= List of International Space Station spacewalks =

Extravehicular activities outside the orbiting lab

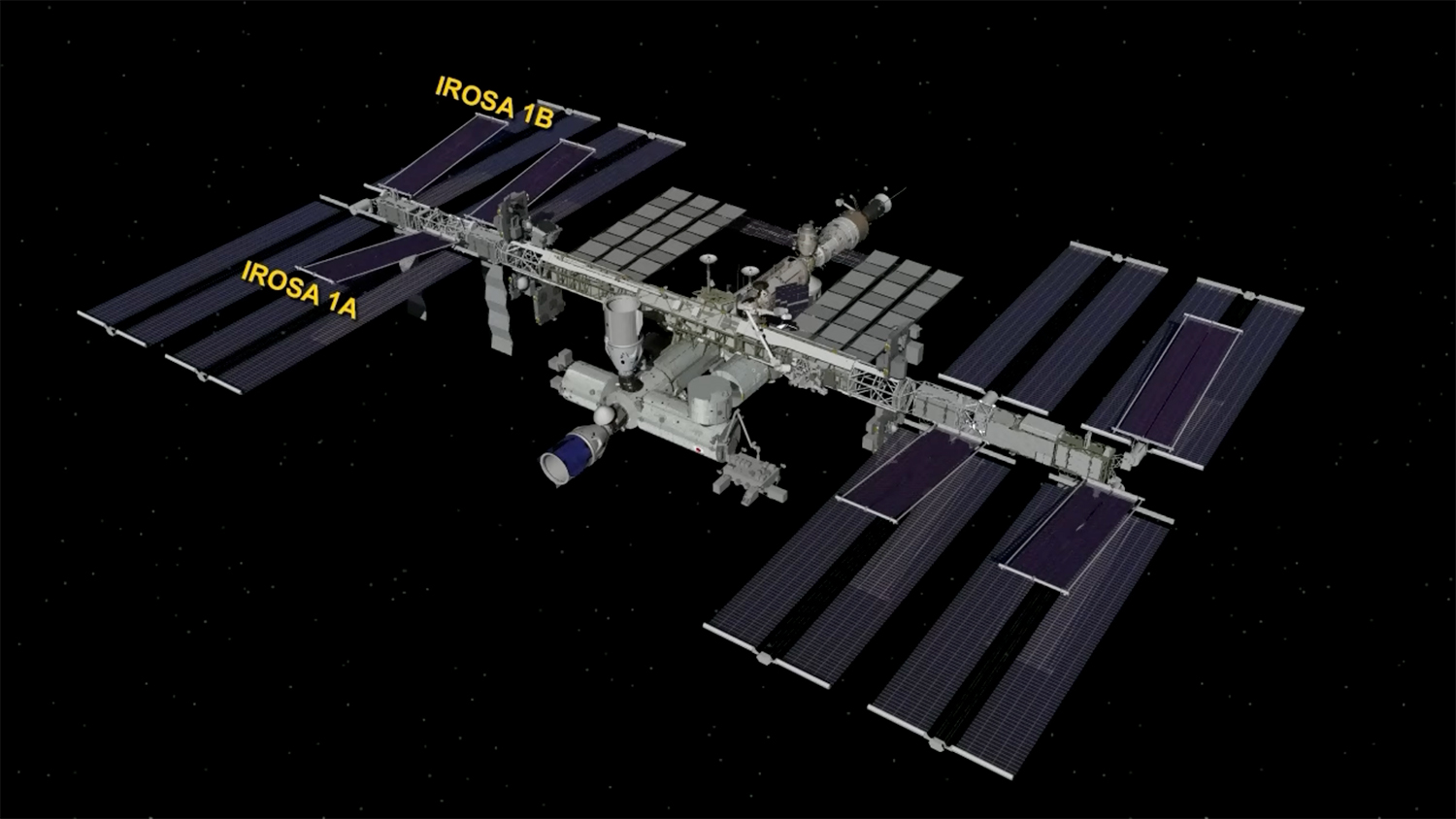
An artist's rendering of the fully assembled International Space Station, as it would appear from a spacecraft flying overhead

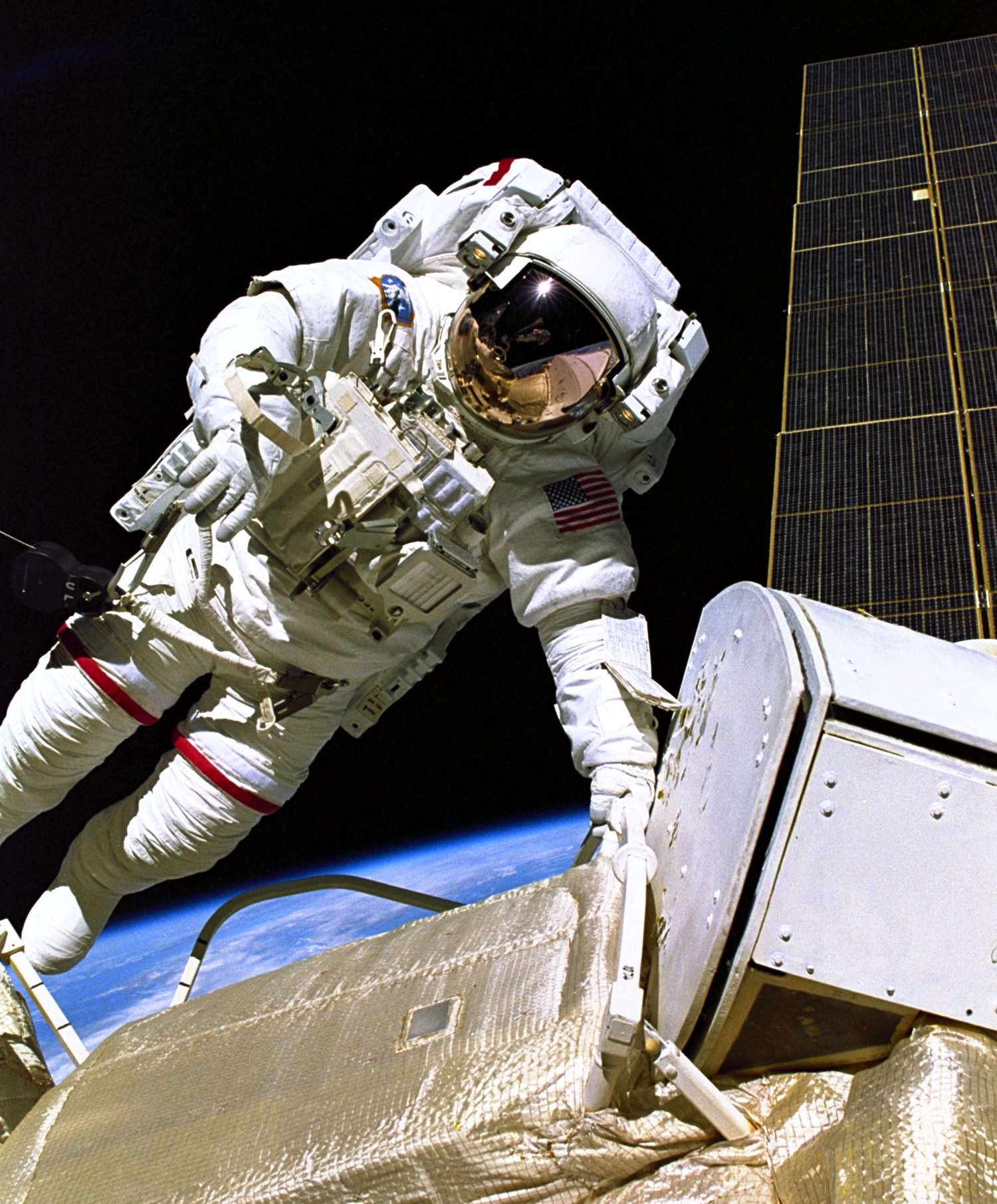
Jerry Ross during one of the first spacewalks that began assembly of the International Space Station

On the International Space Station (ISS), extravehicular activities are major events in the building and maintaining of the orbital laboratory, and are performed to install new components, re-wire systems, modules, and equipment, and to monitor, install, and retrieve scientific experiments.

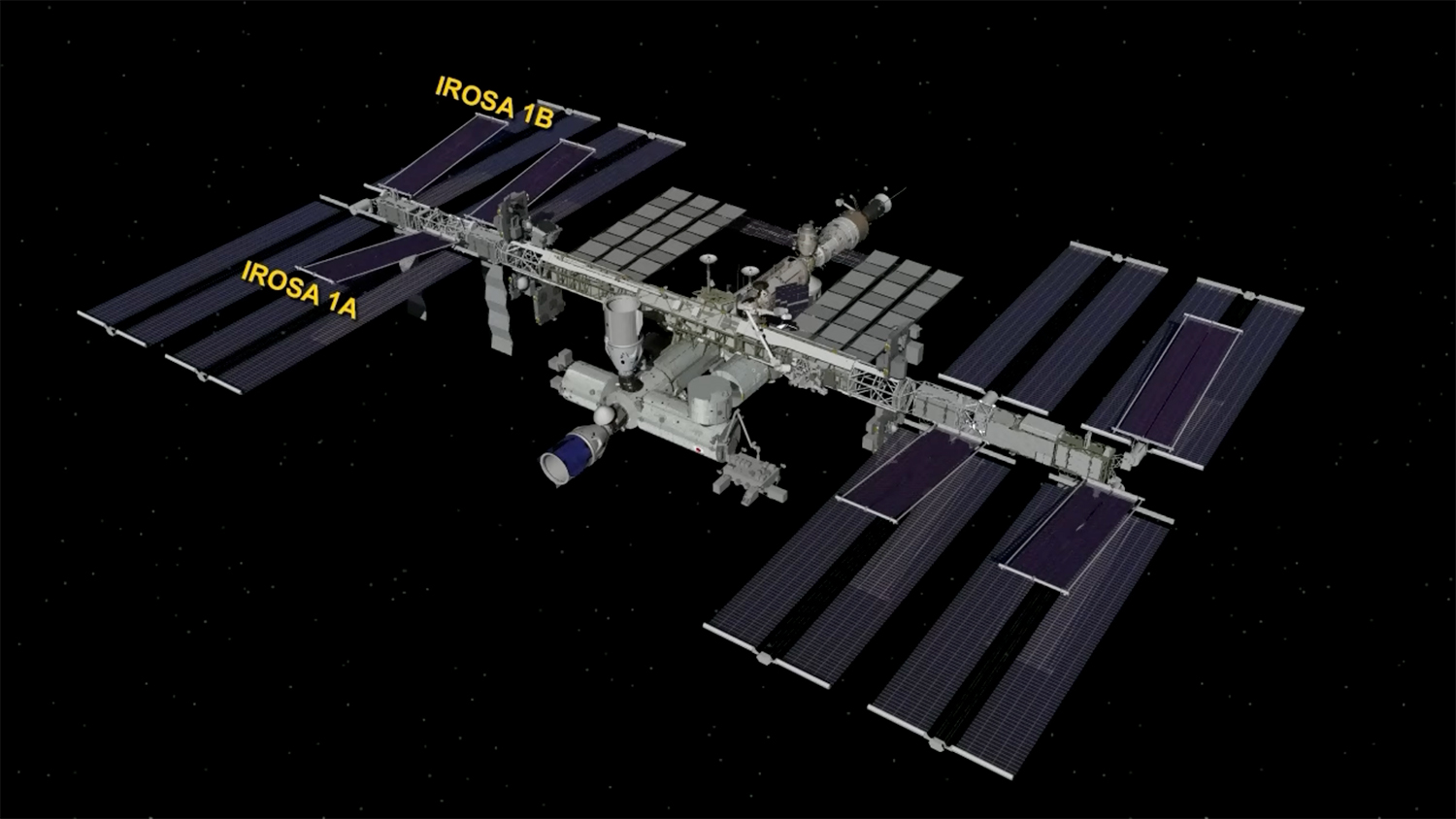
An artist's rendering from 2026 of the fully assembled International Space Station

Due to the complexity of building a station in space, space agencies train astronauts extensively, preparing them to encounter surprises during spacewalks, teaching them how to assemble special tools and equipment, and carefully coordinating every activity during spacewalks. From 1998 to 2005, thirty-seven Space Shuttle missions were scheduled to assemble, outfit and begin experiments and research aboard the station.

The initial spacewalk to begin the assembly of the International Space Station was held on 7 December 1998, following the launch of the first section of the station, Zarya, from Baikonur Cosmodrome, Kazakhstan, on 20 November 1998. The spacewalk attached the U.S.-built Unity node to Zarya. The longest spacewalk was performed on 11 March 2001, when STS-102 crew members Susan J. Helms and James S. Voss conducted a full spacewalk, and then returned to the airlock, but remained in their suits ready to exit the airlock again in case the robotics operations ran into problems. The total time for that spacewalk was eight hours and fifty-six minutes.

As of 2 December 2021, there have been 245 spacewalks devoted to assembly and maintenance of the International Space Station totaling 1548 hours and 26 minutes. Thirty-seven of those spacewalks were performed from a shuttle, ninety-three from the Quest Joint Airlock, thirty-two from the Pirs docking compartment, and two from the transfer compartment at the forward end of the Zvezda service module.

*denotes spacewalks performed from the Pirs docking compartment in Russian Orlan suits.
^denotes spacewalks performed from the Poisk module in Russian Orlan suits.
†denotes spacewalks performed from the visiting Space Shuttle's airlock.
‡denotes the one EVA and one IVA performed from the transfer compartment at the forward end of the Zvezda Service Module.
All other spacewalks were performed from the Quest airlock.
ISS Expedition spacewalks are separated from shuttle spacewalks by a separator.

== 1998–1999 ==
#	Mission	Spacewalkers	Start (UTC)	End (UTC)	Duration
1.	STS-88; EVA 1 †	(United States) Jerry L. Ross (United States) James H. Newman	7 December 1998; 22:10	8 December 1998; 05:31	7 hours, 21 minutes
1.	STS-88; EVA 1 †	Connected computer and electrical cables between the Unity node, the two mating adapters attached to either end of Unity, and the Zarya Functional Cargo Block (FGB).			
2.	STS-88; EVA 2 †	(United States) Jerry L. Ross (United States) James H. Newman	9 December 1998; 20:33	10 December 1998; 03:35	7 hours, 02 minutes
2.	STS-88; EVA 2 †	Installed two box-like antennas on the outside of the Unity module that are part of the S-band early communications system.			
3.	STS-88; EVA 3 †	(United States) Jerry L. Ross (United States) James H. Newman	12 December 1998; 20:33	13 December 1998; 03:32	6 hours, 59 minutes
3.	STS-88; EVA 3 †	Checked on an insulation cover on a cable connection on the lower Pressurized Mating Adapter (PMA 2) to make sure it is fully installed, attached EVA tools on the side of Unity's upper mating adapter (PMA 1) in preparation for future EVAs, and inspected Orbiter Space Vision System targets on Unity.			
4.	STS-96 †	(United States) Tamara E. Jernigan (United States) Daniel T. Barry	30 May 1999; 02:56	30 May 1999; 10:51	7 hours, 55 minutes
4.	STS-96 †	Transferred and installed two cranes from the shuttle's payload bay to locations on the outside of the station. Installed two new portable foot restraints that will fit both American and Russian space boots, and attached three bags filled with tools and handrails that will be used during future assembly operations.			

== 2000 ==
#	Mission	Spacewalkers	Start (UTC)	End (UTC)	Duration
5.	STS-101 †	(United States) James S. Voss (United States) Jeffrey N. Williams	22 May 2000; 01:48	22 May 2000; 08:32	6 hours, 44 minutes
5.	STS-101 †	Inspected and secured U.S.-built cargo crane known as the Orbital Replacement Unit Transfer Device, completed assembly of a Russian cargo crane called Strela, and replaced one of Unity's two early communication antennas.			
6.	STS-106 †	(United States) Edward T. Lu (Russia) Yuri Ivanovich Malenchenko	11 September 2000; 04:47	11 September 2000; 11:01	6 hours, 14 minutes
6.	STS-106 †	Attached cabling that integrated the Zvezda module fully to the rest of the ISS, and constructed and attached a magnetometer that serves as a backup navigation system for the station.			
7.	STS-92; EVA 1 †	(United States) Leroy Chiao (United States) William S. McArthur	15 October 2000; 14:27	15 October 2000; 20:55	6 hours, 28 minutes
7.	STS-92; EVA 1 †	Connected two sets of cables to provide power to heaters and conduits located on the Z1 truss, relocated two communication antenna assemblies, and installed a toolbox for use during future on-orbit construction.			
8.	STS-92; EVA 2 †	(United States) Michael E. Lopez-Alegria (United States) Peter J. K. Wisoff	16 October 2000; 14:15	16 October 2000; 21:22	7 hours, 07 minutes
8.	STS-92; EVA 2 †	Installed the Pressurized Mating Adapter (PMA)-3 docking port, and prepared the Z1 truss for the installation of the solar arrays.			
9.	STS-92; EVA 3 †	(United States) Leroy Chiao (United States) William S. McArthur	17 October 2000; 14:30	17 October 2000; 21:18	6 hours, 48 minutes
9.	STS-92; EVA 3 †	Installed two DC-to-DC converter units atop the station's Z1 Truss.			
10.	STS-92; EVA 4 †	(United States) Michael E. Lopez-Alegria (United States) Peter J. K. Wisoff	18 October 2000; 15:00	18 October 2000; 21:56	6 hours, 56 minutes
10.	STS-92; EVA 4 †	Removed a grapple fixture on the Z1 truss, deployed a Z1 utility tray, Manual Berthing Mechanism latches for Z1 were cycled and opened, and demonstrated the Simplified Aid For EVA Rescue (SAFER) pack's abilities.			
11.	STS-97; EVA 1 †	(United States) Joseph R. Tanner (United States) Carlos I. Noriega	3 December 2000; 18:35	4 December 2000; 02:08	7 hours, 33 minutes
11.	STS-97; EVA 1 †	Attached the P6 truss to the Z1 Truss, and prepared the solar arrays for deployment. Prepared the radiator for the power system deployment.			
12.	STS-97; EVA 2 †	(United States) Joseph R. Tanner (United States) Carlos I. Noriega	5 December 2000; 17:21	5 December 2000; 23:58	6 hours, 37 minutes
12.	STS-97; EVA 2 †	Configured the space station to use power from the P6. Positioned the S-band antenna for use by the space station. Prepared the station for the arrival of the U. S. Laboratory, Destiny.			
13.	STS-97; EVA 3 †	(United States) Joseph R. Tanner (United States) Carlos I. Noriega	7 December 2000; 16:13	7 December 2000; 21:23	5 hours, 10 minutes
13.	STS-97; EVA 3 †	Positioned a floating potential probe to measure the plasma field surrounding the space station, performed repair work to increase tension in the starboard solar array blankets that did not stretch out completely during deployment, and installed a centerline camera cable outside the Unity node.			

== 2001 ==
#	Mission	Spacewalkers	Start (UTC)	End (UTC)	Duration
14.	STS-98; EVA 1 †	(United States) Thomas D. Jones (United States) Robert L. Curbeam	10 February 2001; 15:50	10 February 2001; 23:24	7 hours, 34 minutes
14.	STS-98; EVA 1 †	Removed protective launch covers and disconnected power and cooling cables between Destiny and Atlantis, while crewmembers inside moved the 3,800-cubic-foot (110 m^{3}) laboratory from the payload bay to its home on the Unity node. Curbeam and Jones then connected electrical, data and cooling lines to the lab, during which a small amount of ammonia crystals leaked from one of the hoses, prompting a decontamination procedure.			
15.	STS-98; EVA 2 †	(United States) Thomas D. Jones (United States) Robert L. Curbeam	12 February 2001; 15:59	12 February 2001; 22:49	6 hours, 50 minutes
15.	STS-98; EVA 2 †	Installed the shuttle docking adapter onto Destiny, installed insulating covers over the pins that held Destiny in place during launch, attached a vent to the lab's air system, installed handrails and sockets on the exterior of Destiny, and attached a base for the future space station robotic arm.			
16.	STS-98; EVA 3 †	(United States) Thomas D. Jones (United States) Robert L. Curbeam	14 February 2001; 14:48	14 February 2001; 20:13	5 hours, 25 minutes
16.	STS-98; EVA 3 †	Attached a spare communications antenna to the station, double-checked connections between the Destiny lab and its docking port, released a cooling radiator on the station, inspected solar array connections at the top of the station, and tested the ability of a spacewalker to carry an immobile crew member back to the shuttle airlock. This was the 100th U.S. spacewalk.			
17.	STS-102; EVA 1 †	(United States) James S. Voss (United States) Susan J. Helms	11 March 2001; 05:12	11 March 2001; 14:08	8 hours, 56 minutes
17.	STS-102; EVA 1 †	Prepared Pressurized Mating Adapter-3 for repositioning from Unity’s Earth-facing berth to the port-side berth to make room for Leonardo, the Italian Space Agency-built Multi-Purpose Logistics Module. Removed a Lab Cradle Assembly from the Space Shuttle's cargo bay and installed it on the side of Destiny, and installed a cable tray to Destiny for later use by the station's robot arm. After re-entering the shuttle's airlock, Voss and Helms remained ready to assist if any troubles installing the docking port were encountered by the crew inside the shuttle. Longest space walk in shuttle history.			
18.	STS-102; EVA 2 †	(United States) Andrew S. W. Thomas (United States) Paul W. Richards	13 March 2001; 05:23	13 March 2001; 11:44	6 hours, 21 minutes
18.	STS-102; EVA 2 †	Installed an External Stowage Platform for spare station parts, attached a spare ammonia coolant pump to the platform, finished connecting several cables put in place on the first EVA for the station's robotic arm. Inspected a Unity node heater connection, and inspected of an exterior experiment, the Floating Potential Probe.			
19.	STS-100; EVA 1 †	(Canada) Chris Hadfield (United States) Scott E. Parazynski	22 April 2001; 11:45	22 April 2001; 18:55	7 hours, 10 minutes
19.	STS-100; EVA 1 †	Installed the station's UHF antenna, and the Canadian Space Agency made Canadarm2. Connected cables to give the arm power and allow it to accept computer commands from inside the lab. Hadfield became the first Canadian spacewalker.			
20.	STS-100; EVA 2 †	(Canada) Chris Hadfield (United States) Scott E. Parazynski	24 April 2001; 12:34	24 April 2001; 20:14	7 hours, 40 minutes
20.	STS-100; EVA 2 †	Connected the Power Data Grapple Fixture circuits for Canadarm2 onto Destiny, removed an early communications antenna, transferred a spare Direct Current Switching Unit from the shuttle's payload bay to an equipment storage rack on the outside of Destiny.			
21.	Expedition 2 ‡	(Russia) Yury Usachev (United States) James Voss	8 June 2001; 14:21	8 June 2001; 14:40	0 hours, 19 minutes
21.	Expedition 2 ‡	Installed the docking cone onto the Zvezda Service Module nader hatch, in preparation for the arrival of the Russian Pirs docking compartment. Only EVA to be conducted from the transfer compartment at the forward end of the Zvezda Service Module.			
22.	STS-104; EVA 1 †	(United States) Michael L. Gernhardt (United States) James F. Reilly	15 July 2001; 03:10	15 July 2001; 09:09	5 hours, 59 minutes
22.	STS-104; EVA 1 †	Installed the Quest Joint Airlock onto the Unity node.			
23.	STS-104; EVA 2 †	(United States) Michael L. Gernhardt (United States) James F. Reilly	18 July 2001; 03:04	18 July 2001; 09:33	6 hours, 29 minutes
23.	STS-104; EVA 2 †	Installed one of two high-pressure nitrogen tanks, and two high-pressure oxygen tanks onto Quest, and installed grapple fixture and trunnion covers.			
24.	STS-104; EVA 3	(United States) Michael L. Gernhardt (United States) James F. Reilly	21 July 2001; 04:35	21 July 2001; 08:37	4 hours, 02 minutes
24.	STS-104; EVA 3	First EVA conducted from the Quest airlock. Installed the second high-pressure nitrogen tank onto the Quest airlock.			
25.	STS-105; EVA 1 †	(United States) Daniel T. Barry (United States) Patrick G. Forrester	16 August 2001; 13:58	16 August 2001; 20:14	6 hours, 16 minutes
25.	STS-105; EVA 1 †	Installed an Early Ammonia Servicer onto the station's P6 truss, co-location of the foot restraint in a stowed location, and installed the Materials International Space Station Experiment(MISSE)-1 and 2 containers onto the Quest airlock.			
26.	STS-105; EVA 2 †	(United States) Daniel T. Barry (United States) Patrick G. Forrester	18 August 2001; 13:42	18 August 2001; 19:11	5 hours, 29 minutes
26.	STS-105; EVA 2 †	Installed heater cables and handrails onto the station's Destiny laboratory.			
27.	Expedition 3 EVA 1 *	(Russia) Vladimir Dezhurov (Russia) Mikhail Tyurin	8 October 2001; 14:24	8 October 2001; 19:22	4 hours, 58 minutes
27.	Expedition 3 EVA 1 *	Installed cables between the Pirs, and the Zvezda module to allow spacewalk radio communications between the two sections. Installed handrails onto Pirs, and installed an exterior ladder to assist spacewalkers leaving Pirs. Installed a Strela cargo crane.			
28.	Expedition 3 EVA 2 *	(Russia) Vladimir Dezhurov (Russia) Mikhail Tyurin	15 October 2001; 09:17	15 October 2001; 15:08	5 hours, 51 minutes
28.	Expedition 3 EVA 2 *	Installed Russian commercial experiments (MPAC-SEEDS) onto the exterior of the Pirs docking compartment.			
29.	Expedition 3 EVA 3 *	(Russia) Vladimir Dezhurov (United States) Frank Culbertson	12 November 2001; 21:41	13 November 2001; 02:46	5 hours, 05 minutes
29.	Expedition 3 EVA 3 *	Connected cables on the exterior of Pirs for the Kurs automated docking system, completed checks of the Strela cargo crane, and inspected and photographed a panel of a solar array on Zvezda that had a portion of a panel not fully unfolded.			
30.	Expedition 3 EVA 4 *	(Russia) Vladimir Dezhurov (Russia) Mikhail Tyurin	3 December 2001; 13:20	3 December 2001; 16:06	2 hours, 46 minutes
30.	Expedition 3 EVA 4 *	Removed an obstruction that prevented a Progress resupply ship from firmly docking with the station, and took pictures of the debris and of the docking interface.			
31.	STS-108 †	(United States) Linda M. Godwin (United States) Daniel M. Tani	10 December 2001; 17:52	10 December 2001; 22:04	4 hours, 12 minutes
31.	STS-108 †	Installed insulating blankets around two Beta Gimbal Assemblies that rotate the station's solar array wings, and performed get-ahead tasks in preparation for STS-110's spacewalks.			

== 2002 ==
#	Mission	Spacewalkers	Start (UTC)	End (UTC)	Duration
32.	Expedition 4 EVA 1 *	(Russia) Yury Onufrienko (United States) Carl E. Walz	14 January 2002; 20:59	15 January 2002; 03:02	6 hours, 03 minutes
32.	Expedition 4 EVA 1 *	Moved the cargo boom for the Russian Strela crane from PMA1 to the exterior of the Pirs docking compartment, installed an amateur radio antenna onto the end of Zvezda.			
33.	Expedition 4 EVA 2 *	(Russia) Yury Onufrienko (United States) Daniel W. Bursch	25 January 2002; 15:19	25 January 2002; 21:18	5 hours, 59 minutes
33.	Expedition 4 EVA 2 *	Installed six deflector shields for Zvezda's jet thrusters, installed a second amateur radio antenna, attached four science experiments, and retrieved and replaced a device to measure material from the thrusters.			
34.	Expedition 4 EVA 3	(United States) Carl E. Walz (United States) Daniel W. Bursch	20 February 2002; 11:38	20 February 2002; 17:25	5 hours, 47 minutes
34.	Expedition 4 EVA 3	Tested the Quest airlock, and prepared it for the four spacewalks that will be performed during STS-110. The first spacewalk to be based out of Quest without a Space Shuttle at the station.			
35.	STS-110; EVA 1	(United States) Steven L. Smith (United States) Rex J. Walheim	11 April 2002; 14:36	11 April 2002; 22:24	7 hours, 48 minutes
35.	STS-110; EVA 1	Began installing the S0 Truss onto Destiny, initial power and data connections installed between the station and S0, and installed two forward struts that permanently hold the truss in place.			
36.	STS-110; EVA 2	(United States) Jerry L. Ross (United States) Lee Morin	13 April 2002; 14:09	13 April 2002; 21:39	7 hours, 30 minutes
36.	STS-110; EVA 2	Continued S0 Truss installation, power and data cable connections installed between S0 and the station, and installed two aft struts that permanently hold the truss in place.			
37.	STS-110; EVA 3	(United States) Steven L. Smith (United States) Rex J. Walheim	14 April 2002; 13:48	14 April 2002; 20:15	6 hours, 27 minutes
37.	STS-110; EVA 3	Released the claw that was used in the initial attachment of the S0 Truss, installed connectors that will be used to route power to Canadarm2 when it is on the truss, released launch restraints from the Mobile Transporter, and removed a small thermal cover the Mobile Transporter's radiator.			
38.	STS-110; EVA 4	(United States) Jerry L. Ross (United States) Lee Morin	16 April 2002; 14:29	16 April 2002; 21:06	6 hours, 37 minutes
38.	STS-110; EVA 4	Pivoted the "Airlock Spur", which will be used by spacewalkers in the future as a path from the airlock to the truss, installed handrails onto S0, partially assembled a platform, and installed two floodlights.			
39.	STS-111; EVA 1	(United States) Franklin Chang-Diaz (France) Philippe Perrin	9 June 2002; 15:27	9 June 2002; 22:41	7 hours, 14 minutes
39.	STS-111; EVA 1	Attached a Power Data Grapple Fixture to the P6 truss, removed debris panels from Endeavour's payload bay and attached them to a temporary location on PMA1, and removed thermal blankets to prepare the Mobile Base System (MBS) for installation onto the station's Mobile Transporter.			
40.	STS-111; EVA 2	(United States) Franklin Chang-Diaz (France) Philippe Perrin	11 June 2002; 15:20	11 June 2002; 20:20	5 hours, 00 minutes
40.	STS-111; EVA 2	Attached Mobile Base System to the Mobile Transporter, attached power, data and video cables from the station to the MBS.			
41.	STS-111; EVA 3	(United States) Franklin Chang-Diaz (France) Philippe Perrin	13 June 2002; 15:16	13 June 2002; 22:33	7 hours, 17 minutes
41.	STS-111; EVA 3	Replaced Canadarm2's wrist roll joint, and stowed the old joint in the shuttle's payload bay to be returned to Earth.			
42.	Expedition 5 EVA 1 *	(Russia) Valery Korzun (United States) Peggy Whitson	16 August 2002; 09:25	16 August 2002; 13:48	4 hours, 23 minutes
42.	Expedition 5 EVA 1 *	Installed six micro meteoroid debris panels onto Zvezda.			
43.	Expedition 5 EVA 2 *	(Russia) Valery Korzun (Russia) Sergei Treshchev	26 August 2002; 05:27	26 August 2002; 10:48	5 hours, 21 minutes
43.	Expedition 5 EVA 2 *	Installed a frame on the outside of Zarya for spacewalk assembly tasks, installed new samples on a pair of Japanese Space Agency experiments housed on Zvezda, installed devices on Zvezda that would simplify the routing of tethers during future spacewalks, and installed two additional ham radio antennas on Zvezda.			
44.	STS-112; EVA 1	(United States) David A. Wolf (United States) Piers J. Sellers	10 October 2002; 15:21	10 October 2002; 22:22	7 hours, 01 minute
44.	STS-112; EVA 1	Released launch locks that held the S1 truss radiators in place during launch, attached power, data and fluid lines between the S1 truss and S0, deployed the station's second S-Band communications system, installed the first of two external camera systems, and released launch restraints on the truss' mobile spacewalk workstation, Crew and Equipment Translation Aid (CETA).			
45.	STS-112; EVA 2	(United States) David A. Wolf (United States) Piers J. Sellers	12 October 2002; 14:31	12 October 2002; 20:35	6 hours, 04 minutes
45.	STS-112; EVA 2	Installed a second camera system, released more radiator launch locks, removed insulation covers on quick-disconnect fittings near the Z1 and P6 junction and to install Spool Positioning Devices, released starboard-side launch restraints on the CETA cart, and attached Ammonia Tank Assembly cables.			
46.	STS-112; EVA 3	(United States) David A. Wolf (United States) Piers J. Sellers	14 October 2002; 14:08	14 October 2002; 20:44	6 hours, 36 minutes
46.	STS-112; EVA 3	Removed and replaced the Interface Umbilical Assembly on the station's Mobile Transporter, installed two jumpers that will allow ammonia coolant to flow between the S1 and S0 Trusses, released a drag link and stowed it, and installed Spool Positioning Devices (SPD) on ammonia lines.			
47.	STS-113; EVA 1	(United States) Michael Lopez-Alegria (United States) John Herrington	26 November 2002; 19:49	27 November 2002; 02:34	6 hours, 45 minutes
47.	STS-113; EVA 1	Initial installation of the P1 truss, installed connections between the P1 and the S0 truss, released launch restraints on the CETA cart, installed Spool Positioning Devices (SPDs) onto the station, removed a drag link on P1 that served as a launch restraint, and installed a Wireless video system External Transceiver Assembly onto the Unity node.			
48.	STS-113; EVA 2	(United States) Michael Lopez-Alegria (United States) John Herrington	28 November 2002; 18:36	29 November 2002; 00:46	6 hours, 10 minutes
48.	STS-113; EVA 2	Installed fluid jumpers where the S0 and the P1 are attached to each other, removed the P1's starboard keel pin, installed another wireless video system External Transceiver Assembly onto the P1, and relocated the CETA cart from the P1 to the S1 truss.			
49.	STS-113; EVA 3	(United States) Michael Lopez-Alegria (United States) John Herrington	30 November 2002; 19:25	1 December 2002; 02:25	7 hours, 00 minutes
49.	STS-113; EVA 3	Installed more Spool Positioning Devices, reconfigured electrical harnesses that route power through the Main Bus Switching Units, and attached Ammonia Tank Assembly lines.			

== 2003 ==
#	Mission	Spacewalkers	Start (UTC)	End (UTC)	Duration
50.	Expedition 6 EVA 1	(United States) Kenneth Bowersox (United States) Donald Pettit	15 January 2003; 12:50	15 January 2003; 19:41	6 hours, 51 minutes
50.	Expedition 6 EVA 1	Released the remaining launch locks on the P1 radiator assembly, removed debris on a sealing ring of Unity's docking port, and tested an ammonia reservoir on the station's P6 truss.			
51.	Expedition 6 EVA 2	(United States) Kenneth Bowersox (United States) Donald Pettit	8 April 2003; 12:40	8 April 2003; 19:06	6 hours, 26 minutes
51.	Expedition 6 EVA 2	Reconfigured cables on the S0 (S-Zero), S1 and P1 trusses, replaced a Power Control Module on the Mobile Transporter, installed Spool Positioning Devices on Destiny, and reinstalled a thermal cover on an S1 Radiator Beam Valve Module.			

== 2004 ==
#	Mission	Spacewalkers	Start (UTC)	End (UTC)	Duration
52.	Expedition 8 *	(United States) Michael Foale (Russia) Alexander Kaleri	26 February 2004; 21:17	27 February 2004; 01:12	3 hours, 55 minutes
52.	Expedition 8 *	Replaced cassette containers that held sample materials for a microgravity experiment, attached the Russian experiment Matryoshka to Zvezda, and removed a JAXA micro-meteor impact experiment. Spacewalk was cut short due a cooling system malfunction in Kaleri's spacesuit.			
53.	Expedition 9 EVA 1 *	(Russia) Gennady Padalka (United States) Michael Fincke	24 June 2004; 21:56	24 June 2004; 22:10	0 hours, 14 minutes
53.	Expedition 9 EVA 1 *	Spacewalk cut short due to a pressure problem in Fincke's prime oxygen tank in his spacesuit. Mission managers decided to reschedule the spacewalk for 30 June.			
54.	Expedition 9 EVA 2 *	(Russia) Gennady Padalka (United States) Michael Fincke	30 June 2004; 21:19	1 July 2004; 02:59	5 hours, 40 minutes
54.	Expedition 9 EVA 2 *	Replaced a Remote Power Controller (RPC) that failed in late April, causing a loss of power in Control Moment Gyroscope No. 2 (CMG 2).			
55.	Expedition 9 EVA 3 *	(Russia) Gennady Padalka (United States) Michael Fincke	3 August 2004; 06:58	3 August 2004; 11:28	4 hours, 30 minutes
55.	Expedition 9 EVA 3 *	Removed laser retro reflectors from the Zvezda assembly compartment, and installed three updated laser retro reflectors and one internal videometer target in preparation for the Automated Transfer Vehicle (ATV). Installed two antennas, and removed and replaced Kromka experiment packages.			
56.	Expedition 9 EVA 4 *	(Russia) Gennady Padalka (United States) Michael Fincke	3 September 2004; 16:43	3 September 2004; 22:04	5 hours, 20 minutes
56.	Expedition 9 EVA 4 *	Replaced the Zarya Control Module flow control panel, installed four safety tether fairleads on Zarya's handrails, installed three communications antennas, and removed covers from the antennas.			

== 2005 ==
#	Mission	Spacewalkers	Start (UTC)	End (UTC)	Duration
57.	Expedition 10; EVA 1 *	(United States) Leroy Chiao (Russia) Salizhan Sharipov	26 January 2005; 07:43	26 January 2005; 13:11	5 hours, 28 minutes
57.	Expedition 10; EVA 1 *	Completed the installation of the Universal Work Platform, mounted the European commercial experiment Rokviss (Robotic Components Verification on ISS) and its antenna, installed the Russian Biorisk experiment, and relocated a Japanese exposure experiment.			
58.	Expedition 10; EVA 2 *	(United States) Leroy Chiao (Russia) Salizhan Sharipov	28 March 2005; 06:25	28 March 2005; 10:55	4 hours, 30 minutes
58.	Expedition 10; EVA 2 *	Installed navigational and communications equipment for the arrival of the first Automated Transfer Vehicle (ATV), and deployed an 11-pound Russian Nanosatellite.			
59.	STS-114; EVA 1 †	(Japan) Soichi Noguchi (United States) Stephen K. Robinson	30 July 2005; 09:48	30 July 2005; 17:36	6 hours, 50 minutes
59.	STS-114; EVA 1 †	Demonstrated shuttle thermal protection repair techniques and enhancements to the Station's attitude control system. installed a base and cabling for an External Stowage Platform, rerouted power to Control Moment Gyroscope-2 (CMG-2), retrieved two exposure experiments, and replaced a faulty global positioning system antenna on the station.			
60.	STS-114; EVA 2 †	(Japan) Soichi Noguchi (United States) Stephen K. Robinson	1 August 2005; 08:42	1 August 2005; 15:56	7 hours, 14 minutes
60.	STS-114; EVA 2 †	Removed faulty CMG-1 from the Z1 truss, installed faulty CMG-1 into Discovery's payload bay, and installed new CMG-1 onto the Z1 truss segment.			
61.	STS-114; EVA 3 †	(Japan) Soichi Noguchi (United States) Stephen K. Robinson	3 August 2005; 08:48	3 August 2005; 14:49	6 hours, 01 minute
61.	STS-114; EVA 3 †	Photographed and inspected Discovery’s heat shield, removed two protruding gap fillers from between tiles in the forward area of the orbiter's underside, and installed amateur radio satellite PCSAT2.			
62.	Expedition 11; EVA 1 *	(Russia) Sergei Krikalev (United States) John L. Phillips	18 August 2005; 19:02	19 August 2005; 00:00	4 hours, 58 minutes
62.	Expedition 11; EVA 1 *	Retrieved one of three canisters from the Biorisk experiment, removed Micro-Particles Capturer experiment and Space Environment Exposure Device from Zvezda, retrieved Matroska experiment, installed an Automated Transfer Vehicle (ATV) docking television camera.			
63.	Expedition 12; EVA 1	(United States) William S. McArthur (Russia) Valery Tokarev	7 November 2005; 15:32	7 November 2005; 20:54	5 hours, 22 minutes
63.	Expedition 12; EVA 1	Installed and set up the P1 Truss camera, retrieved a failed Rotary Joint Motor Controller (RJMC), jettisoned a Floating Potential Probe, and removed and replaced a remote power controller module on the Mobile Transporter. First Quest airlock-based spacewalk since April 2003.			

== 2006 ==
#	Mission	Spacewalkers	Start (UTC)	End (UTC)	Duration
64.	Expedition 12; EVA 2 *	(United States) William S. McArthur (Russia) Valery Tokarev	3 February 2006; 9:55	3 February 2006; 16:27	5 hours, 43 minutes
64.	Expedition 12; EVA 2 *	Released SuitSat-1, retrieved the Biorisk experiment, photographed a sensor for a micrometeoroid experiment, relocated an adapter for a small crane, and tied off the surviving umbilical of the Mobile Transporter.			
65.	Expedition 13; EVA 1 *	(Russia) Pavel Vinogradov (United States) Jeffrey Williams	1 June 2006; 23:48	2 June 2006; 06:19	6 hours, 31 minutes
65.	Expedition 13; EVA 1 *	Repaired a vent for the station's oxygen-producing Elektron unit, retrieved a Biorisk experiment, retrieved a contamination-monitoring device from Zvezda, and replaced a malfunctioning camera on the Mobile Base System.			
66.	STS-121; EVA 1	(United States) Piers Sellers (United States) Michael E. Fossum	8 July 2006; 13:17	8 July 2006; 20:48	7 hours, 31 minutes
66.	STS-121; EVA 1	Installed a blade blocker in the zenith Interface Umbilical Assembly (IUA) to protect the undamaged power, data and video cable, rerouted the cable to prepare for the second EVA. Tested the combination of the Space Shuttle Canadarm(SRMS) and the Orbiter Boom Sensor System (OBSS) as a platform for astronauts to make repairs to a damaged orbiter.			
67.	STS-121; EVA 2	(United States) Piers Sellers (United States) Michael E. Fossum	10 July 2006; 12:14	10 July 2006; 19:01	6 hours, 47 minutes
67.	STS-121; EVA 2	Restored the International Space Station's Mobile Transporter rail car to full operation, and delivered a spare pump module for the station's cooling system. Sellers' SAFER pack came loose during the EVA, requiring Fossum to stop twice during the spacewalk to secure the pack with safety tethers.			
68.	STS-121; EVA 3	(United States) Piers Sellers (United States) Michael E. Fossum	12 July 2006; 7:11	12 July 2006; 13:31	7 hours, 11 minutes
68.	STS-121; EVA 3	Used an infrared camera to shoot 20 seconds of video of selected reinforced carbon-carbon (RCC) panels on the shuttle wing's leading edge, and then moved to the payload bay to test a shuttle tile repair material known as NOAX on pre-damaged shuttle tiles that were flown in a test container.			
69.	Expedition 13; EVA 2	(United States) Jeffrey Williams (Germany) Thomas Reiter	3 August 2006; 14:04	3 August 2006; 19:58	5 hours, 54 minutes
69.	Expedition 13; EVA 2	Installed: The Floating Potential Measurement Unit (FPMU), two materials on Materials International Space Station Experiment (MISSE) containers, a controller for a thermal radiator rotary joint on the S1 truss, a starboard jumper and spool positioning device (SPD) on S1, a light on the truss railway handcart, and installed and replaced a malfunctioning GPS antenna. Tested an infrared camera designed to detect damage in a shuttle's reinforced carbon-carbon (RCC) thermal protection tiles. Inspection and photography of a scratch on the Quest airlock hatch.			
70.	STS-115; EVA 1	(United States) Joe Tanner (United States) Heidemarie Stefanyshyn-Piper	12 September 2006; 10:17	12 September 2006; 15:43	6 hours, 26 minutes
70.	STS-115; EVA 1	Initial installation of the P3/P4 truss onto the space station. Connected power cables on the truss, released the launch restraints on the solar array blanket box, the Beta Gimbal Assembly, and the solar array wings. Configured the Solar Alpha Rotary Joint (SARJ), and removed two circuit interrupt devices to prepare for STS-116. Piper became the seventh American woman to conduct a spacewalk.			
71.	STS-115; EVA 2	(United States) Dan Burbank (Canada) Steve MacLean	13 September 2006; 9:05	13 September 2006; 16:16	7 hours, 11 minutes
71.	STS-115; EVA 2	Continued installation of the P3/4 truss onto the station, and activated the SARJ.			
72.	STS-115; EVA 3	(United States) Joe Tanner (United States) Heidemarie Stefanyshyn-Piper	15 September 2006; 10:00	15 September 2006; 16:42	6 hours, 42 minutes
72.	STS-115; EVA 3	Installed a radiator onto the P3/4 truss, powered up a cooling radiator for the new solar arrays, replaced an S-Band radio antenna, and installed insulation for another antenna. Tanner took photos of the shuttle's wings using an infrared camera to test the camera's ability to detect damage.			
73.	Expedition 14; EVA 1 *	(Russia) Mikhail Tyurin (United States) Michael Lopez-Alegria	22 November 2006; 23:17	23 November 2006; 04:55	5 hours, 38 minutes
73.	Expedition 14; EVA 1 *	"Orbiting golf shot" event sponsored by a Canadian golf company through the Russian Federal Space Agency. Lopez-Alegria put the tee on the ladder outside Pirs, while Tyurin set up a camera, and then performed the golf shot. Inspected and photographed a Kurs antenna on Progress 23, relocated an Automated Transfer Vehicle (ATV) WAL antenna, installed a BTN neutron experiment, and jettisoned two thermal covers from the BTN.			
74.	STS-116; EVA 1	(United States) Robert Curbeam (Sweden) Christer Fuglesang	12 December 2006; 20:31	13 December 2006; 03:07	6 hours, 36 minutes
74.	STS-116; EVA 1	Installed the ISS P5 Truss, and replaced a video camera on the S1 truss.			
75.	STS-116; EVA 2	(United States) Robert Curbeam (Sweden) Christer Fuglesang	14 December 2006; 19:41	15 December 2006; 00:41	5 hours, 00 minutes
75.	STS-116; EVA 2	Reconfigured the station's electrical wiring, channels 2–3 on the P3/P4 truss to take advantage of the new solar arrays, relocated two handcarts that run along rails on the station's main truss, put a thermal cover on the station's robotic arm, and installed bags of tools for future spacewalkers.			
76.	STS-116; EVA 3	(United States) Robert Curbeam (United States) Sunita Williams	16 December 2006; 19:25	17 December 2006; 02:57	7 hours, 31 minutes
76.	STS-116; EVA 3	Completed rewiring the station's electrical system, circuits 1 and 4, to take advantage of the P3/P4 solar array power, installed a robotic arm grapple fixture, and positioned three bundles of Russian debris shield panels outside Zvezda. Additional time was spent trying to help retract the P6 solar array panel by shaking the panel's blanket box from its base. (Williams became the 8th American woman to perform an EVA, and the 9th woman spacewalker.)			
77.	STS-116; EVA 4	(United States) Robert Curbeam (Sweden) Christer Fuglesang	18 December 2006; 19:00	19 December 2006; 01:38	6 hours, 38 minutes
77.	STS-116; EVA 4	Assisted ground controllers with retracting the P6 solar array panels. Curbeam, on his seventh spacewalk, set a single-flight EVA record with four spacewalks in a single shuttle mission.			

== 2007 ==
#	Mission	Spacewalkers	Start (UTC)	End (UTC)	Duration
78.	Expedition 14; EVA 2	(United States) Michael Lopez-Alegria (United States) Sunita Williams	31 January 2007; 15:14	31 January 2007; 23:09	7 hours, 55 minutes
78.	Expedition 14; EVA 2	Reconfigured one of the two cooling loops serving Destiny from the temporary to permanent system, connected a cable for the Station-to-Shuttle Power Transfer System (SSPTS), installed six cable cinches and two winch bars to secure the starboard radiator of the P6 Truss, and then installed a shroud over it. Removed one of two fluid lines from the Early Ammonia Servicer (EAS) on the P6 Truss. The EAS would be jettisoned during a later EVA.			
79.	Expedition 14; EVA 3	(United States) Michael Lopez-Alegria (United States) Sunita Williams	4 February 2007; 13:38	4 February 2007; 20:49	7 hours, 11 minutes
79.	Expedition 14; EVA 3	Reconfigured the second of the two cooling loops serving Destiny from the temporary to permanent system, completed work with the Early Ammonia Servicer (EAS) on the P6 Truss, photographed the inboard end of the P6 starboard solar wing in preparation for its retraction during STS-117, removed a sunshade from a multiplexer-demultiplexer data relay device, and continued work on the SSPTS.			
80.	Expedition 14; EVA 4	(United States) Michael Lopez-Alegria (United States) Sunita Williams	8 February 2007; 13:26	8 February 2007; 20:06	6 hours, 40 minutes
80.	Expedition 14; EVA 4	Removed two thermal shrouds on two Rotary Joint Motor Controllers (RJMC) on the P3 truss, removed two large shrouds from P3 Bays 18 and 20, and jettisoned the shrouds away from the station. Deployed an Unpressurized Cargo Carrier Assembly Attachment System (UCCAS) on the upper face of the P3 truss, removed two launch locks from the P5 truss, and connected four cables of the SSPTS to the Pressurized Mating Adapter (PMA-2) at the forward end of Destiny where shuttles dock.			
81.	Expedition 14; EVA 5 *	(Russia) Mikhail Tyurin (United States) Michael Lopez-Alegria	22 February 2007; 10:27	22 February 2007; 16:45	6 hours, 18 minutes
81.	Expedition 14; EVA 5 *	Retracted the antenna of the Progress cargo carrier at the aft port of the Zvezda service module, photographed a Russian satellite navigation antenna, and replaced a Russian materials experiment, inspected and photographed an antenna for the Automated Transfer Vehicle (ATV), photographed a German robotics experiment, and inspected, remated, and photographed hardware connectors.			
82.	Expedition 15; EVA 1 *	(Russia) Fyodor Yurchikhin (Russia) Oleg Kotov	30 May 2007; 19:05	31 May 2007; 00:30	5 hours, 25 minutes
82.	Expedition 15; EVA 1 *	Installed Service Module Debris Protection (SMDP) panels and rerouted a Global Positioning System antenna cable.			
83.	Expedition 15; EVA 2 *	(Russia) Fyodor Yurchikhin (Russia) Oleg Kotov	6 June 2007; 14:23	6 June 2007; 20:00	5 hours, 37 minutes
83.	Expedition 15; EVA 2 *	Installed a section of Ethernet cable on the Zarya module, installed additional Service Module Debris Protection (SMDP) panels on Zvezda, and deployed a Russian scientific experiment.			
84.	STS-117; EVA 1	(United States) James F. Reilly (United States) John D. Olivas	11 June 2007; 20:02	12 June 2007; 02:17	6 hours, 15 minutes
84.	STS-117; EVA 1	Began the S3/S4 Truss installation.			
85.	STS-117; EVA 2	(United States) Patrick G. Forrester (United States) Steven Swanson	13 June 2007; 18:28	14 June 2007; 01:44	7 hours, 16 minutes
85.	STS-117; EVA 2	Assisted in retraction of the solar panels on the P6 Truss. Completed the S3/S4 truss installation. Partial failure due to the S3/S4 SARJ motor control circuits being wired in reverse, so some launch restraints were left in place to prevent the possibility of undesired rotation.			
86.	STS-117; EVA 3	(United States) James F. Reilly (United States) John D. Olivas	15 June 2007; 17:24	16 June 2007; 01:22	7 hours, 58 minutes
86.	STS-117; EVA 3	Repaired the Orbital Maneuvering System (OMS) pod thermal blanket, finished the P6 solar array retraction, and installed a hydrogen ventilation valve onto Destiny.			
87.	STS-117; EVA 4	(United States) Patrick G. Forrester (United States) Steven Swanson	17 June 2007; 16:25	17 June 2007; 22:54	6 hours, 29 minutes
87.	STS-117; EVA 4	Retrieved a television camera and its support structure from an External Stowage Platform attached to the Quest airlock, and installed it on the S3 truss, verified the Drive Lock Assembly (DLA) 2 configuration, and removed the last six SARJ launch restraints. Installed a computer network cable on the Unity node, opened the hydrogen vent valve on the Destiny laboratory, and tethered two orbital debris shield panels on the station's service module.			
88.	Expedition 15; EVA 3	(United States) Clayton Anderson (Russia) Fyodor Yurchikhin	23 July 2007; 10:25	23 July 2007; 18:06	7 hours, 41 minutes
88.	Expedition 15; EVA 3	Replaced components for the Mobile Transporter's redundant power system, jettisoned an ammonia tank and flight support equipment, and cleaned the Common Berthing Mechanism (CBM) on the nadir port of Unity.			
89.	STS-118; EVA 1	(United States) Richard Mastracchio (Canada) Dafydd Williams	11 August 2007; 16:28	11 August 2007; 23:45	6 hours, 17 minutes
89.	STS-118; EVA 1	Attached the Starboard 5 (S5) segment of the station's truss, and retracted the forward heat-rejecting radiator from the station's Port 6 (P6) truss.			
90.	STS-118; EVA 2	(United States) Richard Mastracchio (Canada) Dafydd Williams	13 August 2007; 15:32	13 August 2007; 22:00	6 hours, 28 minutes
90.	STS-118; EVA 2	Removed the new Control Moment Gyroscope (CMG) from the shuttle's payload bay and installed it onto the Z1 truss. Installed the failed CMG onto an External Stowage Platform (ESP-2).			
91.	STS-118; EVA 3	(United States) Richard Mastracchio (United States) Clay Anderson	15 August 2007; 14:38	15 August 2007; 20:05	5 hours, 28 minutes
91.	STS-118; EVA 3	Moved two Crew Equipment Translation Aid (CETA) carts from tracks on the left side of the Canadarm2 Mobile Transporter to its right side. Relocated an antenna base from the P6 truss to P1, and installed a new transponder and signal processor for an S-band communications upgrade. During the EVA, Mastracchio noted a hole in the second layer of material on the thumb of his left glove. The suit has five protective layers, and the small hole did not cause any danger to Mastracchio, but he returned to the airlock early as a precautionary measure.			
92.	STS-118; EVA 4	(Canada) Dafydd Williams (United States) Clay Anderson	18 August 2007; 14:17	18 August 2007; 19:02	5 hours, 02 minutes
92.	STS-118; EVA 4	Retrieved Materials International Space Station Experiment (MISSE) containers 3 and 4, installed the Orbiter Boom Sensor System (OBSS) Boom Stand, installed an External Wireless Instrumentation System (EWIS) antenna, and secured Z1 gimbal locks.			
93.	STS-120; EVA 1	(United States) Scott E. Parazynski (United States) Douglas H. Wheelock	26 October 2007; 10:02	26 October 2007; 16:16	6 hours, 14 minutes
93.	STS-120; EVA 1	Installed the new Harmony module in its temporary location, retrieved the S-Band Antenna Support Assembly, and prepared for the relocation of the P6 truss by disconnecting fluid lines on the P6/Z1 truss segments.			
94.	STS-120; EVA 2	(United States) Scott E. Parazynski (United States) Daniel M. Tani	28 October 2007; 09:32	28 October 2007; 16:05	6 hours, 33 minutes
94.	STS-120; EVA 2	Disconnected the Z1-to-P6 umbilicals, detached P6 from Z1, configured the S1 radiator, installed handrails onto Harmony, and inspected the S4 starboard Solar Alpha Rotary Joint (SARJ).			
95.	STS-120; EVA 3	(United States) Scott E. Parazynski (United States) Douglas H. Wheelock	30 October 2007; 08:45	30 October 2007; 15:53	7 hours, 08 minutes
95.	STS-120; EVA 3	Attached P6 to P5, installed P6/P5 umbilical connections, reconfigured S1 following its redeployment, and inspected the port SARJ.			
96.	STS-120; EVA 4	(United States) Scott E. Parazynski (United States) Douglas H. Wheelock	3 November 2007; 10:03	3 November 2007; 17:22	7 hours, 19 minutes
96.	STS-120; EVA 4	Inspection and repair of the P6 solar array.			
97.	Expedition 16; EVA 1	(United States) Peggy Whitson (Russia) Yuri Malenchenko	9 November 2007; 09:54	9 November 2007; 16:49	6 hours, 55 minutes
97.	Expedition 16; EVA 1	Disconnected and stored the Station-to-Shuttle Power Transfer System cables, stored the PMA-2 umbilical, and stowed a Harmony node avionics umbilical into a temporary position.			
98.	Expedition 16; EVA 2	(United States) Peggy Whitson (United States) Daniel M. Tani	20 November 2007; 10:10	20 November 2007; 17:26	7 hours, 16 minutes
98.	Expedition 16; EVA 2	External configuration of PMA-2 and Harmony: Fluid, electrical, and data lines attached, avionics lines hooked up, heater cables attached, and relocated a fluid tray.			
99.	Expedition 16; EVA 3	(United States) Peggy Whitson (United States) Daniel M. Tani	24 November 2007; 09:50	24 November 2007; 16:54	7 hours, 04 minutes
99.	Expedition 16; EVA 3	Completion of fluid, electrical, and data line hookups for PMA-2 and Harmony. Loop B Fluid Tray connected to the port side of the Destiny laboratory. Inspected and photographed the starboard Solar Alpha Rotary Joint (SARJ) to assist with troubleshooting on the ground.			
100.	Expedition 16; EVA 4	(United States) Peggy Whitson (United States) Daniel M. Tani	18 December 2007; 09:50	18 December 2007; 16:46	6 hours, 56 minutes
100.	Expedition 16; EVA 4	Inspected the S4 starboard Solar Alpha Rotary Joint (SARJ), and a Beta Gimbal Assembly (BGA). Records: 100th EVA in support of assembly and maintenance of the International Space Station. Whitson became the female astronaut with the most EVAs (five) and the most time spent in EVA, with a total of 32 hours, 36 minutes.			

== 2008 ==
#	Mission	Spacewalkers	Start (UTC)	End (UTC)	Duration
101.	Expedition 16; EVA 5	(United States) Peggy Whitson (United States) Daniel M. Tani	30 January 2008; 09:56	30 January 2008; 17:06	7 hours, 10 minutes
101.	Expedition 16; EVA 5	Replaced the Bearing Motor Roll Ring Module on one of the station's solar wings, and inspected and photographed the starboard Solar Alpha Rotary Joint (SARJ).			
102.	STS-122; EVA 1	(United States) Rex J. Walheim (United States) Stanley G. Love	11 February 2008; 14:13	11 February 2008; 22:11	7 hours, 58 minutes
102.	STS-122; EVA 1	Installed a grapple fixture on Columbus while it was still in the shuttle's payload bay, prepared electrical and data connections on Columbus, and replaced a large nitrogen tank used for pressurizing the station's ammonia cooling system.			
103.	STS-122; EVA 2	(United States) Rex J. Walheim (Germany) Hans Schlegel	13 February 2008; 14:27	13 February 2008; 21:12	6 hours, 45 minutes
103.	STS-122; EVA 2	Installed the P1 Truss Nitrogen (N2) tank assembly, stowed the old N2 tank assembly into the shuttle's payload bay, and completed routing for the Station-to-Shuttle Power Transfer System (SSPTS).			
104.	STS-122; EVA 3	(United States) Rex J. Walheim (United States) Stanley G. Love	15 February 2008; 14:27	15 February 2008; 20:32	7 hours, 25 minutes
104.	STS-122; EVA 3	Installed the Solar Monitoring Observatory (SOLAR) telescope and the European Technology Exposure Facility (EuTEF) facility onto an External Stowage Platform (ESP) on Columbus. Retrieved a failed Control Moment Gyroscope (CMG), installed the failed CMG into the shuttle's payload bay, and installed keel pin cloth covers on Columbus.			
105.	STS-123; EVA 1	(United States) Richard M. Linnehan (United States) Garrett Reisman	14 March 2008; 01:18	14 March 2008; 08:19	7 hours, 01 minute
105.	STS-123; EVA 1	Installed the Japanese Experiment Logistics Module, Pressurized Section (ELM-PS) onto its temporary location on top of Harmony, and began assembly of the Special Purpose Dexterous Manipulator (Dextre) .			
106.	STS-123; EVA 2	(United States) Richard M. Linnehan (United States) Michael Foreman	15 March 2008; 23:49	16 March 2008; 06:57	7 hours, 08 minutes
106.	STS-123; EVA 2	Dextre assembly continued, two "arms" attached to Dextre.			
107.	STS-123; EVA 3	(United States) Richard M. Linnehan (United States) Robert L. Behnken	17 March 2008; 22:51	18 March 2008; 05:44	6 hours, 53 minutes
107.	STS-123; EVA 3	Dextre assembly completed. Spare equipment for the station installed onto an external stowage platform (ESP) on the Quest airlock, including a yaw joint for the station's robotic arm, Canadarm2, and two spare direct current switching units.			
108.	STS-123; EVA 4	(United States) Michael Foreman (United States) Robert L. Behnken	20 March 2008; 22:04	21 March 2008; 04:28	6 hours, 24 minutes
108.	STS-123; EVA 4	Replaced a Remote Power Control (RPC) module, and tested shuttle thermal tile repair materials and techniques. Removed a cover from the left arm of Dextre, and removed launch locks from the Harmony module. Released launch locks on Harmony's port and nadir Common Berthing Mechanisms (CBM).			
109.	STS-123; EVA 5	(United States) Michael Foreman (United States) Robert L. Behnken	22 March 2008; 20:34	23 March 2008; 02:36	6 hours, 02 minutes
109.	STS-123; EVA 5	Stored the shuttle Orbiter Boom Sensor System (OBSS) onto the station, installed a materials experiment on the outside of the Columbus laboratory, and inspected the Solar Alpha Rotary Joint (SARJ).			
110.	STS-124; EVA 1	(United States) Michael E. Fossum (United States) Ronald J. Garan	3 June 2008; 16:24	3 June 2008; 23:12	6 hours, 48 minutes
110.	STS-124; EVA 1	Released straps on the shuttle's robotic arm elbow joint camera, transferred the OBSS back to the shuttle. Prepared the Japanese Experiment Module, Pressurized Module (JEM-PM), named Kibo, for installation. Replaced a trundle bearing assembly on the starboard Solar Alpha Rotary Joint, and inspected damage on the SARJ.			
111.	STS-124; EVA 2	(United States) Michael E. Fossum (United States) Ronald J. Garan	5 June 2008; 15:04	5 June 2008; 22:15	7 hours, 11 minutes
111.	STS-124; EVA 2	Installed covers and external equipment to Kibo, prepared for the relocation of the Japanese Experiment Logistics Module, Pressurized Section (ELM-PS). Prepared a nitrogen tank assembly for removal, and the new tank was stowed on an External Stowage Platform to prepare for installation. Removed a television camera with failed power supply.			
112.	STS-124; EVA 3	(United States) Michael E. Fossum (United States) Ronald J. Garan	8 June 2008; 13:55	8 June 2008; 20:28	6 hours, 33 minutes
112.	STS-124; EVA 3	Removed and replaced the starboard nitrogen tank assembly. Finished outfitting the Kibo laboratory. Reinstalled a television camera with a repaired power supply.			
113.	Expedition 17; EVA 1 *	(Russia) Sergei Volkov (Russia) Oleg Kononenko	10 July 2008; 18:48	11 July 2008; 1:06	6 hours, 18 minutes
113.	Expedition 17; EVA 1 *	Inspected the Soyuz TMA-12 spacecraft, removed a pyrotechnic bolt from the Soyuz, installed a docking target for the new Russian MRM (Multipurpose Research Module) on the Service Module Transfer Compartment.			
114.	Expedition 17; EVA 2 *	(Russia) Sergei Volkov (Russia) Oleg Kononenko	15 July 2008; 17:08	15 July 2008; 23:02	5 hours, 54 minutes
114.	Expedition 17; EVA 2 *	Installed a docking target on the Zvezda service module. Installed the Vsplesk experiment, straightened the ham radio antenna, and retrieved the Biorisk experiment.			
115.	STS-126; EVA 1	(United States) Heidemarie Stefanyshyn-Piper (United States) Stephen G. Bowen	18 November 2008; 18:09	19 November 2008; 01:01	6 hours, 52 minutes
115.	STS-126; EVA 1	Transferred an empty nitrogen tank assembly from ESP3 to the shuttle's cargo bay, transferred a new flex hose rotary coupler to ESP3 for future use, removed an insulation cover on the Kibo External Facility berthing mechanism, began cleaning and lubrication of the starboard SARJ, and replacement of its 12 trundle bearing assemblies. This spacewalk is famous for the lost toolbox incident. During the spacewalk Piper did not secure her tools or cap the grease gun she was using and they floated off into space. The tools did not contact the station and they used spare tools that were stowed in Bowen's tool bag.			
116.	STS-126; EVA 2	(United States) Heidemarie Stefanyshyn-Piper (United States) Robert S. Kimbrough	20 November 2008; 17:58	21 November 2008; 00:43	6 hours, 45 minutes
116.	STS-126; EVA 2	Relocated the two Crew and Equipment Translation Aid (CETA) carts from the starboard side of the Mobile Transporter to the port side, lubricated the station robotic arm's latching end effector A snare bearings, continued cleaning and lubrication of the starboard SARJ. EVA was conducted on the station's tenth anniversary.			
117.	STS-126; EVA 3	(United States) Heidemarie Stefanyshyn-Piper (United States) Stephen G. Bowen	22 November 2008; 18:01	23 November 2008; 00:58	6 hours, 57 minutes
117.	STS-126; EVA 3	Completed cleaning and lubrication of all but one of the trundle bearing assemblies (TBA) on the starboard SARJ. The final TBA will be replaced during EVA 4.			
118.	STS-126; EVA 4	(United States) Stephen G. Bowen (United States) Robert S. Kimbrough	24 November 2008; 18:24	25 November 2008; 00:31	6 hours, 07 minutes
118.	STS-126; EVA 4	Completed replacement of trundle bearing assemblies on starboard SARJ, lubricated the port SARJ, installed a video camera, re‐installed insulation covers on the Kibo External Facility berthing mechanism, performed Kibo robotic arm grounding tab maintenance, installed spacewalk handrails on Kibo, installed Global Positioning Satellite (GPS) antennae on Kibo, photographed radiators, and photographed trailing umbilical system cables.			
119.	Expedition 18; EVA 1 *	(Russia) Yuri Lonchakov (United States) Michael Fincke	23 December 2008; 00:51	23 December 2008; 06:29	5 hours, 38 minutes
119.	Expedition 18; EVA 1 *	Installed the electromagnetic energy measuring device, (Langmuir probe) on Pirs, removed the Russian Biorisk long-duration experiment, installed the Expose-R experiment package on Zvezda, but subsequently removed it after it failed to activate and transmit telemetry on ground command. Installed the Impulse experiment, and photographed external ISS structures as part of the "Panorama-2008" detailed test objective (DTO).			

== 2009 ==
#	Mission	Spacewalkers	Start (UTC)	End (UTC)	Duration
120.	Expedition 18; EVA 2 *	(Russia) Yuri Lonchakov (United States) Michael Fincke	10 March 2009; 16:22	10 March 2009; 21:11	4 hours, 49 minutes
120.	Expedition 18; EVA 2 *	Installed the EXPOSE-R onto the universal science platform of the Zvezda module, removed tape straps from the area of the docking target on the Pirs airlock and docking compartment, inspected and photographed the exterior of the Russian portion of the station.			
121.	STS-119; EVA 1	(United States) Steven R. Swanson (United States) Richard R. Arnold	19 March 2009; 17:16	19 March 2009; 23:23	6 hours, 07 minutes
121.	STS-119; EVA 1	Installed the Starboard 6 (S6) truss to the S5 truss, connected S5/S6 umbilicals, released launch restraints, removed keel pins, stored and removed thermal covers, and deployed the S6 photovoltaic radiator.			
122.	STS-119; EVA 2	(United States) Steven R. Swanson (United States) Joseph M. Acaba	21 March 2009; 16:51	21 March 2009; 23:21	6 hours, 30 minutes
122.	STS-119; EVA 2	Advanced preparation of a worksite for STS-127, partially installed an unpressurized cargo carrier attachment system on the P3 truss, installed a Global Positioning System antenna to the Kibo laboratory, and obtained infrared imagery of panels of the radiators on the P1 and S1 trusses.			
123.	STS-119; EVA 3	(United States) Joseph M. Acaba (United States) Richard R. Arnold	23 March 2009; 15:37	23 March 2009; 22:04	6 hours, 27 minutes
123.	STS-119; EVA 3	Relocated a crew equipment cart, completed the deployment of a cargo carrier, and finished swapping electrical relays to the station's gyroscopes.			
124.	Expedition 20; EVA 1 *	(Russia) Gennady Padalka (United States) Michael R. Barratt	5 June 2009; 7:52	5 June 2009; 12:46	4 hours, 54 minutes
124.	Expedition 20; EVA 1 *	Prepared the Zvezda service module transfer compartment for the arrival of the Mini-Research Module 2, installed docking antenna for the module, photographed antenna for evaluation on the ground, and photographed the Strela-2 crane.			
125.	Expedition 20; EVA 2 ‡	(Russia) Gennady Padalka (United States) Michael R. Barratt	10 June 2009; 6:55	10 June 2009; 7:07	0 hours, 12 minutes
125.	Expedition 20; EVA 2 ‡	Internal spacewalk in the depressurized Zvezda transfer compartment, replaced one of the Zvezda hatches with a docking cone, in preparation for the docking of the Mini-Research Module 2, or MRM2, later this year. The MRM2 will dock automatically to the zenith port of Zvezda, and serve as an additional docking port for Russian vehicles.			
126.	STS-127; EVA 1	(United States) David Wolf (United States) Timothy L. Kopra	18 July 2009; 16:19	18 July 2009; 21:51	5 hours, 32 minutes
126.	STS-127; EVA 1	JEF installed and P3 nadir UCCAS deployed. S3 zenith outboard PAS deploy postponed due to time constraints.			
127.	STS-127; EVA 2	(United States) David Wolf (United States) Thomas Marshburn	20 July 2009; 15:27	20 July 2009; 22:20	6 hours, 53 minutes
127.	STS-127; EVA 2	Transferred Orbital Replacement Units (ORUs) from the Shuttle Integrated Cargo Carrier (ICC) to the External Stowage Platform-3 (ESP-3). Transferred materials included a spare high-gain antenna, cooling-system pump module and spare parts for the Mobile Servicing System. JEF Visual Equipment (JEF-VE) installation on the forward section was postponed due to time constraints.			
128.	STS-127; EVA 3	(United States) David Wolf (United States) Christopher Cassidy	22 July 2009; 14:32	22 July 2009; 20:31	5 hours, 59 minutes
128.	STS-127; EVA 3	JPM preparation work, ICS-EF MLI, and P6 battery replacement (2 of 6 units). EVA was cut short due to high levels of CO_{2} in Cassidy's suit.			
129.	STS-127; EVA 4	(United States) Christopher Cassidy (United States) Thomas Marshburn	24 July 2009; 13:54	24 July 2009; 21:06	7 hours, 12 minutes
129.	STS-127; EVA 4	P6 battery replacement (final 4 of 6).			
130.	STS-127; EVA 5	(United States) Christopher Cassidy (United States) Thomas Marshburn	27 July 2009; 11:33	27 July 2009; 16:27	4 hours, 54 minutes
130.	STS-127; EVA 5	SPDM thermal cover adjustment, Z1 patch panel reconfiguration, JEM visual equipment (JEM-VE) installation (forward and aft), and JEM-LTA reconfigurations. S3 Nadir PAS (outboard) deployment postponed to later mission.			
131.	STS-128; EVA 1	(United States) John D. Olivas (United States) Nicole P. Stott	1 September 2009; 21:49	2 September 2009; 04:24	6 hours, 35 minutes
131.	STS-128; EVA 1	Prepared for the replacement of an empty ammonia tank on the station's port truss by releasing its bolts. Retrieved the MISSE-6 and EuTEF experiments mounted outside of Columbus, and stowed them in the Shuttle's payload bay for their return to Earth. (Stott became the 9th American woman to perform an EVA, and the 10th woman spacewalker.)			
132.	STS-128; EVA 2	(United States) John D. Olivas (Sweden) Christer Fuglesang	3 September 2009; 22:13	4 September 2009; 04:51	6 hours, 39 minutes
132.	STS-128; EVA 2	Removed the new ammonia tank from the shuttle's payload bay and replaced it with the used tank from the station. The new tank, weighing about 1,800 pounds (820 kg), was the most mass ever moved by spacewalking astronauts.			
133.	STS-128; EVA 3	(United States) John D. Olivas (Sweden) Christer Fuglesang	5 September 2009; 20:39	6 September 2009; 03:40	7 hours, 01 minute
133.	STS-128; EVA 3	Prepared for the arrival of Tranquility by attaching cables between the starboard truss and Unity, the area where Tranquility will be installed. The spacewalkers also replaced a communications sensor device, installed two new GPS antennas, deployed the PAS on the S3 truss, and replaced a circuit breaker.			
134.	STS-129; EVA 1	(United States) Michael Foreman (United States) Robert Satcher	19 November 2009; 14:24	19 November 2009; 21:01	6 hours, 37 minutes
134.	STS-129; EVA 1	Installed a spare antenna on the station's truss and a bracket for ammonia lines on Unity. Lubricated the grapple mechanism on the Payload Orbital Replacement Unit Attachment Device on the Mobile Base System and lubricated the snares of the hand of the station's Japanese robotic arm. Deployed the S3 outboard Payload Attach System.			
135.	STS-129; EVA 2	(United States) Michael Foreman (United States) Randolph Bresnik	21 November 2009; 14:31	21 November 2009; 20:39	6 hours, 08 minutes
135.	STS-129; EVA 2	Installed the GATOR (Grappling Adaptor to On-Orbit Railing) bracket to Columbus and an additional ham radio antenna. Installed on the truss an antenna for wireless helmet camera video. Relocated the Floating Potential Measurement Unit that records electrical potential around the station as it orbits the Earth. Deployed two brackets to attach cargo on the truss.			
136.	STS-129; EVA 3	(United States) Robert Satcher (United States) Randolph Bresnik	23 November 2009; 13:24	23 November 2009; 19:06	5 hours, 42 minutes
136.	STS-129; EVA 3	Installed a new High Pressure Gas Tank (HPGT) on the Quest airlock. Installed MISSE-7A and 7B on ELC-2. Strapped two micrometeoroid and orbital debris (MMOD) shields to External Stowage Platform #2. Relocated foot restraint, released a bolt on Ammonia Tank Assembly, installed insulated covers on cameras on mobile servicing system and Canadarm 2's end effector. Worked heater cables on docking adapter.			

== 2010 ==
#	Mission	Spacewalkers	Start (UTC)	End (UTC)	Duration
137.	Expedition 22; EVA 1 *	(Russia) Oleg Kotov (Russia) Maksim Surayev	14 January 2010; 10:05	14 January 2010; 15:49	5 hours, 44 minutes
137.	Expedition 22; EVA 1 *	Prepared the Poisk module for future dockings.			
138.	STS-130; EVA 1	(United States) Robert L. Behnken (United States) Nicholas Patrick	12 February 2010; 02:17	12 February 2010; 08:49	6 hours, 32 minutes
138.	STS-130; EVA 1	Removed a protective cover on a port on the Unity node where Tranquility was berthed halfway through the spacewalk. The pair then transferred a spare parts platform for the Special Purpose Dexterous Manipulator from the shuttle to the station. Behnken and Patrick then made several connections on the newly installed Tranquility node to begin its activation.			
139.	STS-130; EVA 2	(United States) Robert L. Behnken (United States) Nicholas Patrick	14 February 2010; 02:20	14 February 2010; 08:14	5 hours, 54 minutes
139.	STS-130; EVA 2	Installed ammonia plumbing and connectors between Unity, Destiny and Tranquility and covered them with thermal insulation. Prepare the nadir port on Tranquility for the relocation of the Cupola, and installed handrails on the exterior of Tranquility.			
140.	STS-130; EVA 3	(United States) Robert L. Behnken (United States) Nicholas Patrick	17 February 2010; 02:15	17 February 2010; 08:03	5 hours, 48 minutes
140.	STS-130; EVA 3	Installed additional ammonia plumbing between Unity and Tranquility, removed insulation and launch locks from the Cupola, installed additional handrails on the exterior of Tranquility and performed get-ahead tasks to support the installation of a PDGF on the exterior of Zarya with cable installation on Unity and the S0 truss.			
141.	STS-131; EVA 1	(United States) Richard Mastracchio (United States) Clayton Anderson	9 April 2010; 05:31	9 April 2010; 11:58	6 hours, 27 minutes
141.	STS-131; EVA 1	Relocated new ammonia tank from the Shuttle's payload bay to a temporary stowage location and disconnected the fluid lines to the old ammonia tank on the S1 truss. Retrieved a Japanese seed experiment from the exterior of the Kibo laboratory for return to earth and replaced a failed gyroscope on the S0 truss. Performed get-ahead tasks including the opening of a window flap on the zenith CBM of Harmony, and removed launch restraint bolts from a Flex Hose Rotary Coupler (FHRC) on the P1 truss.			
142.	STS-131; EVA 2	(United States) Richard Mastracchio (United States) Clayton Anderson	11 April 2010; 05:20	11 April 2010; 12:56	7 hours, 26 minutes
142.	STS-131; EVA 2	The old ammonia tank was removed from the S1 truss and was replaced with the new tank. The electrical connections to the tank were made, but the fluid lines were deferred to the mission's third EVA due to time constraints since the installation was prolonged by a problem with the bolts that hold the tank to the truss. The old tank was relocated to a temporary stowage location on the station and a foot restraint was relocated in preparation for a future shuttle mission's spacewalk.			
143.	STS-131; EVA 3	(United States) Richard Mastracchio (United States) Clayton Anderson	13 April 2010; 06:14	13 April 2010; 12:36	6 hours, 24 minutes
143.	STS-131; EVA 3	The fluid lines were connected to the new ammonia tank and the old tank was moved to the shuttle's payload bay for return to Earth. Micro-meteoroid debris shields from the Quest airlock which were no longer necessary were brought inside the airlock for return to Earth inside the Leonardo MPLM. The Z1 truss was prepared for the installation of a spare antenna on the next shuttle mission, and a foot restraint was relocated in preparation for a future spacewalk. The retrieval of an external carrier plate on Columbus was deferred to another shuttle mission due to time constraints after problems were encountered with attaching the old ammonia tank to a carrier in the payload bay, and several other tasks were deferred to later EVAs due to the replanning from the problems with the mission's second EVA.			
144.	STS-132; EVA 1	(United States) Garrett Reisman (United States) Stephen G. Bowen	17 May 2010; 11:54	17 May 2010; 19:19	7 hours, 25 minutes
144.	STS-132; EVA 1	Installed a spare space-to-ground Ku-band antenna on the Z1 truss; installed new tool platform on Dextre, and broke torque on bolts holding replacement batteries to the ICC-VLD cargo carrier.			
145.	STS-132; EVA 2	(United States) Stephen G. Bowen (United States) Michael T. Good	19 May 2010; 10:38	19 May 2010; 17:47	7 hours, 09 minutes
145.	STS-132; EVA 2	Repaired Atlantis' Orbiter Boom Sensor System (OBSS); P6 battery replacement (4 of 6 units); and removed gimbal locks from the Ku-band antenna installed on the first EVA of the mission.			
146.	STS-132; EVA 3	(United States) Michael T. Good (United States) Garrett Reisman	21 May 2010; 10:27	21 May 2010; 17:13	6 hours, 46 minutes
146.	STS-132; EVA 3	P6 battery replacement (final 2 of 6 units); installed ammonia "jumpers" at the P4/P5 interface; retrieved a spare PDGF from Atlantis' payload bay and stowed it inside the Quest airlock. The spacewalkers also replenished supplies of EVA tools in toolboxes on the exterior of the station.			
147.	Expedition 24; EVA 1 *	(Russia) Fyodor Yurchikhin (Russia) Mikhail Korniyenko	27 July 2010; 04:11	27 July 2010; 10:53	6 hours, 42 minutes
147.	Expedition 24; EVA 1 *	Replaced ATV docking camera on Zvezda's rear docking port, added cables from the Zvezda and Zarya modules to connect Rassvet to the Russian command and data handling computer system, added cables between Rassvet and Zarya to allow use of the KURS automated docking system on Rassvet.			
148.	Expedition 24; EVA 2	(United States) Douglas H. Wheelock (United States) Tracy Caldwell Dyson	7 August 2010; 11:19	7 August 2010; 19:22	8 hours, 03 minutes
148.	Expedition 24; EVA 2	Attempted to replace a failed ammonia pump module located on the S1 truss. Due to an ammonia leak in the final line that needed to be disconnected from the failed pump module, the planned tasks were only partially completed, and the spacewalkers needed extra time to perform a "bake out" to ensure no ammonia entered the station following the EVA. This was the longest International Space Station-based spacewalk, and the sixth longest spacewalk in history.			
149.	Expedition 24; EVA 3	(United States) Douglas H. Wheelock (United States) Tracy Caldwell Dyson	11 August 2010; 12:27	11 August 2010; 19:53	7 hours, 26 minutes
149.	Expedition 24; EVA 3	Completed removal of failed pump module from the S1 truss and began installation preparations on the replacement pump.			
150.	Expedition 24; EVA 4	(United States) Douglas H. Wheelock (United States) Tracy Caldwell Dyson	16 August 2010; 10:20	16 August 2010; 17:40	7 hours, 20 minutes
150.	Expedition 24; EVA 4	Completion of the third contingency spacewalk to install a spare ammonia pump module on the S1 Truss.			
151.	Expedition 25; EVA 1 *	(Russia) Fyodor Yurchikhin (Russia) Oleg Skripochka	15 November 2010; 14:55	15 November 2010; 21:22	6 hours, 27 minutes
151.	Expedition 25; EVA 1 *	Installed: portable multipurpose workstation in Zvezda Plane IV; struts between Poisk and Zvezda and Zarya modules; hand-rail on Pirs docking module; SKK #1-M2 cassette on Poisk module. Removed: Plasma Pulse Injector Science hardware and Expose-R scientific experiment from portable multipurpose workstation in Zvezda Plane II; Kontur science hardware (ROKVISS); TV camera from Rassvet module. Performed Test experiment to check for microorganisms or contamination underneath insulation on the Russian ISS segment. Cosmonauts failed to relocate TV camera due to interference from insulation at installation location.			

== 2011 ==
#	Mission	Spacewalkers	Start (UTC)	End (UTC)	Duration
152.	Expedition 26; EVA 1 *	(Russia) Dmitri Kondratyev (Russia) Oleg Skripochka	21 January 2011; 14:29	21 January 2011; 19:52	5 hours, 23 minutes
152.	Expedition 26; EVA 1 *	Installed an experimental communication antenna on Zvezda's nadir side, removed and stowed a failed plasma pulse generator experiment apparatus and a material exposure experiment from Zvezda, and installed a docking TV camera on the Rassvet module.			
153.	Expedition 26; EVA 2 *	(Russia) Dmitri Kondratyev (Russia) Oleg Skripochka	16 February 2011; 13:30	16 February 2011; 18:21	4 hours, 51 minutes
153.	Expedition 26; EVA 2 *	Installed two experiments for Earth seismic and lightning observations on the Zvezda module, removed two material exposure experiment panels from the exterior of the Zarya module, and jettisoned a foot restraint overboard.			
154.	STS-133; EVA 1	(United States) Stephen Bowen (United States) Alvin Drew	28 February 2011; 15:46	28 February 2011; 22:20	6 hours, 34 minutes
154.	STS-133; EVA 1	Drew and Bowen installed a power extension cable between the Unity and Tranquility nodes to provide a contingency power source should it be required. The spacewalkers then moved the failed ammonia pump module that was replaced in August from its temporary location to the External Stowage Platform 2 adjacent to the Quest airlock. Drew and Bowen then installed a wedge under a camera on the S3 truss to provide clearance from the newly installed ELC-4. They next replaced a guide for the rail cart system used for moving the station robotic arm along the truss. The guides had been removed when astronauts were performing work on the station's starboard Solar Alpha Rotary Joint (SARJ), which rotates the solar arrays to track the sun. The final task was to "fill" a special bottle with the vacuum of space for a Japanese education payload. The bottle will be part of a public museum exhibit.			
155.	STS-133; EVA 2	(United States) Stephen Bowen (United States) Alvin Drew	2 March 2011; 15:42	2 March 2011; 21:56	6 hours, 14 minutes
155.	STS-133; EVA 2	Drew removed thermal insulation from a platform, while Bowen swapped out an attachment bracket on the Columbus module. Bowen then installed a camera assembly on the Dextre robot and removed insulation from Dextre's electronics platform. Drew installed a light on a cargo cart and repaired some dislodged thermal insulation from a valve on the truss.			
156.	STS-134; EVA 1	(United States) Andrew Feustel (United States) Gregory Chamitoff	20 May 2011; 07:10	20 May 2011; 13:29	6 hours, 19 minutes
156.	STS-134; EVA 1	Feustel and Chamitoff retrieved the two MISSE 7 experiments and installed a new package of MISSE 8 experiments on ELC-2, which was already on the station. They installed jumpers between segments on the left-side truss, or backbone of the station, for ammonia refills; vented nitrogen from an ammonia servicer; they began to install an external wireless communication antenna on the Destiny laboratory that will provide wireless communication to the Express Logistics Carriers mounted on the station's truss, but was cut short due to a bad CO_{2} sensor in Chamitoff's suit.			
157.	STS-134; EVA 2	(United States) Andrew Feustel (United States) Michael Fincke	22 May 2011; 6:05	22 May 2011; 14:12	8 hours, 07 minutes
157.	STS-134; EVA 2	Feustel and Fincke refilled the Port 6 (P5) radiators with ammonia. They completed venting the early ammonia system, lubricated the port solar alpha rotary joint and parts of Dextre, a two-armed space station robot capable of handling delicate assembly tasks currently performed by spacewalkers. Fincke also installed grapple bars on the port radiators.			
158.	STS-134; EVA 3	(United States) Andrew Feustel (United States) Michael Fincke	25 May 2011; 05:43	25 May 2011; 12:37	6 hours, 54 minutes
158.	STS-134; EVA 3	Feustel and Fincke installed a grapple fixture (a handle for the station's Canadarm2 to grab on to) on the Zarya module, to support robotic operations based from the Russian segment. They also installed additional cables to provide backup power to the Russian portion of the space station. The pair finished installing the wireless video system that was left unfinished during EVA 1.			
159.	STS-134; EVA 4	(United States) Michael Fincke (United States) Gregory Chamitoff	27 May 2011; 04:15	27 May 2011; 11:39	7 hours, 24 minutes
159.	STS-134; EVA 4	Fincke and Chamitoff stowed the shuttle's 50-foot Orbiter Boom Sensor System (OBSS) on the right-side truss on a permanent stowage fixture. The pair then retrieved a grapple from the station's left-side truss and used it as a replacement for the grapple currently on the boom. They then released restraints from one of the arms spare arms for Dextre and replaced thermal insulation on one of the spare gas tanks for the Quest airlock. The arrival of the PMM module marked the completion of the US Orbital Segment. This was the final EVA from the Space Shuttle before its retirement.			
160.	Expedition 28; EVA 1	(United States) Ronald J. Garan Jr. (United States) Michael E. Fossum	12 July 2011; 13:22	12 July 2011; 19:53	6 hours, 31 minutes
160.	Expedition 28; EVA 1	This spacewalk was kind of special in that it was the last spacewalk performed while a space shuttle was docked to the station. However, other than the previous spacewalks during docked operations, this one was performed by the station crew and not by the space shuttle crew. The need for this spacewalk arose since a failed pump module on the station should be returned for inspection to the ground on the space shuttle. This having been the main objective done during this EVA the spacewalkers also installed a Robotic Refueling Mission experiment and fully deployed the MISSE 8 experiment (which was only half deployed during a previous spacewalk).			
161.	Expedition 28; EVA 2 *	(Russia) Sergei Volkov (Russia) Aleksandr Samokutyayev	3 August 2011; 14:50	3 August 2011; 21:13	6 hours, 23 minutes
161.	Expedition 28; EVA 2 *	The spacewalkers installed laser communications equipment, which eventually will test transmissions of up to 100 Mbit/s of Russian science data with the ground on the Zvezda service module. Radioskaf-V, a small satellite for a student experiment, was deployed and an antenna, which was used for the docking of Poisk, was removed and brought back into the station. As part of the research work on the station, the BIORISK experiment was installed on a handrail outside Pirs. Last but not least, photographs were taken, including some of an antenna with signs of degraded performance to support engineers on the ground to trouble-shoot the cause of the degradation. Due to time constraints, the task to relocate the STEAL-1 cargo boom was canceled for this EVA.			

== 2012 ==
#	Mission	Spacewalkers	Start (UTC)	End (UTC)	Duration
162.	Expedition 30; EVA 1 *	(Russia) Oleg Kononenko (Russia) Anton Shkaplerov	16 February 2012; 14:31	16 February 2012; 20:46	6 hours, 15 minutes
162.	Expedition 30; EVA 1 *	In preparation for the upcoming undocking of the Pirs docking compartment, the Strela 1 Equipment Crane was relocated from that module to the Mini-Research Module 2. In addition, an experiment module which exposed materials to the space environment was retrieved while another experiment, the Vynoslivost Sample Experiment, was installed on handrails on MRM2. Out of two hardware units for the TEST experiment, just one unit was installed before time for the EVA ran out. The scheduled task to install five shields on Zvezda to shield it from micrometeoroid debris was also cancelled and rescheduled to be done during the next EVA.			
163.	Expedition 32; EVA 1 *	(Russia) Gennady Padalka (Russia) Yuri Malenchenko	20 August 2012; 15:37	20 August 2012; 21:28	5 hours, 51 minutes
163.	Expedition 32; EVA 1 *	During this spacewalk, the Strela 2 telescoping boom was relocated from the Pirs docking compartment to the Zarya control module in preparation for the upcoming undocking of Pirs, which paves the way for the arrival of the new Russian Multipurpose Laboratory Module in 2013. The second task was to install micrometeoroid debris shields on the Zvezda service module. Additionally, a small satellite was deployed which is used by ground controllers to perform tracking tests used to help tracking actual space debris. Last but not least, the spacewalkers added support struts to an airlock ladder and retrieved a Biorisk sample container. Retrieving another example container of a material exposure experiment failed due to a stuck hinge that prevented it from folding close.			
164.	Expedition 32; EVA 2	(United States) Sunita Williams (Japan) Akihiko Hoshide	30 August 2012; 12:16	30 August 2012; 20:33	8 hours, 17 minutes
164.	Expedition 32; EVA 2	The main objective for this EVA is to replace the Main Bus Switching Unit (MBSU) 1, which showed preliminary indications of failure in October 2011 with a replacement unit. Furthermore, in preparation of the integration of the new Russian module (the Multipurpose Laboratory Module), some cables will be routed. If time permits, debris and thermal covers will be installed on PMA-2.			
165.	Expedition 32; EVA 3	(United States) Sunita Williams (Japan) Akihiko Hoshide	5 September 2012; 11:06	5 September 2012; 17:34	6 hours, 28 minutes
165.	Expedition 32; EVA 3	Installed the new MBSU unit, working around difficulty with one of the bolts; replaced one of the cameras mounted on the CanadArm. During this spacewalk, Sunita Williams broke Peggy Whitson's record for most total time spacewalking by a woman.			
166.	Expedition 33; EVA 1	(United States) Sunita Williams (Japan) Akihiko Hoshide	1 November 2012; 12:29	1 November 2012; 19:07	6 hours, 38 minutes
166.	Expedition 33; EVA 1	Reconfigured and isolated a leak in the ammonia cooling system of power channel 2B on the P6 truss by-passing a leaking cooling loop and re-connecting jumpers to an unused loop of the Early External Thermal Control System (EETCS), and by re-deploying the trailing Thermal Control Radiator of the system.			

== 2013 ==
#	Mission	Spacewalkers	Start (UTC)	End (UTC)	Duration
167.	Expedition 35; EVA 1 *	(Russia) Pavel Vinogradov (Russia) Roman Romanenko	19 April 2013; 14:03	19 April 2013; 20:41	6 hours, 38 minutes
167.	Expedition 35; EVA 1 *	Installed the Obstanovka plasma waves and ionosphere experiment to the exterior of the Zvezda service module. Also replaced a faulty retro-reflector device used as navigational aids for the Automatic Transfer Vehicle and retrieved the Biorisk microbe exposure experiment. An attempt to retrieve the Vinoslivost materials sample experiment failed when it was accidentally dropped while being taken back to the Pirs module airlock.			
168.	Expedition 35; EVA 2	(United States) Thomas Marshburn (United States) Christopher Cassidy	11 May 2013; 12:44	11 May 2013; 18:14	5 hours, 30 minutes
168.	Expedition 35; EVA 2	Known as US EVA 21. Inspected and replaced a Pump Flow Control Subassembly on the station's P6 truss which was leaking ammonia coolant. This was the same leaking thermal system from US EVA 20, performed on 1 November 2012.			
169.	Expedition 36; EVA 1 *	(Russia) Fyodor Yurchikhin (Russia) Alexander Misurkin	24 June 2013; 13:32	24 June 2013; 20:06	6 hours, 34 minutes
169.	Expedition 36; EVA 1 *	Replaced a fluid flow regulator on the Zarya module, testing of the Kurs docking system on the station ahead of the arrival of a new Russian module, installing the "Indicator" experiment, installing gap spanners on to the outside of the station and photographing the multilayer insulation (MLI) protecting the Russian segment from micrometeoroids and taking samples from the exterior surface of the pressure hull underneath the MLI to identify signs of pressure hull material microscopic deterioration.			
170.	Expedition 36; EVA 2	(United States) Christopher Cassidy (Italy) Luca Parmitano	9 July 2013; 12:02	9 July 2013; 18:09	6 hours, 07 minutes
170.	Expedition 36; EVA 2	Known as US EVA 22. Replaced a failed Space-to-Ground Transmitter Receiver Controller and the Mobile Base Camera Light Pan-Tilt Assembly, retrieved the MISSE-8 and ORMatE-III experiments, photographed the AMS-02, moved two Radiator Grapple Bars to either sides of the truss, routed power cables to support the addition of the new Russian MLM and installed a multi-layer insulation cover to protect the docking interface of PMA-2.			
171.	Expedition 36; EVA 3	(United States) Christopher Cassidy (Italy) Luca Parmitano	16 July 2013; 11:57	16 July 2013; 13:29	1 hour, 32 minutes
171.	Expedition 36; EVA 3	Known as US EVA 23. Installed a Y-bypass jumper on power lines on the Z1 truss, routing 1553 data cables for a grapple fixture and Ethernet cables for a future Russian station module. The spacewalk was then cut short after Parmitano reported excess water leaking inside his helmet. NASA astronaut Shane Kimbrough was Ground IV.			
172.	Expedition 36; EVA 4 *	(Russia) Fyodor Yurchikhin (Russia) Alexander Misurkin	16 August 2013; 14:36	16 August 2013; 22:05	7 hours, 29 minutes
172.	Expedition 36; EVA 4 *	The cosmonauts successfully unreeled and routed two long power lines and an Ethernet cable along the outside of the Zarya storage module that will be connected to the new Nauka laboratory after its arrival next year. Misurkin also mounted a space exposure experiment pallet on a handrail outside the upper Poisk module. The cosmonauts extended a telescoping space crane early on to help move large cable reels from Pirs to Zarya It was the 172nd EVA and with the seven-hour 29-minute duration set a new Russian spacewalk record, eclipsing the old mark of seven hours and 16 minutes set by two cosmonauts outside the Mir space station in July 1990.			
173.	Expedition 36; EVA 5 *	(Russia) Fyodor Yurchikhin (Russia) Alexander Misurkin	22 August 2013; 11:34	22 August 2013; 17:32	5 hours, 58 minutes
173.	Expedition 36; EVA 5 *	Removed a laser communication and installed an EVA work station and camera pointing platform outside the Zvezda service module, inspection and tightening of various antenna covers on Zvezda, and installed new spacewalk aids.			
174.	Expedition 37; EVA 1 *	(Russia) Oleg Kotov (Russia) Sergei Ryazanski	9 November 2013; 14:34	9 November 2013; 20:24	5 hours, 50 minutes
174.	Expedition 37; EVA 1 *	Took the Olympic torch for the 2014 Winter Olympic Games to the outside of ISS. They also continued work on an extravehicular activity workstation and biaxial pointing platform by removing launch brackets and bolts, as well as retrieving an experimental package. The planned installation of a foot restraint on the mounting seat of the workstation was deferred to a future spacewalk after the spacewalkers noticed some issues with its alignment.			
175.	Expedition 38; EVA 1	(United States) Richard Mastracchio (United States) Michael S. Hopkins	21 December 2013; 12:01	21 December 2013; 17:29	5 hours, 28 minutes
175.	Expedition 38; EVA 1	The first of multiple spacewalks needed after cooling line temperatures decreased due to a stuck internal valve, which led to the deterioration of an ammonia pump module. The astronauts took the module out of the Active Thermal Control System's Loop A. They also connected two ammonia fluid lines to a jumper box after disconnecting them from the pump module. Two other lines were disconnected and stowed inside a thermal blanket.			
176.	Expedition 38; EVA 2	(United States) Michael S. Hopkins (United States) Richard Mastracchio	24 December 2013; 11:53	24 December 2013; 19:23	7 hours, 30 minutes
176.	Expedition 38; EVA 2	Retrieved spare ammonia pump module, installed it on starboard truss, and connected it to Loop A of Active Thermal Control System.			
177.	Expedition 38; EVA 3 *	(Russia) Oleg Kotov (Russia) Sergei Ryazanski	27 December 2013; 13:00	27 December 2013; 21:07	8 hours, 07 minutes
177.	Expedition 38; EVA 3 *	Attempted installation of 2 HD cameras for commercial Earth observation on the outside of the Zvezda module, cancelled after one of the cameras failed to provide data to the ground during testing. Also installed and jettisoned experimental equipment outside the Russian segment. Longest Russian EVA in history.			

== 2014 ==
#	Mission	Spacewalkers	Start (UTC)	End (UTC)	Duration
178.	Expedition 38; EVA 4 *	(Russia) Oleg Kotov (Russia) Sergei Ryazanski	27 January 2014; 14:00	27 January 2014; 20:08	6 hours, 08 minutes
178.	Expedition 38; EVA 4 *	Installed High Resolution Camera (HRC) on SM Plane IV; installed Medium Resolution Camera (MRC) on SM Plane IV; photographed electrical connectors on ФП11 and ФП19 connector patch panels of SM; removed Worksite Interfaces (WIF) adaptor from SSRMS LEE B; retrieved СКК #2-СО cassette container from DC-1.			
179.	Expedition 39; EVA 1	(United States) Richard Mastracchio (United States) Steven Swanson	23 April 2014; 13:56	23 April 2014; 15:32	1 hour, 36 minutes
179.	Expedition 39; EVA 1	Replaced failed Multiplexer/Demultiplexer (MDM) unit on S0 truss; also removed two lanyards from Secondary Power Distribution Assembly (SPDA) doors.			
180.	Expedition 40; EVA 1 *	(Russia) Alexander Skvortsov (Russia) Oleg Artemyev	19 June 2014; 14:10	19 June 2014; 21:33	7 hours, 23 minutes
180.	Expedition 40; EVA 1 *	Installed an automated phased antenna array used for the Russian command and telemetry system, relocated a part of the Obstanovka experiment that monitors charged particles and plasma in Low Earth Orbit, verifying the correct installation of the universal work platform (URM-D), taking samples from one of Zvezda's windows, and jettisoning an experiment frame.			
181.	Expedition 40; EVA 2 *	(Russia) Alexander Skvortsov (Russia) Oleg Artemyev	18 August 2014; 14:02	18 August 2014; 19:13	5 hours, 11 minutes
181.	Expedition 40; EVA 2 *	Released Chasqui-1 cubesat into space; installed experiment packages (EXPOSE-R2 biological experiment, Plume Impingement and Deposit Monitoring unit), retrieved experiments (Vinoslivost materials exposure panel, Biorisk biological experiment), replaced cassette on SKK experiment and attached a handrail on an antenna.			
182.	Expedition 41; EVA 1	(United States) Reid Wiseman (Germany) Alexander Gerst	7 October 2014; 12:30	7 October 2014; 18:43	6 hours, 13 minutes
182.	Expedition 41; EVA 1	Relocated failed cooling pump to External Stowage Platform-2 (ESP-2), Stowed adjustable grabble bars on ESP-2, replaced light on External Television Camera Group (ETVCG) and installation of a Mobile Transporter Relay Assembly (MTRA)			
183.	Expedition 41; EVA 2	(United States) Reid Wiseman (United States) Barry E. Wilmore	15 October 2014; 12:16	15 October 2014; 18:50	6 hours, 34 minutes
183.	Expedition 41; EVA 2	Replaced failed sequential shunt unit (SSU) for 3A power system, relocated articulating portable foot restraint/tool stanchion (APFR/TS), removed camera port (CP) 7, relocated wireless video system external transceiver assembly (WETA) from CP8 to CP11, installed external TV camera group at CP8.			
184.	Expedition 41; EVA 3 *	(Russia) Maksim Surayev (Russia) Aleksandr Samokutyayev	22 October 2014; 13:28	22 October 2014; 17:06	3 hours, 38 minutes
184.	Expedition 41; EVA 3 *	Removed and jettisoned Radiometriya experiment from Zvezda Plane II, removed EXPOSE-R experiment protective cover, took surface samples from Pirs extravehicular hatch 2 window (TEST experiment), removed and jettisoned two KURS attennas 2ACф1-1 and 2ACф1-2 from Poisk, photographed exterior of ISS Russian segment.			

== 2015 ==
#	Mission	Spacewalkers	Start (UTC)	End (UTC)	Duration
185.	Expedition 42; EVA 1	(United States) Barry E. Wilmore (United States) Terry W. Virts	21 February 2015; 12:45	21 February 2015; 19:26	6 hours, 41 minutes
185.	Expedition 42; EVA 1	Rigged and routed power and data cables at the forward end of the Harmony module as part of preparations for the installation of the International Docking Adapter at PMA-2.			
186.	Expedition 42; EVA 2	(United States) Barry E. Wilmore (United States) Terry W. Virts	25 February 2015; 11:51	25 February 2015; 18:34	6 hours, 43 minutes
186.	Expedition 42; EVA 2	Completed power and data cable routing at the forward end of the Harmony module. Removed launch locks from forward and aft berthing ports of Tranquility to prepare for relocation of the Permanent Multipurpose Module and the installation of the Bigelow Expandable Activity Module. Lubricated end effector of Canadarm2.			
187.	Expedition 42; EVA 3	(United States) Terry W. Virts (United States) Barry E. Wilmore	1 March 2015; 11:52	1 March 2015; 17:30	5 hours, 38 minutes
187.	Expedition 42; EVA 3	Finished cable routing, antenna and retro-reflector installation on both sides of the ISS truss and on other modules in preparation for the installation of the International Docking Adapter at PMA-2 and 3.			
188.	Expedition 44; EVA 1 *	(Russia) Gennady Padalka (Russia) Mikhail Korniyenko	10 August 2015; 14:20	10 August 2015; 19:51	5 hours, 31 minutes
188.	Expedition 44; EVA 1 *	Installed gap spanners on the hull of the station for facilitating movement of crew members on future spacewalks, cleaned windows of the Zvezda Service Module, install fasteners on communications antennas, replaced an aging docking antenna, photographed various locations and hardware on Zvezda and nearby modules, and retrieved a space environment experiment.			
189.	Expedition 45; EVA 1	(United States) Scott Kelly (United States) Kjell N. Lindgren	28 October 2015; 12:03	28 October 2015; 19:19	7 hours, 16 minutes
189.	Expedition 45; EVA 1	Applied a thermal cover on the Alpha Magnetic Spectrometer; lubricating one of the latching ends of the Canadarm2 robotic arm; and began work to connect power and data system cables for the future installation of docking adapters for future US crew vehicles.			
190.	Expedition 45; EVA 2	(United States) Kjell N. Lindgren (United States) Scott Kelly	6 November 2015; 11:22	6 November 2015; 19:10	7 hours, 48 minutes
190.	Expedition 45; EVA 2	Worked to restore a portion of the ISS's cooling system to its primary configuration, returning ammonia coolant levels to normal in the primary and backup radiator arrays.			
191.	Expedition 46; EVA 1	(United States) Scott Kelly (United States) Timothy Kopra	21 December 2015; 13:45	21 December 2015; 16:01	3 hours, 16 minutes
191.	Expedition 46; EVA 1	Kelly and Kopra performed an EVA to troubleshoot the starboard Crew Equipment Translation Aid (CETA) cart and Mobile Transporter (MT). The starboard CETA cart is linked to the side of the Mobile Transporter (MT), and its brake was engaged preventing MT movement. Kelly released the brake and the MT was successfully commanded by Robotic Ground Controllers to translate to Worksite 4 where it was latched and mated. In addition to the CETA cart task, Kelly and Kopra performed several get ahead activities. Kelly routed Pressurized Mating Adapter (PMA) 3 power and International Docking Adapter (IDA) Ethernet cables along Node 1. Kopra opened the Secondary Power Distribution Assembly (SPDA) doors for future Robotic operations, routed an Ethernet cable for the Multipurpose Laboratory Module (MLM), and retrieved a Scoop/D-Handle tool from a toolbox on the truss.			

== 2016 ==
#	Mission	Spacewalkers	Start (UTC)	End (UTC)	Duration
192.	Expedition 46; EVA 2	(United States) Timothy Kopra (United Kingdom) Tim Peake	15 January 2016; 12:48	15 January 2016; 17:31	4 hours, 43 minutes
192.	Expedition 46; EVA 2	Replaced 1B Shunt unit, continued installation of IDA cables. The EVA was terminated early when Kopra reported the formation of a small bubble of water inside his helmet. The main objective, replacing the SSU, was completed successfully.			
193.	Expedition 46; EVA 3 *	(Russia) Yuri Malenchenko (Russia) Sergey Volkov	3 February 2016; 12:55	3 February 2016; 17:40	4 hours, 45 minutes
193.	Expedition 46; EVA 3 *	Conducted the ‘Test’ experiment by gathering samples on different locations (the hatch of Pirs, Window #8 on Zvezda) and taking engineering photos of various areas on the aft segment of ISS, jettisoned a bundle containing a flash drive holding video messages from last year's 70th anniversary celebration of Victory Day, retrieved the EXPOSE-R astrobiology experiment, collected the CKK 2-M2 experiment cassette and replaced it with the CKK 3-M3 cassette, configured a plume-sensing payload, installed the Vinoslivost payload (another space exposure experiment) installed gap spanners on the Russian segment, and retrieved the "Restavratsiya" (Restoration) Experiment Hardware, gathering experience in the in-space application of adhesive surface coatings for future operational use in space-based repairs of external equipment.			
194.	Expedition 48; EVA 1	(United States) Jeff Williams (United States) Kate Rubins	19 August 2016; 13:04	19 August 2016; 19:02	5 hours, 58 minutes
194.	Expedition 48; EVA 1	Installation of the International Docking Adapter (IDA) and installation of cables for future IDA			
195.	Expedition 48; EVA 2	(United States) Jeff Williams (United States) Kate Rubins	1 September 2016; 11:53	1 September 2016; 17:41	6 hours, 48 minutes
195.	Expedition 48; EVA 2	The main objective of this EVA was to retract a thermal radiator on the port truss. This radiator was supposed to be retracted during Expedition 45 EVA 2 (6 November 2015) but was not completed. The radiator had been deployed on Expedition 33 EVA 1 (1 November 2012) in an attempt to isolate a coolant leak. Additional completed tasks included installing HD Video Cameras on the port/outboard side of the station (one zenith, one nadir), applying additional torque to SARJ bolts, photographing the inside of the SARJ, tying back a protective blanket covering hardware which will be robotically manipulated later, and tying back Crew and Equipment Translation Aid (CETA) Cart brake handles to keep them out of the SARJ rotation envelope.			

== 2017 ==
#	Mission	Spacewalkers	Start (UTC)	End (UTC)	Duration
196.	Expedition 50; EVA 1	(United States) Peggy Whitson (United States) Shane Kimbrough	6 January 2017; 11:23	6 January 2017; 17:55	6 hours, 32 minutes
196.	Expedition 50; EVA 1	Installed adapter plates and cables for new batteries on 3A power channel, pictures of AMS, removal of camera and routing of Ethernet cable.			
197.	Expedition 50; EVA 2	(United States) Shane Kimbrough (France) Thomas Pesquet	13 January 2017; 11:22	13 January 2017; 17:20	5 hours, 58 minutes
197.	Expedition 50; EVA 2	Primary objectives: Retrieve Adapter Plate E and F from the Express Pallet (EP), Install Adapter Plate F in Slot 6, Relocate Battery 4 to Adapter Plate F, Install Adapter Plate E in Slot 4, Retrieve and Install Adapter Plate D in Slot 2, Fasten H1 Bolts on Li-Ion Batteries in Slots 1 and 5 Get-ahead tasks: Node 3 Shields Bundle #3 Temp Stow, Mobile Transporter Relay Assembly (MTRA) Camera Light Pan and Tilt Assembly (CLPA) Swap, Latching End Effector (LEE) A Worksite Interface Fixture (WIF) Adapter R&R, S0 aft to Z1 forward (Rat's Nest) Photo Mapping, Secure Solar Array Blanket Boxes (SABB) Restraints, Relocate Shields Bundle #2 to Node 3			
198.	Expedition 50; EVA 3	(United States) Shane Kimbrough (France) Thomas Pesquet	24 March 2017; 11:24	24 March 2017; 17:58	6 hours, 34 minutes
198.	Expedition 50; EVA 3	Prepare PMA for move, install new EPIC MDM, camera work, lubricated Canadarm2 end effector, and inspected a radiator value.			
199.	Expedition 50; EVA 4	(United States) Shane Kimbrough (United States) Peggy Whitson	30 March 2017; 12:29	30 March 2017; 19:33	7 hours, 04 minutes
199.	Expedition 50; EVA 4	Remove EXT-1 MDM & install EPIC MDM, Node 3 axial shields install including replacing a lost shield with the PMA-3 cover, PMA-3 cummerbunds install, PMA-3 cover removal, PMA-3 connections, close Node 3 port CDC, inspection & cleaning of the Earth-facing berthing port of the Harmony module			
200.	Expedition 51; EVA 1	(United States) Peggy Whitson (United States) Jack D. Fischer	12 May 2017; 13:08	12 May 2017; 17:21	4 hours, 13 minutes
200.	Expedition 51; EVA 1	Replaced ExPRESS Carrier Avionics (ExPCA), installed Pressurized Mating Adapter-3 (PMA-3) forward shield, installed Alpha Magnetic Spectrometer (AMS) MIL-1553 Terminator, secured Multilayer Insulation (MLI) on Japanese Manipulator System, relocated a portable foot restrain to PMA-3			
201.	Expedition 51; EVA 2	(United States) Peggy Whitson (United States) Jack D. Fischer	23 May 2017; 12:20	23 May 2017; 15:06	2 hours, 46 minutes
201.	Expedition 51; EVA 2	Replace failed Multiplexer-Demultiplexer (MDM), installed two Wireless Communication Anntenna's			
202.	Expedition 52; EVA 1 *	(Russia) Fyodor Yurchikhin (Russia) Sergei Ryazanski	17 August 2017; 14:36	17 August 2017; 22:10	7 hours, 34 minutes
202.	Expedition 52; EVA 1 *	Retrieved the "Restavratsiya" (Restoration) Experiment Hardware, launched 5 Nano Satellites one of them being a Sputnik satellite named "Zerkalo", which was launched to commemorate the 60th anniversary of the original Sputnik and the birth of rocket scientist Konstantin Tsiolkovsky, cleaned the windows on the Russian segment and installed "Test" containers on the hatches of the Pirs Docking Compartment and the Poisk module, retrieved CKK 9M9 cassettes from Zvezda, installed Struts, Gap Spanners, and Handrails on Zvezda in preparation for the arrival of Nauka in the future, installed the "Impact" trays by the Zvezda thrusters, and photographed the aft end of Zvezda and the "OHA" Antenna, installed struts, gap spanners, handrails, and ladders on Poisk, photographed the Russian segment.			
203.	Expedition 53; EVA 1	(United States) Randy Bresnik (United States) Mark T. Vande Hei	5 October 2017; 12:05	5 October 2017; 19:00	6 hours, 55 minutes
203.	Expedition 53; EVA 1	Replaced Latching End Effector (LEE-A) on Canadarm2, removed multi-layer insulation from a spare direct current switching unit, prepared a flex hose rotary coupler			
204.	Expedition 53; EVA 2	(United States) Randy Bresnik (United States) Mark T. Vande Hei	10 October 2017; 12:56	10 October 2017; 19:22	6 hours, 26 minutes
204.	Expedition 53; EVA 2	Finished repairs to Canadarm 2 added lubricating oil to all the working parts, replaced the station's cameras, which are used to film NASA TV, installed lens covers, closed and locked a latch on the high pressure gas tanks, rotated a pump module in preparation for relocating to P6 on a future spacewalk, changed the sockets on the degraded latching end effector and reinstalled them on the new unit on Canadarm 2, removed handrails on Tranquility in preparation for installation of the EWS Antennas on a future spacewalk.			
205.	Expedition 53; EVA 3	(United States) Randy Bresnik (United States) Joseph M. Acaba	20 October 2017; 12:46	20 October 2017; 19:36	6 hours, 49 minutes
205.	Expedition 53; EVA 3	Finished repairs to Canadarm 2 added lubricating oil to all working parts and installed a camera and replaced a degraded one, replaced the station's cameras, which are used to film NASA TV, replaced a blown fuse on Dextre, removed MLI from two ORUs stored on ESP2 in preparation for them to be moved by Dextre later this year. Three get ahead task were performed by the crew MLI was removed from the pump modules on ESP2. Bresnik almost got the second one, but time expired, and he had to close the flap on the second pump module it will be moved on the next spacewalk, installed the radiator grapple bars delivered on SpaceX CRS2.			

== 2018 ==
#	Mission	Spacewalkers	Start (UTC)	End (UTC)	Duration
206.	Expedition 54; EVA 1	(United States) Mark T. Vande Hei (United States) Scott D. Tingle	23 January 2018; 11:49	23 January 2018; 19:13	7 hours, 24 minutes
206.	Expedition 54; EVA 1	Replaced Latching End Effector (LEE-B) on Canadarm2, installed failed LEE on ESP2, replaced LEE Camera, replaced EVA socket.			
207.	Expedition 54; EVA 2 *	(Russia) Alexander Misurkin (Russia) Anton Shkaplerov	2 February 2018; 15:34	2 February 2018; 23:47	8 hours, 13 minutes
207.	Expedition 54; EVA 2 *	Remove and replacement of an electronics box for a high-gain communications antenna on the Zvezda service module.			
208.	Expedition 54; EVA 3	(United States) Mark T. Vande Hei (Japan) Norishige Kanai	16 February 2018; 12:00	16 February 2018; 17:57	5 hours, 57 minutes
208.	Expedition 54; EVA 3	Finished removal and replacement of latching end effector on POA, replaced LEE Camera, installed ground strap on Canadarm2, brought failed LEE inside, lubricated Canadarm2, moved tool platform on Dextre, adjusted struts on flex hose rotary coupler.			
209.	Expedition 55; EVA 1	(United States) Andrew J. Feustel (United States) Richard R. Arnold	29 March 2018; 13:33	29 March 2018; 19:43	6 hours, 10 minutes
209.	Expedition 55; EVA 1	Installed two Wi-Fi antennas on the Node 3 module in preparation for the arrival of ECOSTRESS on SpaceX CRS-15, removed ammonia jumpers and inspected two working jumpers on the stations truss, replaced camera and lights used to film NASA TV.			
210.	Expedition 55; EVA 2	(United States) Andrew J. Feustel (United States) Richard R. Arnold	16 May 2018; 11:39	16 May 2018; 18:10	6 hours, 31 minutes
210.	Expedition 55; EVA 2	Transferred a Pump Flow Control Subassembly over to Dextre stowed failed PFCS on ESP-1, replaced camera and lights used to film NASA TV, replaced space-to-ground transceiver controller, performed get aheads to install handrails on radiator grapple bars on S1, removed thermal blankets and MLI from two direct current switching units on ESP-2, prepped the flex hose rotary coupler on S1 for replacement. Spacewalk suffered a 7-minute delay because of a water leak, which formed ice crystals inside the airlock.			
211.	Expedition 56; EVA 1	(United States) Andrew J. Feustel (United States) Richard R. Arnold	14 June 2018; 12:06	14 June 2018; 18:55	6 hours, 49 minutes
211.	Expedition 56; EVA 1	Feustel and Arnold installed new high-definition cameras near IDA 2 mated to the front end of the station's Harmony module. The additions will provide enhanced views during the final phase of approach and docking of the SpaceX Crew Dragon and Boeing CST 100 Starliner commercial crew spacecraft that will soon begin launching from American soil. The astronauts also swapped out a camera assembly on the starboard truss of the station used to film NASA TV and closed an aperture door on the CATS experiment outside the Japanese Kibo module in preparation for disposal on SpaceX CRS 15 and replacement by its successor, ECOSTRESS. Get aheads involved relocating an adjustable grapple bar to the S1 Truss and securing the flex hose rotary coupler in preparation for replacement on the next spacewalk. During the spacewalk, Feustel beat Jerry Ross, his STS 125 crewmate Dr. John Grunsfeld, Fyoder Yurchikhin, and Peggy Whitson to become third on the list of all time spacewalkers.			
212.	Expedition 56; EVA 2 *	(Russia) Oleg Artemyev (Russia) Sergey Prokopyev	15 August 2018; 16:17	15 August 2018; 00:03	7 hours, 46 minutes
212.	Expedition 56; EVA 2 *	The cosmonauts launched four cubesats and installed the Icarus experiment. Spacewalk fell behind schedule when Icarus failed to seat properly putting the spacewalk 90 minutes behind schedule and calling for an hour extension. The cosmonauts finished the spacewalk by retrieving experiments from the Pirs docking compartment and Poisk module.			
213.	Expedition 57; EVA 1 *	(Russia) Oleg Kononenko (Russia) Sergey Prokopyev	11 December 2018; 15:59	11 December 2018; 23:44	7 hours, 45 minutes
213.	Expedition 57; EVA 1 *	The cosmonauts went outside to install a plug and thermal insulation on the Soyuz MS-09 spacecraft which was damaged by a powertool causing an air leak. The cosmonauts gave Soyuz MS-09 a clean bill of health before they patched it up clearing the vessel for entry on 20 December 2018. Get ahead task included swapping experiments on the Rassvet module.			

== 2019 ==
#	Mission	Spacewalkers	Start (UTC)	End (UTC)	Duration
214.	Expedition 59; EVA 1	(United States) Anne McClain (United States) Nick Hague	22 March 2019; 13:01	22 March 2019; 19:40	6 hours, 39 minutes
214.	Expedition 59; EVA 1	McClain and Hague installed adapter plates while Dextre swapped the batteries between spacewalks. Get ahead task included removing debris from the Unity Module in preparation for the arrival of Cygnus NG-11 in April, stowing tools for the repair of the flex hose rotary coupler, and securing tiebacks on the solar array blanket boxes. This spacewalk was originally going to be carried out by European astronaut Alexander Gerst and Hague as part of Expedition 57, although it was delayed due to the Soyuz MS-10 launch abort. Anne McClain became the 13th woman to perform a spacewalk.			
215.	Expedition 59; EVA 2	(United States) Nick Hague (United States) Christina Koch	29 March 2019; 11:42	29 March 2019; 18:27	6 hours, 45 minutes
215.	Expedition 59; EVA 2	Hague and Koch finished the work of the first spacewalk and installed the final three adapter plates on the other side of the P4 Truss. The crew also transferred some tools and installed a grapple bar on the flex hose rotary coupler. Between spacewalks, Dextre changed the batteries and the exposed pallet was loaded onto HTV-8 and jettisoned into space to burn up. One of the batteries malfunctioned and was removed by Dextre and discarded. Dextre also installed a Battery Discharge Unit and bought the failed unit which was damaged by the short inside where it was returned to earth on SpaceX CRS-17. Until the battery is repaired P4 will use the old batteries left on the station as spares. Get ahead task included installing gap spanners and breaking torque on the P6 batteries in preparation for their replacement by Expedition 61 crew members that fall. Hague also inspected sockets on P6 so the foot restraints could be attached. This spacewalk was supposed to be done by Anne McClain and Christina Koch as an all female spacewalk but because of problems with Christina's suit and the spare suit not ready or properly sized Anne McClain sat this spacewalk out and went out with David on the next spacewalk. This spacewalk became the first for Koch who became the 14th woman to walk in space.			
216.	Expedition 59; EVA 3	(United States) Anne McClain (Canada) David Saint-Jacques	8 April 2019; 11:31	8 April 2019; 18:00	6 hours, 29 minutes
216.	Expedition 59; EVA 3	McClain and Saint Jacques routed cables to be used as a redundant power supply for Canadarm2. The crew installed studs on the Columbus Module in preparation for the installation of the Bartolomeo exposed facility. The crew removed an adapter plate and reinstalled an old set of batteries as spares to replace a failed battery that malfunctioned on the last spacewalk. Saint Jacques became the fourth Canadian to do a spacewalk, the first Canadian ISS crew member to walk in space, and the first Canadian spacewalker since Dafydd Williams.			
217.	Expedition 59; EVA 4 *	(Russia) Oleg Kononenko (Russia) Aleksey Ovichinin	29 May 2019; 15:42	29 May 2019; 21:43	6 hours, 01 minute
217.	Expedition 59; EVA 4 *	Kononenko and Ovichinin removed experiments from the Pirs docking compartment and cleaned the windows. They also installed a ladder to connect Zarya to Poisk and re-positioned the Plume Measuring Unit. The crew then moved to the Zvezda Service Module and removed and jettisoned the Plasma Monitoring Units. Before they closed the hatch they sent a video of themselves and sang happy birthday in Russian to Alexei Leonov who was the first spacewalker and was celebrating his 85th birthday.			
218.	Expedition 60; EVA 1	(United States) Nick Hague (United States) Andrew R. Morgan	21 August 2019; 12:27	21 August 2019; 18:59	6 hours, 32 minutes
218.	Expedition 60; EVA 1	Hague and Morgan installed the final International Docking Adapter on the Harmony Module. Task for this spacewalk were identical to Spacewalk 194 and required work by both spacewalkers and Dextre to get the docking port installed. The crew also routed cables and installed Wi-Fi routers for upcoming experiments.			
219.	Expedition 61; EVA 1	(United States) Christina Koch (United States) Andrew R. Morgan	6 October 2019; 11:39	6 October 2019; 18:40	7 hours, 01 minute
219.	Expedition 61; EVA 1	This spacewalk was the first of Expedition 61 and the first of a series of 5 to replace and improve ISS batteries on the P6 truss.			
220.	Expedition 61; EVA 2	(United States) Andrew R. Morgan (United States) Christina Koch	11 October 2019; 11:38	11 October 2019; 18:23	6 hours, 45 minutes
220.	Expedition 61; EVA 2	This spacewalk was the second of Expedition 61 and the second of a series of 5 to replace and improve ISS batteries on the P6 truss. Before they went out the hatch Mission Control Moscow relayed to the crew Alexei Leonov had died and this spacewalk is dedicated to him. As the crew came in and took off their suits each gave a choice of words before station commander Luca Parmitano said "Farewell Alexei, and ad astra."			
221.	Expedition 61; EVA 3	(United States) Christina Koch (United States) Jessica Meir	18 October 2019; 11:38	18 October 2019; 18:55	7 hours, 17 minutes
221.	Expedition 61; EVA 3	This spacewalk was the third of Expedition 61 and the third of a series of 5 to replace and improve ISS batteries on the P6 truss. Some of the battery swaps have been moved to EVA 225 and a later date because of a power failure in a Battery Charge Discharge Unit in slots 5 and 6 on the P6 Truss taking the 4B battery channel offline. Koch and Meir went outside and replaced the failed unit and brought it inside. The battery swap was moved to EVA 225 to save time and Meir and Koch wrapped up the spacewalk by installing a stanchion on the Columbus Module and tightening the bolts on the S0 Truss which had come loose. This was the first all-female spacewalk on the station. During the spacewalk, US president Donald Trump called the station and congratulated Koch and Meir on this milestone.			
222.	Expedition 61; EVA 4	(Italy) Luca Parmitano (United States) Andrew R. Morgan	15 November 2019; 11:39	15 November 2019; 18:18	6 hours, 39 minutes
222.	Expedition 61; EVA 4	First of a series of four spacewalks to repair the Alpha Magnetic Spectrometer which suffered a power failure last year in one of its four cooling pumps limiting the operation of the experiment. Parmitano and Morgan went outside and removed a cover plate from AMS and jettisoned it into space to make way for a cryo pump that they will assemble between spacewalks. Some of the bolts put up a fight but Parmitano got them all out. The highlight of the spacewalk is when Andrew R. Morgan threw the cover plate overboard and it drifted off aft of the station into the vacuum of space. The plate will stay in orbit for a few days until the end of December when it enters the atmosphere and burns up. The crew also removed several carbon fiber strips around fluid lines and installed handrails and grapple bars as get-ahead task. This spacewalk marks Parmitano's return to spacewalking after the Water in the Helmet Incident during EVA 171.			
223.	Expedition 61; EVA 5	(Italy) Luca Parmitano (United States) Andrew R. Morgan	22 November 2019; 12:02	22 November 2019; 16:35	6 hours, 33 minutes
223.	Expedition 61; EVA 5	The second in a series of four spacewalks to repair the AMS. Parmitano and Morgan cut fluid lines and installed a vent on the AMS Experiment to prep the old cooling pump for removal on the third spacewalk. Parmitano and Morgan also routed cables and installed a new power supply to power the pumps when they are installed on the third spacewalk.			
224.	Expedition 61; EVA 6	(Italy) Luca Parmitano (United States) Andrew R. Morgan	2 December 2019; 11:31	2 December 2019; 17:33	6 hours, 02 minutes
224.	Expedition 61; EVA 6	The third in a series of four spacewalks to repair the AMS. Parmitano and Morgan went out on the third spacewalk and installed the cryo pump and routed fluid and electrical lines to power the pump. Flight controllers in Houston, Huntsville, and at CERN activated the experiment and radioed to the crew that AMS passed with flying colors. The crew finished the spacewalk by doing a get-ahead task by covering AMS with thermal blanket.			

== 2020 ==
#	Mission	Spacewalkers	Start (UTC)	End (UTC)	Duration
225.	Expedition 61; EVA 7	(United States) Christina Koch (United States) Jessica Meir	15 January 2020; 11:35	15 January 2020; 19:04	7 hours, 29 minutes
225.	Expedition 61; EVA 7	The fourth in a series of five spacewalks to replace the batteries on the P6 Truss. Spacewalk suffered a 15-minute delay when Koch lost her helmet lights and camera. Meir managed to attach a hook onto the camera to prevent it from floating away and stowed it in Koch's tool bag. The spacewalkers managed to replace two batteries plus a third as a getahead task and had to stay in signal range of the WETA antennas, so Meir could check on Koch at night, who did not have any helmet lights. The spacewalkers replaced the camera between spacewalks and headed back out to replace the final three batteries on the next spacewalk.			
226.	Expedition 61; EVA 8	(United States) Christina Koch (United States) Jessica Meir	20 January 2020; 11:35	20 January 2020; 18:33	6 hours, 58 minutes
226.	Expedition 61; EVA 8	The fifth and final in a series of five spacewalks to replace the batteries on the P6 Truss. Koch and Meir managed to get all the batteries replaced and stored two old ones on the exposed pallet to return to Earth on Kounotori 9, where they were incinerated on reentry. Koch and Meir finished the day by sending down a message to commemorate Martin Luther King Jr. Day. This spacewalk moved Koch up to third place and Meir up to fourth place on the all-time female spacewalker list.			
227.	Expedition 61; EVA 9	(United States) Andrew R. Morgan (Italy) Luca Parmitano	25 January 2020; 12:04	25 January 2020; 18:20	6 hours, 16 minutes
227.	Expedition 61; EVA 9	The fourth and final in a series of four spacewalks to repair the AMS. Spacewalk suffered a 10-minute delay when a strap got stuck in the hatch preventing depressurization of the airlock. The two spacewalkers completed all the task and at 17:30 hours Luca Parmitano opened a valve to start the flow of CO2 gas to AMS and contacted CERN to turn the experiment on. AMS passed all test and worked flawlessly. A leak was found in a cooling line but Parmitano patched it and the spacewalk resumed without incident. As a getahead task, Parmitano and Morgan cleaned and replaced glare filters on the NASA TV cameras used to film the spacewalk.			
228.	Expedition 63; EVA 1	(United States) Chris Cassidy (United States) Robert Behnken	26 June 2020; 11:32	26 June 2020; 17:39	6 hours, 07 minutes
228.	Expedition 63; EVA 1	First in a series of four spacewalks to replace old Nickel-hydrogen batteries on the ISS S6 Truss segment with new Lithium-ion batteries. Behnken is not a member of the Expedition 63 crew but instead is flying as Joint Operations Commander on SpaceX's Crew Dragon Demo-2 mission, which was extended so that the mission's two crew members could support ISS operations for an extended period of time. At the conclusion of the spacewalk, the two batteries were turned on and the ground reported that they were working and that there were no signs of a short.			
229.	Expedition 63; EVA 2	(United States) Chris Cassidy (United States) Robert Behnken	1 July 2020; 11:13	1 July 2020; 16:14	6 hours, 01 minute
229.	Expedition 63; EVA 2	Second in a series of four spacewalks to replace old nickel-hydrogen batteries on the ISS S6 Truss segment with new lithium-ion batteries. Route cables for a new wireless communications system.			
230.	Expedition 63; EVA 3	(United States) Chris Cassidy (United States) Robert Behnken	16 July 2020; 11:10	16 July 2020; 17:10	6 hours, 00 minutes
230.	Expedition 63; EVA 3	Third in a series of four spacewalks to replace old nickel-hydrogen batteries on the S6 Truss segment with new lithium-ion batteries. That work was completed with this EVA. Installed a high-definition camera boom on the inboard power truss and begin preparations of Tranquility (Node 3) port for installation of the Bishop Airlock Module.			
231.	Expedition 63; EVA 4	(United States) Chris Cassidy (United States) Robert Behnken	21 July 2020; 11:12	21 July 2020; 16:41	5 hours, 29 minutes
231.	Expedition 63; EVA 4	Fourth in a series of four spacewalks for Expedition 63. Install robotics tool box on a rail-mounted carrier used to move the station's robot arm from one worksite to another, remove two of six ground-handling "H" fixtures at the base of the solar wings for future upgrades, routing and connecting Ethernet cables for external experiment data transmission, and conclude preparations of Tranquility (Node 3) port for installation of the Nanoracks Bishop Airlock (CRS-21).			
232.	Expedition 64; EVA 1^	(Russia) Sergey Ryzhikov (Russia) Sergey Kud-Sverchkov	18 November 2020; 15:12	18 November 2020; 22:00	6 hours, 48 minutes
232.	Expedition 64; EVA 1^	First in a series of spacewalks to decommission the Pirs Airlock which is scheduled to be replaced by Nauka in the summer of 2021. Task involved testing Poisk so the crew can egress, performing leak checks on the hatch, moving an antenna over to Poisk, cleaning Zvezda's windows, repositioning the Plume Measuring Unit on the Poisk module, retrieving and replacing an Impact panel on Zvezda, and replacing a fluid flow regulator on Zarya. Spacewalk faced a delay when the bolt on the catch of the pressurized container did not release and the cosmonauts had the wrong socket wrench for the task. The fluid flow regulator will be replaced at a later date with a new unit once the pressurized container is fixed. Because of time the window cleaning was also moved to another spacewalk because the task is non critical.			

== 2021 ==
#	Mission	Spacewalkers	Start (UTC)	End (UTC)	Duration
233.	Expedition 64; EVA 2	(United States) Michael Hopkins (United States) Victor Glover	27 January 2021; 11:28	27 January 2021; 18:24	6 hours, 56 minutes
233.	Expedition 64; EVA 2	Spacewalk to activate and install the Airbus Bartolomeo exposed experiment platform and the Columbus Ka band Terminal (COL-Ka) onto Columbus. Remove H fixtures from the P-6 Truss in preparation for installation of upgrades to the solar arrays. Due to issues with the installation of Bartolomeo, only four out of the six cables could be installed. The platform is "partially operational and in a safe configuration" according to NASA; the final two cables will be installed on a future spacewalk. ESA astronaut Andreas Mogensen was Ground IV.			
234.	Expedition 64; EVA 3	(United States) Michael Hopkins (United States) Victor Glover	1 February 2021; 12:56	1 February 2021; 18:16	5 hours, 20 minutes
234.	Expedition 64; EVA 3	Installed a new lithium-ion battery on the P-4 truss, where an earlier lithium replacement blew a fuse in April 2019. Upgraded high definition video and camera gear on ISS exterior and Kibō Robotic Arm. Removed H fixtures on the P-4 in preparation for installation of upgrades to the solar arrays.			
235.	Expedition 64; EVA 4	(United States) Kathleen Rubins (United States) Victor Glover	28 February 2021; 11:12	28 February 2021; 18:16	7 hours, 04 minutes
235.	Expedition 64; EVA 4	Installed 2B modification kit to prepare Station for new solar array installation. If time allows they will also assemble the 4B modification kit and stow the brackets for installation of the new solar arrays. Due to issues with the 2B array one of the bolts failed to engage so Rubins backed it out and tightened it with a torque wrench before engaging it with her drill placing the upgrade kit in a safe configuration. The spacewalkers started work on the 4B array before time ran out and only got the triangles and one of the struts installed. The final struts will be installed on the next spacewalk and the next group will bring tools to tighten the bolts on the 2B array. NASA astronaut Frank Rubio was Ground IV.			
236.	Expedition 64; EVA 5	(United States) Kathleen Rubins (Japan) Soichi Noguchi	5 March 2021; 11:37	5 March 2021; 18:33	6 hours, 56 minutes
236.	Expedition 64; EVA 5	Finished installation of the 4B modification kit. Some of the bolts did not engage but Rubins left them in a safe configuration. Because of time some of the task on this spacewalk were moved to the next spacewalk. Rubins and Noguchi finished the spacewalk by relocating their foot restraints for the next spacewalk.			
237.	Expedition 64; EVA 6	(United States) Michael Hopkins (United States) Victor Glover	13 March 2021; 13:14	13 March 2021; 20:01	6 hours, 47 minutes
237.	Expedition 64; EVA 6	Vented ammonia jumpers on P6, Installed WETA Antennas and Ethernet Routers on the Unity Module and Camera 9 on the truss, installed stiffiners on the Quest Airlock and cleaned the Bartolomeo jumper cables and activated the module. Spacewalk faced a delay in setup because of issues with Hopkin's snoopy cap. The cap will be returned to Houston and replaced. Because of time the task to install cable clamps on Bartolomeo and to route an Ethernet router on the S6 Truss were moved to a later spacewalk.			
238.	Expedition 65; EVA 1^	(Russia) Oleg Novitsky (Russia) Pyotr Dubrov	2 June 2021; 05:53	2 June 2021; 13:12	7 hours, 19 minutes
238.	Expedition 65; EVA 1^	Second in a series of spacewalks to decommission the Pirs Airlock which is scheduled to be replaced by Nauka in the summer of 2021. Task involve installing a flow control valve on Zarya, removing docking antennas and their cables on Pirs, removing EVA gap spanners from Pirs, transferring experiments over to Poisk, installing Test containers on the hatches, and relocating a Strela crane over to Poisk. Getahead task involve cleaning the windows on the Russian segment, and doing an inspection of Zvezda and plugging any leaks they find. Because of time the cosmonauts did not get to the getahead task because of a late start and issues with the hatch on the pressurized container. These task will be done on the next spacewalk when Roscosmos makes sure they have safe conditions to perform the task.			
239.	Expedition 65; EVA 2	(France) Thomas Pesquet (United States) Shane Kimbrough	16 June 2021; 12:11	16 June 2021; 19:26	7 hours, 15 minutes
239.	Expedition 65; EVA 2	First in a series of spacewalks to install the iROSA solar arrays on the P6 Truss. While working on releasing the arrays from their launch carrier, Kimbrough's spacesuit experienced issues with its Display and Control Module (DCM), so he was sent back to the airlock to connect to station umbilicals to restart it. The restart was successful, although it delayed the EVA. Additionally, an issue was discovered with his suit's sublimator, which threatened to end the EVA prematurely; this was determined to be a false reading, allowing work to resume. Following this, the astronauts successfully released the solar arrays and installed them on the P6 mounting bracket. A subsequent attempt to unfold the two rolled arrays, which were folded side by side during launch, failed due to interference (blockage) from a structure near the mounting area. As the EVA was then past the six-hour mark, ground controllers instructed the astronauts to finish securing the array structure to the station, photograph the work site, and return to the airlock. The next steps of unfolding the array pair, making electrical connections, and unfurling the rolled arrays were postponed to a future EVA pending ground analysis of the interference issue. CSA astronaut Jenni Sidey was Ground IV.			
240.	Expedition 65; EVA 3	(France) Thomas Pesquet (United States) Shane Kimbrough	20 June 2021; 11:42	20 June 2021; 18:10	6 hours, 28 minutes
240.	Expedition 65; EVA 3	Second in a series of spacewalks that will install the iROSA solar arrays on the P6 Truss. The spacewalkers managed to connect iROSA with a little elbow grease and at 16:40 hours deployed it and it is receiving power. CSA astronaut Jenni Sidey was Ground IV.			
241.	Expedition 65; EVA 4	(France) Thomas Pesquet (United States) Shane Kimbrough	25 June 2021; 11:52	25 June 2021; 18:37	6 hours, 45 minutes
241.	Expedition 65; EVA 4	Third in a series of spacewalks that will install the iROSA solar arrays on the P6 Truss. The spacewalkers completed all the task and at 17:45 hours the arrays were deployed and are generating power. Because of time they did not get to the get ahead task and they will have to be moved to another spacewalk. CSA astronaut Jenni Sidey was Ground IV.			
242.	Expedition 65; EVA 5^	(Russia) Oleg Novitsky (Russia) Pyotr Dubrov	3 September 2021; 14:41	3 September 2021; 22:35	7 hours, 54 minutes
242.	Expedition 65; EVA 5^	First in a series of spacewalks to outfit Nauka. The cosmonauts routed power and Ethernet cables interconnecting Nauka with the US segment via Zarya and PMA-1, and installed EVA handrails along Nauka's exterior. The complex series of tasks planned for this EVA was budgeted at a nominal 7 hours, but was delayed substantially by cumulative minor complications, ultimately stretching to nearly 8 hours with several tasks postponed. The power cables were successfully mated and a good power path was confirmed by ground controllers; the Ethernet cables were routed but not all connections were mated due to lack of time. Mating of the final Ethernet cables and jettisoning of the cable reel were deferred to a future spacewalk. One of the three planned handrail installations was partially completed, but had trouble with one of its screws as the EVA was then past the 7-hour mark, ground controllers instructed Dubrov to attach it temporarily with wire ties for completion on the next EVA. Additional tasks deferred to future EVAs include the installation of three Biorisk microorganism exposure experiment modules on the exterior of the station, and a photo survey of the Zarya module's exterior.			
243.	Expedition 65; EVA 6^	(Russia) Oleg Novitsky (Russia) Pyotr Dubrov	9 September 2021; 14:51	9 September 2021; 22:16	7 hours, 25 minutes
243.	Expedition 65; EVA 6^	Second in a series of spacewalks to outfit Nauka. The cosmonauts continued where they left off from EVA 5, finishing Ethernet cable connections and installing four EVA handrails on Nauka (including the troublesome one left incomplete from EVA 5). They subsequently connected cable bundles between Nauka and Zvezda, providing Ethernet links between those modules as well as links for Nauka's TV cameras and docking navigation antennas (Kurs and TORU). They then mounted three Biorisk microorganism exposure experiment modules on the exterior of the Poisk airlock module. Additionally, the cosmonauts took survey photos of the exterior of the Russian segment of the station, including the Kurs docking antennas of the Progress MS-17 cargo vehicle (confirming that they were undamaged) and external sensors on Nauka; they also realigned a thruster plume measurement unit on Poisk. Finally, the cosmonauts tied together and jettisoned a junk cable reel cover along with some leftover insulation from the Biorisk experiments.			
244.	Expedition 65; EVA 7	(Japan) Akihiko Hoshide (France) Thomas Pesquet	12 September 2021; 12:15	12 September 2021; 19:09	6 hours, 54 minutes
244.	Expedition 65; EVA 7	Installed the 4A modification kit on the P4 Truss for the arrival of SpaceX CRS-26 with the final portside IROSA solar arrays. Replaced a Floating Point Measuring Unit and a Static Charge Micrometer external component on the S1 Truss to prepare the port side for its long term configuration.			
245.	Expedition 66; EVA 1	(United States) Tom Marshburn (United States) Kayla Barron	2 December 2021; 11:15	2 December 2021; 17:47	6 hours, 32 minutes
245.	Expedition 66; EVA 1	Replaced a faulty S-Band Antenna on the P1 Truss that failed last August with a spare mounted nearby on ELC-3.			

== 2022 ==
#	Mission	Spacewalkers	Start (UTC)	End (UTC)	Duration
246.	Expedition 66; EVA 2^	(Russia) Anton Shkaplerov (Russia) Pyotr Dubrov	19 January 2022; 12:17	19 January 2022; 19:28	7 hours, 11 minutes
246.	Expedition 66; EVA 2^	First spacewalk of 2022 to connect the Prichal Node Module to the ISS. Task included relocating the Strela crane over to Nauka so it can be used as a translation path for this spacewalk and the next one 249 or Russian Spacewalk 52, connecting telemetry and power cables, installing handrails, relocating TV cameras and docking antennas, installing docking targets, and jettisoning unneeded hardware and trash.			
247.	Expedition 66; EVA 3	(United States) Kayla Barron (United States) Raja Chari	15 March 2022; 12:12	15 March 2022; 19:06	6 hours, 54 minutes
247.	Expedition 66; EVA 3	First spacewalk to install the IROSA mounting brackets on the S4 Truss. Task included installing the struts, mounting brackets, and triangles at the 3A Array in preparation for the delivery of the IROSA solar arrays on SpaceX CRS-26 in November. The astronauts also tied back insulation on S6 so Dextre can replace the Battery Charge Discharge Modules at this location which have shown signs of decay and will be replaced at a later date. As a get ahead the astronauts photographed a worn keel pin cover which has come loose on one of the pins that were used to secure the airlock in the shuttle bay when it was launched. NASA astronaut Victor Glover was Ground IV.			
248.	Expedition 66; EVA 4	(United States) Raja Chari (Germany) Matthias Maurer	23 March 2022; 12:32	23 March 2022; 19:26	6 hours, 54 minutes
248.	Expedition 66; EVA 4	The astronauts installed ammonia jumpers on the P1 Truss and repositioned a radiator beam valve module which had been giving them trouble returning the unit to operation. The astronauts routed cables, installed cable clamps on the Bartolomeo platform, tied back thermal insulation on the Kibo Exposed Facility Berthing Mechanism, replaced Camera 8 on the truss which has a bad filter and light, outfitted the radiator grapple bars for a future spacewalk, and also did other maintenance task outside the station. Because of time the task to break torque on the P4 electronics boxes was moved to a later spacewalk along with the truss cable routing.			
249.	Expedition 67; EVA 1^	(Russia) Oleg Artemyev (Russia) Denis Matveev	18 April 2022; 13:01	18 April 2022; 21:37	6 hours, 37 minutes
249.	Expedition 67; EVA 1^	Third spacewalk in a series to activate Nauka and Prichal and to commission ERA. During the spacewalk the cosmonauts removed covers and installed electrical cables and an electrical panel to activate ERA at the end of the spacewalk. They also installed handrails, and a payload adapter to allow payloads to be transferred to the Russian Segment.			
250.	Expedition 67; EVA 2^	(Russia) Oleg Artemyev (Russia) Denis Matveev	28 April 2022; 14:58	28 April 2022; 22:40	7 hours, 42 minutes
250.	Expedition 67; EVA 2^	Fourth spacewalk in a series to activate Nauka and Prichal and to commission ERA. During the spacewalk the cosmonauts jettisoned thermal covers, released launch locks, and walked off the arm to its stowage point at worksite 2 on the forward face of the lab where it was latched in place. Because of time they did not release the grapple at worksite 1 and the arm is bent over the solar arrays. The cosmonauts also installed handrails on Nauka and the arm and deployed a banner for Victory Day on the side of the station. ERA was checked out inside and attempts to grapple at worksite 3 were unsuccessful. The arm was backed off and parked to get the hands out of the way of docked operations and Nauka's thrusters and solar arrays. On the next spacewalk, Samantha Cristoforetti will troubleshoot the arm before it is re-grappled to worksite 3 and moved to its final location at worksite 4. During the spacewalk, a cable which was deployed during Russian EVA 51 back in January got snagged and caused issues with the KURS antennas on Prichal, which forced Soyuz MS-21 to be flown in manually. Artemyev tied down the cables with wire ties and the antenna was redeployed into a safe configuration.			
251.	Expedition 67; EVA 3^	(Russia) Oleg Artemyev (Italy) Samantha Cristoforetti	21 July 2022; 14:50	21 July 2022; 21:55	7 hours, 5 minutes
251.	Expedition 67; EVA 3^	Fifth spacewalk in a series to outfit Nauka and to commission ERA. Russian cosmonaut Oleg Artemyev and Italian astronaut Samantha Cristoforetti worked on the ERA robotic arm as part of the work scheduled to commission the Nauka module and robotic arm. They launched two Tsiolkovsky-Ryazan (No. 1-2) and eight YUZGU-55 (No. 5-12) satellites, installed an ERA grapple point on Poisk to facilitate future relocation of the experiment airlock on the next spacewalk, translated a work platform over to Nauka, reconfigured ERA and set the control panel from "grapple mode" to "stowed", replaced a camera port window on ERA that prevented grappling on the previous spacewalk, replaced MLI blankets on Nauka that were knocked loose by the thruster firings when the module arrived, and installed retainers on Strela 1 on Poisk. The final task to relocate Strela 2 on Zarya over to Poisk and install its retainer was deferred to the next EVA as the spacewalkers were running heavily behind schedule due to a later-than-planned start. Cristoforetti became the first female European astronaut to perform a spacewalk, and only the third woman to perform a spacewalk using the Russian Orlan spacesuit (after Svetlana Savitskaya and Peggy Whitson).			
252.	Expedition 67; EVA 4^	(Russia) Oleg Artemyev (Russia) Denis Matveev	17 August 2022; 13:53	17 August 2022; 17:54	4 hours, 1 minute
252.	Expedition 67; EVA 4^	Sixth spacewalk in a series to outfit Nauka and to prepare the Russian Segment for module transfers which will take place in the fall. The primary task to install cameras on the elbow joint was completed on time and both cameras passed their telemetry checkouts. The final tasks to relocate the ERA control panel, set the arm back to "grapple mode", and remove the launch rings from the wrist of ERA will be moved to the next spacewalk. Artemyev was in the process of removing the launch ring at worksite 2 from ERA when he suffered a voltage drop in his spacesuit batteries. Mission Control Moscow ordered him back inside the airlock where he connected to internal power to recharge his suit. Because they were ahead and then behind the timeline, in light of the battery issue Mission Control Moscow gave the order to terminate the EVA at 16:34 GMT and the spacewalk concluded at 17:54 GMT, 4 hours and 1 minute into the spacewalk. Artemyev was never in any danger and they will be replacing the battery before the next spacewalk. Because of the early EVA termination, the getahead task to relocate Strela 2 over to Poisk was also moved to the next spacewalk along with the other tasks.			
253.	Expedition 67; EVA 5^	(Russia) Oleg Artemyev (Russia) Denis Matveev	2 September 2022; 13:25	2 September 2022; 21:12	7 hours, 47 minutes
253.	Expedition 67; EVA 5^	Seventh in a series of spacewalks to outfit Nauka and to prepare ERA for operations. The spacewalkers completed the task that were moved from the previous two spacewalks. They installed the ERA control panel at a new basepoint, removed launch rings and covers from ERA, returned the arm to "grapple mode", performed test on ERA, and installed two payload adapters on Nauka. As a getahead task they relocated Strela 2 over to Poisk and installed a retainer. Because of time and the lack of consumables the task to break torque on bolts that secure the airlock and the radiator to Rassvet was deferred to the next spacewalk. This was the longest EVA of Expedition 67 and the final one of this mission.			
254.	Expedition 68; EVA 1	(United States) Josh Cassada (United States) Frank Rubio	15 November 2022; 14:14	15 November 2022; 21:25	7 hours, 11 minutes
254.	Expedition 68; EVA 1	Cassada and Rubio installed the final IROSA mounting bracket on the S6 Truss at Array 1B. As part of get-ahead tasks, they prepared the 3A mounting bracket at S4 for the delivery of 2 IROSAs on the 18th and routed cables along the truss to be mated at the end of EVA 3. Because of time they did not install the slip collars on S6 and the cable routing was partly completed. The S6 cables will be routed on a later spacewalk when IROSA arrives. NASA astronaut Zena Cardman and JAXA astronaut Akihiko Hoshide was Ground IV Capcom.			
255.	Expedition 68; EVA 2^	(Russia) Sergey Prokopyev (Russia) Dmitry Petelin	17 November 2022; 14:39	17 November 2022; 21:07	6 hours, 25 minutes
255.	Expedition 68; EVA 2^	Eighth in a series of spacewalks to outfit Nauka and to prepare ERA for operations. The spacewalkers changed a grapple fixture so the airlock can be used as a base point for the arm, broke torque on bolts that secure the airlock and radiator to Rassvet, removed launch restraints from the radiator, vented nitrogen jumpers, replaced a retainer on Strela 2 with one that has a stop, and transferred a MLM outfitting work platform called the SKKO that is, the Nauka Means of attachment of large payloads over to Nauka and installed it at the ERA base point facing aft where ERA used to be, when it was launched.			
256.	Expedition 68; EVA 3	(United States) Josh Cassada (United States) Frank Rubio	3 December 2022; 12:16	3 December 2022; 19:21	7 hours, 5 minutes
256.	Expedition 68; EVA 3	Assisted by Canadarm2, Cassada and Rubio installed an IROSA at Array 3A and connected it to the US power system. The spacewalkers undid bolts and installed cables and at 17:37 GMT the array was deployed and is receiving power. As part of get-ahead tasks, they prepared the 4A array for the next spacewalk, demated a cable to a failed portion of the 1B array, broke torque on the P4 electronic boxes, and installed cables along the truss to be mated at the end of EVA 4. Spacewalk faced a delay when Cassada's suit did not power up. Troubleshooting steps were done and power was restored to Cassada's suit so they could continue the spacewalk. NASA astronaut Nick Hague was ground IV.			
257.	Expedition 68; EVA 4	(United States) Frank Rubio (United States) Josh Cassada	22 December 2022; 13:19	22 December 2022 20:27	7 hours, 8 minutes
257.	Expedition 68; EVA 4	Assisted by Canadarm2, Rubio and Cassada installed the fourth IROSA at Array 4A and connected it to the US power system. Task included releasing bolts, installing cables, and deploying the array and connecting it to the US power system. The array was deployed at 18:25 GMT and is receiving power. Rubio and Cassada then stowed the array stowage beams on the carrier and removed their foot restraints from the arm while astronaut Nicole Mann grappled to the carrier and load it into the trunk of SpaceX CRS-26 for disposal at the end of the spacewalk. As a get-ahead they photographed Soyuz MS-22 which has suffered a cooling leak in its primary radiator and the Rocky Mountains as the station passed over Idaho during the deployment. NASA astronaut Nick Hague was ground IV. This was the final spacewalk of 2022 because the final Russian spacewalks got canceled following a cooling leak on the Russian segment.			

== 2023 ==
#	Mission	Spacewalkers	Ground IV Astronaut	Start (UTC)	End (UTC)	Duration
258.	Expedition 68; EVA 5	(Japan) Koichi Wakata (United States) Nicole Mann	(United States) Zena Cardman (Japan) Akihiko Hoshide	20 January 2023; 13:14	20 January 2023; 20:35	7 hours, 21 minutes
258.	Expedition 68; EVA 5	First spacewalk of 2023 to finish installation of the IROSA mounting brackets on the starboard side of the station. Wakata and Mann installed cables on the 1B Array at the S6 truss, which was not completed on the last spacewalk, tightened bolts and installed a terminator on a cable along with its connected jumper on the SSDCDC converter box to isolate the 1B array until the IROSA solar arrays are installed following the arrival of SpaceX CRS-28 in June. They also assembled and installed the IROSA mounting bracket onto the 1A array, which was also left incomplete on the last spacewalk. Wakata and Mann were unable to secure the final strut on the 1A solar array because of debris in the guide track of the mounting pad and only one of the jumpers was installed. The astronauts returned the strut to the Quest Airlock and will use special tools to clean the tracks before it is remounted on the next spacewalk. They were also unable to connect the cables for 1A due to time constraints.				
259.	Expedition 68; EVA 6	(United States) Nicole Mann (Japan) Koichi Wakata	(United States) Zena Cardman	2 February 2023; 12:45	2 February 2023; 19:26	6 hours, 41 minutes
259.	Expedition 68; EVA 6	Final spacewalk to install the mounting brackets for the 1A solar array in preparation for the delivery of IROSA on SpaceX CRS-28. Tasks performed by Mann and Wakata included installing the final strut, securing the bolts on the 1A solar array, relocating foot restraints that were left on P6 inboard, and routing cables. This was the final spacewalk of the expedition due to the Soyuz MS-22 cooling loop accident, which resulted in all Russian spacewalks being cancelled.				
260.	Expedition 69; EVA 1^	(Russia) Sergey Prokopyev (Russia) Dmitry Petelin		19 April 2023; 01:40	19 April 2023; 09:35	7 hours, 55 minutes
260.	Expedition 69; EVA 1^	Ninth in a series of spacewalks to outfit Nauka and to prepare ERA for operations. The spacewalkers used ERA to pick up the radiator with the arm and relocated it to Nauka at the end of the spacewalk. The spacewalkers closed valves on the nitrogen jumpers, removed covers over the nitrogen jumpers, disconnected the radiator heater cable and capped it, removed bolts and launch restraints, and transferred the radiator over to Nauka and installed it into a socket on the forward face where it will be deployed at the end of EVA 4. As part of get-ahead tasks, the spacewalkers prepared the airlock for transfer to Nauka on the next spacewalk and stowed the ERA adapter on the airlock. Because of time and issues with matting the radiator the task to jettison the covers was moved to the next spacewalk. This was the longest spacewalk of this expedition and a critical one to get the lab activated.				
261.	Expedition 69; EVA 2	(United States) Stephen Bowen (United Arab Emirates) Sultan Al Neyadi	(United States) Anne McClain	28 April 2023; 13:11	28 April 2023; 20:12	7 hours, 1 minute
261.	Expedition 69; EVA 2	Bowen and Al Neyadi, who became the first Arab astronaut to perform a spacewalk, finished routing cables and secured the struts with MLI at the 1B and 1A solar arrays in preparation for the arrival of the IROSA arrays in June. The primary task to retrieve the Space to Ground Antenna (SASA) was deferred to the next spacewalk because a stuck bolt on the electronics box prevented the antenna from being released from the FRAM. NASA Astronaut Anne McClain was Ground IV CAPCOM.				
262.	Expedition 69; EVA 3^	(Russia) Sergey Prokopyev (Russia) Dmitry Petelin		3 May 2023; 20:00	4 May 2023; 03:11	7 hours, 11 minutes
262.	Expedition 69; EVA 3^	Tenth in a series of spacewalks to outfit Nauka and to prepare ERA for operations. Prokopyev and Petelin removed bolts and covers, disconnected cables, and used ERA to transfer the airlock over to Nauka, where it was installed on the forward facing port. Once the airlock was installed, they mated cables and jettisoned their trash, which included hardware and covers from the previous spacewalks and this spacewalk. The spacewalk faced a delay when ERA entered an uncontrolled roll, placing the airlock out of alignment. Prokopyev and Petelin improvised with a little elbow grease, rotated the airlock into the correct position, and got it latched in place. The spacewalk faced another delay when tape was found on the electrical connectors, requiring Prokopyev to cut it before the cables were connected.				
263.	Expedition 69; EVA 4^	(Russia) Sergey Prokopyev (Russia) Dmitry Petelin		12 May 2023; 15:47	12 May 2023; 23:01	5 hours, 14 minutes
263.	Expedition 69; EVA 4^	Eleventh spacewalk to outfit Nauka and to prepare ERA for operations. To wrap up work on Nauka, the cosmonauts deployed the radiator, and installed nitrogen and ammonia jumpers to cool the Russian Segment and connected the radiator to electrical power, hydraulics, and mechanical connections. As a getahead task while the radiator was being filled with coolant the cosmonauts installed gap spanners on ERA's boom and handrails on Prichal to allow for translation on future spacewalks.				
264.	Expedition 69; EVA 5	(United States) Stephen Bowen (United States) Woody Hoburg	(Canada) Jenni Sidey-Gibbons	9 June 2023; 13:15	9 June 2023; 19:18	6 hours, 3 minutes
264.	Expedition 69; EVA 5	NASA astronauts Steve Bowen and Woody Hoburg exited the station's Quest airlock and installed an upgraded IROSA (International Space Station Roll-Out Solar Array) on the 1A power channel on the starboard truss of the station. Task included removing bolts, deploying the rollers, and installing cables before the solar array was picked up by Hoburg with assistance from Canadarm 2 and installed on the 1A solar array on the S4 Truss. The array was deployed at 16:32 hours and is receiving power.				
265.	Expedition 69; EVA 6	(United States) Stephen Bowen (United States) Woody Hoburg	(Canada) Jenni Sidey-Gibbons	15 June 2023; 12:42	15 June 2023; 18:17	5 hours, 35 minutes
265.	Expedition 69; EVA 6	NASA astronauts Steve Bowen and Woody Hoburg exited the station's Quest airlock to install the final upgraded IROSA (International Space Station Roll-Out Solar Array) on the 1B power channel on the starboard truss of the station. Task included removing bolts, deploying the rollers, and installing cables before the solar array was picked up by Hoburg with assistance from Canadarm 2 and installed on the 1B solar array on the S6 Truss. The array was deployed at 16:51 hours and is receiving power. As part of getahead task they covered the cables in MLI and secured the struts, relocated their foot restraints inboard, and stowed the support beams on the flight support structure for disposal.				
266.	Expedition 69; EVA 7^	(Russia) Sergey Prokopyev (Russia) Dmitry Petelin		22 June 2023; 14:24	22 June 2023; 20:48	6 hours, 24 minutes
266.	Expedition 69; EVA 7^	Prokopyev and Petelin exited the Poisk airlock and routed an Ethernet cable to the port experiment frame on the Zvezda Service Module, jettisoned experiment hardware including the TMTC Monoblock antennas, the highspeed data transmission antenna, and the Seismo Prognos payload, installed a data transmission radio onto the port frame, removed experiments from the Zvezda Service Module, photographed Zvezda including the thrusters so they can patch the leak, inspected an antenna, and retrieved the Biorisk containers. As a getahead they cleaned the windows on the Russian segment, reposition the Plume Measurement Unit, and jettisoned a towel.				
267.	Expedition 69; EVA 8^	(Russia) Sergey Prokopyev (Russia) Dmitry Petelin		9 August 2023; 14:44	9 August 2023; 21:19	6 hours, 35 minutes
267.	Expedition 69; EVA 8^	Twelfth and final spacewalk to outfit Nauka and to prepare ERA for operations. Both cosmonauts ventured outside the station's Poisk Airlock to attach three debris shields to the Rassvet module. They also tested the sturdiness of the last MLM outfitting called the ERA portable workpost, that will be affixed to the end of the European robotic arm attached to the Nauka multipurpose laboratory module.				
268.	Expedition 70; EVA 1^	(Russia) Oleg Kononenko (Russia) Nikolai Chub		25 October 2023; 17:49	26 October 2023; 01:30	7 hours, 41 minutes
268.	Expedition 70; EVA 1^	The cosmonauts ventured outside and installed a mini radar experiment on Nauka, launched a CubeSat which will test solar sails, and photographed the RTOd radiator and closed valves to isolate the radiator and vented residual coolant so plans can be done to fix a leaking cooling line that delayed two US spacewalks. During one of the vents, Kononenko got sprayed and the coolant got on one of his tethers. The tether was placed in a trash bag and stowed externally to decontaminate it, while Kononenko's suit was wiped down to prevent coolant from entering the station. During the radar deployment, one of the hinges got stuck. The cosmonauts will go out on the next spacewalk and will use special tools and lock the hinges so it can be deployed. During the satellite deployment, the telescoping booms did not come out and ground controllers are working to manually deploy them so the satellite can track the sun.				
269.	Expedition 70; EVA 2	(United States) Jasmin Moghbeli (United States) Loral O'Hara	(United States) Anne McClain	1 November 2023; 12:05	1 November 2023; 18:47	6 hours, 42 minutes
269.	Expedition 70; EVA 2	Moghbeli and O'Hara ventured outside and removed an H fixture from the 3B mass canister on the S4 truss in preparation for the arrival of the struts and the IROSA solar arrays in 2025. They also replaced a damaged Trundle Bearing under Cover 2 which had been giving them trouble in the past and greased the tracks before the new Trundle Bearing was installed on the port SARJ, secured a cable on Camera 8 which was shorting out a light used for dockings, and released wedge clamps on the SASA antenna. The primary task to retrieve the SASA antenna from ESP2 so it can be returned to Earth on SpaceX CRS-29 was moved to the next spacewalk because of issues removing the covers from the SARJ. O'Hara was not secured properly during the removal and had to be assisted by Moghbeli to get the cover stowed. During the spacewalk, the bag containing the grease gun was lost, but the tools were not needed and the bag posed no collision risk to the station. This was the fourth all-female spacewalk on the station, following Christina Koch and Jessica Meir's three spacewalks during Expedition 61.				

== 2024 ==
#	Mission	Spacewalkers	Start (UTC)	End (UTC)	Duration
270.	Expedition 71; EVA 1^	(Russia) Oleg Kononenko (Russia) Nikolai Chub	25 April 2024; 14:57	25 April 2024; 19:33	4 hours, 36 minutes
270.	Expedition 71; EVA 1^	Kononenko and Chub ventured out and released launch locks on the Mini Radar Unit to get it deployed and installed a series of experiments TKK and Kvartz onto Poisk including a monoblock payload adapter and boom and photographed the Russian Segment. The cosmonauts also repositioned the Plume Measurement Unit, removed an ion radiation probe and stowed it for jettisoned, and retrieved the Biorisk canisters for return to Earth. The cosmonauts also wiped down the handrails on Nauka and Poisk to check for microbial growth and contamination from the radiator leak and from visiting vehicles and hydrazine from Nauka's arrival.			
271.	Expedition 71; EVA 2	(United States) Tracy Caldwell Dyson (United States) Michael Barratt	24 June 2024; 12:46	24 June 2024; 13:17	31 minutes
271.	Expedition 71; EVA 2	Dyson and Barratt were intended to venture out and retrieve the SASA Antenna and bring it inside, collect samples from the station's hull to look for signs of microbial growth that could be present on the modules either after launch or exposed to space, and prep the LEE A Wrist Joint Replacement Module for installation on an upcoming spacewalk. However, the spacewalk was terminated shortly after depress due to a water leak in the service and cooling umbilical unit on Dyson's spacesuit.			
272.	Expedition 72; EVA 1^	(Russia) Aleksey Ovchinin (Russia) Ivan Vagner	19 December 2024; 15:36	19 December 2024; 22:53	7 hours, 17 minutes
272.	Expedition 72; EVA 1^	The cosmonauts ventured outside and installed an x-ray telescope on plain 5 of the Zvezda Service Module, jettisoned an ion radiation probe, retrieved Biorisk, TEST, and two exposure experiments on Zvezda and Poisk, and rewired Zvezda and replaced two patch panels which were showing signs of degraded insulation, electronics, and frayed wiring. The task to relocate the ERA control panel was moved to another spacewalk because of time and because of a late start.			

== 2025 ==
#	Mission	Spacewalkers	Ground IV Astronaut	Start (UTC)	End (UTC)	Duration
273.	Expedition 72; EVA 2	(United States) Nick Hague (United States) Suni Williams	(Japan) Aki Hoshide (United States) Jessica Wittner	16 January 2025; 13:01	16 January 2025; 19:01	6 hours
273.	Expedition 72; EVA 2	Hague and Williams ventured outside and replaced the Rate Gyro Assembly Gyroscope 2 on the S0 Truss, replaced the retro reflectors on IDA 3, installed shields on NICER to patch holes in the light shades, relocated the C2V2 cables out of the way so the astronauts and Canadarm 2 could access the worksite, tested a tool on the AMS jumpers, and photographed the AMS jumpers so they can be de-mated on a future spacewalk. As part of a get-ahead task, they inspected an ammonia vent line on Unity and inspected a foot restraint located near the Z1 Radio Antenna. This spacewalk was originally supposed to be performed by Andreas Mogensen and Loral O'Hara during Expedition 70, but it was delayed indefinitely due to a radiator leak on Nauka.				
274.	Expedition 72; EVA 3	(United States) Suni Williams (United States) Butch Wilmore	(United States) Steve Bowen (United States) Will Vu	30 January 2025; 13:43	30 January 2025; 19:09	5 hours, 26 minutes
274.	Expedition 72; EVA 3	Williams and Wilmore ventured out, retrieved the SASA Antenna and brought it back inside whilst also collecting samples from the station's hull to look for signs of microbial growth that could be present on the modules either after launch or being exposed to space. The spacewalk faced a delay when the jacking bolts broke, requiring Williams and Wilmore to use some elbow grease to get the antenna to release. The secondary task to prep the LEE-A Wrist Joint Replacement Module for installation on an upcoming spacewalk, and stage the IROSA Cable Bag outside the airlock so they are ready for a future spacewalk, was moved to the next spacewalk since it is not critical. As a get-ahead task, Wilmore stowed some tethers and the crowbars he used inside a locker outside the airlock to be used on a future spacewalk.				
275.	Expedition 73; EVA 1	(United States) Anne McClain (United States) Nichole Ayers	(United States) Marcos Berríos (United States) Sandy Moore	1 May 2025; 13:05	1 May 2025; 18:49	5 hours, 44 minutes
275.	Expedition 73; EVA 1	McClain and Ayers ventured outside and installed a mounting bracket for a future Roll Out Solar Array onto the P4 truss 2A mass canister, relocated a communications antenna used to communicate with spacecraft during arrivals and departures, installed a jumper cable to provide power from the P6 truss to the Russian Orbital Segment, and removed bolts from a micrometeoroid cover. They were unable to install the telescoping booms for the two side struts because of time and debris in the track, and these will be installed on the next spacewalk with special tools. This was the fifth all-female spacewalk on the station, following Christina Koch and Jessica Meir's three EVAs during Expedition 61 and Jasmin Moghbeli and Loral O'Hara's EVA during Expedition 70.				
276.	Expedition 73; EVA 2^	(Russia) Sergey Ryzhikov (Russia) Alexey Zubritsky		16 October 2025; 17:10	16 October 2025; 23:19	6 hours, 9 minutes
276.	Expedition 73; EVA 2^	Ryzhikov and Zubritsky ventured out and installed the Ekran-M payload onto the Nauka Module frame, jettisoned the High Resolution Camera and a mounting platform, and cleaned the windows on the Zvezda Service Module. As a get ahead task, they removed SKK panel 3 and Biorisk container 2 and brought them inside.				
277.	Expedition 73; EVA 3^	(Russia) Sergey Ryzhikov (Russia) Alexey Zubritsky		28 October 2025; 14:18	28 October 2025; 21:12	6 hours, 54 minutes
277.	Expedition 73; EVA 3^	Ryzhikov and Zubritsky ventured out and installed the IPI plasma injector onto the Nauka Module, relocated the ERA control panel, cleaned the Nauka science window, and replaced a cassette in the Ekran-M payload, which was installed on the last spacewalk. The original task to jettison some hardware on the Zvezda Service Module and some window cleaning equipment will be moved to the next spacewalk to prevent debris strikes on the HTV-X, which is on final approach.				

== 2026 ==
#	Mission	Spacewalkers	Ground IV Astronaut	Start (UTC)	End (UTC)	Duration
278.	Expedition 74; EVA 1	(United States) Jessica Meir (United States) Christopher Williams	(United States) Tracy Dyson (United States) Scott Segadi	March 18, 2026; 12:52	March 18, 2026; 19:54	7 hours, 2 minutes
278.	Expedition 74; EVA 1	Meir and Williams ventured out and prepared the 2A power channel for future installation of the iROSA to provide additional power, broke torque on batteries and the DDCU, routed cables, and inspected the port SARJ in preparation for a second trundle bearing replacement on a later spacewalk. The getahead task of installing a lenses cover on Canadarm 2 and swabbing the hull near the Airlock, their gloves, and the Destiny Lab for microbes was moved to a later spacewalk because of time to troubleshoot some stubborn bolts on the iROSA kit and to mate some electrical caps on the P3 Truss. It was originally scheduled to be performed by Zena Cardman and Michael Fincke on January 8, but it was cancelled due to a crewmember "medical situation", along with another spacewalk on January 15, during which two crew members were planned to replace a high-definition camera, install a new navigational aid for visiting spacecraft on the Harmony module’s forward port, and relocate an early ammonia servicer jumper, a flexible hose assembly that connects parts of a fluid system, along with other jumpers on the station’s S6 and S4 truss.				
279.	Expedition 74; EVA 2^	(Russia) Sergey Kud-Sverchkov (Russia) Sergey Mikayev		May 27, 2026; 14:18	May 27, 2026; 20:23	6 hours, 5 minutes
279.	Expedition 74; EVA 2^	Kud-Sverchkov and Mikayev ventured out and installed Solntse-Teragerts, which is a solar radiation experiment on the Zvezda Service Module, removed and replaced a cassette in the Ekran-M payload on the Nauka Module, removed Biorisk from Poisk, and photographed one of the Progress 94 cargo spacecraft’s Kurs rendezvous antennas that failed to deploy in March following its launch to the space station and secured it with wire ties.				
280.	Expedition 74; EVA 3	(United States) Christopher Williams (United States) Jessica Meir	(Japan) Aki Hoshide (Canada) Jenni Sidey-Gibbons	June 30, 2026; 12:20	June 30, 2026; 19:40	7 hours, 20 minutes
280.	Expedition 74; EVA 3	Williams and Meir ventured out, released the wrist joint replacement module on ESP2, and swapped it for a degraded one, which was brought in at the end of the spacewalk to return Canadarm2 to operations.				
281.	Expedition 75; EVA 1	(United States) Jessica Meir (United States) Anil Menon	(Japan) Aki Hoshide (United States) Stephanie Wilson	August 6, 2026; 12:33	August 6, 2026; 19:00	6 hours, 27 minutes
281.	Expedition 75; EVA 1	Meir and Menon ventured out and prepared the station’s 3B power channel for a future iROSA installation. With the modification kit installed, Menon broke torque on batteries and the DDCU, while Meir routed cables and set out foot restraints and gap spanners for EVA 4. Because of time the task to prep, the pump module was moved to a future spacewalk.				
282.	Expedition 75; EVA 2	(United States) Anil Menon (France) Sophie Adenot	(United States) Steven Zentner (United States) Anne McClain	August 18, 2026; 12:29	August 18, 2026; 18:52	6 hours, 23 minutes
282.	Expedition 75; EVA 2	Menon and Adenot ventured out and removed a failed space-to-ground antenna. The spacewalk faced delays with the crew taking too long to install clamps, shields, and restraints on the antenna and release the bolts securing it to the top of the Z1 Antenna Complex. As they cleaned up, they removed a foot restraint near the Quest Airlock and brought it inside, so its heat shield and socket can be replaced and sent back out on the next spacewalk. Adenot became the first female French astronaut to perform an EVA and the second female European astronaut to do so after Samantha Cristoforetti in 2022 during Expedition 67.				
283.	Expedition 75; EVA 3	(United States) Anil Menon (France) Sophie Adenot	(United States) Steven Zentner (United States) Anne McClain	August 25, 2026; 12:27	August 25, 2026; 18:57	6 hours, 30 minutes
283.	Expedition 75; EVA 3	Menon and Adenot ventured out and installed an onboard spare space-to-ground antenna. The get ahead task to replace the retroreflector on the Harmony module was moved to the next spacewalk because of time and Adenot and Menon having to resort to using a torque wrench to secure bolts on the antenna and stow the degraded one back on ESP 3.				
284.	Expedition 75; EVA 4	(France) Sophie Adenot (United States) Jessica Meir	(United States) Tess Caswell (United States) Mark Vande Hei	September 1, 2026; 12:40	September 1, 2026; 19:29	6 hours, 49 minutes
284.	Expedition 75; EVA 4	Adenot and Meir ventured out and replaced a retroreflector on the forward docking port of the Harmony module used to improve navigation data for visiting spacecraft, routed cables for future modules and ammonia and nitrogen jumpers for a radiator, filled on the starboard truss, changed out camera three, tightened bolts on the Alpha Magnetic Spectrometer, and prepared the ISS for its eventual decommissioning. During the spacewalk, Adenot experienced joint lock with her suit, and they only got one of the cables plugged in and released half of the bolts on the Alpha Magnetic Spectrometer. Meir later determined that this was an issue with the joint heater inside Adenot's suit getting snagged. Before getting in the airlock, Meir managed to restore mobility to Adenot's suit by opening a zipper. The glove will later be returned to Earth on the next SpaceX mission for evaluation. This was the sixth all-female spacewalk on the station, following Meir and Christina Koch's three EVAs during Expedition 61, Jasmin Moghbeli and Loral O'Hara's EVA during Expedition 70, and Anne McClain and Nichole Ayers' EVA during Expedition 73. It was also the first all-female spacewalk to involve an astronaut from an agency other than NASA.				
285.	Expedition 75; EVA 5	(United States) Anil Menon (Canada) Joshua Kutryk	(United States) Nichole Ayers (Canada) Jenni Sidey-Gibbons	October 29, 2026; 11:57	October 29, 2026; 19:08	7 hours, 11 minutes
285.	Expedition 75; EVA 5	Menon and Kutryk installed the first set of iROSA solar arrays onto the 2A power channel and prepared the ridged array carrier for the next spacewalk.				
286.	Expedition 75; EVA 6	(Canada) Joshua Kutryk (United States) Anil Menon	(United States) Nichole Ayers (Canada) Jenni Sidey-Gibbons	November 5, 2026; 13:36	November 5, 2026; 20:35	6 hours, 59 minutes
286.	Expedition 75; EVA 6	Kutryk and Menon installed the final set of iROSA solar arrays onto the 3B power channel and prepared the ridged array carrier for disposal at the end of the spacewalk.				

*denotes spacewalks performed from the Pirs docking compartment in Russian Orlan suits.
^denotes spacewalks performed from the Poisk module in Russian Orlan suits.
†denotes spacewalks performed from the visiting space shuttle's airlock.
‡denotes the one EVA and one IVA performed from the transfer compartment at the forward end of the Zvezda Service Module.
All other spacewalks were performed from the Quest airlock.
ISS Expedition spacewalks are separated from shuttle spacewalks by a separator.

== Gallery ==
A photograph of a long, white mechanical arm stretching out above a mostly blue planet displaying white clouds and brown terrain all under a black expanse	A photograph of a person in a white suit with a rectangular blue patch with a yellow cross on it on his left shoulder all in front of a blue-and-white background	A photograph of a man in a white suit looking at the viewer and waving with his right hand while gripping a brown bar with his left hand	A photograph of a man in a white suit attached to a silver mechanical object by way of a cord labelled "2.8" in black letters on a white tag
Stephen Robinson participates in the third spacewalk during STS-114.	European Space Agency astronaut Christer Fuglesang participates in the second spacewalk of STS-116.	Steven Swanson waves to Patrick G. Forrester during the third EVA of STS-117.	Robert L. Behnken on the third spacewalk of STS-123.

== See also ==
- List of spacewalks and moonwalks
- List of cumulative spacewalk records
