= Sergey Korsakov =

Sergey Korsakov may refer to:

- Sergei Korsakoff (1854–1900), Russian neuropsychiatrist
- Sergey Korsakov (cosmonaut) (born 1984), Russian cosmonaut
