= Total Dictation =

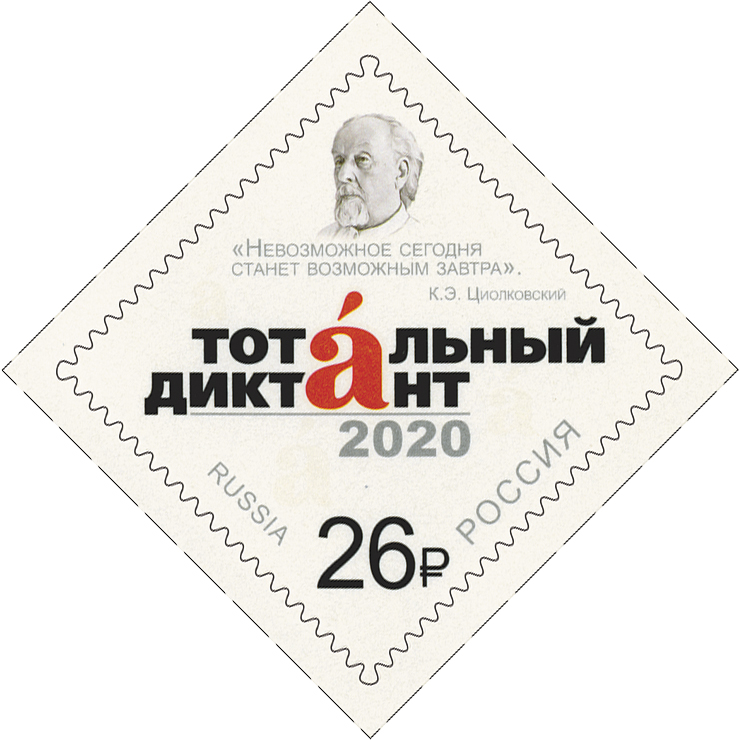
Postage stamp dedicated to the Total Dictation, with a portrait of Konstantin Tsiolkovsky and his quote.

Total Dictation (Russian: Тотальный диктант) is an annual educational event that has been held in Russia and other countries to popularize literacy. It originated at the Novosibirsk State University in 2004.

== History ==
The first Total Dictation was held at the student Glum Club of the Humanities Faculty of Novosibirsk State University. In 2011, Dmitry Bykov became the author of the text for the Total Dictation, and the event became popular not only in Novosibirsk, but also in other parts of Russia and even in the United States.

In 2014, Total Dictation was held on six continents, in 47 countries. The northernmost point of the dictation was Dixon on Taimyr, and the southernmost was the Vostok Station. The most western point was San Jose (California, USA), and the most eastern place was Auckland (New Zealand). The event was attended by cosmonaut Oleg Artemyev from the International Space Station. Bishkek, Tallinn, Pavlodar and Riga became the leaders in terms of the number of participants among foreign cities. Vasily Avchenko wrote the text for the 2023 event.
