= MS 18 =

MS 18 may refer to:

- Mara 18, a Central American gang
- Mississippi Highway 18
- Soyuz MS-18
