= Denis Matveev =

Russian cosmonaut (born 1983)

- Денис Матвеев
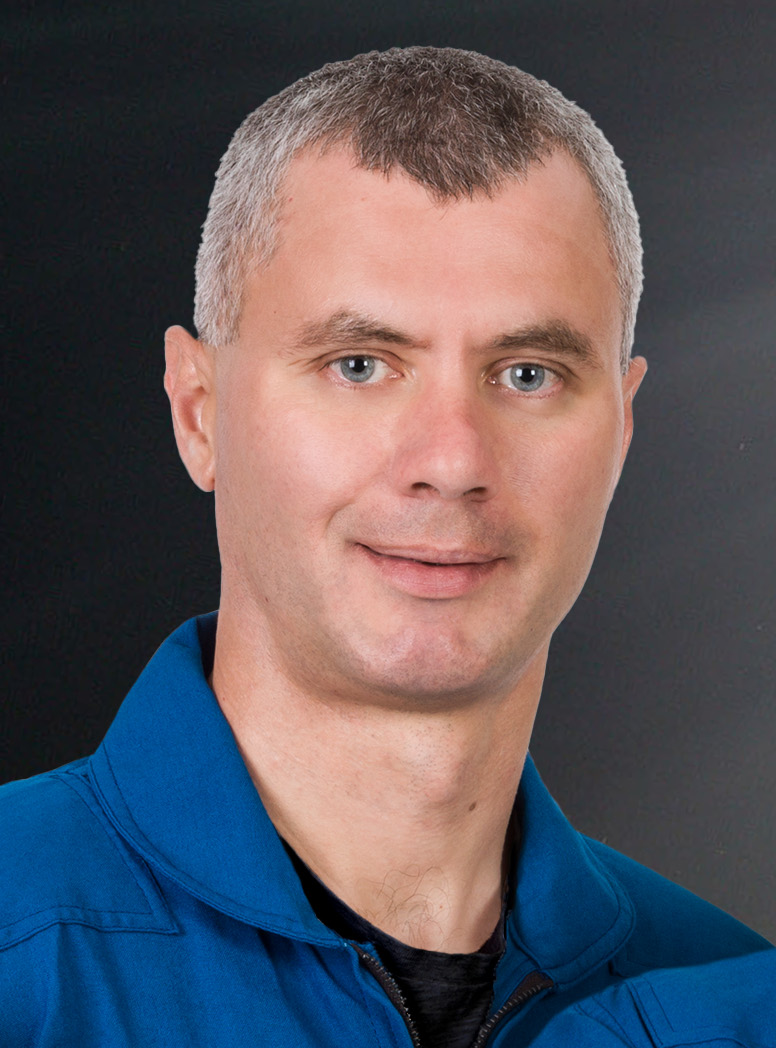
- Matveev in 2021
- Born: Denis Vladimirovich Matveev; 25 April 1983 (age 43); Leningrad, Russian SFSR, Soviet Union
- Education: Bauman Moscow State Technical University
- Awards: Hero of the Russian Federation; Pilot-Cosmonaut of the Russian Federation
- Space career

Roscosmos cosmonaut
- Previous occupation: Engineer
- Status: Retired
- Rank: Senior lieutenant (reserve)
- Time in space: 194 days, 19 hours, 1 minute
- Selection: TsPK-15 Cosmonaut Group (2010)
- Total EVAs: 4
- Total EVA time: 26 hours, 7 minutes
- Missions: Soyuz MS-21 (Expedition 66/67)
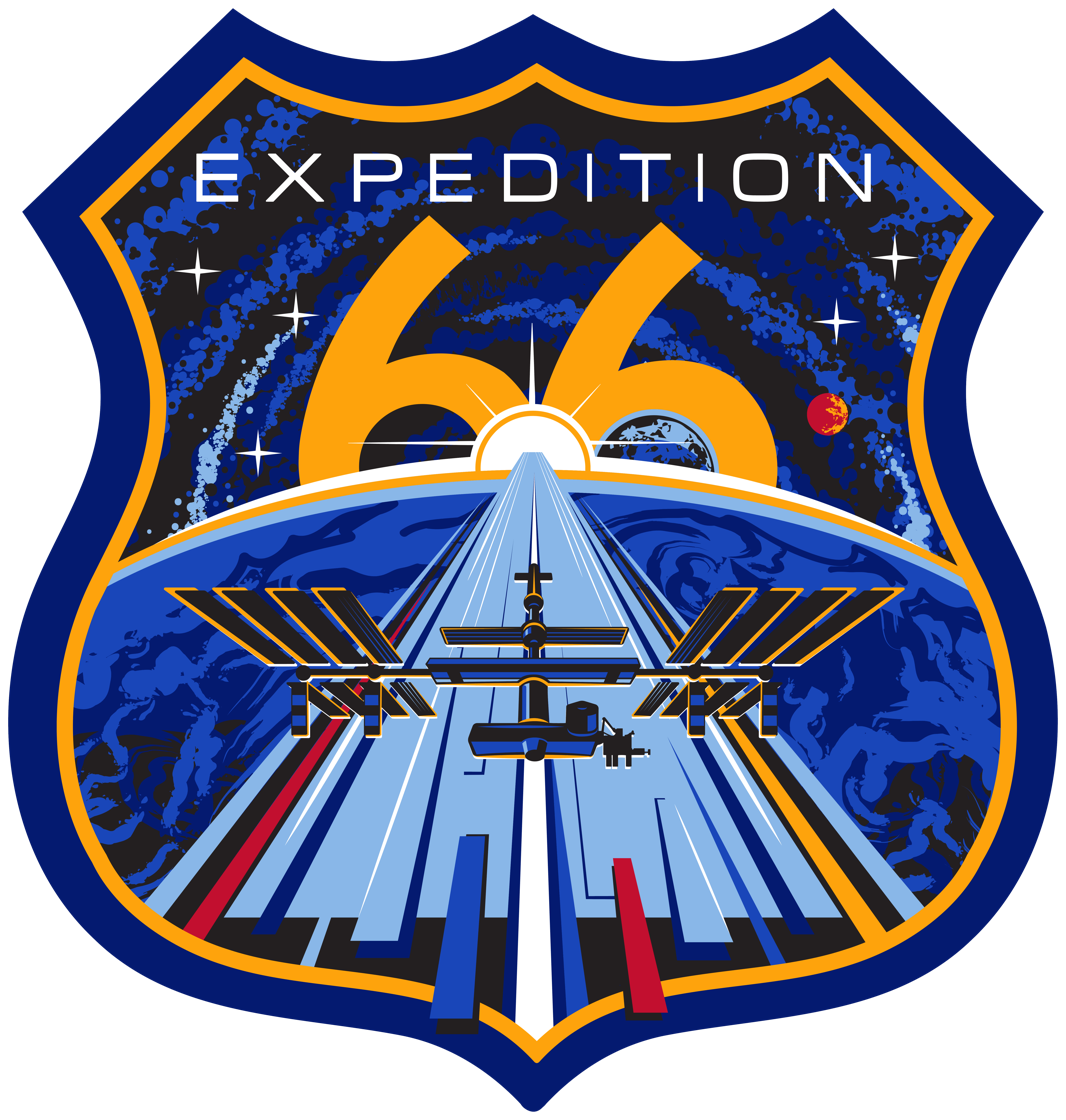
- Mission insignia
- Retired: 29 July 2024

Denis Vladimirovich Matveev (Russian Cyrillic: Денис Владимирович Матвеев; born 25 April 1983 in Leningrad, RSFSR, now St. Petersburg, Russia) is a former Russian cosmonaut.

== Biography ==
Matveev received his degree in computing and networks from the Bauman Moscow State Technical University in 2006. After graduation, Matveev began working at the Yuri Gagarin Cosmonaut Training Center in Star City, Russia as a junior research assistant. He was promoted to engineer in 2009.

Matveev was selected as a cosmonaut in 2010. He was appointed to begin training on 12 October 2010, and was named a test cosmonaut on 31 July 2012.

The Russian magazine Cosmonautics News reported that Matveev had been selected as a flight engineer for the Soyuz MS-06 spaceflight to the International Space Station; however, he did not launch on this mission and was replaced by Ivan Vagner. Ultimately, neither Vagner nor Matveev flew on this mission. He was reassigned to Soyuz MS-21, his only spaceflight, which launched on 18 March 2022. After 195 days, MS-21 landed in Kazakhstan on 29 September 2022.
