= Expedition 66 =

Long-duration mission to the International Space Station

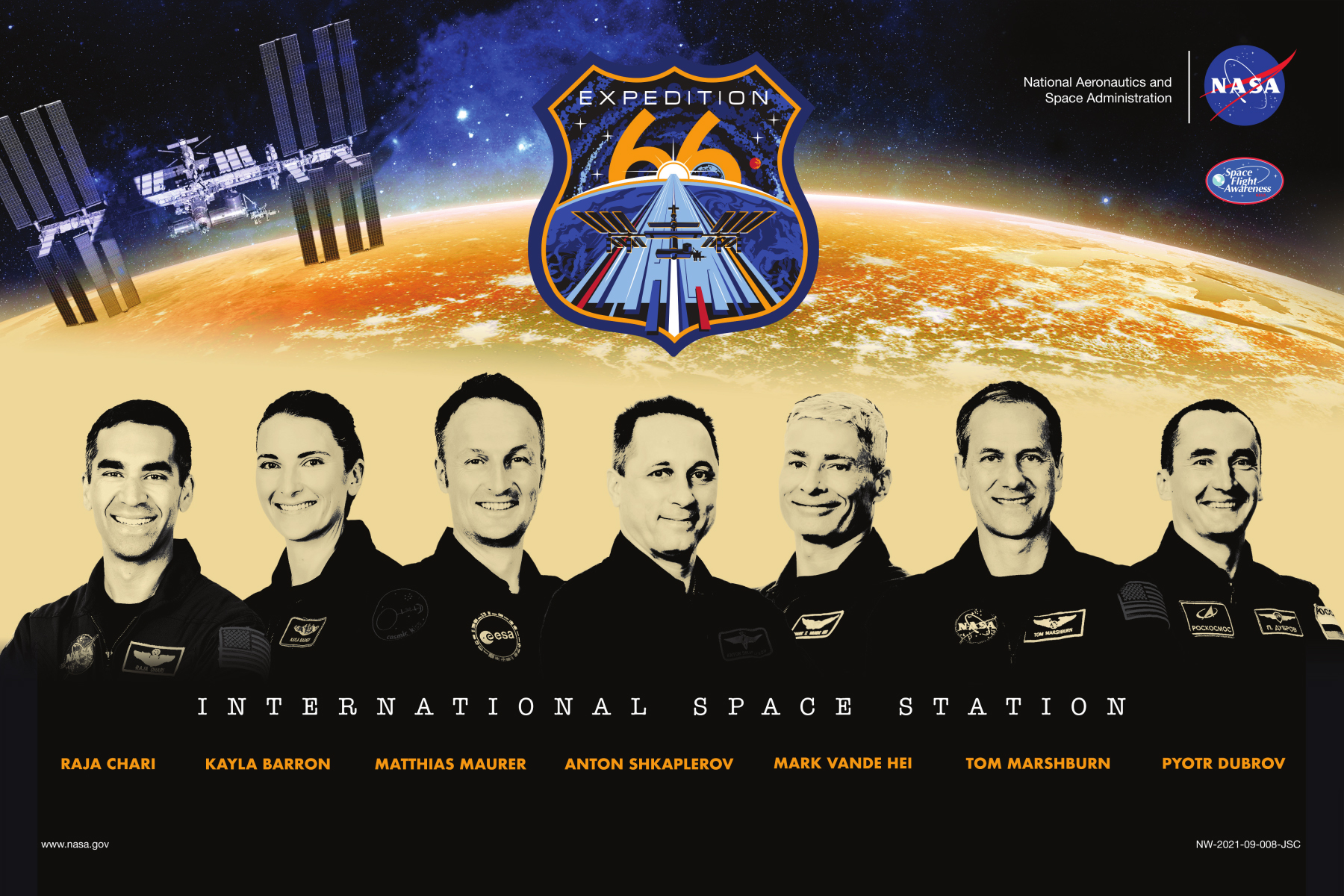
- Promotional poster
- Mission type: Long-duration expedition
- Operator: NASA / Roscosmos
- Mission duration: 164 days, 6 hours and 7 minutes

Expedition
- Space station: International Space Station
- Began: 17 October 2021, 01:14 UTC
- Ended: 30 March 2022, 07:21:03
- Arrived aboard: Soyuz MS-18; SpaceX Crew-2; Soyuz MS-19; SpaceX Crew-3; Soyuz MS-21
- Departed aboard: SpaceX Crew-2; Soyuz MS-19

Crew
- Crew size: 3-10
- Members: Expedition 65/66: Shane Kimbrough; Megan McArthur; Akihiko Hoshide; Thomas Pesquet; Anton Shkaplerov; Expedition 64/65/66: Pyotr Dubrov; Mark T. Vande Hei; Expedition 66/67: Raja Chari; Thomas Marshburn; Kayla Barron; Matthias Maurer; Oleg Artemyev; Denis Matveev; Sergey Korsakov
- EVAs: 4
- EVA duration: 25 hours, 31 minutes
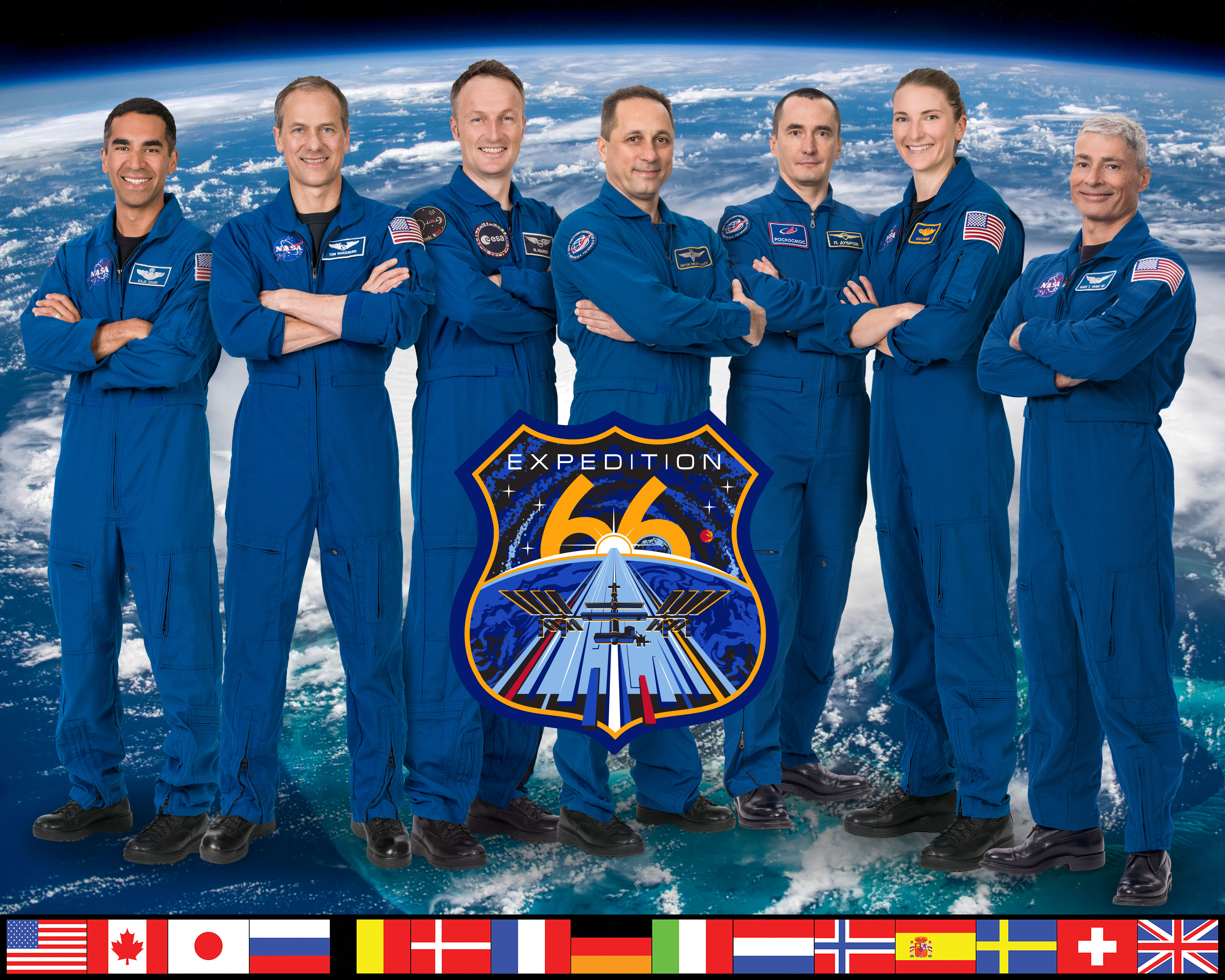
- Expedition 66 mission patch, resembling that of U.S. Route 66 Expedition 66 crew portrait ISS expeditions

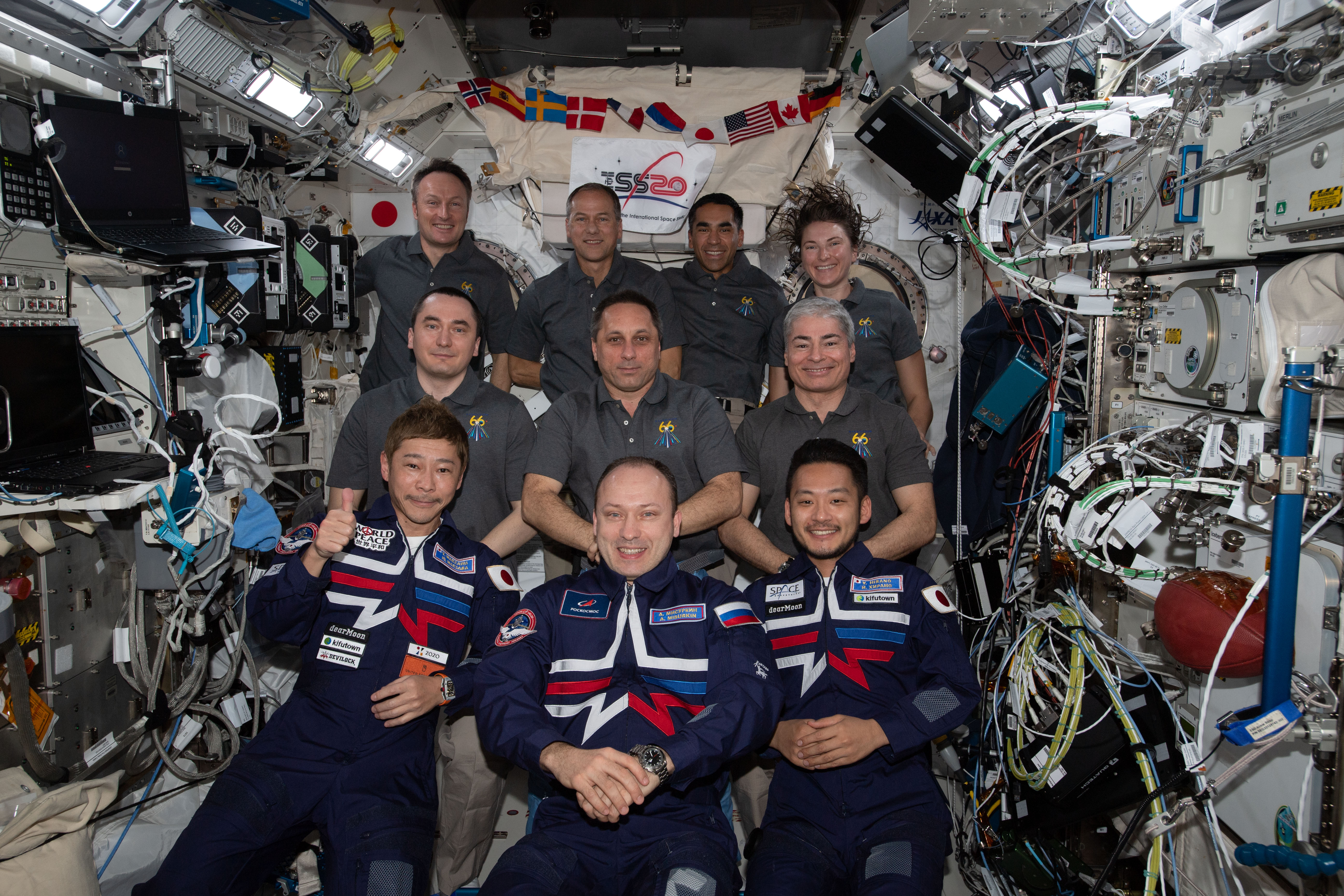
The crews from Expedition 66 crew (2nd and 3rd row) with non-expedition Soyuz MS-20 crew (1st row).

Expedition 66 was the 66th long-duration expedition to the International Space Station. The mission began after the departure of Soyuz MS-18 on 17 October 2021. It was commanded by European Space Agency astronaut Thomas Pesquet, the fourth European astronaut and first French astronaut to command the ISS until 8 November 2021 when Russian cosmonaut Anton Shkaplerov, who arrived aboard Soyuz MS-19, took over his command.

Pesquet was transported to the ISS on SpaceX Crew-2 in April 2021, joined by NASA astronauts Shane Kimbrough and Megan McArthur and Japan Aerospace Exploration Agency (JAXA) astronaut Akihiko Hoshide. Crew-2 from Expedition 65 extended their tour of duty on the ISS to become part of Expedition 66, along with Russian cosmonaut Pyotr Dubrov and NASA astronaut Mark Vande Hei, who both launched on Soyuz MS-18 and returned to Earth on Soyuz MS-19, following their extended mission. Russian cosmonaut Shkaplerov launched on Soyuz MS-19, along with two participants in the joint film project between Roscosmos and Channel One, The Challenge: film director Klim Shipenko and actress Yulia Peresild.

SpaceX Crew-3, launched 10 November 2021, carried NASA astronauts Raja Chari, Thomas Marshburn, and Kayla Barron and ESA astronaut Matthias Maurer to the ISS. At the end of Expedition 66, they remained on the ISS as part of Expedition 67 while Dubrov and Vande Hei returned to Earth aboard Soyuz MS-19. However, continued international collaboration has been thrown into doubt by the 2022 Russian invasion of Ukraine and related sanctions on Russia.

== Crew ==
Flight	Astronaut	First part (17 October – 8 November 2021)	Second part (8–11 November 2021)	Third part (11 November 2021 – 18 March 2022)	Fourth part (18 – 30 March 2022)
Soyuz MS-19	Anton Shkaplerov, Roscosmos; Fourth and last spaceflight	Flight engineer	Commander		
Soyuz MS-19	Pyotr Dubrov, Roscosmos; First spaceflight	Flight engineer			
Soyuz MS-19	Mark T. Vande Hei, NASA; Second spaceflight	Flight engineer			
SpaceX Crew-2	Shane Kimbrough, NASA; Third and last spaceflight	Flight engineer	Off station		
SpaceX Crew-2	Megan McArthur, NASA; Second and last spaceflight	Flight engineer	Off station		
SpaceX Crew-2	Akihiko Hoshide, JAXA; Third spaceflight	Flight engineer	Off station		
SpaceX Crew-2	Thomas Pesquet, ESA; Second spaceflight	Commander	Off station		
SpaceX Crew-3	Raja Chari, NASA; First spaceflight	Off station		Flight engineer	
SpaceX Crew-3	Thomas Marshburn, NASA; Third and last spaceflight	Off station		Flight engineer	
SpaceX Crew-3	Kayla Barron, NASA; First spaceflight	Off station		Flight engineer	
SpaceX Crew-3	Matthias Maurer, ESA; First spaceflight	Off station		Flight engineer	
Soyuz MS-21	Oleg Artemyev, Roscosmos; Third and last spaceflight	Off station			Flight engineer
Soyuz MS-21	Denis Matveev, Roscosmos; Only spaceflight	Off station			Flight engineer
Soyuz MS-21	Sergey Korsakov, Roscosmos; Only spaceflight	Off station			Flight engineer
