= Vasily Avchenko =

Russian writer and journalist

- Василий Авченко
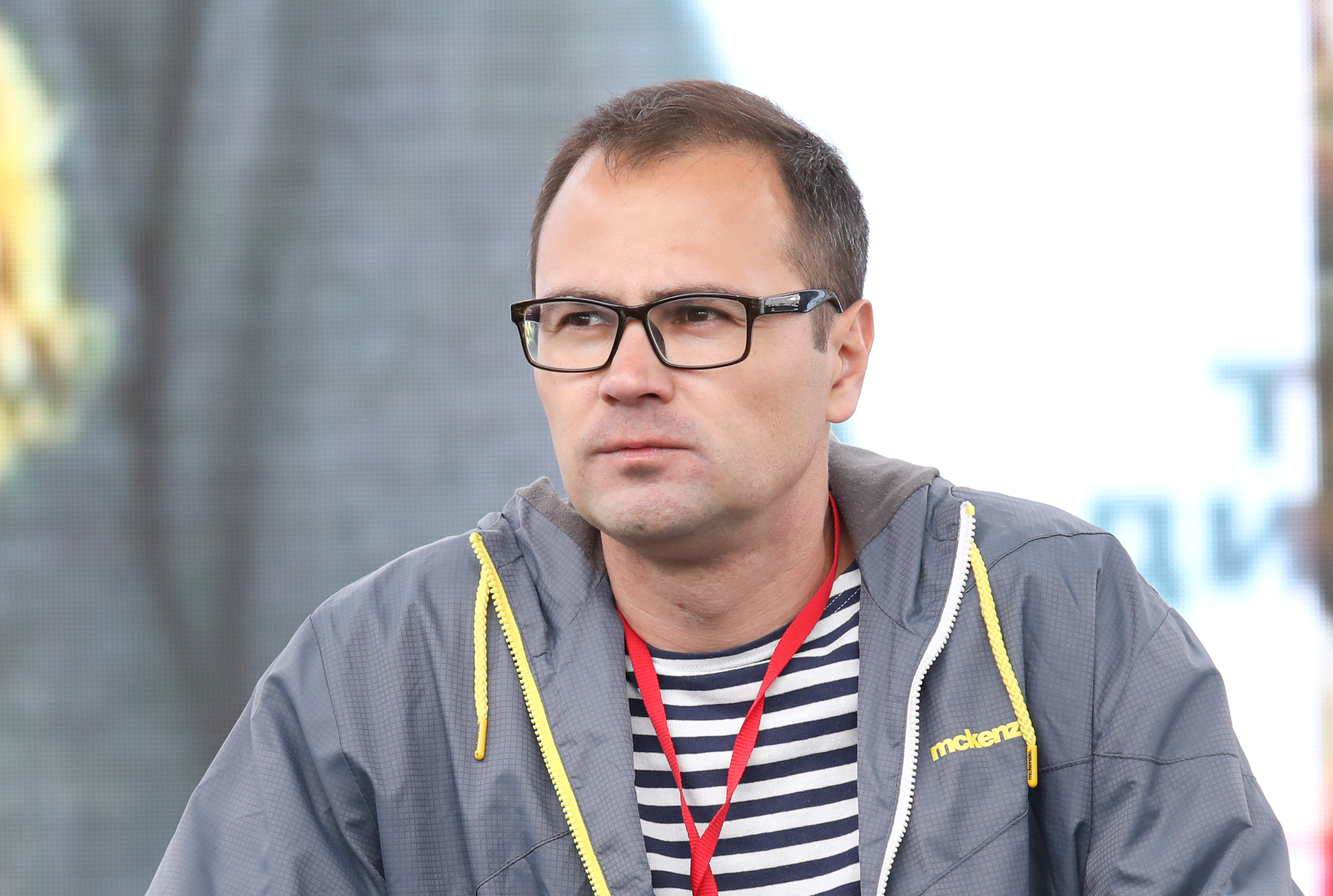
- Avchenko in 2023
- Born: 14 July 1980 (age 46); Cheremkhovo, Irkutsk Oblast, Russian SFSR
- Education: Far Eastern State University
- Occupations: writer; publicist; journalist

Vasily Olegovich Avchenko (Russian: Василий Олегович Авченко; born July 14, 1980, Cheremkhovo, Irkutsk Oblast) is a Russian writer and journalist.

== Biography ==
Born on July 14, 1980 in the city of Cheremkhovo, Irkutsk Oblast, in a family of geologists. He Lives in Vladivostok. Graduated with honors from the journalism department of the Far Eastern State University in 2002.

Worked in the Vladivostok newspapers "Daily News", "Far Eastern Scientist", "Vladivostok" and others.

He acted as a publicist in the newspaper "Duel" (article "Information Control Society", co-authored with A. Samsonov), since 2009 - in the regional issue of Novaya Gazeta.

He published in the magazines Novy Mir, Druzhba Narodov, Znamya, Moskva, "Dvina", "Nizhny Novgorod", Pacific almanac "Rubezh", almanac "Yenisei".

In July 2015, Roskomnadzor issued a warning to the editors of Novaya Gazeta for publishing an excerpt from Vasily Avchenko's book. The excerpt from "Crystal in a Transparent Frame" used an obscene word, but several letters in it were replaced with dots.

In 2016, the book "Crystal in a Transparent Frame" was shortlisted for the Bunin Prize.

He became the author of the text for the annual Russian cultural and educational event Total Dictation in 2023.

=== Political views ===
In the spring of 2010, he signed the appeal of the Russian opposition Putin Must Go.

In August 2017, he was one of 20 signatories of a letter to French President Emmanuel Macron asking him to pardon the imprisoned terrorist Ilyich Ramirez Sanchez.

In February 2022, he supported the Russian invasion of Ukraine. Since September 2023, he has been on Canada's sanctions list as an accomplice of the Russian regime and a disseminator of disinformation.
