= Soyuz MS-21 =

2022 Russian crewed spaceflight to the ISS

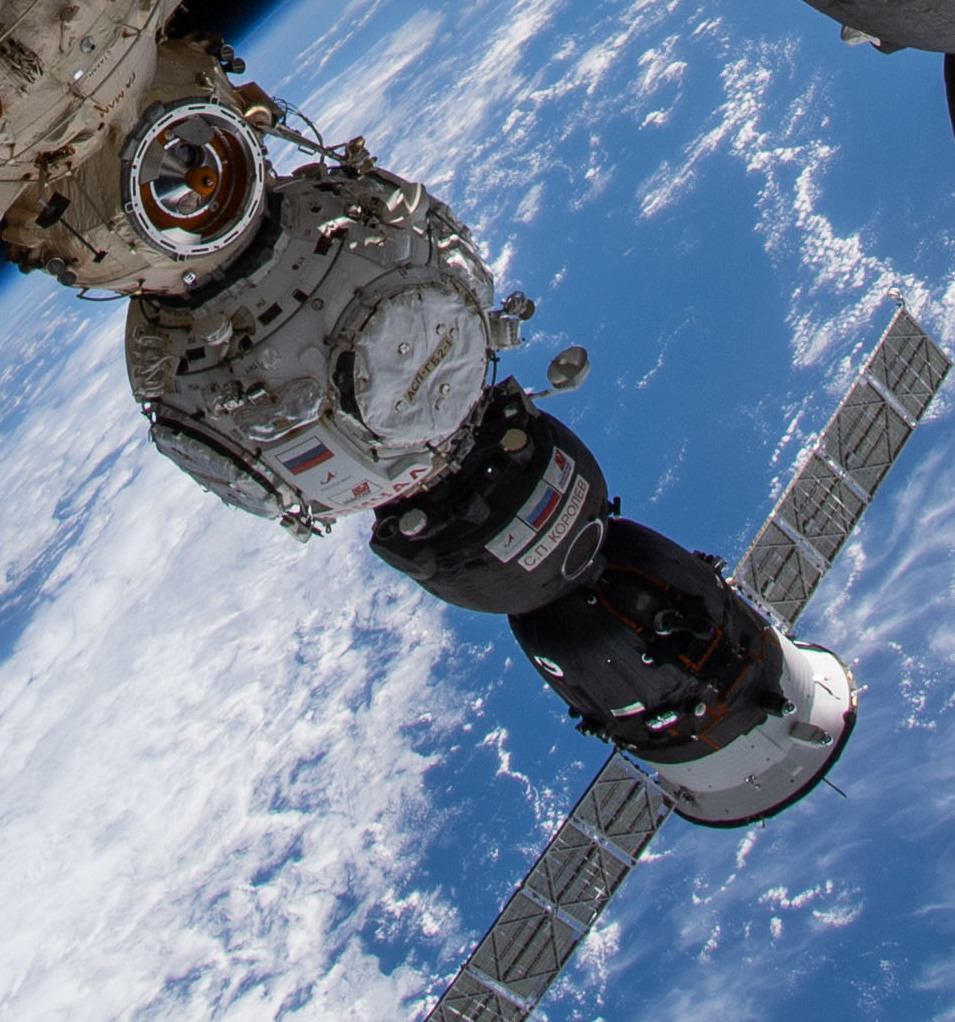
- Soyuz MS-21 docked to the ISS
- Names: ISS 67S
- Mission type: ISS crew transport
- Operator: Roscosmos
- COSPAR ID: 2022-028A
- SATCAT no.: 52086
- Mission duration: 194 days, 19 hours, 2 minutes

Spacecraft properties
- Spacecraft: Soyuz MS-21 No. 750 Korolyov
- Spacecraft type: Soyuz MS
- Manufacturer: Energia

Crew
- Crew size: 3
- Members: Oleg Artemyev; Denis Matveev; Sergey Korsakov
- Callsign: Don

Start of mission
- Launch date: 18 March 2022, 15:55:18 UTC
- Rocket: Soyuz 2.1a
- Launch site: Baikonur, Site 31/6
- Contractor: RKTs Progress

End of mission
- Landing date: 29 September 2022, 10:57:12 UTC
- Landing site: Kazakh Steppe (47°23′N 69°39′E)

Orbital parameters
- Reference system: Geocentric orbit
- Regime: Low Earth orbit
- Inclination: 51.64°

Docking with ISS
- Docking port: Prichal nadir
- Docking date: 18 March 2022, 19:12:06 UTC
- Undocking date: 29 September 2022, 07:34:20 UTC
- Time docked: 194 days, 12 hours, 22 minutes
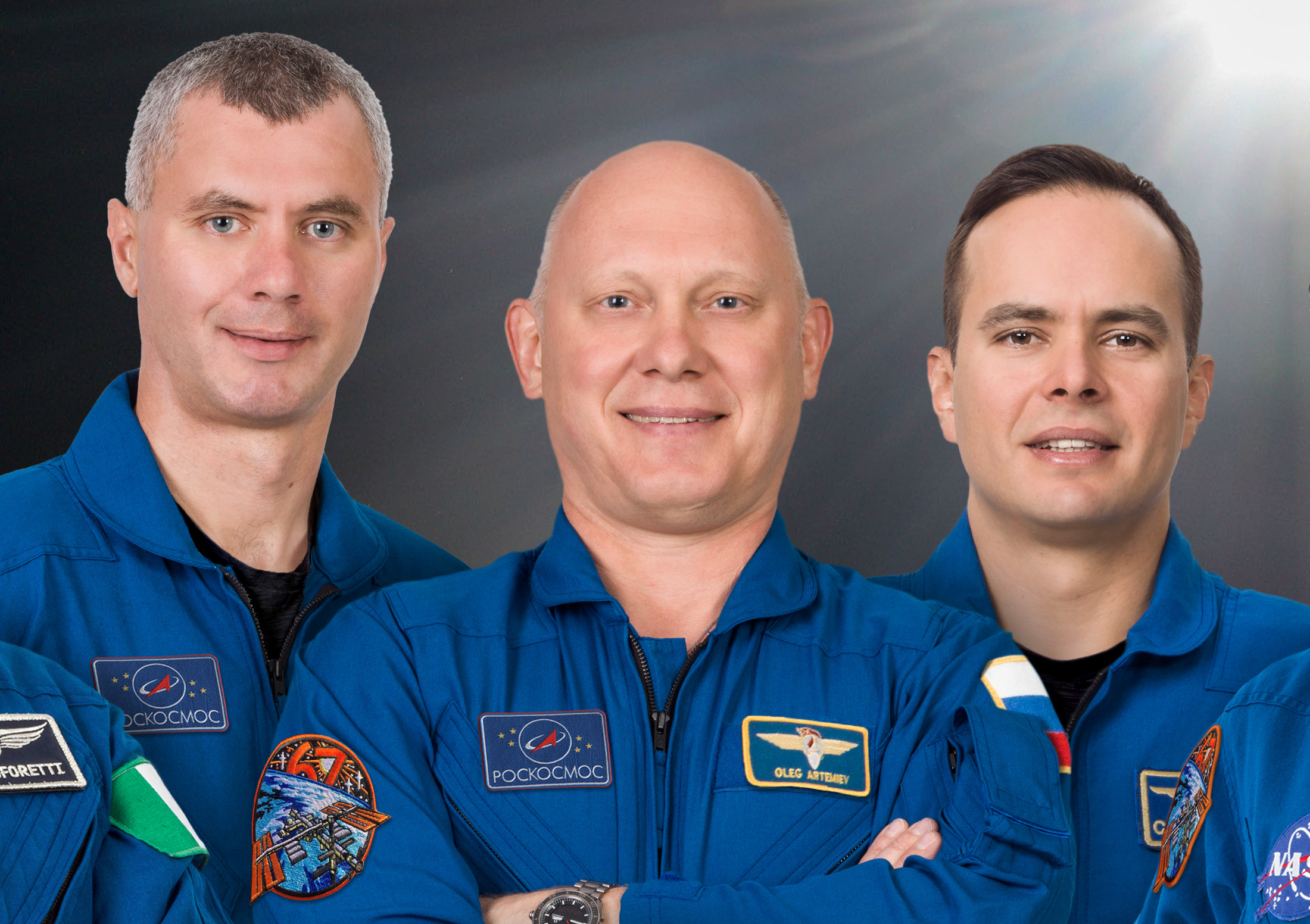
- Mission insignia, inspired by the crest of the Bauman Moscow State Technical University From left: Matveev, Artemyev and Korsakov Soyuz programme

Soyuz MS-21 was a Russian Soyuz spaceflight to the International Space Station (ISS) with a crew of three launched from Baikonur on 18 March 2022. The launch was previously planned for 30 March 2022, but in the provisional flight manifest prepared by Roscosmos by the end of summer 2020, the launch of Soyuz MS-21 was advanced to 18 March 2022.

It was the first mission to the ISS with three Roscosmos cosmonauts.

On 29 September 2022, after 6 months and 11 days, the mission completed successfully as planned with a landing on the Kazakh Steppe in Kazakhstan.

== Crew ==
The three-Russian member crew were named in May 2021. Although NASA had not decided whether or not they would purchase a seat on the flight, NASA astronaut Loral O'Hara was preparing to replace Sergey Korsakov if the agency decided to buy a seat. Later, NASA decided not to acquire a seat on the Soyuz MS-21 launching in March 2022, deferring a NASA Roscosmos seat swap for Soyuz MS-22 and SpaceX Crew-5.

Prime crew
| Position | Cosmonaut |
|---|---|
| Commander | Oleg Artemyev; Expedition 66/67; Third and last spaceflight |
| Flight engineer | Denis Matveev; Expedition 66/67; Only spaceflight |
| Flight engineer | Sergey Korsakov; Expedition 66/67; Only spaceflight |

Backup crew
| Position | Cosmonaut |
|---|---|
| Commander | Sergey Prokopyev |
| Flight engineer | Dmitry Petelin |
| Flight engineer | Anna Kikina |

== Arrival suits ==
The arriving cosmonauts at the station have gained particular international attention after entering in bright yellow suits with blue elements, having changed before and after into different suits. International commentators saw in these colours the national colours of Ukraine and interpreted the personal choice of suits by the cosmonauts as a sign of their sympathy for Ukraine in the light of the parallel ongoing 2022 Russian invasion of Ukraine, which strained also space cooperation such as the ISS program after international sanctions on Russia. The cosmonauts said when asked about the colours that the yellow suits needed to be used, and Roscosmos followed with a statement that the colours are to be read as the identifying colours of the Bauman Moscow State Technical University, from which all three cosmonauts graduated.
