= Sergey Korsakov (cosmonaut) =

Russian cosmonaut (born 1984)

- Сергей Корсаков
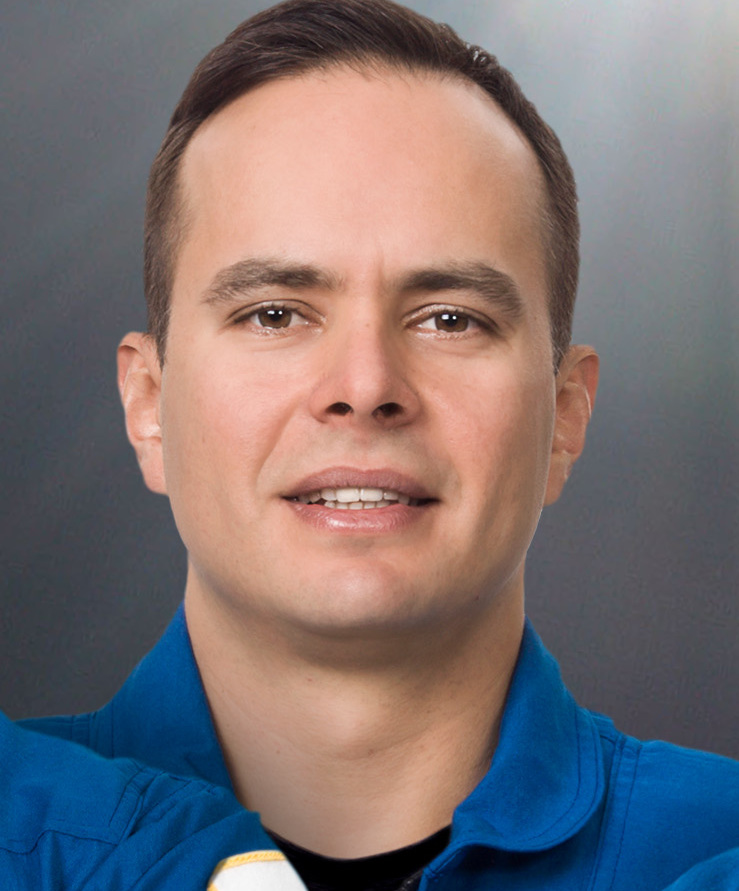
- Korsakov in 2021
- Born: 1 September 1984 (age 42); Frunze, Kirghiz SSR, USSR
- Education: Bauman Moscow State Technical University
- Space career

Roscosmos cosmonaut
- Current occupation: Test cosmonaut
- Previous occupation: Engineer
- Status: Retired
- Time in space: 194 days, 19 hours, 1 minute
- Selection: TsPK 2012 Cosmonaut Group
- Missions: Soyuz MS-21 (Expedition 66/67)
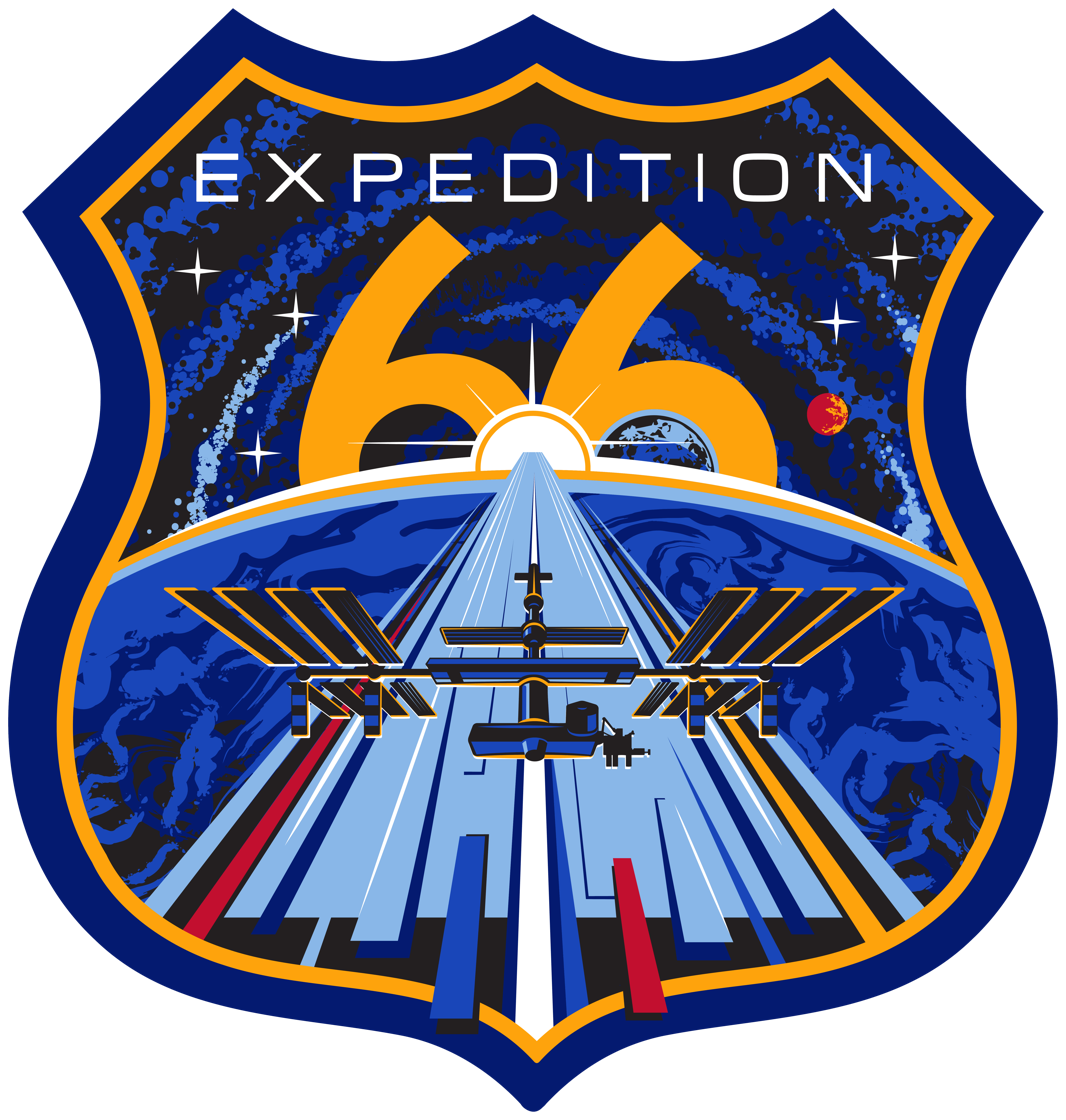
- Mission insignia
- Retired: 31 July 2026

Sergey Vladimirovich Korsakov (Russian Cyrillic: Сергей Владимирович Корсаков; born 1 September 1984 in Frunze, Kirghiz SSR) is a former Russian cosmonaut selected by Roscosmos in 2012. He was scheduled to make his first flight into space in April 2021 as a flight engineer aboard Soyuz MS-18 ahead of a stay aboard the International Space Station; but was replaced on the crew by Mark Vande Hei in March of that year. He was then assigned to Soyuz MS-21, which launched successfully March 18, 2022.

== Education ==
Korsakov graduated with high honors from the Bauman Moscow State Technical University in 2006 with a degree in rocketry. After his selection as a cosmonaut in 2012, he was appointed as a test cosmonaut in 2014.
