= Soyuz MS-18 =

2021 Russian crewed spaceflight to the ISS

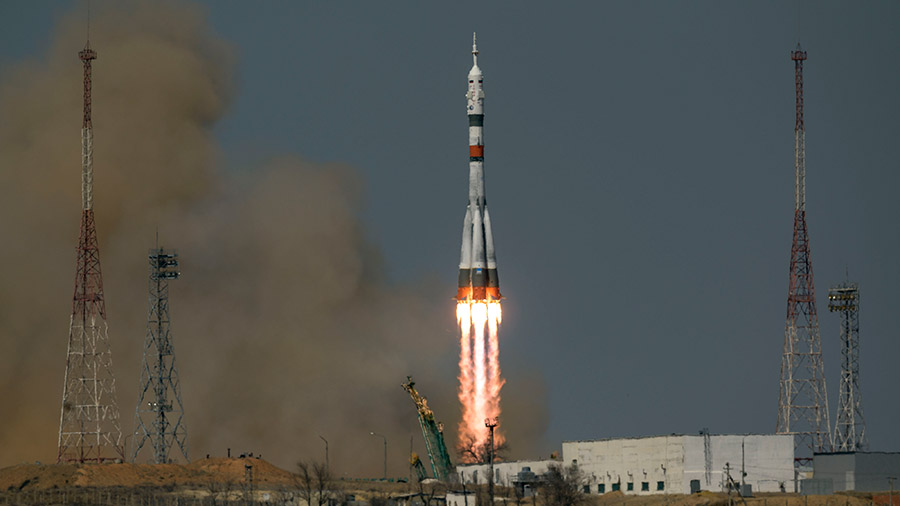
- Y. A. Gagarin launches atop a Soyuz-2.1a
- Names: ISS 64S
- Mission type: ISS crew transport
- Operator: Roscosmos
- COSPAR ID: 2021-029A
- SATCAT no.: 48159
- Mission duration: 190 days, 20 hours and 53 minutes

Spacecraft properties
- Spacecraft: Soyuz MS no. 748 Y. A. Gagarin
- Spacecraft type: Soyuz MS
- Manufacturer: RSC Energia

Crew
- Crew size: 3
- Launching: Oleg Novitsky; Pyotr Dubrov; Mark T. Vande Hei
- Landing: Oleg Novitsky; Klim Shipenko; Yulia Peresild
- Callsign: Kazbek

Start of mission
- Launch date: 9 April 2021, 07:42:41 UTC
- Rocket: Soyuz-2.1a
- Launch site: Baikonur Cosmodrome, Site 31
- Contractor: RKTs Progress

End of mission
- Landing date: 17 October 2021, 04:35:44 UTC
- Landing site: Kazakh Steppe, Kazakhstan

Orbital parameters
- Reference system: Geocentric orbit
- Regime: Low Earth orbit
- Inclination: 51.66°

Docking with ISS
- Docking port: Rassvet nadir
- Docking date: 9 April 2021, 11:05 UTC
- Undocking date: 28 September 2021, 12:21 UTC
- Time docked: 172 days, 1 hour and 16 minutes

Docking with ISS (relocation)
- Docking port: Nauka nadir
- Docking date: 28 September 2021, 13:04 UTC
- Undocking date: 17 October 2021, 01:14:00 UTC
- Time docked: 18 days, 12 hours and 10 minutes
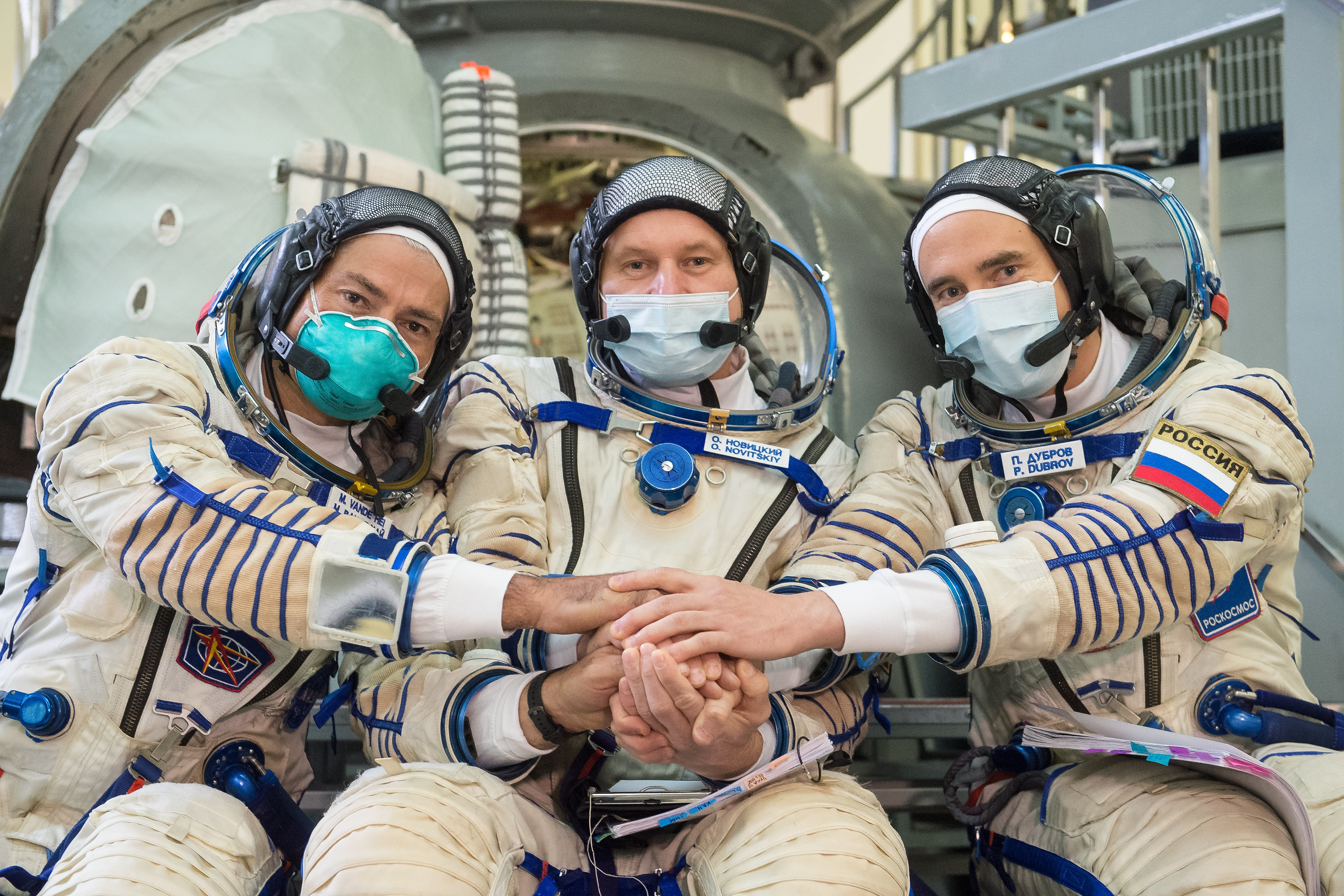
- Launch mission patch Launching crew, from left: Vande Hei, Novitsky and Dubrov Soyuz programme

Soyuz MS-18 (spacecraft named "Y. A. Gagarin") was a Soyuz spaceflight that was launched on 9 April 2021 at 07:42:41 UTC. It transported three members of the Expedition 64 crew to the International Space Station (ISS). Soyuz MS-18 was the 146th crewed flight of a Soyuz spacecraft. The launching crew consisted of a Russian commander, a Russian flight engineer, and an American flight engineer of NASA. The spacecraft returned to Earth on 17 October 2021 following 191 days in space. The flight served as the landing vehicle for the Russian film director Klim Shipenko and actress Yulia Peresild who launched to the ISS aboard Soyuz MS-19 and spent twelve days in space in order to film a movie, Vyzov (Russian: Вызов, lit. 'The Challenge').

On 9 March 2021, Roscosmos announced that, at NASA's request, they would alter the existing flight plan to include Mark Vande Hei instead of Sergei Korsakov in the main crew and Anne McClain instead of Dmitriy Petelin in the backup one effectively extending NASA astronauts' flights on Soyuz spacecraft for at least another flight. This arrangement was an in-kind service for the supplemental crew transportation service between NASA and Roscosmos, without any financial exchange between the two agencies.

== Crew ==
Prime crew
Position	Launching crew member	Landing crew member
Commander	Oleg Novitsky, Roscosmos; Expedition 64/65; Third spaceflight	
Flight engineer/Spaceflight Participant	Pyotr Dubrov, Roscosmos; Expedition 64/65/66; First spaceflight	Klim Shipenko; Only spaceflight Sponsor: Channel 1
Flight engineer/Spaceflight Participant	Mark T. Vande Hei, NASA; Expedition 64/65/66; Second spaceflight	Yulia Peresild; Only spaceflight Sponsor: Channel 1
Shipenko and Peresild visited the ISS to film the movie The Challenge.

Backup crew
Position	Crew member
Commander	Anton Shkaplerov, Roscosmos
Flight engineer	Oleg Artemyev, Roscosmos
Flight engineer	Anne McClain, NASA

== Expansion of Russian Orbital Segment ==
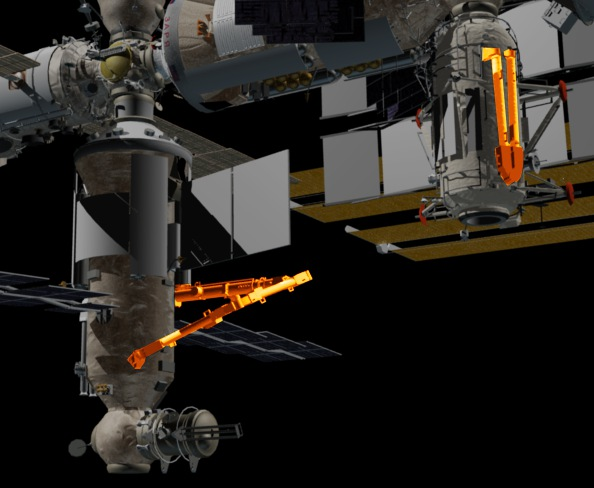
Artist's impression of the ERA attached to the Nauka module (left). The spare joint is attached to the Rassvet module (right).

The Soyuz MS-18 crew arrived at ISS on 9 April 2021, well ahead of the launch and docking of Nauka module launching on a Proton-M launch vehicle on 21 July 2021 that carried a portion of the European Robotic Arm (ERA). A spacewalk was undertaken by Expedition 65 (Soyuz MS-18 crew members) to prepare the ISS Russian Segment for Nauka and ERA installation in the summer of 2021. Two other spacewalks for outfitting Nauka were also conducted by Soyuz MS-18 crew members.

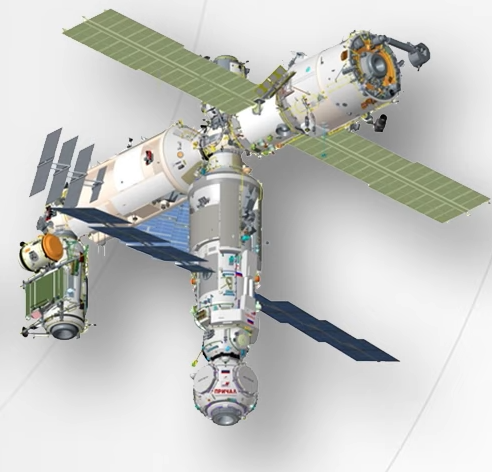
ISS russian orbital segment after docking of UM Prichal module

The UM Prichal module launched to the International Space Station on 24 November 2021 with Progress M-UM. One port on Prichal is equipped with an active hybrid docking port, which enables docking with the Nauka module. The remaining five ports are passive hybrids, enabling docking of Soyuz and Progress vehicles, as well as heavier modules and future spacecraft with modified docking systems.

The Prichal module was the second addition to the Russian Orbital Segment (ROS) in 2021.

Soyuz MS-18 crew with Expedition 64 crew.

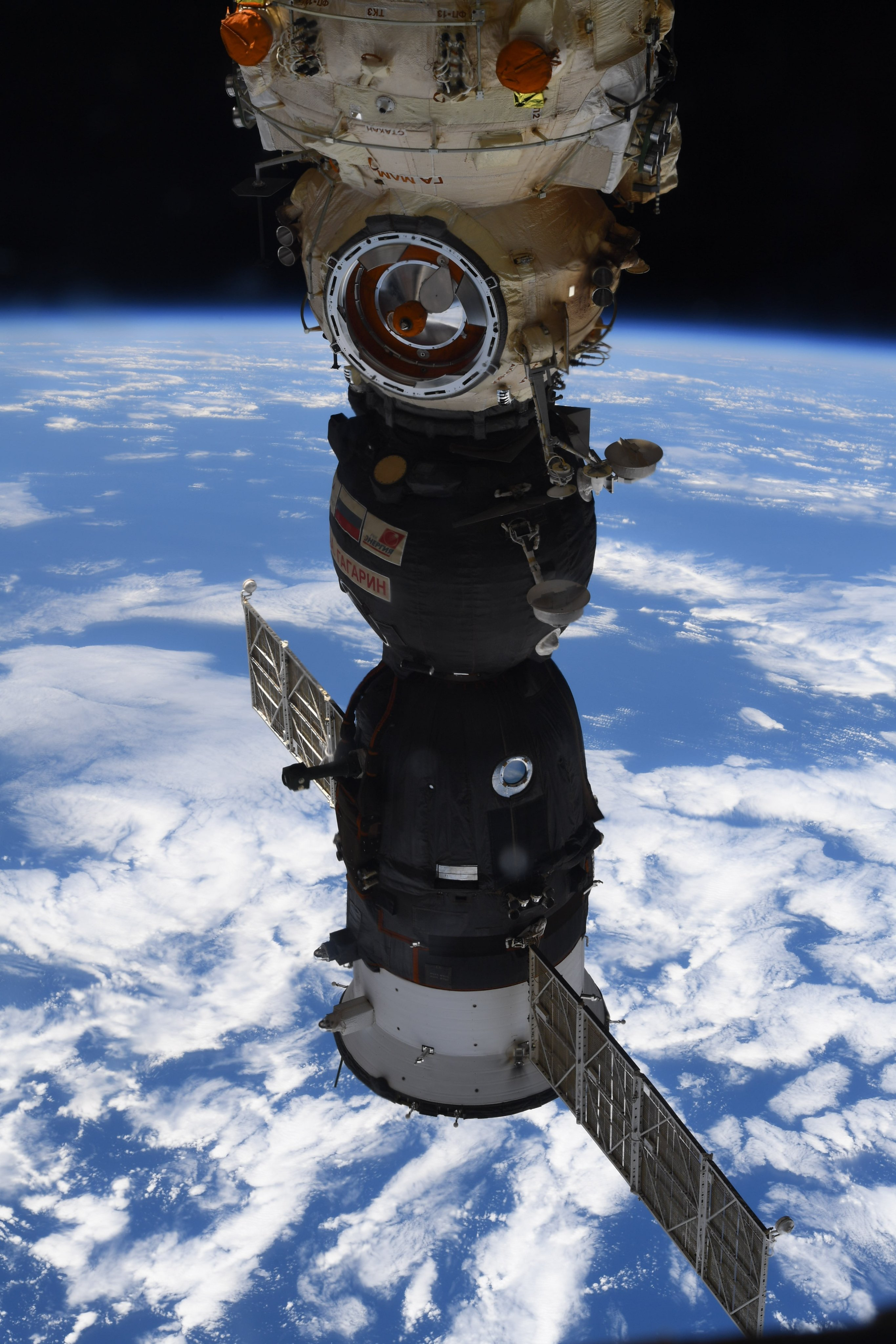
Soyuz MS-18 docked to Nauka after relocation.

== Engine firing incident ==
On 15 October 2021, at 09:02 UTC, during preparation of the ship's propulsion system for landing, the Soyuz MS-18 inadvertently fired its thrusters beyond its planned time, which resulted in changing the orientation of the ISS by as much as 57°, at 09:13 UTC. The station's attitude control system then counteracted that motion by activating thrusters of the Russian Segment. The erroneous firing of Soyuz engines was the result of a procedural error in the instructions sent by mission control to Oleg Novitsky ahead of the test. Fortunately, the flight control system aboard the Soyuz spacecraft had a limit set for the engine testing, which generated a cutoff command as soon as the firing consumed all the propellant allocated for the test. As a result, all the propellant reserves aboard the spacecraft needed for landing remained untouched. The crew was not in danger and it was the second such incident since the loss of control of Nauka on 29 July 2021.

== Return ==
The director and actress returned to Earth on 17 October 2021 on Soyuz MS-18 with commander Oleg Novitsky. Pyotr Dubrov and Mark Vande Hei, who arrived at the ISS on Soyuz MS-18, joined Shkaplerov on the landing of Soyuz MS-19.
