= Expedition 65 =

65th Long-duration mission to the International Space Station

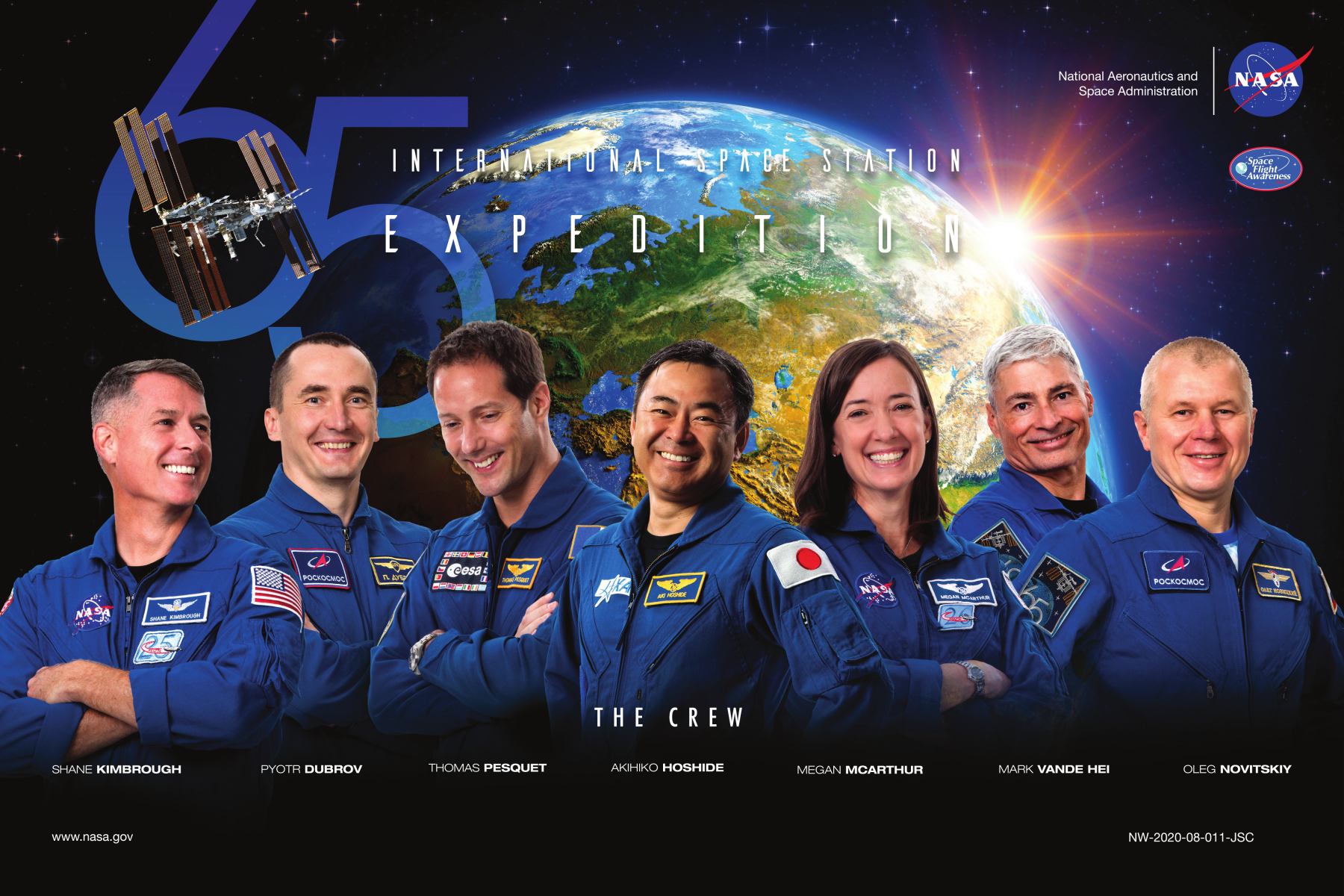
- Promotional poster
- Mission type: Long-duration expedition
- Operator: NASA / Roscosmos
- Mission duration: 182 days, 23 hours and 39 minutes

Expedition
- Space station: International Space Station
- Began: 17 April 2021, 01:34:04 UTC
- Ended: 17 October 2021, 01:14 UTC
- Arrived aboard: SpaceX Crew-1; Soyuz MS-18; SpaceX Crew-2; Soyuz MS-19
- Departed aboard: SpaceX Crew-1; Soyuz MS-18

Crew
- Crew size: 7-11
- Members: Expedition 64/65: Mike Hopkins; Victor Glover; Soichi Noguchi; Shannon Walker; Oleg Novitsky; Expedition 64/65/66: Pyotr Dubrov; Mark T. Vande Hei; Expedition 65/66: Shane Kimbrough; Megan McArthur; Akihiko Hoshide; Thomas Pesquet; Anton Shkaplerov
- EVAs: ≥4 (planned); 7
- EVA duration: 50 hours
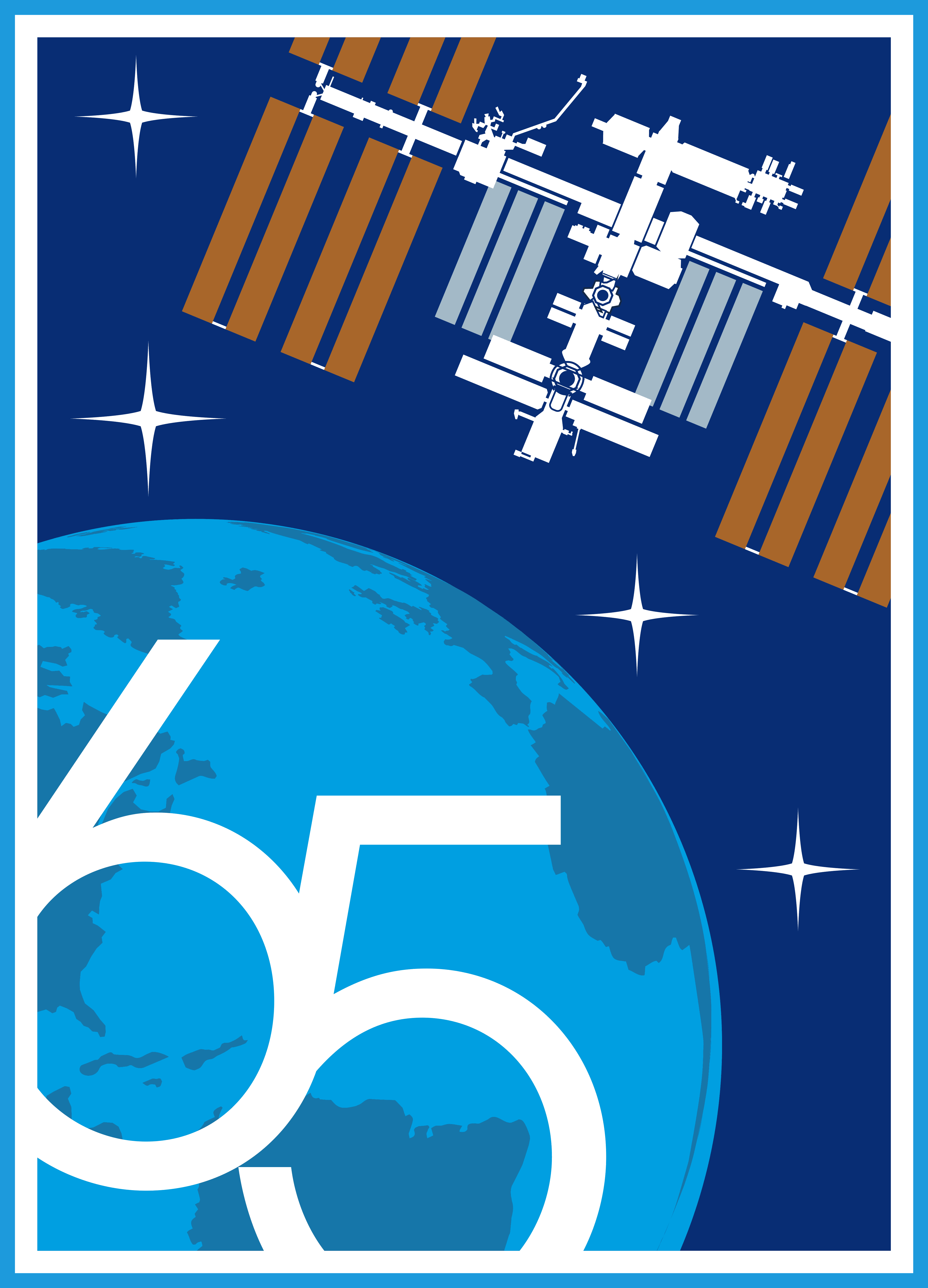
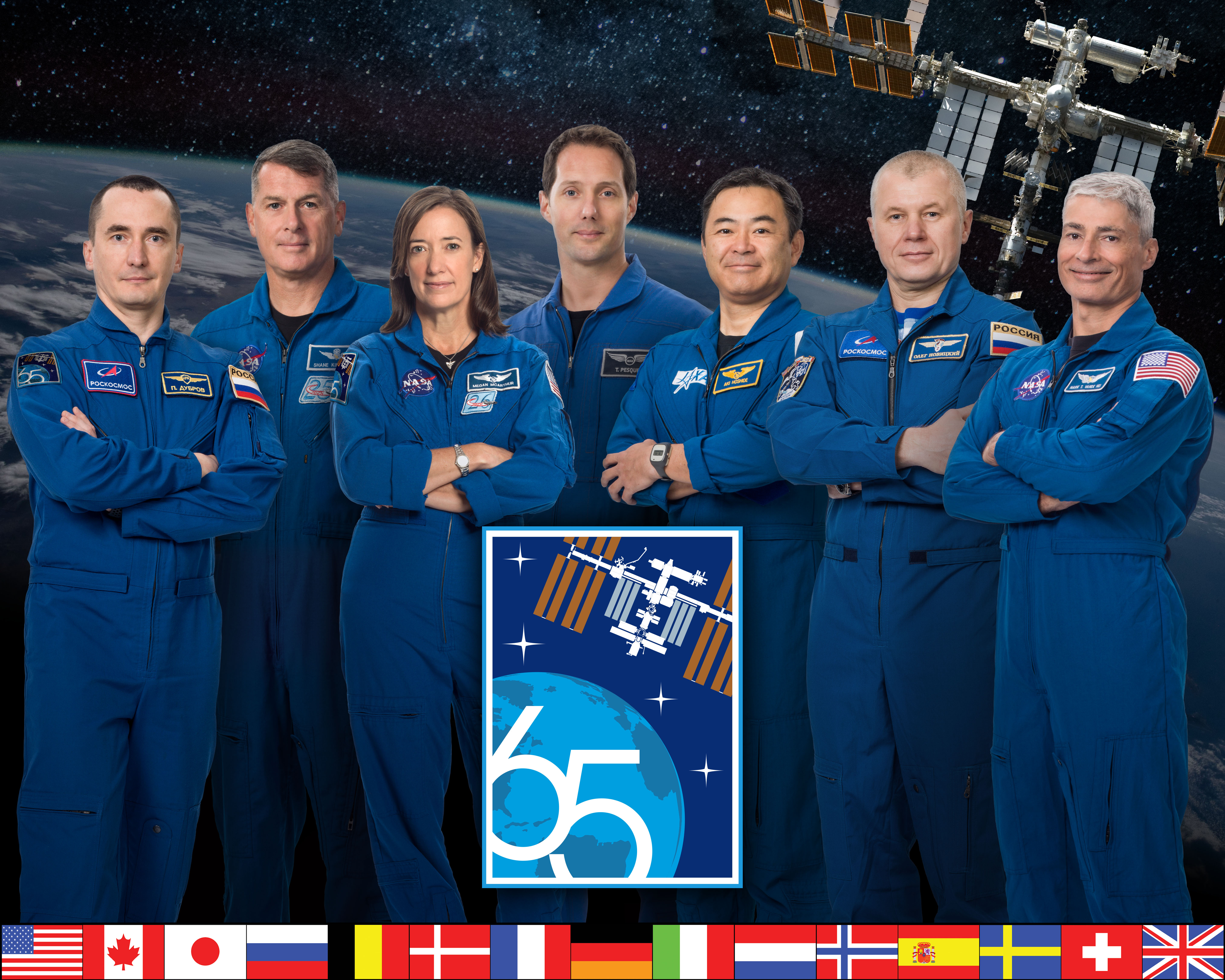
- Expedition 65 mission patch Expedition 65 crew portrait ISS expeditions

Expedition 65 was the 65th long duration expedition to the International Space Station. The mission began on 17 April 2021 with the departure of Soyuz MS-17 and was initially commanded by NASA astronaut Shannon Walker serving as the third female ISS commander, who launched in November 2020 aboard SpaceX Crew-1 alongside NASA astronauts Mike Hopkins and Victor Glover, as well as JAXA astronaut Soichi Noguchi. They were joined by the crew of Soyuz MS-18, which is made up of Russian cosmonauts Oleg Novitsky and Pyotr Dubrov, as well as NASA astronaut Mark Vande Hei.

In accordance with Crew Dragon Resilience's departure on May 2, 2021, Crew-1's crew was replaced by the crew of SpaceX Crew-2, which launched on April 23, 2021. JAXA astronaut Akihiko Hoshide took Walker's place as station commander, making Walker the shortest-serving ISS commander - holding the position for just 11 days. From October 4, 2021, ESA astronaut Thomas Pesquet surpassed Hoshide as commander, becoming the fourth European astronaut to command the ISS and the first French astronaut to command the orbital laboratory. The expedition ended with the departure of Soyuz MS-18 on October 17, 2021.

== Visiting modules, vehicles, crews, and spacewalks ==
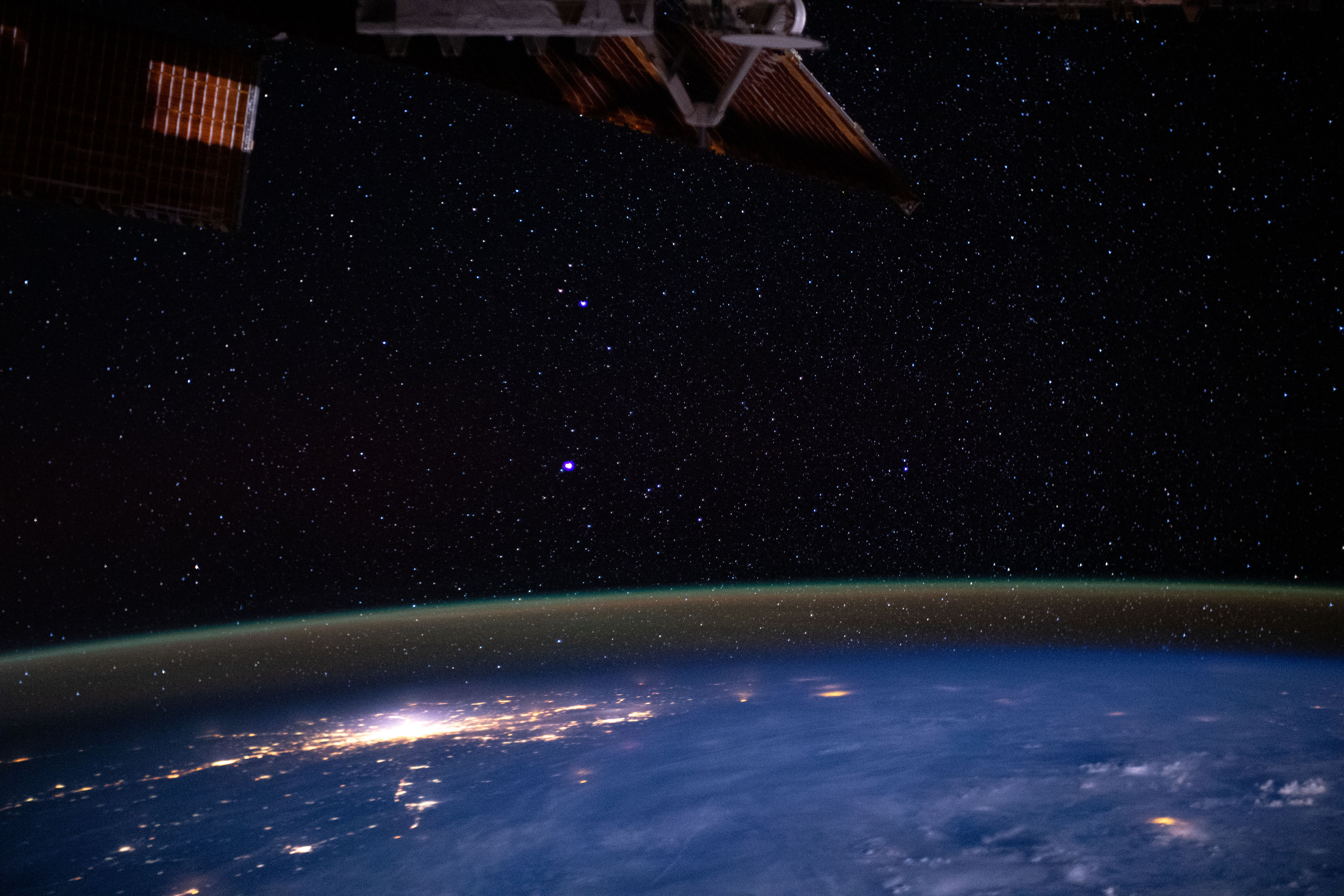
View of Earth taken during ISS Expedition 65

Expedition 65 occurred during a very busy time in the ISS's schedule, with the expedition expected to host two SpaceX Crew Dragon missions, Crew-1 and Crew-2, as well as two Soyuz flights, Soyuz MS-18 and Soyuz MS-19.

When the expedition began with the undocking of Soyuz MS-17 in April 2021, two vehicles were present on the station, Crew Dragon Resilience, carrying the SpaceX Crew-1 crew, and the Soyuz MS-18 spacecraft. Crew-1 mission specialist Shannon Walker initially commanded the station until she and her three crewmates, Mike Hopkins, Victor Glover and Soichi Noguchi, departed the station following the arrival of Crew Dragon Endeavour, carrying SpaceX Crew-2 in April 2021. Following the departure of Crew-1, Crew-2 mission specialist Akihiko Hoshide took over as station commander, making him the second Japanese citizen to command the ISS. On 5 October 2021, Soyuz MS-19 launched, carrying Russian cosmonaut Anton Shkaplerov, film director Klim Shipenko and actress Yulia Peresild. The latter two spent 12 days onboard the station as part of a movie project.

Three spacewalks were conducted by Thomas Pesquet and Shane Kimbrough on 16, 20, and 25 June from the US Orbital Segment (USOS) of the space station to install the first two Roll Out Solar Arrays (iROSA) for the station. They were delivered by SpaceX CRS-22 on 3 June 2021. The June 16 spacewalk to place an array on the 2B power channel and mast can of the P6 truss was successful until three hours into the task, when Kimbrough's suit encountered a computer problem and the spacewalkers had to return to the Quest airlock. The iROSA also encountered technical problems with deployment, resulting in the spacewalk being cut short early, having lasted 7 hours and 15 minutes.

The 20 June spacewalk begun at 11:42 UTC and lasting 6 hours and 28 minutes and saw the first iROSA's successful deployment and connection to the station's power system. The 25 June spacewalk begun at 11:52 UTC and lasting 6 hours and 45 minutes and saw the astronauts successfully install and deploy the second iROSA on the 4B mast can opposite the first iROSA.

One more spacewalk, comprising a plasma measuring instrument replacement and a bracket installation on the P4 Truss for the next iROSA pair, was planned for 24 August to be conducted by Akihiko Hoshide and Mark Vande Hei. It was postponed to 12 September after Vande Hei encountered "minor medical issues". He was replaced by Thomas Pesquet. The spacewalk began at 13:15 UTC and lasted six hours and 45 minutes.

Three spacewalks were conducted by Oleg Novitsky and Pyotr Dubrov from the Russian Orbital Segment (ROS) to facilitate the installation of Nauka with the European Robotic Arm aboard the station, as well as prepare the new module for the arrival of the Prichal docking node, which is scheduled to arrive during Expedition 66. One spacewalk was conducted on 2 June beginning at 5:53 UTC and lasted 7 hours and 19 minutes. Two more were conducted on 3 and 9 September, the former beginning at 14:41 UTC and lasting 7 hours and 54 minutes, and the latter beginning at 14:51 UTC and lasting 7 hours and 25 minutes.

== Crew ==
| Flight | Astronaut | First part (17 – 24 April 2021) | Second part (24 April – 2 May 2021) | Third part (2 May – 4 October 2021) | Fourth part (4 – 5 October 2021) | Fifth part (5 – 17 October 2021) |
|---|---|---|---|---|---|---|
| Soyuz MS-18 | Oleg Novitsky, Roscosmos; Third spaceflight | Flight engineer | | | | |
| Soyuz MS-18 | Pyotr Dubrov, Roscosmos; First spaceflight | Flight engineer | | | | |
| Soyuz MS-18 | Mark T. Vande Hei, NASA; Second spaceflight | Flight engineer | | | | |
| SpaceX Crew-1 | Mike Hopkins, NASA; Second and last spaceflight | Flight engineer | | Off station | | |
| SpaceX Crew-1 | Victor Glover, NASA; First spaceflight | Flight engineer | | Off station | | |
| SpaceX Crew-1 | Soichi Noguchi, JAXA; Third and last spaceflight | Flight engineer | | Off station | | |
| SpaceX Crew-1 | Shannon Walker, NASA; Second and last spaceflight | Commander | | Off station | | |
| SpaceX Crew-2 | Shane Kimbrough, NASA; Third and last spaceflight | Off station | Flight engineer | | | |
| SpaceX Crew-2 | Megan McArthur, NASA; Second and last spaceflight | Off station | Flight engineer | | | |
| SpaceX Crew-2 | Akihiko Hoshide, JAXA; Third spaceflight | Off station | Flight engineer | Commander | Flight engineer | |
| SpaceX Crew-2 | Thomas Pesquet, ESA; Second spaceflight | Off station | Flight engineer | | Commander | |
| Soyuz MS-19 | Anton Shkaplerov, Roscosmos; Fourth and last spaceflight | Off station | | | | Flight engineer |
