= Mark T. Vande Hei =

American engineer and NASA astronaut

Mark Vande Hei
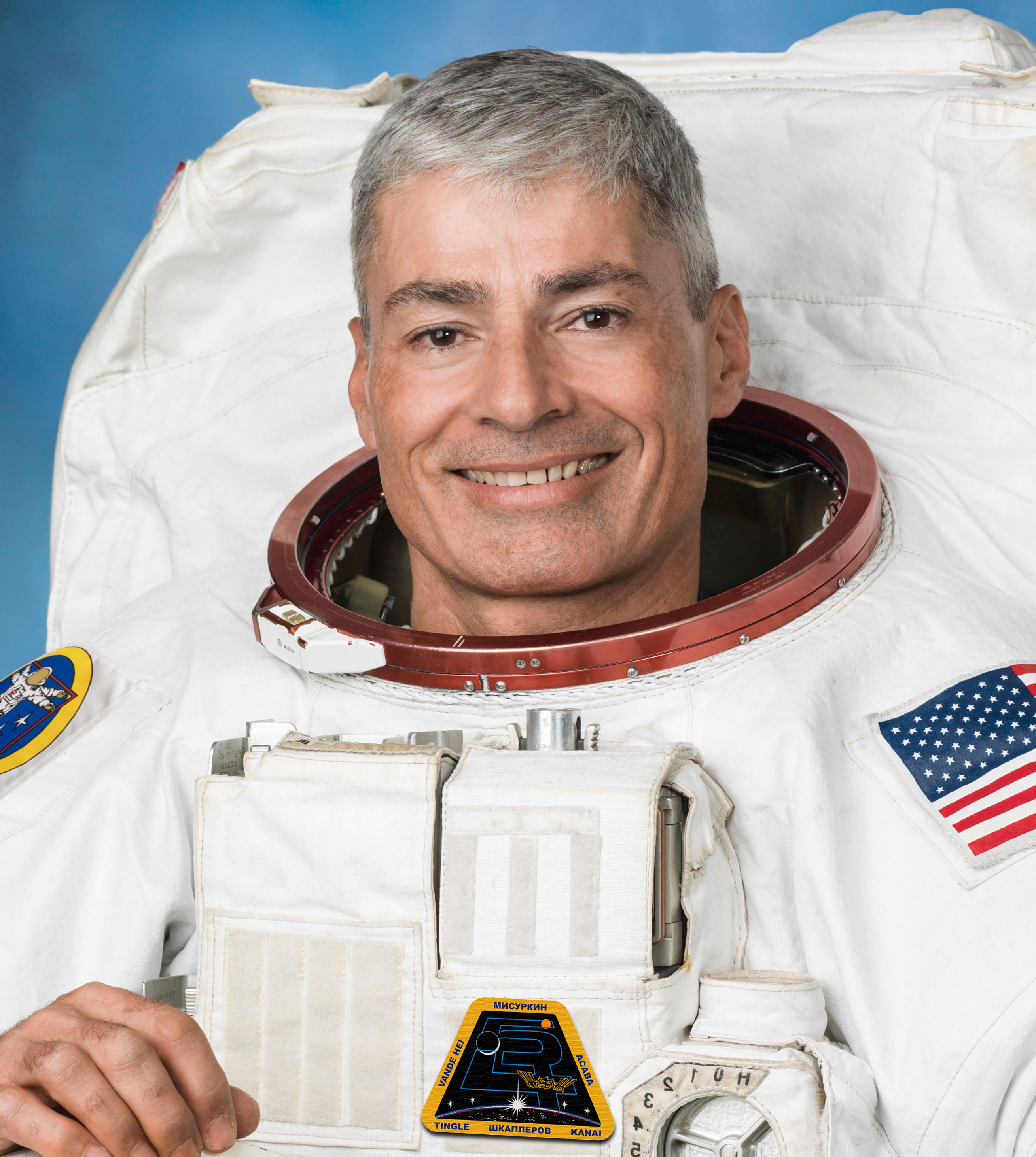
- Official portrait, 2016
- Born: Mark Thomas Vande Hei; November 10, 1966 (age 59); Falls Church, Virginia, U.S.
- Education: Saint John's University (BS); Stanford University (MS)
- Space career

NASA astronaut
- Rank: Colonel, USA
- Time in space: 523d 8h 59m
- Selection: NASA Group 20 (2009)
- Total EVAs: 4
- Total EVA time: 26h 42m
- Mission: Soyuz MS-06 (Expedition 53/54); Soyuz MS-18/Soyuz MS-19 (Expedition 64/65/66)
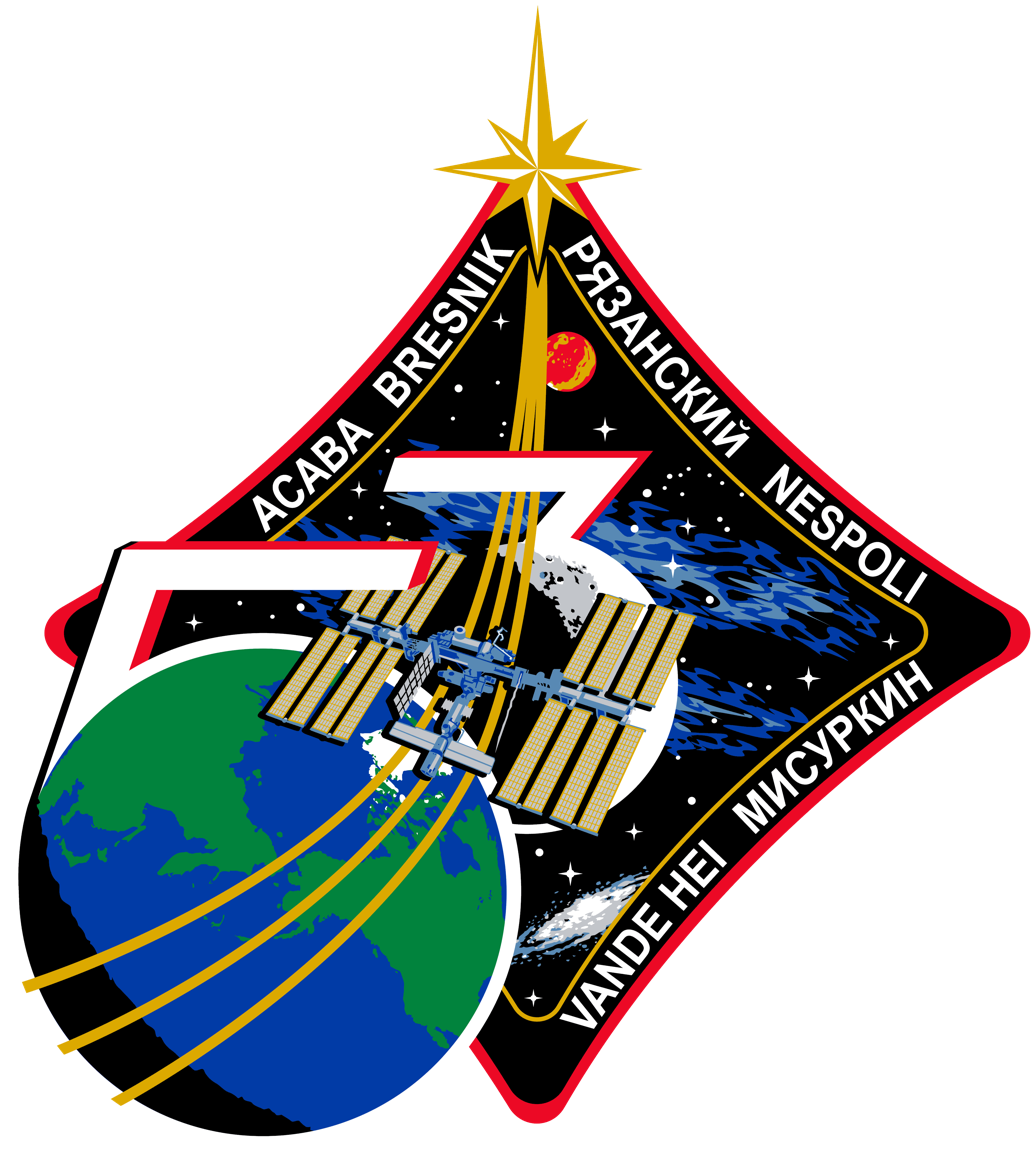
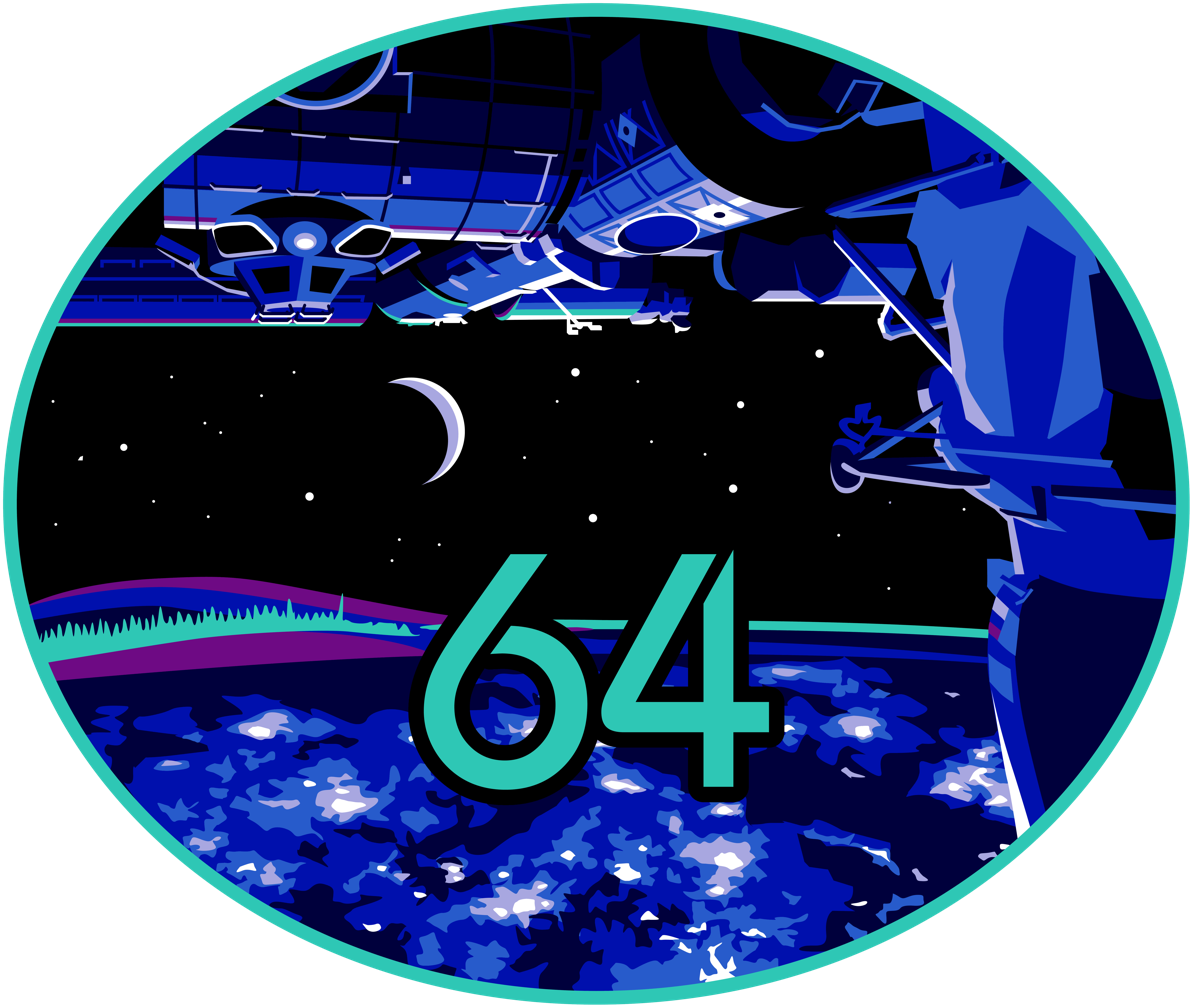
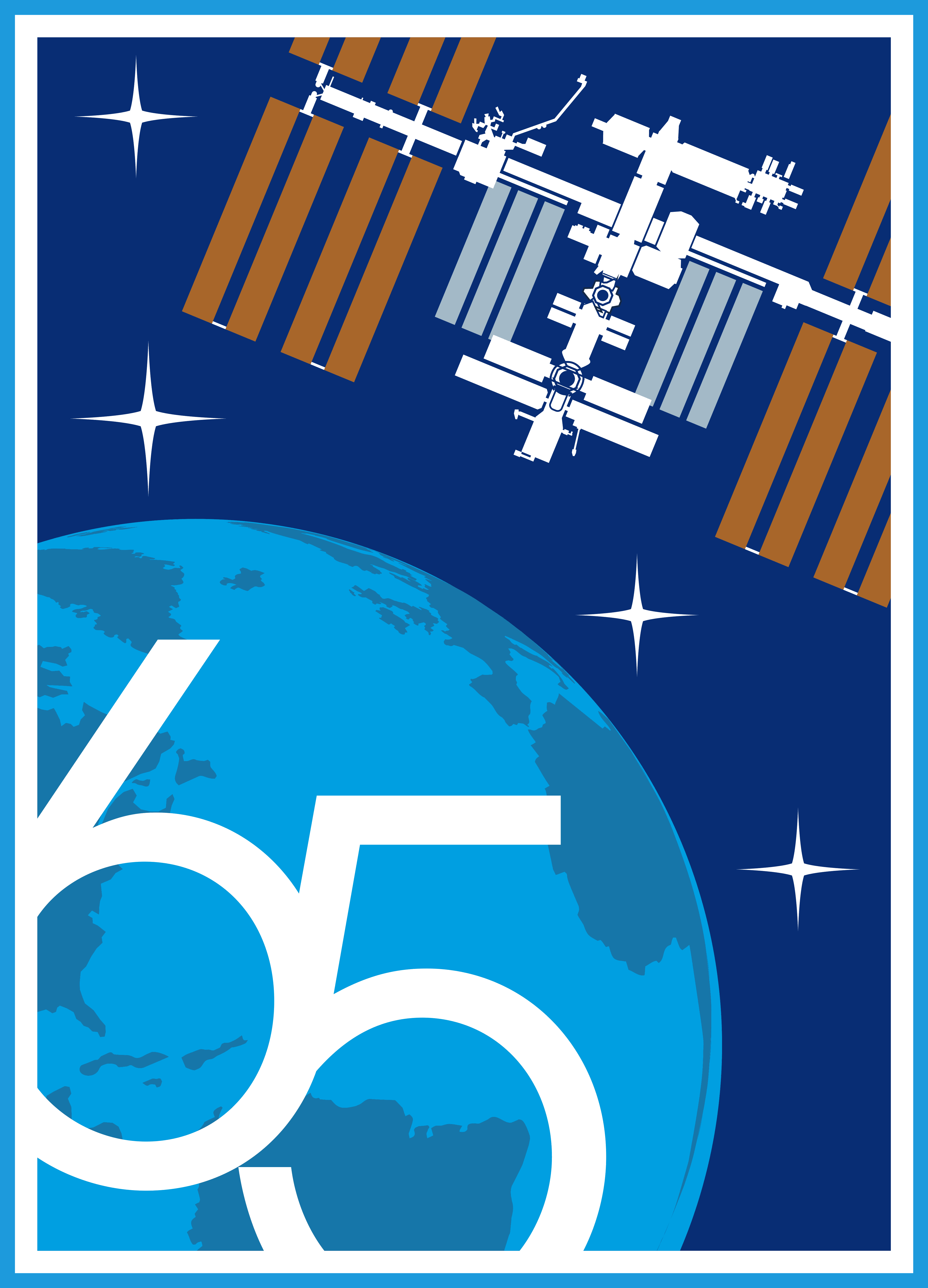
- Mission insignia

Mark Thomas Vande Hei (born November 10, 1966) is a retired United States Army officer and current NASA astronaut who has served as a flight engineer for Expedition 53, 54, 64, 65, and 66 on the International Space Station.

== Early life and education ==
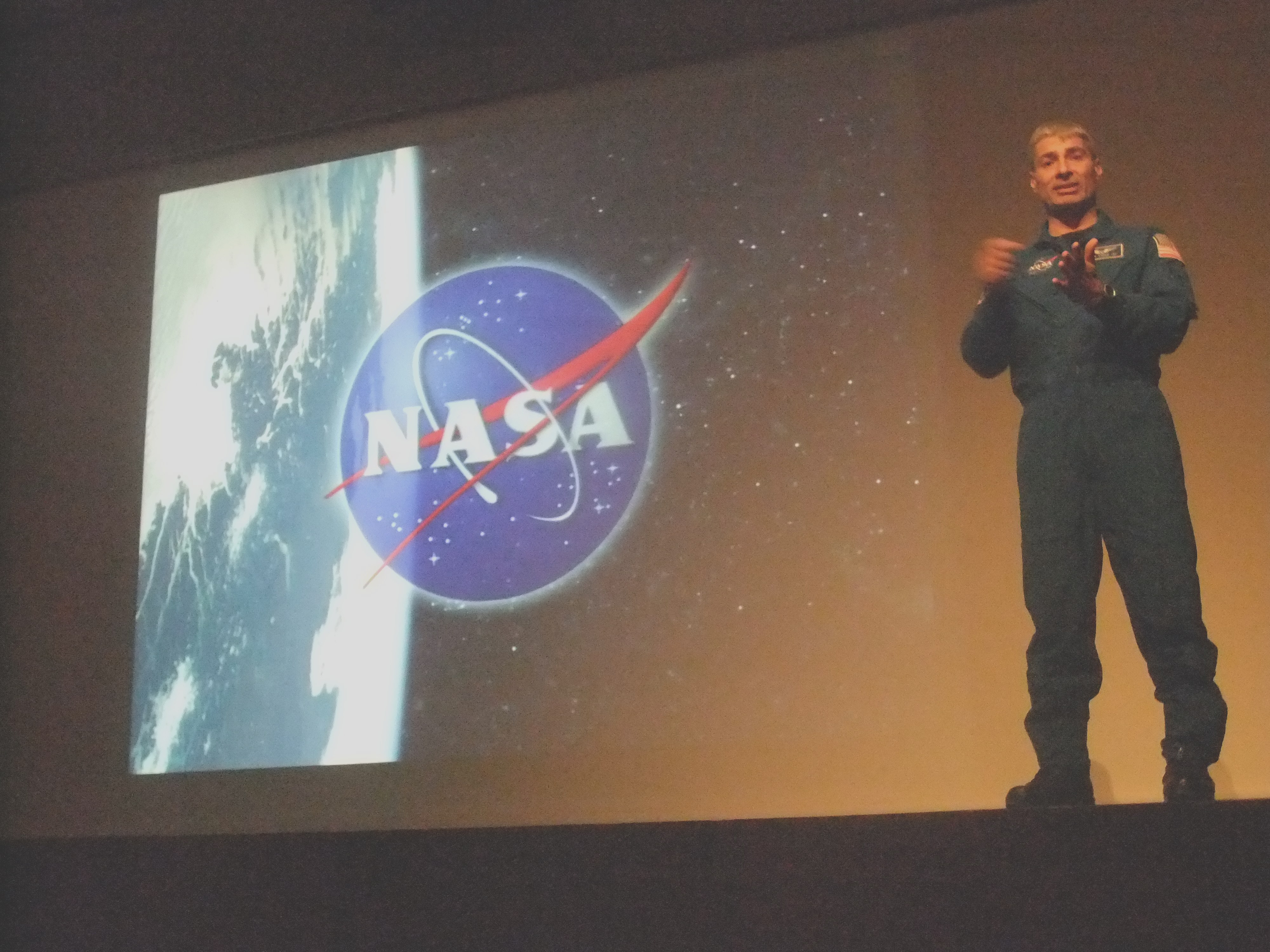
Vande Hei giving a talk at the College of St. Benedict / St. John's University in 2012

Mark Thomas Vande Hei was born on November 10, 1966, in Falls Church, Virginia to Dutch parents. He graduated from Benilde-St. Margaret's High School in Saint Louis Park, Minnesota, in 1985. Vande Hei earned a Bachelor of Science degree with a major in Physics from Saint John's University in 1989, and a Master of Science degree in Applied Physics from Stanford University in 1999.

== Military career ==
Vande Hei was commissioned in the U.S. Army through the ROTC program in 1989 and became a combat engineer, serving in Iraq in Operation Provide Comfort. After earning his master's degree in 1999, he became an assistant professor of physics at the United States Military Academy in West Point. In 2003, he became part of the Army's 1st Space Battalion at Peterson Air Force Base. Vande Hei again served in Iraq in Operation Iraqi Freedom. He retired in October 2016 at the rank of colonel.

== NASA career ==
Vande Hei began working at Johnson Space Center in 2006 as part of the U.S. Army contingent there. He worked as a communications officer (which is a flight controller responsible for communicating with astronauts in space) for the International Space Station. In June 2009, Vande Hei was selected as a member of the NASA Astronaut Group 20 and he completed astronaut candidate training in June 2011.

On June 10, 2014, NASA announced that Vande Hei would serve as an aquanaut aboard the Aquarius underwater laboratory during the NEEMO 18 undersea exploration mission, which began on July 21, 2014, and lasted nine days.

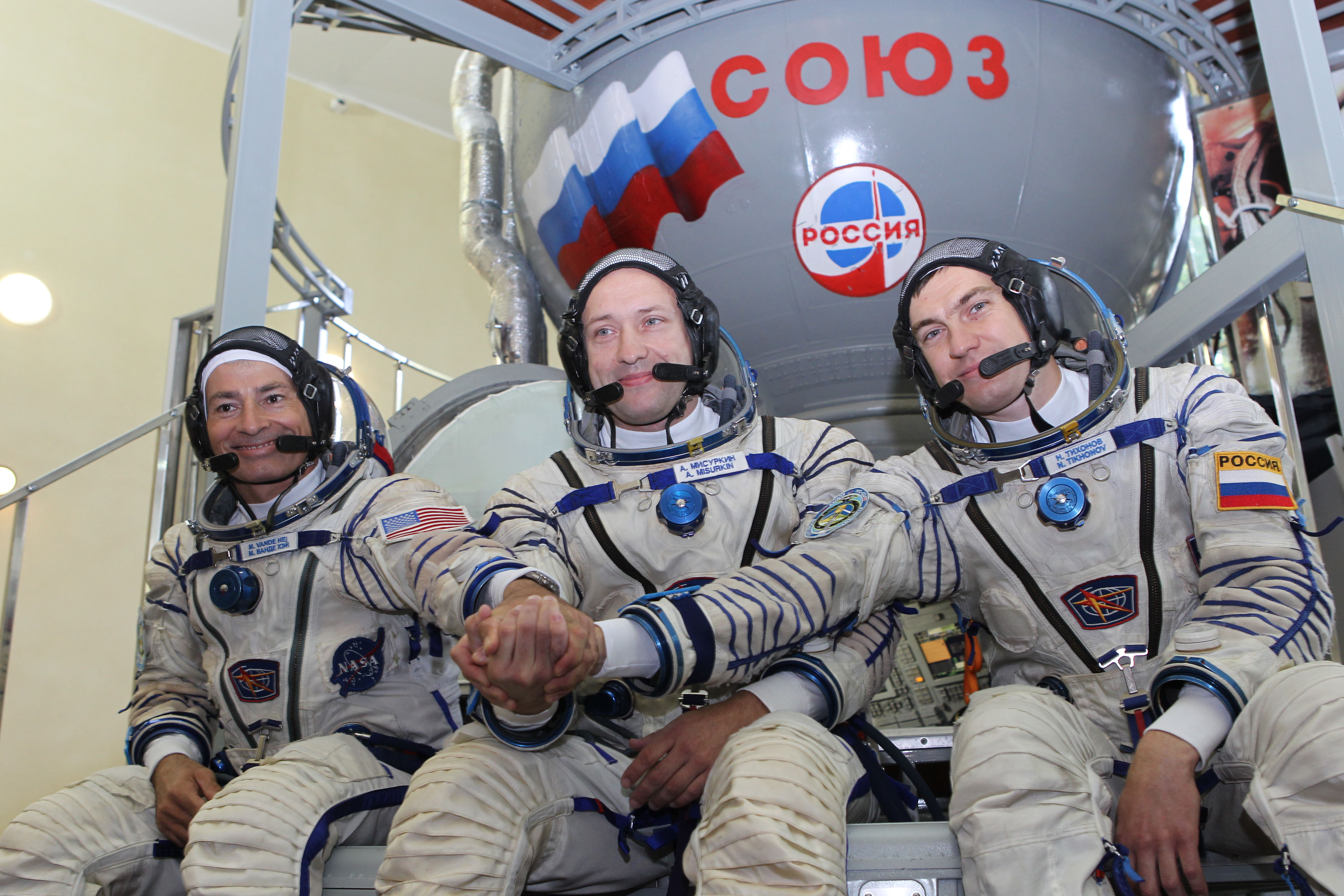
Vande Hei, Alexander Misurkin and Nikolai Tikhonov as part of the Soyuz MS-02 backup crew in Star City, Russia

In May 2015, it was announced that he had been assigned to ISS Expedition 51/52 scheduled to launch in March 2017 aboard Soyuz MS-04. He was reassigned in November 2016 to ISS Expedition 53/54 scheduled to launch in 2017 aboard Soyuz MS-06.

=== Expedition 53/54 ===
Vande Hei launched to space as part of Expedition 53/54 on Soyuz MS-06 on September 12, 2017. After launch the crew performed the fast rendezvous with the ISS and docked automatically after approximately 6 hours.

On October 5, 2017, Vande Hei performed his first spacewalk, along with commander Randy Bresnik. The spacewalk replaced the gripping mechanism on Canadarm2, the latching end effector A, or LEE-A. The duration was 6 hours and 55 minutes. On October 10, 2017, they completed the second EVA of the mission. They lubricated the newly installed end effector and replaced cameras, and the duration was 6 hours and 26 minutes.

The expedition ended on February 27, 2018, at 9:31 p.m. EST with Vande Hei's, Bresnik's, and third crew member Joseph M. Acaba's successful landing back on Earth.

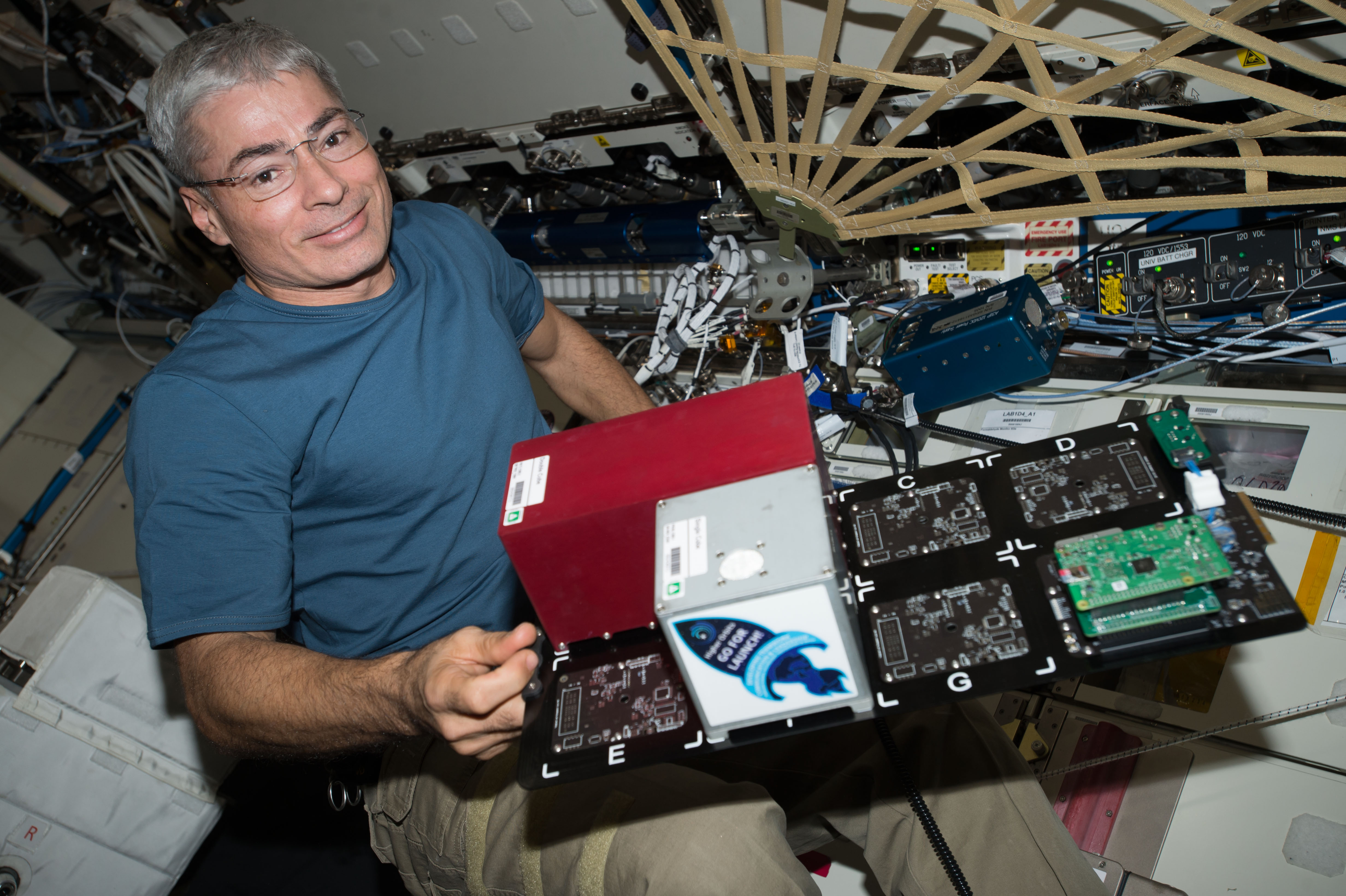
Vande Hei in the Destiny laboratory onboard the ISS

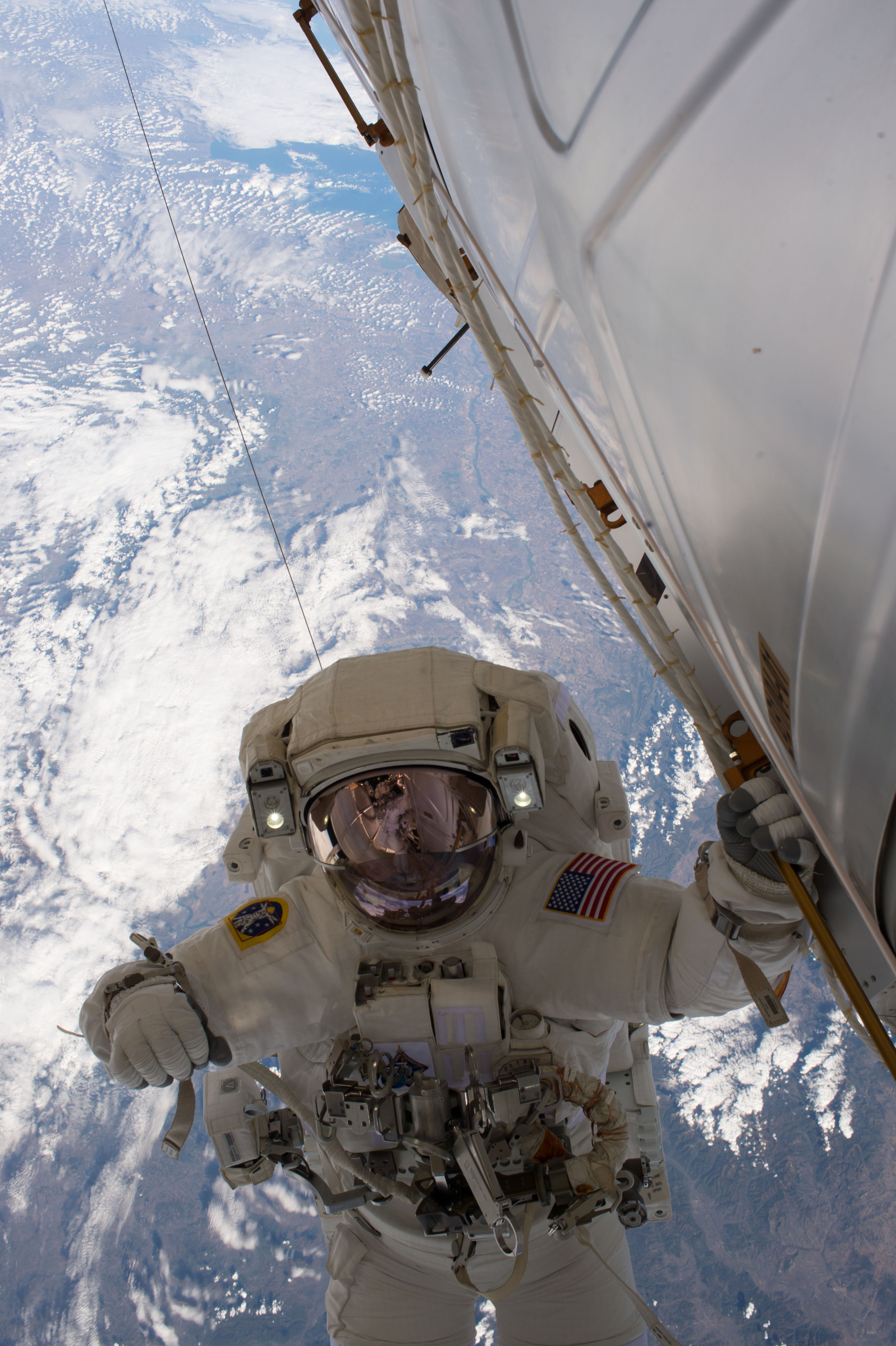
Vande Hei during an EVA in 2017

=== Expedition 64/65/66 ===
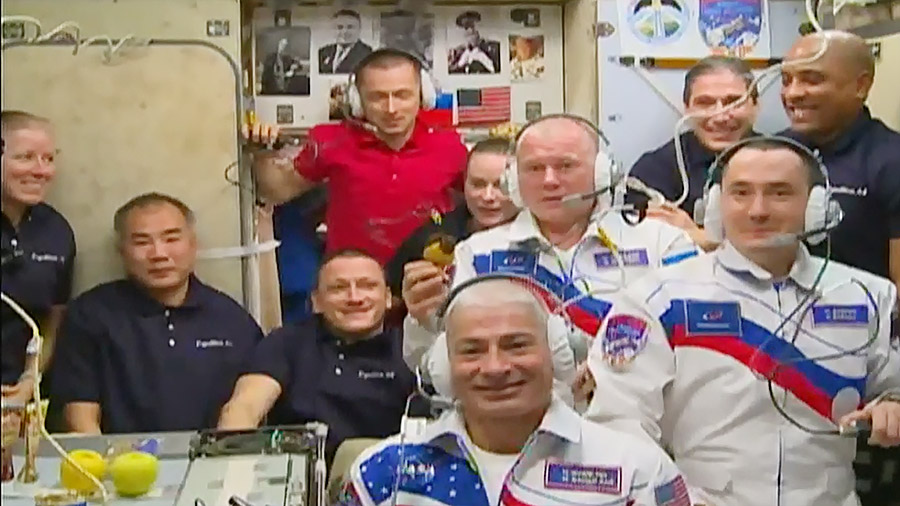
Mark’s arrival during Expedition 64

In March 2021 it was confirmed that Vande Hei would be making a second spaceflight, as a flight engineer onboard Soyuz MS-18, and be part of ISS Expedition 64/65. On April 9, 2021, Vande Hei alongside Roscosmos cosmonauts Oleg Novitsky and Pyotr Dubrov successfully launched onboard Soyuz MS-18 at 3:42 am EDT.

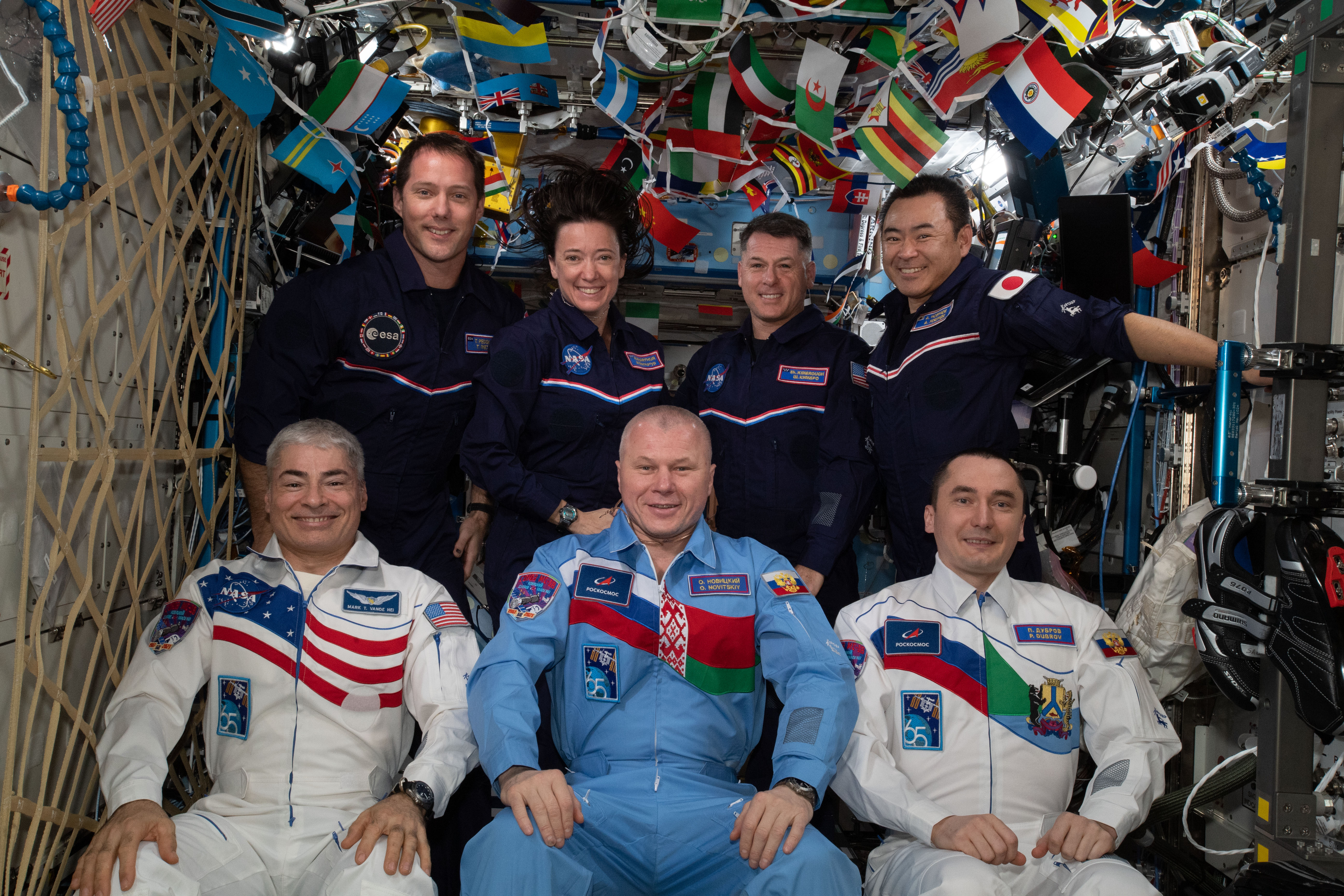
Mark during Expedition 65 playing Space Olympics

On September 14, 2021, it was announced that Vande Hei and Pyotr Dubrov had their six-month stays on the station extended by another six months. This means Vande Hei broke the record for the longest spaceflight by an American astronaut with 355 days. Later, Francisco Rubio broke his record with a total of 371 days in September 2023.

Two weeks of technical and weather delays, together with Crew-2 approaching the maximum on-orbit duration of their Crew Dragon craft, forced a highly undesirable “indirect handover”. As such, Crew-2 departed the station on November 8, 2021, whilst Crew-3 launched three days later and arrived safely at the sprawling orbital outpost on November 11, 2021. In this instance, there was no absence of U.S. personnel since NASA’s Mark Vande Hei was still on ISS. But had he not been aboard, the indirect handover of USOS operations from Crew-2 to Crew-3 might have left an unwanted gap in U.S. station crewing.

On January 6, 2022, Hei and Dubrov completed 273 days on ISS, surpassing Andrew R. Morgan‘s record of 272 days on-board. Shortly before his return to Earth, he passed 340 days in space, surpassing Scott Kelly as the record holder for the longest American spaceflight.

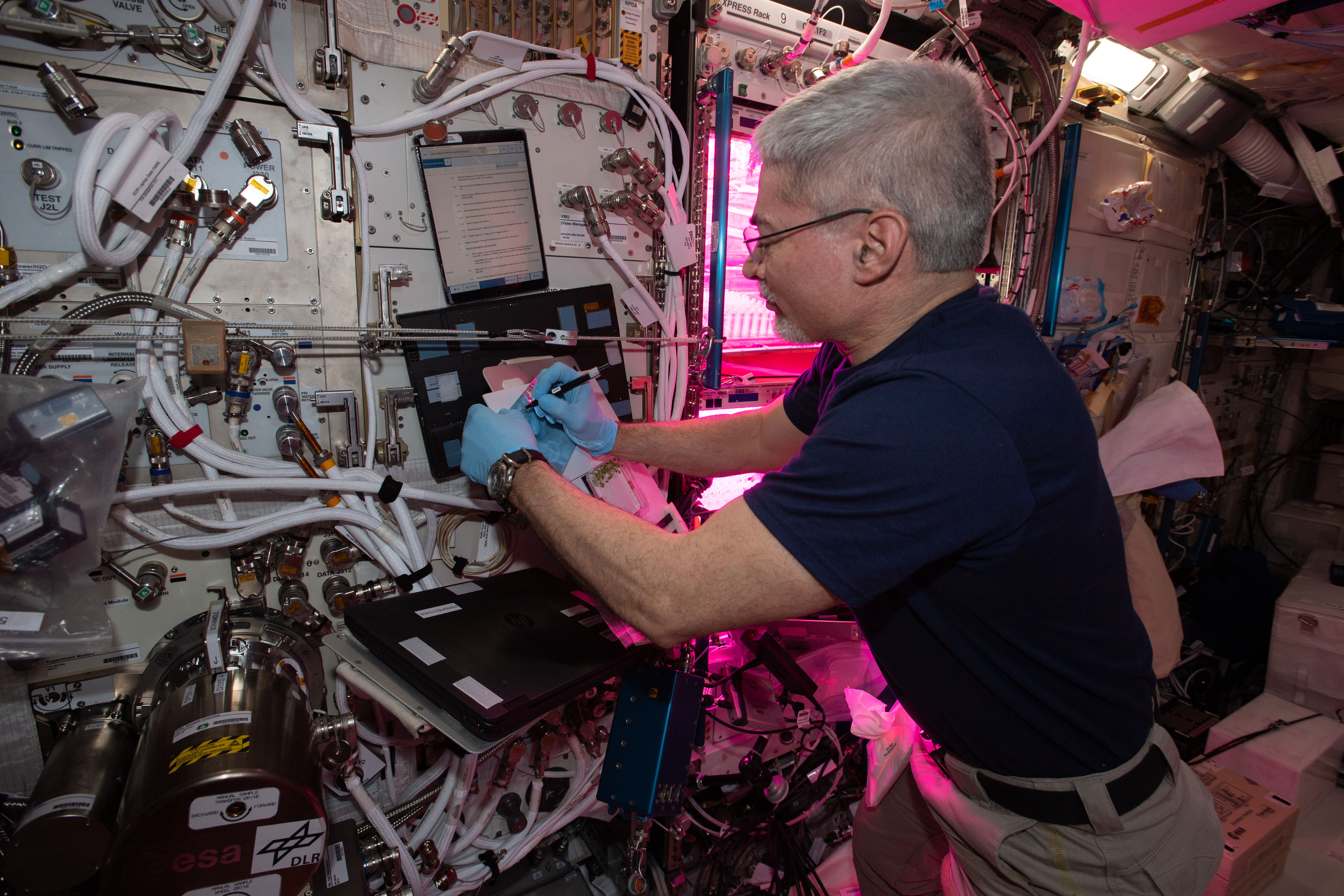
Astronaut Mark Vande Hei harvests plants grown on petri plates during Expedition 66

He returned to Earth with Soyuz MS-19 on March 30, 2022, having spent a total of 355 days in space on a mission to better observe the effects of long-duration spaceflight on humans.

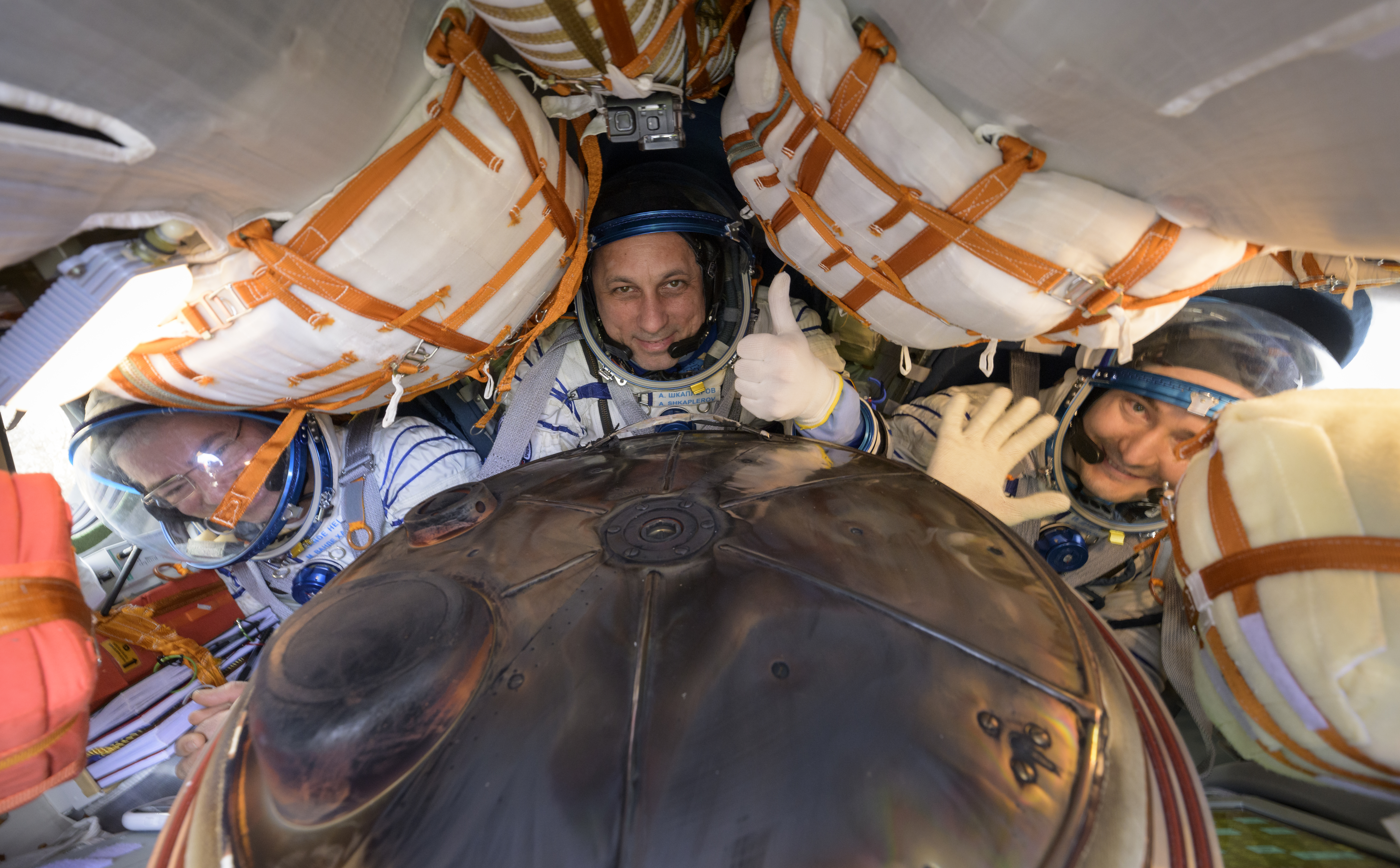
Mark on Soyuz MS-19 landing

==== Return ====
On March 10, 2022, Dmitry Rogozin posted a video on social media threatening to abandon Vande Hei on the ISS in retaliation against American sanctions on Russia's high tech imports that were placed upon Russia after the Russian invasion of Ukraine. He landed as planned on March 30.

Six months after returning from his 355 days in space, Mark returned to his high school, Benilde-St. Margaret's on September 23, 2022. During the 2015-2016 school year, two students from Benilde-St. Margaret's were chosen to give their student ID cards to Vande Hei so he could take the cards to space with him. Mark returned these IDs when at the school. A representative for Minnesota Governor Tim Walz declared September 23, 2022 to be Mark Vande Hei Day in Minnesota. Brian Bruess, the president of the College of Saint Benedict and Saint John's University, also came to congratulate Vande Hei.

== Personal life ==
He was born in Virginia and raised in New Jersey and Minnesota. He is married to Julie Vande Hei and has two children.

== Cinematography ==
On May 14, 2021, the Interagency Committee approved the composition of the ISS main and alternate crews for the period 2021-2023. Cosmonaut Anton Shkaplerov (commander) and the crew of the film The Challenge: actress Yulia Peresild and director Klim Shipenko went to the ISS onboard Soyuz MS-19. The drama is a joint project of Roscosmos, Channel One and the Yellow, Black and White studio.

The director and actress returned to Earth on October 17, 2021 on Soyuz MS-18 with commander Oleg Novitskiy. Pyotr Dubrov and Mark Vande Hei, who arrived at the ISS on Soyuz MS-18, joined Shkaplerov on the landing of Soyuz MS-19 on March 30, 2022.

Klim Shipenko shot about 35–40 minutes of film on the ISS, as well as taking on the position of director, operator, art director, and makeup artist. Oleg Novitsky and Pyotr Dubrov will appear in the film, with Dubrov and Mark Vande Hei assisting in the production.
