= Oleg Artemyev =

Russian cosmonaut (born 1970)

- Олег Артемьев
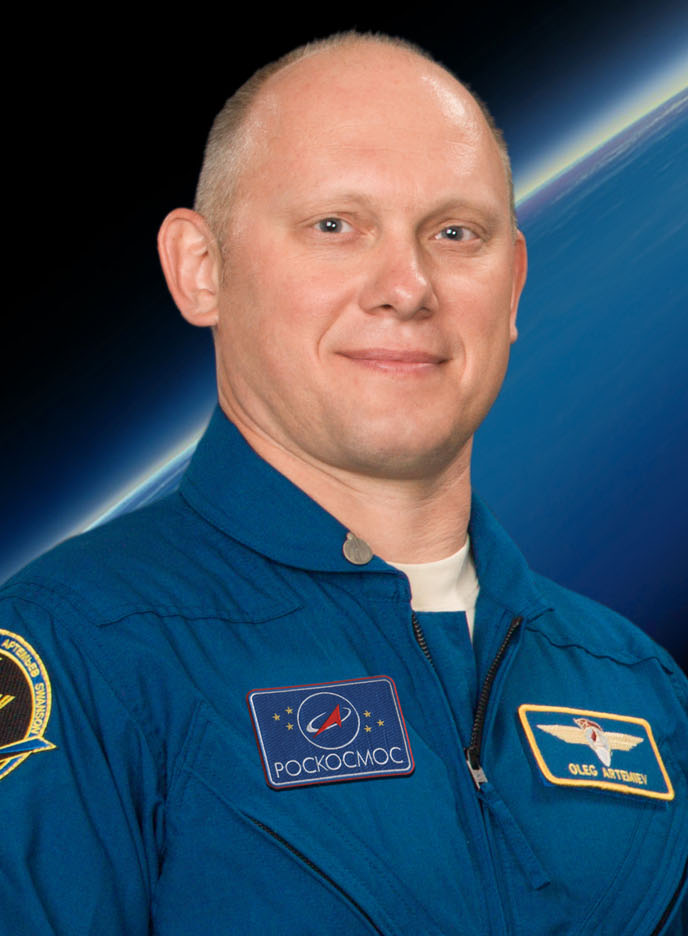
- Artemyev in 2014
- Born: Oleg Germanovich Artemyev; December 28, 1970 (age 55); Riga, Latvian SSR, Soviet Union
- Education: Bauman Moscow State Technical University
- Spouse: Anna Sergeevna Malikhova
- Space career

Roscosmos cosmonaut
- Current occupation: Test cosmonaut
- Status: Retired
- Time in space: 560 days, 18 hours and 6 minutes
- Selection: RKKE-15 Cosmonaut Group (2003)
- Total EVAs: 8
- Total EVA time: 53 hours and 32 minutes
- Missions: Soyuz TMA-12M (Expedition 39/40); Soyuz MS-08 (Expedition 55/56); Soyuz MS-21 (Expedition 66/67)
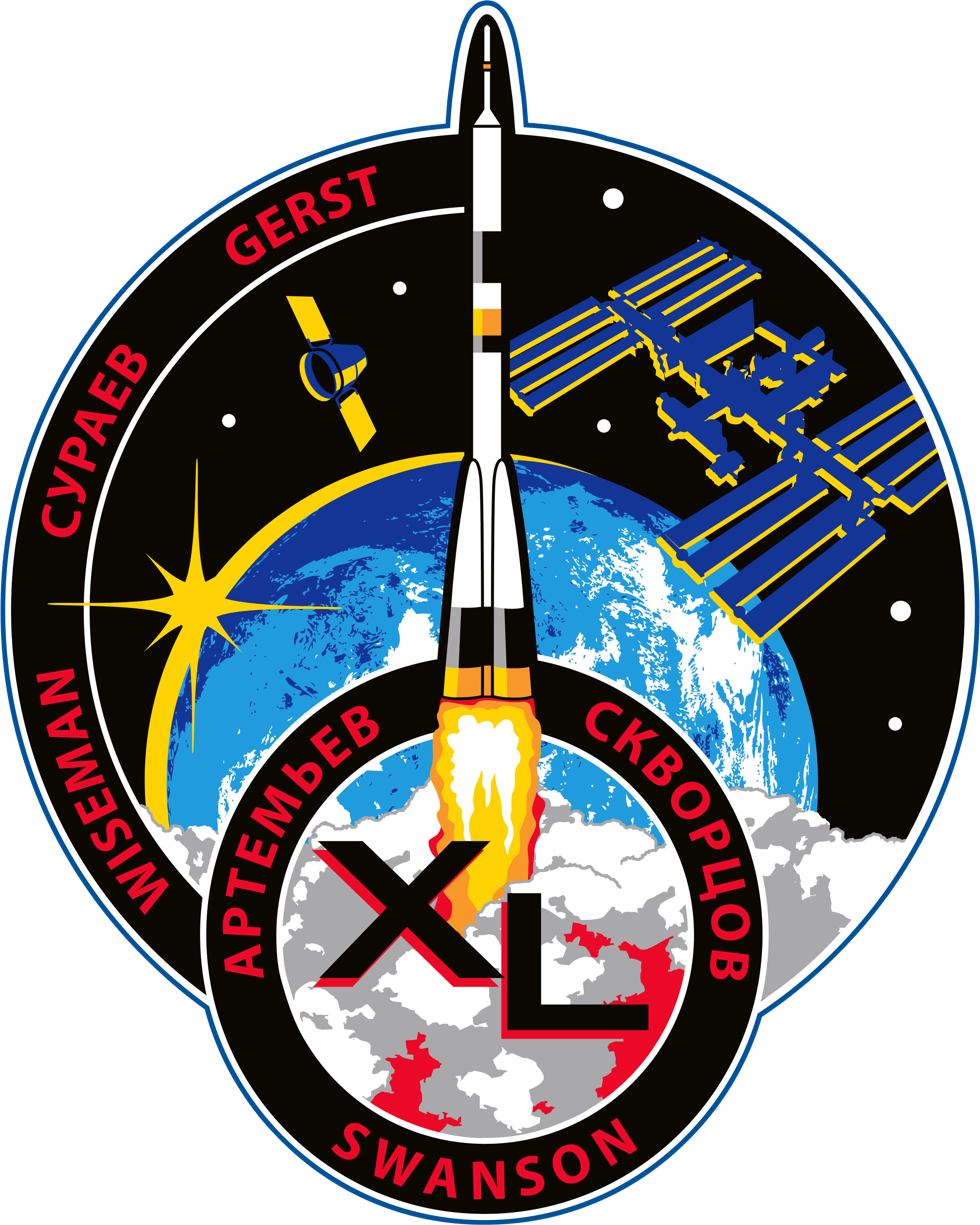
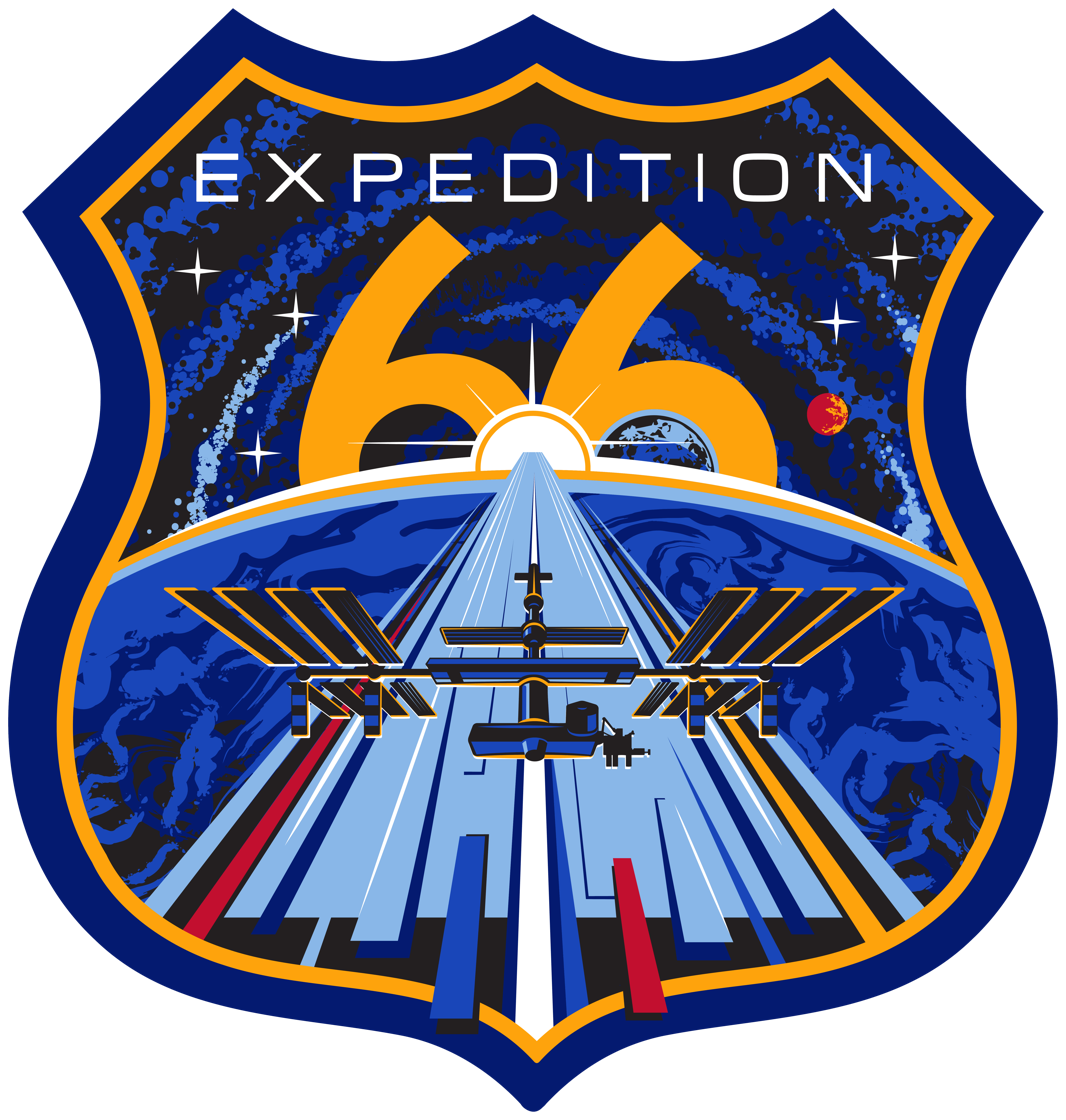
- Mission insignia
- Retired: 24 July 2026
- Website: www.artemjew.ru

Oleg Germanovich Artemyev (Russian: Олег Германович Артемьев; born December 28, 1970) is a former Russian cosmonaut for the Russian Federal Space Agency. He was selected as part of the RKKE-15 Cosmonaut group in 2003. He was a flight engineer of Expedition 39 and 40 to the International Space Station. In 2018, he returned to space as the commander of Soyuz MS-08, and in 2022, he returned to space as the commander of Soyuz MS-21.

== Personal life and education ==
Artemyev was born in Riga, Latvian Soviet Socialist Republic, present-day Latvia, on December 28, 1970, and grew up in Leninsk (now Baikonur), Kazakhstan.

He graduated from the Tallinn Polytechnical School in 1990. In 1998, he graduated from Bauman Moscow State Technical University with a degree in Low Temperature Technology and Physics. Artemyev graduated from the Russian Academy of State Service under the President of the Russian Federation in 2009, specializing in Personnel Management.

He is married to Anna Sergeevna Malikhova.

== Career ==
After his graduation, Artemyev served in the Soviet Army in Vilnius, Lithuania, until 1991. He has worked at RKKE since 1998. At RKKE he was involving in developing testing procedures for extravehicular activity (EVA) equipment in neutral buoyancy at the hydrodynamics laboratory, Yuri Gagarin Cosmonaut Training Center. Artemyev was a member of the pre-launch processing team of the Zvezda Service Module working on the EVA and teleoperation control system. In 2000, he received medical clearance to begin special training related to space flight operation.

== Cosmonaut career ==
Artemyev was selected as part of the RKKE-15 Cosmonaut group on May 29, 2003. In the following years, he entered Soyuz and ISS specific training. In 2006, together with American astronauts Michael Barratt and Sandra Magnus, Artemyev completed survival training as part of Soyuz training procedures. Again in June 2006, Artemyev, Yuri Lonchakov and Oleg Skripochka completed emergency water training in Sevastopol followed by another session of survival training with Sergei Revin and space tourist Charles Simony in January 2007. In 2008, he was part of a testing campaign of the Orlan-MK space suit.

As part of the Soyuz Processing Team, Artemyev worked at the Baikonur Cosmodrome in 2010 and 2011. He was the descent module operator for the Soyuz TMA-01M mission. He also processed the Soyuz TMA-21 spacecraft that launched in 2011.

Artemyev also has a personal vlog on YouTube where he films the daily life on the ISS.

=== MARS-500 ===
Artemyev was a crew member in the 15-day and 105-day precursor studies of the MARS-500 program between 2007 and 2009.

=== Expedition 39/40 ===
Artemyev was a member of the Expedition 39/40 long-duration International Space Station crew. The mission launched on a Soyuz rocket from the Baikonur Cosmodrome, Kazakhstan, on March 25, 2014, and returned to Earth on September 11, 2014.

=== Expedition 55/56 ===
Artemyev launched on March 21, 2018 as part of Expedition 55/56. He was the commander of Soyuz MS-08. He returned to Earth on October 5, 2018.

=== Expedition 66/67 ===
Artemyev launched for the third time on March 18, 2022 onboard Soyuz MS-21. He joined the International Space Station Expedition 66 and became part of the Expedition 67 crew. Later in Expedition 67, he assumed command of the International Space Station from NASA astronaut Thomas Marshburn on 5 May 2022. He spent 195 days in space before returning to Earth on 29 September 2022 at 10:57 UTC.

During Expedition 67, Artemyev participated in educational and cultural outreach activities aboard the International Space Station, including presenting Mohabishwer Mohakash Fari, a Bengali-language book by Shah Jalal Jonak that was described by media outlets as the first Bengali-language book sent to the ISS.

=== SpaceX Crew-12 ===
In early 2025, Artemyev was assigned as the backup to Oleg Platonov for the SpaceX Crew-11 mission, with the expectation that he would fly on the Crew-12 mission in early 2026. This assignment made him the first veteran cosmonaut slated to fly on the SpaceX Crew Dragon; all previous Russian crew members on the spacecraft had been first-time spaceflight participants.

In December 2025, about two and a half months before launch, Artemyev was abruptly removed from the Crew-12 mission, with Roscosmos officially citing his "transition to other work". However, the investigative news site The Insider reported that he was expelled from the United States after being accused of violating the International Traffic in Arms Regulations by photographing SpaceX engines, documents, and other technologies with his phone and then using that phone to "export" that information. The alleged violation occurred at SpaceX's Hawthorne, California, facility in late November and prompted an interagency investigation.

Artemyev was replaced by cosmonaut Andrey Fedyaev, who became the first Russian to fly twice on Crew Dragon, reducing the amount of additional training required.

Artemyev retired from Roscosmos on July 24, 2026.

== See also ==
- List of Heroes of the Russian Federation

Preceded by Thomas Marshburn	ISS Commander (Expedition 67); 4 May to 28 September 2022	Succeeded by Samantha Cristoforetti
