= Soyuz TMA-M =

Revision of the Soyuz spacecraft

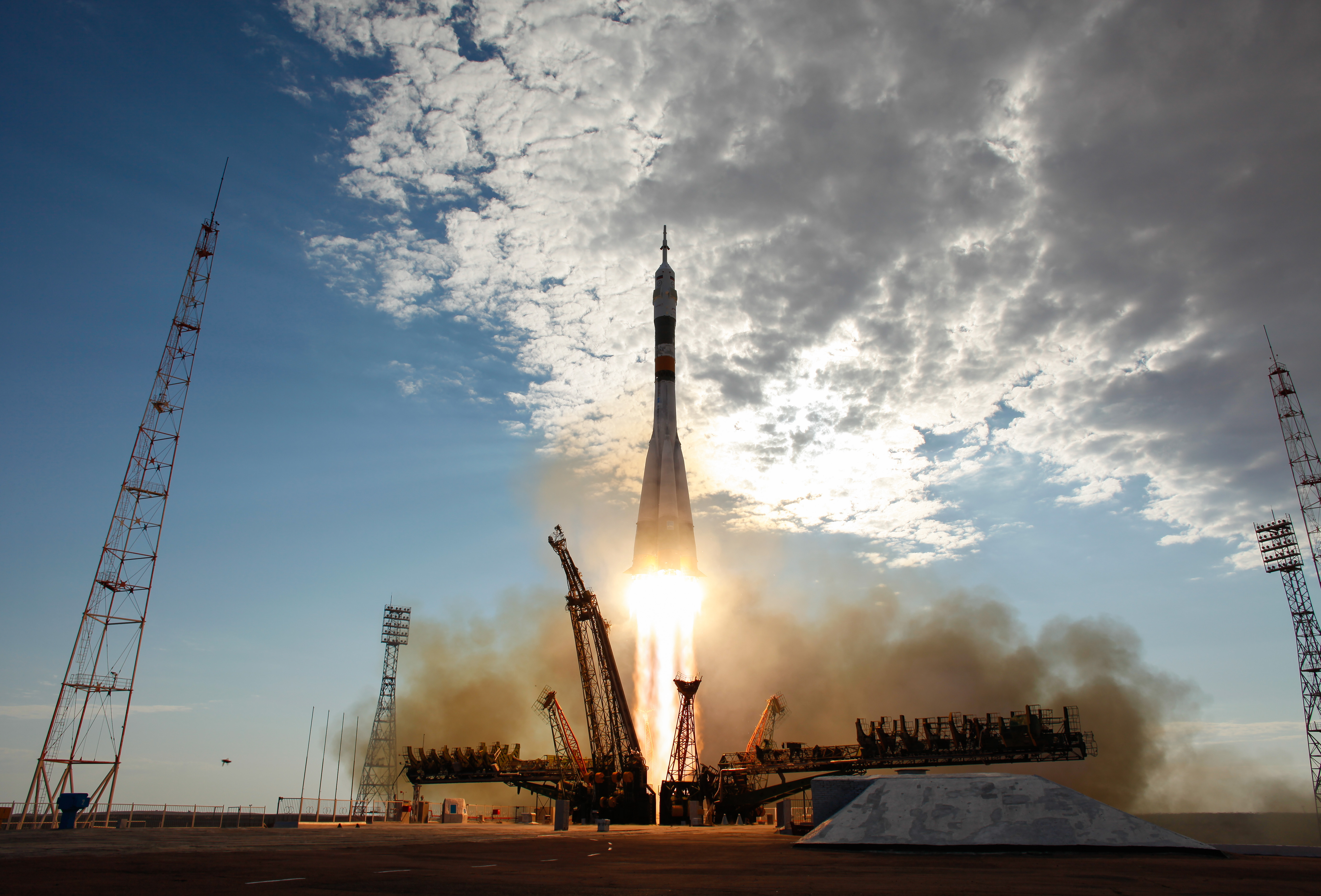
- Manufacturer: Energia
- Country of origin: Russia
- Operator: Roscosmos
- Applications: ISS crew transport

Specifications
- Regime: Low Earth orbit
- Design life: Up to six months docked to ISS

Production
- Status: Retired
- Launched: 20
- Maiden launch: 7 October 2010 (Soyuz TMA-01M)
- Last launch: 18 March 2016 (Soyuz TMA-20M)

Related spacecraft
- Derived from: Soyuz TMA
- Derivatives: Soyuz MS
- Flown with: Progress M-M (cargo version)
- Launch vehicle: Soyuz FG

The Soyuz TMA-M was a spacecraft developed by Energia and operated by Roscosmos for human spaceflight. Introduced in 2010, it was a revision of the Soyuz spacecraft with modernizations (the '-M' in the name) over its predecessor, the Soyuz TMA, primarily to the main flight computer and avionics. It flew a total of 20 missions from 2010 to 2016, all carrying astronauts to the International Space Station (ISS). It was replaced by the Soyuz MS, which introduced further modernized systems.

== Design ==
The primary difference between the Soyuz TMA-M and the earlier Soyuz TMA was the removal of several pieces of outdated equipment, many of which were no longer in production. These included the 70-kilogram (150 lb) main digital computer, called Argon, and its analogue avionics. They were replaced with a new digital computer, the TsVM-101 and digital avionics.

There were also changes to the spacecraft's structure, such as replacing the magnesium alloy used in the instrument module frame with an aluminium alloy, for easier manufacture. In combination, the changes reduced the vehicle's total mass by 70 kilograms (150 lb). Additionally, power consumption was reduced throughout the ship, improving its overall efficiency.

== Flights ==
Two development flights were launched: Soyuz TMA-01M on Oct 7, 2010 and Soyuz TMA-02M on Jun 7, 2011. NASA astronaut Scott Kelly, who flew on TMA-01M, praised the spacecraft's new digital displays, noting that they made flying easier and less demanding.

The third mission, Soyuz TMA-03M, launched on 21 December 2011 and was used for qualification tests. In addition to verifying the nominal operation of the spaceship, the testing included verification of off-nominal modes, such as manual attitude control, issuing of orbital manoeuvring pulses using four berthing and attitude thrusters, and flying around the ISS in manual control mode.

Thereafter the TMA-M entered regular service, where it was used for supply and crew rotation flights to the ISS. The TMA-M variant flew another 20 missions from 2012 to 2016, at a cadence of four times a year, all to the ISS. At that time, the Soyuz TMA-M was the only spacecraft in service that was capable of flying humans to the ISS, so ride-share agreements were in place with other space agencies. All launches carried three astronauts – there were always one or two Russians (from Roscosmos) and one American (from NASA). Half the launches included one astronaut from Europe (ESA), Canada (CSA) or Japan (JAXA).

Mission	Launch Vehicle	Crew		Notes	Duration
Mission	Launch Vehicle	Launch	Landing	Notes	Duration
Soyuz TMA-01M	Soyuz-FG	(Russia) Aleksandr Kaleri (Russia) Oleg Skripochka (United States) Scott Kelly		Delivered Expedition 25/26 crew to ISS.	159 days
Soyuz TMA-02M	Soyuz-FG	(Russia) Sergey Volkov (United States) Michael E. Fossum (Japan) Satoshi Furukawa		Delivered Expedition 28/29 crew to ISS.	166 days
Soyuz TMA-03M	Soyuz-FG	(Russia) Oleg Kononenko (Netherlands) André Kuipers (United States) Donald Pettit		Delivered Expedition 30/31 crew to ISS.	192 days
Soyuz TMA-04M	Soyuz-FG	(Russia) Gennady Padalka (Russia) Sergey Revin (United States) Joseph M. Acaba		Delivered Expedition 31/32 crew to ISS.	124 days
Soyuz TMA-05M	Soyuz-FG	(Russia) Yuri Malenchenko (United States) Sunita Williams (Japan) Akihiko Hoshide		Delivered Expedition 32/33 crew to ISS.	126 days
Soyuz TMA-06M	Soyuz-FG	(Russia) Oleg Novitsky (Russia) Yevgeny Tarelkin (United States) Kevin A. Ford		Delivered Expedition 33/34 crew to ISS.	143 days
Soyuz TMA-07M	Soyuz-FG	(Russia) Roman Romanenko (Canada) Chris Hadfield (United States) Thomas Marshburn		Delivered Expedition 34/35 crew to ISS.	145 days
Soyuz TMA-08M	Soyuz-FG	(Russia) Pavel Vinogradov (Russia) Alexander Misurkin (United States) Christopher Cassidy		Delivered Expedition 35/36 crew to ISS.	166 days
Soyuz TMA-09M	Soyuz-FG	(Russia) Fyodor Yurchikhin (United States) Karen Nyberg (Italy) Luca Parmitano		Delivered Expedition 36/37 crew to ISS.	166 days
Soyuz TMA-10M	Soyuz-FG	(Russia) Oleg Kotov (Russia) Sergey Ryazansky (United States) Mike Hopkins		Delivered Expedition 37/38 crew to ISS.	166 days
Soyuz TMA-11M	Soyuz-FG	(Russia) Mikhail Tyurin (United States) Richard Mastracchio (Japan) Koichi Wakata		Delivered Expedition 38/39 crew to ISS.	187 days
Soyuz TMA-12M	Soyuz-FG	(Russia) Aleksandr Skvortsov (Russia) Oleg Artemyev (United States) Steven Swanson		Delivered Expedition 39/40 crew to ISS.	169 days
Soyuz TMA-13M	Soyuz-FG	(Russia) Maksim Surayev (United States) Reid Wiseman (Germany) Alexander Gerst		Delivered Expedition 40/41 crew to ISS.	165 days
Soyuz TMA-14M	Soyuz-FG	(Russia) Aleksandr Samokutyaev (Russia) Yelena Serova (United States) Barry Wilmore		Delivered Expedition 41/42 crew to ISS.	167 days
Soyuz TMA-15M	Soyuz-FG	(Russia) Anton Shkaplerov (Italy) Samantha Cristoforetti (United States) Terry Virts		Delivered Expedition 42/43 crew to ISS.	199 days
Soyuz TMA-16M	Soyuz-FG	(Russia) Gennady Padalka (Russia) Mikhail Kornienko (United States) Scott Kelly	(Russia) Gennady Padalka (Denmark) Andreas Mogensen (Kazakhstan) Aidyn Aimbetov	Delivered Expedition 43/44 crew to ISS.	168 days
Soyuz TMA-17M	Soyuz-FG	(Russia) Oleg Kononenko (Japan) Kimiya Yui (United States) Kjell N. Lindgren		Delivered Expedition 44/45 crew to ISS.	141 days
Soyuz TMA-18M	Soyuz-FG	(Russia) Sergey Volkov (Denmark) Andreas Mogensen (Kazakhstan) Aidyn Aimbetov	(Russia) Sergey Volkov (Russia) Mikhail Kornienko (United States) Scott Kelly	Delivered Expedition 45/46 crew to ISS.	181 days
Soyuz TMA-19M	Soyuz-FG	(Russia) Yuri Malenchenko (United States) Timothy Kopra (United Kingdom) Tim Peake		Delivered Expedition 46/47 crew to ISS.	185 days
Soyuz TMA-20M	Soyuz-FG	(Russia) Aleksey Ovchinin (Russia) Oleg Skripochka (United States) Jeffrey Williams		Delivered Expedition 47/48 crew to ISS.	172 days

== Replacement ==
Further development of the Soyuz capsule design led to the introduction of the Soyuz MS in 2016, which replaced the Soyuz TMA-M.
