= Space Marathon (in space) =

Practice of running a marathon on the ISS

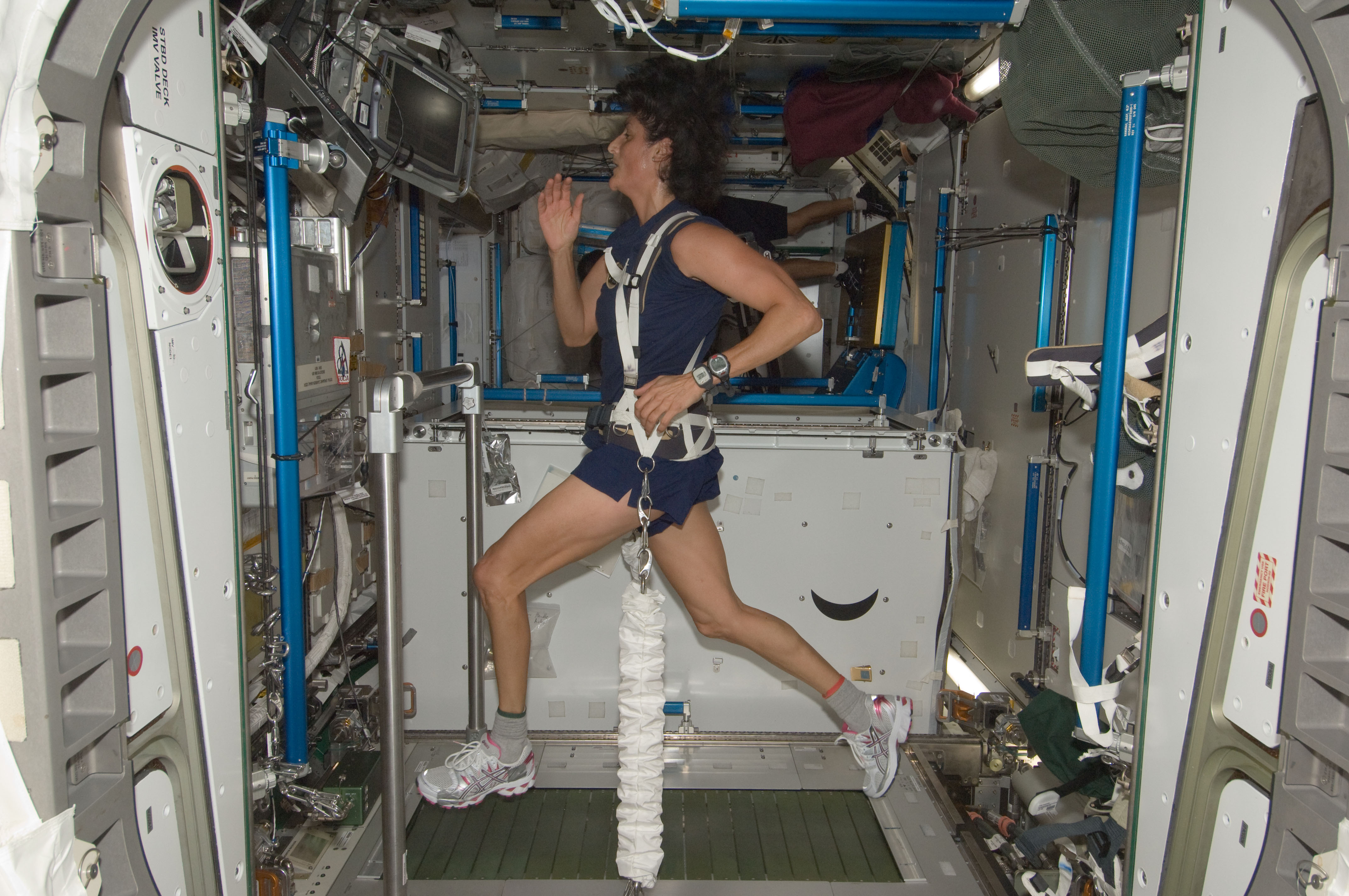
Sunita Williams running in space.

Space marathons are run by astronauts while in space. Space marathons are run on a treadmill in the International Space Station (ISS), using a harness to counteract the effects of weightlessness. Athletes in space must choose how much of an impact they want in each step and can adjust straps on their harness to keep them in place on their treadmill. The treadmill is designed to minimise impact on the space station’s structure. The exercise area needs good ventilation to prevent an accumulation of carbon dioxide around the runner.

== Space marathon runners ==
The first space marathon was completed by Sunita Williams in 2007 in conjunction with the Boston Marathon. The first man to complete a space marathon was Tim Peake in 2016 alongside the London Marathon.

Peake ran the 42 km (26.2 mi) distance in about three hours, 35 minutes. Williams completed the race in about four hours, 24 minutes.
