= Expedition 47 =

47th expedition to the International Space Station

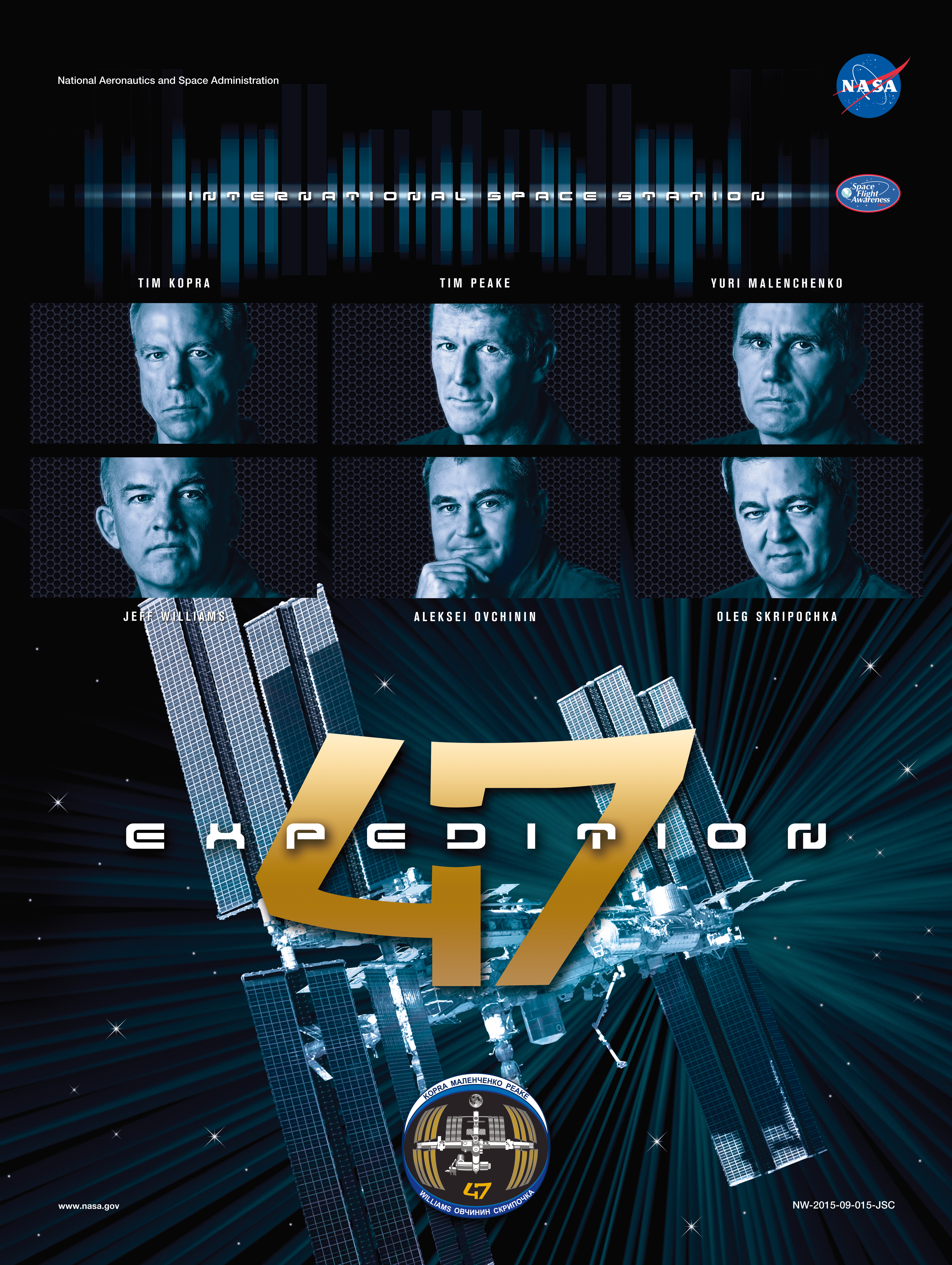
- Promotional Poster
- Mission type: Long-duration expedition

Expedition
- Space station: International Space Station
- Began: 2 March 2016 UTC
- Ended: 18 June 2016 UTC
- Arrived aboard: Soyuz TMA-19M; Soyuz TMA-20M
- Departed aboard: Soyuz TMA-19M; Soyuz TMA-20M

Crew
- Crew size: 6
- Members: Expedition 46/47: Yuri Malenchenko; Timothy N. Peake; Timothy L. Kopra Expedition 47/48: Aleksey Ovchinin; Oleg Skripochka; Jeffrey Williams
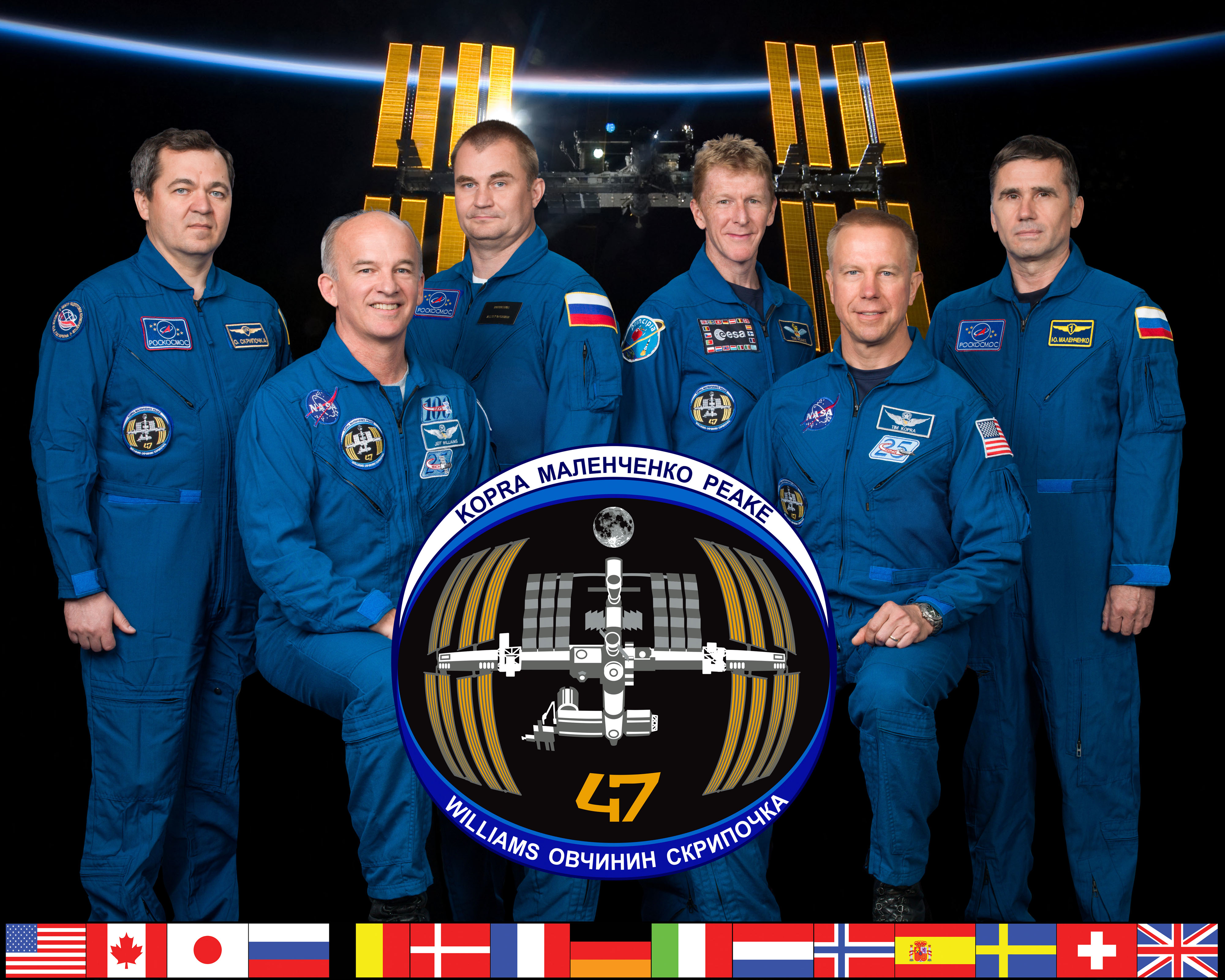
- Expedition 47 mission patch (l-r) Skripochka, Williams, Ovchinin, Peake, Kopra, Malenchenko ISS expeditions

Expedition 47 was the 47th expedition to the International Space Station.

Yuri Malenchenko, Timothy Peake and Timothy Kopra transferred from Expedition 46. Expedition 47 began upon the departure of Soyuz TMA-18M on 2 March 2016 and concluded upon the landing of Soyuz TMA-19M on 18 June 2016. The crew of Soyuz TMA-20M were then transferred to Expedition 48.

== Crew ==
Position	First Part (March 2016)	Second Part (March 2016 to June 2016)
Commander	Timothy L. Kopra, NASA; Second and last spaceflight	
Flight engineer	Timothy Peake, ESA; Only spaceflight	
Flight engineer	Yuri Malenchenko, RSA; Sixth and last spaceflight	
Flight engineer		Aleksey Ovchinin, RSA; First spaceflight
Flight engineer		Oleg Skripochka, RSA; Second spaceflight
Flight engineer		Jeffrey Williams, NASA; Fourth and last spaceflight

Source
Spacefacts

== Mission highlights ==
Launched on 8 April 2016, the SpaceX CRS-8 mission carried the Bigelow Expandable Activity Module to the ISS for two years of in-orbit habitat qualification.
