= Expedition 46 =

46th long duration stay in the International space station

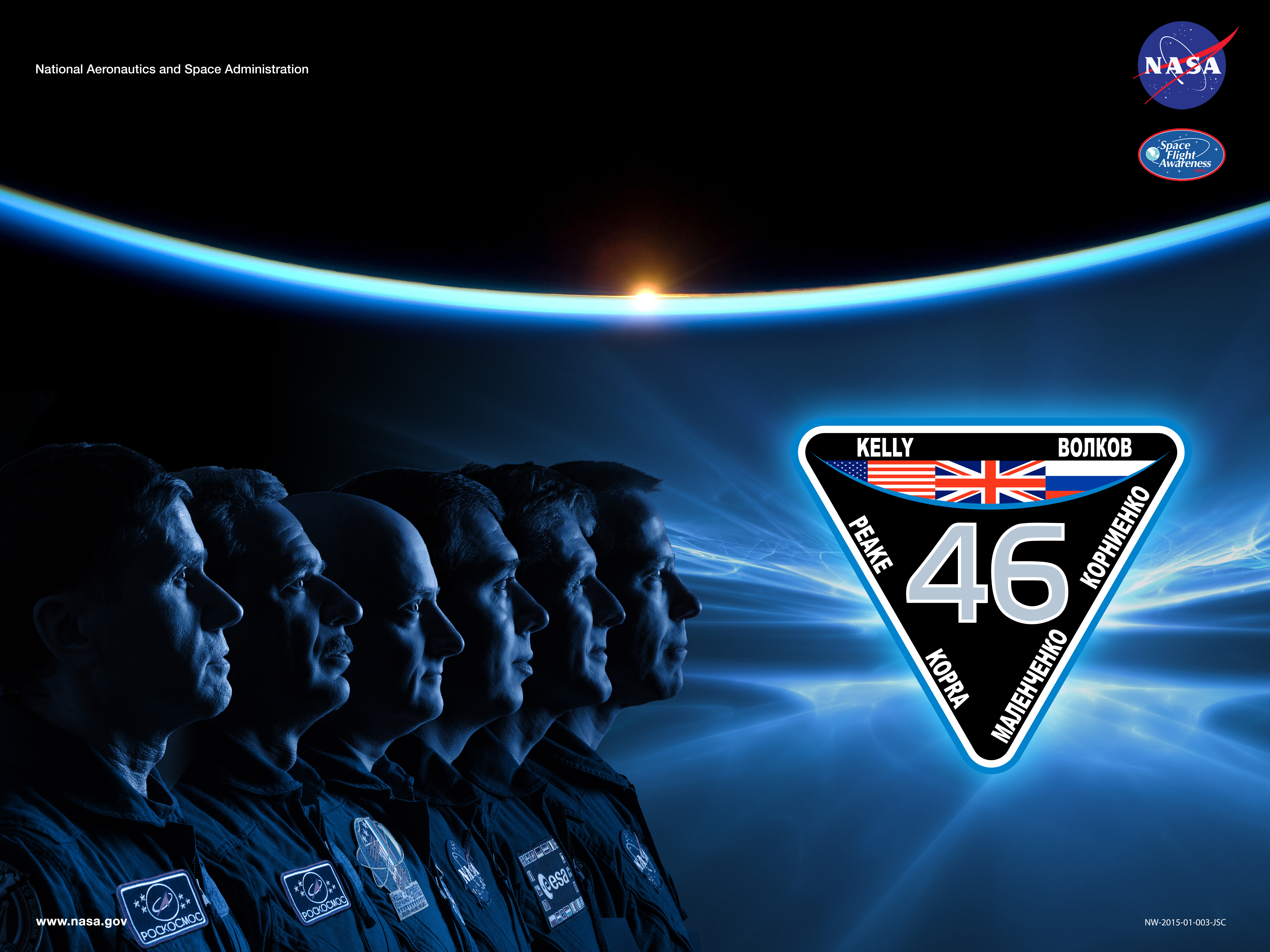
- Promotional Poster
- Mission type: Long-duration expedition

Expedition
- Space station: International Space Station
- Began: 11 December 2015 UTC
- Ended: 2 March 2016 UTC
- Arrived aboard: Soyuz TMA-16M; Soyuz TMA-18M; Soyuz TMA-19M
- Departed aboard: Soyuz TMA-18M; Soyuz TMA-19M

Crew
- Crew size: 6
- Members: Expedition 45/46: Sergey Volkov; Mikhail Korniyenko; Scott Kelly Expedition 46/47: Yuri Malenchenko; Timothy Peake; Timothy Kopra
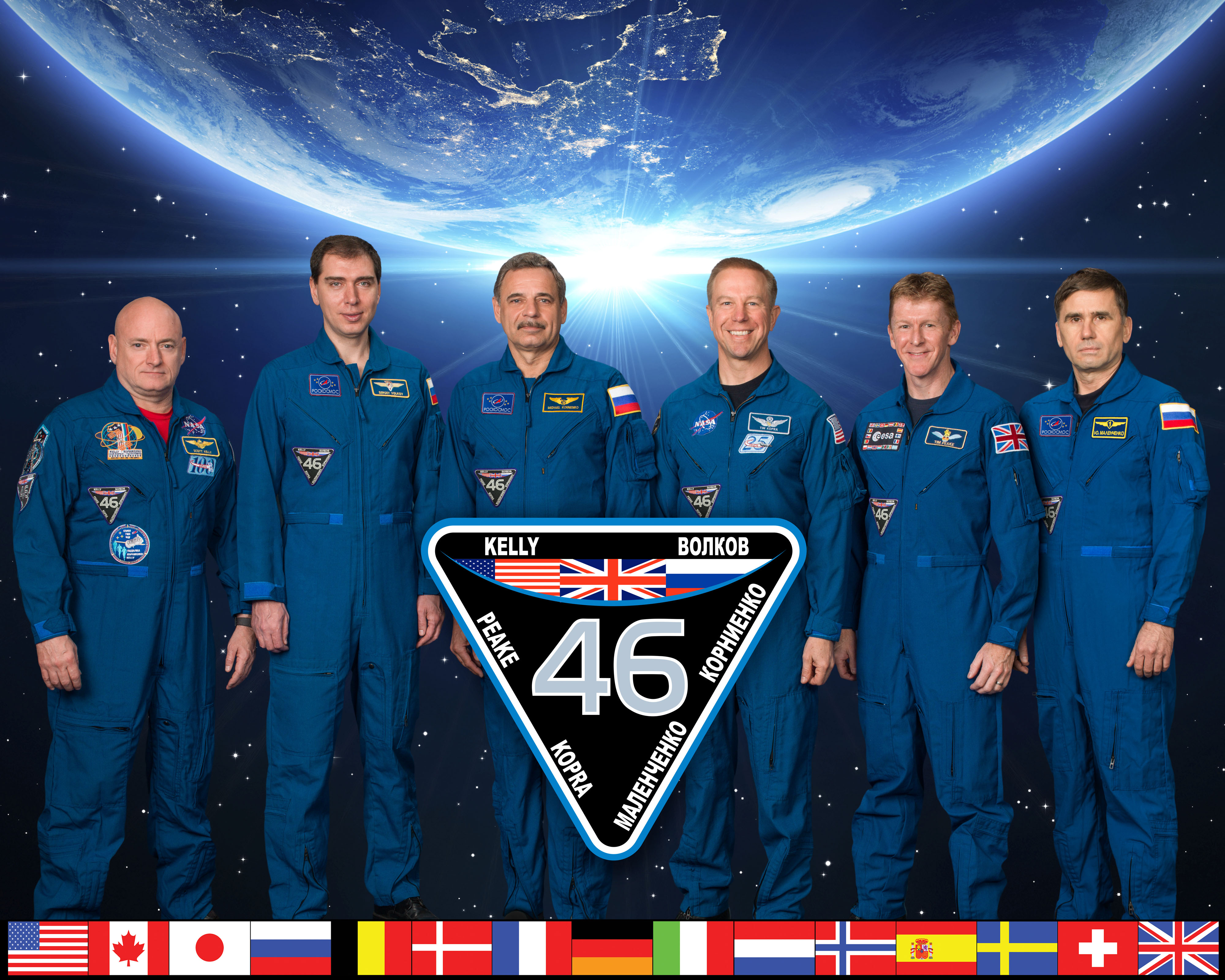
- Expedition 46 mission patch (l-r) Kelly, Volkov, Korniyenko, Kopra, Peake, Malenchenko ISS expeditions

Expedition 46 was the 46th expedition to the International Space Station.

Sergey Volkov, Mikhail Korniyenko and Scott Kelly transferred from Expedition 45, the latter two as part of their year-long stay aboard the ISS. Expedition 46 began with the departure of Soyuz TMA-17M on 11 December 2015 and concluded upon the departure of Soyuz TMA-18M on 1 March 2016, and the crew of Soyuz TMA-19M transferred to Expedition 47. The expedition has the first British ESA astronaut (Tim Peake) to visit the International Space Station (ISS).

== Crew ==
Position	First Part (December 2015)	Second Part (December 2015 to March 2016)
Commander	Scott Kelly, NASA; Fourth and last spaceflight	
Flight engineer	Mikhail Korniyenko, RSA; Second and last spaceflight	
Flight engineer	Sergey Volkov, RSA; Third and last spaceflight	
Flight engineer		Yuri Malenchenko, RSA; Sixth and last spaceflight
Flight engineer		Tim Peake, ESA; Only spaceflight
Flight engineer		Timothy Kopra, NASA; Second and last spaceflight

Source
Spacefacts

== Mission highlights ==
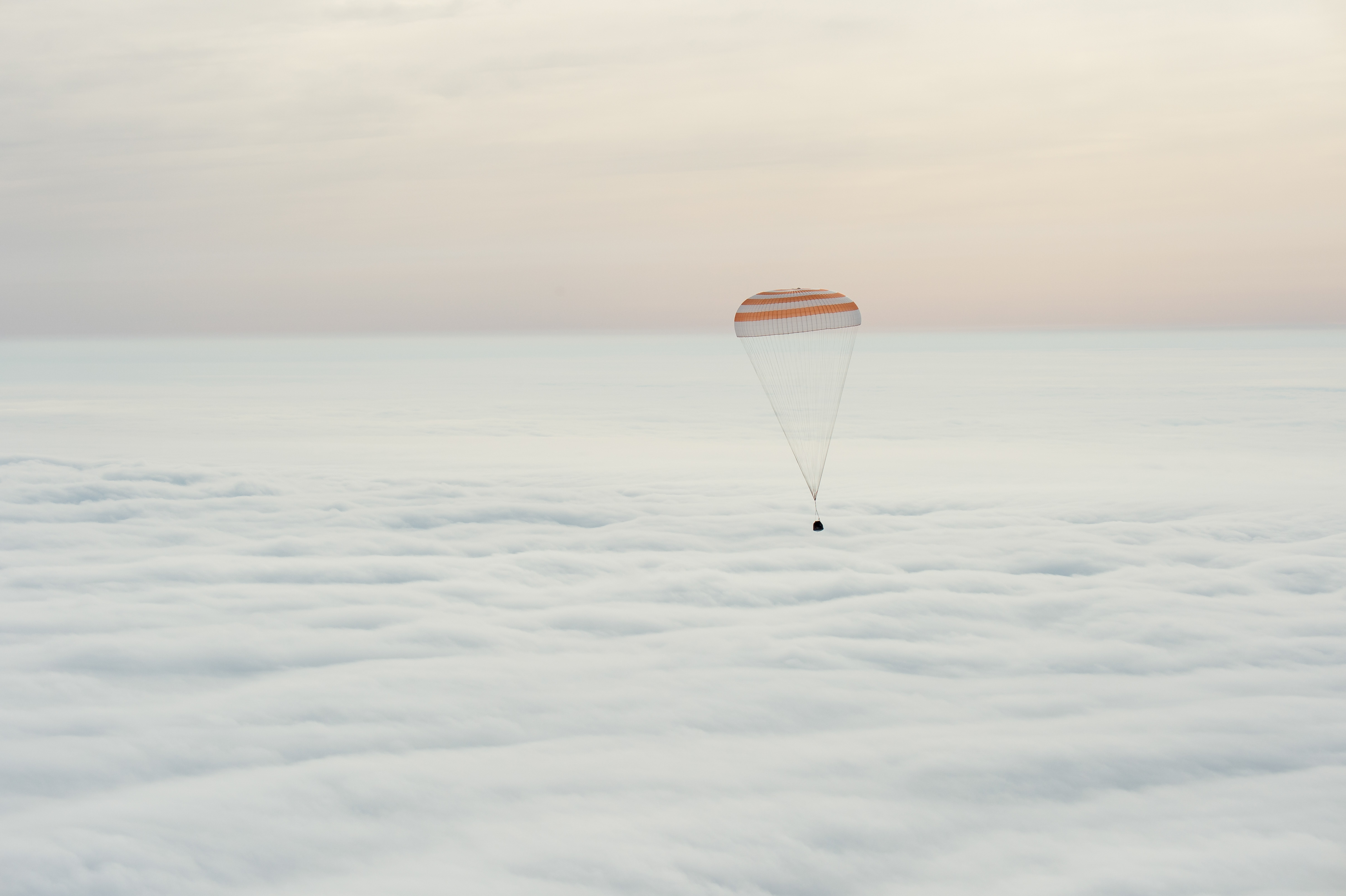
The Soyuz TMA-18M spacecraft is seen as it lands with Expedition 46 Commander Scott Kelly of NASA and Russian cosmonauts Mikhail Kornienko and Sergey Volkov of Roscosmos near the town of Zhezkazgan, Kazakhstan on Wednesday, March 2, 2016 (Kazakh time).

Following the arrival of the Soyuz TMA-19M crew, the next vehicle manoeuvre was the departure of the Progress M-28M, on 19 December. Progress MS-1 then launched to the ISS, atop a Soyuz 2.1a, on 21 December. The same day, Commander Scott Kelly and Timothy Kopra performed a contingency EVA and successfully repaired the Mobile Base System. On 23 December, the Progress MS-1 resupply vehicle docked at the ISS.

On 8 January 2016, pupils from Sandringham School in St Albans made the first amateur radio call to a British astronaut at the International Space Station, contacting Tim Peake as part of his Principia mission.

On 15 January 2016, Tim Peake and Timothy Kopra began an EVA at 12:55 GMT. A failed voltage regulator (1B SSU) was replaced during the EVA. This EVA marked the first official spacewalk by a Briton, Tim Peake, who was wearing the Union Jack on his EMU. NASA decided to finish the spacewalk around 17:00 GMT, as Timothy Kopra reported water in his helmet. The spacesuit, which Kopra was wearing, was the same one worn by Luca Parmitano on 16 July 2013, when his helmet flooded during EVA-23 of Expedition 36.

On 23 February 2016, Scott Kelly displayed his sense of humour by wearing a gorilla suit, while chasing Tim Peake through the space station, in a recorded video with the backing track of Yakety Sax. The following day, a video message from Tim Peake was played at the 2016 Brit Awards, giving congratulations to Adele for her award.

A further EVA was also scheduled to take place during Expedition 46.

== See also ==
- ISS year long mission
