= Soyuz TMA-20M =

2016 Russian crewed spaceflight to the ISS

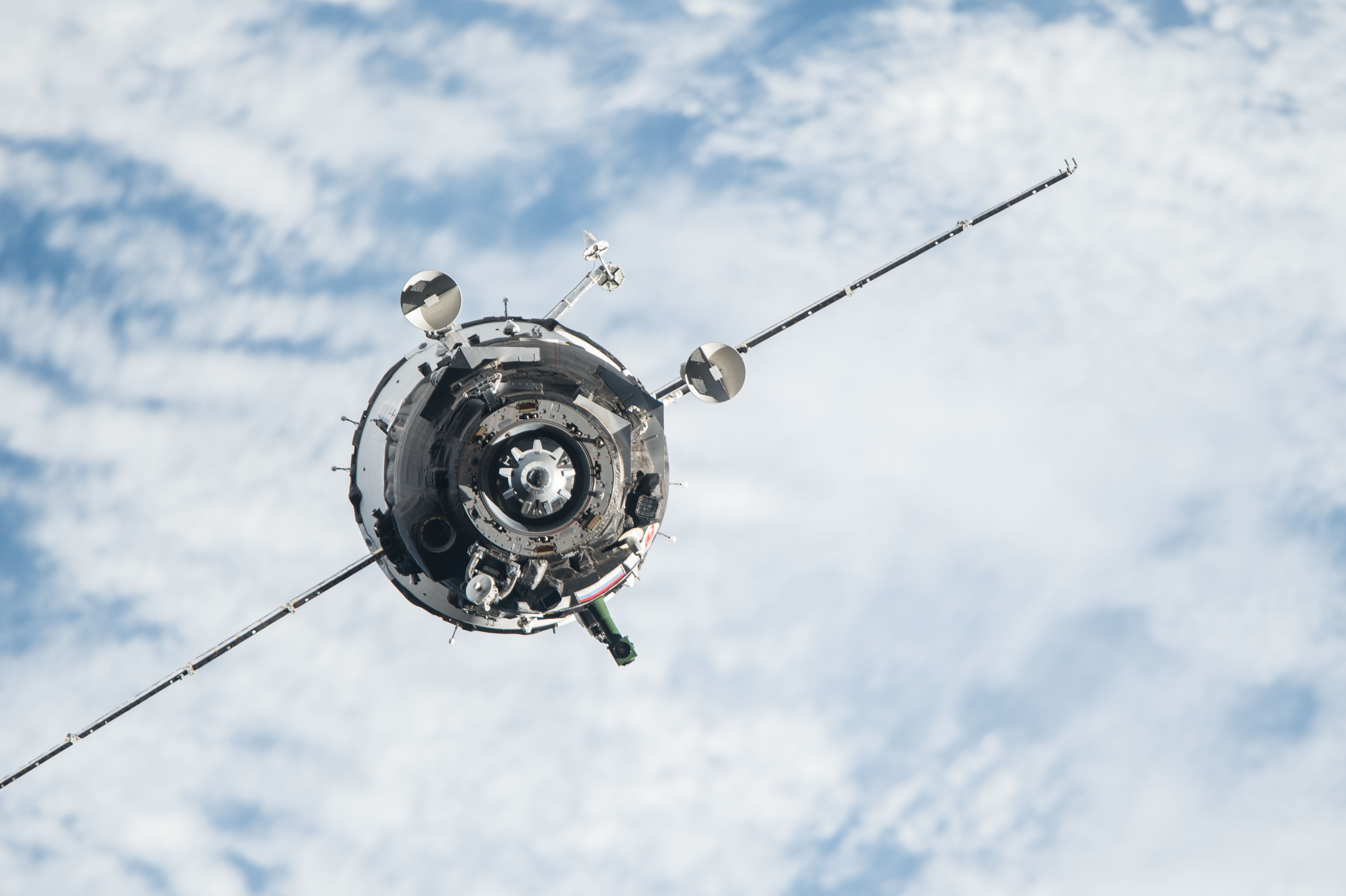
- Soyuz TMA-20M spacecraft approaches the ISS
- Operator: Roscosmos
- COSPAR ID: 2016-018A
- SATCAT no.: 41391
- Mission duration: 172 days 3 hours 47 minutes

Spacecraft properties
- Spacecraft type: Soyuz-TMA-M 11F747 No.720
- Manufacturer: Energia

Crew
- Crew size: 3
- Members: Aleksey Ovchinin; Oleg Skripochka; Jeffrey N. Williams
- Callsign: Burlak

Start of mission
- Launch date: March 18, 2016; 21:26:38 UTC
- Rocket: Soyuz-FG
- Launch site: Baikonur 1/5

End of mission
- Landing date: September 7, 2016; 01:13 UTC
- Landing site: Kazakhstan

Orbital parameters
- Reference system: Geocentric
- Regime: Low Earth

Docking with ISS
- Docking port: Poisk zenith
- Docking date: March 19, 2016; 03:09 UTC
- Undocking date: September 6, 2016; 21:51:30 UTC
- Time docked: 5 months, 2 weeks, 4 days, 18 hours, 42 minutes
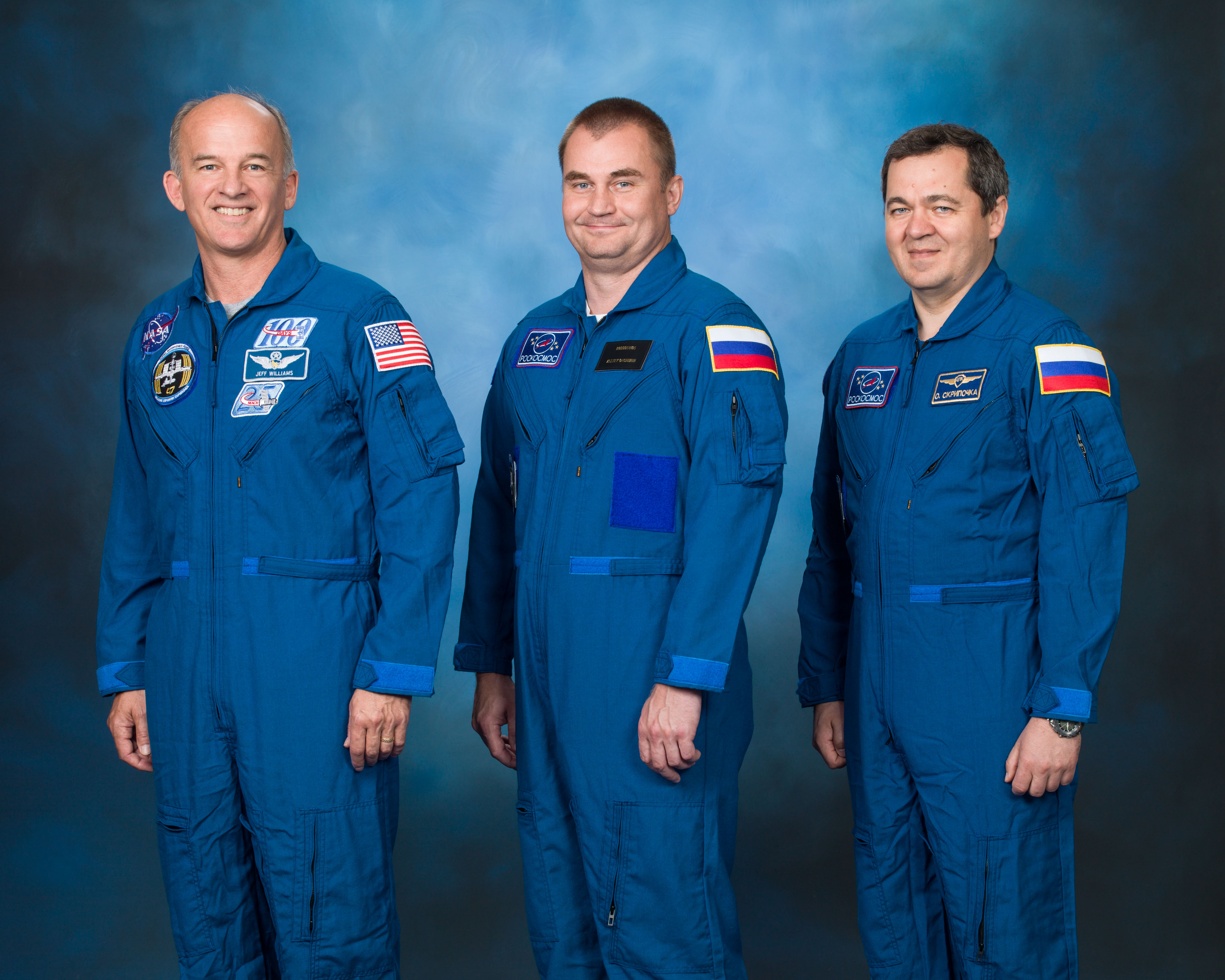
- (l-r) Williams, Ovchinin and Skripochka Soyuz programme (Crewed missions)

Soyuz TMA-20M was a 2016 Russian Soyuz spaceflight to the International Space Station (ISS). It transported three members of the Expedition 47 crew to the ISS. TMA-20M was the 129th flight of a Soyuz spacecraft. The crew consisted of a Russian commander and flight engineer, as well as an American flight engineer.

It was the final flight of the Soyuz TMA-M design, being replaced by the Soyuz MS in 2016.

== Crew ==
Position	Crew Member
Commander	(Russia) Aleksey Ovchinin, Roscosmos; Expedition 47; First spaceflight
Flight Engineer 1	(Russia) Oleg Skripochka, Roscosmos; Expedition 47; Second spaceflight
Flight Engineer 2	(United States) Jeffrey Williams, NASA; Expedition 47; Fourth and last spaceflight

=== Backup crew ===
Position	Crew Member
Commander	(Russia) Sergey Ryzhikov, Roscosmos
Flight Engineer 1	(Russia) Andrei Borisenko, Roscosmos
Flight Engineer 2	(United States) Shane Kimbrough, NASA
