= Tim Peake =

British Army Air Corps officer and astronaut (born 1972)

Tim Peake CMG HonFIET
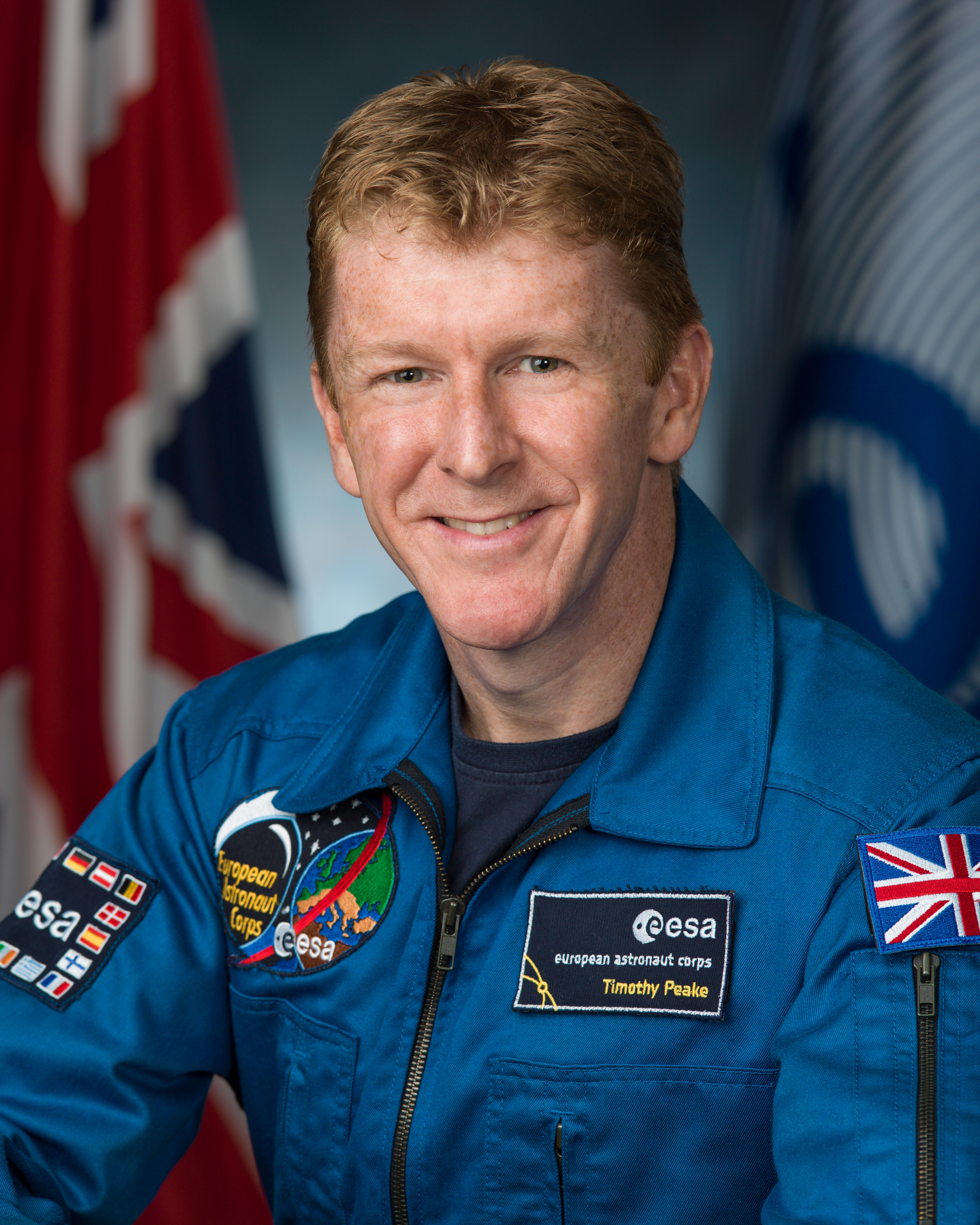
- Peake in 2013
- Born: Timothy Nigel Peake; 7 April 1972 (age 54); Chichester, West Sussex, England
- Education: University of Portsmouth (BSc)
- Occupations: Test pilot and astronaut
- Awards: Companion of the Order of St Michael and St George
- Space career

ESA astronaut
- Previous occupation: British Army officer
- Status: Retired
- Rank: Major
- Time in space: 185 days, 22 hours, 11 minutes
- Selection: 2009 ESA Group
- Total EVAs: 1
- Total EVA time: 4 hours, 43 minutes
- Mission: Soyuz TMA-19M (Expedition 46/47)
- Website: www.timpeake.com principia.org.uk

Major Timothy Nigel Peake CMG (born 7 April 1972) is a retired British European Space Agency astronaut, Army Air Corps officer and author.

He is the first British ESA astronaut, the second astronaut to bear a flag of the United Kingdom patch (following Helen Sharman), the sixth person born in the United Kingdom to go on board the International Space Station, and the seventh UK-born person in space. He began the ESA's intensive astronaut basic training course in September 2009 and graduated on 22 November 2010.

== Early life ==
Peake was born in Chichester, West Sussex, on 7 April 1972. He grew up in Westbourne, West Sussex. He studied at the Chichester High School for Boys, leaving in 1990 to attend the Royal Military Academy Sandhurst.

== Career ==
=== Military and aeronautical ===
Upon graduation from Royal Military Academy Sandhurst, Peake received a short-service commission as a second lieutenant in the Army Air Corps on 8 August 1992. He served during rotary training holding as a platoon commander with the Royal Green Jackets, and was promoted to lieutenant on 8 August 1994. On 9 July 1997, he transferred to a regular commission, receiving a promotion to captain on 20 August.

Peake became a qualified helicopter pilot in 1994 and a qualified helicopter instructor in 1998, graduating from CFS(H) at the Defence Helicopter Flying School at RAF Shawbury in Shropshire. Promoted to major on 31 July 2004, he graduated from the Empire Test Pilots School in Wiltshire the following year, and was awarded the Westland's Trophy for best rotary wing student. He then served on Rotary Wing Test and Evaluation Squadron (RWTES) at MOD Boscombe Down completing trials on Apache helicopters.

Peake completed a BSc (Hons) in Flight Dynamics and Evaluation at the University of Portsmouth the following year. Peake left the army in 2009 after 17 years of service and over 3,000 flying hours to his credit, becoming a test pilot with AgustaWestland.

=== In ESA ===
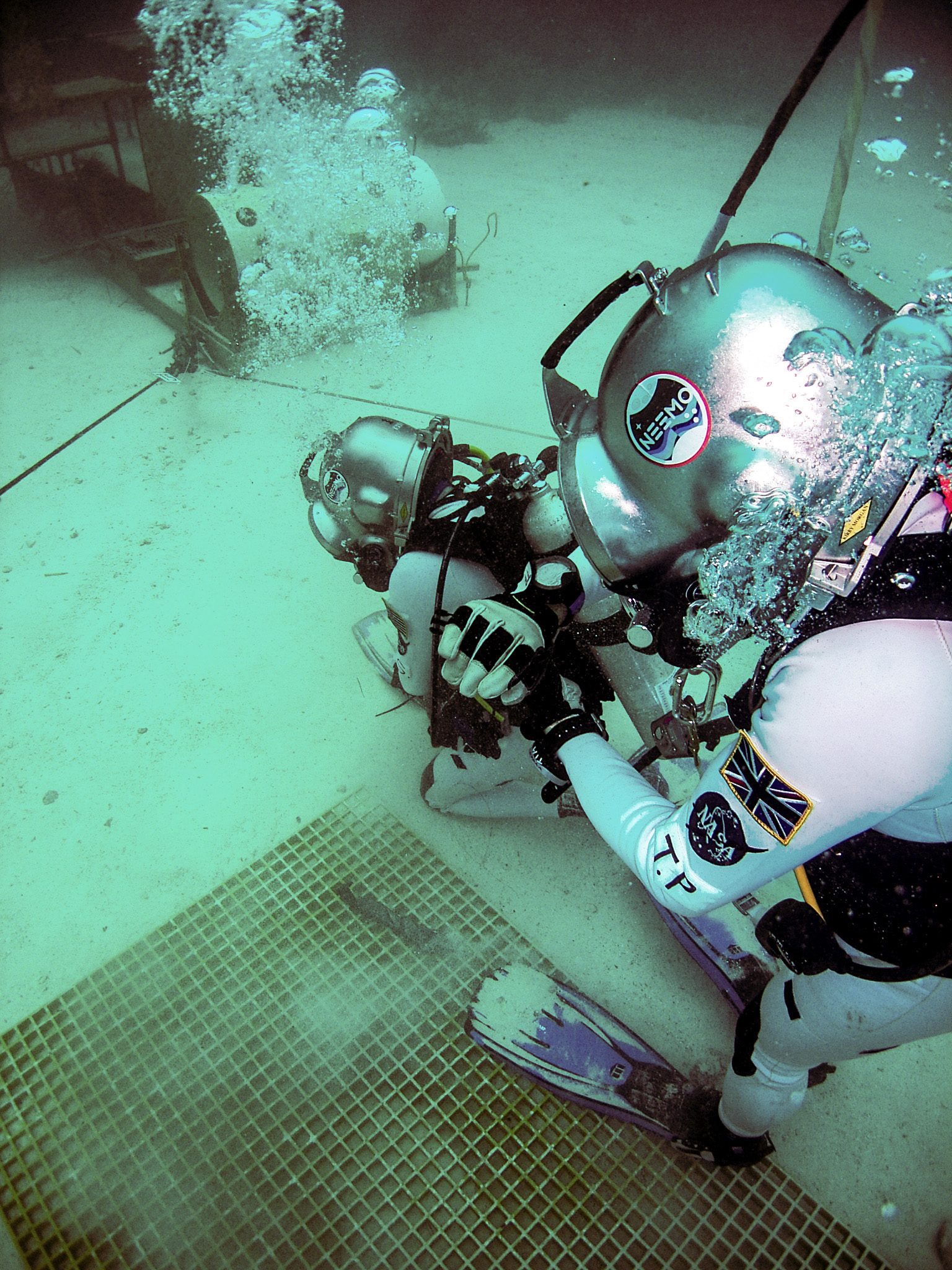
Peake on the NEEMO 16 mission

Peake was selected to join the European Space Agency astronaut corps in 2009, flew to the ISS in 2015/16, and retired from active service in 2023.

Peake beat over 8,000 other applicants for one of the six places on the ESA's new astronaut training programme. The selection process included taking academic tests, fitness assessments and several interviews. Peake moved to Cologne, Germany, with his family for the ESA training.

Peake was the first British or UK-born person to fly into space without a private contract (as did Helen Sharman, Mark Shuttleworth, and Richard Garriott) and/or foreign citizenship (held by astronauts Michael Foale, Gregory H. Johnson, Piers Sellers, Nicholas Patrick, Shuttleworth, and Garriott).

As part of his extensive astronaut training in 2011, Peake and five other astronauts joined an international mission, living in and exploring cave systems in Sardinia. This ESA CAVES mission enabled them to study how humans react to living in extreme conditions with complete isolation from the outside world. This expedition gave the team an idea of what they could expect and how they would cope in the confined space of the ISS.

On 16 April 2012, NASA announced that Peake would serve as an aquanaut aboard the Aquarius underwater laboratory during the NEEMO 16 undersea exploration mission, scheduled to begin on 11 June 2012 and last twelve days. The NEEMO 16 crew successfully "splashed down" at 11:05 am on 11 June. On the morning of 12 June, Peake and his crewmates officially became aquanauts, having spent over 24 hours underwater. The crew safely returned to the surface on 22 June.

During Expedition 44, Peake served as a backup astronaut for Soyuz TMA-17M.

=== Expedition 46/47 ===
Peake was launched to the space station (ISS), on 15 December 2015, for Expeditions 46 and 47. He launched successfully at 11:03 GMT from Baikonur Cosmodrome on board Soyuz TMA-19M. The official website dedicated to his mission is principia.org.uk.

During the launch, as per tradition, each cosmonaut was allowed three songs to be played to them. Peake chose Queen's "Don't Stop Me Now", U2's "Beautiful Day" and Coldplay's "A Sky Full of Stars".

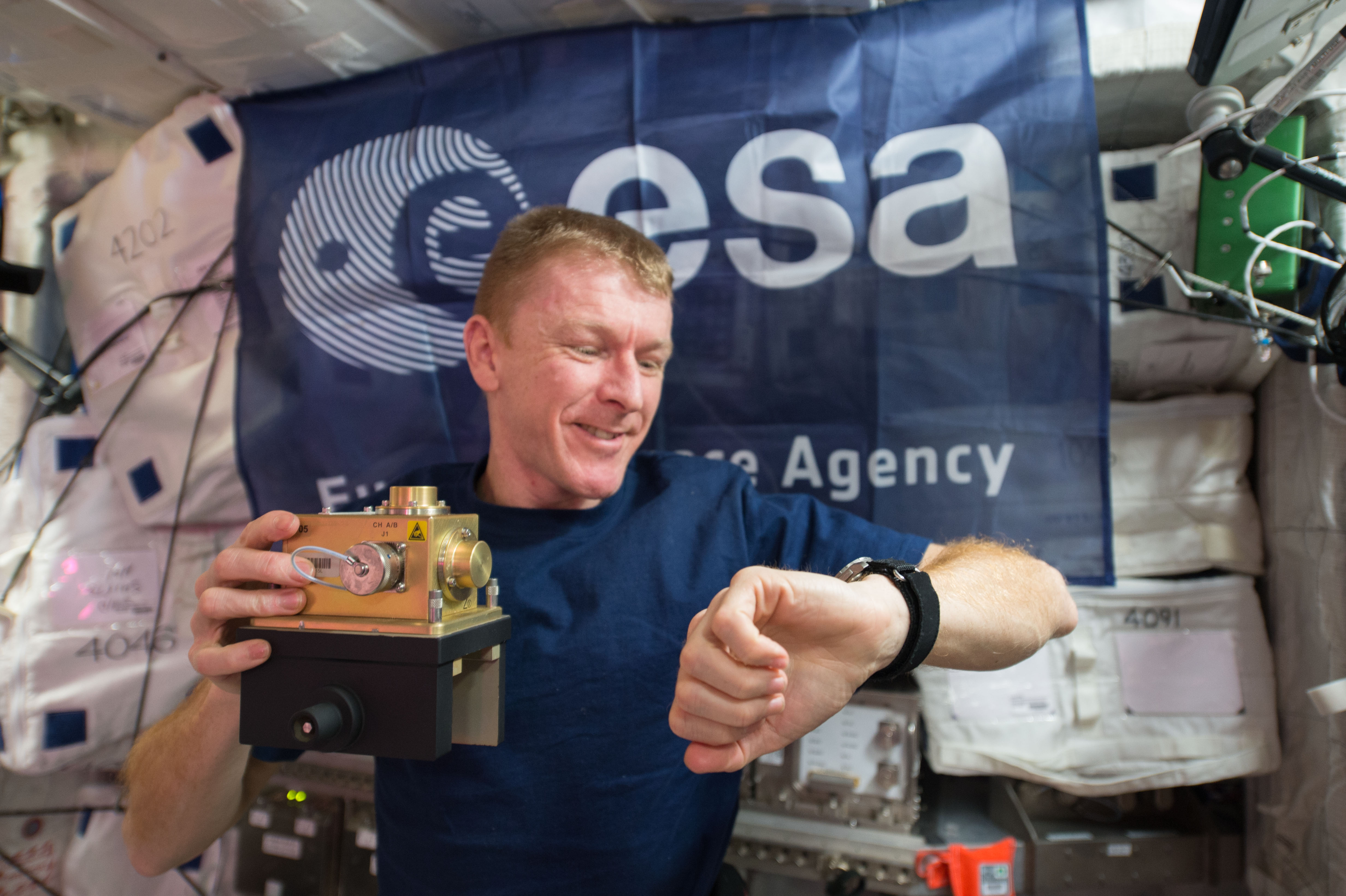
Peake working in the Columbus module

During docking, the Kurs docking navigation system failed, and a manual docking was performed by Yuri Malenchenko who was alongside Peake and Tim Kopra. This delayed docking with the ISS by 10 minutes. The Soyuz finally docked with the ISS at 17:33 GMT. Peake received messages of support from the Queen and Elton John, after the successful docking. His first meal at the ISS was a bacon sandwich and a cup of tea.

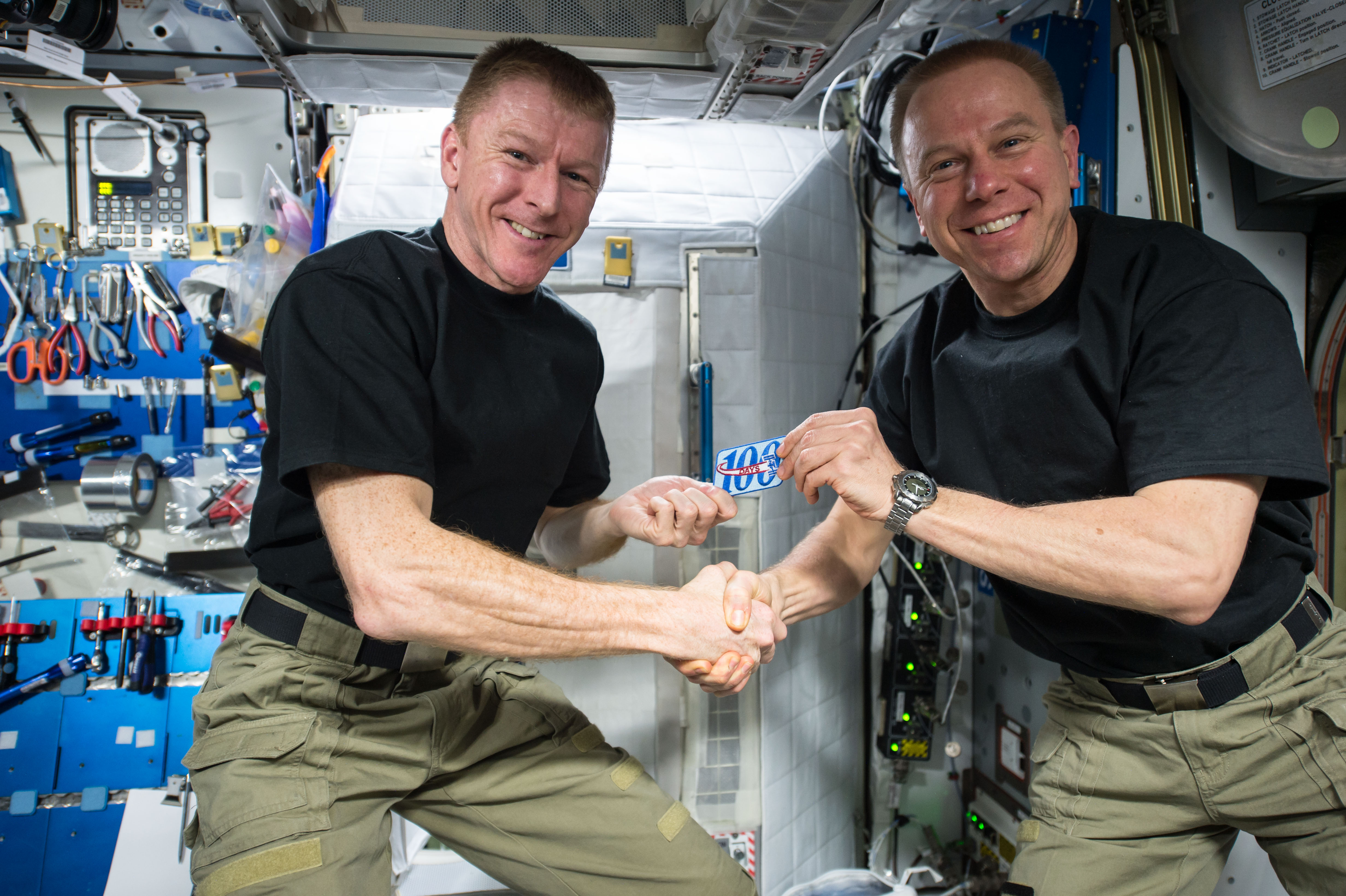
Peake celebrating 100 days in space with Expedition 47 commander Tim Kopra

A new year's message by Peake was broadcast by the BBC to celebrate 2016.

Peake supported a spacewalk by two American astronauts on 21 December 2015. He participated in the first spacewalk outside the ISS by a British astronaut on 15 January 2016. The purpose of the spacewalk was to replace a faulty sequential shunt unit on the station's solar arrays.

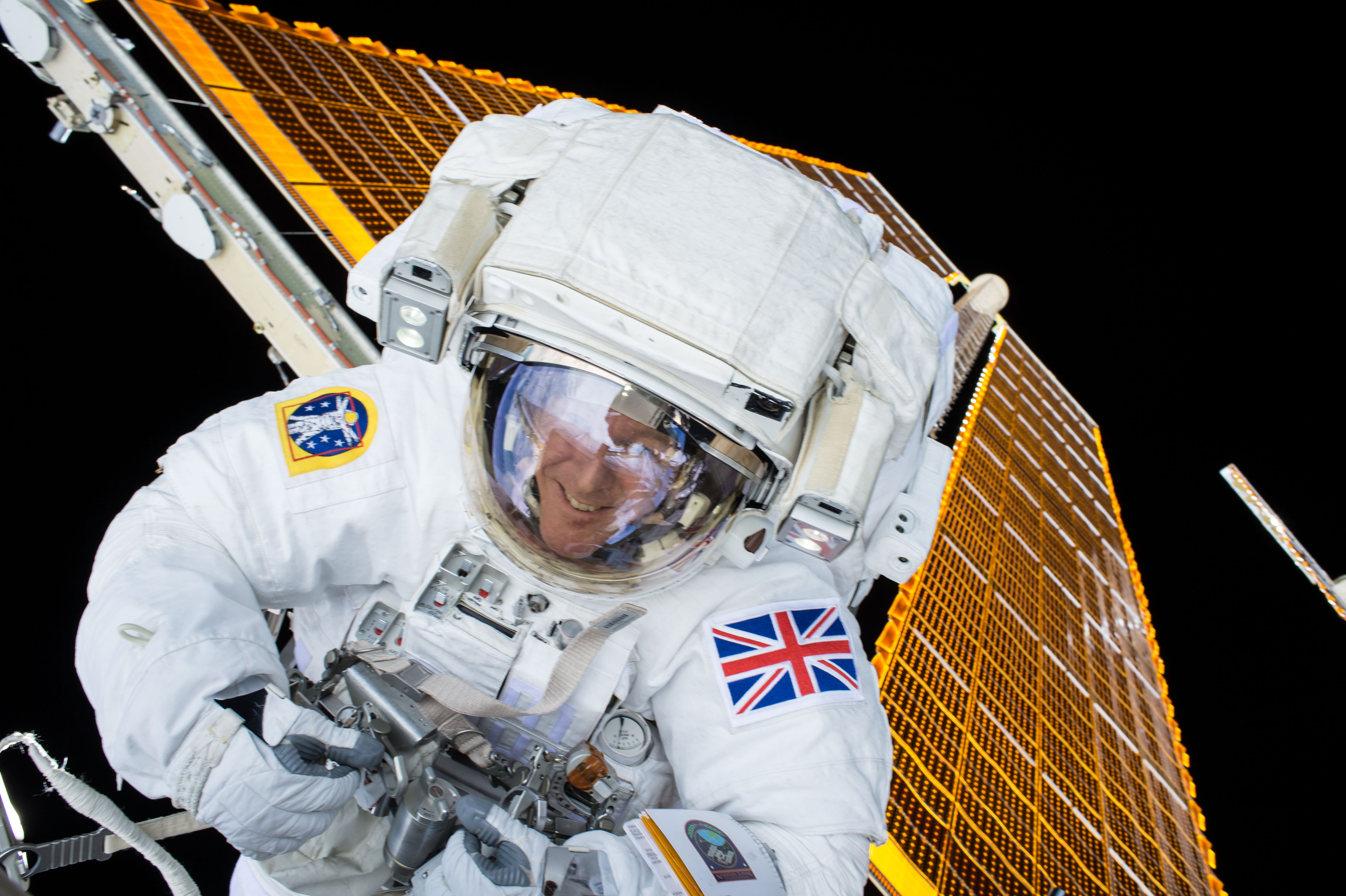
Peake pictured during his first career EVA

In February 2016, Peake presented Adele with a Global Success award at the Brit Awards in London.

On 24 April 2016, Peake ran the 2016 London Marathon from the ISS treadmill. Peake became the first man to run the marathon from space and the second person to run a marathon from space, after Sunita Williams, who ran the 2007 Boston Marathon from the ISS.

Peake was appointed a Companion of the Order of St Michael and St George (CMG) in the 2016 Birthday Honours for services to space research and scientific education.

At a special meeting of the Chichester City Council on 17 February 2016, it was agreed unanimously to confer the Freedom of the City upon Peake with the appropriate ceremony after his return later in 2016.

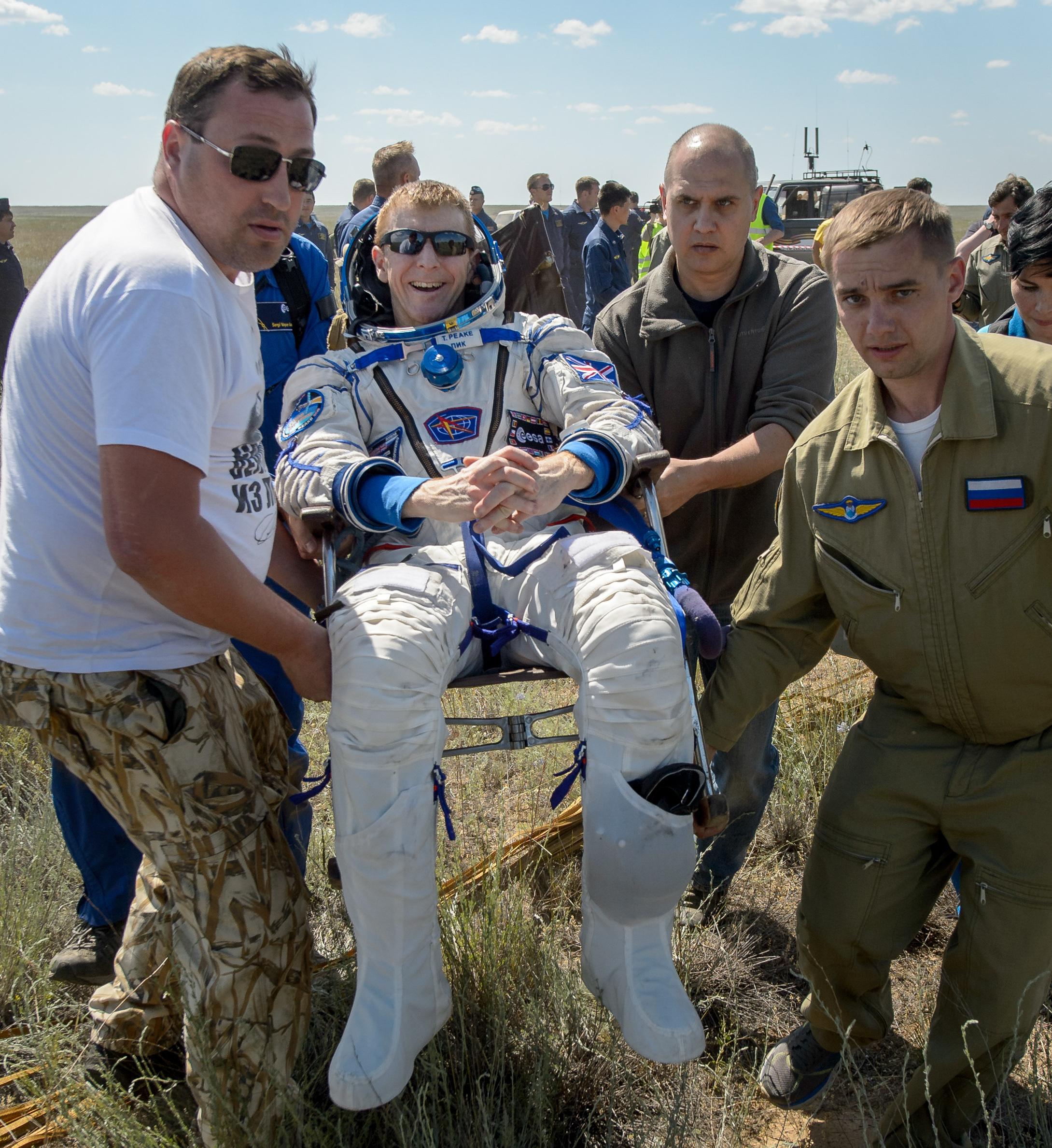
Peake being carried to a medical tent shortly after the landing of Soyuz TMA-19M

On 18 June 2016, Peake returned to Earth from the ISS aboard the descent module of the Soyuz spacecraft that had taken him to the space station in December 2015. The spacecraft landed on the Kazakh Steppe in Kazakhstan, almost 480 km (300 mi) southwest of the major city of Karaganda, landing at 09.15 UTC. Peake had completed approximately 3,000 orbits of the Earth and had covered a distance of 125 million kilometres (78 million miles).

=== Post-ESA career ===
In 2026, Peake co-presented the fourth season of the BBC podcast 13 Minutes to the Moon covering the Artemis II mission.

== Nobel Peace Prize advocacy ==
Life up here is absolutely spectacular ... amazing view of Earth ... way beyond my expectation.

At the UK National Student Space Conference in early 2014, Peake expressed his support for the initiative to award the International Space Station (ISS) partnership the Nobel Peace Prize. "I was delighted to read about the International Space Station and the discussions about it being nominated for the Nobel Peace Prize because … it has been one of the most incredible international partnerships...[The ISS] really has brought many nations together through difficult times, and continues to do so." Peake noted that with increasing constraints on space programmes around the world, collaborative initiatives such as ISS will be necessary for future endeavours. "I think [the ISS] really has to be the model for future space exploration because with budgets becoming more and more constrained, then, really one nation is not going to have the capability to expand exploration out into the solar system, to Mars and beyond. We are going to have to work together on projects."

== Personal life ==
Peake is married to Rebecca; the couple have two sons.

He enjoys climbing, caving, cross-country running and triathlon.

When he was younger Peake was a Cub Scout and is now an ambassador for the Prince's Trust and the Scout Association in the UK, and for STEM Learning.

Peake is Honorary Colonel of 9 Regiment Army Air Corps.

== Honours and awards ==
In October 2016, at the National Space Centre, Tim Peake received an honorary Doctorate of Science from the University of Leicester. In May 2021, as part of its 150th-anniversary celebrations, the Institution of Engineering and Technology awarded Peake an Honorary Fellowship for his outstanding contribution to space exploration, engineering and the technology industry.

Companion of the Order of St Michael and St George (CMG)	Queens Birthday Honours 2016, "in recognition of for services to space research and scientific education".
NATO Former Republic of Yugoslavia Medal	With clasp 'Former Yugoslavia'
General Service Medal	With clasp 'Northern Ireland'
Queen Elizabeth II Golden Jubilee Medal	2002
Queen Elizabeth II Platinum Jubilee Medal	2022
King Charles III Coronation Medal	2023

== Bibliography ==
- Hello, is this planet Earth?: My View from the International Space Station (Century, 2016. ISBN 978-1-78089-715-8)
- Ask an Astronaut: My Guide to Life in Space (Century, 2017. ISBN 978-1-78089-817-9)
- The Astronaut Selection Test Book: Do You Have What it Takes for Space? (Century, 2018. ISBN 978-1-78089-918-3)
- Limitless: The Autobiography (Century, 2020. ISBN 978-1-5291-2557-3)
- Swarm Rising (Hodder, 2021. ISBN 9781444960846)
- Swarm Enemy (Hodder, 2021. ISBN 9781444960877)
- The Cosmic Diary of our Incredible Universe (Wren & Rook, 2022. ISBN 9781526363619)
- Space: The Human Story (Century, 2023 ISBN 9781529913507)

== See also ==
- British astronauts
