= Soyuz TMA-19M =

2015 Russian crewed spaceflight to the ISS

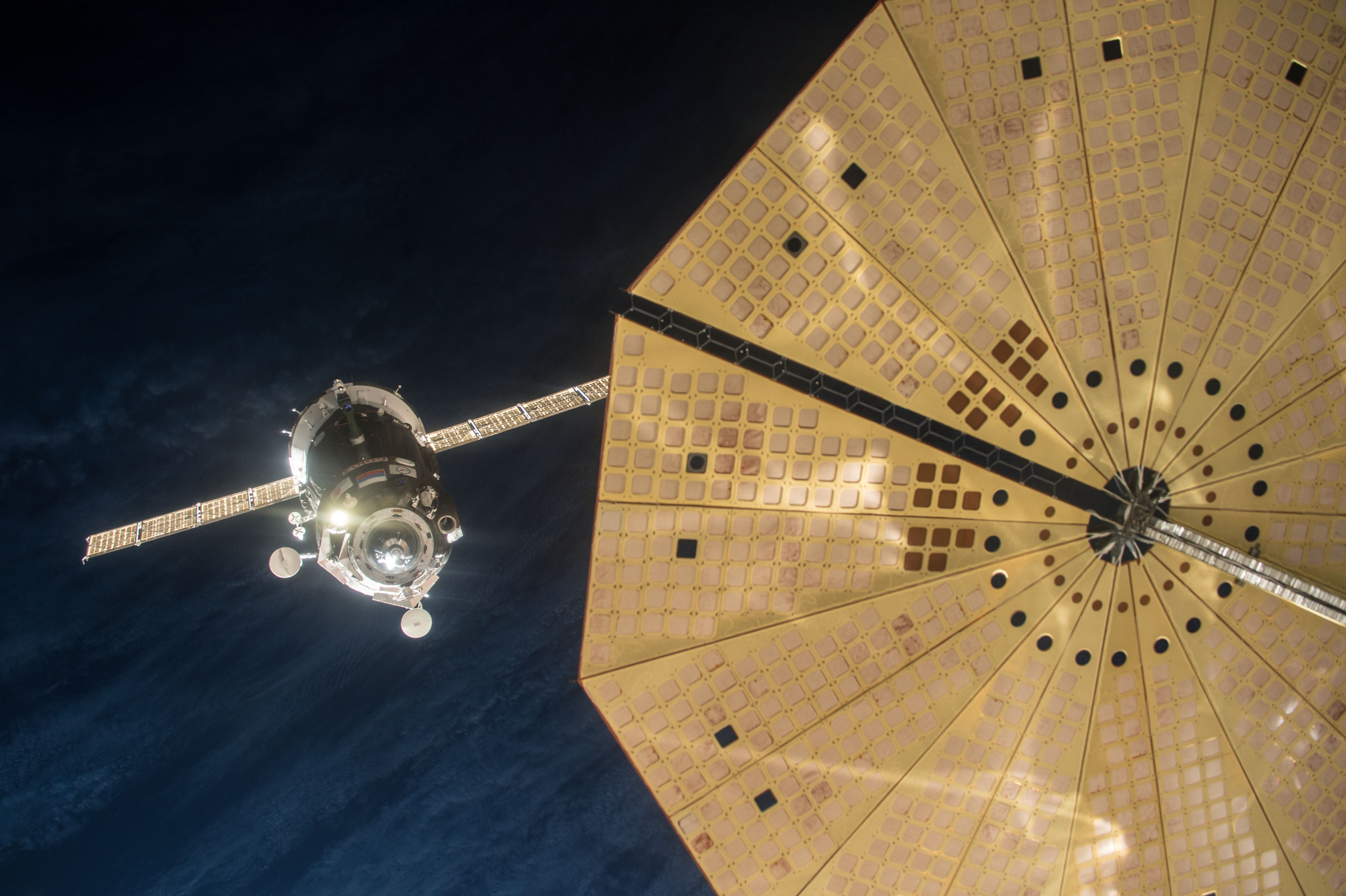
- The Soyuz TMA-19M approaches the ISS on 15 December 2015, seen behind the solar panels of Cygnus CRS OA-4
- Operator: Roskosmos
- COSPAR ID: 2015-076A
- SATCAT no.: 41124
- Mission duration: 185 days 22 hours 11 minutes

Spacecraft properties
- Spacecraft type: Soyuz-TMA-M 11F747 No.719
- Manufacturer: RKK Energia

Crew
- Crew size: 3
- Members: Yuri Malenchenko; Timothy Kopra; Timothy Peake
- Callsign: Agate

Start of mission
- Launch date: 15 December 2015, 11:03:09 UTC
- Rocket: Soyuz-FG
- Launch site: Baikonur 1/5

End of mission
- Landing date: 18 June 2016, 09:15 UTC
- Landing site: Kazakhstan

Orbital parameters
- Reference system: Geocentric
- Regime: Low Earth

Docking with ISS
- Docking port: Rassvet nadir
- Docking date: December 15, 2015; 17:33:29 UTC
- Undocking date: 18 June 2016 5:52 UTC
- Time docked: 185 days, 12 hours and 18 minutes
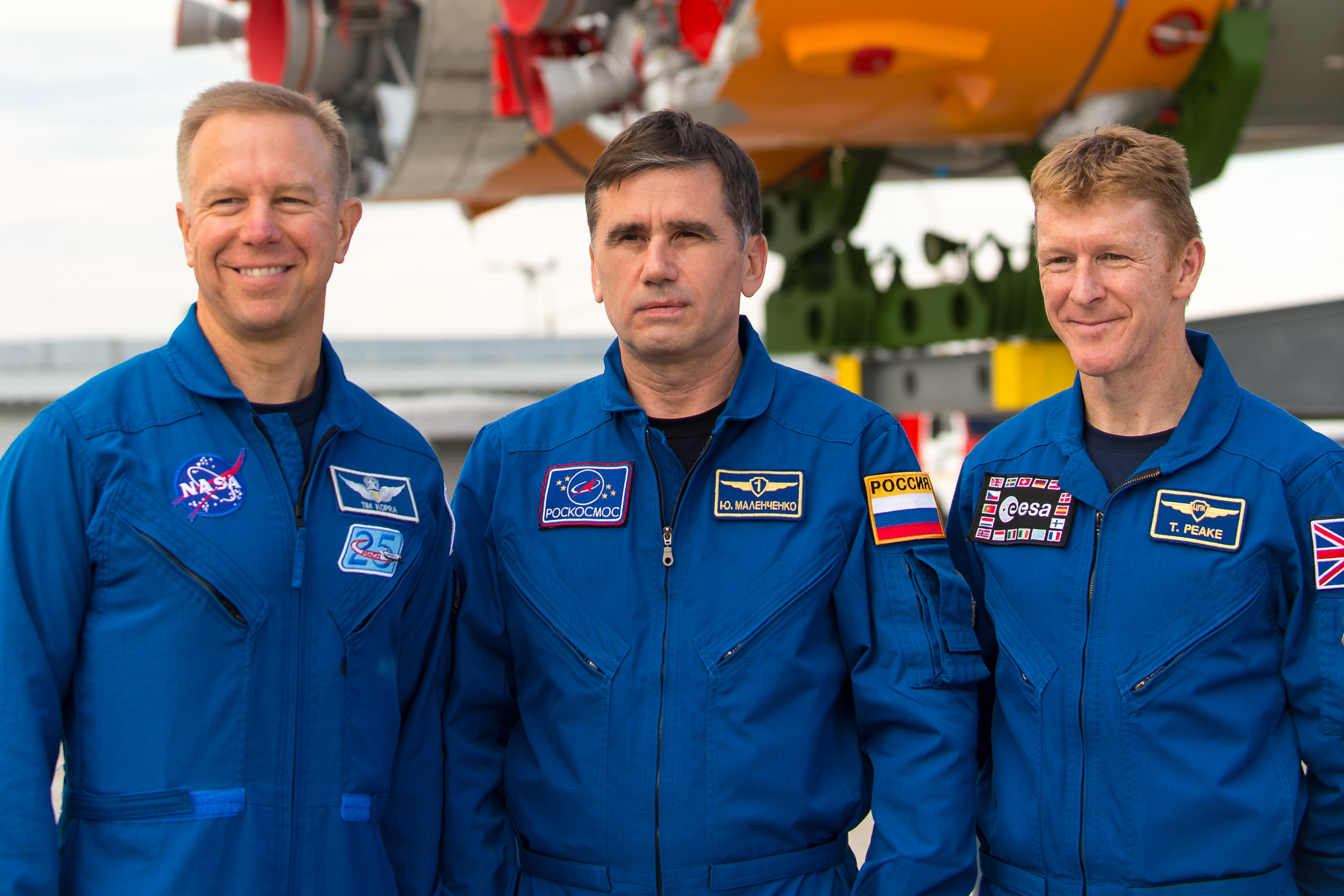
- (l-r) Kopra, Malenchenko and Peake Soyuz programme (Crewed missions)

Soyuz TMA-19M was a 2015 Russian Soyuz spaceflight to the International Space Station. It was launched on December 15, 2015 from Baikonur Cosmodrome, transporting three members of the Expedition 46 crew to the International Space Station. TMA-19M was the 128th flight of a Soyuz spacecraft since the first in 1967. The crew consisted of a Russian commander accompanied by American and British astronauts. The European segment of the mission was called "Principia". The flight returned to Earth on June 18, 2016. The Soyuz TMA-19M descent module is now in the collection of the UK's Science Museum Group.

== Crew ==
Position	Crew Member
Flight engineer 3	(Russia) Yuri Malenchenko, RSA; Expedition 46; Sixth and last spaceflight
Flight Engineer 1	(United States) Timothy Kopra, NASA; Expedition 46; Second and last spaceflight
Flight Engineer 2	(United Kingdom) Timothy Peake, ESA; Expedition 46; Only spaceflight

=== Backup crew ===
Position	Crew Member
Commander	(Russia) Anatoli Ivanishin, RSA
Flight Engineer 1	(Japan) Takuya Onishi, JAXA
Flight Engineer 2	(United States) Kathleen Rubins, NASA

== Mission highlights ==
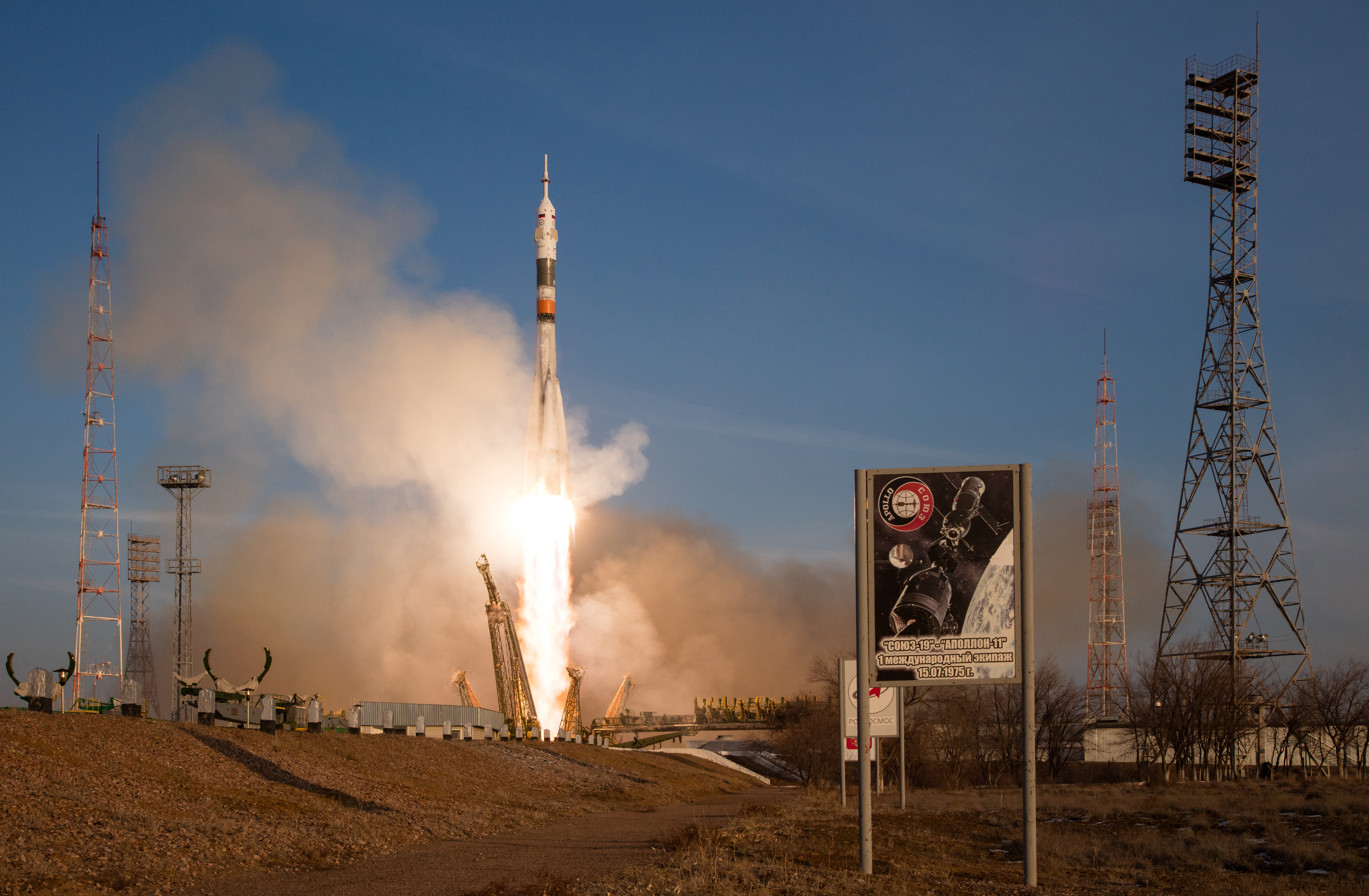
The Soyuz TMA-19M mission lifts off to the ISS on 15 December 2015

Soyuz TMA-19M was launched atop of a Soyuz-FG rocket at 11:03:09 UTC on 15 December 2015 from the Baikonur Cosmodrome, Kazakhstan. Following the launch, the Soyuz spacecraft successfully achieved orbital insertion 9 minutes later and began its 4-orbit journey to the Space Station. Unusually, while docking, the Kurs docking navigation system failed, and a manual docking had to be performed by Yuri Malenchenko. This delayed docking with the ISS by 10 minutes. The Soyuz docked with the ISS at 17:33:29 UTC the same day. The crew then boarded the ISS at 19:58 UTC.

Soyuz TMA-19M undocked on June 18, 2016 at 5:52 UTC, after being docked for 186 days. The crew landed safely in Kazakhstan, southeast of the town of Dzhezkazgan on 09:15 UTC.

== See also ==
- 2015 in spaceflight
