= Electrical system of the International Space Station =

Solar powered electrical system

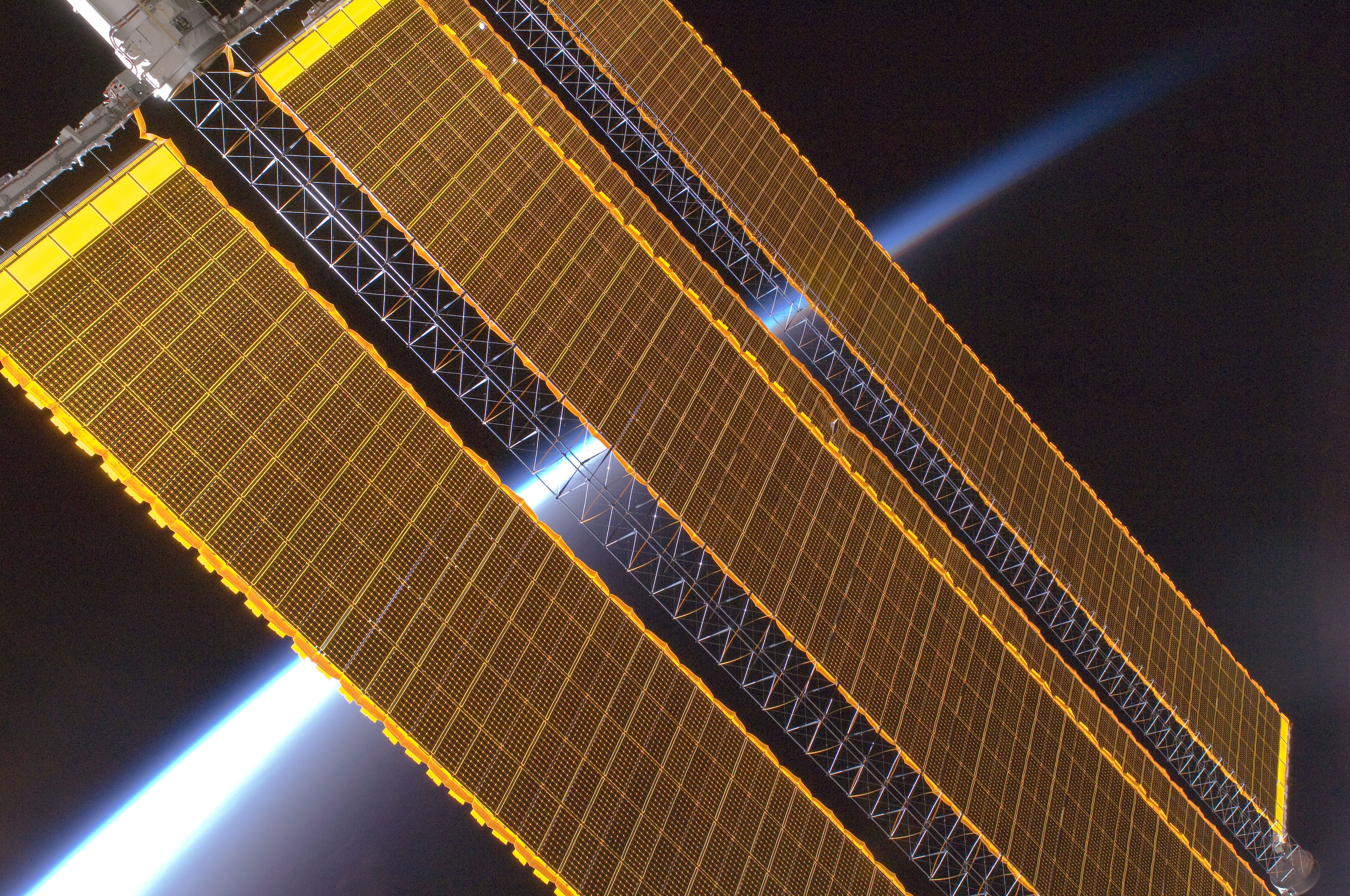
International Space Station solar array wing (Expedition 17 crew, August 2008).

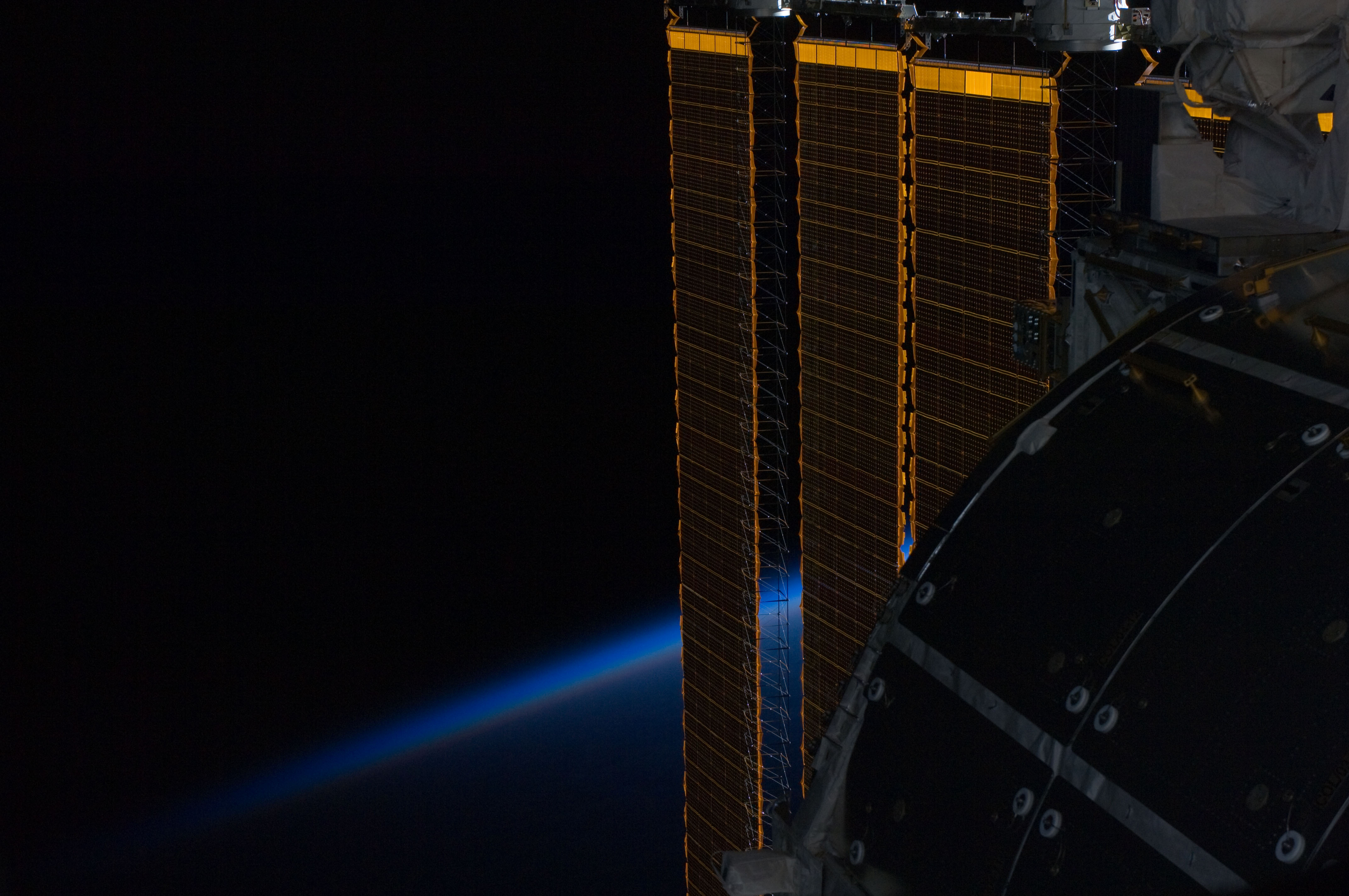
An ISS solar panel intersecting Earth's horizon.

The electrical system of the International Space Station is a critical part of the International Space Station (ISS) as it allows the operation of essential life-support systems, safe operation of the station, operation of science equipment, as well as improving crew comfort. The ISS electrical system uses solar cells to directly convert sunlight to electricity. Large numbers of cells are assembled in arrays to produce high power levels. This method of harnessing solar power is called photovoltaics.

The process of collecting sunlight, converting it to electricity, and managing and distributing this electricity builds up excess heat that can damage spacecraft equipment. This heat must be eliminated for reliable operation of the space station in orbit. The ISS power system uses radiators to dissipate the heat away from the spacecraft. The radiators are shaded from sunlight and aligned toward the cold void of deep space.

== Solar array wing ==
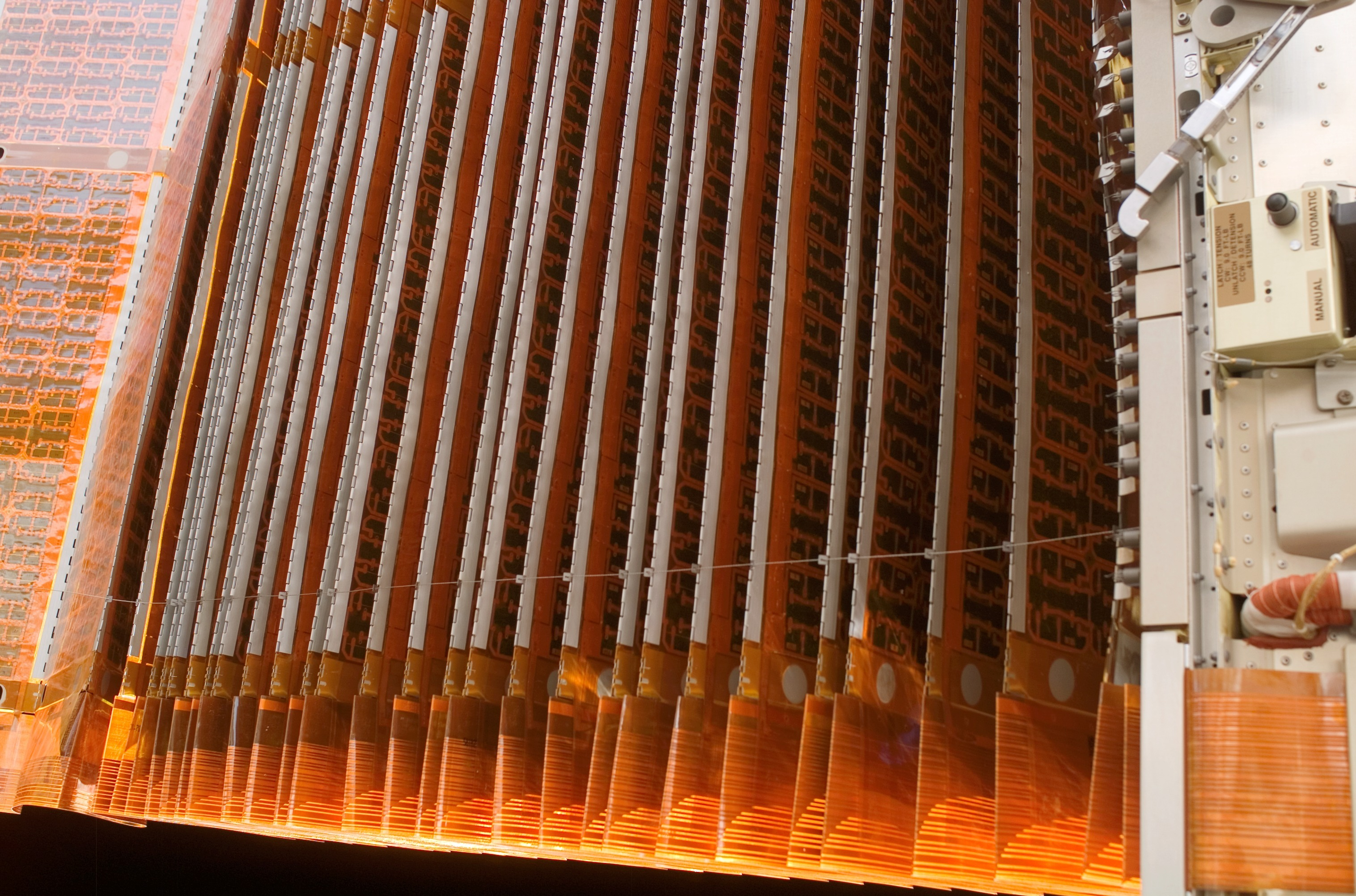
Close-up view of folded solar array.

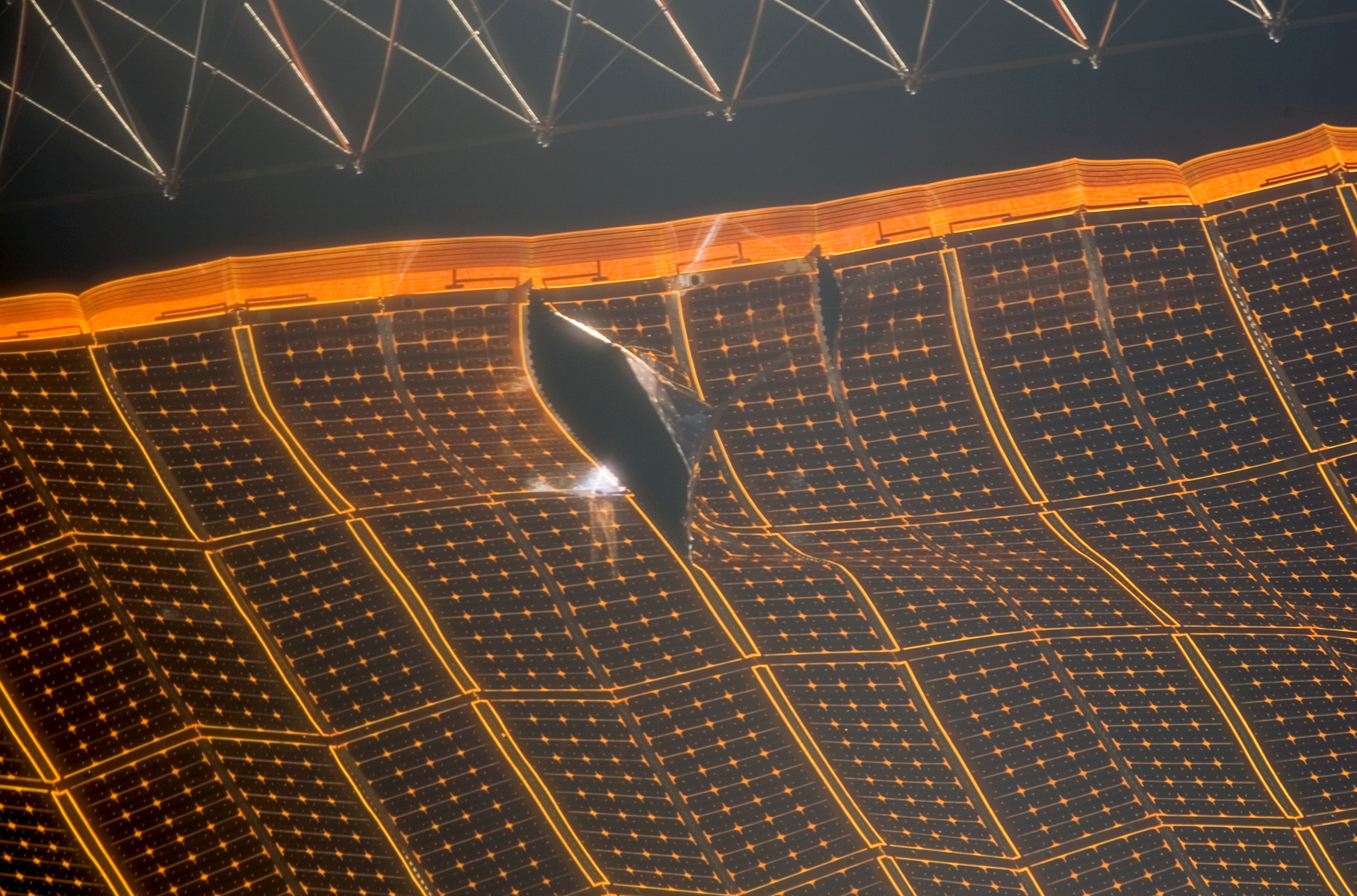
Damage to the 4B wing of the P6 solar array wing found when it was redeployed after being moved to its final position on the STS-120 mission.

Each ISS solar array wing (often abbreviated "SAW") consists of two retractable "blankets" of solar cells with a mast between them. Each wing is the largest ever deployed in space, weighing over 1,088 kilograms (2,399 pounds) and using nearly 33,000 solar arrays, each measuring 8-cm square with 4,100 diodes. When fully extended, each is 35 metres (115 ft) in length and 12 metres (39 ft) wide. Each SAW is capable of generating nearly 31 Kilowatts (kW) of direct current power. When retracted, each wing folds into a solar array blanket box just 51 centimetres (20 in) high and 4.57 metres (15.0 ft) in length.

Altogether, the eight solar array wings can generate about 240 kilowatts in direct sunlight, or about 84 to 120 kilowatts average power (cycling between sunlight and shade).

The solar arrays normally track the Sun, with the "alpha gimbal" used as the primary rotation to follow the Sun as the space station moves around the Earth, and the "beta gimbal" used to adjust for the angle of the space station's orbit to the ecliptic. Several different tracking modes are used in operations, ranging from full Sun-tracking, to the drag-reduction mode (night glider and Sun slicer modes), to a drag-maximization mode used to lower the altitude.

Over time, the photovoltaic cells on the wings have degraded gradually, having been designed for a 15-year service life. This is especially noticeable with the first arrays to launch, with the P6 and P4 Trusses in 2000 (STS-97) and 2006 (STS-115).

STS-117 delivered the S4 truss and solar arrays in 2007.

STS-119 (ISS assembly flight 15A) delivered the S6 truss along with the fourth set of solar arrays and batteries to the station during March 2009.

To augment the oldest wings, NASA launched four pairs of large-scale versions of the ISS Roll Out Solar Array (IROSA) aboard four SpaceX Dragon 2 cargo launches from early June 2021 to mid-October 2026, SpaceX CRS-22, CRS-26, CRS-28 and CRS-35. These arrays were deployed along the central part of the wings up to two thirds of its length. Work to install iROSA's support brackets on the truss mast cans holding the Solar Array Wings was initiated by the crew members of Expedition 64 in late February 2021. After the first pair of arrays were delivered in early June 2021, a spacewalk on 16 June by Shane Kimbrough and Thomas Pesquet of Expedition 65 to place one iROSA on the 2B power channel and mast can of the P6 truss ended early due to technical difficulties with the array's deployment.

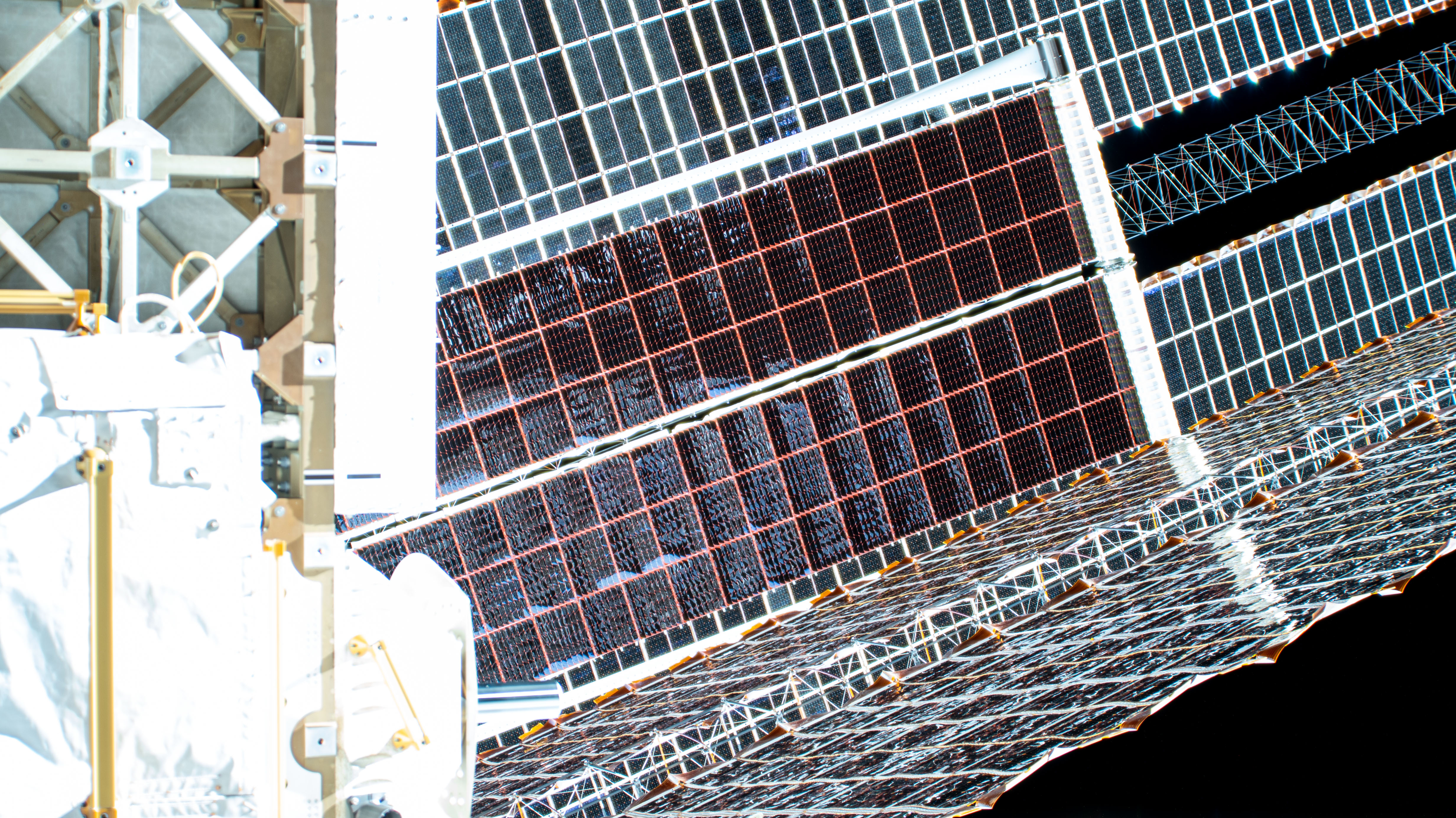
ISS new roll out solar array as seen from a zoom camera on the P6 Truss

The 20 June spacewalk saw the first iROSA's successful deployment and connection to the station's power system. The 25 June spacewalk saw the astronauts successfully install and deploy the second iROSA on the 4B mast can opposite the first iROSA.

The next pair of panels were launched on 26 November 2022. Astronauts Josh Cassada and Frank Rubio of Expedition 68 installed each one on the 3A power channel and mast can on the S4 segment, and the 4A power channel and mast can on the P4 truss segments, on 3 and 22 December 2022, respectively.

The third pair of panels were launched on 5 June 2023. On 9 June, astronauts Steve Bowen and Warren Hoburg of Expedition 69 installed the fifth iROSA on the 1A power channel and mast can on the S4 truss segment. On 15 June, Bowen and Hoburg installed the sixth iROSA on the 1B power channel and mast can on the S6 truss segment.

The last pair of iROSAs, the seventh and eighth, were installed on the 2A and 3B power channels on the P4 and S6 truss segments in fall 2026. Jessica Meir and Christopher Williams of Expedition 74 installed the 2A channel's iROSA bracket on the P4 segment's mast can on 18 March 2026. Expedition 75 astronauts Anil Menon and Joshua Kutryk installed the set of iROSAs on 29 October and 5 November.

== Batteries ==
Since the station is often not in direct sunlight, it relies on rechargeable lithium-ion batteries (initially nickel-hydrogen batteries) to provide continuous power during the "eclipse" part of the orbit (35 minutes of every 90 minute orbit).

Each battery assembly, situated on the S4, P4, S6, and P6 Trusses, consists of 24 lightweight lithium-ion battery cells and associated electrical and mechanical equipment. Each battery assembly has a nameplate capacity of 110 Ah (396,000 C) (originally 81 Ah) and 4 kWh (14 MJ). This power is fed to the ISS via the BCDU and DCSU respectively.

The batteries ensure that the station is never without power to sustain life-support systems and experiments. During the sunlight part of the orbit, the batteries are recharged. The nickel-hydrogen batteries and the battery charge/discharge units were manufactured by Space Systems/Loral (SS/L), under contract to Boeing. Ni-H2 batteries on the P6 truss were replaced in 2009 and 2010 with more Ni-H2 batteries brought by Space Shuttle missions. The nickel-hydrogen batteries had a design life of 6.5 years and could exceed 38,000 charge/discharge cycles at 35% depth of discharge. They were replaced multiple times during the expected 30-year life of the station. Each battery measured 40 by 36 by 18 inches (102 by 91 by 46 cm) and weighed 170 kilograms (370 pounds).

From 2017 to 2021, the nickel-hydrogen batteries were replaced by lithium-ion batteries. On January 6, 2017, Expedition 50 members Shane Kimbrough and Peggy Whitson began the process of converting some of the oldest batteries on the ISS to the new lithium-ion batteries. Expedition 64 members Victor Glover and Michael S. Hopkins concluded the campaign on February 1, 2021. There are a number of differences between the two battery technologies. One difference is that the lithium-ion batteries can handle twice the charge, so only half as many lithium-ion batteries were needed during replacement. Also, the lithium-ion batteries are smaller than the older nickel-hydrogen batteries. Although Li-ion batteries typically have shorter lifetimes than Ni-H2 batteries as they cannot sustain as many charge/discharge cycles before suffering notable degradation, the ISS Li-ion batteries have been designed for 60,000 cycles and ten years of lifetime, much longer than the original Ni-H2 batteries' design life span of 6.5 years.

== Power management and distribution ==
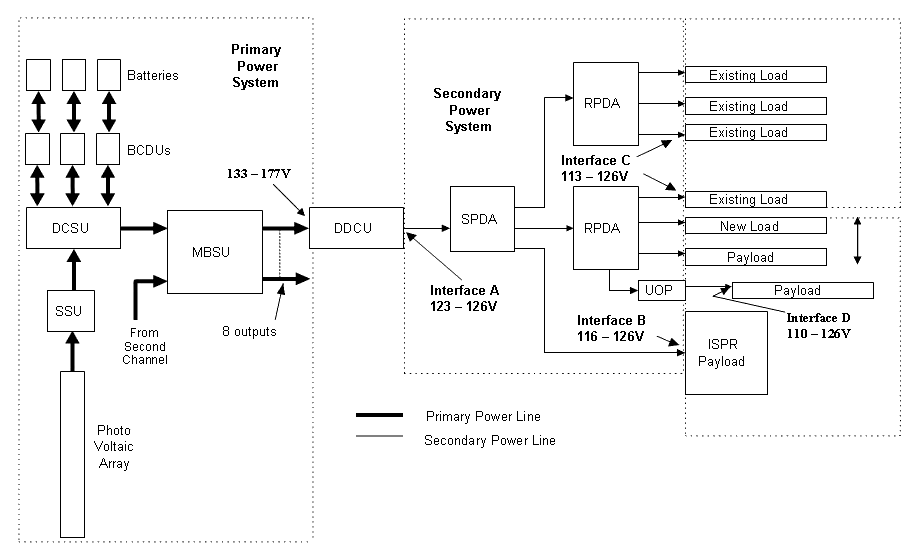
ISS Electrical Power Distribution

The power management and distribution subsystem operates at a primary bus voltage set to V_{mp}, the peak power point of the solar arrays. As of 30 December 2005, V_{mp} was 160 volts DC. It can change over time as the arrays degrade from ionizing radiation. Microprocessor-controlled switches control the distribution of primary power throughout the station.

The battery charge/discharge units (BCDUs) regulate the amount of charge put into the battery. Each BCDU can regulate discharge current from two battery ORUs (each with 38 series-connected Ni-H_{2} cells), and can provide up to 6.6 kW to the Space Station. During insolation, the BCDU provides charge current to the batteries and controls the amount of battery overcharge. Each day, the BCDU and batteries undergo sixteen charge/discharge cycles. The Space Station has 24 BCDUs, each weighing 100 kg. The BCDUs are provided by Space Systems/Loral.

=== Sequential shunt unit (SSU) ===
The design is same as the S3R Solar Array Regulator which was patented by European Space Agency inventors Alan H Weinberg and D O'Sullivan in 1974.

Eighty-two separate solar array strings feed a sequential shunt unit (SSU) that provides coarse voltage regulation at the desired V_{mp}. The SSU applies a "dummy" (resistive) load that increases as the station's load decreases (and vice versa) so the array operates at a constant voltage and load. The SSUs are provided by SS/L.

=== DC-to-DC conversion ===
DC-to-DC converter units supply the secondary power system at a constant 124.5 volts DC, allowing the primary bus voltage to track the peak power point of the solar arrays. The units use the "Weinberg Converter" topology invented by Alan H Weinberg which was published in an ESA conference paper in 1974.

=== Thermal control ===
The thermal control system regulates the temperature of the main power distribution electronics and the batteries and associated control electronics. Details on this subsystem can be found in the article External Active Thermal Control System.

== Station to shuttle power transfer system ==
From 2007 the Station-to-Shuttle Power Transfer System (SSPTS; pronounced spits) allowed a docked Space Shuttle to make use of power provided by the International Space Station's solar arrays. Use of this system reduced usage of a shuttle's on-board power-generating fuel cells, allowing it to stay docked to the space station for an additional four days.

SSPTS was a shuttle upgrade that replaced the Assembly Power Converter Unit (APCU) with a new device called the Power Transfer Unit (PTU). The APCU had the capacity to convert shuttle 28 VDC main bus power to 124 VDC compatible with ISS's 120 VDC power system. This was used in the initial construction of the space station to augment the power available from the Russian Zvezda service module. The PTU adds to this the capability to convert the 120 VDC supplied by the ISS to the orbiter's 28 VDC main bus power. It is capable of transferring up to 8 kW of power from the space station to the orbiter. With this upgrade both the shuttle and the ISS were able to use each other's power systems when needed, though the ISS never again required the use of an orbiter's power systems.

In December 2006, during mission STS-116, PMA-2 (then at the forward end of the Destiny module) was rewired to allow for the use of the SSPTS. The first mission to make actual use of the system was STS-118 with Space Shuttle Endeavour.

Only Discovery and Endeavour were equipped with the SSPTS. Atlantis was the only surviving shuttle not equipped with the SSPTS, so it could only go on shorter length missions than the rest of the fleet.
