= Timothy Kopra =

American astronaut (born 1963)

Tim Kopra
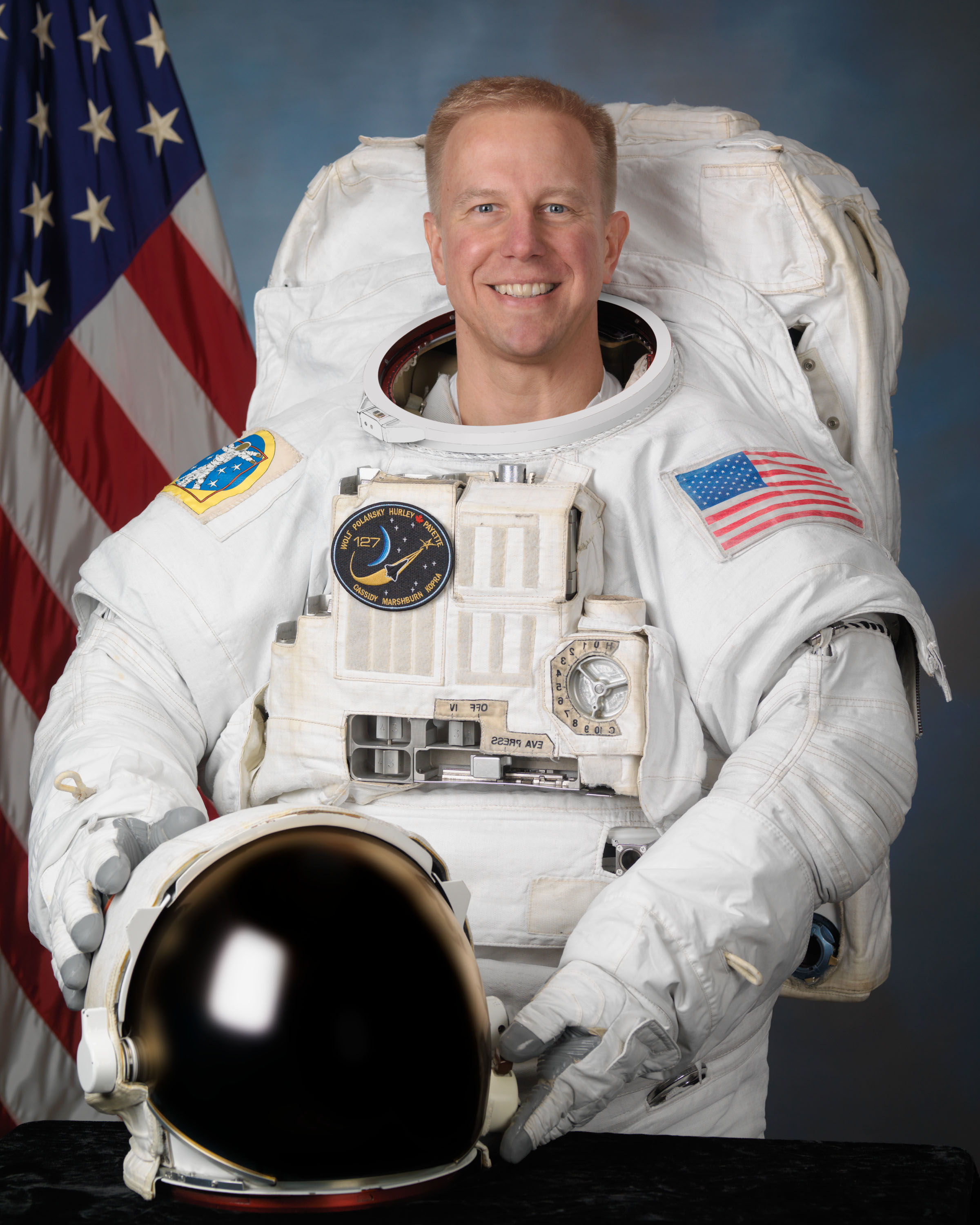
- Official portrait, 2008
- Born: Timothy Lennart Kopra; April 9, 1963 (age 63); Austin, Texas, U.S.
- Education: United States Military Academy (BS); Georgia Institute of Technology (MS); United States Army War College (MS); University of London (MBA); Columbia University (MBA)
- Space career

NASA astronaut
- Rank: Colonel, USA
- Time in space: 244d 1h 1m
- Selection: NASA Group 18 (2000)
- Total EVAs: 3
- Total EVA time: 13h 31m
- Mission: STS-127/128 (Expedition 20); Soyuz TMA-19M (Expedition 46/47)
- Retired: October 1, 2018

Timothy Lennart Kopra (born April 9, 1963) is an American engineer, a former colonel in the United States Army, and a retired NASA astronaut. He served aboard the International Space Station as a flight engineer for Expedition 20, returning to Earth aboard Space Shuttle Discovery on the STS-128 mission on September 11, 2009. He returned to the ISS for the second time in December 2015, as part of Expedition 46 and as the commander of Expedition 47.

In 2020, he was announced as the vice president of robotics and space operations at MDA Corporation.

== Personal ==
Kopra was born in Austin, Texas. Kopra is married to Dawn Kaye Lehman of Lewisburg, Kentucky, and they have two children, Matthew and Jacqueline. His mother, Martha A. Witthoft Kopra, resides in Austin, Texas. His father, Dr. Lennart L. Kopra, died December 8, 1998. He is of Finnish descent on his father's side. His grandfather, Antti Kopra, born in Laavola, Valkjärvi, Karelia, and his grandmother, Ester Elisabet Saksinen, born in Helsinki, left Finland in 1914, immigrating to the United States. Kopra's father spoke Finnish, but Tim does not speak the language. On his mother's side, Kopra is of German descent. His German ancestors arrived in New York in the colonial period in the 1700s. These ancestors include Johann Philipp and Anna Catharina Finckel, who were members of the first group of Palatine Germans who settled in Germantown in the Hudson Valley in 1710. In 1981, Kopra was photographed singing on stage and playing trombone for Austin, Texas punk funk band Big Boys.

== Education ==
- 1981: Graduated from McCallum High School, Austin, Texas
- 1985: Received a Bachelor of Science degree from the United States Military Academy, West Point, New York
- 1995: Received a Master of Science degree in aerospace engineering, Georgia Institute of Technology
- 2006: Received a Master of Strategic Studies degree from the United States Army War College
- 2013: Received a Master of Business Administration degree from the London Business School of the University of London
- 2013: Received a Master of Business Administration degree from the Columbia Business School.

== Organizations ==
- Society of Experimental Test Pilots
- Army Aviation Association of America
- American Helicopter Society
- United States Military Academy Association of Graduates
- West Point Society of Greater Houston
- Phi Kappa Phi

== Awards and honors ==
- Empire Test Pilot School Award for the best developmental test thesis, Class 110, U.S. Naval Test Pilot School (1996),
- Silver and Bronze Order of Saint Michael, Army Aviation Award (2009, 1999),
- Awarded the Bronze Star, two Meritorious Service Medals, Air Medal, Army Commendation Medal, Army Achievement Medal, NASA Space Flight Medal, NASA Distinguished Service Medal, and various other service awards.

== Military career ==
Kopra received his commission as a second lieutenant from the U.S. Military Academy in May 1985 and was designated as an Army aviator in August 1986. He then completed a three-year assignment at Fort Campbell, Kentucky, where he served as an aeroscout platoon leader, troop executive officer, and squadron adjutant in the 101st Airborne Division's air cavalry squadron. In 1990, he was assigned to the 3rd Armored Division in Hanau, Germany, and was deployed to the Middle East in support of Operations Desert Shield and Desert Storm. He completed his tour in Germany as an attack helicopter company commander and an operations officer. Kopra retired from the U.S. Army in November 2010.

== NASA career ==
Kopra was assigned to NASA at the Johnson Space Center in September 1998 as a vehicle integration test engineer. In this position, he primarily served as an engineering liaison for Space Shuttle launch operations and International Space Station hardware testing. He was actively involved in the contractor tests of the Extravehicular Activity (EVA) interfaces for each of the space station truss segments. Selected as a mission specialist by NASA in July 2000, Kopra reported for Astronaut Candidate Training the following month. He then completed the initial two years of intensive Space Shuttle and ISS training, scientific and technical briefings, and T-38 flight training. Kopra was also assigned technical duties in the Space Station Branch of the Astronaut Office, where his primary focus was the testing of crew interfaces for two future ISS modules as well as the implementation of support computers and operational Local Area Network on International Space Station.

In September 2006, Kopra served as an aquanaut during the NEEMO 11 mission aboard the Aquarius underwater laboratory, living and working underwater for seven days.

=== Expedition 20 ===
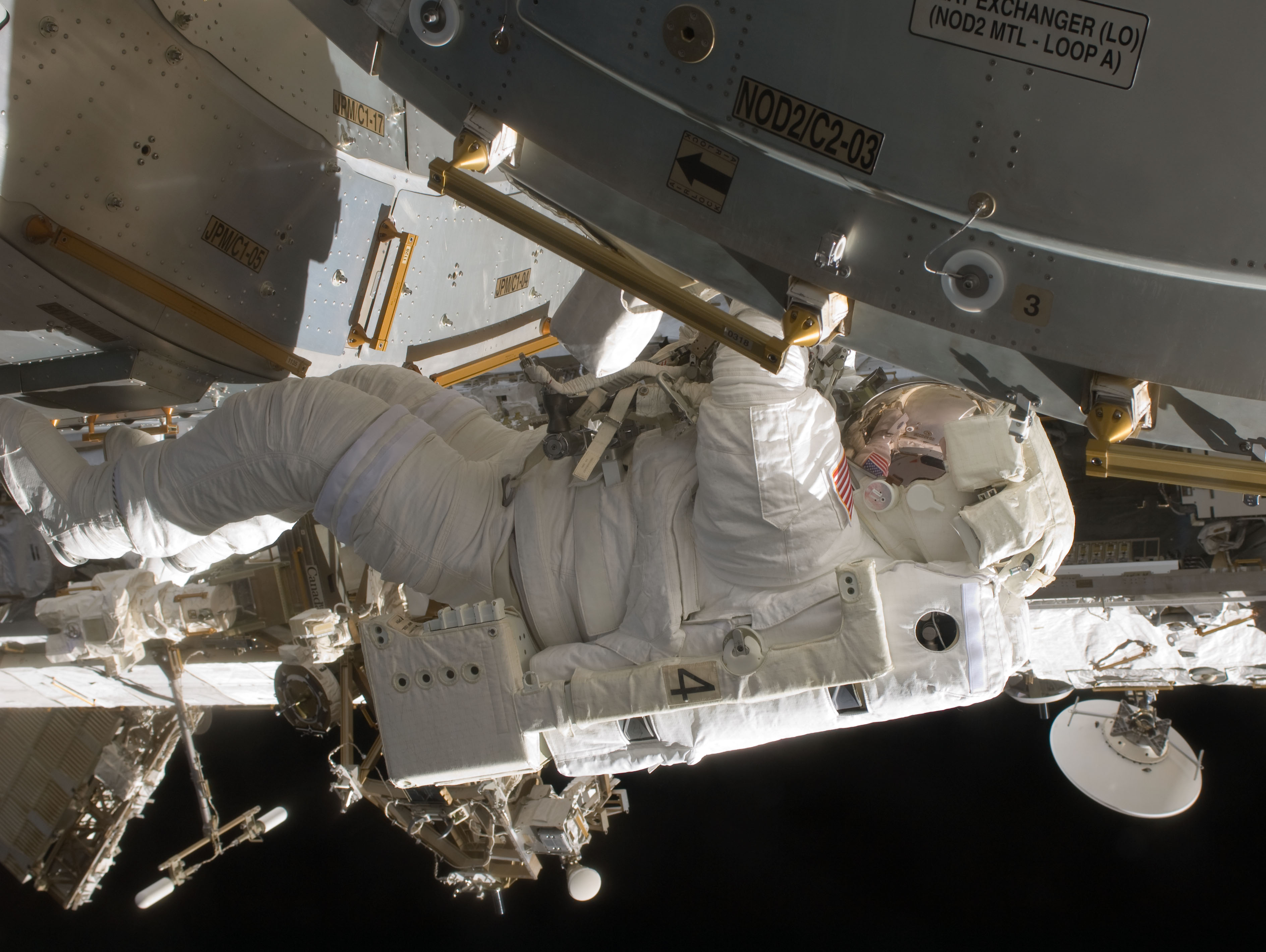
Kopra making a spacewalk during the STS-127 mission.

Kopra spent a little less than 60 days as a flight engineer of Expedition 20 on the ISS, arriving aboard the station aboard space shuttle Endeavour on the STS-127 mission and returning to Earth aboard space shuttle Discovery on the STS-128 mission. He participated in the first spacewalk of the STS-127 mission.

Kopra was assigned to fly on STS-133, the final flight of the Discovery. He lost that assignment when he was injured in a bicycle accident, possibly breaking his hip. He was replaced by Stephen G. Bowen.

=== Expedition 46/47 ===
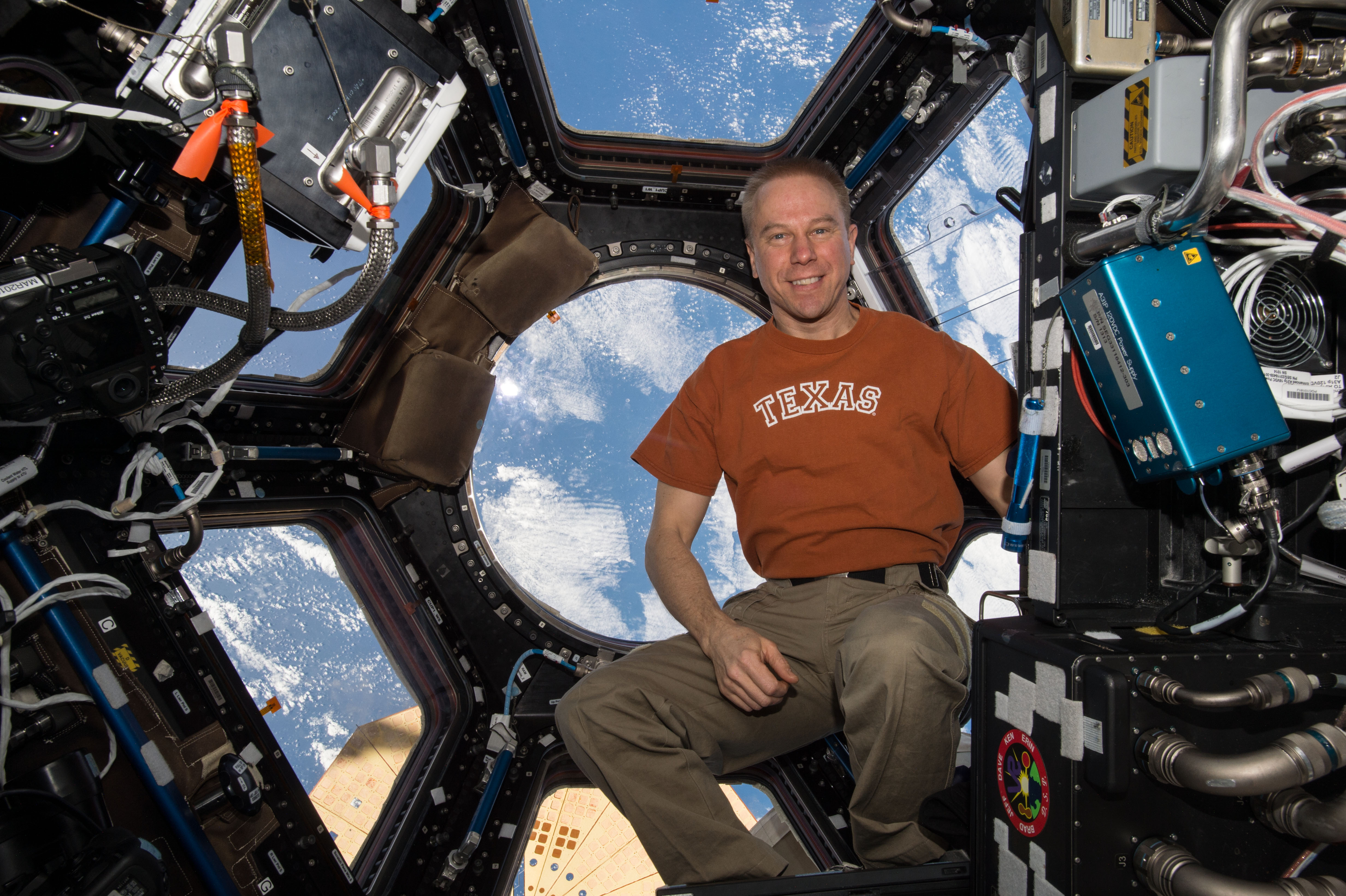
Kopra in the Cupola

Kopra served as commander of the ISS, with Soyuz TMA-19M, as part of Expedition 46/47. During a spacewalk on January 15, 2016, Kopra's spacesuit began to leak water into his helmet causing the walk to be cut short. The suit he was using is the same suit that had developed a more serious water leak during a spacewalk by Italian astronaut Luca Parmitano. Kopra returned to Earth on Soyuz TMA-19M and landed 18 June 2016 09:15 UTC, after spending 186 days in space.

== Awards ==
Ribbon	Description	Notes
	Bronze Star Medal	
	Meritorious Service Medal	with oak leaf clusters
	Air Medal	
	Army Commendation Medal	
	Army Achievement Medal	
	NASA Distinguished Service Medal	
	NASA Space Flight Medal	
	National Defense Service Medal	with one service star
	Southwest Asia Service Medal	
	Army Service Ribbon	
	Army Overseas Service Ribbon	

Preceded by Scott J. Kelly	ISS Expedition Commander; March 1, 2016, to June 18, 2016	Succeeded by Jeffrey Williams
