= Expedition 30 =

30th long-duration mission to the International Space Station

- Promotional Poster
- Mission type: Long-duration expedition
- Mission duration: 158 days, 8 hours, 15 minutes

Expedition
- Space station: International Space Station
- Began: 21 November 2011, 23:00 UTC
- Ended: 27 April 2012, 08:15 UTC
- Arrived aboard: Soyuz TMA-22; Soyuz TMA-03M
- Departed aboard: Soyuz TMA-22; Soyuz TMA-03M

Crew
- Crew size: 6
- Members: Expedition 29/30: Dan Burbank; Anton Shkaplerov; Anatoli Ivanishin Expedition 30/31: Oleg Kononenko; André Kuipers; Don Pettit
- EVAs: 1
- EVA duration: 6 hours, 15 minutes
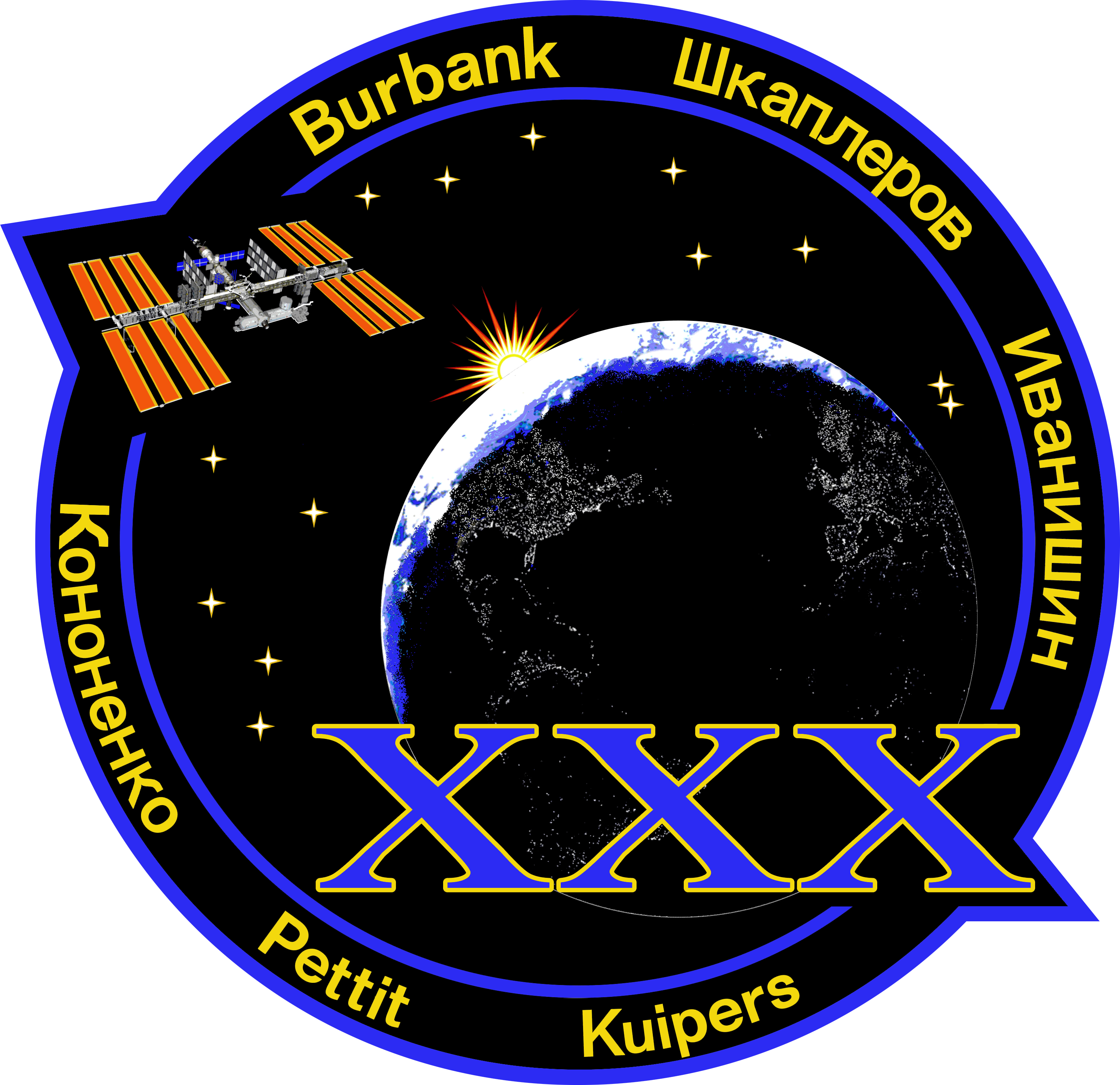
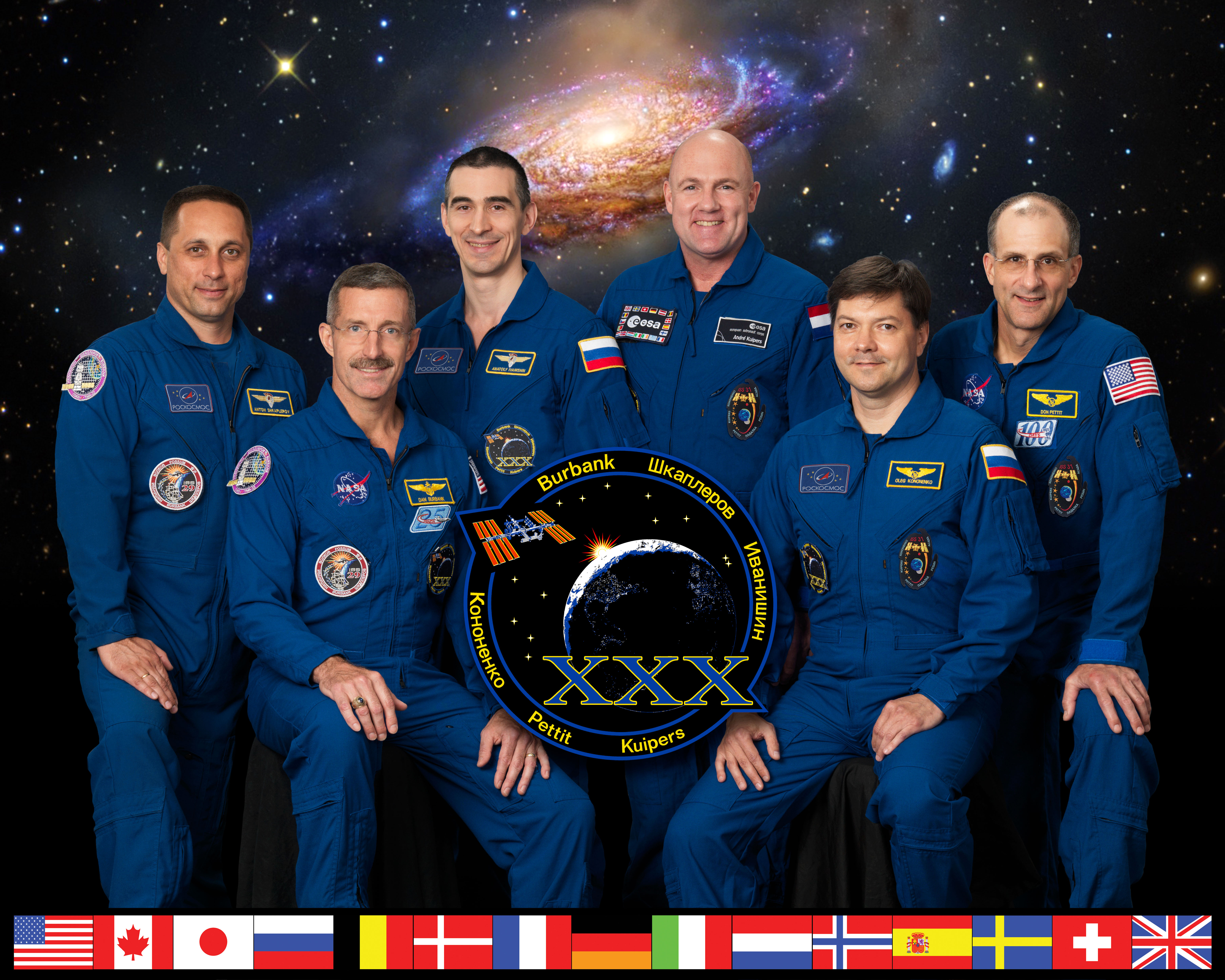
- Expedition 30 mission patch (l-r) Shkaplerov, Burbank, Ivanishin, Kuipers, Kononenko and Pettit ISS expeditions

Expedition 30 was the 30th long-duration mission to the International Space Station (ISS). The expedition's first three crew members – Dan Burbank, Anton Shkaplerov and Anatoli Ivanishin – arrived on the ISS aboard Soyuz TMA-22 on 16 November 2011, during the last phase of Expedition 29. Expedition 30 formally began on 21 November 2011, with the departure from the ISS of the Soyuz TMA-02M spacecraft. The expedition ended on 27 April 2012, as Burbank, Shkaplerov and Ivanishin departed from the ISS aboard Soyuz TMA-22, marking the beginning of Expedition 31.

== Crew ==
Position	First part (November 2011 to December 2011)	Second part (December 2011 to April 2012)
Commander	Dan Burbank, NASA; Third and last spaceflight	
Flight Engineer 1	Anton Shkaplerov, RSA; First spaceflight	
Flight Engineer 2	Anatoli Ivanishin, RSA; First spaceflight	
Flight Engineer 3		Oleg Kononenko, RSA; Second spaceflight
Flight Engineer 4		André Kuipers, ESA; Second and last spaceflight
Flight Engineer 5		Don Pettit, NASA; Third spaceflight

Source
NASA, ESA

== Mission highlights ==
=== Soyuz TMA-02M departure ===
Expedition 30 began with the departure of the Expedition 28/29 crew on board the Soyuz TMA-02M spacecraft, on 21 November 2011 at 23:00 UTC. This left the Expedition 29/30 crew, who had docked with the ISS in the Soyuz TMA-22 spacecraft on 16 November 2011 at 05:24 UTC, on board the station. Soyuz TMA-22 launched on 14 November 2011 at 04:14 UTC, from Baikonur Cosmodrome in Kazakhstan.

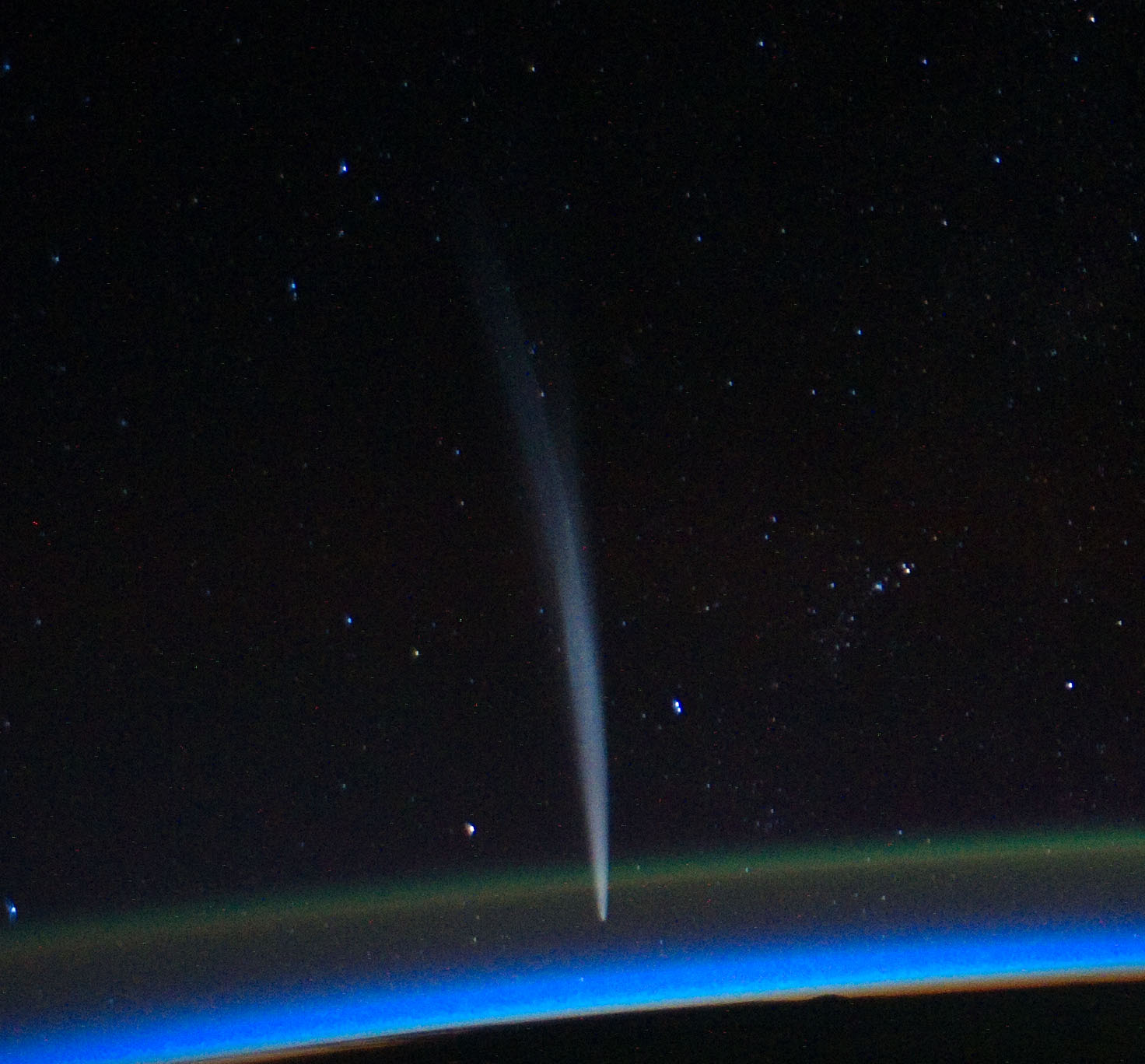
Comet Lovejoy, as seen from the ISS on 21 December 2011.

=== Soyuz TMA-03M arrival ===
The ISS was crewed by the first three Expedition 30 crewmembers for approximately five and a half weeks. They were joined on 23 December 2011 by the Expedition 30/31 crew, who were carried to the ISS by the Soyuz TMA-03M spacecraft. Soyuz TMA-03M was launched on 21 December 2011 at 13:16 UTC and docked on 23 December at 15:19 UTC.

=== Comet Lovejoy observation ===
On 21 December 2011, Expedition 30 commander Dan Burbank observed a pass of the comet C/2011 W3 Lovejoy. The comet was initially thought to be in a destructive orbit around the Sun, and passed within 140,000 km (87,000 mi) of the Sun's surface. However, the comet ultimately survived its encounter with the Sun.

=== Spacewalk ===
On 16 February 2012, Russian crew members Oleg Kononenko and Anton Shkaplerov performed the first spacewalk of 2012, moving one of the station's Strela cranes from the Pirs module to the Poisk module. The astronauts also installed new debris shields and materials experiments on the exterior of the ISS.

=== Fiftieth anniversary of Friendship 7 ===
On 20 February 2012, the ISS crew commemorated the fiftieth anniversary of John Glenn's first orbital flight in the Project Mercury spacecraft Friendship 7. The crew surprised the 90-year-old Glenn by speaking to him via video link while he was on-stage with NASA Administrator Charlie Bolden at Ohio State University.

=== Edoardo Amaldi ATV docking ===
The European Space Agency's third Automated Transfer Vehicle (ATV), Edoardo Amaldi, was launched on 23 March 2012, and docked successfully with the ISS on 28 March. The robotic ATV carried around 6,595 kilograms (14,539 lb) of propellants, water and dry cargo to the Expedition 30 crew, and also helped boost the station's altitude with its thrusters. The ATV ultimately remained docked until September 2012, whereafter it deorbited and burned up in Earth's atmosphere as planned.

=== Progress M-15M docking ===
Progress M-15M, a Russian unmanned resupply spacecraft, was launched to the ISS from Baikonur Cosmodrome on 20 April 2012. It successfully docked with the station on 22 April. In preparation for the spacecraft's arrival, its predecessor, Progress M-14M, undocked from the ISS on 19 April, having been docked since 28 January.

=== Soyuz TMA-22 departure ===
Expedition 30 ended on 27 April 2012 with the departure of Soyuz TMA-22 from the ISS, carrying astronauts Burbank, Shkaplerov and Ivanishin. The three astronauts landed safely in Kazakhstan at 11:45 AM (GMT), while Kononenko, Kuipers and Pettit remained aboard the station to begin Expedition 31.
