= Daniel C. Burbank =

American astronaut (born 1961)

Daniel Burbank
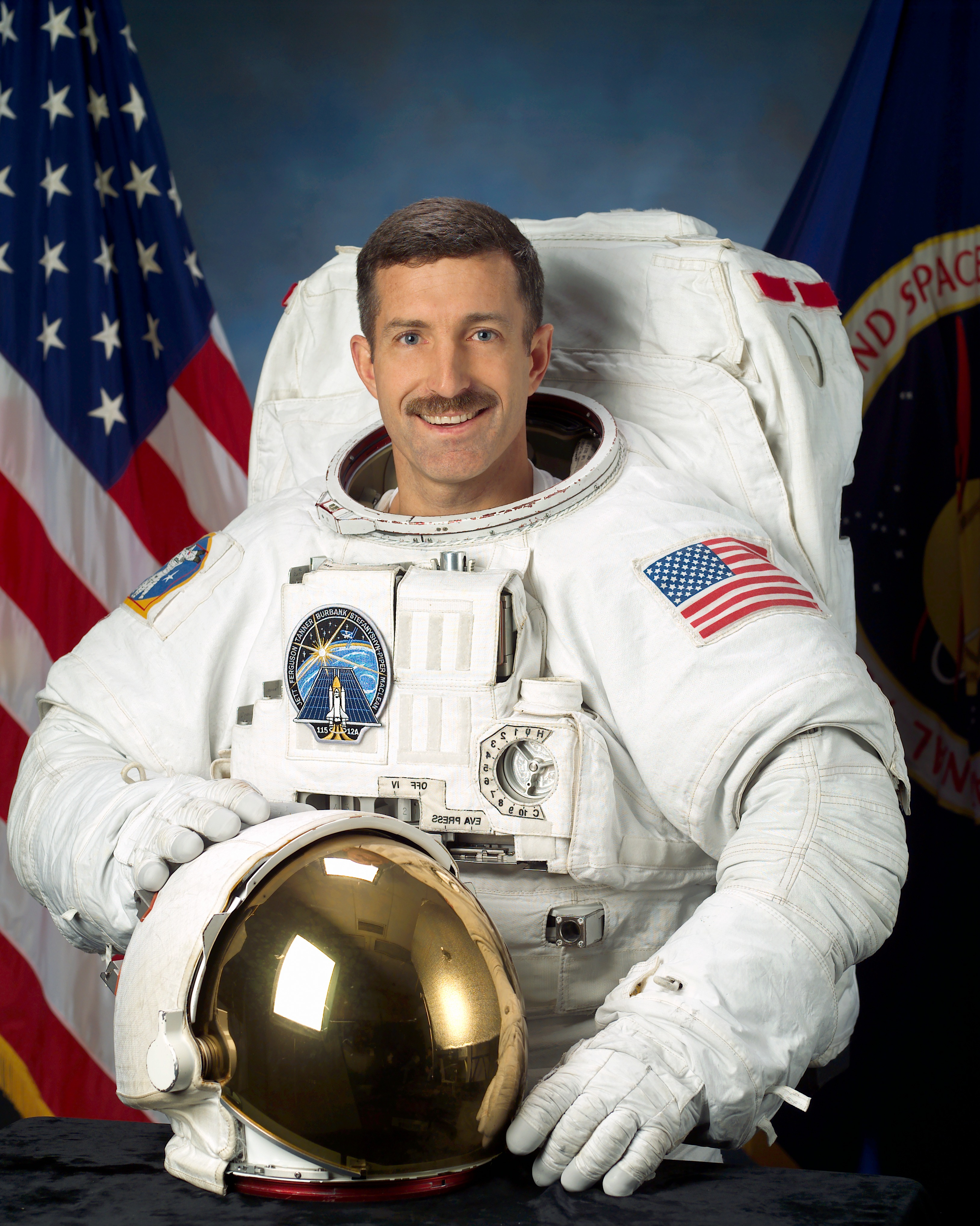
- Born: Daniel Christopher Burbank; July 27, 1961 (age 65); Manchester, Connecticut, U.S.
- Education: Fairfield University; United States Coast Guard Academy (BS); Embry-Riddle Aeronautical University (MS)
- Space career

NASA astronaut
- Rank: Captain, USCG
- Time in space: 188 days, 20 hours, 31 minutes, 50 seconds
- Selection: NASA Group 16 (1996)
- Total EVAs: 1 (during STS-115)
- Total EVA time: 7h, 11m
- Missions: STS-106; STS-115; Soyuz TMA-22 (Expedition 29/30)
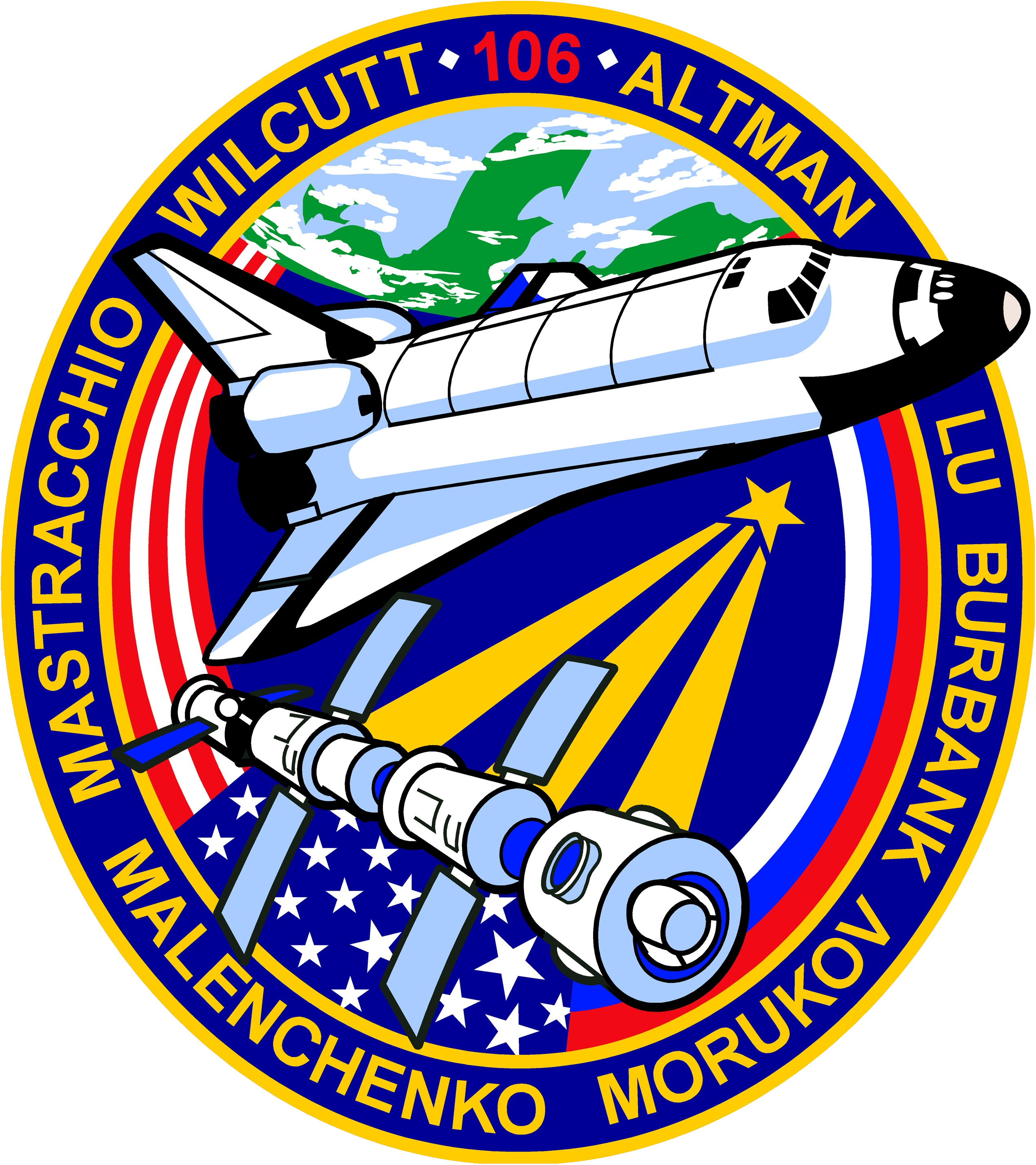
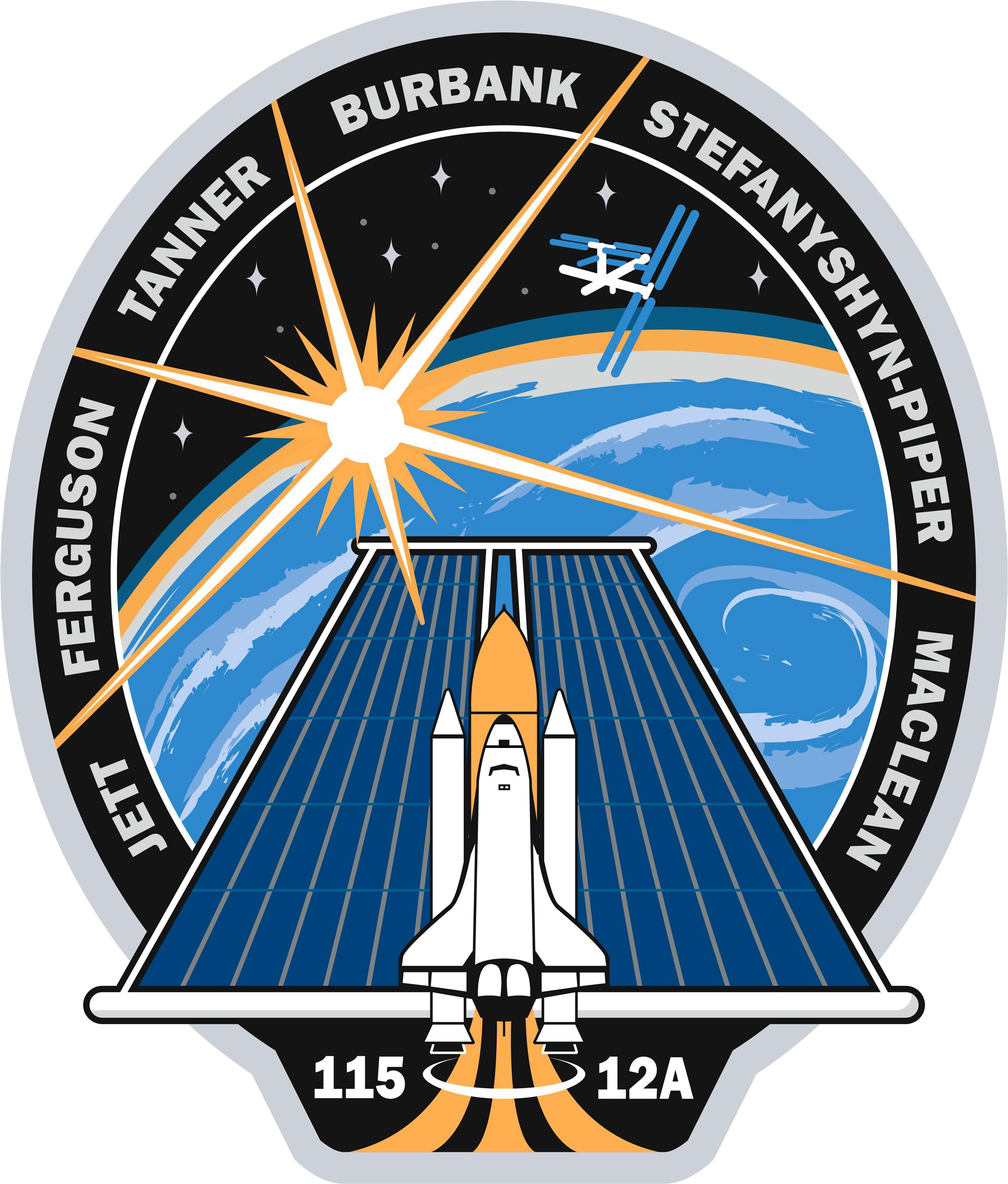
- Mission insignia
- Retired: June 29, 2018

Daniel Christopher Burbank (born July 27, 1961) is a retired American astronaut and a veteran of two Space Shuttle missions. Burbank, a Captain in the United States Coast Guard, is the second Coast Guard astronaut after Bruce Melnick.

== Early life and education ==
Burbank was born in Manchester, Connecticut, and raised in Tolland, Connecticut, where he graduated from Tolland High School. He attended Fairfield University his freshman year before transferring to the United States Coast Guard Academy, where he earned his commission in 1985. In 1987, he went through flight training and became an instructor pilot, serving at various Coast Guard stations at Coast Guard Air Station Elizabeth City, Coast Guard Air Station Cape Cod, and Coast Guard Air Station Sitka. He has a master's degree in aeronautical science from Embry-Riddle Aeronautical University.

== NASA career ==
Selected by NASA in April 1996, Burbank reported to the Johnson Space Center in August 1996. After completing two years of training and evaluation, Burbank worked technical issues for the Astronaut Office Operations Planning Branch, and the International Space Station (ISS) Branch, and served as CAPCOM (spacecraft communicator) for both Space Shuttle and ISS missions. He was also a member of the Space Shuttle Cockpit Avionics Upgrade design team. Twice flown, he served as a mission specialist on STS-106 and STS-115 logging over 23 days in space, and 7 hours and 11 minutes of EVA time. From January 2007 to December 2009, Burbank served as a professor of engineering at the U.S. Coast Guard Academy, where he taught astronomy, aerodynamics, and statics & engineering design. Burbank was assigned to ISS Expedition 29 and Expedition 30 aboard ISS beginning September 2011.

=== Spaceflight experience ===
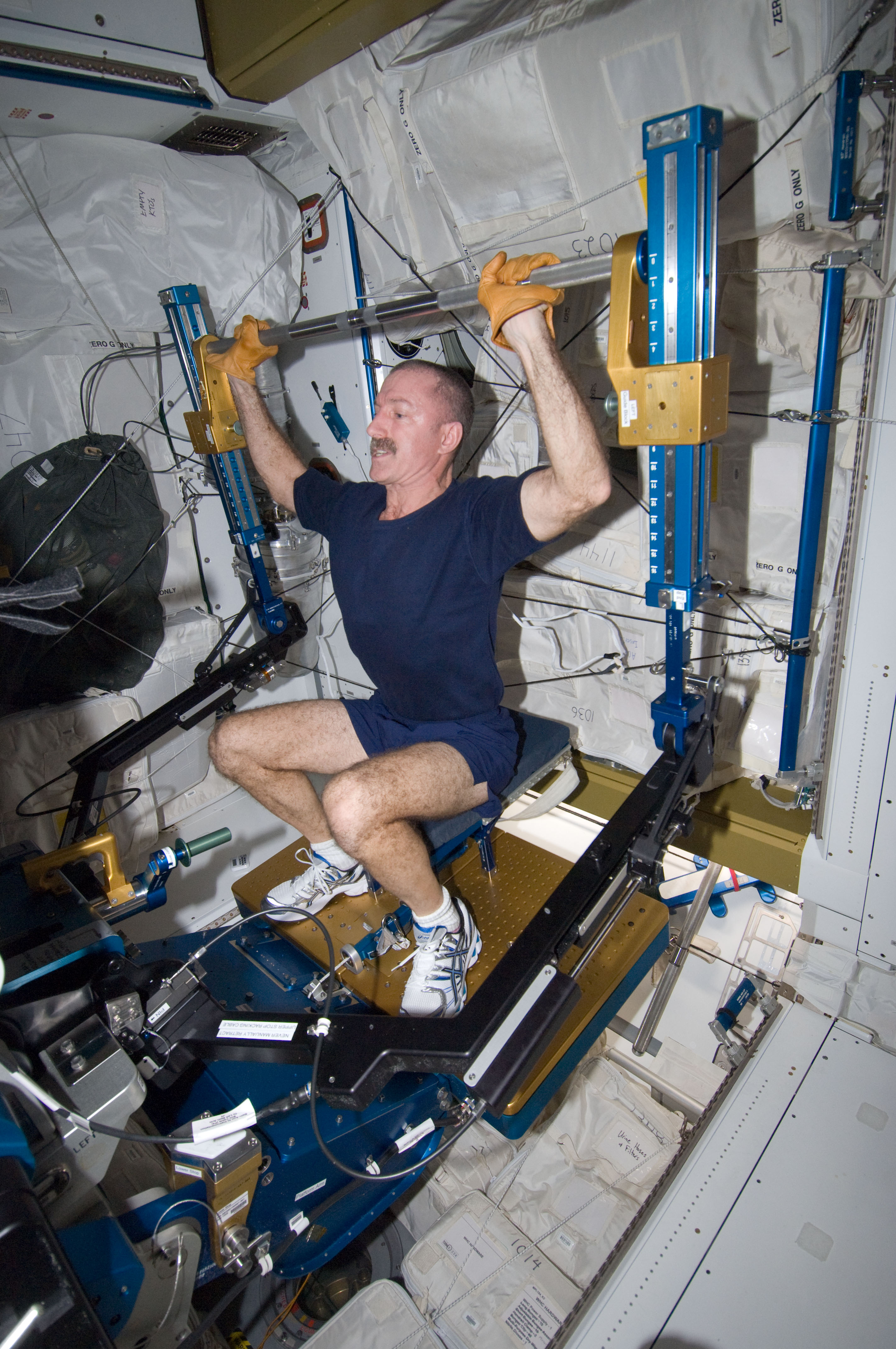
Burbank exercises in the Tranquility module of the International Space Station.

STS-106 Atlantis (September 8–20, 2000). During the 12-day mission, the crew successfully prepared the ISS for the arrival of the first permanent crew. The five astronauts and two cosmonauts delivered more than 6,600 pounds of supplies and installed batteries, power converters, oxygen generation equipment and a treadmill on the ISS. A space walk was performed to connect power and data cables between the newly arrived Service Module and the ISS.

STS-115 Atlantis (September 9–21, 2006) successfully restarted assembly of the ISS. During the 12-day mission, the crew delivered and installed the massive P3/P4 truss, and two sets of solar arrays that provide one quarter of the station's electrical power. The crew also performed unprecedented robotics activity using the Shuttle and ISS robotic arms. Burbank made a seven-hour extravehicular activity (EVA), a.k.a. a "spacewalk," that completed P3/P4 truss installation, activated the solar alpha rotary joint and enabled the solar arrays to be deployed.

Expedition 29 was launched to the ISS along with Russian cosmonauts Anton Shkaplerov, Anatoli Ivanishin and Burbank on November 13, 2011, arriving at the station on November 16, 2011 via Soyuz TMA-22. This expedition spent 66 days in space. Expedition 29 officially ended with the undocking of Soyuz TMA-02M on 21 November 2011.

Expedition 30 Burbank then served as commander of Expedition 30, beginning in November 2011. Burbank, along with Shkaplerov and Ivanishin, returned to Earth on April 27, 2012 after spending an additional 158 days in space.

== Post-NASA career ==
Burbank retired from NASA in June 2018. In 2022, he returned to the U.S. Coast Guard Academy to teach mechanical engineering as a Professor of Practice.

== Awards and decorations ==
Burbank has received the following awards and honors:

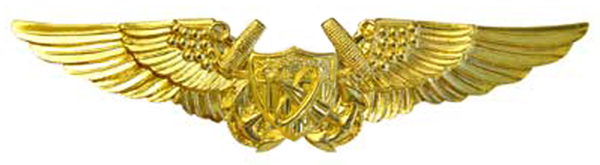
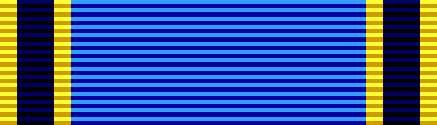
| Coast Guard Astronaut Badge |
| Naval Aviator Badge |
| Defense Superior Service Medal with one oak leaf cluster |
| Legion of Merit |
| Air Medal |
| Coast Guard Commendation Medal with one award star |
| Coast Guard Achievement Medal |
| National Defense Service Medal with one service star |
| Global War on Terrorism Service Medal |
| NASA Distinguished Service Medal |
| NASA Exceptional Service Medal |
| NASA Space Flight Medal with two award stars |

== Personal life ==
Burbank is listed as a member of the astronaut band "Max Q", and a former member of The Idlers. He is a licensed amateur radio operator (ham) with Technician License K1DCB.

| Preceded by Michael Fossum | ISS Expedition Commander; 21 November 2011 to 27 April 2012 | Succeeded by Oleg Kononenko |
