= Expedition 29 =

Long-duration mission to the ISS

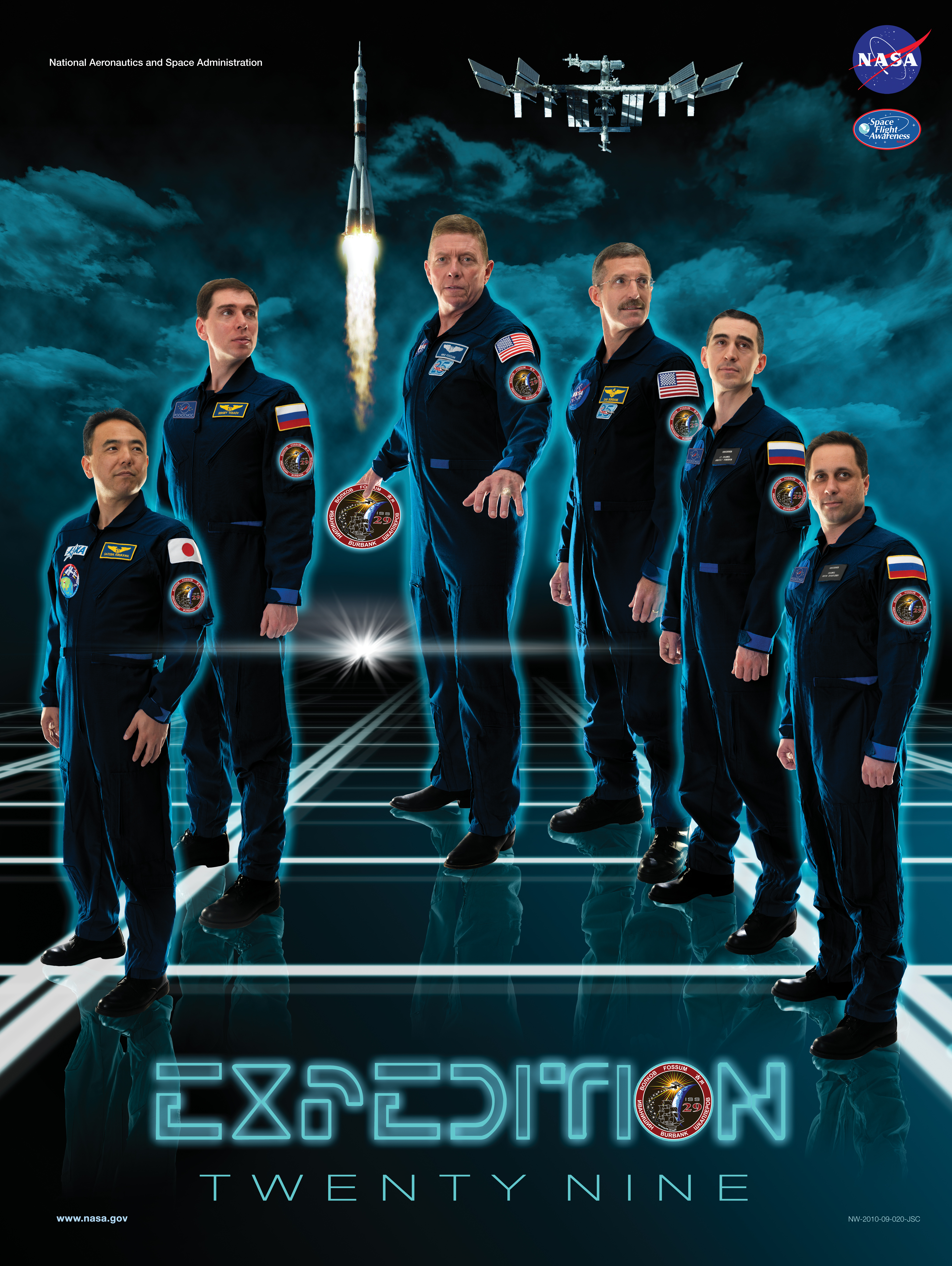
- Promotional poster
- Mission type: Long-duration expedition

Expedition
- Space station: International Space Station
- Began: 16 September 2011, 00:38 UTC
- Ended: 21 November 2011, 23:00 UTC
- Arrived aboard: Soyuz TMA-02M; Soyuz TMA-22
- Departed aboard: Soyuz TMA-02M; Soyuz TMA-22

Crew
- Crew size: 6
- Members: Expedition 28/29: Mike Fossum; Satoshi Furukawa; Sergei Volkov Expedition 29/30: Anton Shkaplerov; Anatoli Ivanishin; Dan Burbank
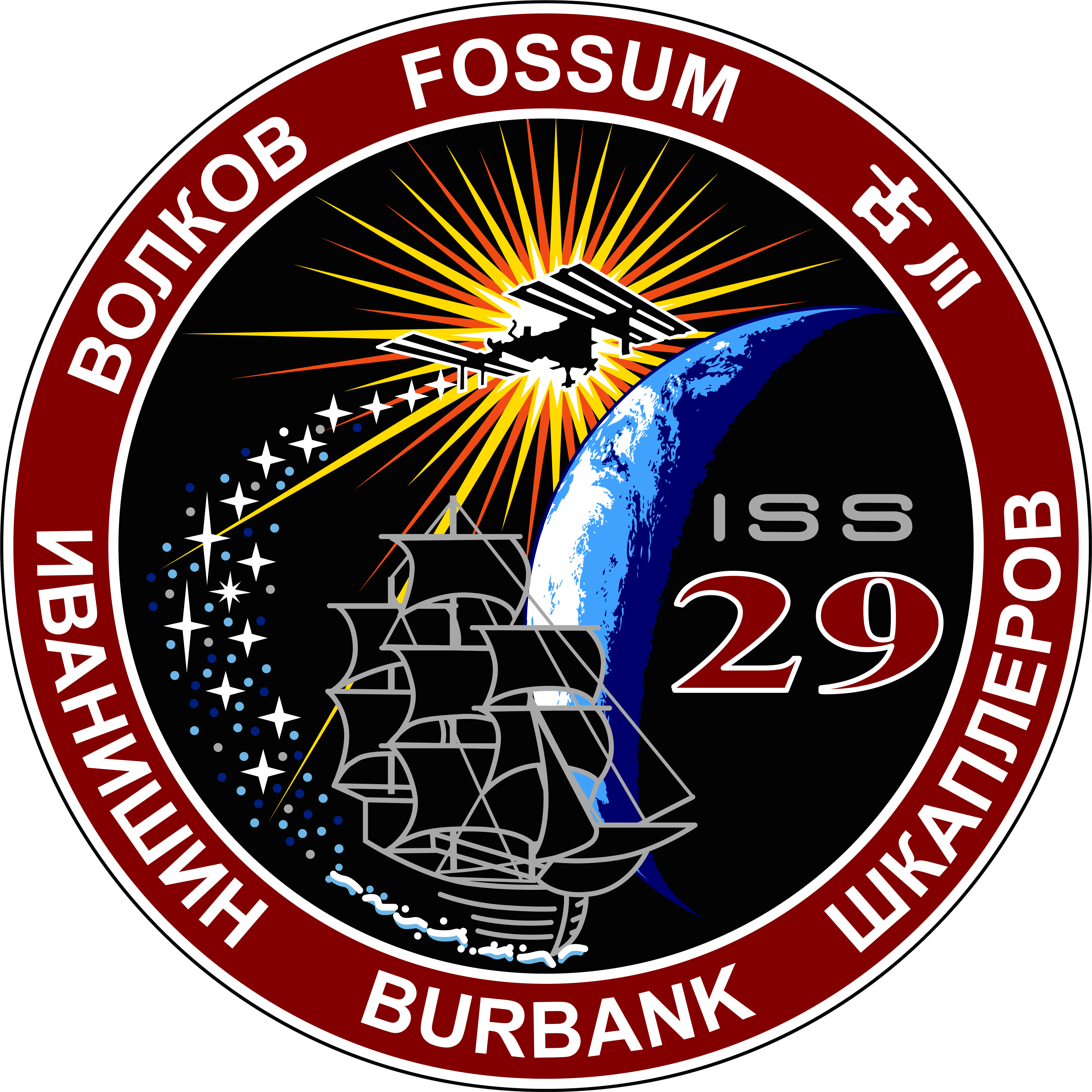
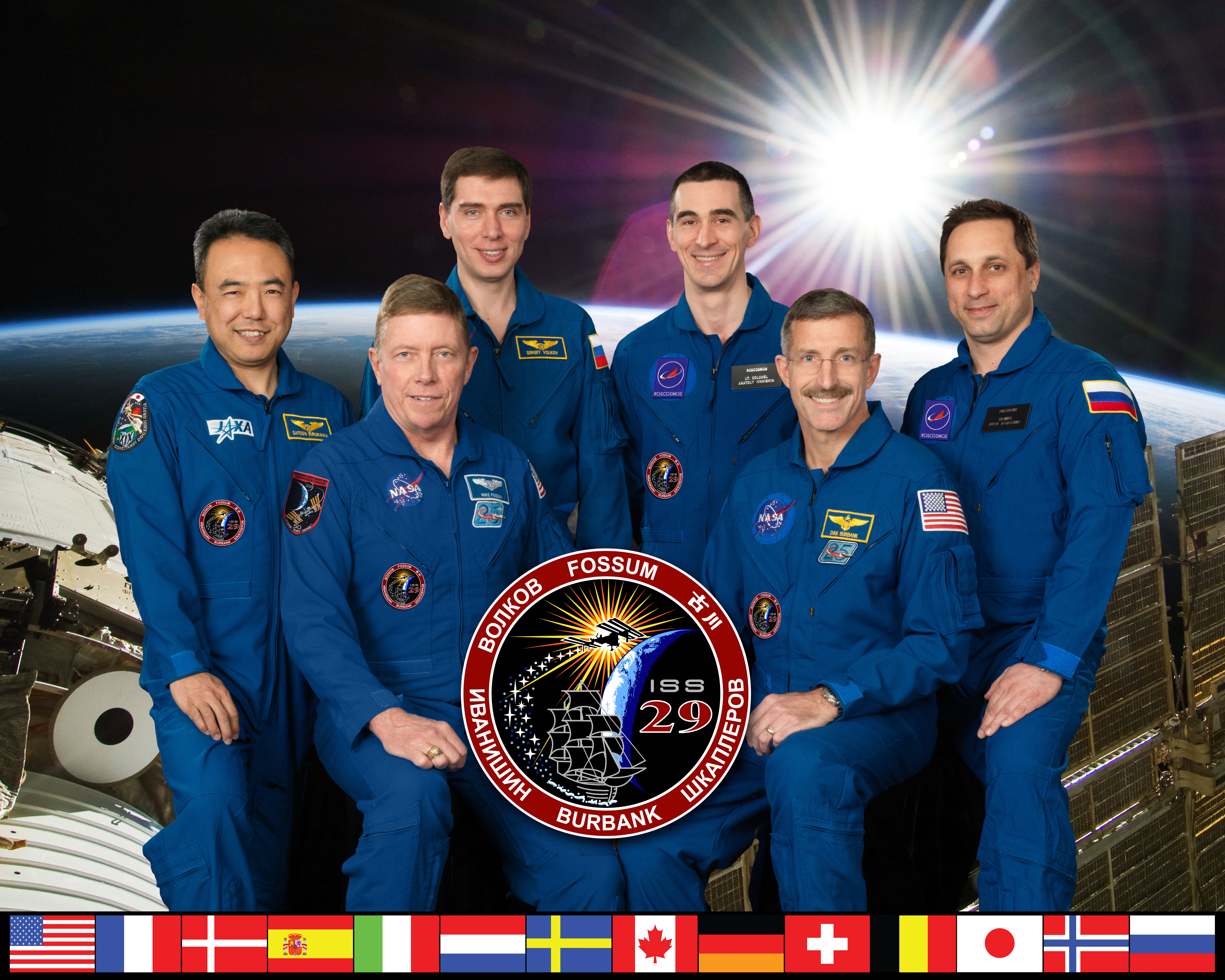
- Expedition 29 mission patch (l-r) Furukawa, Fossum, Volkov, Ivanishin, Burbank and Shkaplerov ISS expeditions

Expedition 29 was the 29th long-duration expedition to the International Space Station (ISS). The expedition formally began on 16 September 2011, with the departure from the ISS of the Soyuz TMA-21 spacecraft. Astronauts Satoshi Furukawa, Michael Fossum and Sergey Volkov, who had arrived at the ISS aboard Soyuz TMA-02M in June 2011, began their Expedition 29 service at this time.

Soyuz TMA-22, which brought the remaining three Expedition 29 crew members to the ISS, was originally scheduled to launch in September 2011, but due to the launch failure of the Progress M-12M resupply vehicle on 24 August, its launch was delayed to 14 November. It docked successfully with the ISS on 16 November 2011.

Expedition 29 officially ended with the undocking of Soyuz TMA-02M on 21 November 2011. Furukawa, Fossum, and Volkov returned to Earth aboard the spacecraft, while astronauts Dan Burbank, Anton Shkaplerov, and Anatoli Ivanishin remained on the ISS as part of Expedition 30.

== Crew ==
Position	First part (September 2011 to November 2011)	Second part (November 2011)
Commander	Mike Fossum, NASA; Third and last spaceflight	
Flight Engineer 1	Satoshi Furukawa, JAXA; First spaceflight	
Flight Engineer 2	Sergei Volkov, RSA; Second spaceflight	
Flight Engineer 3		Anton Shkaplerov, RSA; First spaceflight
Flight Engineer 4		Anatoli Ivanishin, RSA; First spaceflight
Flight Engineer 5		Daniel Burbank, NASA; Third and last spaceflight

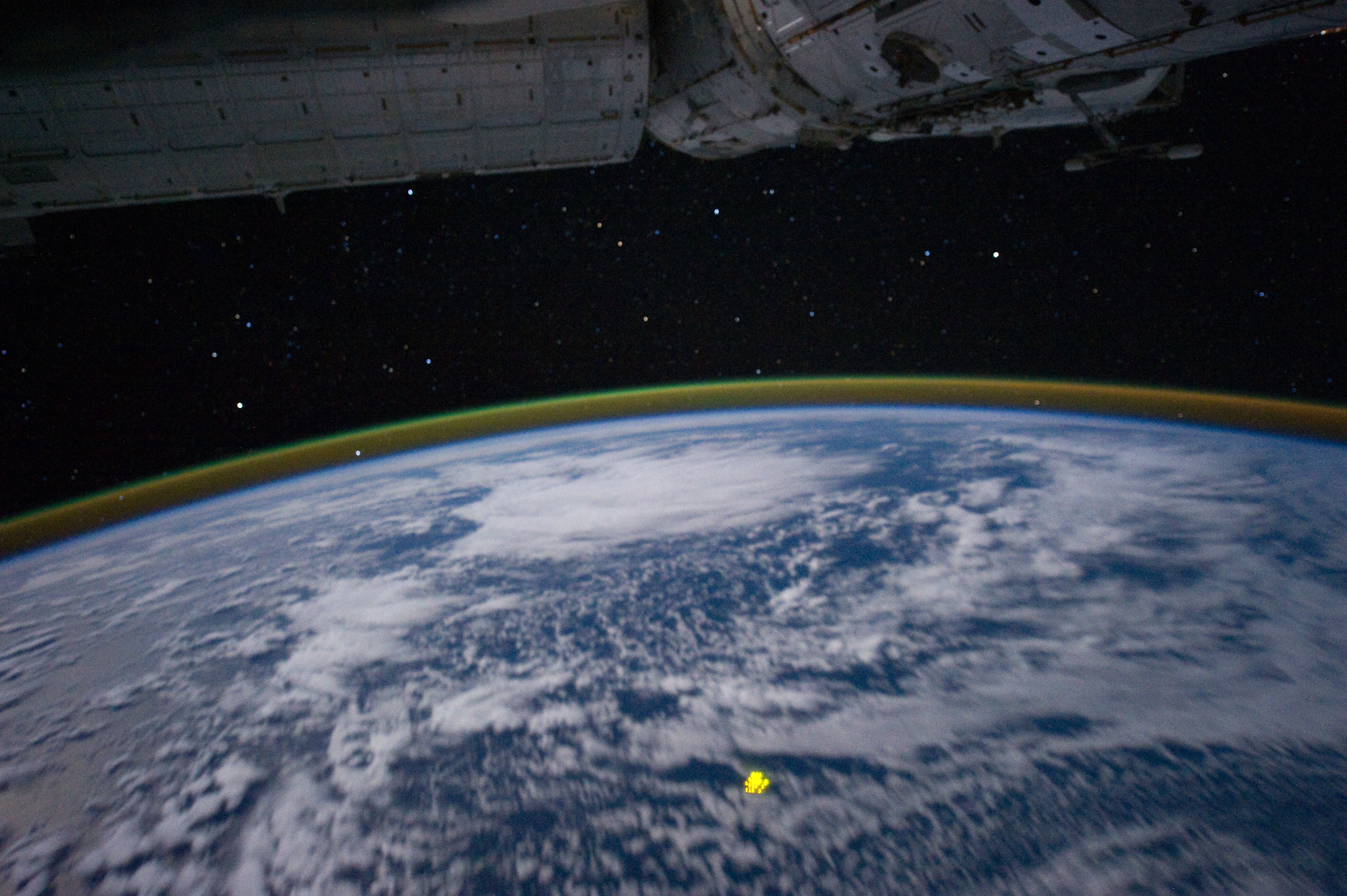
View of Earth taken 16 September 2011 during ISS Expedition 29 from a height of 211 nautical miles (391 km)

NASA

== Mission highlights ==
=== Soyuz TMA-02M launch ===
The expedition's first three crew members launched aboard Soyuz TMA-02M from Baikonur Cosmodrome, Kazakhstan, at 21:18 UTC on 7 June 2011. The crew consisted of Sergey Volkov (Roscosmos), Satoshi Furukawa (JAXA), and Michael Fossum (NASA). Their backups were Oleg Kononenko (Roscosmos), Donald Pettit (NASA), and André Kuipers (ESA). Soyuz TMA-02M docked successfully to the ISS on 9 June 2011, at 5:19 pm EDT.

=== Soyuz TMA-22 launch ===
Soyuz TMA-22 launched from Baikonur Cosmodrome at 04:14 UTC on 14 November 2011, carrying Anton Shkaplerov and Anatoli Ivanishin (Roscosmos), and Daniel Burbank (NASA). The spacecraft was placed into a 250-kilometre (160 mi) parking orbit, and docked successfully with the ISS at 5:24 am GMT on 16 November 2011.

=== Departure of Soyuz TMA-02M ===
Expedition 29 concluded with the departure of Soyuz TMA-02M from the ISS at 11:00 pm GMT on 21 November 2011, carrying astronauts Fossum, Volkov and Furukawa. The spacecraft soft-landed safely (albeit on its side) in Kazakhstan at 2:26 am GMT on 22 November.
