= Soyuz MS-19 =

2021 Russian crewed spaceflight to the ISS

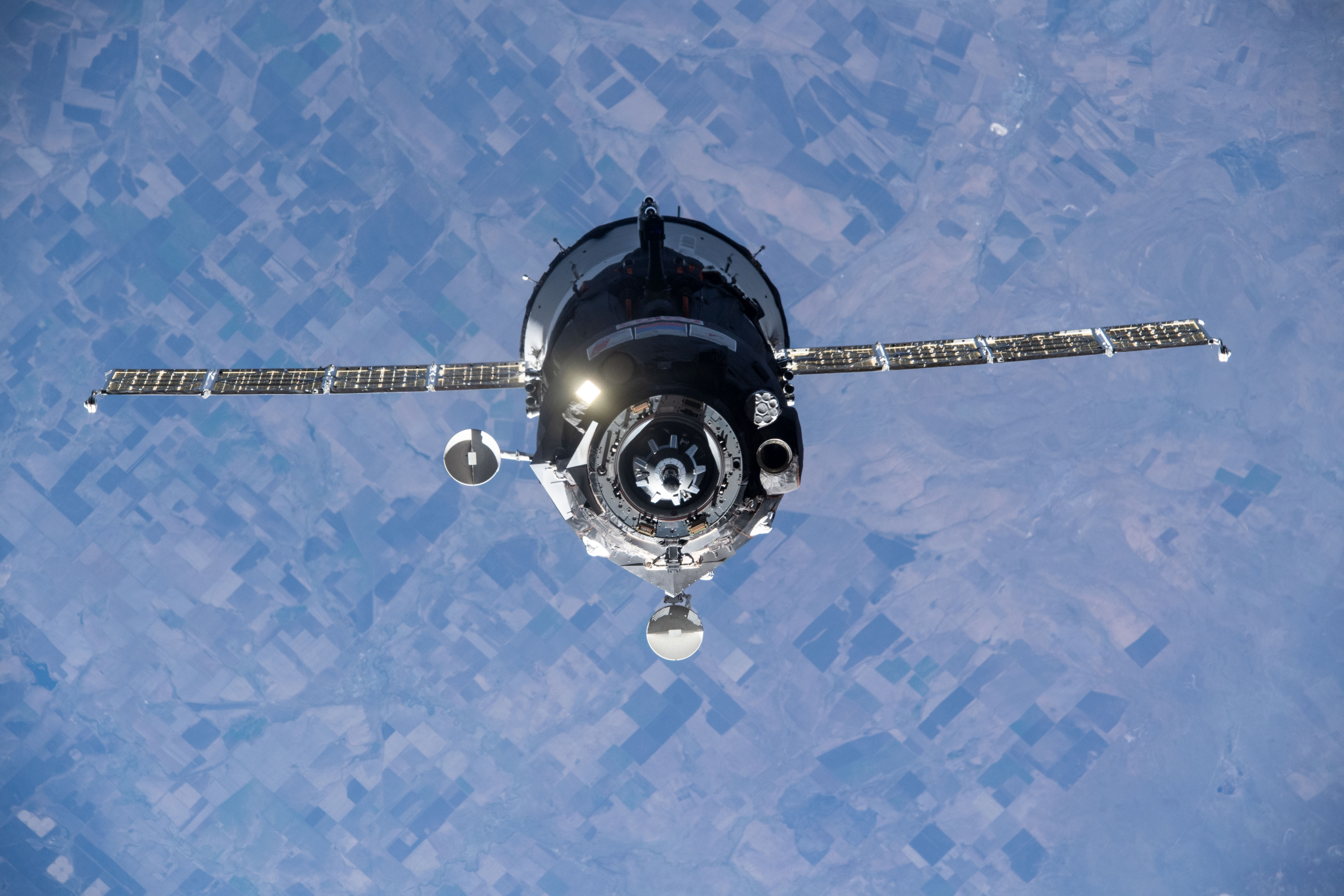
- Soyuz MS-19 arriving at the International Space Station
- Names: ISS 65S
- Mission type: ISS crew transport
- Operator: Roscosmos
- COSPAR ID: 2021-089A
- SATCAT no.: 49269
- Mission duration: 176 days, 2 hours and 33 minutes

Spacecraft properties
- Spacecraft: Soyuz MS-19 No. 749 Astraeus
- Spacecraft type: Soyuz MS
- Manufacturer: Energia

Crew
- Crew size: 3
- Members: Anton Shkaplerov
- Launching: Klim Shipenko; Yulia Peresild
- Landing: Pyotr Dubrov; Mark T. Vande Hei

Start of mission
- Launch date: 5 October 2021, 08:55:02 UTC
- Rocket: Soyuz-2.1a
- Launch site: Baikonur, Site 31
- Contractor: RKTs Progress

End of mission
- Landing date: 30 March 2022, 11:28:26 UTC
- Landing site: 147 km southeast of Zhezkazgan

Orbital parameters
- Reference system: Geocentric orbit
- Regime: Low Earth orbit
- Inclination: 51.66°

Docking with ISS
- Docking port: Rassvet nadir
- Docking date: 5 October 2021, 12:22:31 UTC
- Undocking date: 30 March 2022 07:21:03 UTC
- Time docked: 175 days, 18 hours and 58 minutes
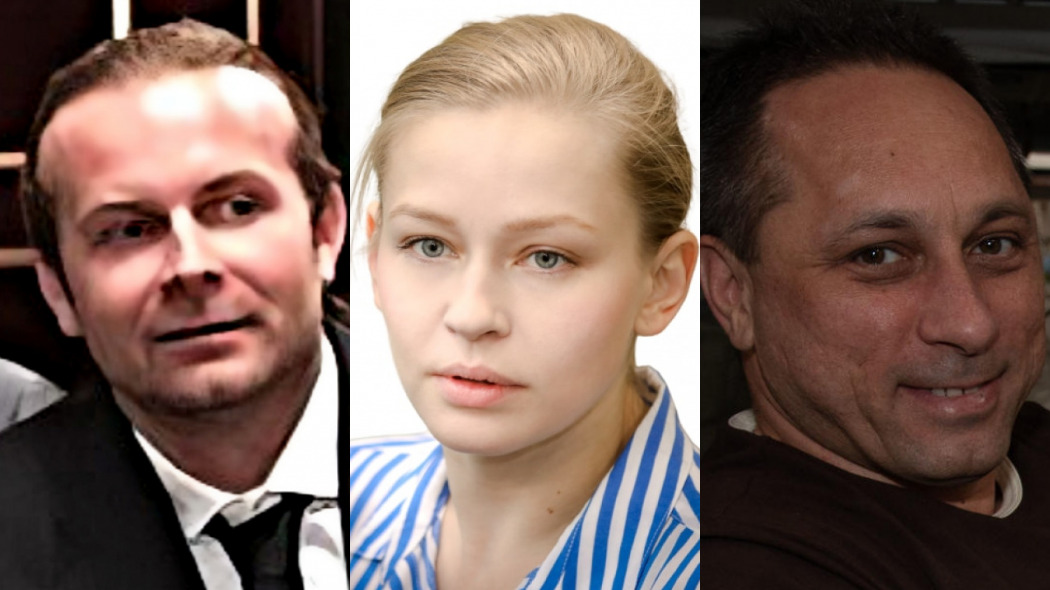
- Launch mission patch Launching crew, from left: Shipenko, Peresild and Shkaplerov Soyuz programme (crewed)

Soyuz MS-19 was a Soyuz spaceflight which launched on 5 October 2021, at 08:55:02 UTC. It was the 147th flight of a crewed Soyuz spacecraft. The launching crew consisted of Russian commander Anton Shkaplerov, Russian film director Klim Shipenko and Russian actress Yulia Peresild. Shipenko and Peresild spent about twelve days on the International Space Station before returning to Earth aboard Soyuz MS-18, while filming a movie in space, The Challenge (Russian: Вызов, romanized: Vyzov). The MS-18 flight launched two crew members of the Expedition 66. Without an American astronaut, this launch marked the first time in more than 21 years (since Soyuz TM-30 in 2000) that a Soyuz crew only included Russian cosmonauts and travelers and the ship had to be upgraded to be piloted by a single person at launch. This is also the first mission to the ISS with an entirely Russian crew.

== Crew ==
Prime crew
Position	Launching crew member	Landing crew member
Commander	Anton Shkaplerov, Roscosmos; Expedition 65/66; Fourth and last spaceflight	
Spaceflight Participant/Flight engineer	Klim Shipenko; Only spaceflight Sponsor: Channel 1	Pyotr Dubrov, Roscosmos; Expedition 64/65/66; First spaceflight
Spaceflight Participant/Flight engineer	Yulia Peresild; Only spaceflight Sponsor: Channel 1	Mark T. Vande Hei, NASA; Expedition 64/65/66; Second spaceflight
Shipenko and Peresild visited the ISS to film the movie The Challenge.

Backup crew
Position	Crew member
Commander	Oleg Artemyev, Roscosmos
Spaceflight Participant	Aleksey Dudin, Channel 1
Spaceflight Participant	Alena Mordovina, Channel 1

== Launch and docking ==
Soyuz MS-19 was launched on 5 October 2021, 08:55:02 and docked at 12:22:31 UTC following a three-hour, 2-orbit rendezvous profile, and after using a manual docking system operated by spacecraft commander Anton Shkaplerov, to the Rassvet module of the ISS.

== Background and film project ==
On 14 May 2021, the Interagency Committee approved the composition of the ISS main and alternate crews for the period 2021–2023. The crew of Soyuz MS-19 was decided then. Cosmonaut Anton Shkaplerov (commander) and the crew of the film The Challenge: actress Yulia Peresild and director Klim Shipenko, were chosen to go and went to the ISS on the Soyuz MS-19. The film drama was a joint project of Roscosmos, Channel One and the Yellow, Black and White studio. The back-up crew chosen after passing the medical committee was: New Drama Theater actress Alena Mordovina, director Alexei Dudin and the commander Oleg Artemyev. Since 24 May 2021, the crew members had been training at the Yuri Gagarin Cosmonaut Training Center. On 23 July 2021, the prime crew participated in a four-hour simulation inside a Soyuz replica while wearing the Sokol suit, and on 28 July 2021, the back-up crew completed the same exercise. According to the back-up commander Oleg Artemyev the performance of the two back-up Spaceflight Participants was outstanding. On 30 July 2021, the spacecraft had its pre-launch preparation started. On 31 August 2021, the medical committee announced that both the main and reserve crews were healthy for space flight.

The filming equipment was launched at Progress MS-17 and returned on Soyuz MS-18.

=== Reactions ===
The film, which according to Dmitry Rogozin, head of Roscosmos, is an "experiment to see if Roscosmos can prepare two ordinary people to fly in about 3 or 4 months" has received opposition from the scientific and aerospace communities, as to the fact that they remove trained cosmonauts from their flights, a misuse of public money, or even that using the station's resources for non-scientific purposes would be illegal. Igor Krasnov, Procurator General of Russia, has opened an investigation into whether the use of space station resources is illegal. Sergei Krikalev, director of crewed programs at Roscosmos, reportedly lost his position by speaking out against the project, but was reinstated after a few days following protests from cosmonauts on and off active duty.

== Movie ==
Klim Shipenko shot about 35–40 minutes of film on the ISS, as well as taking on the positions of director, operator, art director, and makeup artist. The Challenge was released on 12 April 2023. Oleg Novitsky and Pyotr Dubrov appear in the film, with Dubrov and Mark Vande Hei assisting in the production. Shkaplerov also appears in some scenes of the movie.

== Expansion of Russian Orbital Segment ==
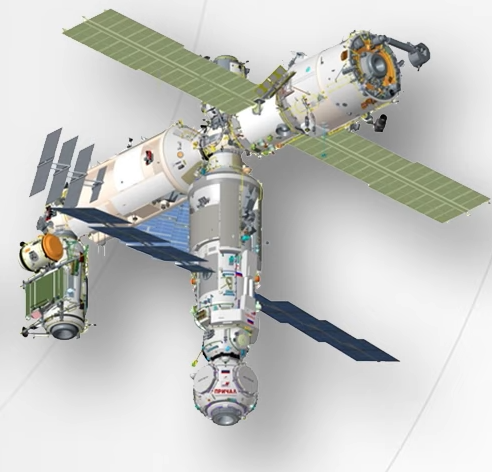
ISS Russian Orbital Segment after docking of UM Prichal module

The ISS flight manifest drafted by Roscosmos in the fall of 2020 set the launch of the Prichal module for on 24 November 2021, with docking at Nauka's nadir port two days later. The Prichal module will become the second addition to the Russian Orbital Segment (ROS) in 2021. One port on Prichal is equipped with an active hybrid docking port, which enables docking with the Nauka module. The remaining five ports are passive hybrids, enabling docking of Soyuz and Progress vehicles, as well as heavier modules and future spacecraft with modified docking systems. This will enable the Russian Orbital Segment to operate on its own after 2024.

To complete the integration of the UM Prichal into the Russian segment, cosmonauts Anton Shkaplerov and Petr Dubrov performed a spacewalk to lay cables between Nauka and Prichal. This spacewalk occurred on 19 January 2022. Seven additional spacewalks will follow through 2022 to complete the integration of the Nauka and Prichal modules into the Russian Orbital Segment.

== Return ==
The director and actress returned to Earth on 17 October 2021 on Soyuz MS-18 with commander Oleg Novitsky. Soyuz MS-19 landed on 30 March 2022.

After the successful landing of Soyuz MS-18, Dmitry Rogozin revealed that Konstantin Ernst (Director General or CEO of Channel One) paid for Shipenko and Pereslid's seats.

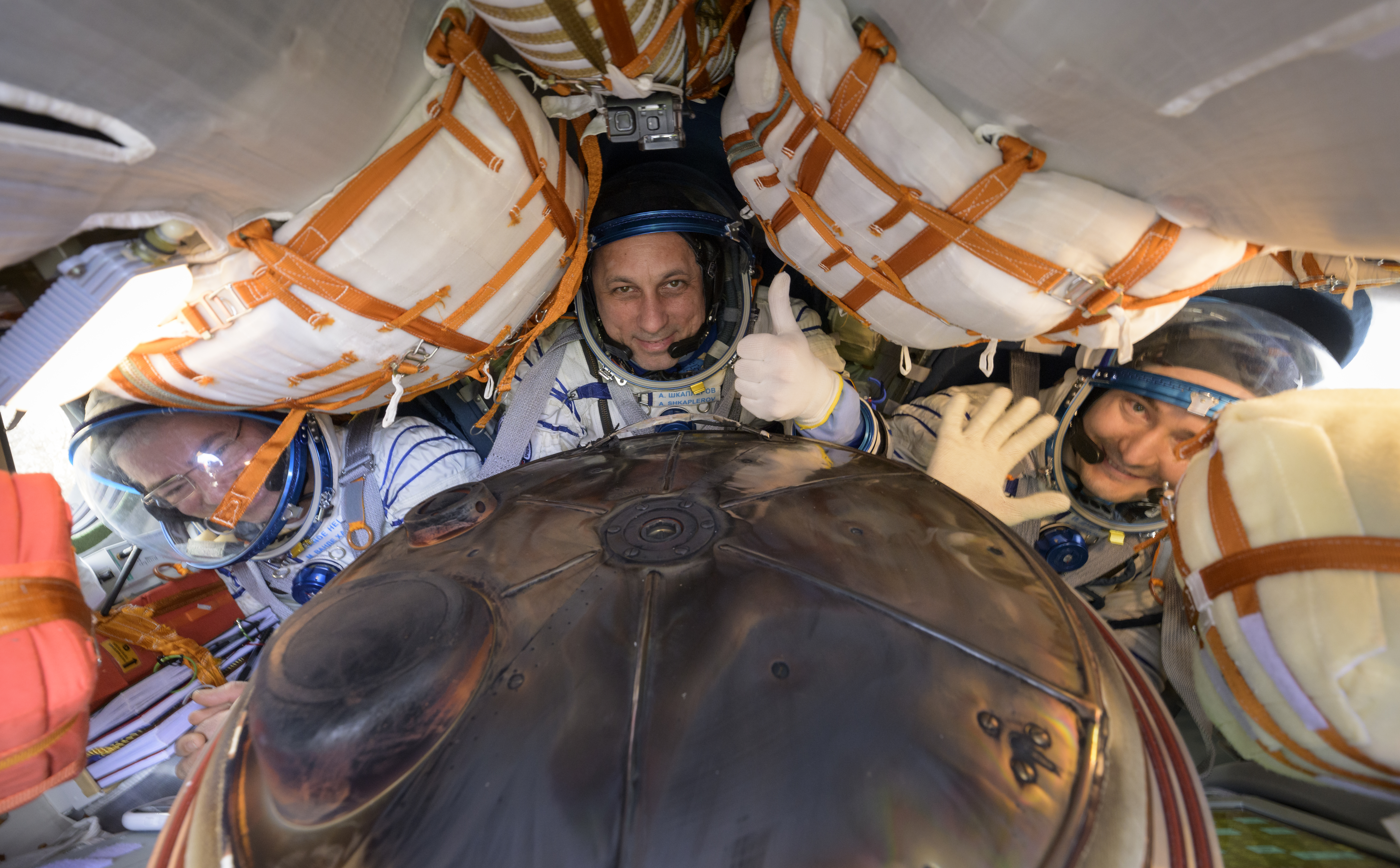
Soyuz MS-19 Landing

Pyotr Dubrov and Mark Vande Hei finally landed on 30 March 2022 on Soyuz MS-19 with commander Anton Skhaplerov.
