= Soyuz TMA-22 =

2011 Russian crewed spaceflight to the ISS

- Operator: Roscosmos
- COSPAR ID: 2011-067A
- SATCAT no.: 37877
- Mission duration: 165d, 07h, 31m

Spacecraft properties
- Spacecraft type: Soyuz-TMA 11F732
- Manufacturer: Energia

Crew
- Crew size: 3
- Members: Anton Shkaplerov; Anatoli Ivanishin; Daniel C. Burbank
- Callsign: Astraeus

Start of mission
- Launch date: 14 November 2011, 04:14:03 UTC
- Rocket: Soyuz-FG
- Launch site: Baikonur 1/5

End of mission
- Landing date: 27 April 2012, 11:45 UTC

Orbital parameters
- Reference system: Geocentric
- Regime: Low Earth

Docking with ISS
- Docking port: Poisk zenith
- Docking date: 16 November 2011; 05:24 UTC
- Undocking date: 27 April 2012; 08:15 UTC
- Time docked: 163d 2h 51m
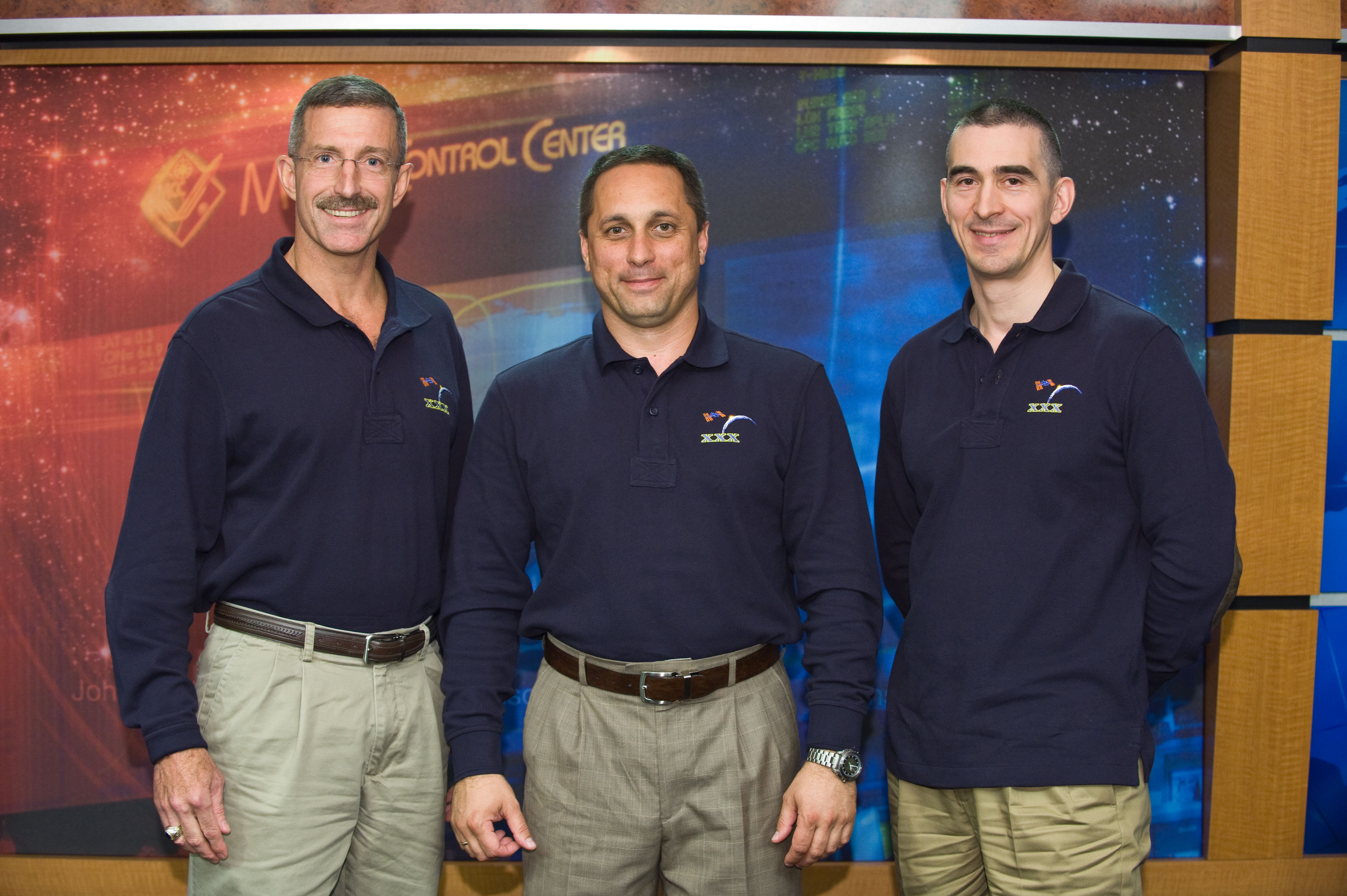
- From left to right: Daniel C. Burbank, Anton Shkaplerov and Anatoli Ivanishin Soyuz programme (Crewed missions)

Soyuz TMA-22 was a crewed spaceflight to the International Space Station (ISS). TMA-22 was the 111th flight of a Soyuz spacecraft, and transported three members of the Expedition 29 crew to the ISS. The spacecraft docked to the ISS on 16 November 2011, and remained docked to serve as an emergency escape vehicle until its undocking on 27 April 2012. Soyuz TMA-22 successfully landed in Kazakhstan on 27 April 2012 11:45 GMT.

TMA-22 was the final flight of a Soyuz-TMA vehicle, following the design's replacement by the modernized TMA-M series. The launch of Soyuz TMA-22 was originally scheduled for 30 September 2011, but was delayed until 14 November following the launch failure of the Progress M-12M resupply vehicle on 24 August 2011. Soyuz TMA-22 was the first crewed mission to dock with the ISS since the Retirement of the American Space Shuttle fleet at the end of the STS-135 mission in July 2011.

== Crew ==
Position	Crew Member
Commander	(Russia) Anton Shkaplerov, Roscosmos; Expedition 29; First spaceflight
Flight Engineer 1	(Russia) Anatoli Ivanishin, Roscosmos; Expedition 29; First spaceflight
Flight Engineer 2	(United States) Daniel C. Burbank, NASA; Expedition 29; Third and last spaceflight

=== Backup crew ===
Position	Crew Member
Commander	(Russia) Gennady Padalka, Roscosmos
Flight Engineer 1	(Russia) Sergei Revin, Roscosmos
Flight Engineer 2	(United States) Joseph M. Acaba, NASA

== Mission profile ==
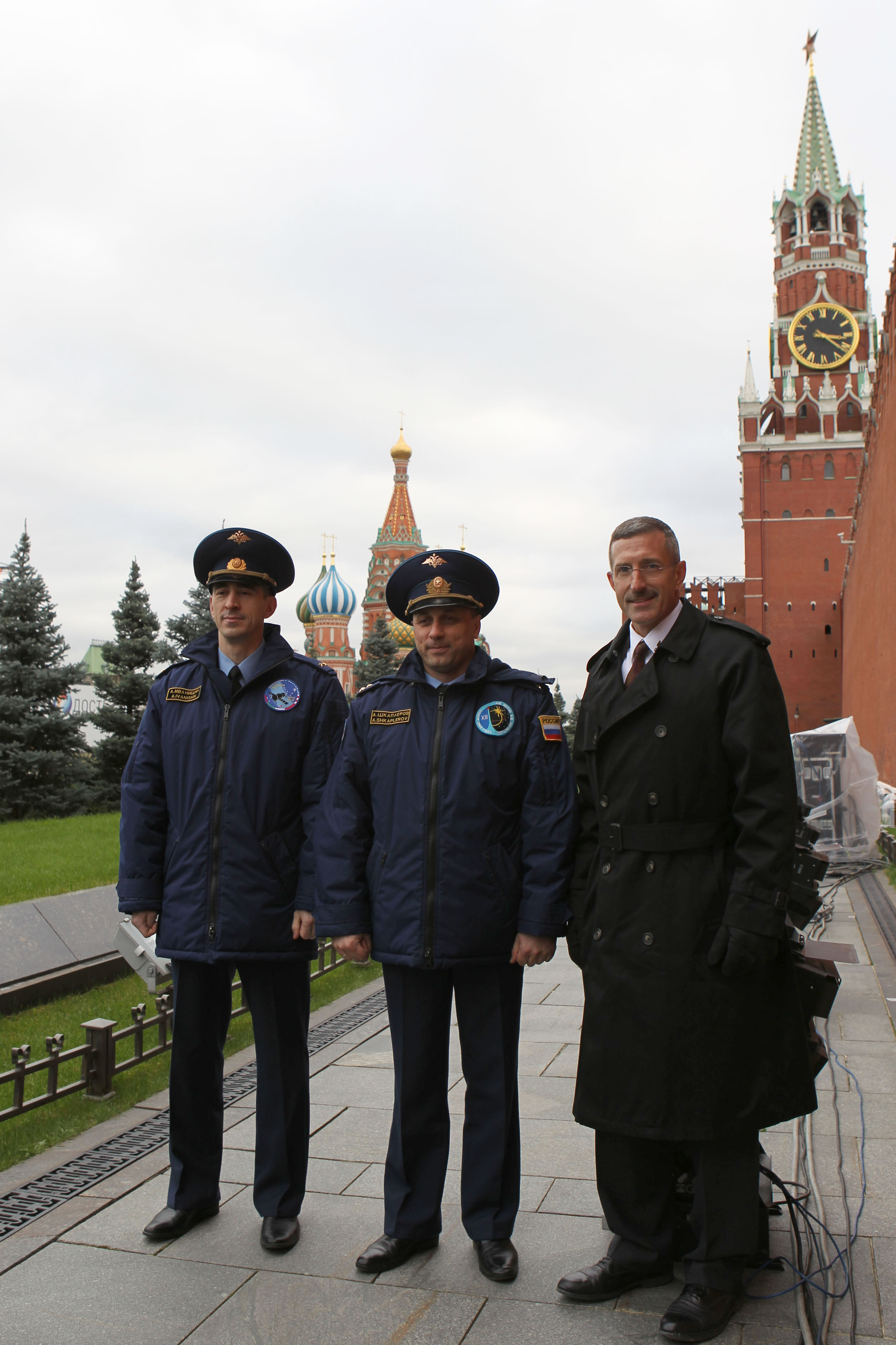
The Soyuz TMA-22 crew members conduct their ceremonial tour of Red Square on 24 October 2011.

=== Rescheduling of launch ===
Soyuz TMA-22's launch was rescheduled from late September 2011 to 14 November, due to the failed launch of the uncrewed Progress M-12M cargo spacecraft on 24 August 2011. The incident was caused by a blocked fuel line leading to the gas generator of the third-stage RD-0110 engine of the spacecraft's Soyuz-U booster. After the loss of Progress M-12M, all Russian crewed spaceflights were temporarily suspended, due to the similarities between the failed engine and the third-stage engine in use on the crewed Soyuz-FG booster. A Russian commission blamed the Progress M-12M failure on a single human error, and put additional procedures in place to prevent the problem from recurring. On 30 October 2011, Russia successfully launched the uncrewed Progress M-13M cargo spacecraft atop a Soyuz-U booster, clearing the way for the Soyuz TMA-22 launch.

=== Launch ===
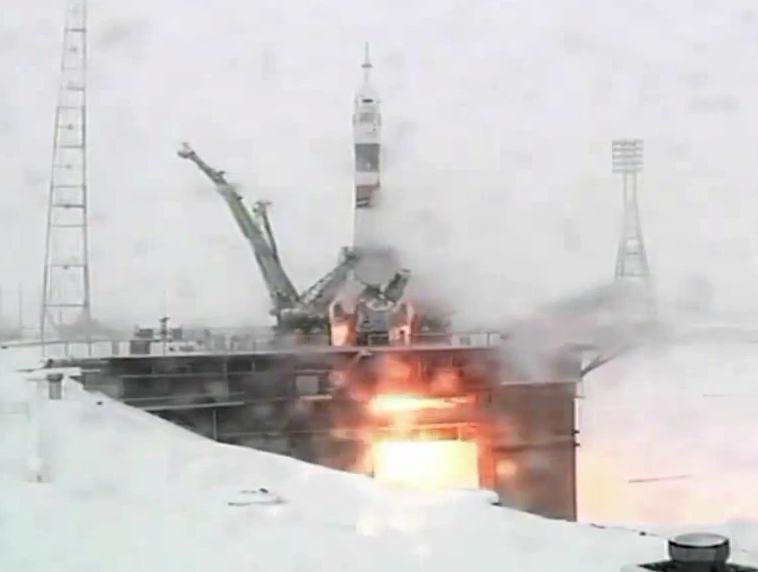
Soyuz TMA-22 lifts off from Baikonur Cosmodrome, Kazakhstan, on 14 November 2011.

Soyuz TMA-22 was launched on schedule from the Gagarin's Start launchpad at Baikonur Cosmodrome, Kazakhstan, at 04:14:03 UTC on 14 November 2011. Soyuz Commander Shkaplerov sat in the Soyuz's center seat, with flight engineer Ivanishin strapped in to his left and NASA astronaut Burbank sitting to his right. The Soyuz-FG rocket carrying Soyuz TMA-22 was launched in blizzard-like conditions, with high winds and temperatures as low as −5 °C (23 °F). Nonetheless, conditions were deemed to be within acceptable parameters for launch.

The rocket followed a nominal ascent trajectory, and successfully inserted Soyuz TMA-22 into orbit approximately nine minutes after the launch. Once in orbit, the spacecraft deployed its two solar panels and communications antennas as planned.

=== Docking ===
Soyuz TMA-22 docked with the ISS at 05:24 GMT on 16 November 2011, about nine minutes earlier than planned. The spacecraft docked at the MRM-2 Poisk module, while Soyuz TMA-22 and the ISS were flying 400 kilometres (250 mi) above the southern Pacific Ocean. The Soyuz crew entered the ISS at around 6:39 GMT, and were greeted by Expedition 29 crewmembers Mike Fossum, Sergei Volkov and Satoshi Furukawa. Burbank, Shkaplerov and Ivanishin received congratulatory satellite calls from Russian dignitaries and family members before participating in a safety briefing led by Expedition 29 commander Fossum.

=== Deorbit ===
Soyuz TMA-22 undocked from the ISS on 27 April 2012 at 8:15 AM (GMT), carrying Burbank, Shkaplerov and Ivanishin, and landed safely near Arkalyk, Kazakhstan, at 11:45 AM the same day. The spacecraft's departure ended Expedition 30, and left astronauts Oleg Kononenko, André Kuipers and Don Pettit aboard the station to begin Expedition 31.

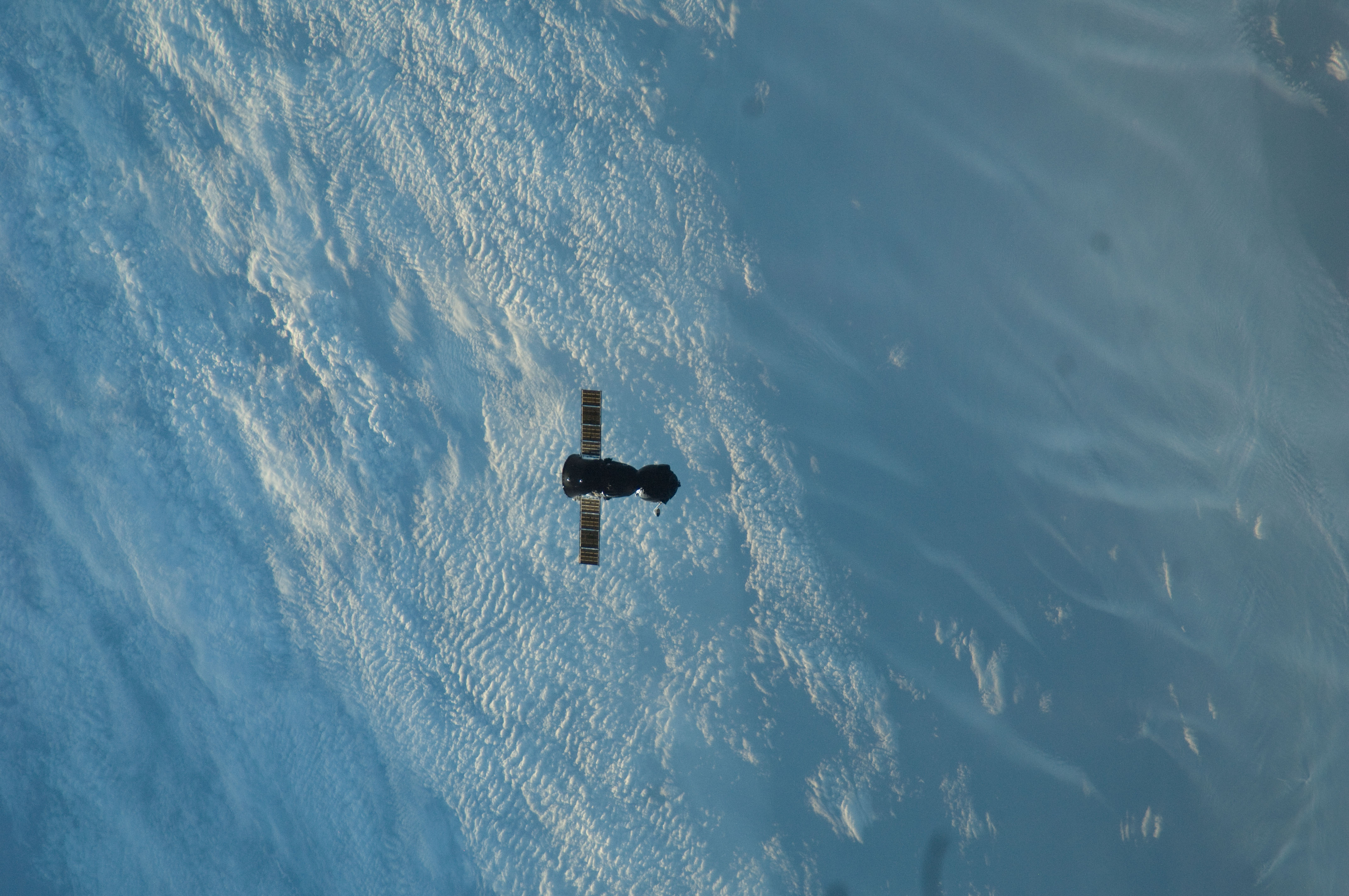
Soyuz TMA-22 following its departure from the ISS.

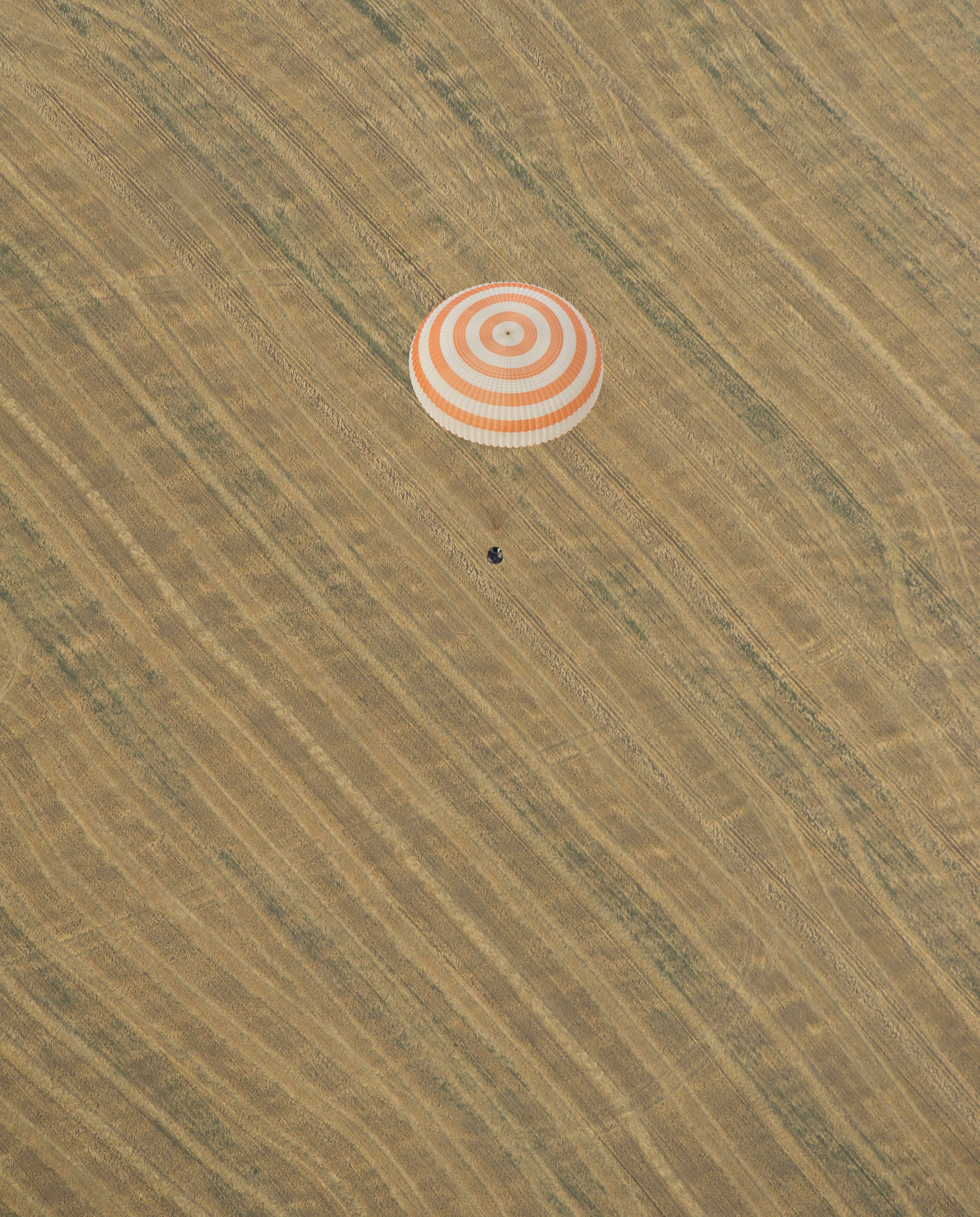
The Soyuz TMA-22 capsule shortly before landing.

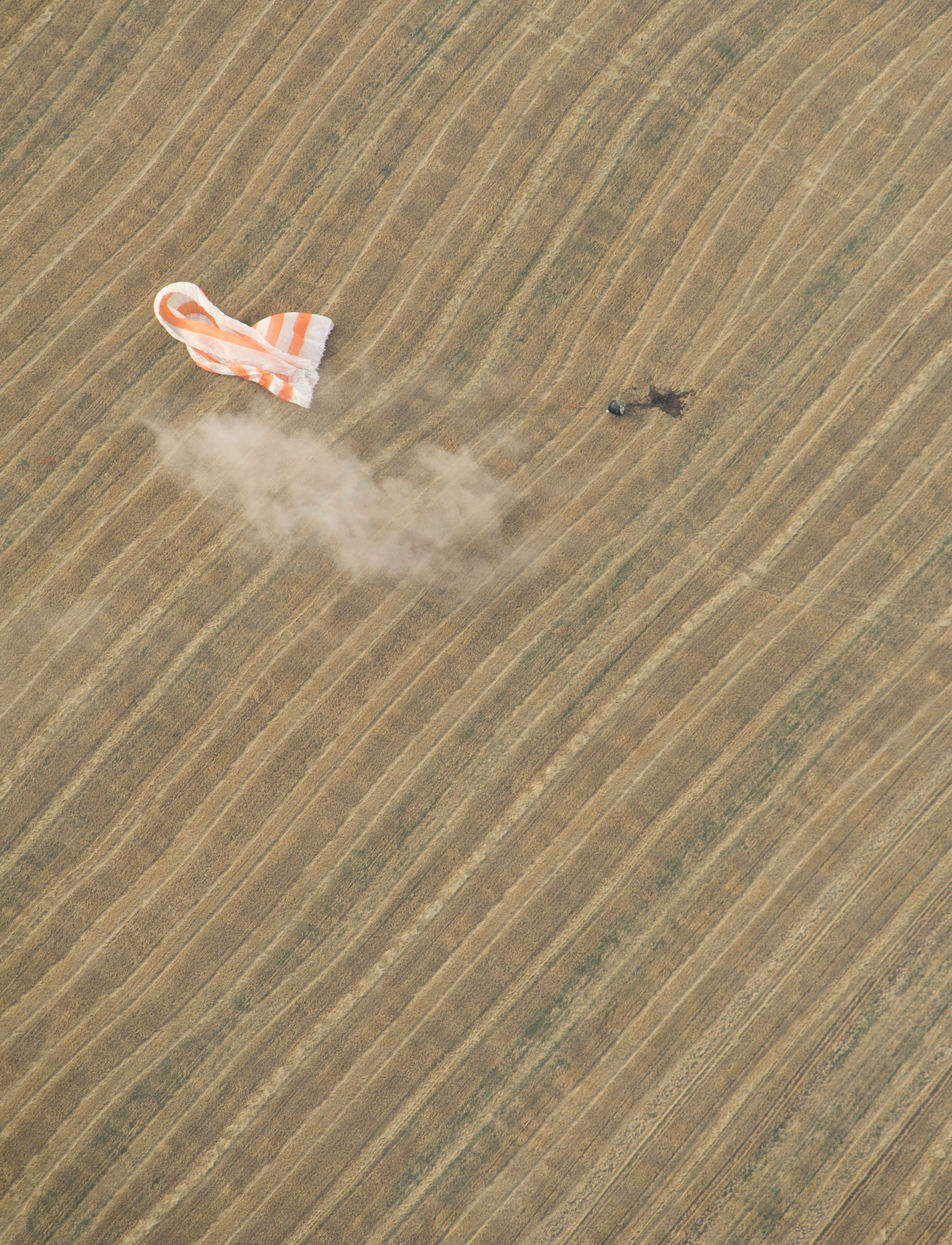
The capsule shortly after landing.

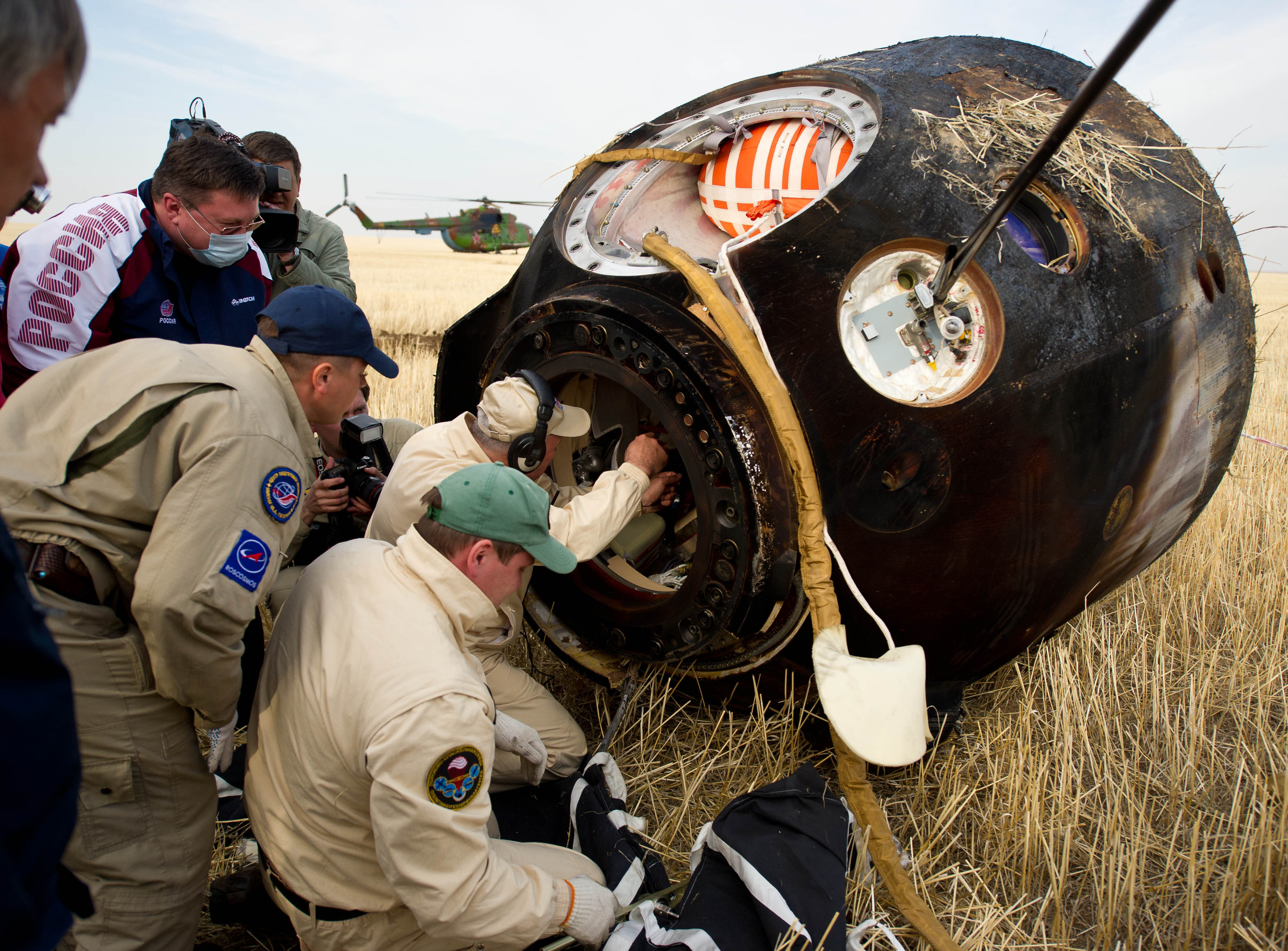
Russian support personnel assist crew members in leaving the capsule.

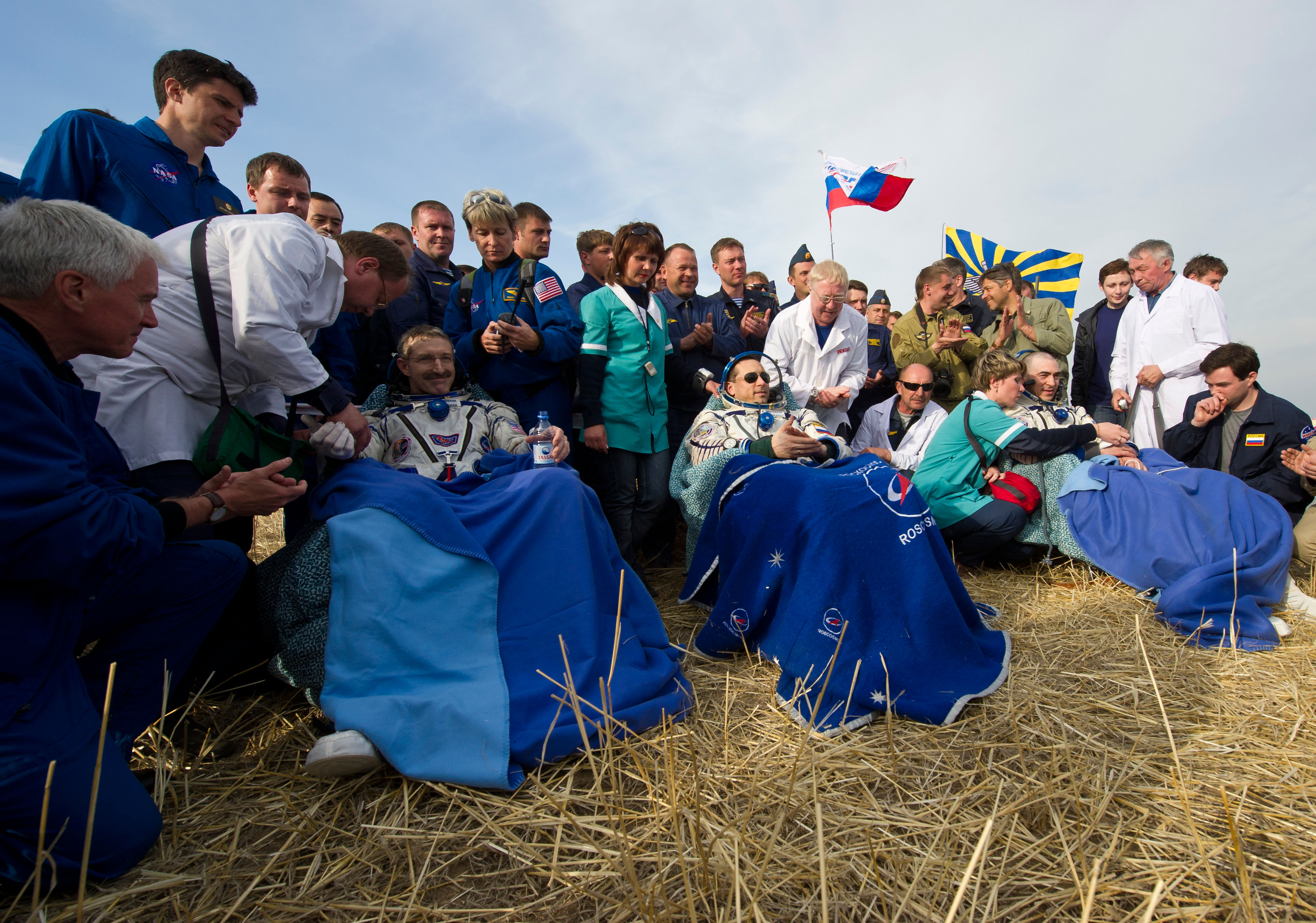
The crew members seated in chairs outside the capsule after landing.
