= Max Q (astronaut band) =

Houston, TX based musical group

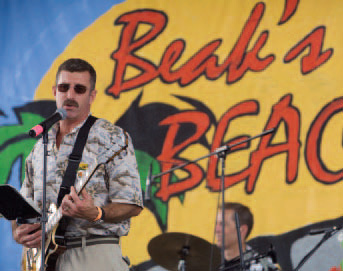
- Guitarist Dan Burbank and former drummer Jim Wetherbee on stage in 2004.

Background information
- Origin: Houston, Texas, U.S.
- Genres: Rock
- Years active: 1987–present
- Members: Ricky Arnold; Dan Burbank; TC Dyson; Taco Cockrell; Chris Ferguson; Drew Feustel; Kevin A. Ford; Chris A. Hadfield; Box Johnson; Dottie Metcalf-Lindenburger; Stevie Ray Robinson
- Past members: Jim Wetherbee; Pinky Nelson; Hoot Gibson; Brewster Shaw; Steven A. Hawley; Carl Walz; Susan Helms; Chili Chilton; Pierre Thuot

Max Q is a Houston-based informal rock band whose members are all astronauts. It was formed in early 1987 by Brewster Shaw and Robert L. Gibson, recruiting George Nelson. Gibson has stated that he came up with the name "Max Q" (though recognizes that Shaw has also claimed having come up with the name himself) as a reference to the engineering term for the maximum dynamic pressure from the atmosphere experienced by an ascending spacecraft. He joked in a 2018 interview that, like a Space Shuttle, the band "makes lots of noise but no music".

Max Q does not sell albums or have a manager, instead performing on a case-by-case scheduled basis. Band members share the arrangement of transport, venue and payment. The band utilises a rotating line-up due to flight crew assignments, training, and the occasional retirement. In 2009, active members included:

- Ricky Arnold – rhythm guitar
- Dan Burbank – lead vocals and guitar
- Tracy "TC" Caldwell Dyson – lead vocals
- Ken "Taco" Cockrell – keyboards and background vocals
- Chris Ferguson – drums
- Drew Feustel – lead vocals and lead guitar
- Kevin A. Ford – drums
- Chris A. Hadfield – lead vocals and bass guitar
- Greg "Box" Johnson – keyboards and background vocals
- Dottie Metcalf-Lindenburger – lead vocals
- Steve "Stevie Ray" Robinson – lead guitar

Former members include:

- Carl Walz – lead vocals
- Susan Helms – lead vocals and keyboards (after Hawley left)
- Kevin "Chili" Chilton – lead vocals and guitar (after Shaw left)
- Pierre Thuot – bass guitar (after Nelson left)
- Steven A. Hawley - keyboards (the original keyboard player)

With the original members having been:

- Jim Wetherbee – drums
- George "Pinky" Nelson – bass guitar
- Robert "Hoot" Gibson – lead vocals and lead guitar
- Brewster Shaw – rhythm guitar

== History ==
The beginning of the band is connected to the Challenger disaster. In January 1987, Dan Brandenstein, Chief of the Astronaut Office, suggested that they hold a party to improve morale. Brewster Shaw then approached Robert Gibson, whom he had previously performed with at NASA, with the idea of forming a four-piece group to play at the venue. George Nelson and Jim Wetherbee were both invited to rehearsals and joined soon after. The band was well-received, leading to the addition of Steven A. Hawley on the keyboard for the 'Fajita Fest' in February, an annual event thrown by NASA Mission Operations Directorate. The band has played at weddings, hotels and general festivities such as Christmas Eve and New Year’s Eve. They also performed live on Good Morning America in December 1995. In 1994, Gibson's last year with the group and the 25th anniversary of the Apollo 11, Max Q was the warm-up band for Cheap Trick on their tour through Houston.

On May 1st 2009, the original Max Q band members reunited for the first time in twenty-one years to perform at the induction gala of members Wetherbee and Nelson into the U.S Astronaut Hall of Fame.
