= Anton Shkaplerov =

Russian cosmonaut (born 1972)

- Антон Шкаплеров
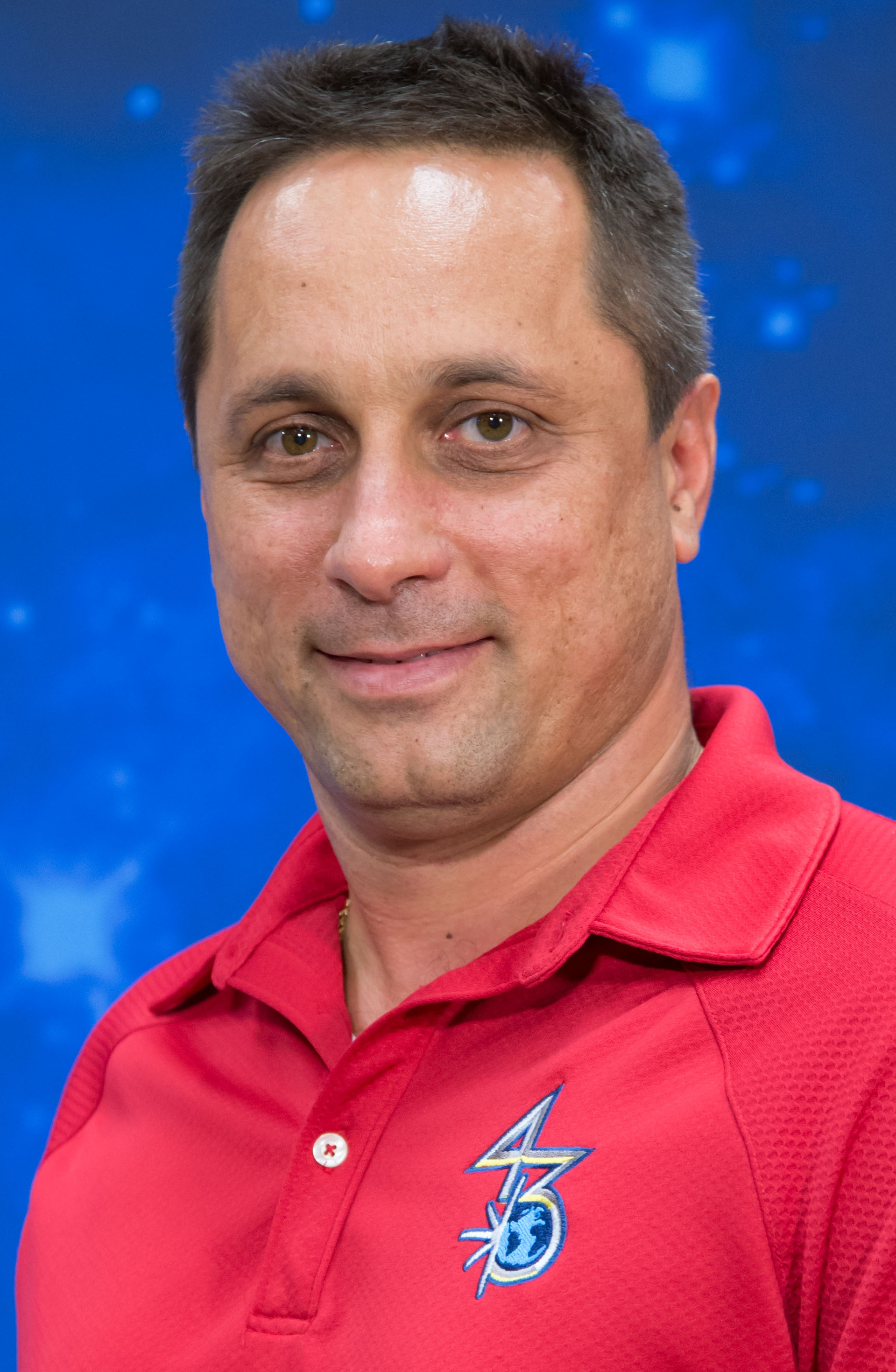
- Shkaplerov at the Expedition 42/43 crew news conference in 2014
- Born: Anton Nikolaevich Shkaplerov; 20 February 1972 (age 54); Sevastopol, Ukrainian SSR, Soviet Union
- Occupations: Colonel, Russian Air Force
- Space career

Roscosmos cosmonaut
- Status: Retired
- Time in space: 709 days, 8 hours, 4 minutes
- Selection: 2003 Intercosmos Group
- Total EVAs: 3
- Total EVA time: 21 hours, 39 minutes
- Missions: Soyuz TMA-22 (Expedition 29/30); Soyuz TMA-15M (Expedition 42/43); Soyuz MS-07 (Expedition 54/55); Soyuz MS-19 (Expedition 65/66)
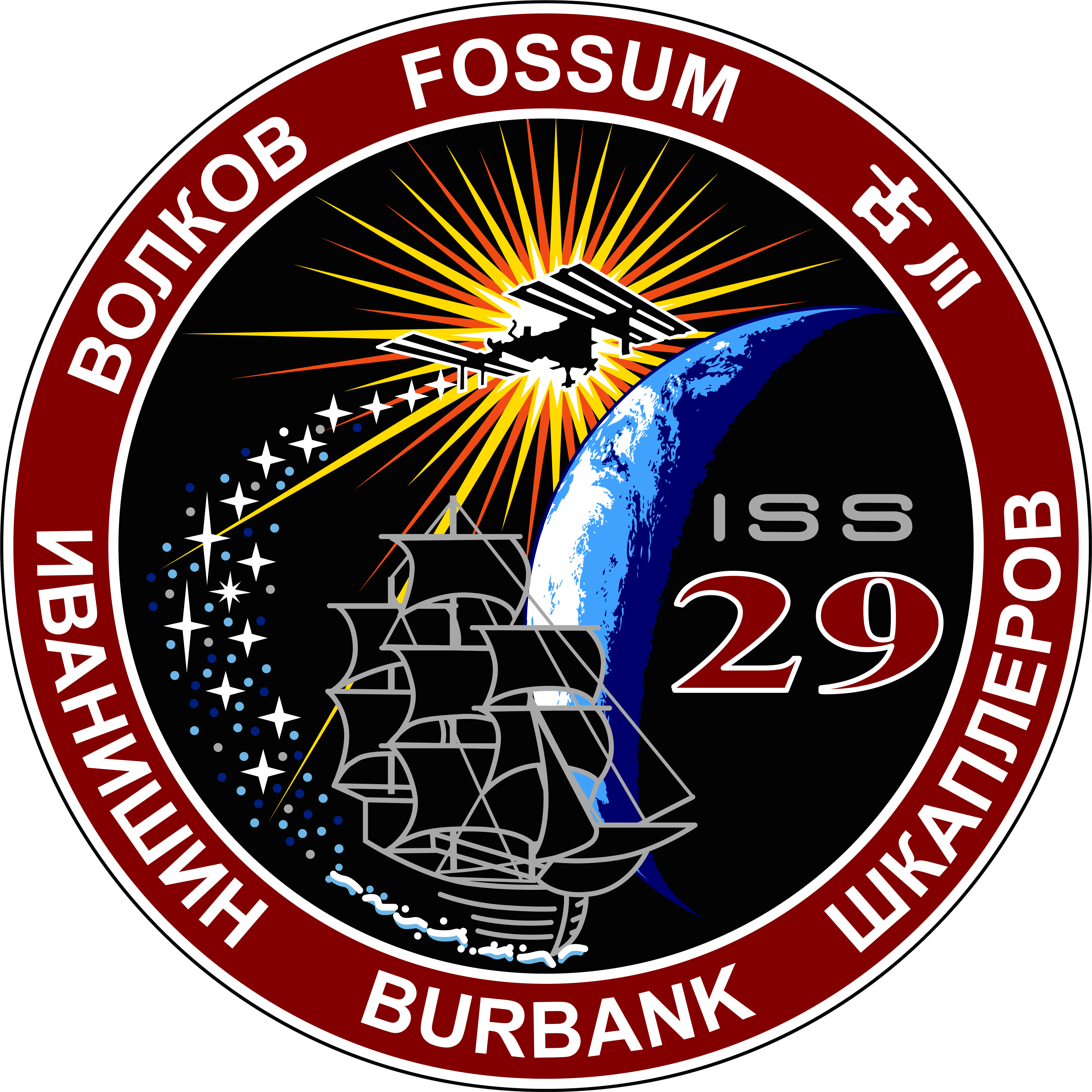
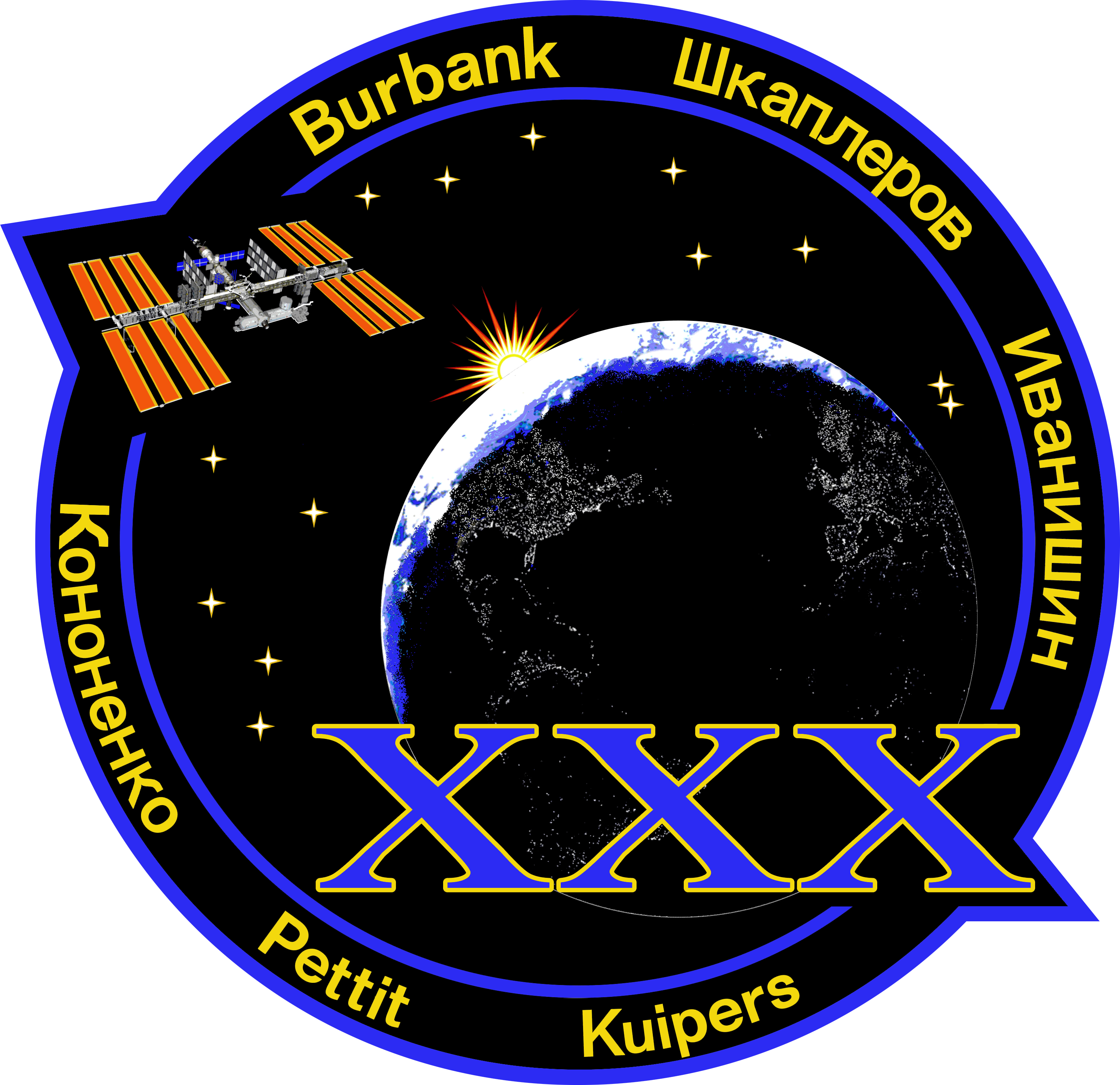
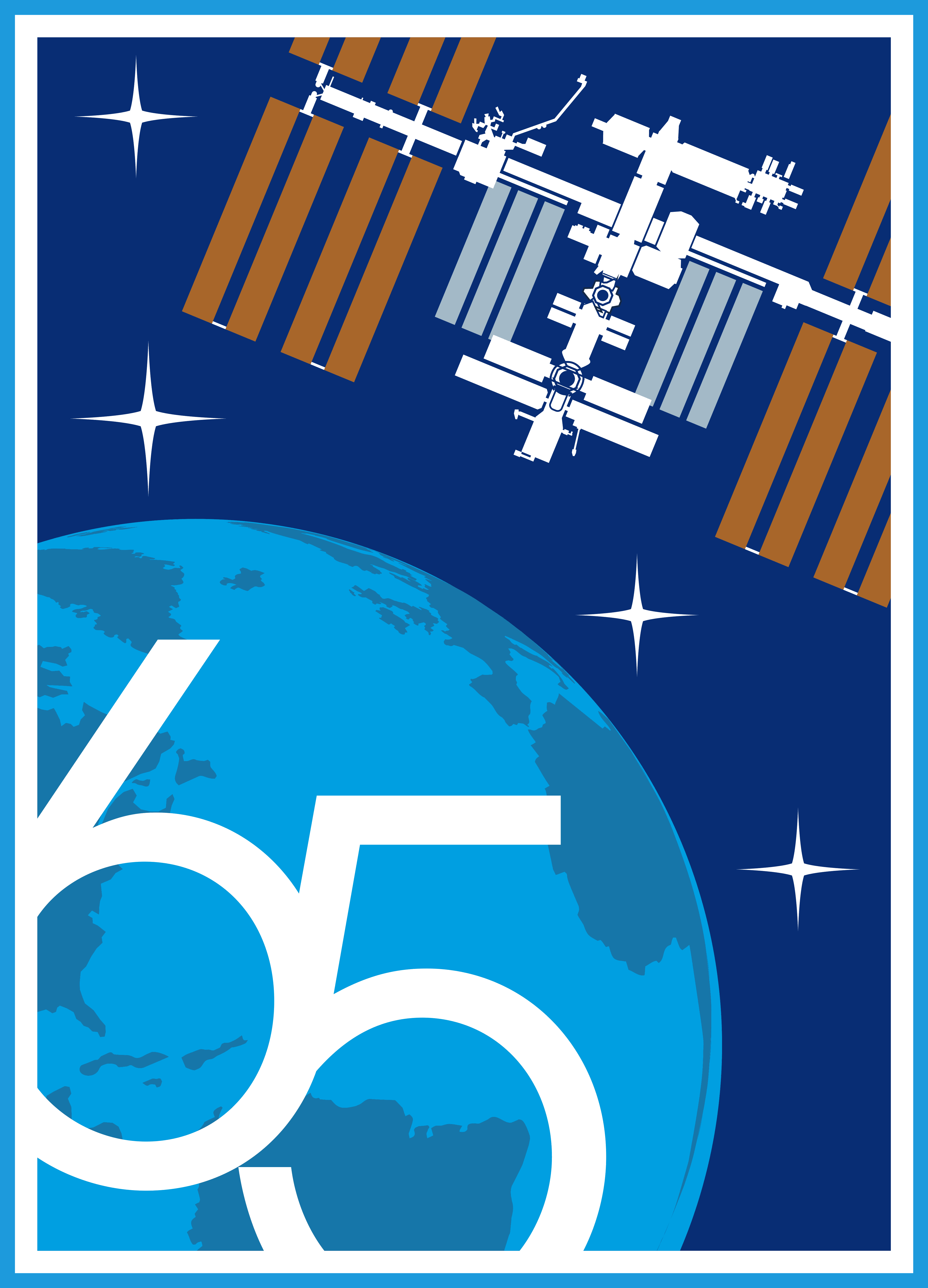
- Mission insignia
- Retired: February 1, 2023

Anton Nikolaevich Shkaplerov (Russian: Антон Николаевич Шкаплеров; born 20 February 1972) is a former Russian cosmonaut. He is a veteran of four spaceflights.

== Early life ==
Shkaplerov was born 20 February 1972, in Sevastopol, Crimea. He is married to Tatyana Petrovna, and they have two daughters. His parents are Nikolay Ivanovich Shkaplerov and Tamara Viktorovna Shkaplerova. In 1989, Shkaplerov learned to fly in a Yakovlev Yak-52, and after graduating from Sevastopol High School the same year, he entered the Kachinsk Air Force Pilot School. He graduated in 1994 as a pilot-engineer, and then graduated from N. E. Zukovskiy Air Force Engineering School in 1997. His hobbies include sports, travel, fishing, and golf.

== Cosmonaut career ==
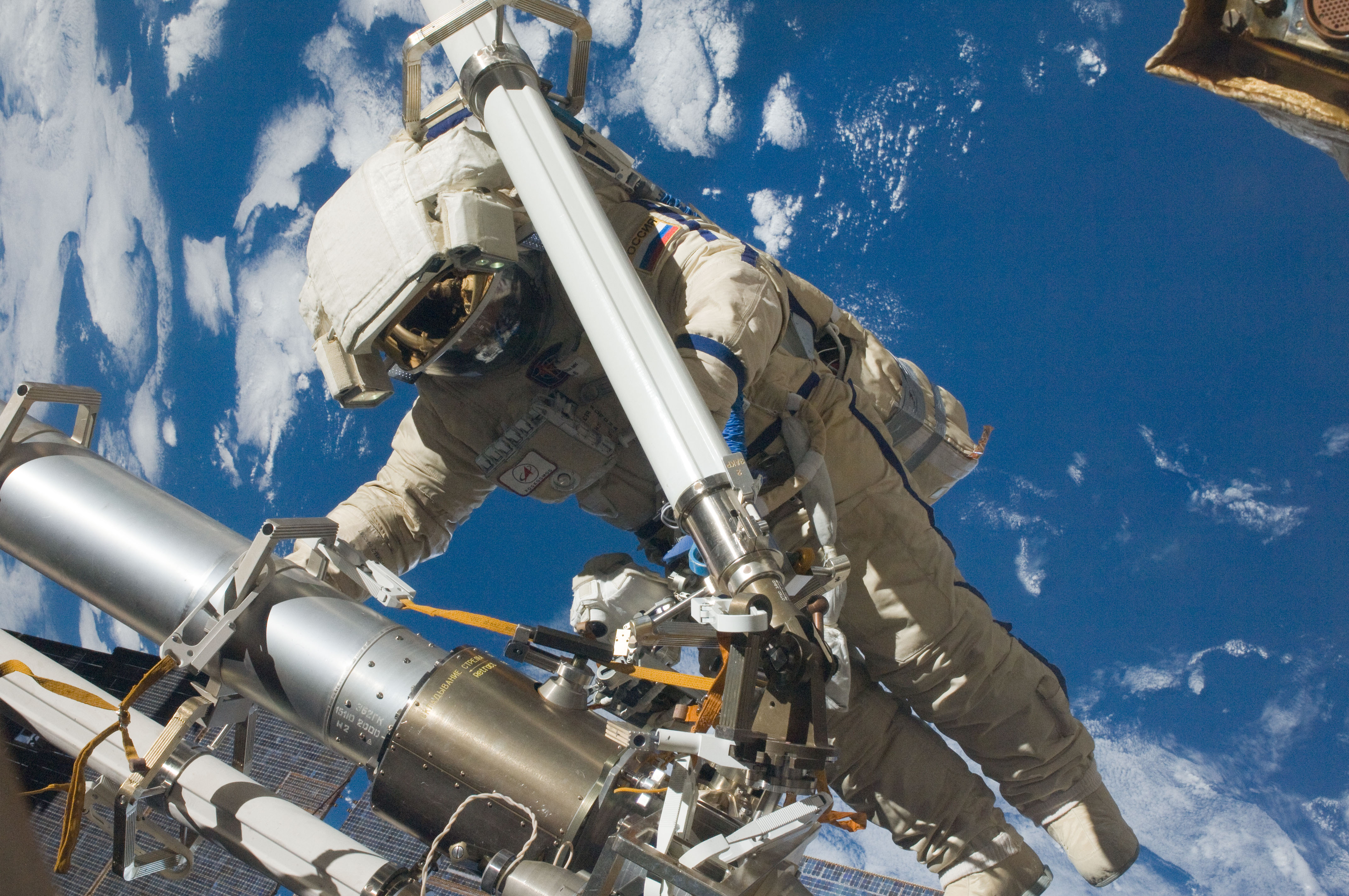
Shkaplerov participates in a session of EVA in February 2012.

After graduating in 1997, Shkaplerov served as a senior pilot-instructor in the Russian Air Force, flying Yak-52, L-29 and MiG-29 aircraft. He is a Class 2 Air Force pilot-instructor and an Instructor of General Parachute Training, having performed more than 300 parachute jumps. In May 2003, he was selected as a test-cosmonaut candidate at the Yuri Gagarin Cosmonaut Training Center, where he attended basic space training and was qualified as a test cosmonaut in June 2005. In 2007, Shkaplerov served as Director of Operations, Russian Space Agency, stationed at the Johnson Space Center in Houston, Texas, and was assigned as the back-up commander for Expedition 22.

=== Expedition 29/30 ===
Shkaplerov served as a Flight Engineer for Expedition 29/30 aboard the ISS. He was the commander of Soyuz TMA-22 and launched with flight engineers Anatoli Ivanishin and Dan Burbank on 16 November 2011. After 2 days in orbit, they docked with the International Space Station (ISS) to begin Expedition 29/30. On 12 February 2012, Shkaplerov and fellow cosmonaut Oleg Kononenko conducted a six-hour spacewalk outside the ISS. They installed shields on the Zvezda Service Module to protect it from micrometeoroid orbital debris and move the Strela 1 crane from the Pirs docking compartment to the Poisk Mini Research Module (MRM-2). The duration was 6 hours 15 minutes. They spent 165 days in space before undocking and returning to Earth on 27 April 2012.

=== Expedition 42/43 ===
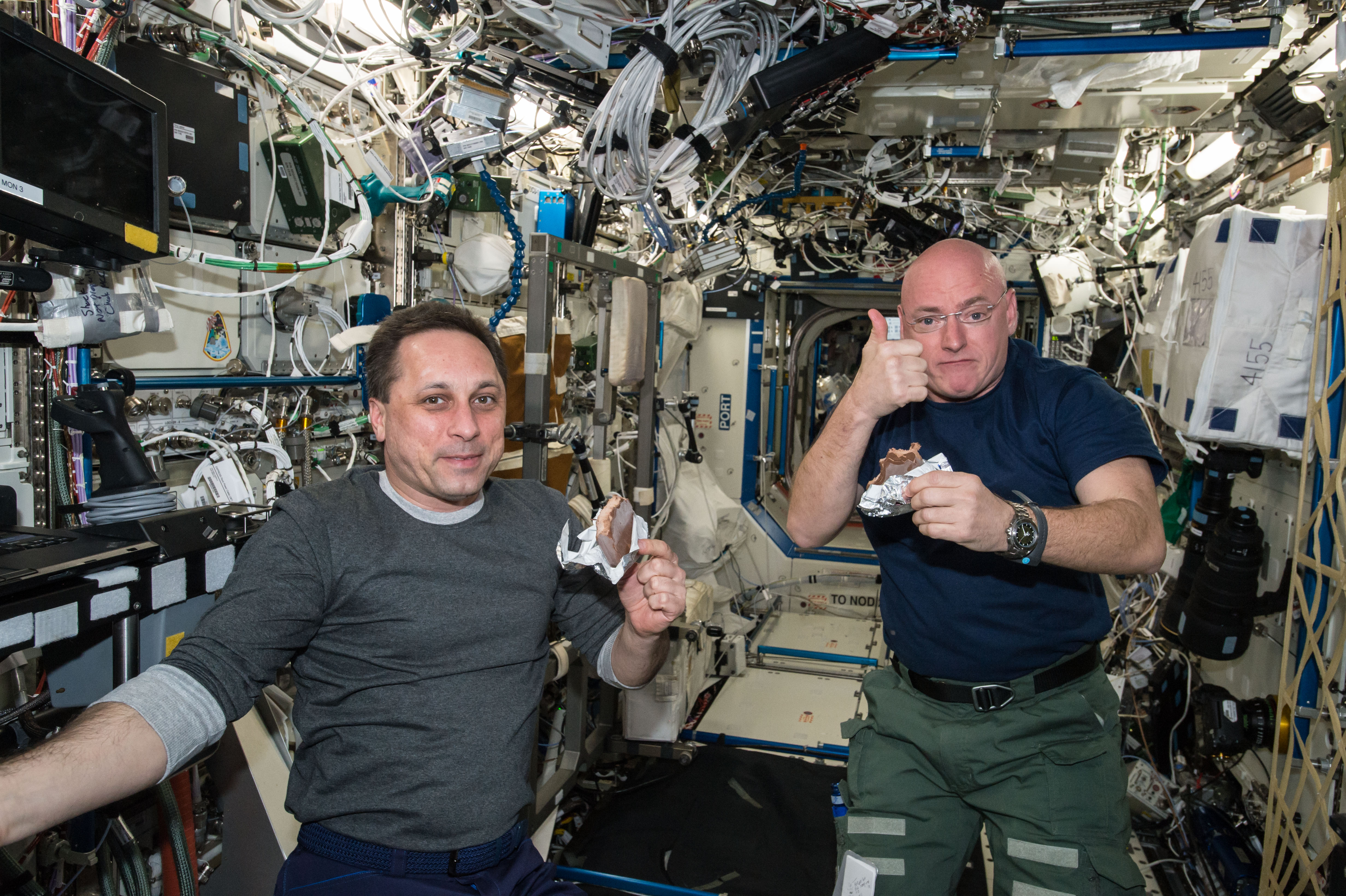
Shkaplerov (left) pictured alongside Scott Kelly in the Destiny laboratory

On 23 November 2014, Shkaplerov commanded Soyuz TMA-15M alongside flight engineers Samantha Cristoforetti and Terry Virts (along with three Lego minifigure replicas of them) from the Baikonur Cosmodrome. It successfully docked at the ISS roughly six hours later, and the crew joined the Expedition 42 crew which consisted of commander Barry Wilmore and Flight Engineers Aleksandr Samokutyayev and Yelena Serova. The crew spent 199 days in space before returning to Earth on 11 June 2015. Shkaplerov's total time in space was brought to 365 days.

=== Expedition 54/55 ===
Shkaplerov was launched on into space on board Soyuz MS-07 on 17 December 2017, with NASA astronaut Scott Tingle and Norishige Kanai of JAXA. He was the flight engineer of Expedition 54 and commander of Expedition 55.

On 2 February 2018, Shkaplerov and Expedition 54 commander Alexander Misurkin participated in an 8-hour 13 minutes spacewalk outside of the ISS to replace an old electronics box for a high-gain communications antenna. At completion, the two cosmonauts set a new record for the longest Russian spacewalk to date.

=== Expedition 65/66 ===
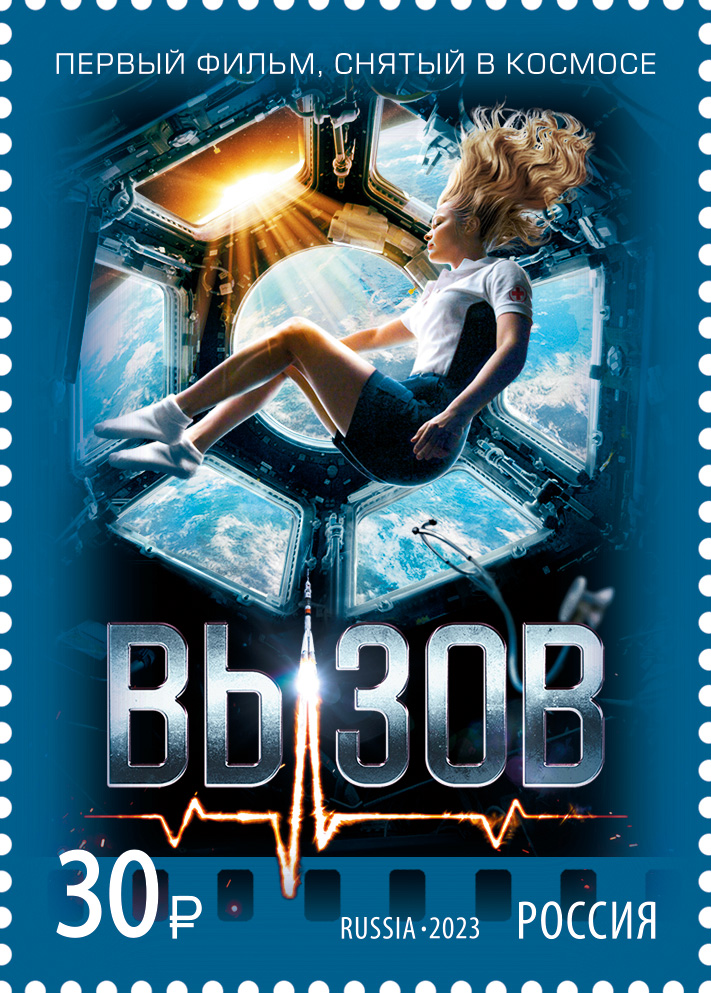
Russian stamp dedicated to the film The Challenge

Shkaplerov flew to the ISS on board Soyuz MS-19 on 5 October 2021 with film director Klim Shipenko and actress Yulia Peresild, who were filming The Challenge, a joint project of Roscosmos, Channel One and the Yellow, Black and White studio. Shkaplerov appeared in some scenes of the film. Shipenko and Peresild returned to Earth on Soyuz MS-18 with Oleg Novitsky, while Shkaplerov became ISS commander as part of Expedition 66.

On 19 January 2022, he participated in an 7-hour 11 minutes spacewalk to configure the Prichal module to support visiting Soyuz and Progress vehicles.

Shkaplerov landed on 30 March 2022 with Russian cosmonaut Pyotr Dubrov and American astronaut Mark Vande Hei.

=== Statistics ===
#	Spacecraft launch	Launch date	Mission	Spacecraft landing	Landing date	Duration	Spacewalk times	Spacewalk duration
1	Soyuz TMA-22	14 November 2011, 04:14 UTC	ISS-29 / ISS-30	Soyuz TMA-22	27 April 2012, 11:45 UTC	165 days 7 hours 31 minutes	1	6 hours 15 minutes
2	Soyuz TMA-15M	23 November 2014, 21:01 UTC	ISS-42 / ISS-43	Soyuz TMA-15M	11 June 2015, 13:44 UTC	199 days 16 hours 43 minutes	0	0
3	Soyuz MS-07	17 December 2017, 07:21 UTC	ISS-54 / ISS-55	Soyuz MS-07	3 June 2018, 12:39 UTC	168 days 5 hours 18 minutes	1	8 hours 13 minutes
4	Soyuz MS-19	5 October 2021, 08:55 UTC	ISS-65 / ISS-66	Soyuz MS-19	30 March 2022, 11:28:26 UTC	176 days 2 hours 33 minutes	1	7 hours 11 minutes
Source:						709 days 8 hours 4 minutes	3	21 hours 39 minutes

== See also ==
- A Beautiful Planet - 2016 IMAX documentary film showing scenes of Earth which features Shkaplerov and other ISS crew members
- List of Heroes of the Russian Federation

Preceded by Alexander Misurkin	ISS Commander (Expedition 55); 16 September to 18 November 2012	Succeeded by Andrew Feustel
Preceded by Thomas Pesquet	ISS Commander (Expedition 66); 29 March to 4 May 2022	Succeeded by Thomas Marshburn
