= List of Russian human spaceflight missions =

This is a list of the human spaceflight missions conducted by Roscosmos (previously and alternatively known as the Russian Space Agency, the Russian Aviation and Space Agency, and the Russian Federal Space Agency) since 1992. All Russian human spaceflight missions thus far have been carried out using the Soyuz vehicle, and all visited either Mir or the International Space Station.

The Roscosmos program is the successor to the Soviet space program. Numeration of the Soyuz flights therefore continues from previous Soviet Soyuz launches. For previous flights of the Soyuz and other crewed space vehicles, see List of Soviet human spaceflight missions.

== Soyuz-TM (1992–2002) ==
Order	Patch	Mission	launch	Duration	landing	Crew			Notes
66		Soyuz TM-13	2 October 1991	175 d 2 h 51 m 44 s	25 March 1992	A. Volkov	T. Aubakirov launch S. Krikalev landing	F. Viehböck launch K.-D. Flade landing	Visited Mir (13). This mission was launched during the Soviet era, but the country dissolved while the craft was in orbit. It returned cosmonauts from Soyuz TM-14.
67		Soyuz TM-14	17 March 1992	145 d 14 h 10 m 32 s	10 August 1992	A. Viktorenko	A. Kaleri	K.-D. Flade launch M. Tognini landing	Visited Mir (14). Returned cosmonaut from Soyuz TM-15.
68		Soyuz TM-15	27 July 1992	188 d 21 h 41 m 15 s	1 February 1993	A. Solovyev	S. Avdeyev	M. Tognini launch	Visited Mir (15).
69		Soyuz TM-16	24 January 1993	179 d 0 h 43 m 45 s	22 July 1993	G. Manakov	A. Poleshchuk	J.-P. Haigneré landing	Visited Mir (16). Returned cosmonaut from Soyuz TM-17.
70		Soyuz TM-17	1 July 1993	196 d 17 h 45 m 22 s	14 January 1994	V. Tsibliyev	A. Serebrov	J.-P. Haigneré launch	Visited Mir (17). Accidentally impacted the station.
71		Soyuz TM-18	8 January 1994	182 d 0 h 27 m 1 s	9 July 1994	V. Afanasyev	Yu. Usachov	V. Polyakov launch	Visited Mir (18).
72		Soyuz TM-19	1 July 1994	125 d 22 h 53 m 36 s	4 November 1994	Yu. Malenchenko	T. Musabayev	U. Merbold landing	Visited Mir (19). Returned cosmonaut from Soyuz TM-20.
73		Soyuz TM-20	3 October 1994	169 d 5 h 21 m 35 s	22 March 1995	A. Viktorenko	Ye. Kondakova	U. Merbold launch V. Polyakov landing	Visited Mir (20). Returned cosmonaut from Soyuz TM-18.
74		Soyuz TM-21	14 March 1995	181 d 0 h 41 m 6 s	11 September 1995	V. Dezhurov launch A. Solovyev landing	G. Strekalov launch N. Budarin landing	N. Thagard launch	Visited Mir (21). First launch of American astronaut. Crew was returned by STS-71; returned two cosmonauts from the same mission.
75		Soyuz TM-22	3 September 1995	179 d 1 h 41 m 45 s	29 February 1996	Yu. Gidzenko	S. Avdeyev	T. Reiter	Visited Mir (22).
76		Soyuz TM-23	21 February 1996	193 d 19 h 7 m 35 s	2 September 1996	Yu. Onufrienko	Yu. Usachov	C. André-Deshays landing	Visited Mir (23). Returned cosmonaut from Soyuz TM-24.
77		Soyuz TM-24	17 August 1996	196 d 17 h 26 m 13 s	2 March 1997	V. Korzun	A. Kaleri	C. André-Deshays launch R. Ewald landing	Visited Mir (24). Returned cosmonaut from Soyuz TM-25.
78		Soyuz TM-25	10 February 1997	184 d 22 h 7 m 40 s	14 August 1997	V. Tsibliyev	A. Lazutkin	R. Ewald launch	Visited Mir (25).
79		Soyuz TM-26	5 August 1997	197 d 17 h 34 m 36 s	19 February 1998	A. Solovyev	P. Vinogradov	L. Eyharts landing	Visited Mir (26). Returned cosmonaut from Soyuz TM-27.
80		Soyuz TM-27	29 January 1998	207 d 12 h 51 m 2 s	25 August 1998	T. Musabayev	N. Budarin	L. Eyharts launch Yu. Baturin landing	Visited Mir (27). Returned cosmonaut from Soyuz TM-28.
81		Soyuz TM-28	13 August 1998	198 d 16 h 31 m 19 s	28 February 1999	G. Padalka	S. Avdeyev launch	Yu. Baturin launch I. Bella landing	Visited Mir (28). Returned cosmonaut from Soyuz TM-29.
82		Soyuz TM-29	20 February 1999	188 d 20 h 16 m 19 s	28 August 1999	V. Afanasyev	J.-P. Haigneré	I. Bella launch S. Avdeyev landing	Visited Mir (29). Returned cosmonaut from Soyuz TM-28.
83		Soyuz TM-30	4 April 2000	72 d 19 h 42 m 16 s	16 June 2000	S. Zalyotin	A. Kaleri		Last visit to Mir (30).
84		Soyuz TM-31	31 October 2000	186 d 21 h 48 m 41 s	6 May 2001	Yu. Gidzenko launch T. Musabayev landing	S. Krikalev launch Yu. Baturin landing	W. Shepherd launch D. Tito^{1} landing	First Soyuz visit and first occupation of the ISS (1) by Expedition 1 (returned by STS-102). Returned crew from Soyuz TM-32.
85		Soyuz TM-32	28 April 2001	185 d 21 h 22 m 40 s	31 October 2001	T. Musabayev launch V. Afanasyev landing	Yu. Baturin launch C. Haigneré landing	D. Tito^{1} launch K. Kozeyev landing	Visited ISS (2). First "space tourist". Returned crew of Soyuz TM-33.
86		Soyuz TM-33	21 October 2001	195 d 18 h 52 m 18 s	5 May 2002	V. Afanasyev launch Yu. Gidzenko landing	C. Haigneré launch R. Vittori landing	K. Kozeyev launch M. Shuttleworth^{1} landing	Visited ISS (3). Returned crew of Soyuz TM-34.
87		Soyuz TM-34	25 April 2002	198 d 17 h 37 m 45 s	10 November 2002	Yu. Gidzenko launch S. Zalyotin landing	R. Vittori launch Yu. Lonchakov landing	M. Shuttleworth^{1} launch F. De Winne landing	Visited ISS (4). Returned crew of Soyuz TMA-1.

== Soyuz-TMA (2003–2012) ==
Order	Patch	Mission	launch	Duration	landing	Crew			Notes
88		Soyuz TMA-1	30 October 2002	185 d 22 h 53 m 14 s	4 May 2003	S. Zalyotin launch N. Budarin landing	Yu. Lonchakov launch D. Pettit landing	F. De Winne launch K. Bowersox landing	Visited ISS (5). First flight of TMA-class Soyuz. Returned Expedition 6 from ISS.
89		Soyuz TMA-2	26 April 2003	184 d 22 h 46 m 28 s	28 October 2003	Yu. Malenchenko	E. Lu	P. Duque landing	Visited ISS (6) with Expedition 7 crew. Returned cosmonaut from Soyuz TMA-3.
90		Soyuz TMA-3	18 October 2003	194 d 18 h 33 m 12 s	30 April 2004	A. Kaleri	M. Foale	P. Duque launch A. Kuipers landing	Visited ISS (7) with Expedition 8 crew. Returned cosmonaut from Soyuz TMA-4.
91		Soyuz TMA-4	19 April 2004	187 d 13 h 22 m 0 s	24 October 2004	G. Padalka	M. Fincke	A. Kuipers launch Yu. Shargin landing	Visited ISS (8) with Expedition 9 crew. Returned cosmonaut from Soyuz TMA-5.
92		Soyuz TMA-5	14 October 2004	192 d 19 h 2 m 0 s	24 April 2005	S. Sharipov	L. Chiao	Yu. Shargin launch R. Vittori landing	Visited ISS (9) with Expedition 10 crew. Returned cosmonaut from Soyuz TMA-6.
93		Soyuz TMA-6	15 April 2005	179 d 23 h 36 m 57 s	11 October 2005	S. Krikalev	J. Phillips	R. Vittori launch G. Olsen^{1} landing	Visited ISS (10) with Expedition 11 crew. Returned passenger from Soyuz TMA-7.
94		Soyuz TMA-7	1 October 2005	189 d 19 h 53 m 0 s	8 April 2006	V. Tokarev	W. McArthur	G. Olsen^{1} launch M. Pontes landing	Visited ISS (11) with part of Expedition 12 crew. Returned cosmonaut from Soyuz TMA-8.
95		Soyuz TMA-8	30 March 2006	182 d 22 h 43 m 0 s	29 September 2006	P. Vinogradov	J. Williams	M. Pontes launch A. Ansari^{1} landing	Visited ISS (12) with part of Expedition 13 crew. Returned passenger from Soyuz TMA-9.
96		Soyuz TMA-9	18 September 2006	215 d 8 h 22 m 0 s	21 April 2007	M. Tyurin	M. Lopez-Alegria	A. Ansari^{1} launch C. Simonyi^{1} landing	Visited ISS (13) with Expedition 14 crew. Returned passenger from Soyuz TMA-10.
97		Soyuz TMA-10	7 April 2007	196 d 17 h 5 m 0 s	21 October 2007	O. Kotov	F. Yurchikhin	C. Simonyi^{1} launch S. Shukor landing	Visited ISS (14) with Expedition 15 crew. Returned cosmonaut from Soyuz TMA-11.
98		Soyuz TMA-11	10 October 2007	191 d 19 h 7 m	19 April 2008	Yu. Malenchenko	P. Whitson	S. Shukor launch S. Yi landing	Visited ISS (15) with Expedition 16 crew. Returned cosmonaut from Soyuz TMA-12.
99		Soyuz TMA-12	8 April 2008	198 d 16 h 21 m	24 October 2008	S. Volkov	O. Kononenko	S. Yi launch R. Garriott^{1} landing	Visited ISS (16) with Expedition 17 crew. Returned passenger from Soyuz TMA-13.
100		Soyuz TMA-13	12 October 2008	178 d 0 h 15 m	8 April 2009	Yu. Lonchakov	M. Fincke	R. Garriott^{1} launch C. Simonyi^{1} landing	Visited ISS (17) with Expedition 18 crew. Returned passenger from Soyuz TMA-14.
101		Soyuz TMA-14	26 March 2009	199 d 16 h 43 m	11 October 2009	G. Padalka	M. Barratt	C. Simonyi^{1} launch G. Laliberté^{1} landing	Visited ISS (18) with Expedition 19 crew. Returned passenger from Soyuz TMA-16.
102		Soyuz TMA-15	27 May 2009	187 d 20 h 43 m	1 December 2009	R. Romanenko	F. De Winne	R. Thirsk	Visited ISS (19) with Expedition 20 crew.
103		Soyuz TMA-16	30 September 2009	169 d 4 h 8 m	18 March 2010	M. Surayev	J. Williams	G. Laliberté^{1} launch	Visited ISS (20) with Expedition 21 crew.
104		Soyuz TMA-17	20 December 2009	163 d 5 h 33 m	2 June 2010	O. Kotov	T. Creamer	S. Noguchi	Visited ISS (21) with Expedition 22 crew.
105		Soyuz TMA-18	2 April 2010	176 d 0 h 59 m	25 September 2010	A. Skvortsov	M. Korniyenko	T. Caldwell	Visited ISS (22) with Expedition 23 crew.
106		Soyuz TMA-19	15 June 2010	163 d 7 h 11 m	26 November 2010	F. Yurchikhin	S. Walker	D. Wheelock	Visited ISS (23) with Expedition 24 crew.

== Soyuz TMA-M (2010–2016) ==
Order	Mission	launch	Duration	landing	Crew			Notes
107	Soyuz TMA-01M	7 October 2010	159 d 8 h 43 m	16 March 2011	A. Kaleri	O. Skripochka	S. Kelly	Visited ISS (24) with Expedition 25 crew.
108	Soyuz TMA-20	15 December 2010	159 d 7 h 18 m	24 May 2011	D. Kondratyev	C. Coleman	P. Nespoli	Visited ISS (25) with Expedition 26 crew.
109	Soyuz TMA-21	4 April 2011	164 d 17 h 42 m	16 September 2011	A. Samokutyayev	A. Borisenko	R. Garan	Visited ISS (26) with Expedition 27 crew.
110	Soyuz TMA-02M	7 June 2011	166 d 06 h 13 m	22 November 2011	S. Volkov	M. Fossum	S. Furukawa	Visited ISS (27) with Expedition 28 crew.
111	Soyuz TMA-22	14 November 2011	165 d 07 h 31 m	27 April 2012	A. Shkaplerov	A. Ivanishin	D. Burbank	Visited ISS (28) with Expedition 29 crew.
112	Soyuz TMA-03M	21 December 2011	192 d 18 h 58 m	1 July 2012	O. Kononenko	A. Kuipers	D. Pettit	Visited ISS (29) with Expedition 30 crew.
113	Soyuz TMA-04M	15 May 2012	124 d 23 h 52 m	17 September 2012	G. Padalka	S. Revin	J. Acaba	Visited ISS (30) with Expedition 31 crew.
114	Soyuz TMA-05M	15 July 2012	126 d 11 h 16 m	19 November 2012	Yu. Malenchenko	S. Williams	A. Hoshide	Visited ISS (31) with Expedition 32 crew.
115	Soyuz TMA-06M	23 October 2012	143 d 16 h 20 m	16 March 2013	O. Novitski	Ye. Tarelkin	K. Ford	Visited ISS (32) with Expedition 33 crew.
116	Soyuz TMA-07M	19 December 2012	145 d 14 h 18 m	14 May 2013	R. Romanenko	T. Marshburn	C. Hadfield	Visited ISS (33) with Expedition 34 crew.
117	Soyuz TMA-08M	28 March 2013	166 d 6 h 14 m	11 September 2013	P. Vinogradov	A. Misurkin	C. Cassidy	Visited ISS (34) with Expedition 35 crew.
118	Soyuz TMA-09M	28 May 2013	166 d 6 h 18 m	11 November 2013	F. Yurchikhin	K. Nyberg	L. Parmitano	Visited ISS (35) with Expedition 36 crew.
119	Soyuz TMA-10M	25 September 2013	166 d 6 h 25 m	11 March 2014	O. Kotov	S. Ryazanski	M. Hopkins	Visited ISS (36) with Expedition 37 crew.
120	Soyuz TMA-11M	7 November 2013	187 d 21 h 44 m	14 May 2014	M. Tyurin	R. Mastracchio	K. Wakata	Visited ISS (37) with Expedition 38 crew.
121	Soyuz TMA-12M	25 March 2014	169 d 5 h 6 m	11 September 2014	A. Skvortsov	O. Artemyev	S. Swanson	Visited ISS (38) with Expedition 39 crew.
122	Soyuz TMA-13M	28 May 2014	165 d 8 h 1 m	10 November 2014	M. Surayev	R. Wiseman	A. Gerst	Visited ISS (39) with Expedition 40 crew.
123	Soyuz TMA-14M	25 September 2014	167 d 5 h 42 m	12 March 2015	A. Samokutyayev	Ye. Serova	B. Wilmore	Visited ISS (40) with Expedition 41 crew.
124	Soyuz TMA-15M	23 November 2014	199 d 16 h 43 m	11 June 2015	A. Shkaplerov	S. Cristoforetti	T. Virts	Visited ISS (41) with Expedition 42 crew.
125	Soyuz TMA-16M	27 March 2015	168 d 5 h 8 m	12 September 2015	Gennady Padalka	M. Korniyenko launch Andreas Mogensen landing	S. Kelly launch Aidyn Aimbetov landing	Visited ISS (42) with Expedition 43 crew.
126	Soyuz TMA-17M	22 July 2015	141 d 16 h 9 m	11 December 2015	Oleg Kononenko	Kimiya Yui	Kjell N. Lindgren	Visited ISS (43) with Expedition 44 crew.
127	Soyuz TMA-18M	2 September 2015	179 d 17 h 20 m	2 March 2016	Sergey Volkov	Andreas Mogensen launch Mikhail Korniyenko landing	Aidyn Aimbetov launch Scott Kelly landing	Visited ISS (44) with Expedition 45 crew.
128	Soyuz TMA-19M	15 December 2015	185 d 12 h 22 m	18 June 2016	Yuri Malenchenko	Timothy Kopra	Timothy Peake	Visited ISS (45) with Expedition 46 crew.
129	Soyuz TMA-20M	18 March 2016	172 d 3 h 47 m	7 September 2016	Aleksey Ovchinin	Oleg Skripochka	Jeffrey Williams	Visited ISS (46) with Expedition 47 crew.

== Soyuz MS (2016–present) ==
Order	Mission	launch	Duration	landing	Crew			Notes
130	Soyuz MS-01	7 July 2016	115 d 2 h 22 m	30 October 2016	Anatoli Ivanishin	Takuya Onishi	Kathleen Rubins	First flight of MS-class Soyuz. Visited ISS (47) with Expedition 48 crew.
131	Soyuz MS-02	19 October 2016	173 d 3 h 29 m	10 April 2017	Sergei Ryzhikov	Andrei Borisenko	Robert S. Kimbrough	Visited ISS (48) with Expedition 49 crew.
132	Soyuz MS-03	17 November 2016	196 d 17 h 49 m	2 June 2017	Oleg Novitskiy	Thomas Pesquet	launch Peggy A. Whitson; N/A landing	Visited ISS (49) with Expedition 50 crew.
133	Soyuz MS-04	20 April 2017	135d 18h 8m	3 September 2017	Fyodor Yurchikhin	Jack Fischer	N/A launch Peggy A. Whitson landing	Visited ISS (50) with Expedition 51 crew.
134	Soyuz MS-05	28 July 2017	139d 4h 57m 16s	14 December 2017	Sergey Ryazansky	Paolo Nespoli	Randy Bresnik	Visited ISS (51) with Expedition 52 crew.
135	Soyuz MS-06	12 September 2017	168d 5h 13m 58s	28 February 2018	Alexander Misurkin	Mark Vande Hei	Joseph Acaba	Visited ISS (52) with Expedition 53 crew.
136	Soyuz MS-07	17 December 2017	166d 0h 37m	3 June 2018	Anton Shkaplerov	Norishige Kanai	Scott D. Tingle	Visited ISS (53) with Expedition 54 crew.
137	Soyuz MS-08	21 March 2018	196d 18h 0m 22s	4 October 2018	Oleg Artemyev	Andrew J. Feustel	Richard R. Arnoldc	Visited ISS (54) with Expedition 55 crew.
138	Soyuz MS-09	6 June 2018	196d 17h 49m	20 December 2018	Sergey Prokopyev	Alexander Gerst	Serena M. Auñón-Chancellor	Visited ISS (55) with Expedition 56 crew.
139	Soyuz MS-10	11 October 2018	19m 41s	11 October 2018	Aleksey Ovchinin	Nick Hague		Was scheduled to visit ISS (56), with Expedition 57 crew. Aborted after launch due to booster failure; crew survived ballistic re-entry and were reassigned to Soyuz MS-12.
140	Soyuz MS-11	3 December 2018	203d 15h 15m 58s	25 June 2019	Oleg Kononenko	David Saint-Jacques	Anne McClain	Visited ISS (57) with Expedition 58 crew. launch brought forward from 20 December due to failure of MS-10.
141	Soyuz MS-12	14 March 2019	202d 6h 36m	3 October 2019	Aleksey Ovchinin	Nick Hague	Christina Koch launch Hazza Al Mansouri landing	Visited ISS (58) with Expedition 59 crew.
142	Soyuz MS-13	20 July 2019	200 days	6 February 2020	Aleksandr Skvortsov	Luca Parmitano	Andrew R. Morgan launch Christina Koch landing	Visiting ISS (59) with Expedition 60 crew.
143	Soyuz MS-15	25 September 2019	205 days	17 April 2020	Oleg Skripochka	Jessica Meir	Hazza Al Mansouri launch Andrew R. Morgan landing	Visiting ISS (60) with Expedition 61 crew. Final flight of the Soyuz-FG launcher.
144	Soyuz MS-16	9 April 2020	195 days, 18 hours and 49 minutes	22 October 2020	Anatoli Ivanishin	Ivan Vagner	Christopher Cassidy	Visited ISS (61) with Expedition 63 crew. First crewed flight using the Soyuz-2.1a launcher.
145	Soyuz MS-17	14 October 2020	185 days	17 April 2021	Sergey Ryzhikov	Sergey Kud-Sverchkov	Kathleen Rubins	Visiting ISS (62) with Expedition 64 crew.
146	Soyuz MS-18	9 April 2021	190 days	17 October 2021	Oleg Novitsky	Pyotr Dubrov launch Klim Shipenko landing	Mark Vande Hei launch Yulia Peresild landing	ISS crew rotation
147	Soyuz MS-19	5 October 2021	176 days	30 March 2022	Anton Shkaplerov	Klim Shipenko launch Pyotr Dubrov landing	Yulia Peresild launch Mark Vande Hei landing	ISS crew rotation and a mission for filming The Challenge movie.
148	Soyuz MS-20	8 December 2021	12 days	20 December 2021	Aleksandr Misurkin	Yusaku Maezawa	Yozo Hirano	ISS tourist mission
149	Soyuz MS-21	18 March 2022	195 days	29 September 2022	Oleg Artemyev	Denis Matveev	Sergey Korsakov	ISS crew rotation
150	Soyuz MS-22	21 September 2022	187 days, 21 hours and 52 minutes	28 March 2023	Sergey Prokopyev launch	Dmitriy Petelin launch	Francisco Rubio launch	ISS crew rotation, spacecraft experienced coolant leak in orbit, returned to Earth uncrewed
151	Soyuz MS-23	24 February 2023	215 days, 10 hours and 53 minutes	27 September 2023	Sergey Prokopyev landing	Dmitriy Petelin landing	Francisco Rubio landing	Recovery of Soyuz MS-22 from ISS
152	Soyuz MS-24	15 September 2023	203 days, 15 hours and 33 minutes	6 April 2024	Oleg Kononenko launch Oleg Novitsky landing	Nikolai Chub launch Maryna Vasileuskaya^{1} landing	Loral O'Hara	ISS crew rotation
153	Soyuz MS-25	23 March 2024	183 days, 23 hours, 22 minutes	23 September 2024	Oleg Novitsky launch Oleg Kononenko landing	Maryna Vasileuskaya^{1} launch Nikolai Chub landing	Tracy Caldwell-Dyson	ISS crew rotation
154	Soyuz MS-26	11 September 2024	220 days, 8 hours, 57 minutes	20 April 2025	Aleksey Ovchinin	Ivan Vagner	Donald Pettit	ISS crew rotation
155	Soyuz MS-27	8 April 2025	244 days, 23 hours, 16 minutes	9 December 2025	Sergey Ryzhikov	Alexey Zubritsky	Jonny Kim	ISS crew rotation
156	Soyuz MS-28	27 November 2025	241 days, 59 minutes	26 July 2026	Sergey Kud-Sverchkov	Sergey Mikayev	Christopher Williams	ISS crew rotation
157	Soyuz MS-29	14 July 2026	265 days (planned)	5 April 2027 (planned)	Pyotr Dubrov	Anna Kikina	Anil Menon	ISS crew rotation

=== Future crewed flights ===
Order	Mission	launch	Duration	landing	Crew			Notes
158	Soyuz MS-30	24 March 2027 (planned)	240 days (planned)	November 2027 (planned)	Dmitry Petelin	Konstantin Borisov	Deniz Burnham	ISS crew rotation
159	Soyuz MS-31	November 2027 (planned)	240 days (planned)	July 2028 (planned)	Oleg Kononenko	Alexander Grebenkin	TBA	ISS crew rotation
160	Soyuz MS-32	July 2028 (planned)	240 days (planned)	March 2029 (planned)	Nikolai Chub	Aleksandr Gorbunov	TBA	ISS crew rotation

== Notes ==
^{1} Commercially funded cosmonaut or other "spaceflight participant".

== See also ==
- List of Progress flights, with all flights of the Progress resupply craft that is based on the Soyuz
