= Roscosmos Cosmonaut Corps =

Russian space program organization

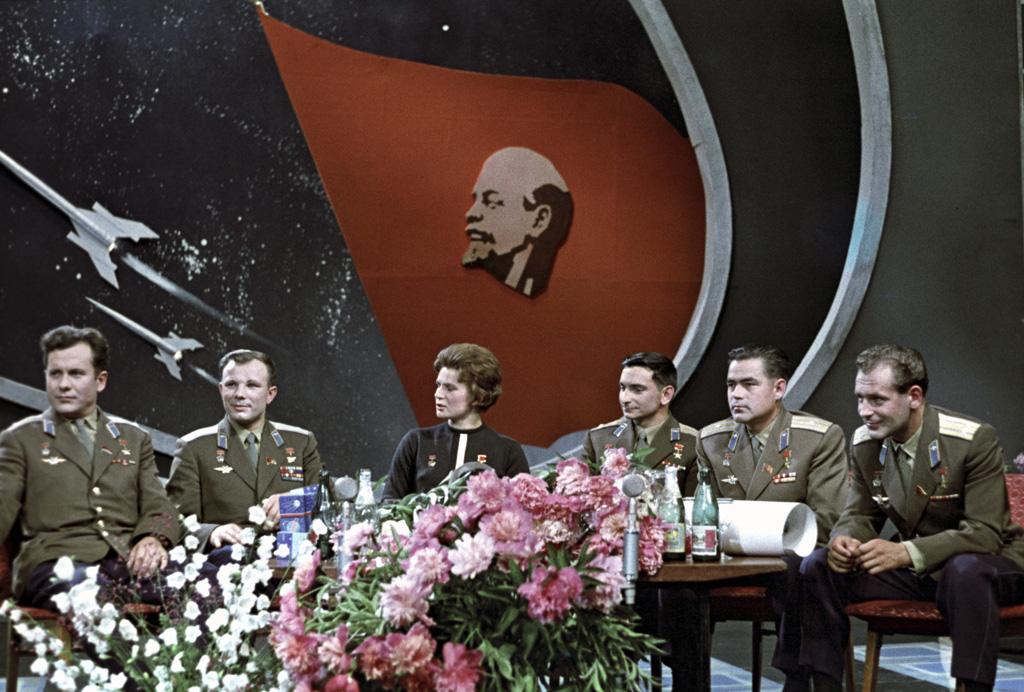
Some of the first cosmonauts make a television appearance from a Moscow studio in March 1963. From left: Pavel Popovich, Yuri Gagarin, Valentina Tereshkova, Valery Bykovsky, Andrian Nikolayev and Gherman Titov.

The Cosmonaut Corps (Russian: Отряд космонавтов) is a unit of the Russia's Roscosmos state corporation that selects, trains, and provides cosmonauts as crew members for the Russian Federation and international space missions. It is part of the Yuri Gagarin Cosmonaut Training Center, based at Star City in Moscow Oblast, Russia.

== History ==
The development of Soviet science and technology made it possible, by the end of the 1950s, to consider the issues of crewed space flight. At the beginning of 1959, the President of the USSR Academy of Sciences Mstislav Keldysh held a meeting at which questions about crewed space flight were discussed specifically, right down to "who should fly?". The decision on the selection and training of astronauts for the first space flight on the spacecraft "Vostok" was made in the Resolution of the Central Committee of the Communist Party and the Council of Ministers of the USSR No. 22-10 "On the medical selection of candidates for astronauts", dated January 5, 1959, and in the Resolution Council of Ministers of the USSR No. 569-264 "On the preparation of man for space flights", May 22, 1959.

The selection of candidates for cosmonauts corps was entrusted to the command of the Air Force of the Armed Forces, military doctors and medical flight commissions, which monitored the health of pilots in units and formations, and the training of future cosmonauts was entrusted to the Air Force of the Armed Forces of the USSR. Later, the selection was directly entrusted to a group of specialists from the Central Military Research Aviation Hospital (TsVNIAH).

The cosmonaut corps was formed on January 11, 1960, by the order of the Commander-in-Chief of the Air Force of the Armed Forces of the USSR, dated March 7, 1960, the first 12 pilots who passed the initial selection were appointed to the post of listener-cosmonauts of the Air Force; The first cosmonaut corps, which included the future first cosmonaut of Yuri Gagarin, consisted of twenty people. On March 23, 1961, Yuri Gagarin was appointed as the commander of the cosmonaut corps.

The first Cosmonauts Corps was military unit No. 26266, which formed with the task of training cosmonauts, and a little later it was transformed into the Cosmonaut Training Center of the Air Force of the Armed Forces.

After the dissolution of the Soviet Union, the Corps became partly civilian and was managed by the Russian Space and Aviation Agency (RKA).

== Organization ==
The Cosmonaut Corps is based at the Yuri Gagarin Cosmonaut Training Center in Star City, Russia, although members may be assigned to other locations based on mission requirements.

The Chief of the Cosmonaut Office is the most senior leadership position for active cosmonauts in the Corps. The Chief serves as head of the Corps and is the principal adviser to the Roscosmos Director-General on cosmonaut training and operations. The first Chief Astronaut was Yuri Gagarin, appointed in 1960. The current Chief is Maksim Kharlamov.

== Requirements ==
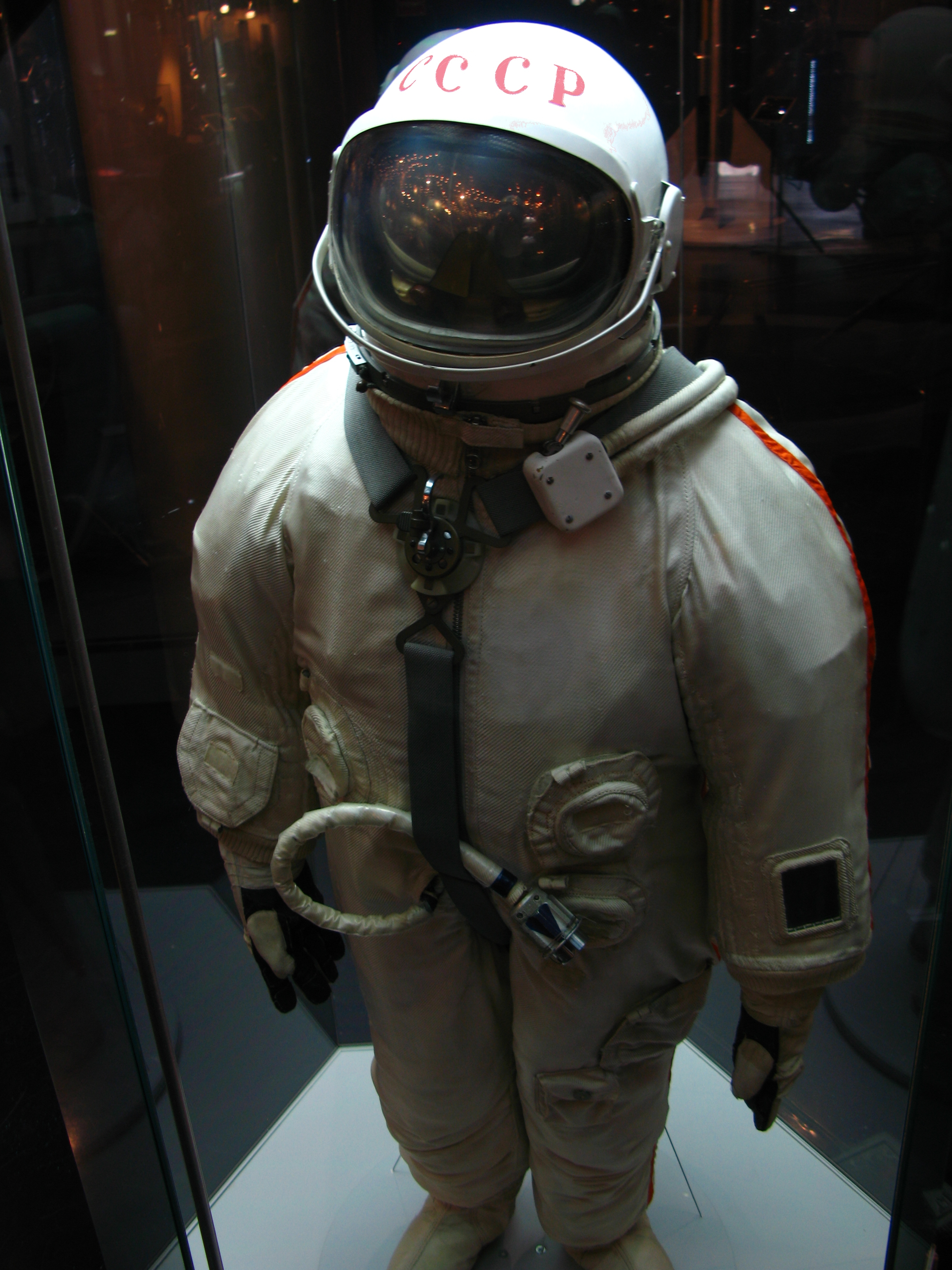
A Soviet space skafander in the Museum of Cosmonautics, Moscow

In order to enter the cosmonaut corps, a candidate for the role of a space pilot must pass medical and psychological tests (in the Central Research Aviation Hospital), as well as undergo a face-to-face interview. During the Soviet era, in addition, membership in the Communist Party of the Soviet Union was also a prerequisite for joining the cosmonaut corps.

The main current requirements for joining the cosmonaut corps are to be with Russian citizenship, age up to 35 years, have higher education, have knowledge of English, successfully pass medical and psychological tests, and have body weight up to 90 kilograms (200 lb).

== List of active cosmonauts ==
As of October 2026, the corps has 21 "active" cosmonauts consisting of 1 woman and 20 men. All of the current members of the cosmonaut corps were selected in 1996 or later.

Missions underlined are in progress. Missions in italics are scheduled and subject to change.

Cosmonaut	Missions	Group
Konstantin Borisov	SpaceX Crew-7 (Expedition 69/70); Soyuz MS-30 (Expedition 75/76)	2018
Nikolai Chub	Soyuz MS-24/MS-25 (Expedition 69/70/71); Soyuz MS-32 (Expedition 77/78)	2012
Pyotr Dubrov	Soyuz MS-18/MS-19 (Expedition 64/65/66); Soyuz MS-29 (Expedition 74/75)	2012
Andrey Fedyaev	SpaceX Crew-6 (Expedition 68/69); SpaceX Crew-12 (Expedition 74/75)	2012
Aleksandr Gorbunov	SpaceX Crew-9 (Expedition 72); Soyuz MS-32 (Expedition 77/78)	2018
Alexander Grebenkin	SpaceX Crew-8 (Expedition 70/71/72); Soyuz MS-31 (Expedition 76/77)	2018
Anna Kikina	SpaceX Crew-5 (Expedition 67/68); Soyuz MS-29 (Expedition 74/75)	2012
Harutyun Kiviryan	SpaceX Crew-14 (Expedition 75/76)	2021
Alexander Kolyabin	None, awaiting assignment	2021
Oleg Kononenko	Soyuz TMA-12 (Expedition 17); Soyuz TMA-03M (Expedition 30/31); Soyuz TMA-17M (Expedition 44/45); Soyuz MS-11 (Expedition 57/58/59); Soyuz MS-24/MS-25 (Expedition 69/70/71); Soyuz MS-31 (Expedition 76/77)	1996
Sergey Kud-Sverchkov	Soyuz MS-17 (Expedition 63/64); Soyuz MS-28 (Expedition 73/74)	2010
Sergey Mikayev	Soyuz MS-28 (Expedition 73/74)	2018
Aleksey Ovchinin	Soyuz TMA-20M (Expedition 47/48); Soyuz MS-10 (aborted); Soyuz MS-12 (Expedition 59/60); Soyuz MS-26 (Expedition 71/72)	2006
Kirill Peskov	SpaceX Crew-10 (Expedition 72/73)	2018
Dmitry Petelin	Soyuz MS-22/MS-23 (Expedition 67/68/69); Soyuz MS-30 (Expedition 75/76)	2012
Oleg Platonov	SpaceX Crew-11 (Expedition 73/74)	2018
Sergey Prokopyev	Soyuz MS-09 (Expedition 56/57); Soyuz MS-22/MS-23 (Expedition 67/68/69)	2010
Sergey Ryzhikov	Soyuz MS-02 (Expedition 49/50); Soyuz MS-17 (Expedition 63/64); Soyuz MS-27 (Expedition 72/73)	2006
Sergey Teteryatnikov	SpaceX Crew-13 (Expedition 75)	2021
Ivan Vagner	Soyuz MS-16 (Expedition 62/63); Soyuz MS-26 (Expedition 71/72)	2010
Alexey Zubritsky	Soyuz MS-27 (Expedition 72/73)	2018

== List of former cosmonauts (partial) ==
=== Russia and the Soviet Union ===
The Soviet space program came under the control of the Russian Federation in December 1991; the new program, now called the Russian Federal Space Agency, retained continuity of equipment and personnel with the Soviet program. While all Soviet and RKA cosmonauts were born within the borders of the U.S.S.R., many were born outside the boundaries of Russia, and may be claimed by other Soviet successor states as nationals of those states. These cosmonauts are marked with an asterisk * and their place of birth is shown in an appended list. All, however, claimed Soviet or Russian citizenship at the time of their space flights.

==== A ====
- Viktor Mikhaylovich Afanasyev — (Soviet Union) Soyuz TM-11, (Russia) Soyuz TM-18, Soyuz TM-29, Soyuz TM-33/32
- Vladimir Aksyonov (1935–2024) — (Soviet Union) Soyuz 22, Soyuz T-2
- Aleksandr Pavlovich Aleksandrov — (Soviet Union) Soyuz T-9, Soyuz TM-3
- Ivan Anikeyev (1933–1992) — (Soviet Union) Expelled from Vostok program; no flights.
- Oleg Artemyev — (Russia) Soyuz TMA-12M, Soyuz MS-08, Soyuz MS-21
- Anatoly Artsebarsky* — (Soviet Union) Soyuz TM-12
- Yuri Artyukhin (1930–1998) — (Soviet Union) Soyuz 14
- Oleg Atkov — (Soviet Union) Soyuz T-10/11
- Toktar Aubakirov* — (Soviet Union) Soyuz TM-13/12
- Sergei Avdeyev — (Russia) Soyuz TM-15, Soyuz TM-22

==== B ====
- Andrei Babkin — (Russia) No flights.
- Aleksandr Balandin — (Soviet Union) Soyuz TM-9
- Yuri Baturin — (Russia) Soyuz TM-28/27, Soyuz TM-32/31
- Pavel Belyayev (1925–1970) — (Soviet Union) Voskhod 2
- Georgi Beregovoi* (1921–1995) — (Soviet Union) Soyuz 3
- Anatoly Berezovoy (1942–2014) — (Soviet Union) Soyuz T-5/7
- Valentin Bondarenko (1937–1961) — (Soviet Union) No flights.
- Andrey Borisenko — (Russia) Soyuz TMA-21, Soyuz MS-02
- Nikolai Budarin — (Russia) STS-71/Soyuz TM-21, Soyuz TM-27, STS-113/Soyuz TMA-1
- Valery Bykovsky — (1934–2019) — (Soviet Union) Vostok 5, Soyuz 22, Soyuz 31/29

==== D ====
- Vladimir Dezhurov — (Russia) Soyuz TM-21/STS-71
- Georgy Dobrovolsky* (1928–1971), Died on reentry. — (Soviet Union) Soyuz 11
- Lev Dyomin (1926–1998) — (Soviet Union) Soyuz 15
- Vladimir Dzhanibekov* — (Soviet Union) Soyuz 27/26, Soyuz 39, Soyuz T-12, Soyuz T-13

==== F ====
- Konstantin Feoktistov (1926–2009) — (Soviet Union) Voskhod 1
- Valentin Filatyev (1930–1990) — (Soviet Union) Expelled from Vostok program; no flights.
- Anatoly Filipchenko (1928–2022) — (Soviet Union) Soyuz 7, Soyuz 16

==== G ====
- Yuri Gagarin (1934–1968), First person in space. — (Soviet Union) Vostok 1
- Yuri Gidzenko* — (Russia) Soyuz TM-22, Soyuz TM-31/STS-102, Soyuz TM-34/Soyuz TM-33
- Yuri Glazkov (1939–2008) — (Soviet Union) Soyuz 24
- Viktor Gorbatko (1934–2017) — (Soviet Union) Soyuz 7, Soyuz 24, Soyuz 37/36
- Georgi Grechko (1931–2017) — (Soviet Union) Soyuz 17, Soyuz 26/27, Soyuz T-14/13
- Aleksei Gubarev (1931–2015) — (Soviet Union) Soyuz 17, Soyuz 28

==== I ====
- Aleksandr Ivanchenkov — (Soviet Union) Soyuz 29/31, Soyuz T-6,
- Anatoli Ivanishin — (Russia) Soyuz TMA-22, Soyuz MS-01, Soyuz MS-16,

==== K ====
- Aleksandr Kaleri* — (Russia) Soyuz TM-14, Soyuz TM-24, Soyuz TM-30, Soyuz TMA-3, Soyuz TMA-01M
- Yevgeny Khrunov (1933–2000) — (Soviet Union) Soyuz 5/4
- Leonid Kizim* (1941–2010) — (Soviet Union) Soyuz T-3, Soyuz T-10/11, Soyuz T-15
- Pyotr Klimuk* — (Soviet Union) Soyuz 13, Soyuz 18, Soyuz 30
- Vladimir Komarov (1927–1967), Died on reentry. — (Soviet Union) Voskhod 1, Soyuz 1
- Yelena V. Kondakova — (Russia) Soyuz TM-20/STS-84
- Dmitri Kondratyev — (Russia) Soyuz TMA-20
- Mikhail Korniyenko — (Russia) Soyuz TMA-18, Soyuz TMA-16M/18M
- Sergey Korsakov — (Russia) Soyuz MS-21
- Valery Korzun — (Russia) Soyuz TM-24, STS-111/113
- Oleg Kotov* — (Russia) Soyuz TMA-10, Soyuz TMA-17, Soyuz TMA-10M
- Vladimir Kovalyonok* — (Soviet Union) Soyuz 25, Soyuz 29/31, Soyuz T-4
- Konstantin Kozeyev — (Russia) Soyuz TM-33/32
- Sergei Krikalev — (Soviet Union) Soyuz TM-7, Soyuz TM-12/ (Russia) Soyuz TM-13, STS-60, STS-88, Soyuz TM-31/STS-102, Soyuz TMA-6
- Valeri Kubasov (1935–2014) — (Soviet Union) Soyuz 6, Soyuz 19, Soyuz 36/35

==== L ====
- Aleksandr Laveykin — (Soviet Union) Soyuz TM-2
- Vasili Lazarev (1928–1990) — (Soviet Union) Soyuz 12, Soyuz 18a
- Aleksandr Lazutkin — (Russia) Soyuz TM-25
- Valentin Lebedev — (Soviet Union) Soyuz 13, Soyuz T-5/7
- Alexei Leonov (1934–2019) — (Soviet Union) Voskhod 2 (first walk in space), Soyuz 19
- Anatoli Levchenko* (1941–1988) — (Soviet Union) Soyuz TM-4/3
- Yuri Lonchakov* — (Russia) STS-100, Soyuz TMA-1/TM-34, Soyuz TMA-13
- Vladimir Lyakhov* (1941–2018) — (Soviet Union) Soyuz 32/34, Soyuz T-9, Soyuz TM-6/5

==== M ====
- Oleg Makarov (1933–2003) — (Soviet Union) Soyuz 12, Soyuz 18a, Soyuz 27/26, Soyuz T-3
- Yuri Malenchenko* — (Russia) Soyuz TM-19, STS-106, Soyuz TMA-2, Soyuz TMA-11, Soyuz TMA-05M, Soyuz TMA-19M,
- Yury Malyshev (1941–1999) — (Soviet Union) Soyuz T-2, Soyuz T-11/10
- Gennadi Manakov (1950–2019) — (Soviet Union) Soyuz TM-10, (Russia) Soyuz TM-16
- Denis Matveev* — (Russia) Soyuz MS-21
- Musa Manarov* — (Soviet Union) Soyuz TM-4/6, Soyuz TM-11
- Alexander Misurkin — (Russia) Soyuz TMA-08M, Soyuz MS-06, Soyuz MS-20
- Boris Morukov (1950–2015) — (Russia) STS-106
- Talgat Musabayev* — (Russia) Soyuz TM-19, Soyuz TM-27, Soyuz TM-32/31

==== N ====
- Grigori Nelyubov (1934–1966) — (Soviet Union) Expelled from Vostok program, no flights.
- Andriyan Nikolayev (1929–2004) — (Soviet Union) Vostok 3, Soyuz 9
- Oleg Novitsky — (Russia) Soyuz TMA-06M (Expedition 33/34), Soyuz MS-03 (Expedition 50/51), Soyuz MS-18 (Expedition 64/65), Soyuz MS-25/MS-24

==== O ====
- Yuri Onufrienko* — (Russia) Soyuz TM-23, STS-108/111

==== P ====
- Gennady Padalka — (Russia) Soyuz TM-28, Soyuz TMA-4, Soyuz TMA-14, Soyuz TMA-04M, Soyuz TMA-16M
- Viktor Patsayev* (1933–1971), Died on reentry. — (Soviet Union) Soyuz 11
- Aleksandr Poleshchuk — (Russia) Soyuz TM-16
- Valeri Polyakov (1942–2022) — (Soviet Union) Soyuz TM-6/7, (Russia) Soyuz TM-18/20
- Leonid Popov* — (Soviet Union) Soyuz 35/37, Soyuz 40, Soyuz T-7/5
- Pavel Popovich* (1930–2009) — (Soviet Union) Vostok 4, Soyuz 14

==== R ====
- Sergey Revin — (Russia) Soyuz TMA-04M
- Roman Romanenko — (Russia) Soyuz TMA-15, Soyuz TMA-07M
- Yuri Romanenko — (Soviet Union) Soyuz 26/27, Soyuz 38, Soyuz TM-2/3
- Valery Rozhdestvensky (1939–2011) — (Soviet Union) Soyuz 23
- Nikolai Rukavishnikov (1932–2002) — (Soviet Union) Soyuz 10, Soyuz 16, Soyuz 33
- Sergey Ryazansky — (Russia) Soyuz TMA-10M, Soyuz MS-05
- Valery Ryumin (1939–2022) — (Soviet Union) Soyuz 25, Soyuz 32/34, Soyuz 35/37, (Russia) STS-91

==== S ====
- Aleksandr Samokutyayev — (Russia) Soyuz TMA-21, Soyuz TMA-14M
- Gennadi Sarafanov (1942–2005) — (Soviet Union) Soyuz 15
- Viktor Savinykh — (Soviet Union) Soyuz T-4, Soyuz T-13/14, Soyuz TM-3,
- Svetlana Savitskaya — (Soviet Union) Soyuz T-7/5, Soyuz T-12
- Aleksandr Serebrov (1944–2013) — (Soviet Union) Soyuz T-7/5, Soyuz T-8, Soyuz TM-8, (Russia) Soyuz TM-17
- Yelena Serova — (Russia) Soyuz TMA-14M
- Vitali Sevastyanov (1935–2010) — (Soviet Union) Soyuz 9, Soyuz 18
- Yuri Shargin — (Russia) Soyuz TMA-5/4
- Salizhan Sharipov* — (Russia) STS-89, Soyuz TMA-5
- Vladimir Shatalov* (1927–2021) — (Soviet Union) Soyuz 4, Soyuz 8, Soyuz 10
- Anton Shkaplerov — (Russia) Soyuz TMA-22, Soyuz TMA-15M, Soyuz MS-07, Soyuz MS-19
- Georgi Shonin* (1935–1997) — (Soviet Union) Soyuz 6
- Oleg Skripochka — (Russia) Soyuz TMA-01M, Soyuz TMA-20M, Soyuz MS-15
- Aleksandr Skvortsov — (Russia) Soyuz TMA-18, Soyuz MS-13
- Anatoly Solovyev* — (Soviet Union) Soyuz TM-5/4, Soyuz TM-9, (Russia) Soyuz TM-15, STS-71/Soyuz TM-21, Soyuz TM-26
- Vladimir Solovyov — (Soviet Union) Soyuz T-10/11, Soyuz T-15
- Gennadi Strekalov (1940–2004) — (Soviet Union) Soyuz T-3, Soyuz T-8, Soyuz T-11/10, Soyuz TM-10, (Russia) Soyuz TM-21/STS-71
- Maksim Surayev — (Russia) Soyuz TMA-16, Soyuz TMA-13M

==== T ====
- Yevgeni Tarelkin — (Russia) Soyuz TMA-06M
- Valentina Tereshkova, First woman in space. — (Soviet Union) Vostok 6
- Gherman Titov (1935–2000) — (Soviet Union) Vostok 2
- Vladimir Titov — (Soviet Union) Soyuz T-8, Soyuz TM-4/6, (Russia) STS-63, STS-86
- Valeri Tokarev — (Russia) STS-96, Soyuz TMA-7
- Sergei Treshchov — (Russia) STS-111/113
- Vasili Tsibliyev* — (Russia) Soyuz TM-17, Soyuz TM-25
- Mikhail Tyurin — (Russia) STS-105/108, Soyuz TMA-9, Soyuz TMA-11M

==== U ====
- Yuri Usachov — (Russia) Soyuz TM-18, Soyuz TM-23, STS-101, STS-102/STS-105

==== V ====
- Vladimir Vasyutin* (1952–2002) — (Soviet Union) Soyuz T-14
- Aleksandr Viktorenko* — (Soviet Union) Soyuz TM-3/2, Soyuz TM-8, (Russia) Soyuz TM-14, Soyuz TM-20
- Pavel Vinogradov — (Russia) Soyuz TM-26, Soyuz TMA-8, Soyuz TMA-08M
- Igor Volk* (1937–2017) — (Soviet Union) Soyuz T-12
- Alexander Volkov* — (Soviet Union) Soyuz T-14, Soyuz TM-7, Soyuz TM-13, (Russia) Soyuz TM-13
- Sergei Aleksandrovich Volkov* — (Russia) Soyuz TMA-12, Soyuz TMA-02M
- Vladislav Volkov (1935–1971), Died on reentry. — (Soviet Union) Soyuz 7, Soyuz 11
- Boris Volynov — (Soviet Union) Soyuz 5, Soyuz 21
- Sergei Vozovikov (1958–1993), drowned during survival training program — (Russia) No flights.

==== Y ====
- Boris Yegorov (1937–1994) — (Soviet Union) Voskhod 1
- Aleksei Yeliseyev — (Soviet Union) Soyuz 5/4, Soyuz 8, Soyuz 10
- Fyodor Yurchikhin* — (Russia) STS-112, Soyuz TMA-10, Soyuz TMA-19, Soyuz TMA-09M, Soyuz MS-04

==== Z ====
- Dmitri Zaikin (1932–2013) — (Soviet Union) No flights.
- Sergei Zalyotin — (Russia) Soyuz TM-30, Soyuz TMA-1/TM-34
- Vitali Zholobov* — (Soviet Union) Soyuz 21
- Vyacheslav Zudov — (Soviet Union) Soyuz 23

==== Soviet and Russian cosmonauts born outside Russia ====
All of the locations below were part of the former U.S.S.R. at the time of the cosmonauts' birth.

===== Azerbaidzhan S.S.R. / Azerbaijan =====
- Musa Manarov, born in Baku, Azerbaijan (Soviet Union)

===== Byelorussian S.S.R. / Belarus =====
- Pyotr Klimuk, born in Komarovka, Belarus (Soviet Union)
- Vladimir Kovalyonok, born in Beloye, Belarus (Soviet Union)
- Oleg Novitski, born in Chervyen', Belarus (Russia)

===== Georgian S.S.R. / Georgia =====
- Fyodor Yurchikhin, born in Batumi, Georgia (Russia)

===== Kazakh S.S.R. / Kazakhstan =====
- Toktar Aubakirov, born in Karaganda, Kazakhstan (Soviet Union)
- Yuri Lonchakov, born in Balkhash, Kazakhstan (Russia)
- Talgat Musabayev, born in Kargaly, Kazakhstan (Russia)
- Viktor Patsayev, born in Aktyubinsk, Kazakhstan (Soviet Union)
- Dmitry Petelin — born in Kustanai, Kazakhstan
- Vladimir Shatalov, born in Petropavlovsk, Kazakhstan (Soviet Union)
- Aleksandr Viktorenko, born in Olginka, Kazakhstan (Soviet Union) (Russia)

===== Kirghiz S.S.R. / Kyrgyzstan =====
- Salizhan Sharipov, born in Uzgen, Kyrgyzstan (Russia)
- Sergey Korsakov, born in Krunze, Kyrgyzstan (Russia)

===== Latvian S.S.R. / Latvia =====
- Aleksandr Kaleri, born in Jūrmala, Latvia (Russia)
- Anatoly Solovyev, born in Riga, Latvia (Soviet Union) (Russia)
- Oleg Artemyev, born in Riga, Latvia (Soviet Union) (Russia)

===== Turkmen S.S.R. / Turkmenistan =====
- Oleg Kononenko, born in Chardzhou, Turkmenistan (Russia)

===== Ukrainian S.S.R. / Ukraine =====
- Anatoly Artsebarsky, born in Prosyana, Ukraine (Soviet Union)
- Georgi Beregovoi, born in Federivka, Ukraine (Soviet Union)
- Georgiy Dobrovolskiy, born in Odessa, Ukraine (Soviet Union)
- Yuri Gidzenko, born in Yelanets, Ukraine
- Leonid Kizim, born in Krasnyi Lyman, Ukraine (Soviet Union)
- Oleg Kotov, born in Simferopol, Ukraine
- Anatoli Levchenko, born in Krasnokutsk, Ukraine (Soviet Union)
- Vladimir Lyakhov, born in Antratsyt, Ukraine (Soviet Union)
- Yuri Malenchenko, born in Svitlovodsk, Ukraine
- Yuri Onufriyenko, born in Ryasne, Ukraine
- Leonid Popov, born in Oleksandriia, Ukraine (Soviet Union)
- Pavel Popovich, born in Uzyn, Ukraine. (Soviet Union)
- Georgi Shonin, born in Rovenky, Ukraine (Soviet Union)
- Vasili Tsibliyev, born in Horikhivka, Ukraine
- Vladimir Vasyutin, born in Kharkiv, Ukraine (Soviet Union)
- Igor Volk, born in Zmiiv, Ukraine (Soviet Union)
- Aleksandr Volkov, born in Horlivka, Ukraine (Soviet Union)
- Sergey Volkov, born in Chuhuiv, Ukraine
- Vitali Zholobov, born in Zburyivka, Ukraine (Soviet Union)

===== Uzbek S.S.R. / Uzbekistan =====
- Vladimir Dzhanibekov, born in Iskandar, Uzbekistan (Soviet Union)

== See also ==
- Other astronaut corps:
  - Canadian Astronaut Corps
  - European Astronaut Corps
  - NASA Astronaut Corps (United States)
  - Indian Astronaut Corps (India)
  - JAXA Astronaut Corps (Japan)
  - People's Liberation Army Astronaut Corps (China)
- Intercosmos, a Soviet space program designed to give nations on friendly relations with the Soviet Union access to crewed and uncrewed space missions
- Roscosmos, the program's eventual post-Soviet continuation under the Russian Federation
- Pilot-Cosmonaut of the USSR and Pilot-Cosmonaut of the Russian Federation, an honorary titles
- List of Soviet human spaceflight missions
- List of Russian human spaceflight missions
