= List of French astronauts =

List of French spationauts

The following is a list of French astronauts, also referred to as spationauts, who have traveled into space, sorted by date of first flight.

As of 2024, ten French nationals have been in space. The first French national in space was Jean-Loup Chrétien in 1982. The first female spationaut was Claudie Haigneré, née André-Deshays, who traveled to Mir in 1996.

Jean-Loup Chrétien and Jean-François Clervoy are the only French nationals to have been in space three times. Jean-Pierre Haigneré and Thomas Pesquet are the only French nationals to have made long-term spaceflights.

== List ==
Image	Name	Mission	Mission start	Mission duration	Space station	Mission objectives	Ref.
	Jean-Loup Chrétien	Soyuz T-6	June 24, 1982	7 days, 21 hours, 50 minutes	Salyut 7		
	Jean-Loup Chrétien	Soyuz TM-7 / Soyuz TM-6	November 26, 1988	24 days, 17 hours, 52 minutes	Mir	Mir Aragatz mission	
	Jean-Loup Chrétien	STS-86	September 26, 1997	10 days, 19 hours, 22 minutes	Mir	Seventh Shuttle-Mir Docking	
	Patrick Baudry	STS-51-G	June 17, 1985	7 days, 1 hour, 38 minutes		Deployed three communications satellites, all attached to Payload Assist Module-D (PAM-D)	
	Michel Tognini	Soyuz TM-15 / Soyuz TM-14	July 27, 1992	14 days	Mir		
	Michel Tognini	STS-93	July 23, 1999	4 days, 22 hours, 49 minutes		Delivered the Chandra X-ray Observatory	
	Jean-Pierre Haigneré	Soyuz TM-17 / Soyuz TM-16	July 1, 1993	21 days	Mir		
	Jean-Pierre Haigneré	Soyuz TM-29	February 20, 1999	188 days, 20 hours, 16 minutes	Mir		
	Jean-François Clervoy	STS-66	November 3, 1994	10 days, 22 hours, 34 minutes		Conducted experiments on the Atmospheric Laboratory for Applications and Science-3 (ATLAS-3) and the Cryogenic Infrared Spectrometers and Telescopes for the Atmosphere-Shuttle Pallet Satellite (CRISTA-SPAS) payloads	
	Jean-François Clervoy	STS-84	May 15, 1997	9 days, 4 hours, 19 minutes	Mir	Sixth Shuttle-Mir Docking	
	Jean-François Clervoy	STS-103	December 20, 1999	7 days, 23 hours, 11 minutes		Third Hubble Space Telescope Servicing Mission	
	Jean-Jacques Favier	STS-78	June 20, 1996	16 days, 21 hours, 48 minutes		Conducted Life and Microgravity Spacelab (LMS) experiments	
	Claudie Haigneré	Soyuz TM-24 / Soyuz TM-23	August 17, 1996	16 days	Mir		
	Claudie Haigneré	Soyuz TM-33 / Soyuz TM-32	October 21, 2001	10 days	ISS		
	Léopold Eyharts	Soyuz TM-27 / Soyuz TM-26	January 29, 1998	21 days	Mir		
	Léopold Eyharts	STS-122 / STS-123	February 8, 2008	48 days	ISS	Delivered the Japanese Kibo Logistics Module and the Canadian Dextre robotics system	
	Philippe Perrin	STS-111	June 5, 2002	13 days, 20 hours, 35 minutes	ISS		
	Thomas Pesquet	Soyuz MS-03	November 17, 2016	194 days	ISS		
	Thomas Pesquet	SpaceX Crew-2	July 21, 2021	199 days, 17 hours and 43 minutes	ISS		
	Sophie Adenot	SpaceX Crew-12	February 13, 2026	75 days (ongoing)	ISS		

== See also ==
- CNES
