= Ivan Bella =

Slovak Air Force pilot and cosmonaut (born 1964)

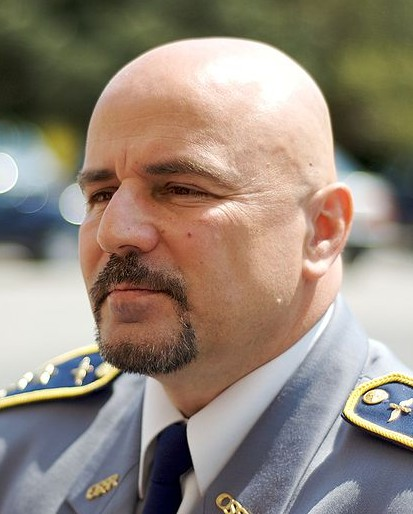
- Born: 21 May 1964 (age 62); Brezno, Czechoslovakia (present Slovakia)
- Occupation: Pilot
- Space career

Research Cosmonaut
- Rank: Brigadier general
- Time in space: 7d 21h 56min
- Selection: 1998 Cosmonaut Group
- Missions: Mir-Štefánik (Soyuz TM-29 / Soyuz TM-28)
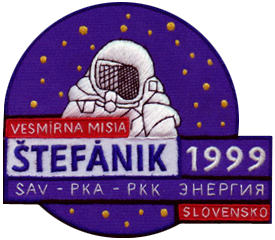
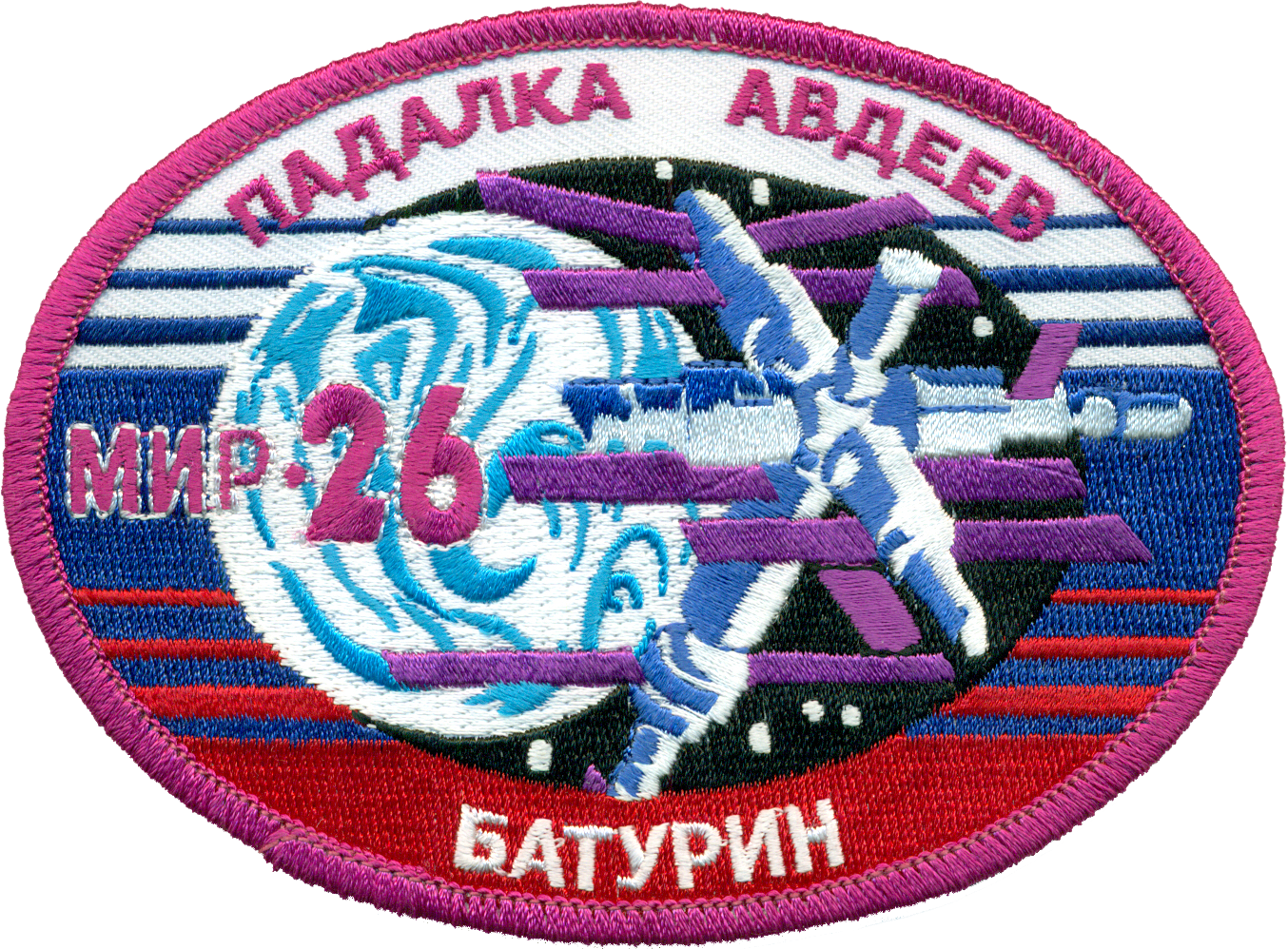
- Mission insignia

Ivan Bella (born 21 May 1964) is a Slovak Air Force officer who became the first Slovak citizen to fly in space. He participated in an eight-day joint Russian-French-Slovak mission to the Mir space station in 1999.

== Education and military career ==
Bella graduated from military school in 1983 and subsequently graduated from Košice Military Academy in 1987. He rose to the rank of lieutenant colonel in the Slovak Republic Army as a pilot at the 33rd Air Force Base in Malacky, Slovakia.

== Spaceflight ==
Bella began training as a research cosmonaut on 25 March 1998. He completed his training successfully at the Gagarin Cosmonaut Training Centre in August of the same year.

Bella launched along with mission commander Viktor Afanasyev and flight engineer Jean-Pierre Haigneré on the Soyuz TM-29 mission on 20 February 1999. TM-29 arrived at Mir on 22 February. While on board the station Bella performed various scientific experiments as well as experiments involving the possibility of survival of Japanese quails during long flights. Bella spent just over a week in space and returned to earth on 28 February aboard Soyuz TM-28 along with fellow crew member Gennady Padalka.

== Diplomatic career ==
In 2004, Bella was appointed to serve as a military attaché for Slovakia in Moscow, Russia.
