= Haigneré =

Haigneré may refer to:

- 135268 Haigneré, Main-belt asteroid
- Claudie Haigneré (born 1957), French doctor, politician, and former astronaut
- Jean-Pierre Haigneré (born 1948), French Air Force officer and a former CNES astronaut
