= Astronaute Club Européen =

French space tourism association

The Astronaute Club Européen or ACE, is a French association created on December 3, 2005 (decree of the Journal Officiel n°20050049), by Jean-Pierre Haigneré (cosmonaut), Laurent Gathier (director of space activities of Dassault Aviation and space pioneer) and Alain Dupas (Physicist, head of mission at CNES); and whose headquarters are located in the rooms of the Aéroclub de France in Paris.

== Presentation ==
Its role is to promote space tourism and sub-orbital spaceflight in Europe and to pilot the development of private parabolic and suborbital flights, and to make them available to the general public. With this purpose, the association is promoting the design and development of the suborbital crewed spacecraft (VEHRA-SH).

Since it has been created, the ACE has participated in :

- the publication of space books;
- the organisation of conferences;
- many events (conferences, congresses, etc.);
- the proposal of study topics to European universities.

== The VSH project ==
The VSH project is part of the Aerospace Student Challenge, which allows teams of European students, through collaborative work, to participate in the development of the project by addressing various aspects of the VSH system: propulsion, avionics, flight simulation but also maintenance, management, legal aspects, etc. while complying to the overall technical framework of the VSH. The name stands for VEHRA (Véhicule Hypersonique Réutilisable Aéroporté) Suborbital Habité, or Suborbital Manned ARHV (Airborne Reusable Hypersonic Vehicle), and the vehicle will be launched from a commercial aircraft, which will reach Mach 3.5 and an altitude of 100 km, the limits of space.

This VSH will be developed in close association with aeronautical and space companies:

- Dassault Aviation;
- SAFRAN;
- THALES.
