= Soyuz TM-28 =

1998 Russian crewed spaceflight to Mir

- Operator: Rosaviakosmos
- COSPAR ID: 1998-047A
- SATCAT no.: 25429
- Mission duration: 198 days, 16 hours, 31 minutes, 19 seconds
- Orbits completed: 3,144

Spacecraft properties
- Spacecraft type: Soyuz-TM
- Manufacturer: RKK Energia

Crew
- Crew size: 3 up 2 down
- Members: Gennady I. Padalka
- Launching: Sergei Avdeyev; Yuri Baturin
- Landing: Ivan Bella
- Callsign: Альтаи́р (Altair)

Start of mission
- Launch date: August 13, 1998, 09:43:11 UTC
- Rocket: Soyuz-U

End of mission
- Landing date: February 28, 1999, 02:14:30 UTC
- Landing site: 50°42′N 67°12′E; 100 kilometres (62 mi) south of Kijma

Orbital parameters
- Reference system: Geocentric
- Regime: Low Earth
- Perigee altitude: 190 kilometres (120 mi)
- Apogee altitude: 273.7 kilometres (170.1 mi)
- Inclination: 51.64 degrees
- Period: 88.5 minutes

Docking with Mir
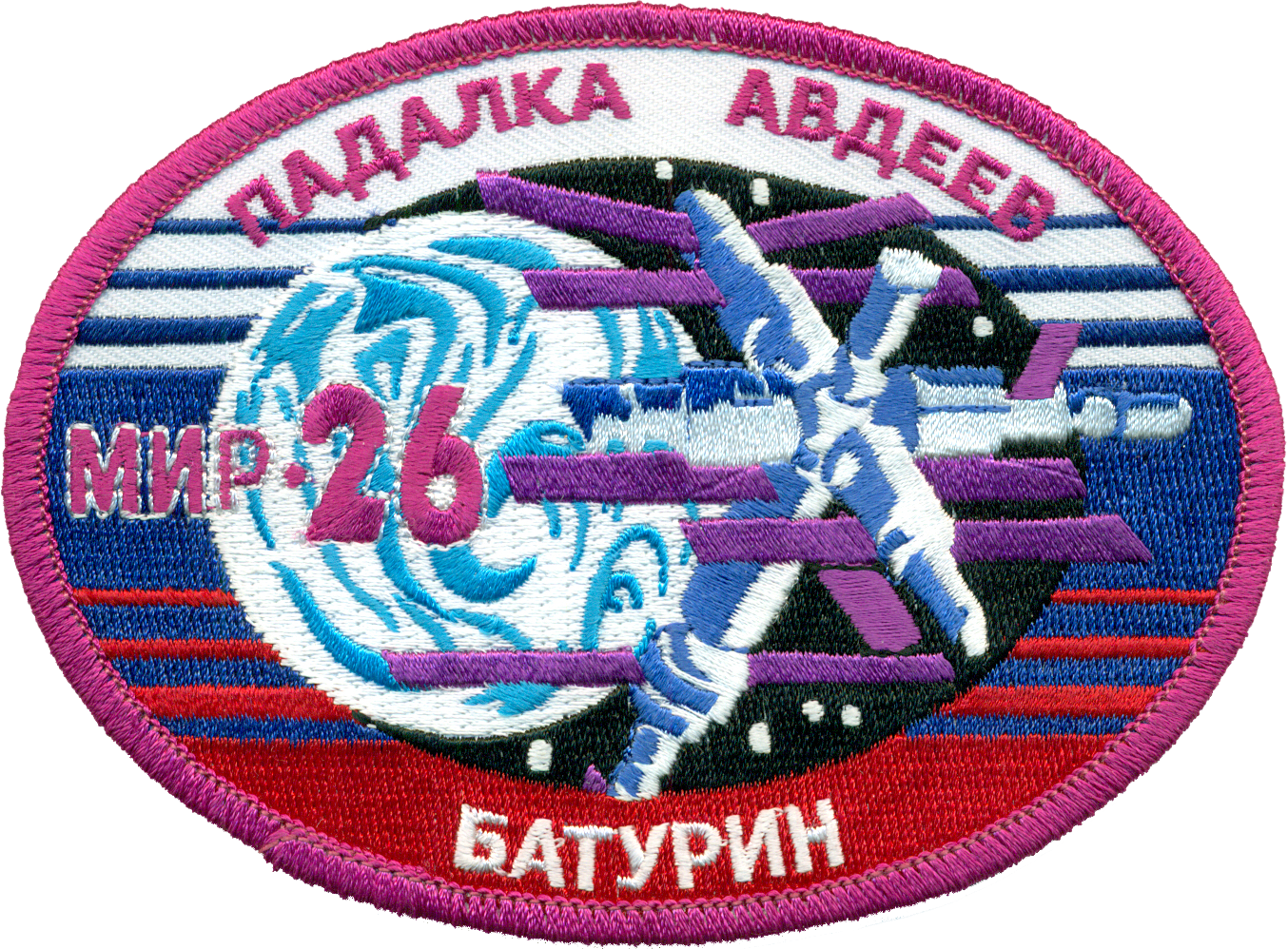
- Soyuz programme (Crewed missions)

TM-28 was a Soyuz mission to the Mir space station.

== Crew ==
Position	Launching crew	Landing crew
Commander	(Russia) Gennady I. Padalka; First spaceflight	
Flight Engineer	(Russia) Sergei Avdeyev; Third and last spaceflight	None
Research Cosmonaut	(Russia) Yuri Baturin; First spaceflight	(Slovakia) Ivan Bella; Only spaceflight

== Mission Accomplishments ==
- Docked with Mir.
- Baturin became the first Russian politician in space.
- Padalka and Avdeyev performed an EVA on 15.09.1998 (30 m) into the module Spektr (new cables connected for solar structures).

== Notes ==
- Padalka and Avdeyev became 26th resident crew of Mir.
- Baturin landed on August 25, 1998 (5:22 UT) with Soyuz TM-27.
- Avdeyev landed on August 28, 1999 (0:41 UT) with Soyuz TM-29.
