= Gennady Padalka =

Russian cosmonaut (born 1958)

- Геннадий Падалка
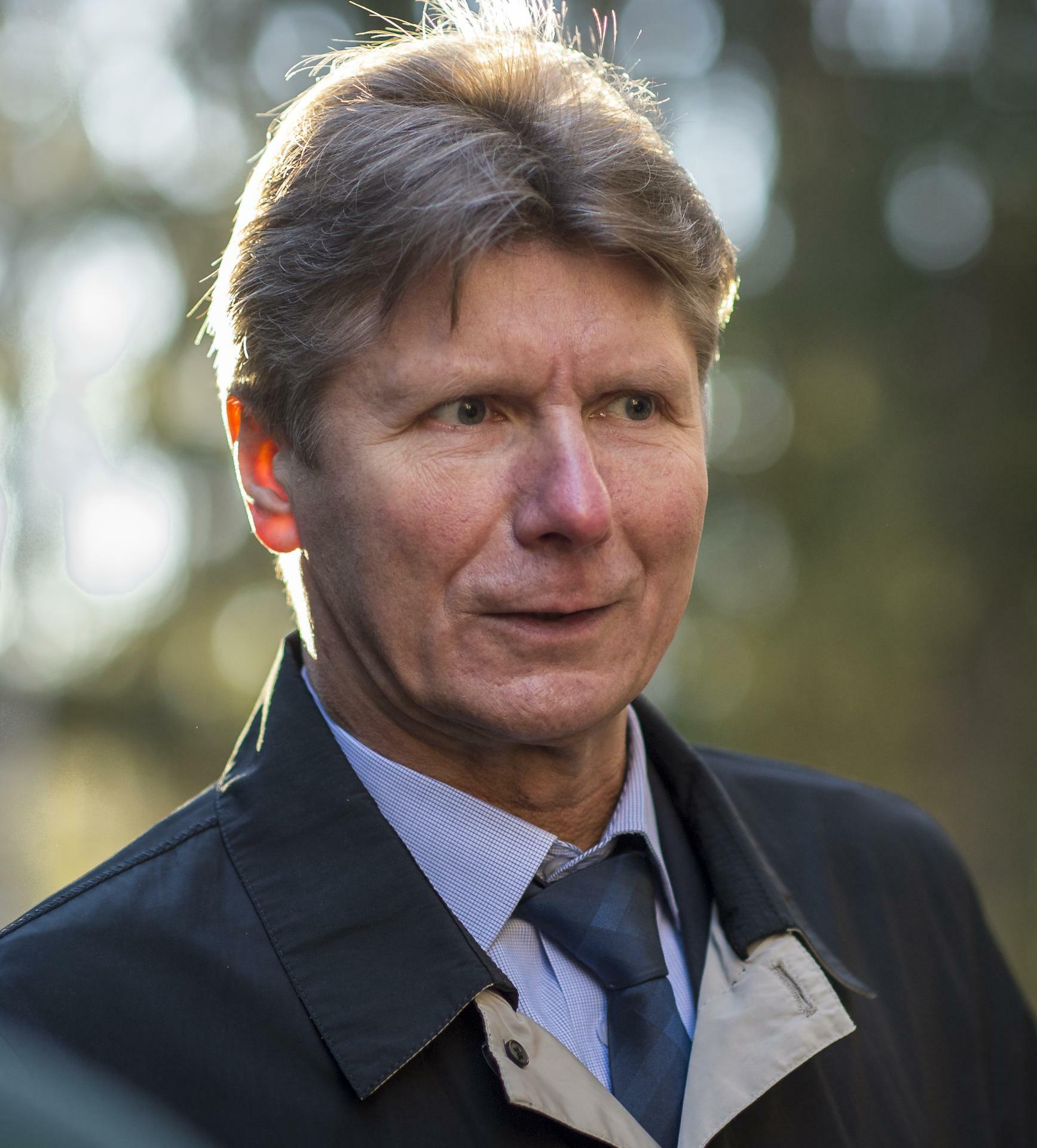
- Padalka at the Gagarin Cosmonaut Training Center in March 2015
- Born: Gennady Ivanovich Padalka; 21 June 1958 (age 68); Krasnodar, Russian SFSR, USSR
- Education: Yeysk Military Aviation College
- Occupation: Pilot
- Awards: Hero of the Russian Federation; Pilot-Cosmonaut of the Russian Federation; Order of Merit for the Fatherland
- Space career

Roscosmos cosmonaut
- Status: Retired
- Rank: Colonel, Russian Air Force
- Time in space: 878 days, 11 hours, and 29 minutes
- Selection: TsPK-10 Cosmonaut Group (1989)
- Total EVAs: 10
- Total EVA time: 38 hours and 40 minutes
- Missions: Soyuz TM-28 (Mir EO-26); Soyuz TMA-4 (Expedition 9); Soyuz TMA-14 (Expedition 19/20); Soyuz TMA-04M (Expedition 31/32); Soyuz TMA-16M (Expedition 43/44)
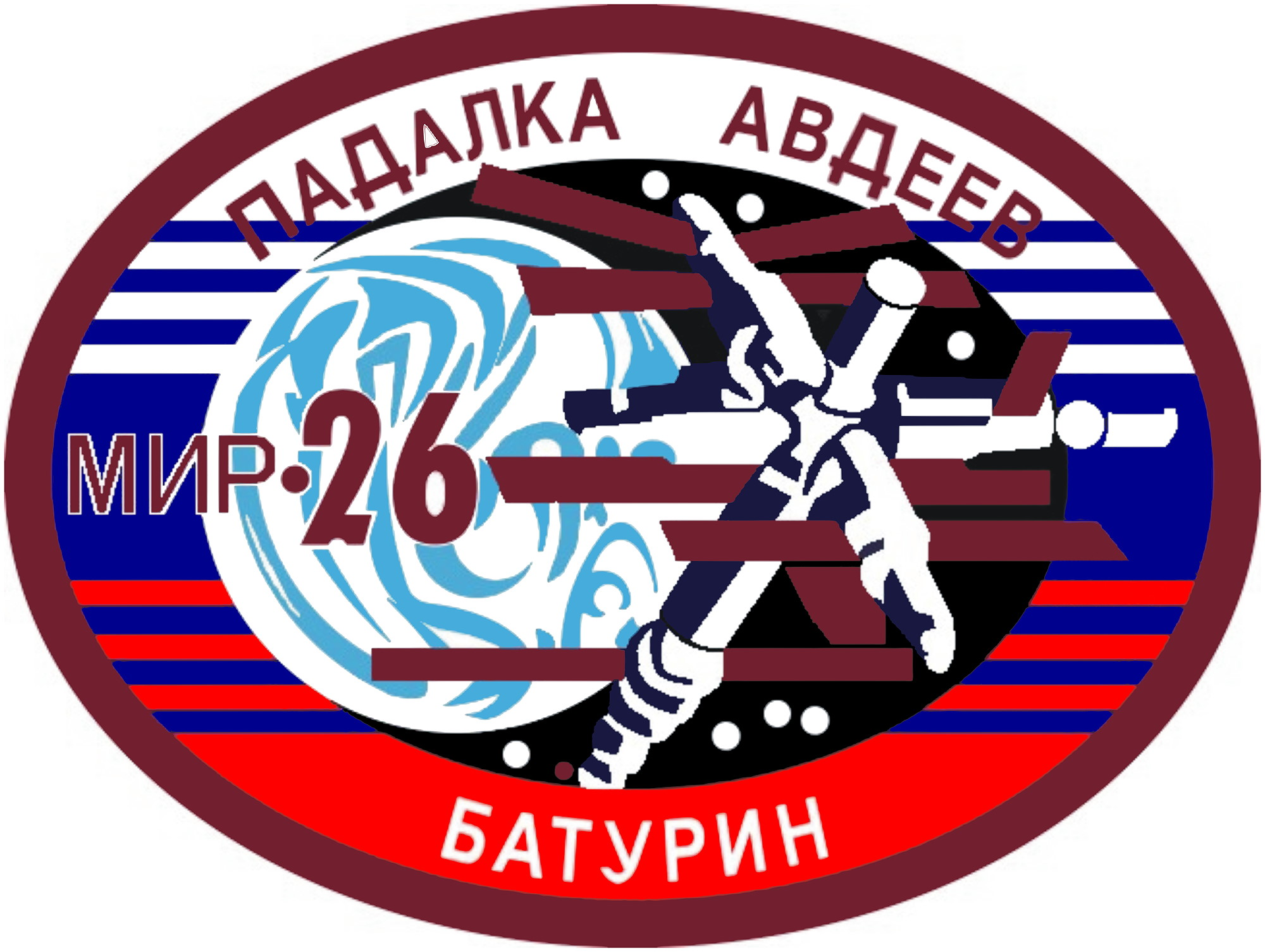
- Mission insignia
- Retired: 28 April 2017

Gennady Ivanovich Padalka (Russian: Гeнна́дий Ива́нович Па́далка; born 21 June 1958) is a Russian Air Force officer and retired Roscosmos cosmonaut. Padalka is the only person to have served as commander of the International Space Station (ISS) four times. He previously held the record for the most time spent in space at 878 days until Oleg Kononenko broke this record on February 4, 2024. He worked on both Mir and the International Space Station.

== Personal life ==
Padalka is married to Irina Anatoliyevna Padalka (Ponomareva). They have three daughters: Yuliya, Yekaterina, and Sonya. He enjoys the theater, parachute sport and diving.

== Education and training ==
Padalka graduated from Yeysk Military Aviation College in 1979. After graduation, he served as a pilot and later a senior pilot in the Russian Air Force, eventually attaining the rank of colonel. He has logged 1500 flight hours in six types of aircraft as a First Class Pilot in the Russian Air Force. In addition, he has performed more than 300 parachute jumps as an Instructor of General Parachute Training. Padalka also worked as an engineer-ecologist at the UNESCO International Center of Instruction Systems until 1994. He is an investigator for the Advanced Diagnostic Ultrasound in Microgravity Project, a US Government funded study investigating strategies for applying diagnostic telemedicine to space.

== Awards ==
Padalka is a recipient of the Hero Star of the Russian Federation and the title of Russian Federation Test-Cosmonaut. He is decorated with Fatherland Service Medal fourth class, Medals of the Russian Federation and also Medal of the International Fund of Cosmonautics support for Service to Cosmonautics. Padalka is a prize winner of the Russian Federation Government in the field of science and technology.

== Cosmonaut career ==
Gennady Padalka was selected as a cosmonaut candidate to start training at the Gagarin Cosmonaut Training Center in 1989. From June 1989 to January 1991, he attended basic space training and in 1991 was qualified as a test-cosmonaut.

=== Mir Mission ===
On 13 August 1998, Gennady launched with Sergei Avdeyev aboard Soyuz TM-28 to become the crew of Mir Expedition 26, whose primary mission was to make repairs to life support systems and prepare the station for deorbit, which was to take place after Expedition 27. On 8 February 1999 at 11:23 GMT Padalka and Avdeyev undocked from Mir's -X port in Soyuz TM-28, and redocked at the +X Kvant port at 11:39 GMT, freeing up the front port for the Soyuz TM-29 docking. He returned to Earth on board the Soyuz TM-28 capsule on 28 February 1999. The Soyuz TM-28 undocked from the Kvant rear docking port on 27 February at 22:52 GMT and landed in Kazakhstan on 28 February at 02:14 GMT. Padalka accumulated 198 days and 16 hours of space travel during the mission.

=== ISS Missions ===
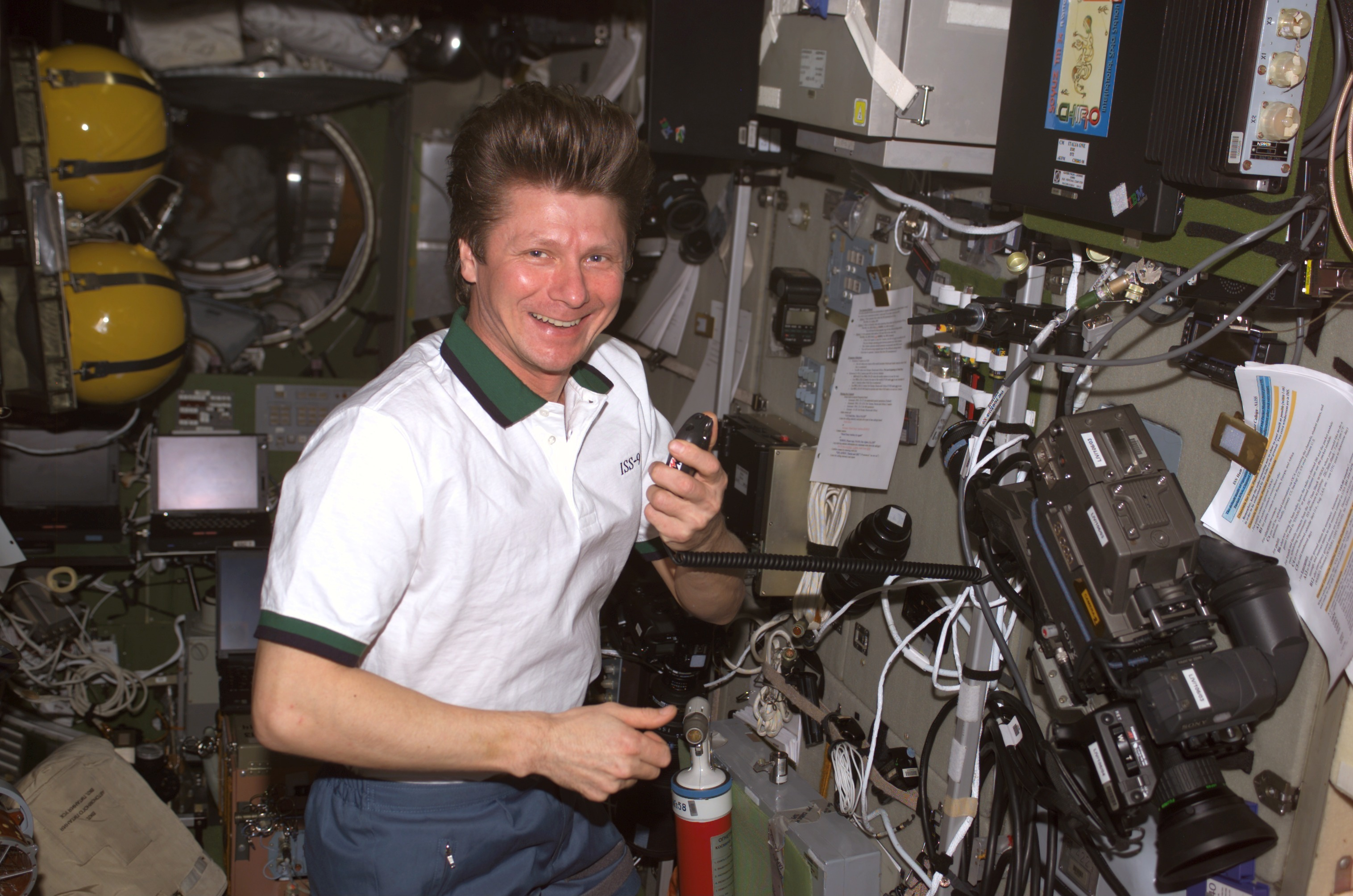
Expedition 9 commander Gennady Padalka inside the Zvezda module of the ISS.

From June 1999 to July 2000, Padalka trained for a space flight on a Soyuz-TM transport vehicle as an ISS contingency crew commander. From August 2000 to November 2001, he trained for a space flight as the Expedition 4 back-up crew commander.

==== Expedition 9 ====
In March 2002 Padalka was assigned as commander of the ISS Expedition 9 crew. Expedition 9 was launched from the Baikonur Cosmodrome, Kazakhstan aboard the Soyuz TMA-4 spacecraft, and docked with the ISS on 21 April 2004. Following a week of joint operations and handover briefings, they replaced the Expedition 8 crew who returned to Earth. In a six-month tour of duty aboard the station Padalka continued ISS science operations, maintained Station systems, and performed four spacewalks. The Expedition 9 mission concluded after undocking and landed back in Kazakhstan on 23 October 2004. In completing this mission, Padalka logged an additional 187 days, 21 minutes and 17 seconds in space, and 15 hours, 45 minutes and 22 seconds of EVA time.

==== Expedition 19/20 ====
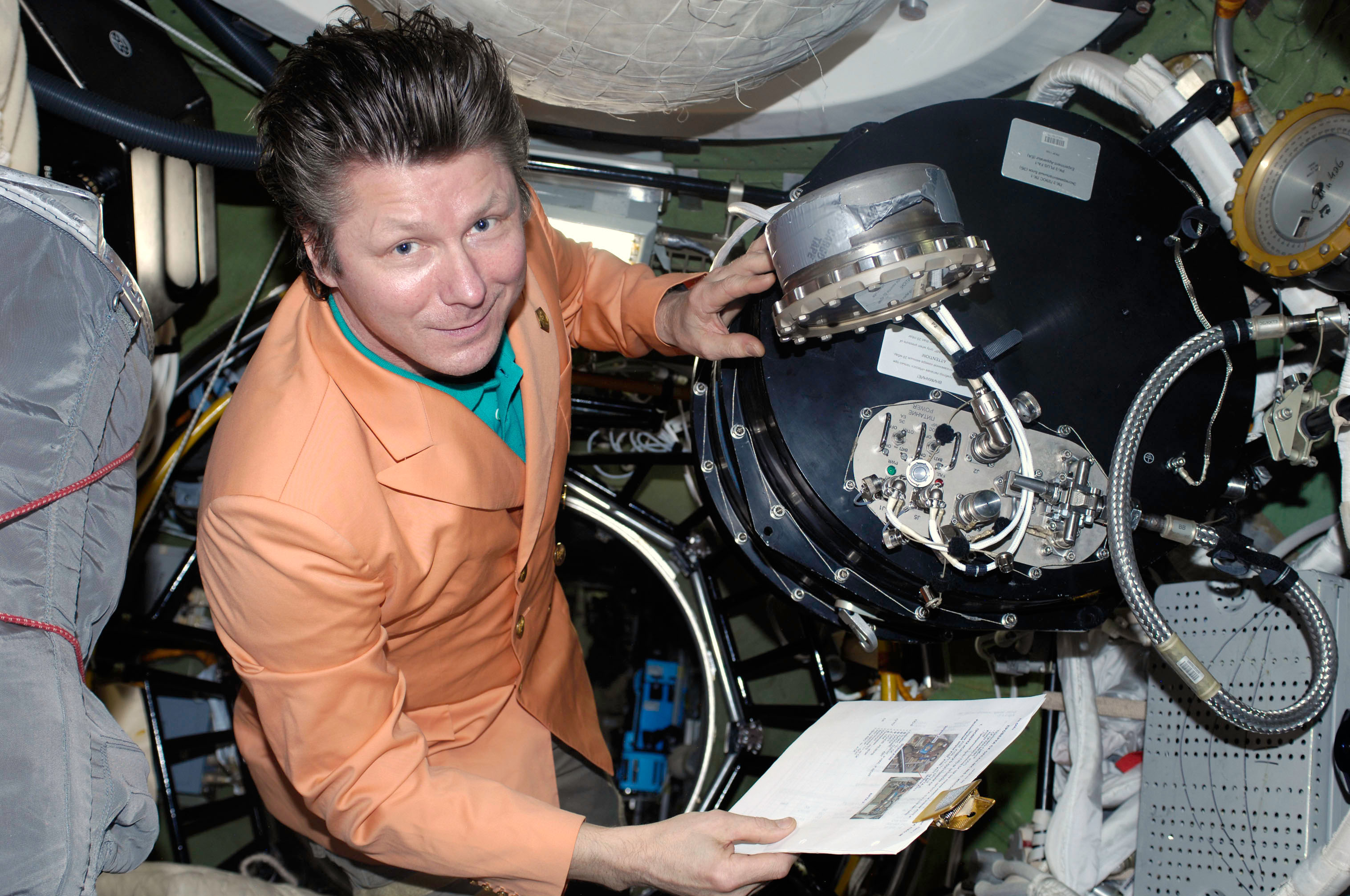
Expedition 20 commander Gennady Padalka inside the Pirs Docking Compartment of the Space Station with the PK-3 Plus laboratory.

Padalka returned to the ISS in 2009 to serve as commander of Expeditions 19 and 20. He commanded the Soyuz TMA-14 spacecraft which was launched from Baikonur on 26 March 2009 and docked with the ISS two days later. Padalka also commanded the first six-person space station crew (Expedition 20), returning to Earth on 11 October 2009.

==== Expedition 31/32 ====
In May 2012 Padalka returned to the ISS for a third time. He served as a flight engineer as part of Expedition 31 before graduating to command Expedition 32.

He launched to the ISS aboard Soyuz TMA-04M on 15 May 2012, along with fellow crew members Sergei Revin and Joseph Acaba and arrived at the space station on 17 May at 4:36 UTC. He, along with Revin and Acaba, returned to Earth on 17 September 2012.

==== Expedition 43/44 ====
Padalka returned to the ISS aboard Soyuz TMA-16M during Expedition 43 and Expedition 44, along with Mikhail Korniyenko and Scott Kelly. He landed on Soyuz TMA-16M on 12 September 2015. Padalka set the record for most time in space of anyone in history that stayed until Oleg Kononenko broke this record on February 4, 2024 at 07:30:08 UTC and is currently at 2nd position.

=== Retirement ===
In April 2017, it was announced that Padalka had filed his resignation from the Roscosmos cosmonaut corps. He explained his decision by the fact that he has only a small chance to join any space mission in the near future. "I had to resign. I am tired of doing nothing. There are no prospects that I will fly [to the International Space Station (ISS)]", he told TASS, explaining his decision.

=== Spacewalks ===
On 15 September 1998, Padalka performed the first spacewalk of his career during a stay aboard Mir along with Sergei Avdeyev. After donning spacesuits, the PKhO compartment of the Mir Core Module was depressurized and the spacewalkers entered the dead Spektr module at 20:00 GMT. The crew reconnected some cables for the solar panel steering mechanism and closed the hatch a half hour later. The PKhO was then repressurized after a spacewalk which lasted 30 minutes.

On 10 November 1998, Padalka and Avdeyev again ventured out into space. The two made the EVA from the Kvant-2 airlock on Mir. The starting time of the spacewalk was at 19:24 GMT. The two spacewalking cosmonauts installed a meteoroid detector in for the upcoming Leonid shower, and hand-launched the Sputnik-41 amateur-radio mini-satellite. The spacewalk concluded at 01:18 GMT on 11 November, clocking a total time of 5 hours and 54 minutes.

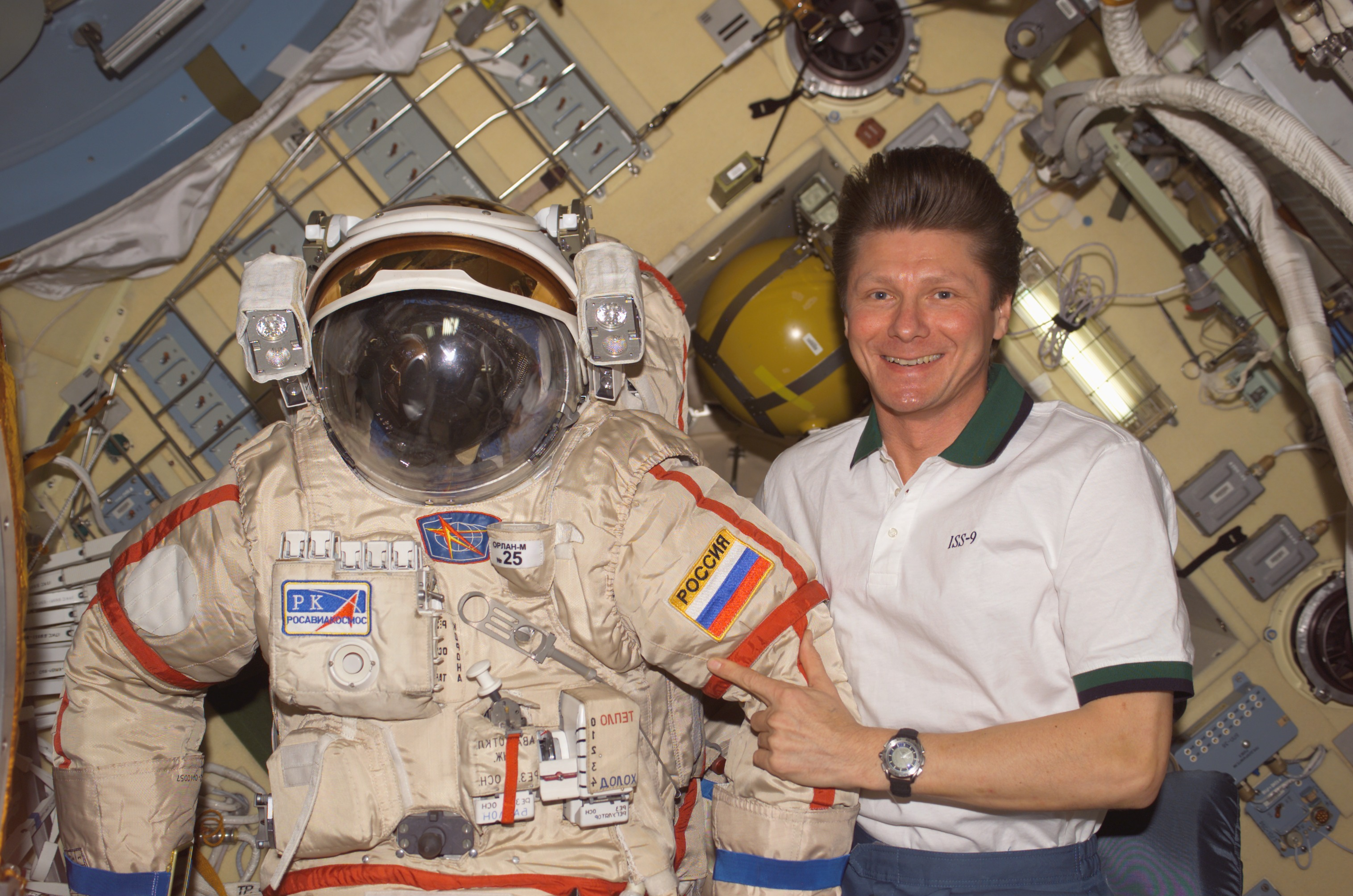
Padalka with his Orlan spacesuit in the Pirs Docking Compartment.

Padalka's third spacewalk was performed on 24 June 2004 from the ISS's Pirs Docking Compartment. The spacewalk was cut short due to a spacesuit malfunction of his fellow spacewalking partner, NASA astronaut Michael Fincke. After Fincke egressed within minutes, flight controllers noticed a decrease in pressure in his primary oxygen tank. Although the spacewalk was planned for six hours, as a result of the problems, it only lasted 14 minutes.

On 30 June 2004, Padalka performed his fourth spacewalk along with astronaut Michael Fincke. The duo successfully repaired a faulty circuit breaker on the space station an hour ahead of schedule. During their repair job, the two spacewalkers replaced a failed device called a remote power control module (RPCM) that had cut off power to its gyroscope. The spacewalk lasted 5 hours and 40 minutes.

On 3 August 2004, Gennady Padalka and Mike Fincke again left the space station to install communications gear and replace space exposure experiments on the outside of the Zvezda Service Module. The spacewalk was conducted from the Pirs Docking Compartment airlock and commenced when Padalka and Fincke opened the outer hatch of the airlock at 6:58 GMT. During the spacewalk, the two spacewalkers removed six obsolete laser reflectors used for docking and replaced four of them with newer versions. The crew also installed two antennas to allow the Automated Transfer Vehicle (ATV) to communicate with the space station and removed a cable from a faulty television camera. The 4 hour 20 minute excursion out of the ISS marked Padalka's fifth career spacewalk.

Padalka completed his sixth career spacewalk on 3 September 2004 when he and Mike Fincke ventured out into space. The spacewalk took place outside the Zvezda module. Padalka and Fincke began the spacewalk at 16:43 GMT, after emerging from the Pirs airlock. On the Zarya module, the two spacewalkers replaced a pump control panel that measures the module's coolant levels. They also installed three communications antennas at its aft end of the Zvezda module. The spacewalk lasted 5 hours and 21 minutes.

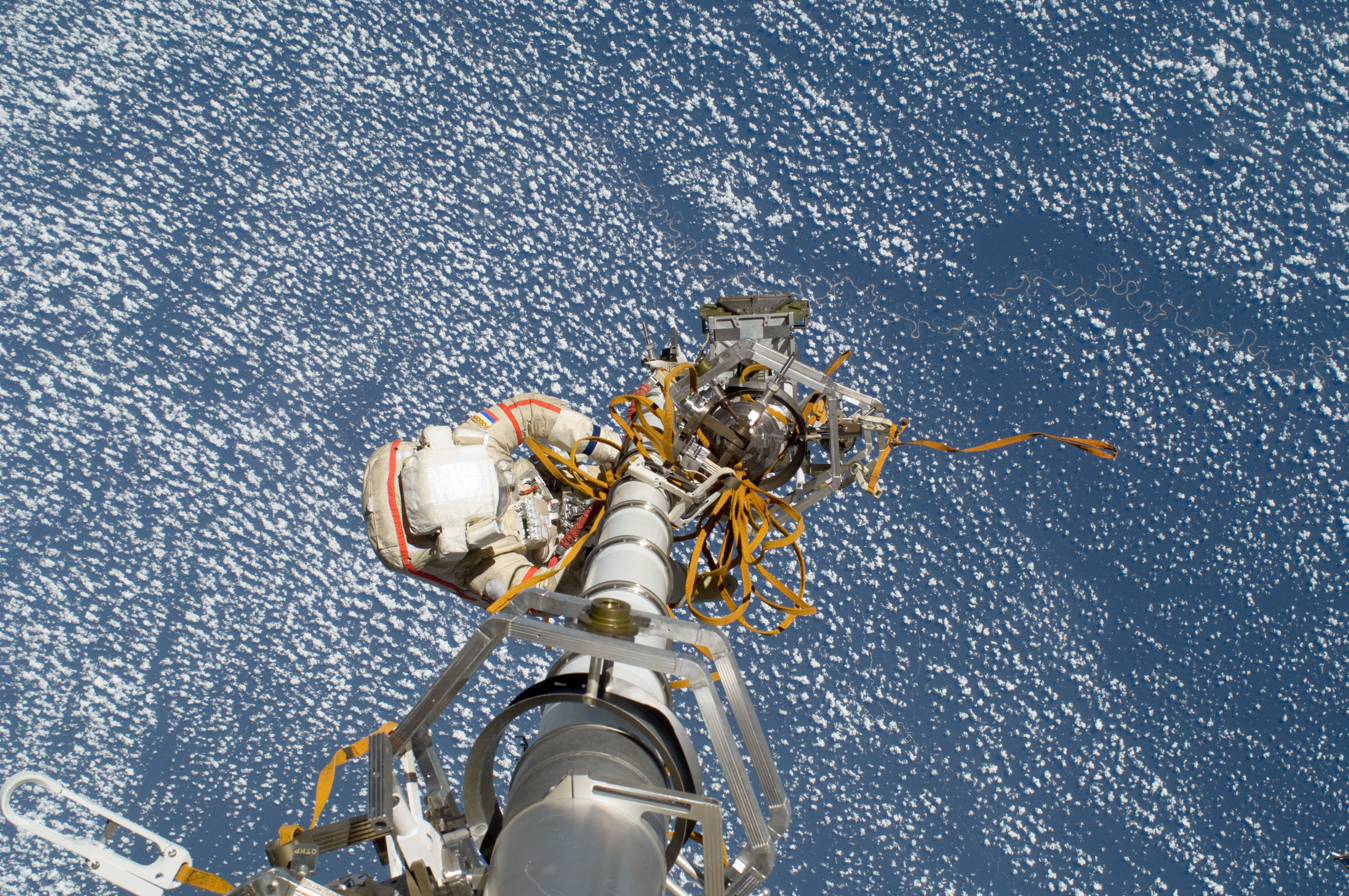
Gennady Padalka participates in a spacewalk to move the Strela-2 cargo boom from the Pirs docking compartment to the Zarya module in August 2012.

Padalka completed his seventh career spacewalk on 5 June 2009. He and NASA astronaut Michael Barratt egressed outside the ISS beginning at 7:52 UTC to install docking system antennas and cabling to accommodate the Mini Research Module 2 (MRM-2). The spacewalk began at an hour behind schedule because of higher than expected carbon-dioxide levels in the spacesuits. The spacewalk ended when the two crew members returned to the Pirs Docking Compartment airlock at 12:46 GMT. The spacewalk lasted 4 hours and 54 minutes.

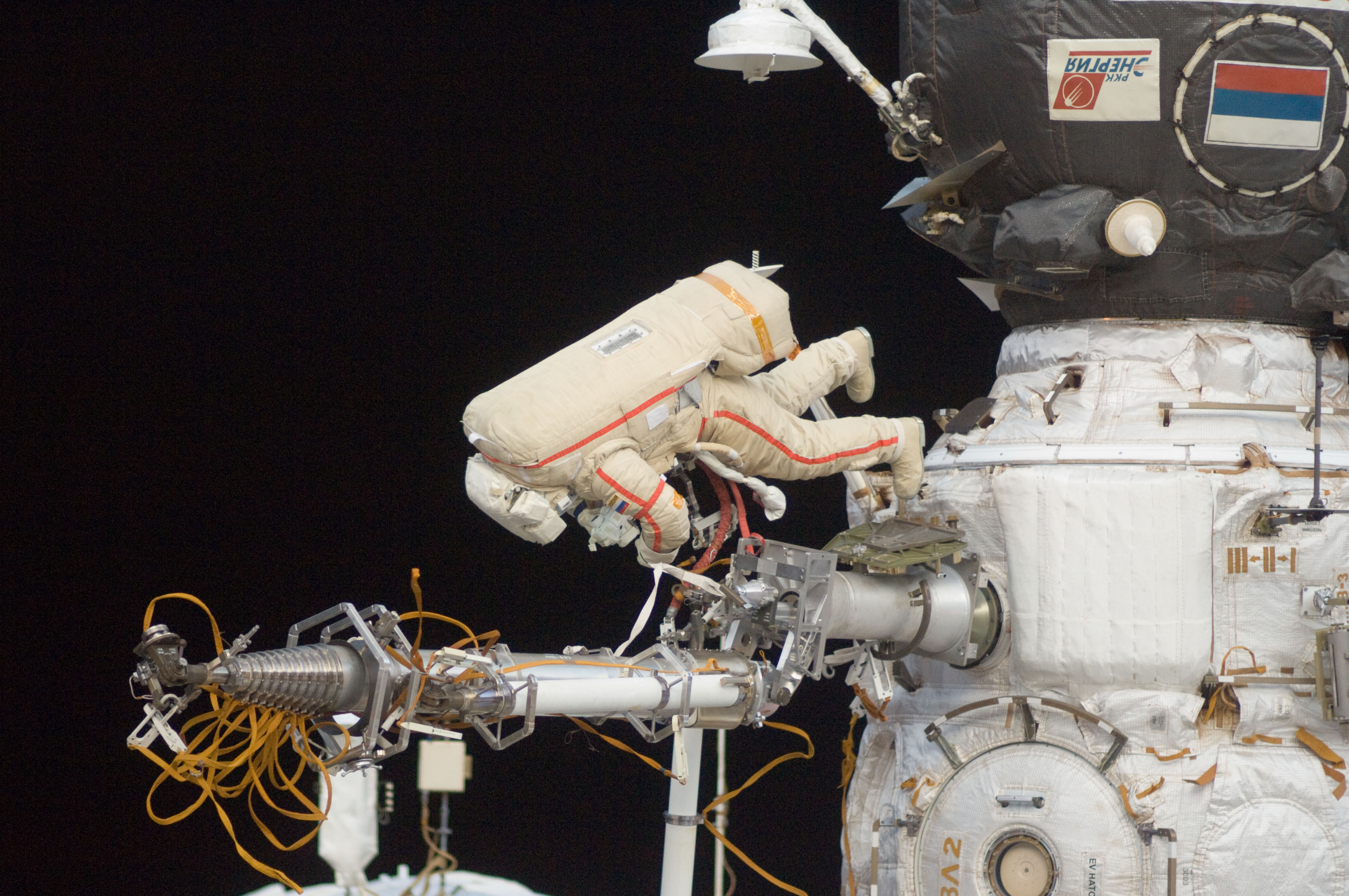
Gennady Padalka, Expedition 32 commander participates in a session of EVA on 20 August 2012.

On 10 June 2009, Gennady Padalka and Michael Barratt entered the transfer compartment in the Zvezda module. The "internal spacewalk" began 10 minutes behind schedule because of initial problems with pressure inside the airlock, which did not fall as fast as expected. While they were not in open space outside the ISS, Padalka and Barratt had to wear space suits in the depressurized compartment. During the 12 minute spacewalk the two crew members moved a docking mechanism to accommodate the MRM-2. The event marked the eighth career spacewalk for Padalka.

On 20 August 2012, Padalka, together with cosmonaut Yuri Malenchenko, participated in his ninth career spacewalk. Tasks assigned to the two cosmonauts included hardware relocations, installations, retrievals, and deployments. For the spacewalk, Malenchenko donned an Orlan spacesuit with the blue stripe. The duration of the spacewalk was 5 hours and 51 minutes. The spacewalk was delayed for about an hour due to a small leak between International Space Station modules. The spacewalk started from the Pirs Docking Compartment Module at 15:37 GMT. The first task for Padalka and Malenchenko was to relocate the Strela-2 boom from the Pirs module to the forward end of the Zarya module. The relocation was needed since Pirs module was to be detached from the Space Station for the arrival of the new Multi-purpose Laboratory Module (MLM) Nauka, both of which occurred in 2021. The next task completed by Padalka and Malenchenko was to deploy a 21-inch diameter spherical satellite. The two cosmonauts also retrieved five debris shields from the Pirs Module, prior to installing them on the Zvezda Module. They also completed several get-ahead tasks (since they both opted not to take rests during the night passes) as the duo were about an hour ahead of the timeline. They retrieved an external experiment called Biorisk from the Pirs Module for return to Earth, and for added stability installed two structural support struts between the Pirs Module and the EVA ladder. Padalka and Malenchenko then both ingressed the Pirs Module, prior to closing the hatch and beginning the re-pressurisation procedure, to end a successful spacewalk.

== See also ==
- List of Heroes of the Russian Federation

Preceded by Michael Foale	ISS Expedition Commander; 19 April to 24 November 2004	Succeeded by Leroy Chiao
Preceded by Michael Fincke	ISS Expedition Commander; 8 April to 30 October 2009	Succeeded by Frank De Winne
Preceded by Oleg Kononenko	ISS Expedition Commander; 1 July to 16 September 2012	Succeeded by Sunita Williams
Preceded by Terry W. Virts	ISS Expedition Commander; 11 June to 11 September 2015	Succeeded by Scott Kelly
