= PEGASE =

PEGASE is a design for a space observatory developed by France in the early 2000s. It combined formation flying with infrared telescopes operating as a double-aperture interferometer. Three free-flying satellites would operate together;a beam combiner and two siderostats. The baseline of the interferometer would be adjustable to between 50 and 500 meters. The goal of the mission is the study of Hot Jupiters ("pegasids"), brown dwarfs and the interior of protoplanetary disks. The design was developed by Centre National d'Études Spatiales and was studied for a launch as early as 2010–2012. However, the Phase-0 part of the study in 2005 suggested it would take 8 or 9 years to develop.

== See also ==
- List of proposed space observatories
