= Soyuz MS-31 =

Planned 2027 Russian crewed spaceflight to the ISS

- Names: ISS 77S
- Mission type: Crewed mission to ISS
- Operator: Roscosmos
- Website: en.roscosmos.ru
- Mission duration: 240 days (planned)

Spacecraft properties
- Spacecraft type: Soyuz MS
- Manufacturer: Energia

Crew
- Crew size: 3
- Members: Oleg Kononenko; Alexander Grebenkin; TBA
- Callsign: Antares

Start of mission
- Launch date: November 2027 (planned)
- Rocket: Soyuz-2.1a
- Launch site: Baikonur Cosmodrome, Site 31
- Contractor: RKTs Progress

End of mission
- Landing date: July 2028 (planned)
- Landing site: Kazakh Steppe, Kazakhstan

Orbital parameters
- Reference system: Geocentric orbit
- Regime: Low Earth orbit
- Inclination: 51.66°

Docking with ISS
- Docking port: Prichal nadir
- Docking date: November 2027 (planned)
- Undocking date: July 2028 (planned)

Soyuz MS-31 is a planned Russian crewed Soyuz spaceflight to launch from Baikonur in November 2027 to the International Space Station.

== Crew ==
Prime crew
Position	Crew
Commander	Oleg Kononenko, Roscosmos; Expedition 76/77; Sixth spaceflight
Flight engineer	Alexander Grebenkin, Roscosmos; Expedition 76/77; Second spaceflight
Flight engineer	TBA

Backup crew
Position	Crew
Commander	Nikolai Chub, Roscosmos
Flight engineer	Aleksandr Gorbunov, Roscosmos
Flight engineer	TBA
