= Léopold Eyharts =

French astronaut, engineer and brigadier general (born 1957)

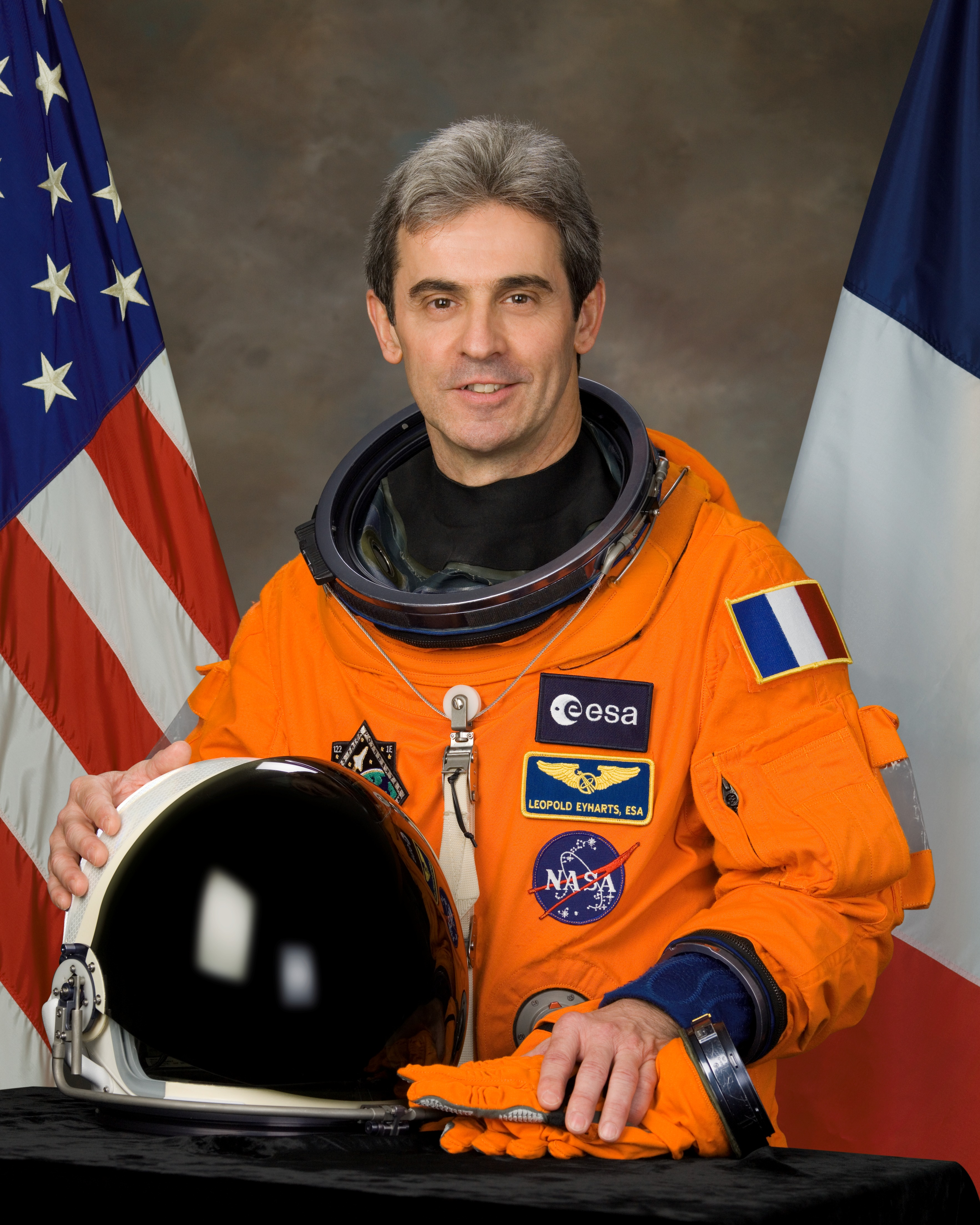
- Eyharts in 2007
- Born: 28 April 1957 (age 69); Biarritz, Pyrénées-Atlantiques, France
- Occupation: Test pilot
- Space career

CNES/ESA astronaut
- Status: Retired
- Rank: Brigadier General, French Air Force
- Time in space: 68d 21h 31min
- Selection: 1990 CNES Group 3, 1998 ESA Group
- Missions: Soyuz TM-27/26, STS-122/123 (Expedition 16)
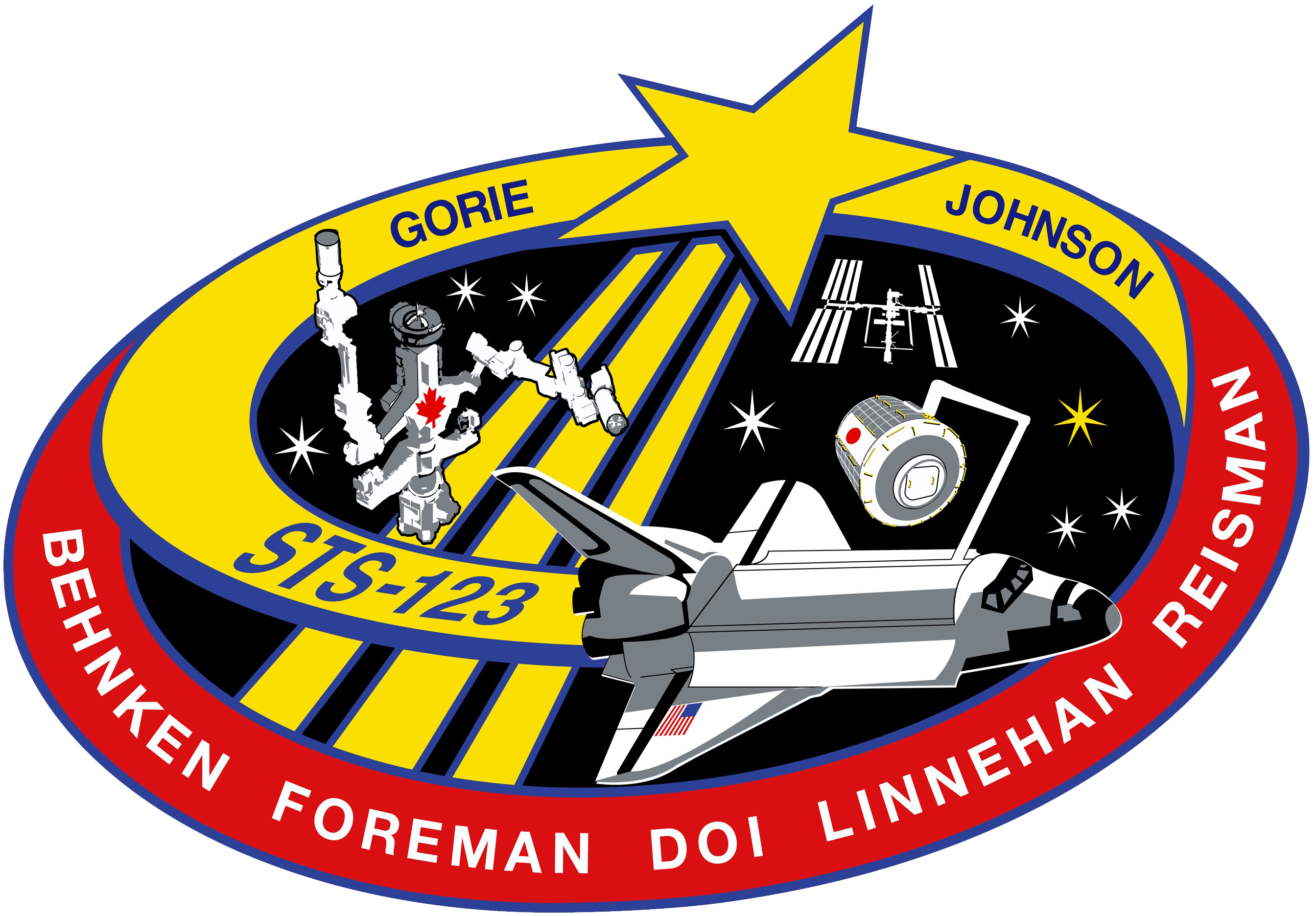
- Mission insignia

Léopold "Leo" Eyharts (born 28 April 1957) is a French Brigadier General in the French Air Force, an engineer and ESA astronaut. He has flown to space two times as part of a Mir expedition and an International Space Station expedition.

Eyharts was born on 28 April 1957 in Biarritz, Basque Country, France. He graduated as an engineer from the French Air Force Academy of Salon-de-Provence in 1979, and graduated from the École du personnel navigant d'essais et de réception (EPNER) French test pilot school in Istres in 1988.

He launched on board Space Shuttle mission STS-122 to the International Space Station on 7 February 2008, where he joined Expedition 16. He participated in the installation and configuration of the Columbus European laboratory module. He returned to Earth aboard mission STS-123 in March 2008.

== Awards and honors ==
- Chevalier of the Légion d'honneur
- Chevalier of the Ordre national du Mérite
- Médaille d'Outre-Mer
- Silver National Defence Medal
- Cavalier of the Order of Courage (Russia)
- Cavalier of the Order of Friendship (Russia)
- The medal "For merits in development of space" (12 April 2011) for his outstanding contribution to the development of international cooperation in crewed space flight
