= Yuri Baturin =

Russian cosmonaut and former politician (born 1949)

- Юрий Батурин
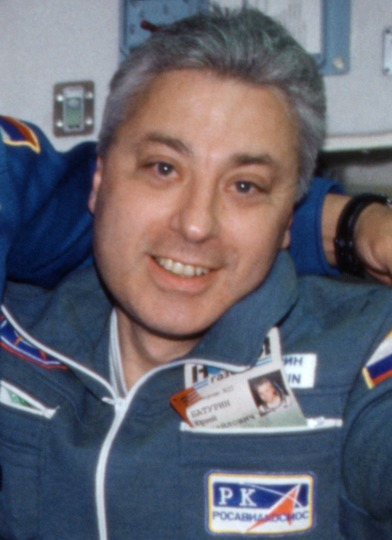
- Baturin in 2001
- Born: 12 June 1949 (age 77); Moscow, Soviet Union
- Awards: Hero of the Russian Federation
- Space career

Cosmonaut
- Status: Retired
- Time in space: 19d 17h 44m
- Selection: 1997
- Missions: Mir EP-4 (Soyuz TM-28 / Soyuz TM-27), ISS EP-1 (Soyuz TM-32 / Soyuz TM-31)
- Yuri Baturin's voice from the Echo of Moscow program, 6 April 2006

Yuri Mikhailovich Baturin (Russian: Юрий Михайлович Батурин; born 12 June 1949, in Moscow) is a Russian cosmonaut and former politician. He has the federal state civilian service rank of 1st class Active State Councillor of the Russian Federation.

Baturin graduated from the Moscow Institute of Physics and Technology in 1973, and is the former assistant to the president on National Security and secretary of the Defense Council (1996–1998). He is also an author in constitutional law.

Baturin was also a cosmonaut who flew on two missions. His first spaceflight, sometimes called Mir EP-4, was launched with the spacecraft Soyuz TM-28 13 August 1998, and landed with Soyuz TM-27. He was a research cosmonaut for this mission, which lasted for 11 days 19 hours 39 minutes. His second spaceflight was ISS EP-1, which was launched with the spacecraft Soyuz TM-32 on April 28, 2001, and landed with Soyuz TM-31. This mission was notable as carrying the first paying space tourist, Dennis Tito. For this mission, Baturin was designated a flight engineer; the mission lasted for 7 days 22 hours and 4 minutes.

He married Svetlana Veniaminovna Polubinskaya; they had a daughter.

== See also ==
- List of Heroes of the Russian Federation
