= Sergey Avdeev =

Russian engineer and cosmonaut (born 1956)

Sergei Avdeyev
- Сергей Авдеев
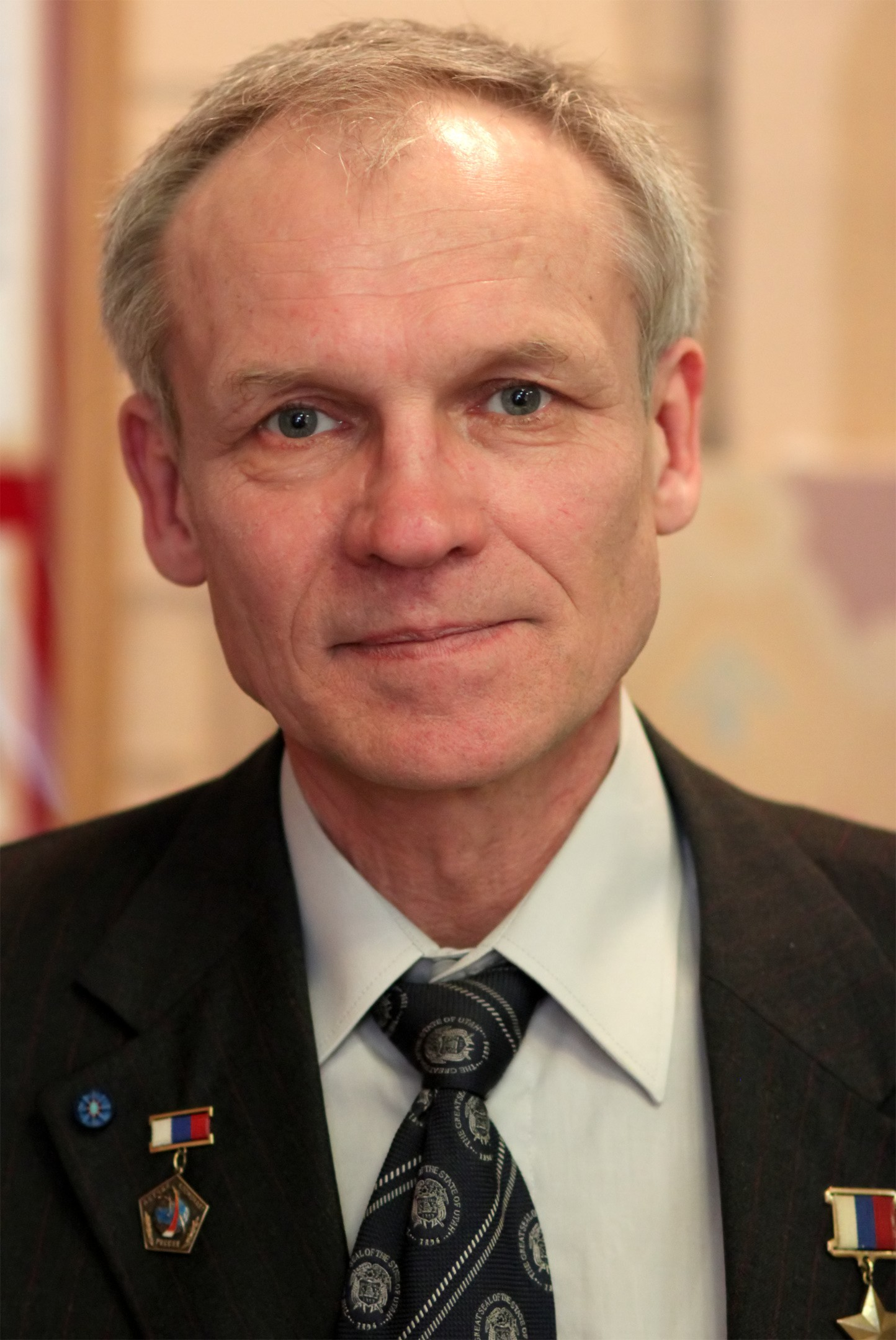
- Born: 1 January 1956 (age 70); Chapayevsk, Russian SFSR, Soviet Union
- Occupation: Engineer
- Awards: Hero of the Russian Federation
- Space career

Roscosmos cosmonaut
- Status: Retired
- Time in space: 747d 14h 14m
- Selection: 1987
- Total EVAs: 10 (4 during Mir EO-12, 2 during Mir EO-20, 2 during Mir EO-26, 2 during Mir EO-27)
- Total EVA time: 42h, 07m
- Missions: Soyuz TM-15 (Mir EO-12), Soyuz TM-22 (Mir EO-20), Soyuz TM-28/Soyuz TM-29 (Mir EO-26/27)
- Retired: February 14, 2003

Sergei Vasilyevich Avdeyev (Сергей Васильевич Авдеев; born 1 January 1956) is a former Russian engineer and cosmonaut.

Avdeyev was born in Chapayevsk, Samara Oblast (formerly Kuybyshev Oblast), Russian SFSR. He graduated from Moscow Engineering Physics Institute in 1979 as an engineer-physicist . From 1979 to 1987 he worked as an engineer for NPO Energiya. He was selected as a cosmonaut as part of the Energia Engineer Group 9 on 26 March 1987. His basic cosmonaut training was from December 1987 through to July 1989. He retired as a cosmonaut on 14 February 2003.

Avdeyev at one point held the record for cumulative time spent in space with 747.59 days in Earth orbit, accumulated through three tours of duty aboard the Mir Space Station. He has orbited the Earth 11,968 times traveling about 515,000,000 kilometers. In August 2005, this record was taken by another cosmonaut, Sergei K. Krikalev; it has since been surpassed by other cosmonauts, the current record holder being Oleg Kononenko since February 2024.

Avdeyev is married with two children. He is an amateur radio operator, and his call sign is RV3DW.

== Time dilation record ==
For a long time, Avdeyev held the record for time dilation experienced by a human being. In his 747 days aboard Mir, cumulative across three missions, he went approximately 27,360 km/h and thus aged roughly 0.02 seconds (20 milliseconds) slower from an Earthbound person's perspective, which is considerably more than any other human being, except Sergei Krikalev. This is due to the special relativistic effect of time dilation and is not properly thought of as time travelling as described by mainstream culture. A common misconception is that the Apollo program astronauts hold the record—they did go faster than Avdeyev, but they were only in space for a few days.

== Spaceflights ==
- Soyuz TM-15 – 27 July 1992 to 1 February 1993 – 188 days, 21 hours, 41 minutes, 15 seconds
- Soyuz TM-22 – 3 September 1995 to 29 February 1996 – 179 days, 1 hour, 41 minutes, 45 seconds
- Soyuz TM-28 and Soyuz TM-29 – 13 August 1998 to 28 August 1999 – 379 days, 14 hours, 51 minutes, 9 seconds

== Spacewalks (42 hours, 2 minutes) ==
- 1. MIR EO-12 – 3 September 1992 – 3 hours, 56 minutes
- 2. MIR EO-12 – 7 September 1992 – 5 hours, 8 minutes
- 3. MIR EO-12 – 11 September 1992 – 5 hours, 44 minutes
- 4. MIR EO-12 – 15 September 1992 – 3 hours, 33 minutes
- 5. MIR EO-20 – 20 October 1995 – 5 hours, 11 minutes
- 6. MIR EO-20 – 8 December 1995 – 0 hours, 37 minutes
- 7. MIR EO-26 – 15 September 1998 – 0 hours, 30 minutes
- 8. MIR EO-26 – 17 November 1998 – 5 hours, 54 minutes
- 9. MIR EO-27 – 23 July 1999 – 6 hours, 7 minutes
- 10. MIR EO-27 – 28 July 1999 – 5 hours, 22 minutes

== Honours and awards ==
- Hero of the Russian Federation (February 5, 1993) - for the successful implementation of spaceflight on the orbital scientific research complex Mir and displaying courage and heroism
- Order of Merit for the Fatherland;
  - 2nd class (22 November 1999) - for courage and heroism displayed during prolonged space flight on the orbital scientific research complex Mir
  - 3rd class (April 1, 1996) - for the successful implementation of spaceflight on the orbital scientific research complex Mir and displaying courage and heroism
- Medal "For Merit in Space Exploration" (April 12, 2011) - for the great achievements in the field of research, development and use of outer space, many years of diligent work, public activities
- Chevalier of the Legion of Honour (France, March 1999)
- Pilot-Cosmonaut of the Russian Federation (February 5, 1993)
- Honorary Citizen of Chapayevsk, Samara Oblast (2004)

== See also ==
- List of Heroes of the Russian Federation
- Spaceflight records
