= Soyuz TM-27 =

1998 Russian crewed spaceflight to Mir

- Operator: Rosaviakosmos
- COSPAR ID: 1998-004A
- SATCAT no.: 25146
- Mission duration: 207 days, 12 hours, 51 minutes, 2 seconds
- Orbits completed: 3,284

Spacecraft properties
- Spacecraft type: Soyuz-TM
- Manufacturer: RKK Energia
- Launch mass: 7,150 kilograms (15,760 lb)

Crew
- Crew size: 3
- Members: Talgat Musabayev; Nikolai Budarin
- Launching: Léopold Eyharts
- Landing: Yuri Baturin
- Callsign: Криста́лл (Kristall)

Start of mission
- Launch date: January 29, 1998, 16:33:42 UTC
- Rocket: Soyuz-U

End of mission
- Landing date: August 25, 1998, 05:24:44 UTC
- Landing site: 47.96944°N 69.63056°E

Orbital parameters
- Reference system: Geocentric
- Regime: Low Earth
- Perigee altitude: 382 kilometres (237 mi)
- Apogee altitude: 390 kilometres (240 mi)
- Inclination: 51.6 degrees

Docking with Mir
- Soyuz programme (Crewed missions)

Soyuz TM-27 was a Russian spaceflight that ferried cosmonauts and supplies to the Russian space station Mir. It was the 33rd expedition to Mir. It was launched by a Soyuz-U rocket from Baikonur Cosmodrome on January 29, 1998. The main mission was to exchange one crew member, carry out French mission PEGASE, and conduct routine science experiments.

TM-27 docked with Mir. The crew repaired the Spektr solar panel and installed a new VDU station orientation system.

== Crew ==
Position	Launching crew	Landing crew
Commander	(Russia) Talgat Musabayev; Second spaceflight	
Flight Engineer	(Russia) Nikolai Budarin; Second spaceflight	
Research Cosmonaut	(France) Léopold Eyharts; First spaceflight	(Russia) Yuri Baturin; First spaceflight

== Mission accomplishments ==
- Docked with Mir
- Exchange part of crew
- Carried out French mission PEGASE
- Conducted routine science experiments

== EVA schedule ==
- 03.03.1998 aborted due to faulty hatch
- 01.04.1998 (6h 40m)
- 06.04.1998 (4h 23m)
- 11.04.1998 (6h 25m)
- 17.04.1998 (6h 32m)
- 22.04.1998 (6h 21m)
- Over the course of these 5 walks, the cosmonauts repaired the Spektr solar panel and installed a new VDU station orientation system.

== Mission notes ==
Both cosmonauts and astronaut Andy Thomas (arrived on STS-89) became the 25th resident crew. Eyharts landed on 19.02.1998 with Soyuz TM-26-spacecraft. Included astronaut from France.
