= Soyuz TM-26 =

1997 Russian crewed spaceflight to Mir

- Operator: Rosaviakosmos
- COSPAR ID: 1997-038A
- SATCAT no.: 24886
- Mission duration: 197 days, 17 hours, 34 minutes, 36 seconds
- Orbits completed: ~3,220

Spacecraft properties
- Spacecraft type: Soyuz-TM
- Manufacturer: RKK Energia
- Launch mass: 7,150 kilograms (15,760 lb)

Crew
- Crew size: 2 up 3 down
- Members: Anatoly Solovyev; Pavel Vinogradov
- Landing: Léopold Eyharts
- Callsign: Родни́к (Rodnik - Spring)

Start of mission
- Launch date: August 5, 1997, 15:35:54 UTC
- Rocket: Soyuz-U

End of mission
- Landing date: February 19, 1998, 09:10:30 UTC
- Landing site: 50.18°N 67.50°E

Orbital parameters
- Reference system: Geocentric
- Regime: Low Earth
- Perigee altitude: 193 kilometres (120 mi)
- Apogee altitude: 249 kilometres (155 mi)
- Inclination: 51.6 degrees

Docking with Mir
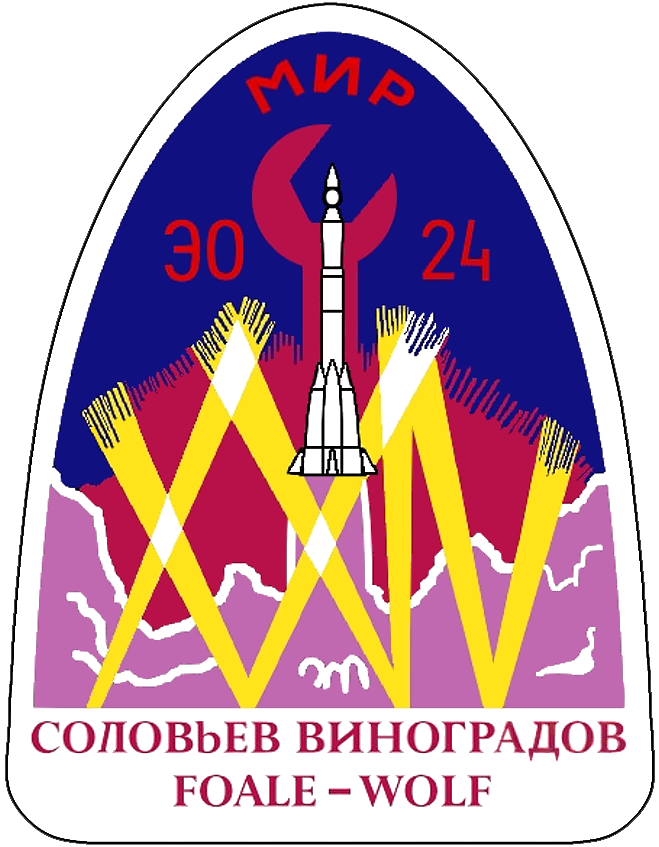
- Soyuz programme (Crewed missions)

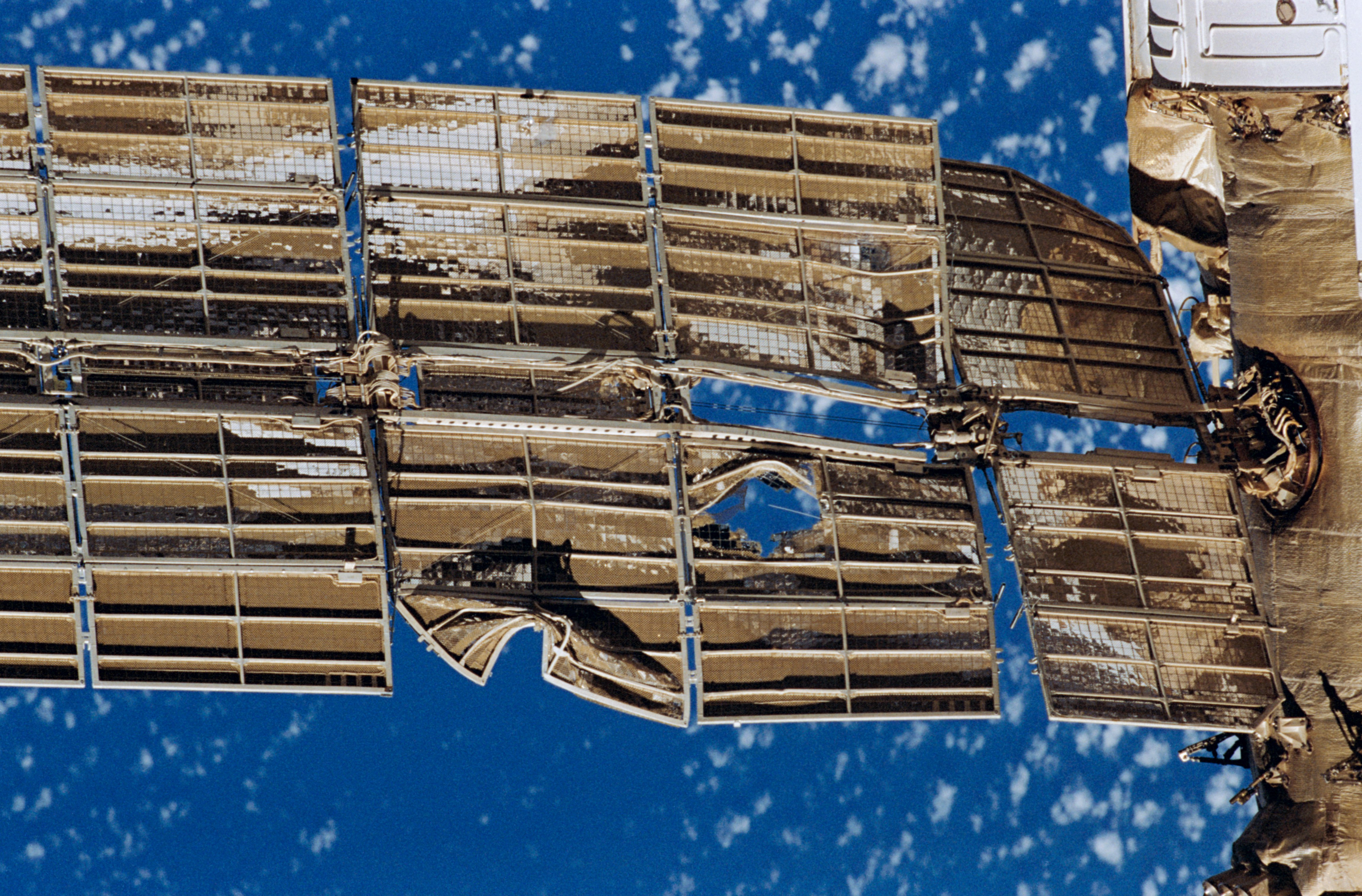
Damaged solar array of the Spektr module after Progress M-34 freighter colliding with the Mir space station on June 25, 1997

Soyuz TM-26 was a Russian spaceflight that ferried cosmonauts and supplies to Mir. It was the 32nd expedition to Mir. It was launched by a Soyuz-U rocket from Baikonur Cosmodrome on August 5, 1997. The main mission was to transport two specially-trained cosmonauts to repair or salvage the troubled space station.

TM-26 docked with Mir on August 7 by manual control. The crew repaired the power cable and harness/connectors in the severely damaged Spektr module and restored much of the lost power; they also repaired and replaced the oxygen generators in Mir. The hole(s) in that module that caused total depressurization of the module could not be located during their spacewalk inside that module.

During the flight a television advertisement starring Vasily Tsibliyev was filmed on the station. The ad, for Tnuva's brand of UHT milk, was the first ad to be filmed in space.

== Crew ==
Position	Launching crew	Landing crew
Commander	(Russia) Anatoly Solovyev; Fifth and last spaceflight	
Flight Engineer	(Russia) Pavel Vinogradov; First spaceflight	
Research Cosmonaut	None	(France) Léopold Eyharts; First spaceflight
