= Soyuz TM-15 =

1992 Russian crewed spaceflight to Mir

- Operator: Rosaviakosmos
- COSPAR ID: 1992-046A
- SATCAT no.: 22054
- Mission duration: 188 days, 21 hours, 41 minutes, 15 seconds
- Orbits completed: ~3,070

Spacecraft properties
- Spacecraft: Soyuz 7K-STM No. 65
- Spacecraft type: Soyuz-TM
- Manufacturer: NPO Energia
- Launch mass: 7,150 kilograms (15,760 lb)

Crew
- Crew size: 3 up 2 down
- Members: Anatoly Solovyev; Sergei Avdeyev
- Launching: Michel Tognini
- Callsign: Rodnik (Spring)

Start of mission
- Launch date: July 27, 1992, 06:08:42 UTC
- Rocket: Soyuz-U2

End of mission
- Landing date: February 1, 1993, 03:49:57 UTC
- Landing site: near Dzhezkazgan

Orbital parameters
- Reference system: Geocentric
- Regime: Low Earth
- Perigee altitude: 196 kilometres (122 mi)
- Apogee altitude: 216 kilometres (134 mi)
- Inclination: 51.6 degrees

Docking with Mir
- Docking date: July 29, 1992, 07:49:05 UTC
- Undocking date: February 1, 1993, 00:19:47 UTC
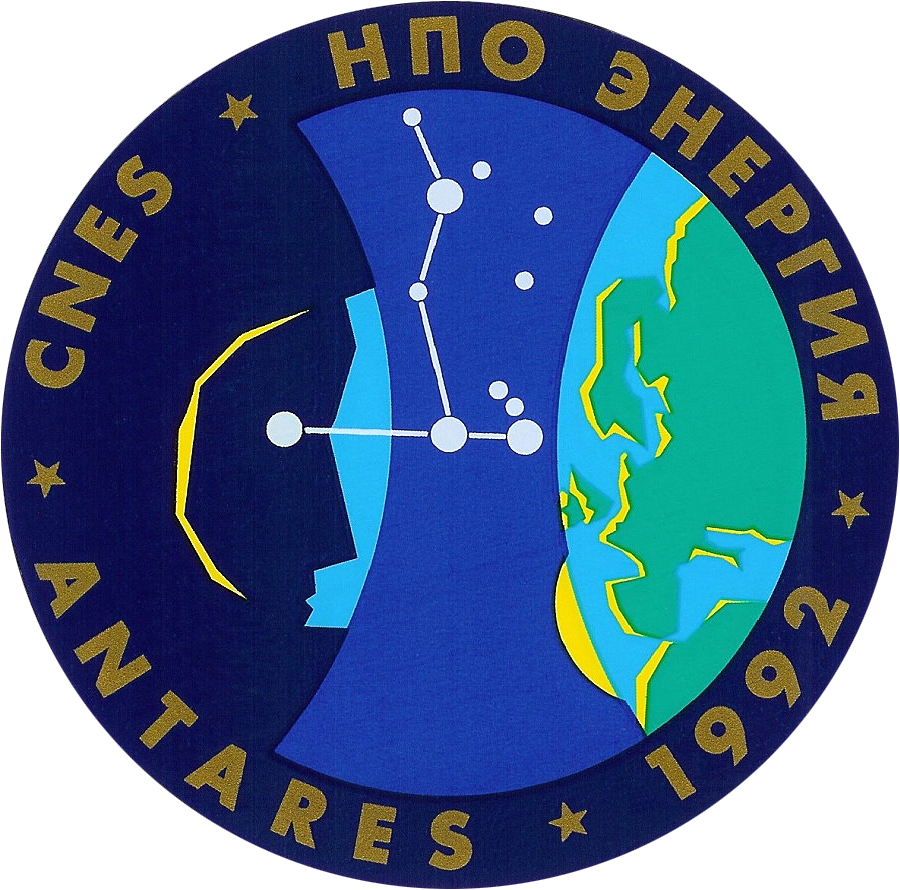
- Soyuz programme (Crewed missions)

Soyuz TM-15 was the 15th expedition to the Mir space station. It included spationaut Michel Tognini from France. The Soyuz TM-15 flight set what was then a new Soyuz spacecraft on orbit endurance record.

== Crew ==
Position	Launching crew	Landing crew
Commander	Anatoly Solovyev; Third spaceflight	
Flight engineer	Sergei Avdeyev; First spaceflight	
Research cosmonaut	Michel Tognini, CNES; First spaceflight	None

== Mission highlights ==
Michel Tognini, passenger aboard Soyuz- TM 15, was the third Frenchman to visit a space station. He conducted ten experiments using 300 kg of equipment delivered by Progress-M flights. Tognini spent 2 weeks in space as part of ongoing space cooperation between Russia and France.
