= Jean-Pierre Haigneré =

French test pilot and astronaut (born 1948)

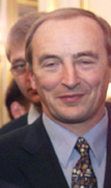
- Born: 19 May 1948 (age 78); Paris, France
- Occupation: Test Pilot
- Space career

CNES Spationaut
- Status: Retired
- Rank: Brigadier General, French Air Force
- Time in space: 209d 12h 25min
- Selection: 1985 CNES Group 2, 1998 ESA Group
- Total EVAs: 1 (during Mir EO-27)
- Total EVA time: 6h, 19m
- Mission: Soyuz TM-17/Soyuz TM-16 (Mir Altair), Soyuz TM-29 (Mir Perseus (EO-27))

Jean-Pierre Haigneré (born 19 May 1948) is a French Air Force officer and a former CNES spationaut.

Jean-Pierre Haigneré was born in Paris, France, and joined the French Air Force, where he trained as a test pilot.

He flew on two missions to the Mir space station in 1993 and 1999. The Mir Perseus (Mir EO-27) long-duration mission (186 days) in 1999 also included an EVA. In addition to his duties at the European Space Agency, Jean-Pierre Haigneré is also involved in a European space tourism initiative, the Astronaute Club Européen (ACE), which he co-founded with Alain Dupas and Laurent Gathier. He is credited with taking the first picture of the shadow of a Solar eclipse from space. He took this during the Mir Perseus (Mir EO-27) mission.

External image
- image icon

== Family ==
He is married to former French astronaut Claudie Haigneré. The asteroid 135268 Haigneré is named in their combined honour.
