= Soyuz TM-29 =

1999 Russian crewed spaceflight to Mir

- Operator: Rosaviakosmos
- COSPAR ID: 1999-007A
- SATCAT no.: 25632
- Mission duration: 188 days, 20 hours, 16 minutes, 19 seconds
- Orbits completed: ~3,070

Spacecraft properties
- Spacecraft type: Soyuz-TM
- Manufacturer: RKK Energia
- Launch mass: 7,150 kilograms (15,760 lb)

Crew
- Crew size: 3
- Members: Viktor Afanasyev; Jean-Pierre Haigneré
- Launching: Ivan Bella
- Landing: Sergei Avdeyev
- Callsign: Дербе́нт (Derbent)

Start of mission
- Launch date: February 20, 1999, 04:18:01 UTC
- Rocket: Soyuz-U

End of mission
- Landing date: August 28, 1999, 00:34:20 UTC
- Landing site: 70 kilometres (43 mi) NE of Arkalyk

Orbital parameters
- Reference system: Geocentric
- Regime: Low Earth
- Perigee altitude: 188 kilometres (117 mi)
- Apogee altitude: 273 kilometres (170 mi)
- Inclination: 51.6 degrees
- Period: 88.6 minutes

Docking with Mir
- Soyuz programme (Crewed missions)

Soyuz TM-29 was a Russian Soyuz spaceflight launched from the Baikonur Cosmodrome aboard a Soyuz 11A511U rocket. It docked with Mir on February 22, 1999 at 05:36 GMT with cosmonauts Viktor Afanasyev of Russia, Jean-Pierre Haigneré of France, and Ivan Bella of Slovakia aboard. Since two crew seats had been sold (to Slovakia and France), Afanasyev was the only Russian cosmonaut aboard. This meant that Russian engineer Avdeyev already aboard Mir would have to accept a double-length assignment. After the February 27 departure of EO-26 crew commander Padalka and cosmonaut Bella aboard Soyuz TM-28, the new EO-27 Mir crew consisted of Afanasyev as Commander, Avdeyev as Engineer and French cosmonaut Haigneré.

== Crew ==
| Position | Launching crew | Landing crew |
|---|---|---|
| Commander | (Russia) Viktor Afanasyev; Third spaceflight | |
| Flight Engineer | (France) Jean-Pierre Haigneré; Second and last spaceflight | |
| Research Cosmonaut/Flight Engineer | (Slovakia) Ivan Bella; Only spaceflight | (Russia) Sergei Avdeyev; Third and last spaceflight |

== Mission highlights ==
38th expedition to Mir.
