= List of International Space Station expeditions =

Long-duration missions to the orbital lab

An expedition to the International Space Station (ISS) is a permanent crew rotation occupying the space station and using it for space research and testing. An expedition can last up to six months and may include between two and seven crew members.

Expeditions are numbered starting from one and sequentially increased with each expedition. Resupply mission crews and space tourists are excluded (see List of human spaceflights to the ISS for details). ISS commanders are listed in italics. "Duration" is the period of time between the crew's launch from Earth and their decoupling from the ISS.

== Completed expeditions ==
Exp.	Patch	Crew	Arrival (UTC)	Arrival Flight	Departure (UTC)	Departure Flight	Duration (days)
1		(Russia) Yuri Gidzenko (Russia) Sergei Krikalev (United States) William Shepherd	2 November 2000; 09:21	Soyuz TM-31	21 March 2001; 07:33	STS-102	141
2		(Russia) Yury Usachov (United States) James S. Voss (United States) Susan Helms	8 March 2001; 11:42	STS-102	22 August 2001; 19:24	STS-105	167.28
3		(United States) Frank L. Culbertson Jr. (Russia) Mikhail Tyurin (Russia) Vladimir Dezhurov	10 August 2001; 21:10	STS-105	17 December 2001; 17:56	STS-108	128.86
4		(Russia) Yury Onufriyenko (United States) Carl E. Walz (United States) Daniel W. Bursch	5 December 2001; 22:19	STS-108	19 June 2002; 09:57	STS-111	195.82
5		(Russia) Valery Korzun (United States) Peggy Whitson (Russia) Sergei Treshchov	5 June 2002; 21:22	STS-111	7 December 2002; 19:37	STS-113	184.93
6		(Russia) Nikolai Budarin (United States) Ken Bowersox (United States) Donald Pettit	24 November 2002; 00:49	STS-113	4 May 2003; 02:04	Soyuz TMA-1	161.05
7		(Russia) Yuri Malenchenko (United States) Ed Lu	26 April 2003; 03:53	Soyuz TMA-2	28 October 2003; 02:40	Soyuz TMA-2	184.93
8		(Russia) Aleksandr Kaleri (United States) Michael Foale	18 October 2003; 05:38	Soyuz TMA-3	30 April 2004; 00:11	Soyuz TMA-3	194.77
9		(Russia) Gennady Padalka (United States) Michael Fincke	19 April 2004; 03:19	Soyuz TMA-4	24 October 2004; 00:32	Soyuz TMA-4	185.66
10		(Russia) Salizhan Sharipov (United States) Leroy Chiao	16 October 2004; 04:16	Soyuz TMA-5	24 April 2005; 22:08	Soyuz TMA-5	192.79
11		(Russia) Sergei Krikalev (United States) John L. Phillips	15 April 2005; 00:46	Soyuz TMA-6	11 October 2005; 01:09	Soyuz TMA-6	179.02
12		(Russia) Valeri Tokarev (United States) William S. McArthur	1 October 2005; 03:54	Soyuz TMA-7	8 April 2006; 23:48	Soyuz TMA-7	189.01
13		(Russia) Pavel Vinogradov (United States) Jeffrey Williams	30 March 2006; 02:30	Soyuz TMA-8	28 September 2006; 01:13	Soyuz TMA-8	182.65
13		(Germany) Thomas Reiter	4 July 2006; 18:38	STS-121	Transferred to Expedition 14		
14		(Russia) Mikhail Tyurin (United States) Michael López-Alegría	18 September 2006; 04:09	Soyuz TMA-9	21 April 2007; 12:31	Soyuz TMA-9	215.35
14		(Germany) Thomas Reiter	Transferred from Expedition 13		21 December 2006; 22:32	STS-116	171.16
14		(United States) Sunita Williams	10 December 2006; 01:47	STS-116	Transferred to Expedition 15		
15		(Russia) Oleg Kotov (Russia) Fyodor Yurchikhin	7 April 2007; 17:31	Soyuz TMA-10	21 October 2007; 10:36	Soyuz TMA-10	196.71
15		(United States) Sunita Williams	Transferred from Expedition 14		22 June 2007; 19:49	STS-117	194.75
15		(United States) Clayton Anderson	8 June 2007; 23:38	STS-117	Transferred to Expedition 16		
16		(Russia) Yuri Malenchenko (United States) Peggy Whitson	10 October 2007; 13:22	Soyuz TMA-11	19 April 2008; 08:30	Soyuz TMA-11	191.80
16		(United States) Clayton Anderson	Transferred from Expedition 15		7 November 2007; 18:01	STS-120	151.77
16		(United States) Daniel M. Tani	23 October 2007; 15:38	STS-120	20 February 2008; 14:07	STS-122	119.94
16		(France) Léopold Eyharts	7 February 2008; 19:45	STS-122	27 March 2008; 06:28	STS-123	48.55
16		(United States) Garrett Reisman	11 March 2008; 06:28	STS-123	Transferred to Expedition 17		
17		(Russia) Sergey Volkov (Russia) Oleg Kononenko	8 April 2008; 11:16	Soyuz TMA-12	24 October 2008; 03:37	Soyuz TMA-12	198.68
17		(United States) Garrett Reisman	Transferred from Expedition 16		14 June 2008; 15:16	STS-124	95.37
17		(United States) Gregory Chamitoff	31 May 2008; 21:02	STS-124	Transferred to Expedition 18		
18		(Russia) Yury Lonchakov (United States) Michael Fincke	12 October 2008; 07:01	Soyuz TMA-13	8 April 2009; 07:16	Soyuz TMA-13	178.01
18		(United States) Gregory Chamitoff	Transferred from Expedition 17		30 November 2008; 21:25	STS-126	183.02
18		(United States) Sandra Magnus	15 November 2008; 00:55	STS-126	28 March 2009; 19:13	STS-119	133.76
18		(Japan) Koichi Wakata	15 March 2009; 23:43	STS-119	Transferred to Expedition 19		
19		(Russia) Gennady Padalka (United States) Michael Barratt	26 March 2009; 11:49	Soyuz TMA-14	Transferred to Expedition 20		
19		(Japan) Koichi Wakata	Transferred from Expedition 18		Transferred to Expedition 20		
20		(Russia) Gennady Padalka (United States) Michael Barratt	Transferred from Expedition 19		11 October 2009; 04:32	Soyuz TMA-14	198.70
20		(Japan) Koichi Wakata	Transferred from Expedition 19		31 July 2009; 14:48	STS-127	137
20		(United States) Timothy Kopra	15 July 2009; 22:03	STS-127	12 September 2009; 00:53	STS-128	58.12
20		(Russia) Roman Romanenko (Belgium) Frank De Winne (Canada) Robert Thirsk	27 May 2009; 10:34	Soyuz TMA-15	Transferred to Expedition 21		
20		(United States) Nicole Stott	29 August 2009; 03:59	STS-128	Transferred to Expedition 21		
21		(Russia) Roman Romanenko (Belgium) Frank De Winne (Canada) Robert Thirsk	Transferred from Expedition 20		1 December 2009; 07:16	Soyuz TMA-15	187.86
21		(United States) Nicole Stott	Transferred from Expedition 20		27 November 2009; 14:44	STS-129	90.45
21		(Russia) Maksim Surayev (United States) Jeffrey Williams	30 September 2009; 07:14	Soyuz TMA-16	Transferred to Expedition 22		
22		(Russia) Maksim Surayev (United States) Jeffrey Williams	Transferred from Expedition 21		18 March 2010; 11:24	Soyuz TMA-16	169.04
22		(Russia) Oleg Kotov (Japan) Soichi Noguchi (United States) Timothy Creamer	20 December 2009; 21:52	Soyuz TMA-17	Transferred to Expedition 23		
23		(Russia) Oleg Kotov (Japan) Soichi Noguchi (United States) Timothy Creamer	Transferred from Expedition 22		2 June 2010; 03:25	Soyuz TMA-17	163.23
23		(Russia) Aleksandr Skvortsov (Russia) Mikhail Kornienko (United States) Tracy Caldwell Dyson	2 April 2010; 04:05	Soyuz TMA-18	Transferred to Expedition 24		
24		(Russia) Aleksandr Skvortsov (Russia) Mikhail Kornienko (United States) Tracy Caldwell Dyson	Transferred from Expedition 23		25 September 2010; 05:23	Soyuz TMA-18	176.05
24		(Russia) Fyodor Yurchikhin (United States) Shannon Walker (United States) Douglas H. Wheelock	15 June 2010; 21:35	Soyuz TMA-19	Transferred to Expedition 25		
25		(Russia) Fyodor Yurchikhin (United States) Shannon Walker (United States) Douglas H. Wheelock	Transferred from Expedition 24		26 November 2010; 04:46	Soyuz TMA-19	163.30
25		(Russia) Aleksandr Kaleri (Russia) Oleg Skripochka (United States) Scott Kelly	7 October 2010; 23:10	Soyuz TMA-01M	Transferred to Expedition 26		
26		(Russia) Aleksandr Kaleri (Russia) Oleg Skripochka (United States) Scott Kelly	Transferred from Expedition 25		16 March 2011; 07:54	Soyuz TMA-01M	159.36
26		(Russia) Dmitri Kondratyev (Italy) Paolo Nespoli (United States) Catherine Coleman	15 December 2010; 19:09	Soyuz TMA-20	Transferred to Expedition 27		
27		(Russia) Dmitri Kondratyev (Italy) Paolo Nespoli (United States) Catherine Coleman	Transferred from Expedition 26		24 May 2011; 02:27	Soyuz TMA-20	160.10
27		(Russia) Aleksandr Samokutyayev (Russia) Andrei Borisenko (United States) Ronald J. Garan Jr.	4 April 2011; 22:18	Soyuz TMA-21	Transferred to Expedition 28		
28		(Russia) Aleksandr Samokutyayev (Russia) Andrei Borisenko (United States) Ronald J. Garan Jr.	Transferred from Expedition 27		16 September 2011; 00:38	Soyuz TMA-21	164.10
28		(Russia) Sergey Volkov (Japan) Satoshi Furukawa (United States) Michael E. Fossum	7 June 2011; 20:12	Soyuz TMA-02M	Transferred to Expedition 29		
29		(Russia) Sergey Volkov (Japan) Satoshi Furukawa (United States) Michael E. Fossum	Transferred from Expedition 28		22 November 2011; 02:26	Soyuz TMA-02M	167.26
29		(Russia) Anton Shkaplerov (Russia) Anatoli Ivanishin (United States) Daniel C. Burbank	14 November 2011; 04:14	Soyuz TMA-22	Transferred to Expedition 30		
30		(Russia) Anton Shkaplerov (Russia) Anatoli Ivanishin (United States) Daniel C. Burbank	Transferred from Expedition 29		27 April 2012; 11:45	Soyuz TMA-22	165.31
30		(Russia) Oleg Kononenko (Netherlands) André Kuipers (United States) Donald Pettit	21 December 2011; 13:16	Soyuz TMA-03M	Transferred to Expedition 31		
31		(Russia) Oleg Kononenko (Netherlands) André Kuipers (United States) Donald Pettit	Transferred from Expedition 30		1 July 2012; 08:14	Soyuz TMA-03M	192.83
31		(Russia) Gennady Padalka (Russia) Sergei Revin (United States) Joseph M. Acaba	15 May 2012; 03:01	Soyuz TMA-04M	Transferred to Expedition 32		
32		(Russia) Gennady Padalka (Russia) Sergei Revin (United States) Joseph M. Acaba	Transferred from Expedition 31		17 September 2012; 02:53	Soyuz TMA-04M	124.99
32		(Russia) Yuri Malenchenko (United States) Sunita Williams (Japan) Akihiko Hoshide	15 July 2012; 02:40	Soyuz TMA-05M	Transferred to Expedition 33		
33		(Russia) Yuri Malenchenko (United States) Sunita Williams (Japan) Akihiko Hoshide	Transferred from Expedition 32		19 November 2012; 01:56	Soyuz TMA-05M	126.97
33		(Russia) Oleg Novitsky (Russia) Evgeny Tarelkin (United States) Kevin A. Ford	23 October 2012; 10:51	Soyuz TMA-06M	Transferred to Expedition 34		
34		(Russia) Oleg Novitsky (Russia) Evgeny Tarelkin (United States) Kevin A. Ford	Transferred from Expedition 33		15 March 2013; 03:06	Soyuz TMA-06M	143.18
34		(Russia) Roman Romanenko (Canada) Chris Hadfield (United States) Thomas Marshburn	19 December 2012; 11:12	Soyuz TMA-07M	Transferred to Expedition 35		
35		(Russia) Roman Romanenko (Canada) Chris Hadfield (United States) Thomas Marshburn	Transferred from Expedition 34		14 May 2013; 03:31	Soyuz TMA-07M	145.64
35		(Russia) Pavel Vinogradov (Russia) Alexander Misurkin (United States) Christopher Cassidy	28 March 2013; 20:43	Soyuz TMA-08M	Transferred to Expedition 36		
36		(Russia) Pavel Vinogradov (Russia) Alexander Misurkin (United States) Christopher Cassidy	Transferred from Expedition 35		11 September 2013; 02:58	Soyuz TMA-08M	166.25
36		(Russia) Fyodor Yurchikhin (Italy) Luca Parmitano (United States) Karen Nyberg	28 May 2013; 20:31	Soyuz TMA-09M	Transferred to Expedition 37		
37		(Russia) Fyodor Yurchikhin (Italy) Luca Parmitano (United States) Karen Nyberg	Transferred from Expedition 36		11 November 2013; 02:49	Soyuz TMA-09M	166.25
37		(Russia) Oleg Kotov (Russia) Sergey Ryazansky (United States) Michael S. Hopkins	25 September 2013; 20:58	Soyuz TMA-10M	Transferred to Expedition 38		
38		(Russia) Oleg Kotov (Russia) Sergey Ryazansky (United States) Michael S. Hopkins	Transferred from Expedition 37		11 March 2014; 03:24	Soyuz TMA-10M	166.25
38		(Russia) Mikhail Tyurin (United States) Richard Mastracchio (Japan) Koichi Wakata	6 November 2013; 04:14	Soyuz TMA-11M	Transferred to Expedition 39		
39		(Russia) Mikhail Tyurin (United States) Richard Mastracchio (Japan) Koichi Wakata	Transferred from Expedition 38		14 May 2014; 01:58	Soyuz TMA-11M	187.91
39		(Russia) Aleksandr Skvortsov (Russia) Oleg Artemyev (United States) Steven Swanson	25 March 2014; 21:17	Soyuz TMA-12M	Transferred to Expedition 40		
40		(Russia) Aleksandr Skvortsov (Russia) Oleg Artemyev (United States) Steven Swanson	Transferred from Expedition 39		11 September 2014; 02:23	Soyuz TMA-12M	169.20
40		(Russia) Maksim Surayev (United States) Reid Wiseman (Germany) Alexander Gerst	28 May 2014; 19:57	Soyuz TMA-13M	Transferred to Expedition 41		
41		(Russia) Maksim Surayev (United States) Reid Wiseman (Germany) Alexander Gerst	Transferred from Expedition 40		10 November 2014; 03:58	Soyuz TMA-13M	165.33
41		(Russia) Aleksandr Samokutyayev (Russia) Yelena Serova (United States) Barry E. Wilmore	25 September 2014; 20:25	Soyuz TMA-14M	Transferred to Expedition 42		
42		(Russia) Aleksandr Samokutyayev (Russia) Yelena Serova (United States) Barry E. Wilmore	Transferred from Expedition 41		12 March 2015; 02:07	Soyuz TMA-14M	167.25
42		(Russia) Anton Shkaplerov (Italy) Samantha Cristoforetti (United States) Terry W. Virts	23 November 2014; 21:01	Soyuz TMA-15M	Transferred to Expedition 43		
43		(Russia) Anton Shkaplerov (Italy) Samantha Cristoforetti (United States) Terry W. Virts	Transferred from Expedition 42		11 June 2015; 13:44	Soyuz TMA-15M	199.70
43		(Russia) Gennady Padalka	27 March 2015; 19:42	Soyuz TMA-16M	Transferred to Expedition 44		
43		(Russia) Mikhail Kornienko (United States) Scott Kelly	27 March 2015; 19:42	Soyuz TMA-16M	Transferred to Expeditions 44, 45, and 46 one year mission		
44		(Russia) Gennady Padalka	Transferred from Expedition 43		12 September 2015; 00:51	Soyuz TMA-16M	169
44		(Russia) Mikhail Kornienko (United States) Scott Kelly	Transferred from Expedition 43		Transferred to Expeditions 45 and 46 one year mission		
44		(Russia) Oleg Kononenko (Japan) Kimiya Yui (United States) Kjell N. Lindgren	22 July 2015; 21:02	Soyuz TMA-17M	Transferred to Expedition 45		
45		(Russia) Mikhail Kornienko (United States) Scott Kelly	Transferred from Expedition 44		Transferred to Expedition 46 one year mission		
45		(Russia) Oleg Kononenko (Japan) Kimiya Yui (United States) Kjell N. Lindgren	Transferred from Expedition 44		11 December 2015; 13:12	Soyuz TMA-17M	141.66
45		(Russia) Sergey Volkov	2 September 2015; 04:37	Soyuz TMA-18M	Transferred to Expedition 46		
46		(Russia) Sergey Volkov	Transferred from Expedition 45		2 March 2016; 01:02:30	Soyuz TMA-18M	182 (Note: This duration measured the length of Soyuz TMA-18M from start to finish.)
46		(Russia) Mikhail Kornienko (United States) Scott Kelly	Transferred from Expedition 45		2 March 2016; 01:02:30	Soyuz TMA-18M	340 (Note: Kelly and Korniyenko were to remain aboard the ISS for approximately one year. This duration measured the length of their cumulative stay in space from Expedition 43 through Expedition 46.)
46		(Russia) Yuri Malenchenko (United States) Timothy Kopra (United Kingdom) Tim Peake	15 December 2015; 17:33:29	Soyuz TMA-19M	Transferred to Expedition 47		
47		(Russia) Yuri Malenchenko (United States) Timothy Kopra (United Kingdom) Tim Peake	Transferred from Expedition 46		18 June 2016; 09:15	Soyuz TMA-19M	185.91
47		(Russia) Aleksey Ovchinin (Russia) Oleg Skripochka (United States) Jeffrey Williams	18 March 2016; 21:26:38	Soyuz TMA-20M	Transferred to Expedition 48		
48		(Russia) Oleg Skripochka (Russia) Aleksey Ovchinin (United States) Jeffrey Williams	Transferred from Expedition 47		7 September 2016; 01:13	Soyuz TMA-20M	172
48		(Russia) Anatoli Ivanishin (Japan) Takuya Onishi (United States) Kathleen Rubins	7 July 2016; 01:36	Soyuz MS-01	Transferred to Expedition 49		
49		(Russia) Anatoli Ivanishin (Japan) Takuya Onishi (United States) Kathleen Rubins	Transferred from Expedition 48		30 October 2016; 03:58	Soyuz MS-01	115
49		(Russia) Sergey Ryzhikov (Russia) Andrei Borisenko (United States) Shane Kimbrough	19 October 2016; 08:05	Soyuz MS-02	Transferred to Expedition 50		
50		(Russia) Sergey Ryzhikov (Russia) Andrei Borisenko (United States) Shane Kimbrough	Transferred from Expedition 49		10 April 2017; 11:20	Soyuz MS-02	173
50		(Russia) Oleg Novitsky (France) Thomas Pesquet (United States) Peggy Whitson	17 November 2016; 20:17	Soyuz MS-03	Transferred to Expedition 51		
51		(Russia) Oleg Novitsky (France) Thomas Pesquet	Transferred from Expedition 50		2 June 2017; 14:10	Soyuz MS-03	196.72
51		(United States) Peggy Whitson	Transferred from Expedition 50		Transferred to Expedition 52		
51		(Russia) Fyodor Yurchikhin (United States) Jack D. Fischer	20 April 2017; 07:13	Soyuz MS-04	Transferred to Expedition 52		
52		(Russia) Fyodor Yurchikhin (United States) Jack D. Fischer	Transferred from Expedition 51		3 September 2017; 01:22	Soyuz MS-04	136
52		(United States) Peggy Whitson	Transferred from Expedition 51		3 September 2017; 01:22	Soyuz MS-04	289 (Note: Whitson remained onboard the ISS for three extra months. This duration was for the length of her cumulative stay in space from Expedition 50 through Expedition 52.)
52		(Russia) Sergey Ryazansky (United States) Randolph Bresnik (Italy) Paolo Nespoli	28 July 2017; 15:41	Soyuz MS-05	Transferred to Expedition 53		
53		(Russia) Sergey Ryazansky (United States) Randolph Bresnik (Italy) Paolo Nespoli	Transferred from Expedition 52		14 December 2017; 08:38	Soyuz MS-05	139
53		(Russia) Alexander Misurkin (United States) Mark T. Vande Hei (United States) Joseph M. Acaba	12 September 2017; 21:17	Soyuz MS-06	Transferred to Expedition 54		
54		(Russia) Alexander Misurkin (United States) Mark T. Vande Hei (United States) Joseph M. Acaba	Transferred from Expedition 53		28 February 2018; 02:31	Soyuz MS-06	168
54		(Russia) Anton Shkaplerov (United States) Scott D. Tingle (Japan) Norishige Kanai	17 December 2017; 07:21	Soyuz MS-07	Transferred to Expedition 55		
55		(Russia) Anton Shkaplerov (United States) Scott D. Tingle (Japan) Norishige Kanai	Transferred from Expedition 54		3 June 2018; 12:39	Soyuz MS-07	168
55		(Russia) Oleg Artemyev (United States) Andrew J. Feustel (United States) Richard R. Arnold	21 March 2018; 17:44	Soyuz MS-08	Transferred to Expedition 56		
56		(Russia) Oleg Artemyev (United States) Andrew J. Feustel (United States) Richard R. Arnold	Transferred from Expedition 55		4 October 2018; 11:44:45	Soyuz MS-08	196
56		(Russia) Sergey Prokopyev (Germany) Alexander Gerst (United States) Serena Auñón-Chancellor	6 June 2018; 11:12	Soyuz MS-09	Transferred to Expedition 57		
57		(Russia) Sergey Prokopyev (Germany) Alexander Gerst (United States) Serena Auñón-Chancellor	Transferred from Expedition 56		20 December 2018; 05:02	Soyuz MS-09	197
57		(Russia) Oleg Kononenko (Canada) David Saint-Jacques (United States) Anne McClain	3 December 2018; 11:31	Soyuz MS-11	Transferred to Expedition 58		
58		(Russia) Oleg Kononenko (Canada) David Saint-Jacques (United States) Anne McClain	Transferred from Expedition 57		Transferred to Expedition 59		
59		(Russia) Oleg Kononenko (Canada) David Saint-Jacques (United States) Anne McClain	Transferred from Expedition 58		25 June 2019; 02:47:50	Soyuz MS-11	204
59		(Russia) Aleksey Ovchinin (United States) Nick Hague (United States) Christina Koch	15 March 2019; 01:01	Soyuz MS-12	Transferred to Expedition 60		
60		(Russia) Aleksey Ovchinin (United States) Nick Hague	Transferred from Expedition 59		3 October 2019; 10:59	Soyuz MS-12	203
60		(United States) Christina Koch	Transferred from Expedition 59		Transferred to Expedition 61		
60		(Russia) Aleksandr Skvortsov (Italy) Luca Parmitano (United States) Andrew R. Morgan	20 July 2019; 16:28:21	Soyuz MS-13	Transferred to Expedition 61		
61		(Russia) Aleksandr Skvortsov (Italy) Luca Parmitano	Transferred from Expedition 60		6 February 2020; 05:50	Soyuz MS-13	201
61		(United States) Christina Koch	Transferred from Expedition 60		6 February 2020; 05:50	Soyuz MS-13	328
61		(United States) Andrew R. Morgan	Transferred from Expedition 60		Transferred to Expedition 62		
61		(Russia) Oleg Skripochka (United States) Jessica Meir	25 September 2019; 13:57:43	Soyuz MS-15	Transferred to Expedition 62		
62		(Russia) Oleg Skripochka (United States) Jessica Meir	Transferred from Expedition 61		17 April 2020; 05:16	Soyuz MS-15	205
62		(United States) Andrew R. Morgan	Transferred from Expedition 61		17 April 2020; 05:16	Soyuz MS-15	272
62		(Russia) Anatoli Ivanishin (Russia) Ivan Vagner (United States) Christopher Cassidy	9 April 2020; 08:05	Soyuz MS-16	Transferred to Expedition 63		
63		(Russia) Anatoli Ivanishin (Russia) Ivan Vagner (United States) Christopher Cassidy	Transferred from Expedition 62		21 October 2020; 23:32	Soyuz MS-16	196
63		(United States) Doug Hurley (United States) Bob Behnken	31 May 2020; 14:27	SpaceX Demo-2	1 August 2020; 23:35	SpaceX Demo-2	64
63		(Russia) Sergey Ryzhikov (Russia) Sergey Kud-Sverchkov (United States) Kathleen Rubins	14 October 2020; 05:45:04	Soyuz MS-17	Transferred to Expedition 64		
64		(Russia) Sergey Ryzhikov (Russia) Sergey Kud-Sverchkov (United States) Kathleen Rubins	Transferred from Expedition 63		17 April 2021; 04:55	Soyuz MS-17	185
64		(United States) Michael Hopkins (United States) Victor Glover (Japan) Soichi Noguchi (United States) Shannon Walker	16 November 2020; 00:27:17	SpaceX Crew-1	Transferred to Expedition 65		
64		(Russia) Oleg Novitsky (Russia) Pyotr Dubrov (United States) Mark Vande Hei	9 April 2021; 07:42:41	Soyuz MS-18	Transferred to Expedition 65		
65		(United States) Michael Hopkins (United States) Victor Glover (Japan) Soichi Noguchi (United States) Shannon Walker	Transferred from Expedition 64		2 May 2021; 06:56:33	SpaceX Crew-1	168
65		(Russia) Oleg Novitsky	Transferred from Expedition 64		17 October 2021; 01:14:05	Soyuz MS-18	191
65		(Russia) Pyotr Dubrov (United States) Mark Vande Hei	Transferred from Expedition 64		Transferred to Expedition 66		
65		(United States) Shane Kimbrough (United States) K. Megan McArthur (Japan) Akihiko Hoshide (France) Thomas Pesquet	23 April 2021; 09:49:02	SpaceX Crew-2	Transferred to Expedition 66		
65		(Russia) Anton Shkaplerov	5 October 2021; 08:55:02	Soyuz MS-19	Transferred to Expedition 66		
66		(United States) R. Shane Kimbrough (United States) K. Megan McArthur (Japan) Akihiko Hoshide (France) Thomas Pesquet	Transferred from Expedition 65		8 November 2021; 19:05	SpaceX Crew-2	199
66		(Russia) Anton Shkaplerov	Transferred from Expedition 65		30 March 2022; 07:21:03	Soyuz MS-19	176
66		(Russia) Pyotr Dubrov (United States) Mark Vande Hei	Transferred from Expedition 65		30 March 2022; 07:21:03	Soyuz MS-19	355
66		(United States) Raja Chari (United States) Thomas Marshburn (United States) Kayla Barron (Germany) Matthias Maurer	11 November 2021; 02:03:30	SpaceX Crew-3	Transferred to Expedition 67		
66		(Russia) Oleg Artemyev (Russia) Denis Matveev (Russia) Sergey Korsakov	18 March 2022; 15:55:18	Soyuz MS-21	Transferred to Expedition 67		
67		(United States) Raja Chari (United States) Thomas Marshburn (United States) Kayla Barron (Germany) Matthias Maurer	Transferred from Expedition 66		6 May 2022; 04:43	SpaceX Crew-3	177
67		(Russia) Oleg Artemyev (Russia) Denis Matveev (Russia) Sergey Korsakov	Transferred from Expedition 66		29 September 2022; 10:57	Soyuz MS-21	195
67		(United States) Kjell Lindgren (United States) Bob Hines (Italy) Samantha Cristoforetti (United States) Jessica Watkins	27 April 2022; 07:52:55	SpaceX Crew-4	Transferred to Expedition 68		
67		(Russia) Sergey Prokopyev (Russia) Dmitry Petelin (United States) Francisco Rubio	21 September 2022; 13:54	Soyuz MS-22	Transferred to Expedition 68		
68		(United States) Kjell Lindgren (United States) Bob Hines (Italy) Samantha Cristoforetti (United States) Jessica Watkins	Transferred from Expedition 67		14 October 2022; 20:55	SpaceX Crew-4	170.5
68		(Russia) Sergey Prokopyev (Russia) Dmitry Petelin (United States) Francisco Rubio	Transferred from Expedition 67		Transferred to Expedition 69		
68		(United States) Nicole Aunapu Mann (United States) Josh A. Cassada (Japan) Koichi Wakata (Russia) Anna Kikina	6 October 2022; 16:00:57	SpaceX Crew-5	11 March 2023; 07:21	SpaceX Crew-5	157
68		(United States) Stephen Bowen (United States) Warren Hoburg (United Arab Emirates) Sultan Al Neyadi (Russia) Andrey Fedyaev	2 March 2023; 05:34:14	SpaceX Crew-6	Transferred to Expedition 69		
69		(Russia) Sergey Prokopyev (Russia) Dmitry Petelin (United States) Francisco Rubio	Transferred from Expedition 68		27 September 2023; 07:54	Soyuz MS-23	371
69		(United States) Stephen Bowen (United States) Warren Hoburg (United Arab Emirates) Sultan Al Neyadi (Russia) Andrey Fedyaev	Transferred from Expedition 68		3 September 2023; 11:05	SpaceX Crew-6	186
69		(United States) Jasmin Moghbeli (Denmark) Andreas Mogensen (Japan) Satoshi Furukawa (Russia) Konstantin Borisov	27 August 2023; 13:16	SpaceX Crew-7	Transferred to Expedition 70		
69		(Russia) Oleg Kononenko (Russia) Nikolai Chub (United States) Loral O'Hara	15 September 2023; 18:53	Soyuz MS-24	Transferred to Expedition 70		
70		(United States) Jasmin Moghbeli (Denmark) Andreas Mogensen (Japan) Satoshi Furukawa (Russia) Konstantin Borisov	Transferred from Expedition 69		11 March 2024; 15:20	SpaceX Crew-7	199
70		(United States) Loral O'Hara	Transferred from Expedition 69		6 April 2024; 03:54	Soyuz MS-24	204
70		(Russia) Oleg Kononenko (Russia) Nikolai Chub	Transferred from Expedition 69		Transferred to Expedition 71		
70		(United States) Matthew Dominick (United States) Michael Barratt (United States) Jeanette Epps (Russia) Alexander Grebenkin	5 March 2024; 08:00	SpaceX Crew-8	Transferred to Expedition 71		
70		(United States) Tracy Caldwell-Dyson	25 March 2024; 15:02	Soyuz MS-25	Transferred to Expedition 71		
71		(Russia) Oleg Kononenko (Russia) Nikolai Chub	Transferred from Expedition 70		23 September 2024; 08:36	Soyuz MS-25	374
71		(United States) Tracy Caldwell-Dyson	Transferred from Expedition 70		23 September 2024; 08:36	Soyuz MS-25	184
71		(United States) Matthew Dominick (United States) Michael Barratt (United States) Jeanette Epps (Russia) Alexander Grebenkin	Transferred from Expedition 70		Transferred to Expedition 72		
71		(United States) Barry E. Wilmore (United States) Sunita Williams	6 June 2024; 17:34	Boeing Crew Flight Test	Transferred to Expedition 72		
71		(Russia) Aleksey Ovchinin (Russia) Ivan Vagner (United States) Donald Pettit	11 September 2024; 19:32	Soyuz MS-26	Transferred to Expedition 72		
72		(United States) Matthew Dominick (United States) Michael Barratt (United States) Jeanette Epps (Russia) Alexander Grebenkin	Transferred from Expedition 71		23 October 2024; 21:05	SpaceX Crew-8	236
72		(Russia) Aleksey Ovchinin (Russia) Ivan Vagner (United States) Donald Pettit	Transferred from Expedition 71		19 April 2025; 21:57	Soyuz MS-26	220
72		(United States) Barry E. Wilmore (United States) Sunita Williams	Transferred from Expedition 71		18 March 2025; 05:05	SpaceX Crew-9	286
72		(United States) Nick Hague (Russia) Aleksandr Gorbunov	29 September 2024; 21:30	SpaceX Crew-9	18 March 2025; 05:05	SpaceX Crew-9	171
72		(United States) Anne McClain (United States) Nichole Ayers (Japan) Takuya Onishi (Russia) Kirill Peskov	16 March 2025; 04:04	SpaceX Crew-10	Transferred to Expedition 73		
72		(Russia) Sergey Ryzhikov (Russia) Alexey Zubritsky (United States) Jonny Kim	8 April 2025; 08:57	Soyuz MS-27	Transferred to Expedition 73		
73		(United States) Anne McClain (United States) Nichole Ayers (Japan) Takuya Onishi (Russia) Kirill Peskov	Transferred from Expedition 72		8 August 2025; 22:15	SpaceX Crew-10	148
73		(Russia) Sergey Ryzhikov (Russia) Alexey Zubritsky (United States) Jonny Kim	Transferred from Expedition 72		9 December 2025; 01:41	Soyuz MS-27	245
73		(United States) Zena Cardman (United States) Michael Fincke (Japan) Kimiya Yui (Russia) Oleg Platonov	2 August 2025; 06:26	SpaceX Crew-11	Transferred to Expedition 74		
73		(Russia) Sergey Kud-Sverchkov (Russia) Sergey Mikayev (United States) Christopher Williams	27 November 2025; 12:34	Soyuz MS-28	Transferred to Expedition 74		
74		(United States) Zena Cardman (United States) Michael Fincke (Japan) Kimiya Yui (Russia) Oleg Platonov	Transferred from Expedition 73		14 January 2026; 22:20	SpaceX Crew-11	167
74		(Russia) Sergey Kud-Sverchkov (Russia) Sergey Mikayev (United States) Christopher Williams	Transferred from Expedition 73		26 July 2026; 07:02	Soyuz MS-28	241
74		(United States) Jessica Meir (United States) Jack Hathaway (France) Sophie Adenot (Russia) Andrey Fedyaev	14 February 2026; 20:15	SpaceX Crew-12	Transferred to Expedition 75		
74		(Russia) Pyotr Dubrov (Russia) Anna Kikina (United States) Anil Menon	14 July 2026; 17:52	Soyuz MS-29	Transferred to Expedition 75		

== Current expedition ==
Exp.	Patch	Crew	Arrival (UTC)	Arrival Flight	Departure (UTC)	Departure Flight	Duration (days)
75		(United States) Jessica Meir (United States) Jack Hathaway (France) Sophie Adenot (Russia) Andrey Fedyaev	Transferred from Expedition 74		7 October 2026; 12:05	SpaceX Crew-12	237
75		(Russia) Pyotr Dubrov (Note: Current ISS commander.) (Russia) Anna Kikina (United States) Anil Menon	Transferred from Expedition 74		5 April 2027 (planned)	Soyuz MS-29	265 (planned)
75		(United States) Jessica Watkins (United States) Luke Delaney (Canada) Joshua Kutryk (Russia) Sergey Teteryatnikov	1 October 2026; 23:05	SpaceX Crew-13	Will be transferred to Expedition 76		
75		(Russia) Dmitry Petelin (Russia) Konstantin Borisov (United States) Deniz Burnham	24 March 2027 (planned)	Soyuz MS-30	Will be transferred to Expedition 76		

== Future expeditions ==
Exp.	Patch	Crew	Arrival (UTC)	Arrival Flight	Departure (UTC)	Departure Flight	Duration (days)
76		(United States) Jessica Watkins (United States) Luke Delaney (Canada) Joshua Kutryk (Russia) Sergey Teteryatnikov	Will be transferred from Expedition 75		March 2027 (planned)	SpaceX Crew-13	
76		(Russia) Dmitry Petelin (Russia) Konstantin Borisov (United States) Deniz Burnham	Will be transferred from Expedition 75		November 2027 (planned)	Soyuz MS-30	

== Cancelled expedition ==
Exp.	Crew	Arrival		Cancellation Reason
Exp.	Crew	Date	Flight	Cancellation Reason
0	(Russia) Gennady Padalka (Russia) Nikolai Budarin	2000	Soyuz 7K-STM No. 205	Contingency mission if Zarya and Zvezda modules failed to dock; spacecraft reassigned to Soyuz TM-31.

== See also ==
- List of human spaceflights to the ISS
- List of International Space Station crew
- List of International Space Station visitors
- List of Mir Expeditions
- List of ESA space expeditions
- List of Tiangong Space Station expeditions
- List of commanders of the ISS
