= List of human spaceflights to the International Space Station =

This is a chronological list of spaceflights to the International Space Station (ISS), including long-term ISS crew, short term visitors, replacement/rescue missions and mixed human/cargo missions. Uncrewed visiting spacecraft are excluded (see Uncrewed spaceflights to the International Space Station for details). ISS crew members are listed in bold. "Time docked" refers to the spacecraft and does not always correspond to the crew.

As of 31 July 2025, 290 people from 26 countries had visited the space station, many of them multiple times. The United States sent 170 people, Russia sent 64, 11 were Japanese, nine were Canadian, six were Italian, four were French, four were German, two from the United Arab Emirates, Hungary and Saudi Arabia and one each from Belgium, Brazil, Denmark, Israel, Kazakhstan, Malaysia, the Netherlands, India, Turkey, Belarus, South Africa, Poland, South Korea, Spain, Sweden, and the United Kingdom.

U.S. Space Shuttle missions were capable of carrying more humans and cargo than the Russian Soyuz spacecraft, resulting in more U.S. short-term human visits until the Space Shuttle program was discontinued in 2011. Between 2011 and 2020, Soyuz was the sole means of human transport to the ISS, delivering mostly long-term crew. Russian cargo deliveries have been exclusively carried out by the uncrewed missions of Progress spacecraft, requiring fewer human spaceflights.

U.S. return to flight to the ISS began in March 2019 after SpaceX's Crew Dragon completed its uncrewed Demo-1 mission before completing its piloted Demo-2 in May 2020.

Continued international collaboration on ISS missions has been thrown into doubt by the 2022 Russian invasion of Ukraine and related sanctions on Russia, but is still continuing as of 2026.

The ISS is set to be decommissioned and deorbited in 2030, however, in 2025 Russia announced its intention to "recycle" the Russian Orbital Segment as the basis for their new Russian Orbital Station. The first segment of the private U.S. Axiom Station, the Payload Power Thermal Module, is also set to attach to the ISS before the second module, Habitat One, is launched.

== Completed ==
	ISS flight	Mission	Crew	Crew photo	Notes
1.	2A	**STS-88** Endeavour; Launch: December 4, 1998; Time docked: 6 days 18h	(United States) Robert D. Cabana (United States) Frederick W. Sturckow (United States) Nancy J. Currie (United States) Jerry L. Ross (United States) James H. Newman (Russia) Sergei Krikalev		Deliver Unity Module 3 spacewalks
2.	2A.1	**STS-96** Discovery; Launch: May 27, 1999; Time docked: 5 days 18h	(United States) Kent V. Rominger (United States) Rick D. Husband (United States) Tamara E. Jernigan (United States) Ellen L. Ochoa (United States) Daniel T. Barry (Canada) Julie Payette (Russia) Valeri Tokarev		1 spacewalk
3.	2A.2a	**STS-101** Atlantis; Launch: May 19, 2000; Time docked: 5 days 18h	(United States) James D. Halsell (United States) Scott J. Horowitz (United States) Mary E. Weber (United States) Jeffrey N. Williams (United States) James S. Voss (United States) Susan J. Helms (Russia) Yury Usachev		Boost orbit ~30 km 1 spacewalk
4.	2A.2b	**STS-106** Atlantis; Launch: September 8, 2000; Time docked: 7 days 21h	(United States) Terrence W. Wilcutt (United States) Scott D. Altman (United States) Edward T. Lu (United States) Richard A. Mastracchio (United States) Daniel C. Burbank (Russia) Yuri Malenchenko (Russia) Boris Morukov		1 spacewalk
5.	3A	**STS-92** Discovery; Launch: October 11, 2000; Time docked: 6 days 21h	(United States) Brian Duffy (United States) Pamela A. Melroy (United States) Leroy Chiao (United States) William S. McArthur (United States) Peter J. K. Wisoff (United States) Michael E. Lopez-Alegria (Japan) Koichi Wakata		Deliver Z1 Truss 4 spacewalks
6.	2R	**Soyuz TM-31** Launch: October 31, 2000; Time docked: ~183 days	(Russia) **Yuri Gidzenko** (Russia) **Sergei Krikalev** (United States) **William M. Shepherd**		Deliver Expedition 1 crew, the first long-duration stay.
7.	4A	**STS-97** Endeavour; Launch: November 30, 2000; Time docked: 6 days 23h	(United States) Brent W. Jett (United States) Michael J. Bloomfield (United States) Joseph R. Tanner (United States) Carlos I. Noriega (Canada) Marc Garneau		Deliver P6 Truss 3 spacewalks
8.	5A	**STS-98** Atlantis; Launch: February 7, 2001; Time docked: 6 days 21h	(United States) Kenneth D. Cockrell (United States) Mark L. Polansky (United States) Robert L. Curbeam (United States) Marsha S. Ivins (United States) Thomas D. Jones		Deliver Destiny Laboratory 3 spacewalks
9.	5A.1	**STS-102** Discovery; Launch: March 8, 2001; Time docked: 8 days 21h	(United States) James D. Wetherbee (United States) James M. Kelly (United States) Paul W. Richards (United States) Andrew S. W. Thomas (Russia) **Yury Usachev** (United States) **James S. Voss** (United States) **Susan J. Helms**		Deliver Expedition 2 crew Return Expedition 1 crew Use MPLM; 2 spacewalks
10.	6A	**STS-100** Endeavour; Launch: April 19, 2001; Time docked: 8 days 3h	(United States) Kent V. Rominger (United States) Jeffrey S. Ashby (United States) John L. Phillips (United States) Scott E. Parazynski (Canada) Chris A. Hadfield (Italy) Umberto Guidoni (Russia) Yuri Lonchakov		Use MPLM Deliver Canadarm2; 2 spacewalks
11.	2S	**Soyuz TM-32** Launch: April 28, 2001; Time docked: ~183 days	(Kazakhstan) Talgat Musabayev (Russia) Yuri Baturin (United States) Dennis A. Tito		All three crew returned on Soyuz TM-31 after a week
12.	7A	**STS-104** Atlantis; Launch: July 12, 2001; Time docked: 8 days 1h	(United States) Steven W. Lindsey (United States) Charles O. Hobaugh (United States) Michael L. Gernhardt (United States) Janet L. Kavandi (United States) James F. Reilly		Deliver Quest Joint Airlock 3 spacewalks
13.	7A.1	**STS-105** Discovery; Launch: August 10, 2001; Time docked: 9 days 20h	(United States) Scott J. Horowitz (United States) Frederick W. Sturckow (United States) Daniel T. Barry (United States) Patrick G. Forrester (United States) **Frank L. Culbertson** (Russia) **Mikhail Tyurin** (Russia) **Vladimir Dezhurov**		Deliver Expedition 3 crew Return Expedition 2 crew Use MPLM; 2 spacewalks
14.	3S	**Soyuz TM-33** Launch: October 21, 2001; Time docked: ~193 days	(Russia) Viktor Afanasyev (Russia) Konstantin Kozeyev (France) Claudie Haigneré		All three crew members returned on Soyuz TM-32 after 9 days 18 hours.
15.	UF-1	**STS-108** Endeavour; Launch: December 5, 2001; Time docked: 7 days 21h	(United States) Dominic L. Pudwill Gorie (United States) Mark E. Kelly (United States) Linda M. Godwin (United States) Daniel M. Tani (Russia) **Yuri Onufrienko** (United States) **Carl E. Walz** (United States) **Daniel W. Bursch**		Deliver Expedition 4 crew Return Expedition 3 crew Use MPLM; 1 spacewalk
16.	8A	**STS-110** Atlantis; Launch: April 8, 2002; Time docked: 7 days 2h	(United States) Michael J. Bloomfield (United States) Stephen N. Frick (United States) Jerry L. Ross (United States) Steven L. Smith (United States) Ellen L. Ochoa (United States) Lee M. E. Morin (United States) Rex J. Walheim		Deliver S0 Truss 4 spacewalks
17.	4S	**Soyuz TM-34** Launch: April 25, 2002; Time docked: ~196 days	(Russia) Yuri Gidzenko (Italy) Roberto Vittori (South Africa) Mark Shuttleworth		All three crew returned on Soyuz TM-33 after 8 days
18.	UF-2	**STS-111** Endeavour; Launch: June 5, 2002; Time docked: 7 days 22h	(United States) Kenneth D. Cockrell (United States) Paul S. Lockhart (United States) Franklin R. Chang-Diaz (France) Philippe Perrin (Russia) **Valery Korzun** (Russia) **Sergei Treshchev** (United States) **Peggy A. Whitson**		Deliver Expedition 5 crew Return Expedition 4 crew Deliver Mobile Base System; Use MPLM; 3 spacewalks
19.	9A	**STS-112** Atlantis; Launch: October 7, 2002; Time docked: 6 days 21h	(United States) Jeffrey S. Ashby (United States) Pamela A. Melroy (United States) David A. Wolf (United States) Sandra H. Magnus (United States) Piers J. Sellers (Russia) Fyodor Yurchikhin		Deliver S1 Truss 3 spacewalks
20.	5S	**Soyuz TMA-1** Launch: October 30, 2002; Time docked: ~183 days	(Russia) Sergei Zalyotin (Russia) Yuri Lonchakov (Belgium) Frank De Winne		All three crew returned on Soyuz TM-34 after a week
21.	11A	**STS-113** Endeavour; Launch: November 24, 2002; Time docked: 6 days 22h	(United States) James D. Wetherbee (United States) Paul S. Lockhart (United States) Michael E. Lopez-Alegria (United States) John B. Herrington (United States) **Kenneth D. Bowersox** (United States) **Donald R. Pettit** (Russia) **Nikolai Budarin**		Deliver Expedition 6 crew Return Expedition 5 crew Deliver P1 Truss; 3 spacewalks
Note: The Space Shuttle Columbia disaster occurred on February 1, 2003, grounding the Space Shuttle fleet until July 2005. Major ISS construction was suspended and resumed in September 2006 with STS-115.
22.	6S	**Soyuz TMA-2** Launch: April 28, 2003; Time docked: ~182 days	(Russia) **Yuri Malenchenko** (United States) **Edward T. Lu**		Deliver Expedition 7 crew The Expedition 6 crew returned in Soyuz TMA-1 a few days later
23.	7S	**Soyuz TMA-3** Launch: October 18, 2003; Time docked: ~192 days	(Russia) **Alexander Kaleri** (United States) **Michael Foale** (Spain) Pedro Duque		Deliver Expedition 8 crew Duque returned with the Expedition 7 crew on Soyuz TMA-2 a few days later
24.	8S	**Soyuz TMA-4** Launch: April 19, 2004; Time docked: ~185 days	(Russia) **Gennady Padalka** (United States) **Michael Fincke** (Netherlands) André Kuipers		Deliver Expedition 9 crew Kuipers returned with the Expedition 8 crew on Soyuz TMA-3 9 days later
25.	9S	**Soyuz TMA-5** Launch: October 14, 2004; Time docked: ~190 days	(Russia) **Salizhan Sharipov** (United States) **Leroy Chiao** (Russia) Yuri Shargin		Deliver Expedition 10 crew Shargin returned with the Expedition 9 crew on Soyuz TMA-4 a few days later
26.	10S	**Soyuz TMA-6**; Launch: April 15, 2005; Time docked: ~179 days	(Russia) **Sergei Krikalev** (United States) **John L. Phillips** (Italy) Roberto Vittori		Deliver Expedition 11 crew Vittori returned with the Expedition 10 crew on Soyuz TMA-5 a few days later
27.	LF1	**STS-114** Discovery; Launch: July 26, 2005; Time docked: 8 days 20h	(United States) Eileen M. Collins (United States) James M. Kelly (United States) Stephen K. Robinson (United States) Andrew S. W. Thomas (United States) Wendy B. Lawrence (United States) Charles J. Camarda (Japan) Soichi Noguchi		Return to flight mission Use MPLM; Space Shuttle inspection from ISS; 3 spacewalks
28.	11S	**Soyuz TMA-7**; Launch: October 1, 2005; Time docked: ~189 days	(Russia) **Valery Tokarev** (United States) **William S. McArthur** (United States) Gregory H. Olsen		Deliver Expedition 12 crew Olsen returned with the Expedition 11 crew on Soyuz TMA-6 a few days later
29.	12S	**Soyuz TMA-8**; Launch: March 30, 2006; Time docked: ~180 days	(Russia) **Pavel Vinogradov** (United States) **Jeffrey N. Williams** (Brazil) Marcos Pontes		Deliver Expedition 13 crew Pontes returned with the Expedition 12 crew on Soyuz TMA-7 9 days later
30.	ULF1.1	**STS-121** Discovery; Launch: July 4, 2006; Time docked: 8 days 19h	(United States) Steven W. Lindsey (United States) Mark E. Kelly (United States) Michael E. Fossum (United States) Lisa M. Nowak (United States) Stephanie D. Wilson (United States) Piers J. Sellers (Germany) **Thomas Reiter**		Deliver Reiter for Expedition 13 crew Space Shuttle inspection from ISS; 3 spacewalks
31.	12A	**STS-115** Atlantis; Launch: September 9, 2006; Time docked: 6 days 2h	(United States) Brent W. Jett (United States) Christopher J. Ferguson (United States) Daniel C. Burbank (United States) Heidemarie M. Stefanyshyn-Piper (United States) Joseph R. Tanner (Canada) Steven G. MacLean		Deliver P3/4 truss Space Shuttle inspection from ISS; 3 spacewalks
32.	13S	**Soyuz TMA-9**; Launch: September 18, 2006; Time docked: ~215 days	(Russia) **Mikhail Tyurin** (United States) **Michael E. Lopez-Alegria** (United States) / (Iran) Anousheh Ansari		Deliver Expedition 14 crew Ansari returned with the Expedition 13 crew on Soyuz TMA-8 8 days later
33.	12A.1	**STS-116** Discovery; Launch: December 10, 2006; Time docked: 7 days 23h	(United States) Mark L. Polansky (United States) William A. Oefelein (United States) Nicholas J. M. Patrick (United States) Robert L. Curbeam (United States) Joan E. Higginbotham (Sweden) Christer Fuglesang (United States) **Sunita L. Williams**		Deliver Williams for Expedition 14 crew Deliver P5 truss Space Shuttle inspection from ISS; 4 spacewalks
34.	14S	**Soyuz TMA-10**; Launch: April 7, 2007; Time docked: ~196 days	(Russia) **Oleg Kotov** (Russia) **Fyodor Yurchikhin** (United States) / (Hungary) Charles Simonyi		Deliver Expedition 15 crew Simonyi returned with the Expedition 14 crew on Soyuz TMA-9 12 days later
35.	13A	**STS-117** Atlantis; Launch: June 8, 2007; Time docked: 8 days 19h	(United States) Frederick W. Sturckow (United States) Lee J. Archambault (United States) Patrick G. Forrester (United States) Steven R. Swanson (United States) John D. Olivas (United States) James F. Reilly (United States) **Clayton C. Anderson**		Deliver Anderson for Expedition 15 crew Deliver S3/4 truss Space Shuttle inspection from ISS; 4 spacewalks
36.	13A.1	**STS-118** Endeavour; Launch: August 8, 2007; Time docked: 8 days 18h	(United States) Scott J. Kelly (United States) Charles O. Hobaugh (United States) Tracy E. Caldwell Dyson (United States) Richard A. Mastracchio (United States) Barbara R. Morgan (United States) Benjamin A. Drew (Canada) Dafydd R. Williams		Deliver S5 Truss Space Shuttle inspection from ISS; 4 spacewalks
37.	15S	**Soyuz TMA-11**; Launch: October 10, 2007; Time docked: ~189 days	(Russia) **Yuri Malenchenko** (United States) **Peggy A. Whitson** (Malaysia) Sheikh Muszaphar Shukor		Deliver Expedition 16 crew Shukor returned with the Expedition 15 crew on Soyuz TMA-10 a few days later
38.	10A	**STS-120** Discovery; Launch: October 23, 2007; Time docked: 10 days 22h	(United States) Pamela A. Melroy (United States) George D. Zamka (United States) Scott E. Parazynski (United States) Stephanie D. Wilson (United States) Douglas H. Wheelock (Italy) Paolo Nespoli (United States) **Daniel M. Tani**		Deliver Tani for Expedition 16 crew Deliver Harmony Module; Relocate P6 truss Space Shuttle inspection from ISS; 5 spacewalks
39.	1E	**STS-122** Atlantis; Launch: February 7, 2008; Time docked: 8 days 16h	(United States) Stephen N. Frick (United States) Alan G. Poindexter (United States) Leland D. Melvin (United States) Rex J. Walheim (United States) Stanley G. Love (Germany) Hans Schlegel (France) **Léopold Eyharts**		Deliver Eyharts for Expedition 16 crew Deliver Columbus module Space Shuttle inspection from ISS; 3 spacewalks
40.	1J/A	**STS-123** Endeavour; Launch: March 11, 2008; Time docked: 11 days 21h	(United States) Dominic L. Pudwill Gorie (United States) Gregory H. Johnson (United States) Robert L. Behnken (United States) Michael J. Foreman (United States) Richard M. Linnehan (Japan) Takao Doi (United States) **Garrett E. Reisman**		Deliver Reisman for Expedition 16 crew Deliver Kibō Experiment Logistics Module and Special Purpose Dexterous Manipulator; Space Shuttle inspection from ISS; 5 spacewalks
41.	16S	**Soyuz TMA-12**; Launch: April 8, 2008; Time docked: ~198 days	(Russia) **Sergei Volkov** (Russia) **Oleg Kononenko** (South Korea) Yi So Yeon		Deliver Expedition 17 crew Yi returned with the Expedition 16 crew on Soyuz TMA-11 a few days later
42.	1J	**STS-124** Discovery; Launch: May 31, 2008; Time docked: 8 days 17h	(United States) Mark E. Kelly (United States) Kenneth T. Ham (United States) Karen L. Nyberg (United States) Ronald J. Garan (United States) Michael E. Fossum (Japan) Akihiko Hoshide (United States) **Gregory E. Chamitoff**		Deliver Chamitoff for Expedition 17 crew Deliver Kibō Pressurized Module & Remote Manipulator System; Space Shuttle inspection from ISS; 3 spacewalks
43.	17S	**Soyuz TMA-13**; Launch: October 12, 2008; Time docked: ~164 days	(Russia) **Yuri Lonchakov** (United States) **Michael Fincke** (United States) Richard A. Garriott		Deliver Expedition 18 crew Garriott returned with the Expedition 17 crew on Soyuz TMA-12 a few days later
44.	ULF2	**STS-126** Endeavour; Launch: November 15, 2008; Time docked: 11 days 16h	(United States) Christopher J. Ferguson (United States) Eric A. Boe (United States) Donald R. Pettit (United States) Stephen G. Bowen (United States) Heidemarie M. Stefanyshyn-Piper (United States) Robert S. Kimbrough (United States) **Sandra H. Magnus**		Deliver Magnus for Expedition 18 crew Use MPLM; Service and repair the Solar Alpha Rotary Joints (SARJ); Space Shuttle inspection from ISS; 4 spacewalks
45.	15A	**STS-119** Discovery; Launch: March 15, 2009; Time docked: 8 days 22h	(United States) Lee J. Archambault (United States) Dominic A. Antonelli (United States) Joseph M. Acaba (United States) Steven R. Swanson (United States) Richard R. Arnold (United States) John L. Phillips (Japan) **Koichi Wakata**		Deliver Wakata for Expedition 18 crew Deliver S6 truss Space Shuttle inspection from ISS; 3 spacewalks
46.	18S	**Soyuz TMA-14**; Launch: March 26, 2009; Time docked: ~197 days	(Russia) **Gennady Padalka** (United States) **Michael R. Barratt** (United States) / (Hungary) Charles Simonyi		Deliver Expedition 19 crew Simonyi returned with the Expedition 18 crew on Soyuz TMA-13 a few days later
47.	19S	**Soyuz TMA-15**; Launch: May 27, 2009; Time docked: ~186 days	(Russia) **Roman Romanenko** (Belgium) **Frank de Winne** (Canada) **Robert B. Thirsk**		Deliver Expedition 20 crew
48.	2J/A	**STS-127** Endeavour; Launch: July 15, 2009; Time docked: 11 days 1h	(United States) Mark L. Polansky (United States) Douglas G. Hurley (United States) Christopher J. Cassidy (United States) Thomas H. Marshburn (United States) David A. Wolf (Canada) Julie Payette (United States) **Timothy L. Kopra**		Deliver Kopra for Expedition 20 crew Deliver Kibō Exposed Facility & Logistics Module Exposed Section; Space Shuttle inspection from ISS; 5 spacewalks
49.	17A	**STS-128** Discovery; Launch: August 29, 2009; Time docked: 9 days 19h	(United States) Frederick W. Sturckow (United States) Kevin A. Ford (United States) Patrick G. Forrester (United States) José M. Hernández (United States) John D. Olivas (Sweden) Christer Fuglesang (United States) **Nicole P. Stott**		Deliver Stott for Expedition 20 crew Use MPLM; Space Shuttle inspection from ISS; 3 spacewalks
50.	20S	**Soyuz TMA-16**; Launch: September 30, 2009; Time docked: ~167 days	(Russia) **Maksim Surayev** (United States) **Jeffrey N. Williams** (Canada) Guy Laliberté		Deliver Expedition 21 crew Laliberté returned with the Expedition 20 crew on Soyuz TMA-14 a few days later
51.	ULF3	**STS-129** Atlantis; Launch: November 16, 2009; Time docked: 6 days 17h	(United States) Charles O. Hobaugh (United States) Barry E. Wilmore (United States) Michael J. Foreman (United States) Randolph J. Bresnik (United States) Leland D. Melvin (United States) Robert L. Satcher		Deliver ELC1 and ELC2 Space Shuttle inspection from ISS; 3 spacewalks
52.	21S	**Soyuz TMA-17**; Launch: December 20, 2009; Time docked: ~162 days	(Russia) **Oleg Kotov** (United States) **Timothy J. Creamer** (Japan) **Soichi Noguchi**		Deliver Expedition 22 crew
53.	20A	**STS-130** Endeavour; Launch: February 8, 2010; Time docked: 9 days 19h	(United States) George D. Zamka (United States) Terry W. Virts (United States) Kathryn P. Hire (United States) Stephen K. Robinson (United States) Nicholas J. M. Patrick (United States) Robert L. Behnken		Deliver Node 3 and Cupola Space Shuttle inspection from ISS; 3 spacewalks
54.	22S	**Soyuz TMA-18**; Launch: April 2, 2010; Time docked: ~174 days	(Russia) **Aleksandr Skvortsov** (Russia) **Mikhail Korniyenko** (United States) **Tracy E. Caldwell Dyson**		Deliver Expedition 23 crew
55.	19A	**STS-131** Discovery; Launch: April 5, 2010; Time docked: 10 days 5h	(United States) Alan G. Poindexter (United States) James P. Dutton (United States) Richard A. Mastracchio (United States) Clayton C. Anderson (United States) Dorothy M. Metcalf-Lindenburger (United States) Stephanie D. Wilson (Japan) Naoko Yamazaki		Use MPLM Space Shuttle inspection from ISS; 3 spacewalks
56.	ULF4	**STS-132** Atlantis; Launch: May 14, 2010; Time docked: 7 days 1h	(United States) Kenneth T. Ham (United States) Dominic A. Antonelli (United States) Stephen G. Bowen (United States) Michael T. Good (United States) Piers J. Sellers (United States) Garrett E. Reisman		Deliver Mini-Research Module 1 Space Shuttle inspection from ISS; 3 spacewalks
57.	23S	**Soyuz TMA-19**; Launch: June 15, 2010; Time docked: ~162 days	(Russia) **Fyodor Yurchikhin** (United States) **Douglas H. Wheelock** (United States) **Shannon Walker**		Deliver Expedition 24 crew
58.	24S	**Soyuz TMA-01M**; Launch: October 7, 2010; Time docked: ~158 days	(Russia) **Alexander Kaleri** (Russia) **Oleg Skripochka** (United States) **Scott J. Kelly**		Deliver Expedition 25 crew
59.	25S	**Soyuz TMA-20**; Launch: December 15, 2010; Time docked: ~158 days	(Russia) **Dimitri Kondratyev** (United States) **Catherine G. Coleman** (Italy) **Paolo Nespoli**		Deliver Expedition 26 crew
60.	ULF5	**STS-133** Discovery; Launch: February 24, 2011; Time docked: 8 days 14h	(United States) Steven W. Lindsey (United States) Eric A. Boe (United States) Benjamin A. Drew (United States) Michael R. Barratt (United States) Stephen G. Bowen (United States) Nicole P. Stott		Deliver ELC4 Deliver PMM; Space Shuttle inspection from ISS; 2 spacewalks
61.	26S	**Soyuz TMA-21**; Launch: April 4, 2011; Time docked: ~162 days	(Russia) **Aleksandr Samokutyayev** (Russia) **Andrei Borisenko** (United States) **Ronald J. Garan**		Deliver Expedition 27 crew
62.	ULF6	**STS-134** Endeavour; Launch: May 16, 2011; Time docked: 11 days 18h	(United States) Mark E. Kelly (United States) Gregory H. Johnson (United States) Michael Fincke (United States) Gregory E. Chamitoff (United States) Andrew J. Feustel (Italy) Roberto Vittori		Deliver Alpha Magnetic Spectrometer Deliver ELC3; Space Shuttle inspection from ISS; 4 spacewalks
63.	27S	**Soyuz TMA-02M**; Launch: June 7, 2011; Time docked: ~165 days	(Russia) **Sergey Volkov** (United States) **Michael E. Fossum** (Japan) **Satoshi Furukawa**		Deliver Expedition 28 crew
64.	ULF7	**STS-135** Atlantis; Launch: July 8, 2011; Time docked: 8 days 15h	(United States) Christopher J. Ferguson (United States) Douglas G. Hurley (United States) Sandra H. Magnus (United States) Rex J. Walheim		Use MPLM Space Shuttle inspection from ISS; 1 spacewalk
65.	28S	**Soyuz TMA-22**; Launch: November 14, 2011; Time docked: ~163 days	(Russia) **Anton Shkaplerov** (Russia) **Anatoli Ivanishin** (United States) **Daniel C. Burbank**		Deliver Expedition 29 crew
66.	29S	**Soyuz TMA-03M**; Launch: December 21, 2011; Time docked: ~193 days	(Russia) **Oleg Kononenko** (United States) **Donald R. Pettit** (Netherlands) **André Kuipers**		Deliver Expedition 30 crew
67.	30S	**Soyuz TMA-04M**; Launch: May 15, 2012; Time docked: ~123 days	(Russia) **Gennady Padalka** (Russia) **Sergei Revin** (United States) **Joseph M. Acaba**		Deliver Expedition 31 crew
68.	31S	**Soyuz TMA-05M**; Launch: July 15, 2012; Time docked: ~125 days	(Russia) **Yuri Malenchenko** (United States) **Sunita L. Williams** (Japan) **Akihiko Hoshide**		Deliver Expedition 32 crew
69.	32S	**Soyuz TMA-06M**; Launch: October 23, 2012; Time docked: ~142 days	(Russia) **Oleg Novitskiy** (Russia) **Evgeny Tarelkin** (United States) **Kevin A. Ford**		Deliver Expedition 33 crew
70.	33S	**Soyuz TMA-07M**; Launch: December 19, 2012; Time docked: ~145 days	(Russia) **Roman Romanenko** (United States) **Thomas H. Marshburn** (Canada) **Chris A. Hadfield**		Deliver Expedition 34 crew
71.	34S	**Soyuz TMA-08M**; Launch: March 28, 2013; Time docked: ~166 days	(Russia) **Pavel Vinogradov** (Russia) **Aleksandr Misurkin** (United States) **Christopher J. Cassidy**		Deliver Expedition 35 crew
72.	35S	**Soyuz TMA-09M**; Launch: May 28, 2013; Time docked: ~166 days	(Russia) **Fyodor Yurchikhin** (United States) **Karen L. Nyberg** (Italy) **Luca Parmitano**		Deliver Expedition 36 crew
73.	36S	**Soyuz TMA-10M**; Launch: September 25, 2013; Time docked: ~166 days	(Russia) **Oleg Kotov** (Russia) **Sergey Ryazansky** (United States) **Michael S. Hopkins**		Deliver Expedition 37 crew
74.	37S	**Soyuz TMA-11M**; Launch: November 7, 2013; Time docked: ~187 days	(Russia) **Mikhail Tyurin** (United States) **Richard A. Mastracchio** (Japan) **Koichi Wakata**		Deliver Expedition 38 crew
75.	38S	**Soyuz TMA-12M**; Launch: March 25, 2014; Time docked: ~167 days	(Russia) **Aleksandr Skvortsov** (Russia) **Oleg Artemyev** (United States) **Steven R. Swanson**		Deliver Expedition 39 crew
76.	39S	**Soyuz TMA-13M**; Launch: May 28, 2014; Time docked: ~165 days	(Russia) **Maksim Surayev** (United States) **Reid Wiseman** (Germany) **Alexander Gerst**		Deliver Expedition 40 crew
77.	40S	**Soyuz TMA-14M**; Launch: September 25, 2014; Time docked: ~166 days	(Russia) **Aleksandr Samokutyayev** (Russia) **Yelena Serova** (United States) **Barry E. Wilmore**		Deliver Expedition 41 crew
78.	41S	**Soyuz TMA-15M**; Launch: November 23, 2014; Time docked: ~199 days	(Russia) **Anton Shkaplerov** (Italy) **Samantha Cristoforetti** (United States) **Terry W. Virts**		Deliver Expedition 42 crew
79.	42S	**Soyuz TMA-16M**; Launch: 27 March 2015; Time docked: ~168 days	(Russia) **Gennady Padalka** (Russia) **Mikhail Korniyenko** (United States) **Scott J. Kelly**		Deliver Expedition 43 crew. Korniyenko and Kelly returned on Soyuz TMA-18M after a year-long stay on ISS.
80.	43S	**Soyuz TMA-17M**; Launch: 22 July 2015; Time docked: ~141 days	(Russia) **Oleg Kononenko** (Japan) **Kimiya Yui** (United States) **Kjell N. Lindgren**		Deliver Expedition 44 crew.
81.	44S	**Soyuz TMA-18M**; Launch: 2 September 2015; Time docked: ~180 days	(Russia) **Sergey Volkov** (Denmark) Andreas Mogensen (Kazakhstan) Aidyn Aimbetov		Deliver Expedition 45 crew. Mogensen and Aimbetov returned with the Expedition 44 crew on Soyuz TMA-16M a few days later.
82.	45S	**Soyuz TMA-19M**; Launch: 15 December 2015; Time docked: ~185 days	(Russia) **Yuri Malenchenko** **(United Kingdom) Timothy Peake** **(United States) Timothy L. Kopra**		Deliver Expedition 46 crew
83.	46S	**Soyuz TMA-20M**; Launch: 18 March 2016; Time docked: ~171 days	(Russia) **Aleksey Ovchinin** (Russia) **Oleg Skripochka** (United States) **Jeffrey N. Williams**		Deliver Expedition 47 crew Final TMA-M flight
84.	47S	**Soyuz MS-01**; Launch: 7 July 2016; Time docked: ~113 days	(Russia) **Anatoli Ivanishin** (Japan) **Takuya Onishi** (United States) **Kathleen Rubins**		Deliver Expedition 48 crew First Soyuz MS flight
85.	48S	**Soyuz MS-02**; Launch: 19 October 2016; Time docked: ~171 days	(Russia) **Sergey N. Ryzhikov** (Russia) **Andrei Borisenko** (United States) **Robert S. Kimbrough**		Deliver Expedition 49 crew
86.	49S	**Soyuz MS-03**; Launch: 17 November 2016; Time docked: ~194 days	(Russia) **Oleg Novitskiy** (France) **Thomas Pesquet** (United States) **Peggy Whitson**		Deliver Expedition 50 crew. Whitson returned on Soyuz MS-04 after a ten-month mission
87.	50S	**Soyuz MS-04**; Launch: 20 April 2017; Time docked: ~135 days	(Russia) **Fyodor Yurchikhin** (United States) **Jack D. Fischer**		Deliver Expedition 51 crew
88.	51S	**Soyuz MS-05**; Launch: 28 July 2017; Time docked: ~139 days	(Russia) **Sergey Ryazansky** (United States) **Randy Bresnik** (Italy) **Paolo Nespoli**		Deliver Expedition 52 crew
89.	52S	**Soyuz MS-06**; Launch: 12 September 2017; Time docked: ~168 days	(Russia) **Alexander Misurkin** (United States) **Mark Vande Hei** (United States) **Joseph Acaba**		Deliver Expedition 53 crew
90.	53S	**Soyuz MS-07**; Launch: 17 December 2017; Time docked: ~166 days	(Russia) **Anton Shkaplerov** (Japan) **Norishige Kanai** (United States) **Scott D. Tingle**		Deliver Expedition 54 crew
91.	54S	**Soyuz MS-08**; Launch: 21 March 2018; Time docked: ~194 days	(Russia) **Oleg Artemyev** (United States) **Andrew J. Feustel** (United States) **Richard R. Arnold**		Deliver Expedition 55 crew
92.	55S	**Soyuz MS-09**; Launch: 6 June 2018; Time docked: ~194 days	(Russia) **Sergey Prokopyev** (Germany) **Alexander Gerst** (United States) **Serena M. Auñón-Chancellor**		Deliver Expedition 56 crew
94.	57S	**Soyuz MS-11**; Launch: 3 December 2018; Time docked: ~203 days	(Russia) **Oleg Kononenko** (United States) **Anne McClain** (Canada) **David Saint-Jacques**		Deliver Expedition 57 crew
95.	58S	**Soyuz MS-12**; Launch: 14 March 2019; Time docked: ~202 days	(Russia) **Aleksey Ovchinin** (United States) **Nick Hague** (United States) **Christina Koch**		Deliver Expedition 59 crew, Koch returned onboard Soyuz MS-13 after a nine-month mission.
96.	59S	**Soyuz MS-13**; Launch: 20 July 2019; Time docked: ~201 days	(Russia) **Aleksandr Skvortsov** (Italy) **Luca Parmitano** (United States) **Andrew Morgan**	Soyuz MS-11 backup crew in front of the Soyuz spacecraft mockup	Deliver Expedition 60 crew, Morgan returned on board Soyuz MS-15 after a nine-month mission, and Koch filled his seat for the return trip, after completing a nine-month mission.
97.	61S	**Soyuz MS-15**; Launch: 25 September 2019; Time docked: ~204 days	(Russia) **Oleg Skripochka**; (United States) **Jessica Meir**; (United Arab Emirates) Hazza Al Mansouri		Deliver Expedition 61 crew; Al Mansouri returned to Earth with the departing Soyuz MS-12 capsule. Morgan took Al Mansouri's seat on the MS-15 return flight after a nine-month mission.
98.	62S	**Soyuz MS-16**; Launch: 9 April 2020; Time docked: ~195 days	(Russia) **Anatoli Ivanishin**; (Russia) **Ivan Vagner**; (United States) **Christopher Cassidy**		Deliver 3 members of the Expedition 62 crew
99.	TBA	**SpaceX Demo-2** Launch: 30 May 2020 Time docked: ~62 days	(United States) **Douglas G. Hurley**; (United States) **Robert L. Behnken**		Crewed test flight of the SpaceX Dragon 2 spacecraft. Both members take part in Expedition 63.
100.	63S	**Soyuz MS-17**; Launch: 14 October 2020 Time docked: ~185 days	(Russia) **Sergey Ryzhikov**; (Russia) **Sergey Kud-Sverchkov**; (United States) **Kathleen Rubins**		Deliver 3 members of the Expedition 63 crew.
101.	TBA	**SpaceX Crew-1** Launch: 16 November 2020 Time docked: ~165 days	(United States) **Michael S. Hopkins**; (United States) **Victor Glover**; (Japan) **Soichi Noguchi**; (United States) **Shannon Walker**		Deliver 4 astronauts to the ISS for a six-month flight, members of the Expedition 64 crew; first operational flight of Crew Dragon.
102.	64S	**Soyuz MS-18**; Launch: 9 April 2021 Time docked: ~191 days	(Russia) **Oleg Novitsky**; (Russia) **Pyotr Dubrov**; (United States) **Mark T. Vande Hei**		Deliver 3 members of the Expedition 65 crew. Vande Hei and Dubrov returned onboard Soyuz MS-19 after a year-long mission.
103.	TBA	**SpaceX Crew-2** Launch: 23 April 2021 Time docked: ~199 days	(United States) **Shane Kimbrough**; (United States) **Megan McArthur**; (Japan) **Akihiko Hoshide**; (France) **Thomas Pesquet**		Deliver 4 astronauts to the ISS for a six-month flight, members of the Expedition 65 crew; second operational flight of Crew Dragon.
104.	65S	**Soyuz MS-19**; Launch: 5 October 2021 Time docked: ~176 days	(Russia) **Anton Shkaplerov**; (Russia) Klim Shipenko; (Russia) Yulia Peresild		Deliver 1 Russian cosmonaut, who was also a part of Expedition 65/66 crew, and 2 spaceflight participants on a movie project, The Challenge (Vyzov).
105.	TBA	**SpaceX Crew-3** Launch: 11 November 2021 Time docked: ~174 days	(United States) **Raja Chari**; (United States) **Thomas Marshburn**; (Germany) **Matthias Maurer**; (United States) **Kayla Barron**		Deliver 4 astronauts to the ISS for a six-month flight, members of the Expedition 66 crew; fourth operational flight of Crew Dragon.
106.	66S	**Soyuz MS-20**; Launch: 8 December 2021 Time docked: ~12 days	(Russia) Aleksandr Misurkin; (Japan) Yusaku Maezawa; (Japan) Yozo Hirano		Deliver 1 Russian cosmonaut and 2 Japanese space tourists for a short duration flight.
107.	67S	**Soyuz MS-21**; Launch: 18 March 2022 Time docked: ~195 days	(Russia) **Oleg Artemyev**; (Russia) **Denis Matveev**; (Russia) **Sergey Korsakov**		Deliver 3 members for an Expedition.
108.	TBA	**Ax-1**; Launch: 8 April 2022 Time docked: ~16 days	(United States) / (Spain) Michael López-Alegría; (United States) Larry Connor; (Canada) Mark Pathy; (Israel) Eytan Stibbe		Deliver 1 astronaut and 3 space tourists to the ISS for a ten-day flight; fifth operational flight of Crew Dragon.
109.	TBA	**SpaceX Crew-4** Launch: 27 April 2022 Time docked: ~170 days	(United States) **Kjell Lindgren**; (United States) **Robert Hines**; (Italy) **Samantha Cristoforetti**; (United States) **Jessica Watkins**		Deliver 4 astronauts to the ISS for a six-month flight; sixth operational flight of Crew Dragon.
110.	68S	**Soyuz MS-22**; Launch: 21 September 2022 Time docked: ~188 days	(Russia) **Sergey Prokopyev**; (Russia) **Dmitry Petelin**; (United States) **Francisco Rubio**		Deliver 3 members for an Expedition. Launched crewed, landed uncrewed. Crew were returned by uncrewed Soyuz MS-23.
111.	TBA	SpaceX Crew-5 Launch: 5 October 2022 Time docked: ~155 days	(United States) **Nicole Aunapu Mann**; (United States) **Josh A. Cassada**; (Japan) **Koichi Wakata**; (Russia) **Anna Kikina**		Deliver 4 astronauts to the ISS for a six-month flight; seventh operational flight of Crew Dragon.
113.	TBA	**SpaceX Crew-6** Launch: 2 March 2023 Time docked: ~184 days	(United States) **Stephen Bowen**; (United States) **Warren Hoburg**; (United Arab Emirates) **Sultan Al Neyadi**; (Russia) **Andrey Fedyaev**		Deliver 4 astronauts to the ISS for a six-month flight; eighth operational flight of Crew Dragon.
114.	TBA	**Ax-2**; Launch: 21 May 2023 Time docked: ~8 days	(United States) Peggy Whitson; (United States) John Shoffner; (Saudi Arabia) Ali AlQarni; (Saudi Arabia) Rayyanah Barnawi		Deliver 3 astronauts and 1 space tourist to the ISS for a ten-day flight; ninth operational flight of Crew Dragon.
116.	TBA	**SpaceX Crew-7** Launch: 26 August 2023 Time docked: ~197 days	(United States) **Jasmin Moghbeli**; (Denmark) **Andreas Mogensen**; (Japan) **Satoshi Furukawa**; (Russia) **Konstantin Borisov**		Deliver 4 astronauts to the ISS for a six-month flight; tenth operational flight of Crew Dragon.
117.	70S	**Soyuz MS-24**; Launch: 15 September 2023 Time docked: ~204 days	(Russia) **Oleg Kononenko**; (Russia) **Nikolai Chub**; (United States) **Loral O'Hara**		Deliver 3 astronauts to the ISS for a six-month flight. Kononenko and Chub returned onboard Soyuz MS-25 after a year-long mission.
118.	TBA	**Ax-3**; Launch: 18 January 2024 Time docked: ~18 days	(United States) / (Spain) Michael López-Alegría; (Italy) Walter Villadei; (Turkey) Alper Gezeravcı; (Sweden) Marcus Wandt		Short missions to ISS
119.	TBA	**SpaceX Crew-8** Launch: 4 March 2024 Time docked: ~232 days	(United States) **Matthew Dominick**; (United States) **Michael Barratt**; (United States) **Jeanette Epps**; (Russia) **Alexander Grebenkin**		Deliver 4 astronauts to the ISS for an eight-month flight; eleventh operational flight of Crew Dragon.
120.	71S	**Soyuz MS-25**; Launch: 23 March 2024 Time docked: ~182 days	(Russia) Oleg Novitsky; (Belarus) Marina Vasilevskaya; (United States) **Tracy Caldwell Dyson**		Deliver 1 astronaut to the ISS for a six-month flight. Oleg Novitsky and Belarusian cosmonaut Marina Vasilevskaya returned to Earth after 13 days onboard Soyuz MS-24.
121.	TBA	**Boeing Crew Flight Test**; Launch: 5 June 2024 Time docked: ~92 days	(United States) **Barry E. Wilmore**; (United States) **Sunita Williams**		Crewed test flight of Boeing Starliner spacecraft. Launched crewed, landed uncrewed. Crew returned on SpaceX Crew-9.
122.	72S	**Soyuz MS-26**; Launch: 11 September 2024 Time docked: ~220 days	(Russia) **Aleksey Ovchinin**; (Russia) **Ivan Vagner**; (United States) **Donald R. Pettit**		Deliver 3 astronauts to the ISS for a six-month flight.
123.	TBA	**SpaceX Crew-9** Launch: 28 September 2024 Time docked: ~169 days	(United States) **Nick Hague**; (Russia) **Aleksandr Gorbunov**		Deliver 2 astronauts to the ISS for a six-month flight with return including the 2 astronauts from the aborted Boeing Crew Flight Test; fourteenth operational flight of Crew Dragon.
124.	TBA	**SpaceX Crew-10** Launch: 14 March 2025 Time docked: ~146 days	(United States) **Anne McClain**; (United States) **Nichole Ayers**; (Japan) **Takuya Onishi**; (Russia) **Kirill Peskov**		Deliver 4 astronauts to the ISS for a six-month flight; fifteenth operational flight of Crew Dragon.
125.	73S	**Soyuz MS-27**; Launch: 8 April 2025 Time docked: ~245 days	(Russia) **Sergey Ryzhikov**; (Russia) **Alexey Zubritsky**; (United States) **Jonny Kim**		Deliver 3 astronauts to the ISS for an eight-month flight.
126.	TBA	**Ax-4**; Launch: 25 June 2025 Time docked: ~18 days	(United States) Peggy Whitson; (India) Shubhanshu Shukla; (Poland) Sławosz Uznański-Wiśniewski; (Hungary) Tibor Kapu		Short missions to the ISS.
127.	TBA	**SpaceX Crew-11** Launch: 1 August 2025 Time docked: ~165 days	(United States) **Zena Cardman**; (United States) **Michael Fincke**; (Japan) **Kimiya Yui**; (Russia) **Oleg Platonov**		Deliver 4 astronauts to the ISS for a six-month flight; eighteenth operational flight of Crew Dragon.
128.	74S	**Soyuz MS-28**; Launch: 27 November 2025 Timed docked: ~241 days	(Russia) **Sergey Kud-Sverchkov**; (Russia) **Sergey Mikayev**; (United States) **Christopher Williams**		Deliver 3 astronauts to the ISS for an eight-month flight.
129.	TBA	**SpaceX Crew-12** Launch: 13 February 2026 Timed docked: ~235 days	(United States) **Jessica Meir**; (United States) **Jack Hathaway**; (France) **Sophie Adenot**; (Russia) **Andrey Fedyaev**		Deliver 4 astronauts to the ISS for a six-month flight; nineteenth operational flight of Crew Dragon.

== Current ==
	ISS flight	Mission	Crew	Crew photo	Notes
130.	75S	**Soyuz MS-29**; Launch: 14 July 2026	(Russia) **Pyotr Dubrov** (Note: Current ISS commander.); (Russia) **Anna Kikina**; (United States) **Anil Menon**		Deliver 3 astronauts to the ISS for an eight-month flight.
131.	TBA	**SpaceX Crew-13** Launch: 1 October 2026	(United States) **Jessica Watkins**; (United States) **Luke Delaney**; (Canada) **Joshua Kutryk**; (Russia) **Sergey Teteryatnikov**		Deliver 4 astronauts to the ISS for a six-month flight; twentieth operational flight of Crew Dragon.

== Future ==
	ISS flight	Mission	Crew	Crew photo	Notes
132.	TBA	**Ax-5**; Launch: January 2027	TBA; TBA; TBA; TBA		Deliver 4 private astronauts to the ISS for a two-week flight.
133.	TBA	**SpaceX Crew-14** Launch: 1 March 2027	(United States) **Kayla Barron**; (United States) **Christina Birch**; (Japan) **Makoto Suwa**; (Russia) **Harutyun Kiviryan**		Deliver 4 astronauts to the ISS for a six-month flight; twenty-second operational flight of Crew Dragon.
134.	76S	**Soyuz MS-30**; Launch: 24 March 2027	(Russia) **Dmitry Petelin**; (Russia) **Konstantin Borisov**; (United States) **Deniz Burnham**		Deliver 3 astronauts to the ISS for an eight-month flight.
135.	TBA	**Vast-PAM-1**; Launch: July 2027	(France) Thomas Pesquet; (Czech Republic) Aleš Svoboda; (Greece) Adrianos Golemis; TBA		Deliver 1 professional astronaut and 3 private astronauts to the ISS for a two-week flight.
136.	TBA	**VOYG-1**; Launch: 2028	TBA; TBA; TBA; TBA		Deliver 4 private astronauts to the ISS for a two-week flight.

== Replacement/Rescue ==
	ISS flight	Mission	Crew	Crew photo	Notes
112.	69S	**Soyuz MS-23**; Launch: 24 February 2023; Time docked: 215 days	(Russia) **Sergey Prokopyev**; (Russia) **Dmitry Petelin**; (United States) **Francisco Rubio**		Launched uncrewed but landed with Soyuz MS-22 crew. Their spacecraft was deemed unfit for landing and thus was returned uncrewed and Soyuz MS-23 launched as its replacement. The cause was a 0.8 mm-diameter (0.031 in) hole punctured in the radiator of Soyuz MS-22 due to micro-meteorite impact. All coolant in the radiator leaked out.

== Failed ==
	ISS flight	Mission	Crew	Crew photo	Notes
93.	56S	**Soyuz MS-10**; Launch: October 2018 Time docked: Aborted after launch failure	(Russia) **Aleksey Ovchinin**; (United States) **Nick Hague**		Failed launch while detaching boosters leading to an abort. The crew performed a ballistic reentry.

== See also ==
- Assembly of the International Space Station
- International Space Station
- List of commanders of the ISS
- List of human spaceflights to Mir
- List of International Space Station crew
- List of International Space Station spacewalks
- List of International Space Station visitors
- List of Progress flights
- Mir
- Uncrewed spaceflights to the International Space Station
