= Soyuz MS =

Latest revision of the Soyuz spacecraft

Soyuz MS Союз МС
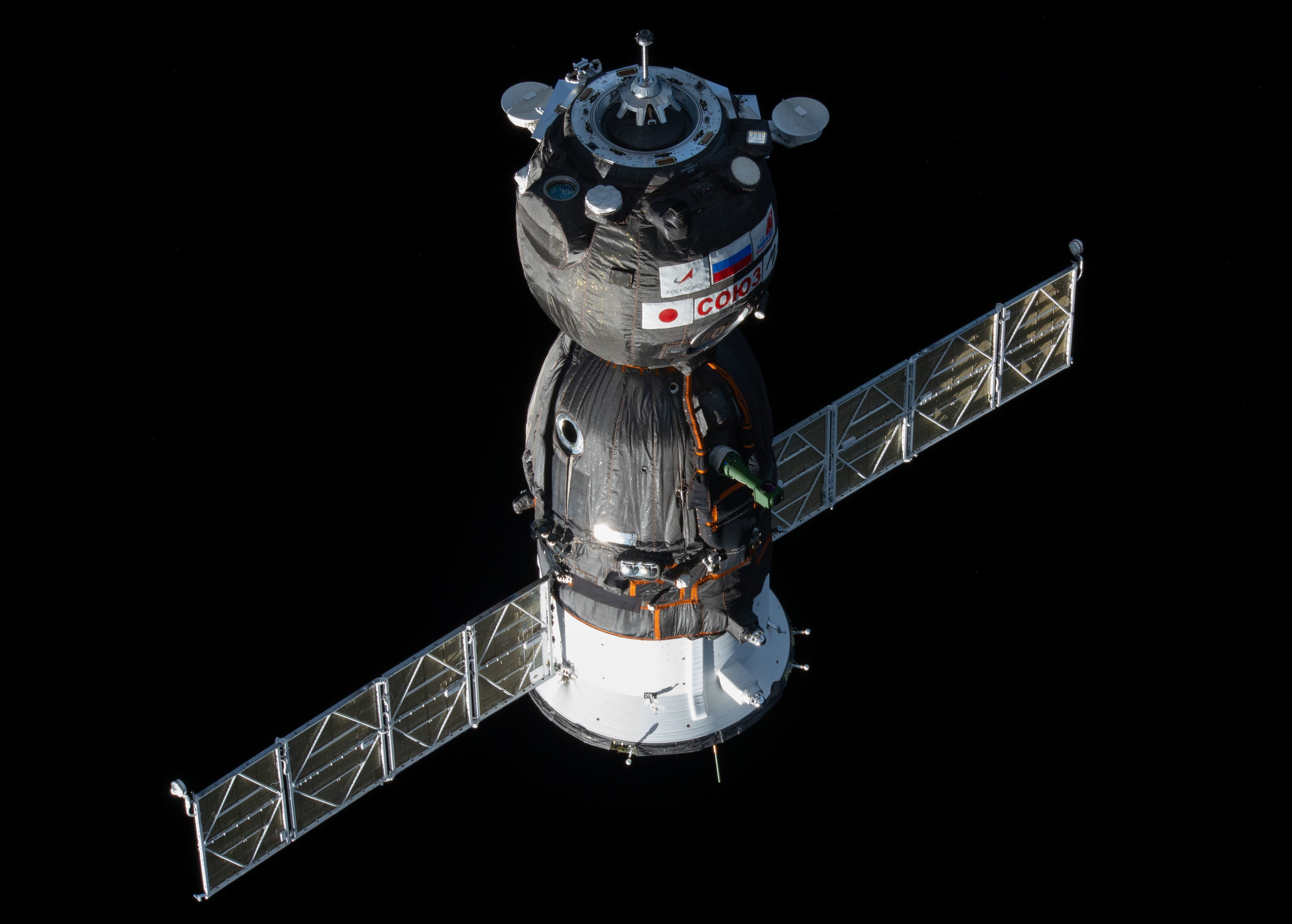
- Soyuz MS-20 approaching the ISS
- Manufacturer: Energia
- Country of origin: Russia
- Operator: Roscosmos

Specifications
- Spacecraft type: Human spaceflight
- Launch mass: 7,290 kg (16,070 lb)
- Payload capacity: Launch: Crew + 170 kg (370 lb); Landing: Crew + 60 kg (130 lb); Disposal: 170 kg (370 lb)
- Crew capacity: 3
- Volume: Total: 10 m^{3} (350 cu ft); Descent module: 4 m^{3} (140 cu ft); Orbital module: 6 m^{3} (210 cu ft)
- Batteries: 755 Ah
- Regime: Low Earth orbit
- Design life: 240 days when docked to the International Space Station (ISS)

Dimensions
- Solar array span: 10.7 m (35 ft)
- Width: 2.72 m (8 ft 11 in)

Production
- Status: Active
- On order: 3
- Built: 29
- Launched: 29 (as of 14 July 2026)
- Operational: 1 (MS-29)
- Retired: 27
- Failed: 1 (MS-10)
- Maiden launch: 7 July 2016 (MS-01)
- Last launch: Active

Related spacecraft
- Derived from: Soyuz TMA-M
- Flown with: Progress MS (cargo version)
- Launch vehicle: Soyuz FG (2016–2019); Soyuz 2.1a (2020–)

The Soyuz MS (Russian: Союз МС; GRAU: 11F732A48) is the latest version of the Russian Soyuz spacecraft series, first launched in 2016. The "MS" stands for "modernized systems," referring to improvements in navigation, communications, and onboard systems over the Soyuz TMA-M series. Developed and manufactured by Energia, it is operated by Roscosmos for human spaceflight missions to the International Space Station (ISS).

Soyuz MS-01, the first flight of the series, launched on 7 July 2016 and docked with the ISS two days later following a checkout phase to validate the new systems. The mission lasted 113 days, concluding with a landing on the Kazakh Steppe on 30 October 2016.

The Soyuz MS spacecraft has been involved in one in-flight abort. During the launch of Soyuz MS-10 in October 2018, a booster separation failure on the Soyuz-FG launch vehicle triggered the automated launch escape system. The spacecraft separated from the rocket and returned the crew safely to Earth under parachutes. The crew landed unharmed. Since April 2020, the spacecraft has been launched using the modernized Soyuz 2.1a rocket.

== Design ==
Exploded plan of the Soyuz MS spacecraft and Soyuz FG rocket

Like earlier versions of the Soyuz, the MS spacecraft variant consists of three sections (from forward to aft in orbit, or top to bottom when mounted on a rocket):

- A spheroid orbital module
- A small aerodynamic descent module
- A cylindrical instrumentation and propulsion module

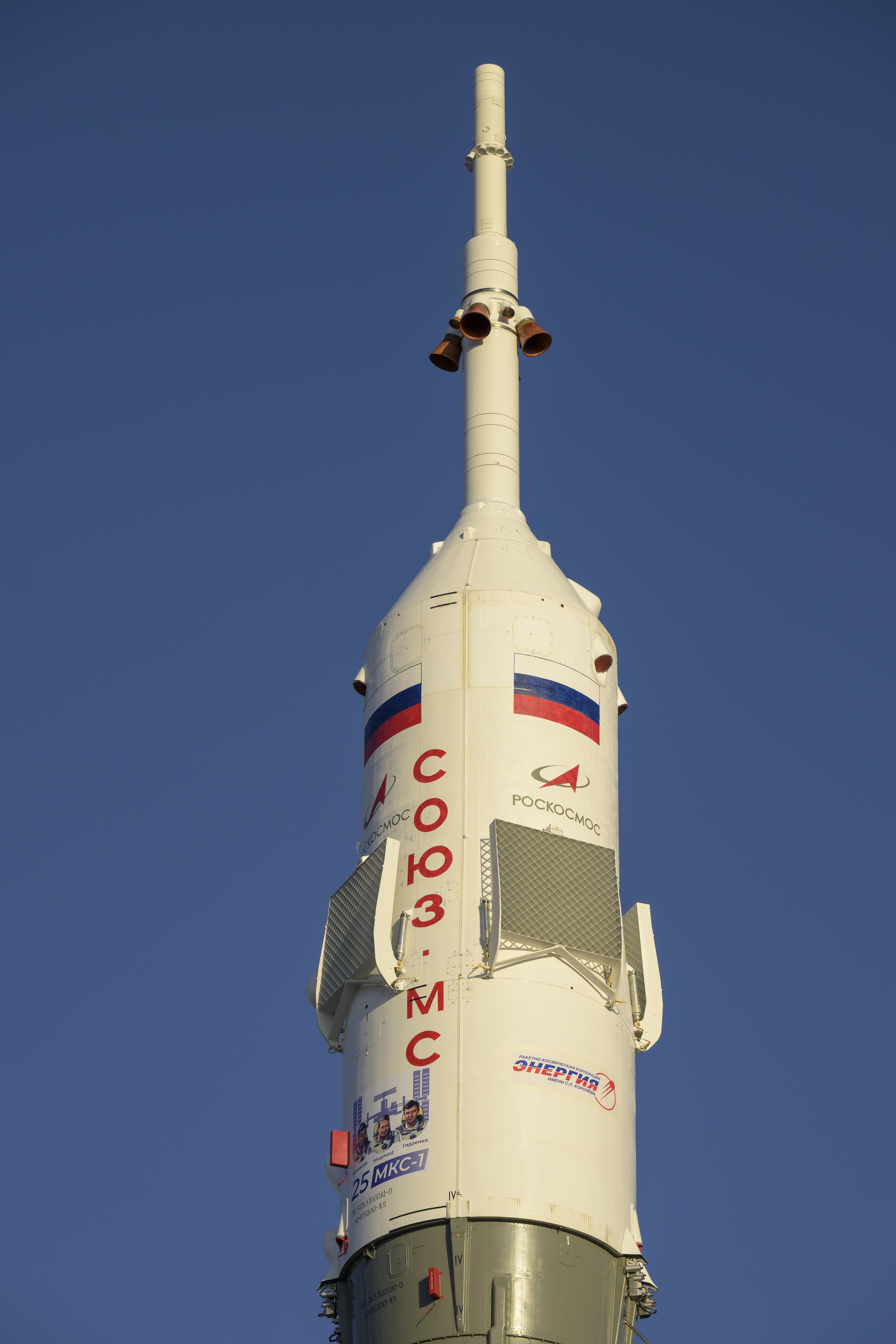
Upper stage of the Soyuz MS-28 mission.

The orbital and descent modules are pressurized and habitable. By relocating much of the equipment and usable volume to the orbital module—which does not require heat shielding for atmospheric re-entry—the three-part Soyuz design is both larger and lighter than comparable two-part spacecraft. For comparison, the Apollo spacecraft's pressurized command module provided a crew of three with six cubic metres (210 cu ft) of living space and had a re-entry mass of approximately 5,000 kilograms (11,000 lb), while the Soyuz MS offers the same crew ten cubic metres (350 cu ft) of living space with a re-entry module mass of about 2,950 kilograms (6,500 lb).

The Soyuz MS can carry up to three crew members and supports free-flight missions lasting approximately 30 person-days. Its life support system provides a nitrogen–oxygen atmosphere similar to that of Earth, with air pressure equivalent to sea level. Oxygen is regenerated using potassium superoxide (KO_{2}) canisters, which absorb most of the carbon dioxide (CO_{2}) and water exhaled by the crew and release oxygen. Lithium hydroxide (LiOH) canisters are also used to absorb residual CO_{2}.

In addition to the crew, Soyuz MS can carry up to 200 kilograms (440 lb) of payload to orbit and return up to 65 kilograms (143 lb) to Earth.

The spacecraft is protected during launch by a nose fairing with a launch escape system, which is jettisoned once the vehicle exits the dense layers of the atmosphere. Soyuz MS is highly automated; its Kurs system enables automatic rendezvous and docking with the ISS. Manual control is possible in the event of system failure.

=== Orbital module ===
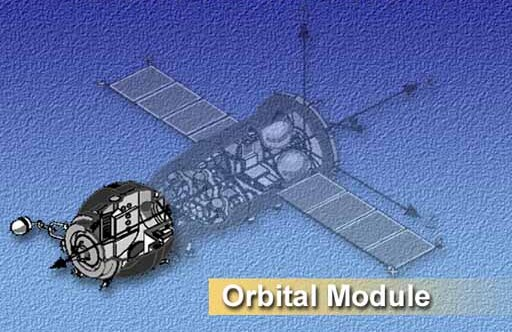
Drawing highlighting the orbital module

The forward-most section of the spacecraft is the orbital module (Russian: Бытовой отсек (БО), romanized: Bitovoy Otsek (BO), or habitation module). It provides more living space than the descent module and includes a toilet.

It has three hatches: a forward hatch for docking with the ISS, a side hatch for crew ingress and egress during ground operations, and an aft hatch connecting to the descent module. In principle, the side hatch could be used for spacewalks by sealing the other hatches and using the module as an airlock, although this capability has never been used on the MS variant due to the availability of larger dedicated airlocks on the ISS.

In microgravity, the orbital module's conceptual orientation differs from that of the reentry module, with crew members positioned with their heads toward the forward docking port.

The module has a small forward-facing window which can be used during manual docking if the automated system fails. A crew member observes the approach from this window and relays information to the commander, who pilots the spacecraft from the reentry module using a periscope mounted on the midsection of the spacecraft.

The module can accommodate over 100 kilograms (220 lb) of cargo at launch and is typically filled with up to 170 kilograms (370 lb) of waste before being jettisoned prior to re-entry where it will burn up in the atmosphere.

The orbital module can be customized for specific mission requirements without affecting the safety-critical systems of the descent module. Compared to earlier Soyuz versions, it incorporates additional anti-meteoroid shielding.

=== Descent module ===
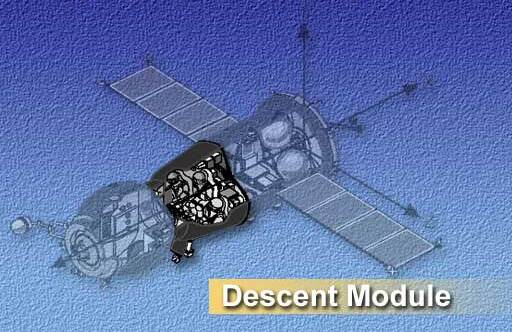
Drawing highlighting the descent module

The central section is the descent module (Russian: Спускаемый аппарат (СА), romanized: Spuskaemiy Apparat (SA)), which houses the crew during launch and return. During re-entry it is shielded by a heat-resistant covering and slowed using atmospheric drag and parachutes. At one metre (3 ft 3 in) above ground, solid-fuel landing engines behind the heat shield fire to cushion the final impact.

The reentry module is designed for high volumetric efficiency (internal volume relative to hull surface area). A spherical shape would be optimal but offers no lift, resulting in a fully ballistic reentry, which is difficult to steer and subjects the crew to high g-forces. Instead, the Soyuz uses a compromise "headlight" shape: a hemispherical forward section, a shallow conical midsection, and a spherical heat shield, allowing limited lift and steering. The nickname derives from the resemblance to early sealed beam automotive headlights.

=== Instrumentation/propulsion module ===
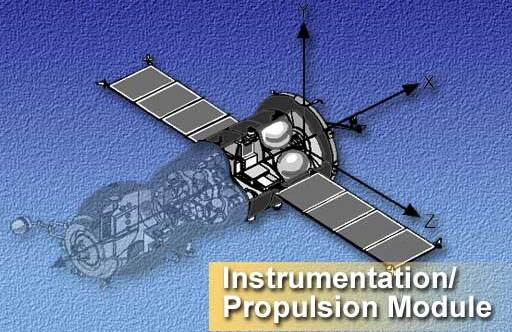
Drawing highlighting the instrumentation/propulsion module

The aft section is the instrumentation/propulsion module (Russian: Приборно-Агрегатный Отсек [ПАО], romanized: Priborniy-Agregatniy Otsek [PAO]), also referred to as the service module or aggregate compartment. It consists of three parts: the instrumentation compartment (Russian: Приборно Отсек [ПО], romanized: Priborniy Otsek [PO]), the instrumentation compartment (Russian: Приборно Отсек [ПО], romanized: Priborniy Otsek [PO]), and the propulsion compartment (Russian: Агрегатный Отсек [АО], romanized: Agregatniy Otsek [AO]).

The instrumentation compartment is a pressurized container housing systems for power generation, thermal control, communications, telemetry, and attitude control. The propulsion compartment contains the main and backup liquid-fueled engines for orbital maneuvers and deorbiting. Low-thrust attitude control thrusters are mounted on the intermediate compartment. Solar panels and orientation sensors are mounted externally on the service module.

=== Re-entry procedure ===
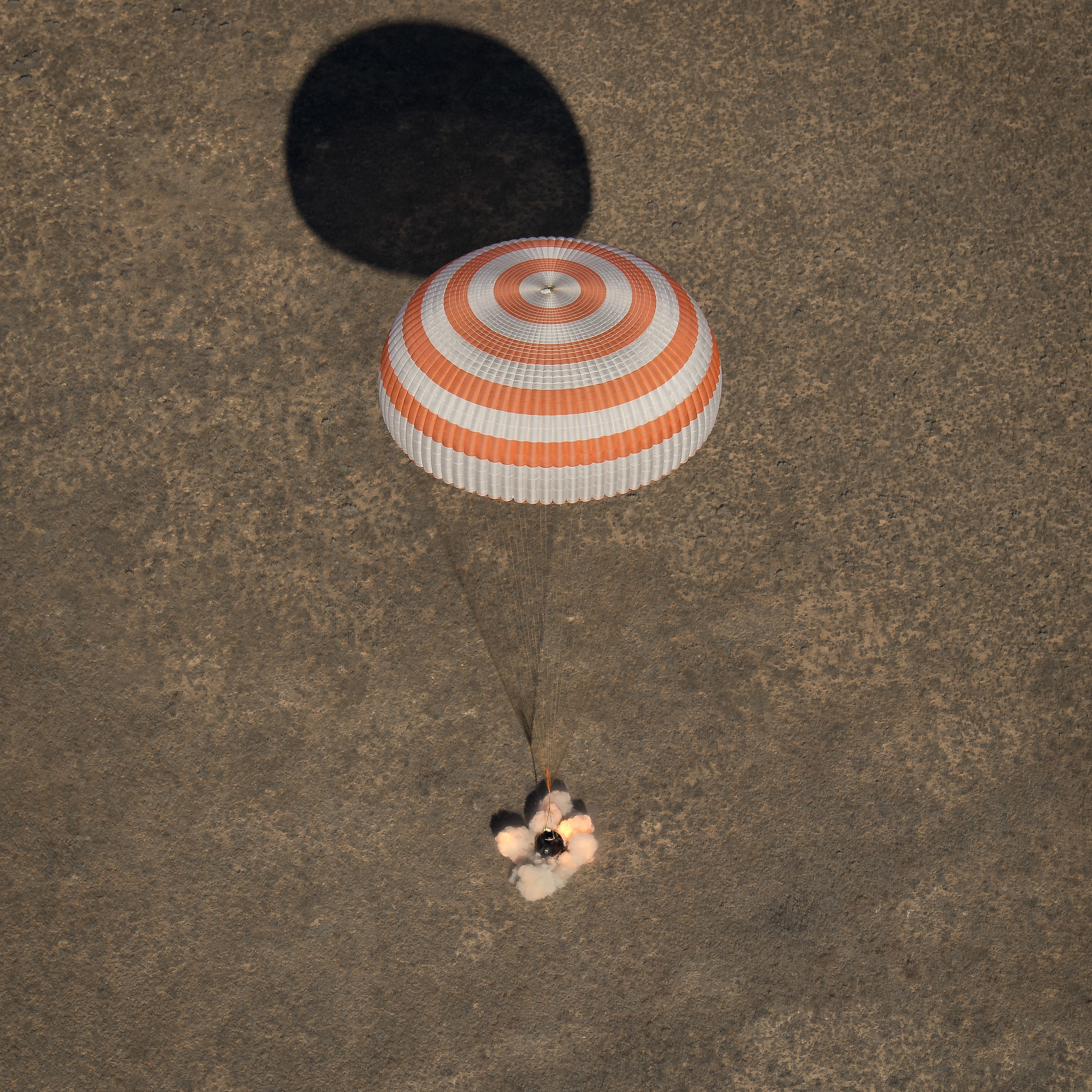
Soyuz MS-02 at the moment of touchdown. The orange glow and dust cloud can be seen around the descent module as the soft-landing engines fire. The spacecraft lands under one main parachute.

The Soyuz spacecraft initiates its return to Earth with a deorbit burn approximately half an orbit, or 180 degrees, ahead of the designated landing site. The spacecraft is oriented tail-first, and the main engine fires for about five minutes to reduce velocity and lower the orbit. This maneuver typically takes place as the vehicle passes over the southern tip of South America at an altitude of about 422 kilometres (262 mi).

About 30 minutes after the deorbit burn, as the spacecraft passes over the Arabian Peninsula at an altitude of roughly 140 kilometres (87 mi), the three modules separate. Only the descent module, which carries the crew, is designed to survive reentry; the orbital and service modules burn up in the atmosphere. To ensure successful separation under all circumstances, the spacecraft uses a four-tiered backup system: two automated commands, a manual override, and an emergency thermal sensor triggered by rising reentry temperatures.

The descent module reenters the atmosphere at an angle of approximately 1.35°, generating some aerodynamic lift to reduce g-forces compared to a purely ballistic trajectory. In the event of flight control or attitude system failure, the capsule can revert to a ballistic descent, and crews are trained to withstand the higher loads associated with it.

At around 100 kilometres (62 mi) altitude, atmospheric drag rapidly decelerates the spacecraft, and reentry heating causes the ablative outer layers of the shield to burn away. Plasma forms around the capsule, temporarily interrupting communications with ground stations. The onboard flight control system can adjust the capsule's roll to fine-tune its trajectory.

Parachute deployment begins at about 10 kilometres (6.2 mi) altitude. Two pilot chutes deploy first, followed by a drogue chute that slows the spacecraft from 230 to 80 metres per second (830 to 290 km/h; 510 to 180 mph), followed by the main parachute which further reduces the descent rate to 7.2 metres per second (26 km/h; 16 mph). At approximately 5.8 kilometres (3.6 mi) altitude, the heat shield is jettisoned, exposing the soft-landing engines, an altimeter, and a beacon light. Cabin pressure is gradually equalized with the outside atmosphere.

At an altitude of about one metre (3 ft 3 in), the altimeter triggers the solid-fuel braking engines, reducing impact speed to under 2 metres per second (7.2 km/h; 4.5 mph). Each seat is equipped with shock absorbers and a liner custom molded to each crew member's body shape to cushion the final impact. In the rare case of a landing under a backup parachute, descent speeds may reach 10.5 metres per second (38 km/h; 23 mph), but the descent module and seating systems are designed to remain survivable.

After touchdown, the main parachute is released to prevent the capsule from being dragged by the wind. The module may land upright or on its side. Recovery beacons and transmitters activate automatically. If needed, the crew can manually deploy additional antennas. The spacecraft's autonomous navigation system (ASN-K) also transmits real-time position data via satellite to assist search and rescue operations.

Soyuz landings are conducted in flat, open areas without major obstacles. Thirteen designated landing zones in Kazakhstan meet these criteria. Mission planners typically schedule landings during the spacecraft's first or second orbit of the day, as it moves from south to north. Most landings occur at twilight, allowing recovery teams to visually track the brightly lit capsule against the darkening sky. Since Soyuz began servicing the ISS, only a few missions have landed at night.

If the descent module lands far from recovery teams, it is equipped with a survival kit. This includes a satellite phone, cold-weather clothing, a medical kit, a strobe light, a handheld radio, a signal mirror, matches and a firestarter, a fishing kit, and a semi-automatic pistol intended for protection against wildlife such as wolves or bears.

== Soyuz MS improvements ==
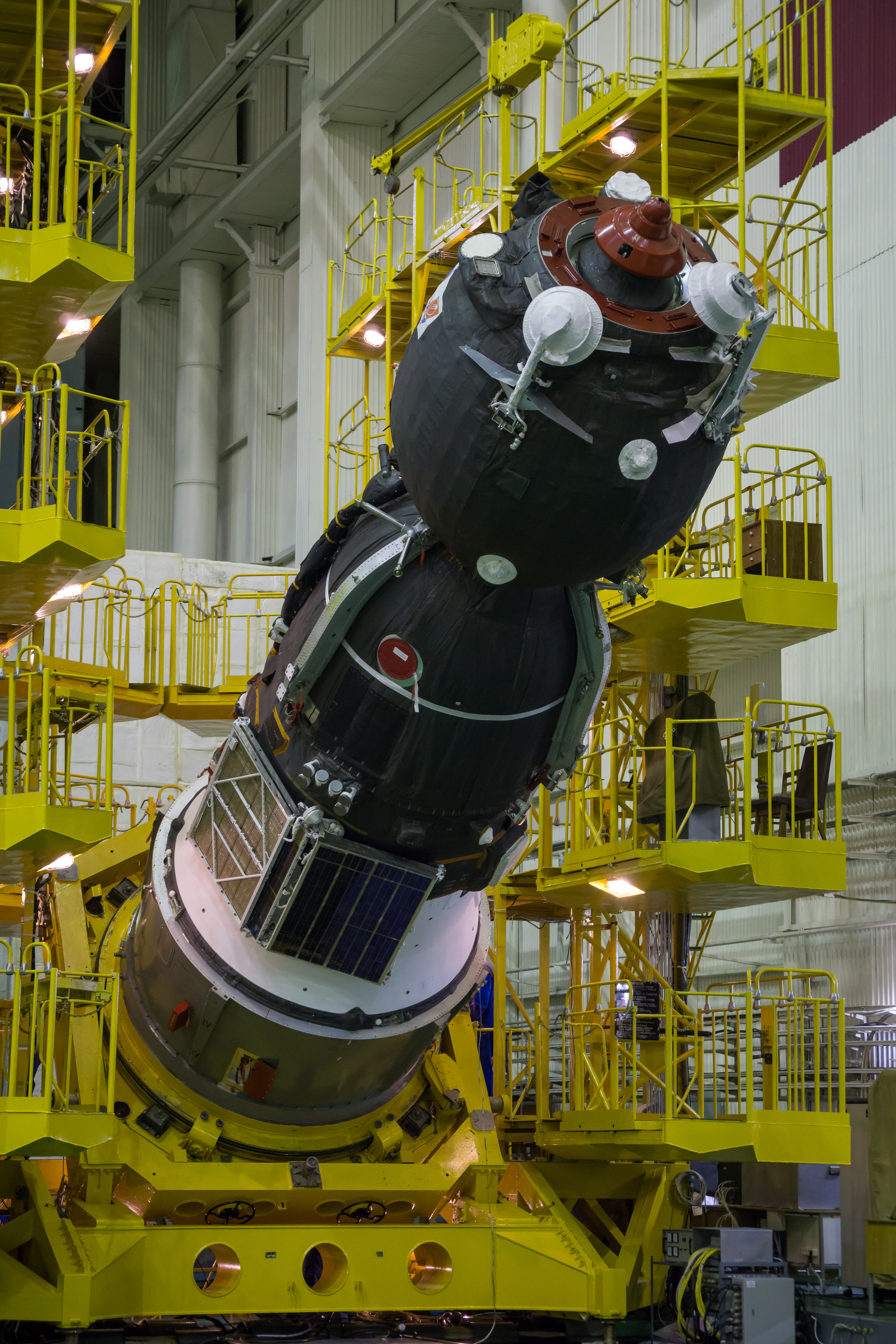
Soyuz MS-02 being prepared for launch in September 2016

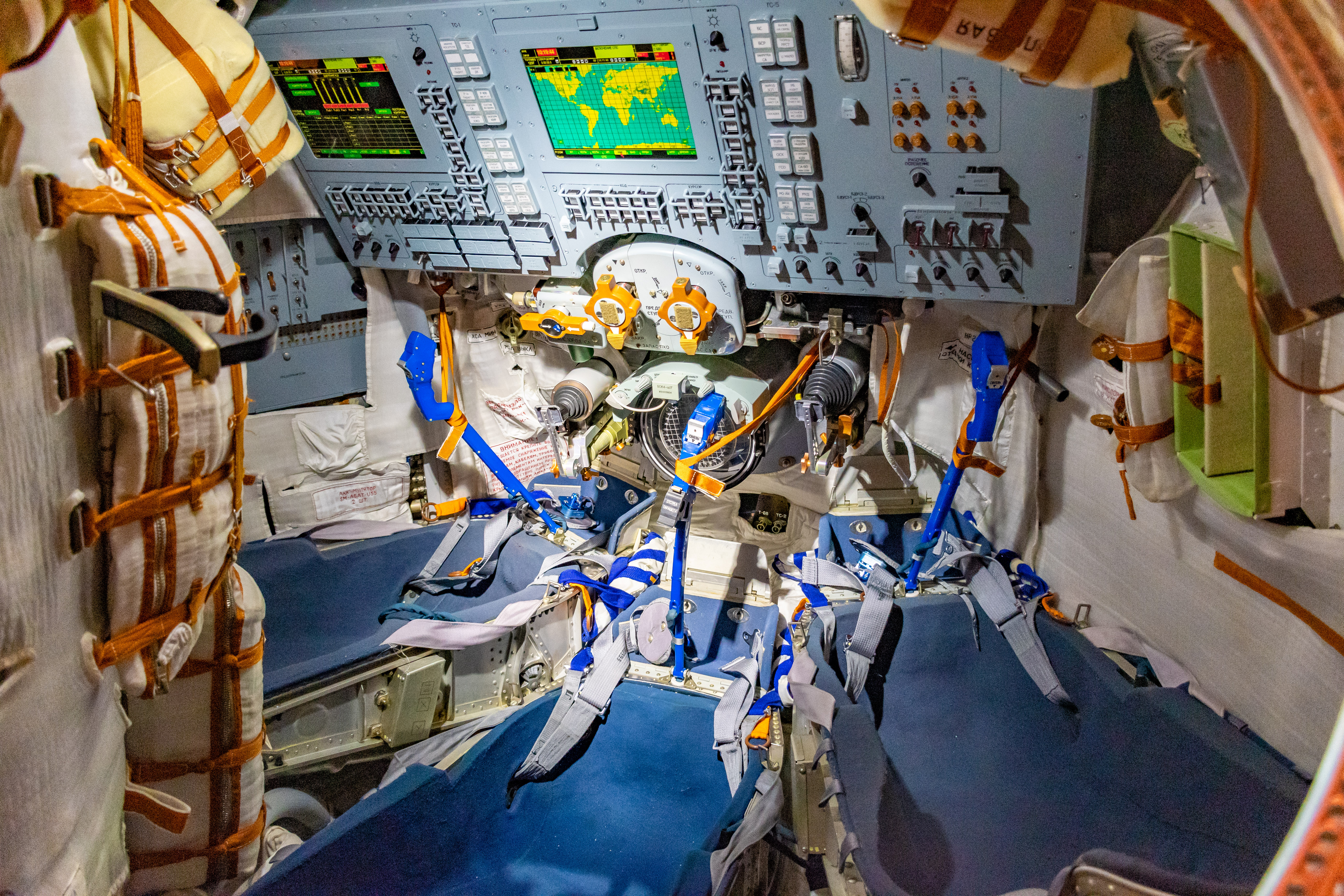
Interior of the Soyuz-MS descent module showing its glass cockpit and three crew couches

The Soyuz MS includes a number of upgrades over the earlier Soyuz TMA-M variant:

- Kurs-NA rendezvous system: The Kurs-NA (Russian: Курс-Новая Активная, romanized: Kurs-Novaya Aktivnaya, meaning "Course–New Active") is an automatic docking system developed and manufactured in Russia to replace the earlier Ukrainian-built Kurs system. The change was driven in part by the need to reduce reliance on Ukrainian hardware following the deterioration of relations and armed conflict between the two countries. It also modernizes the equipment with a higher degree of computerization and addresses the obsolescence of components in the original system. The Kurs-NA is about 25 kg (55 lb) lighter, 30% smaller, and consumes 25% less power than its predecessor. It employs a single phased-array antenna in place of four older antennas, while two narrow-angle antennas were retained but repositioned toward the rear. The system also replaces the halogen headlight used for docking assistance with a brighter, more energy-efficient LED lamp.
- Unified Command and Telemetry System (EKTS, Russian: Единая Командно-Телеметрическая Система, romanized: Edinaya Komandno-Telemetricheskaya Sistema): Replaces earlier systems (BRTS, MBITS, Rassvet) with a single unit that supports satellite communications via Russia's Luch relay network, covering up to 83% of each orbit. It incorporates the Apparatus for Satellite Navigation (ASN-K, Russian: Аппаратура Спутниковой Навигации [АСН-К], romanized: Apparatura Sputnikovoi Navigatsii), which replaces a ground-based tracking network of six stations across Russia that provided only partial orbital coverage. ASN-K uses GLONASS and GPS signals through four fixed antennas, delivering positional accuracy of 5 m (16 ft) and 0.5° attitude accuracy. The spacecraft also retains VHF and UHF radios, can interface with U.S. TDRSS and European EDRS networks, and carries a COSPAS-SARSAT transponder for real-time reentry tracking.
- Reconfigured attitude control thrusters: The Integrated Propulsion System (Russian: Комбинированная Двигательная Установка, romanized: Kombinirovannaya Dvigatelnaya Ustanovka [KDU]) uses two redundant manifold loops to supply fuel and oxidizer to 14 pairs of thrusters. Each pair connects to separate loops for redundancy. The number of aft-facing thrusters is doubled to provide backup for the main engine. The avionics and EFIR fuel-tracking unit are also redesigned to improve reliability.
- Docking mechanism enhancements: The SSVP docking system includes a backup electric drive mechanism.
- SZI-M reusable flight recorder: A ruggedized black box, the SZI-M (Russian: Система Запоминания Информации [СЗИ-М], romanized: Sistema Zapominaniya Informatsii, lit. 'Information Storage System'), is located beneath the commander's seat. It records voice and data throughout the mission, with a 4 GB capacity. It withstands impacts up to 150 m/s (490 ft/s) and temperatures up to 700 °C (1,300 °F) for 30 minutes and is rated for 100,000 overwrite cycles and up to ten reuse missions.
- Power system upgrades: A fifth battery with a capacity of 155 Ah is added to support increased power demands. Solar cell efficiency increases from 12% to 14%, and panel surface area increases by 1.1 m^{2} (12 sq ft).
- Enhanced micrometeoroid protection: Additional shielding is installed on the orbital module, primarily at NASA's request, to reduce vulnerability to space debris and micrometeoroid impacts.
- Digital camera system: The analog video system is replaced with an MPEG-2-based digital video system, enabling space-to-space RF communication with the ISS and reducing signal interference.

== List of flights ==
Mission	Launch Vehicle	Crew		Notes	Duration
Mission	Launch Vehicle	Launch	Landing	Notes	Duration
Completed
Soyuz MS-01	Soyuz-FG	Anatoli Ivanishin; Takuya Onishi; Kathleen Rubins		Delivered Expedition 48/49 crew to ISS. Originally scheduled to ferry the ISS-47/48 crew to ISS, although switched with Soyuz TMA-20M due to delays.	115 days
Soyuz MS-02	Soyuz-FG	Sergey Ryzhikov; Andrey Borisenko; Shane Kimbrough		Delivered Expedition 49/50 crew to ISS. Soyuz MS-02 marked the final Soyuz to carry two Russian crew members until Soyuz MS-16 due to Roscosmos deciding to reduce the Russian crew on the ISS.	173 days
Soyuz MS-03	Soyuz-FG	Oleg Novitsky; Thomas Pesquet; Peggy Whitson	Oleg Novitsky; Thomas Pesquet	Delivered Expedition 50/51 crew to ISS. Whitson landed on Soyuz MS-04 following 289 days in space, breaking the record for the longest single spaceflight for a woman.	196 days
Soyuz MS-04	Soyuz-FG	Fyodor Yurchikhin; Jack D. Fischer	Fyodor Yurchikhin; Jack D. Fischer; Peggy Whitson	Delivered Expedition 51/52 crew to ISS. Crew was reduced to two following a Russian decision to reduce the number of crew members on the Russian Orbital Segment.	136 days
Soyuz MS-05	Soyuz-FG	Sergey Ryazansky; Randolph Bresnik; Paolo Nespoli		Delivered Expedition 52/53 crew to ISS. Nespoli became the first European astronaut to fly two ISS long-duration flights and took the record for the second longest amount of time in space for a European.	139 days
Soyuz MS-06	Soyuz-FG	Alexander Misurkin; Mark T. Vande Hei; Joseph M. Acaba		Delivered Expedition 53/54 crew to ISS. Misurkin and Vande Hei were originally assigned to Soyuz MS-04, although they were pushed back due a change in the ISS flight program, Acaba was added by NASA later.	168 days
Soyuz MS-07	Soyuz-FG	Anton Shkaplerov; Scott D. Tingle; Norishige Kanai		Delivered Expedition 54/55 crew to ISS. The launch was advanced forward in order to avoid it happening during the Christmas holidays, meaning the older two-day rendezvous scheme was needed.	168 days
Soyuz MS-08	Soyuz-FG	Oleg Artemyev; Andrew J. Feustel; Richard R. Arnold		Delivered Expedition 55/56 crew to ISS.	198 days
Soyuz MS-09	Soyuz-FG	Sergey Prokopyev; Alexander Gerst; Serena Auñón-Chancellor		Delivered Expedition 56/57 crew to ISS. In August 2018, a hole was detected in the spacecraft's orbital module. Two cosmonauts did a spacewalk later in the year to inspect it.	197 days
Soyuz MS-10	Soyuz-FG	Aleksey Ovchinin; Nick Hague		Intended to deliver Expedition 57/58 crew to ISS, flight aborted. Both crew members were reassigned to Soyuz MS-12 and flew six months later on 14 March 2019.	19 minutes, 41 seconds
Soyuz MS-11	Soyuz-FG	Oleg Kononenko; David Saint-Jacques; Anne McClain		Delivered Expedition 58/59 crew to ISS, launch was advanced following Soyuz MS-10 in order to avoid de-crewing the ISS.	204 days
Soyuz MS-12	Soyuz-FG	Aleksey Ovchinin; Nick Hague; Christina Koch	Aleksey Ovchinin; Nick Hague; Hazza Al Mansouri	Delivered Expedition 59/60 crew to ISS. Koch landed on Soyuz MS-13 and spent 328 days in space. Her seat was occupied by Hazza Al Mansouri for landing.	203 days
Soyuz MS-13	Soyuz-FG	Aleksandr Skvortsov; Luca Parmitano; Andrew R. Morgan	Aleksandr Skvortsov; Luca Parmitano; Christina Koch	Delivered Expedition 60/61 crew to ISS. Morgan landed on Soyuz MS-15 following 272 days in space. Christina Koch returned in his seat. Her flight broke Peggy Whitson's record for the longest female spaceflight.	201 days
Soyuz MS-14	Soyuz-2.1a	Uncrewed		Uncrewed test flight to validate Soyuz for use on Soyuz 2.1a rocket. The first docking attempt was aborted due to an issue on Poisk. Three days later, the spacecraft successfully docked to Zvezda. After remaining docked for nearly 11 days, the spacecraft undocked and the descent module successfully landed back on Earth.	15 days
Soyuz MS-15	Soyuz-FG	Oleg Skripochka; Jessica Meir; Hazza Al Mansouri	Oleg Skripochka; Jessica Meir; Andrew R. Morgan	Delivered Expedition 61/62/EP-19 crew to ISS. Al Mansouri became the first person from the UAE to fly in space. He landed on Soyuz MS-12 after eight days in space as part of Visiting Expedition 19.	205 days
Soyuz MS-16	Soyuz-2.1a	Anatoli Ivanishin; Ivan Vagner; Christopher Cassidy		Delivered Expedition 62/63 crew to ISS. Nikolai Tikhonov and Andrei Babkin were originally assigned to the flight, although they were pushed back and replaced by Ivanishin and Vagner due to medical issues.	196 days
Soyuz MS-17	Soyuz-2.1a	Sergey Ryzhikov; Sergey Kud-Sverchkov; Kathleen Rubins		Delivered Expedition 63/64 crew to ISS. Marked the first crewed use of the ultra-fast three-hour rendezvous with the ISS previously tested with Progress spacecraft.	185 days
Soyuz MS-18	Soyuz-2.1a	Oleg Novitsky; Pyotr Dubrov; Mark T. Vande Hei	Oleg Novitsky; Klim Shipenko; Yulia Peresild	Delivered Expedition 64/65 crew to the ISS. Dubrov and Vande Hei were transferred to Expedition 66 for a year mission and returned to Earth on Soyuz MS-19 with Anton Shkaplerov after 355 days in space.	191 days
Soyuz MS-19	Soyuz-2.1a	Anton Shkaplerov; Klim Shipenko; Yulia Peresild	Anton Shkaplerov; Pyotr Dubrov; Mark T. Vande Hei	Delivered one Russian cosmonaut for Expedition 65/66 and two spaceflight participants for a movie project called The Challenge. The two spaceflight participants returned to Earth on Soyuz MS-18 with Oleg Novitsky after eleven days in space.	176 days
Soyuz MS-20	Soyuz-2.1a	Alexander Misurkin; Yusaku Maezawa; Yozo Hirano		Delivered one Russian cosmonaut and two Space Adventures tourists to the ISS for EP-20. The crew returned to Earth after twelve days in space as part of Visiting Expedition 20.	12 days
Soyuz MS-21	Soyuz-2.1a	Oleg Artemyev; Denis Matveev; Sergey Korsakov		Delivered three Russian cosmonauts for Expedition 66/67 crew to ISS.	194 days
Soyuz MS-22	Soyuz-2.1a	Sergey Prokopyev; Dmitry Petelin; Francisco Rubio	Uncrewed	Delivered Expedition 67/68 crew to ISS. All three crew members were transferred to Expedition 69 for a year mission due to a coolant leak and returned to Earth on Soyuz MS-23 after 371 days in space.	187 days
Soyuz MS-23	Soyuz-2.1a	Uncrewed	Sergey Prokopyev; Dmitry Petelin; Francisco Rubio	Uncrewed flight to replace the damaged Soyuz MS-22, which returned to Earth uncrewed due to a coolant leak.	215 days
Soyuz MS-24	Soyuz-2.1a	Oleg Kononenko; Nikolai Chub; Loral O'Hara	Oleg Novitsky; Maryna Vasileuskaya; Loral O'Hara	All three crew members were originally planned to fly on Soyuz MS-23, but they were pushed back due to a coolant leak on Soyuz MS-22 that required MS-23 to be launched uncrewed as its replacement. Delivered Expedition 69/70 crew to ISS. Kononenko and Chub were transferred to Expedition 71 for a year mission and returned to Earth on Soyuz MS-25 with Tracy Caldwell Dyson after 374 days in space.	204 days
Soyuz MS-25	Soyuz-2.1a	Oleg Novitsky; Maryna Vasileuskaya; Tracy Caldwell Dyson	Oleg Kononenko; Nikolai Chub; Tracy Caldwell Dyson	Delivered Expedition 70/71/EP-21 crew to ISS. Novitsky and Vasilevskaya returned to Earth on Soyuz MS-24 with Loral O'Hara after thirteen days in space.	184 days
Soyuz MS-26	Soyuz-2.1a	Aleksey Ovchinin; Ivan Vagner; Donald Pettit		Delivered Expedition 71/72 crew to ISS.	220 days
Soyuz MS-27	Soyuz-2.1a	Sergey Ryzhikov; Alexey Zubritsky; Jonny Kim		Delivered Expedition 72/73 crew to ISS.	245 days
Soyuz MS-28	Soyuz-2.1a	Sergey Kud-Sverchkov; Sergey Mikayev; Christopher Williams		Delivered Expedition 73/74 crew to ISS.	241 days
In progress
Soyuz MS-29	Soyuz-2.1a	Pyotr Dubrov; Anna Kikina; Anil Menon		Delivered Expedition 74/75 crew to ISS.	265 days (planned)
Planned
Soyuz MS-30	Soyuz-2.1a	Dmitry Petelin; Konstantin Borisov; Deniz Burnham		Planned to rotate future ISS crew. Will deliver Expedition 75/76 crew to ISS.	~240 days (planned)
Soyuz MS-31	Soyuz-2.1a	Oleg Kononenko; Alexander Grebenkin; Marcos Berríos		Planned to rotate future ISS crew. Will deliver Expedition 76/77 crew to ISS.	~240 days (planned)
Soyuz MS-32	Soyuz-2.1a	Nikolai Chub; Aleksandr Gorbunov; TBA		Planned to rotate future ISS crew. Will deliver Expedition 77/78 crew to ISS.	~240 days (planned)
