= Deniz Burnham =

American astronaut (born 1985)

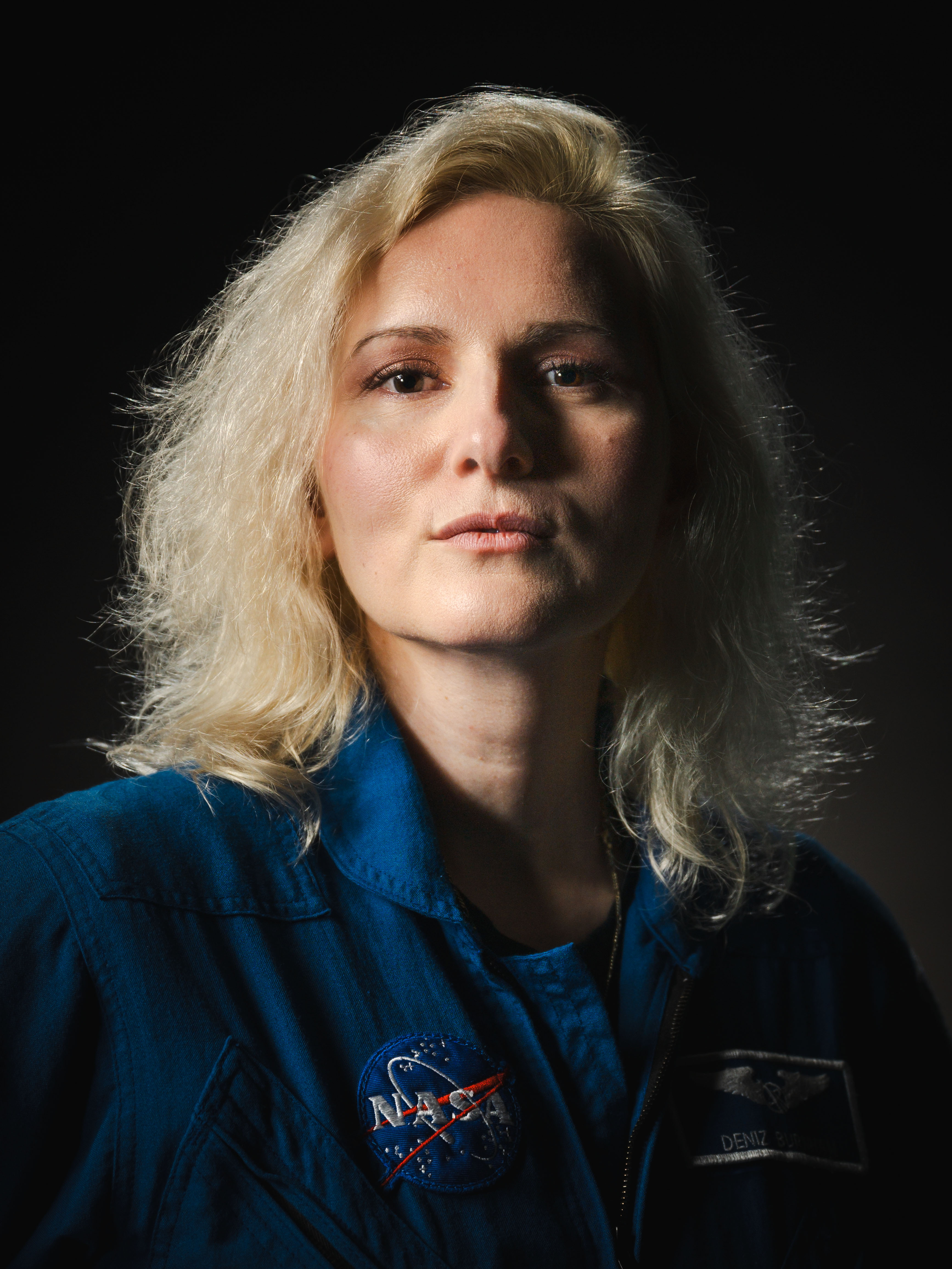
- Burnham in February 2024
- Born: Deniz Melissa Burnham; October 1, 1985 (age 41); Adana, Turkey
- Education: University of California, San Diego (BS); University of Southern California (MS)
- Space career

NASA astronaut
- Rank: Lieutenant, U.S. Navy Reserve
- Selection: NASA Group 23 (2021)
- Missions: Soyuz MS-30 (Expedition 75/76)

Deniz Melissa Burnham (born October 1, 1985) is a lieutenant in the United States Navy Reserve and NASA astronaut. She worked as a drilling engineer based in Wasilla, Alaska before working with NASA. She is set to make her first spaceflight in March 2027 as a flight engineer aboard Soyuz MS-30, serving on Expedition 75/76 aboard the International Space Station.

== Early life and education ==
Burnham was born at Incirlik Air Base in Adana, Turkey to parents Ed and Şahver Burnham. She relocated various times throughout her childhood due to her military family. Her Turkish mother had aspired to be a military officer and she later joined the United States Air Force.

Eventually, Burnham moved to Fairfield, California, graduating from Vanden High School. In 2007, she graduated from the University of California, San Diego with a bachelor's degree in chemical engineering and in 2017, graduated from the University of Southern California with a master's degree in mechanical engineering. During her time in graduate school, Burnham served as an intern at the NASA Ames Research Center.

== Career ==
For more than a decade, Burnham led offshore oil drilling operations in various locations across the United States and Canada. Burnham currently serves in the United States Navy Reserve as the executive officer of a shipyard operations unit in Alameda, California. In July 2026, she was designated as back up crew for the Soyuz MS-29 flight from the Baikonur Cosmodrome in Kazakhstan.

== Astronaut candidacy ==
On December 6, 2021, Burnham was revealed to be one of ten candidates selected as part NASA Astronaut Group 23. She started her training in January 2022, completed it with fellow astronaut candidates Anil Menon and Marcos Berrios in a ceremony on March 5, 2024.

== Spaceflight ==
In July 2026, NASA announced that Burnham had been assigned to her first mission to the International Space Station, serving as an Expedition 75/76 flight engineer. She is set to launch aboard the Roscosmos Soyuz MS-30 spacecraft alongside cosmonauts Dmitry Petelin and Konstantin Borisov with launch targeted for March 2027 from the Baikonur Cosmodrome; the crew is expected to spend about seven months aboard the station. During the expedition, Burnham is expected to conduct scientific investigations and technology demonstrations intended to help prepare for future human missions to the Moon and Mars.

== Personal life ==
Burnham lived in Wasilla, Alaska with her fiancé Shaun Little while working as a drilling engineer. Burnham holds a private pilot license, as well as helicopter and instrument ratings.
