= Soyuz MS-30 =

Planned 2027 Russian crewed spaceflight to the ISS

- Names: ISS 76S
- Mission type: Crewed mission to ISS
- Operator: Roscosmos
- Website: en.roscosmos.ru
- Mission duration: 240 days (planned)

Spacecraft properties
- Spacecraft type: Soyuz MS
- Manufacturer: Energia

Crew
- Crew size: 3
- Members: Dmitry Petelin; Konstantin Borisov; Deniz Burnham
- Callsign: Liner

Start of mission
- Launch date: 24 March 2027 (planned)
- Rocket: Soyuz-2.1a
- Launch site: Baikonur, Site 31
- Contractor: RKTs Progress

End of mission
- Landing date: November 2027 (planned)
- Landing site: Kazakh Steppe, Kazakhstan

Orbital parameters
- Reference system: Geocentric orbit
- Regime: Low Earth orbit
- Inclination: 51.66°

Docking with ISS
- Docking port: Rassvet nadir
- Docking date: 24 March 2027 (planned)
- Undocking date: November 2027 (planned)
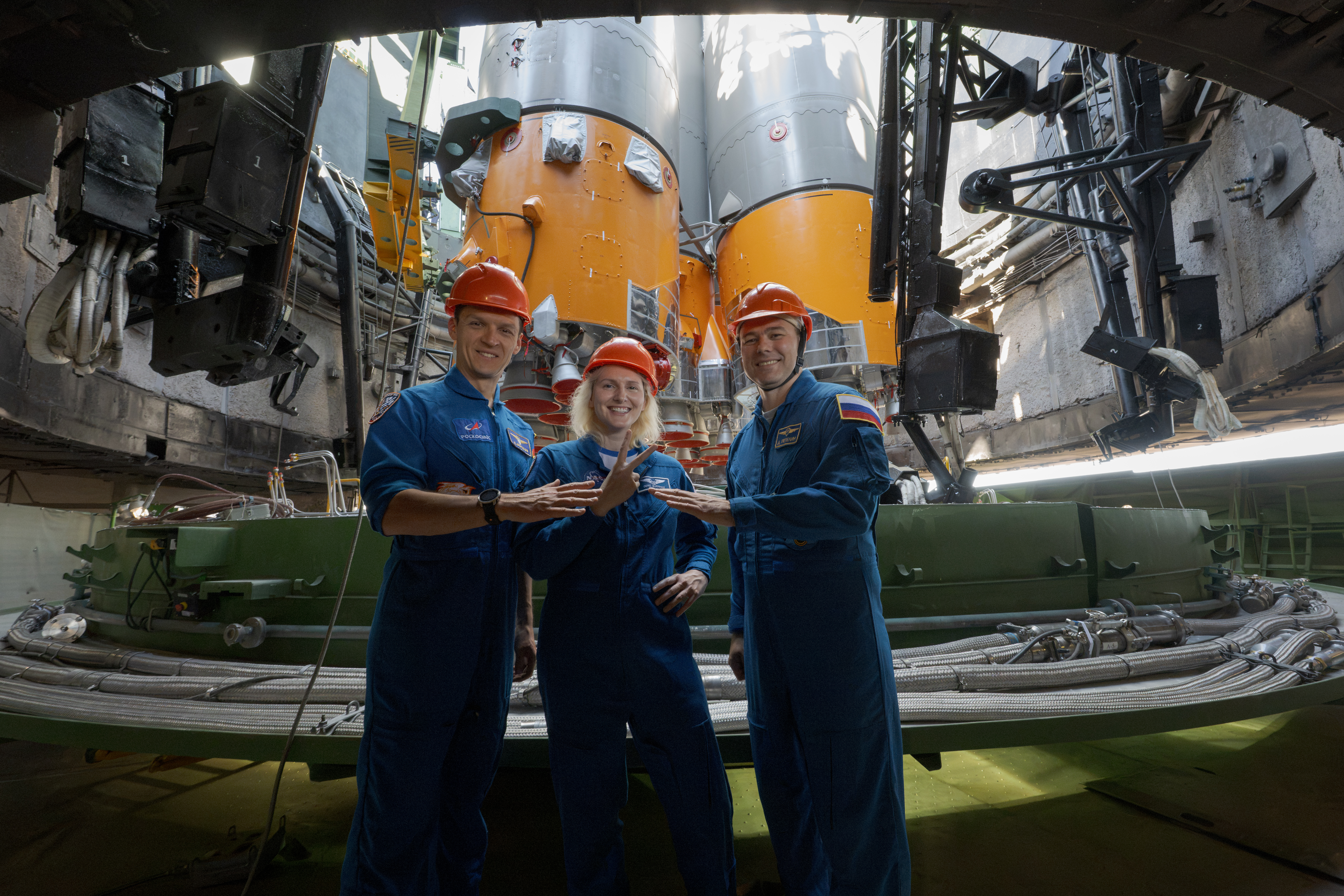
- Soyuz MS-30 crew poses at Baikonur Cosmodrome as a Soyuz rocket is placed into the launch pad. From left: Borisov, Burnham, and Petelin. Soyuz programme

Soyuz MS-30 is a planned Russian crewed Soyuz spaceflight targeted to launch from Baikonur in March 24, 2027 to the International Space Station, where the crew is expected to spend about seven months.

== Crew ==
Prime crew
Position	Crew
Commander	Dmitry Petelin, Roscosmos; Expedition 75/76; Second spaceflight
Flight engineer	Konstantin Borisov, Roscosmos; Expedition 75/76; Second spaceflight
Flight engineer	Deniz Burnham, NASA; Expedition 75/76; First spaceflight

Backup crew
Position	Crew
Commander	Oleg Kononenko, Roscosmos
Flight engineer	Alexander Grebenkin, Roscosmos
Flight engineer	Marcos Berríos, NASA

== Mission ==
Flight engineer Deniz Burnham will be making her first spaceflight, having been selected as a NASA astronaut in 2021 and graduating with the agency's 23rd astronaut class in 2024. During the expedition, Burnham is expected to conduct scientific investigations and technology demonstrations intended to help prepare for future human missions to the Moon and Mars.
