= Konstantin Borisov =

Russian cosmonaut (born 1984)

- Константин Борисов
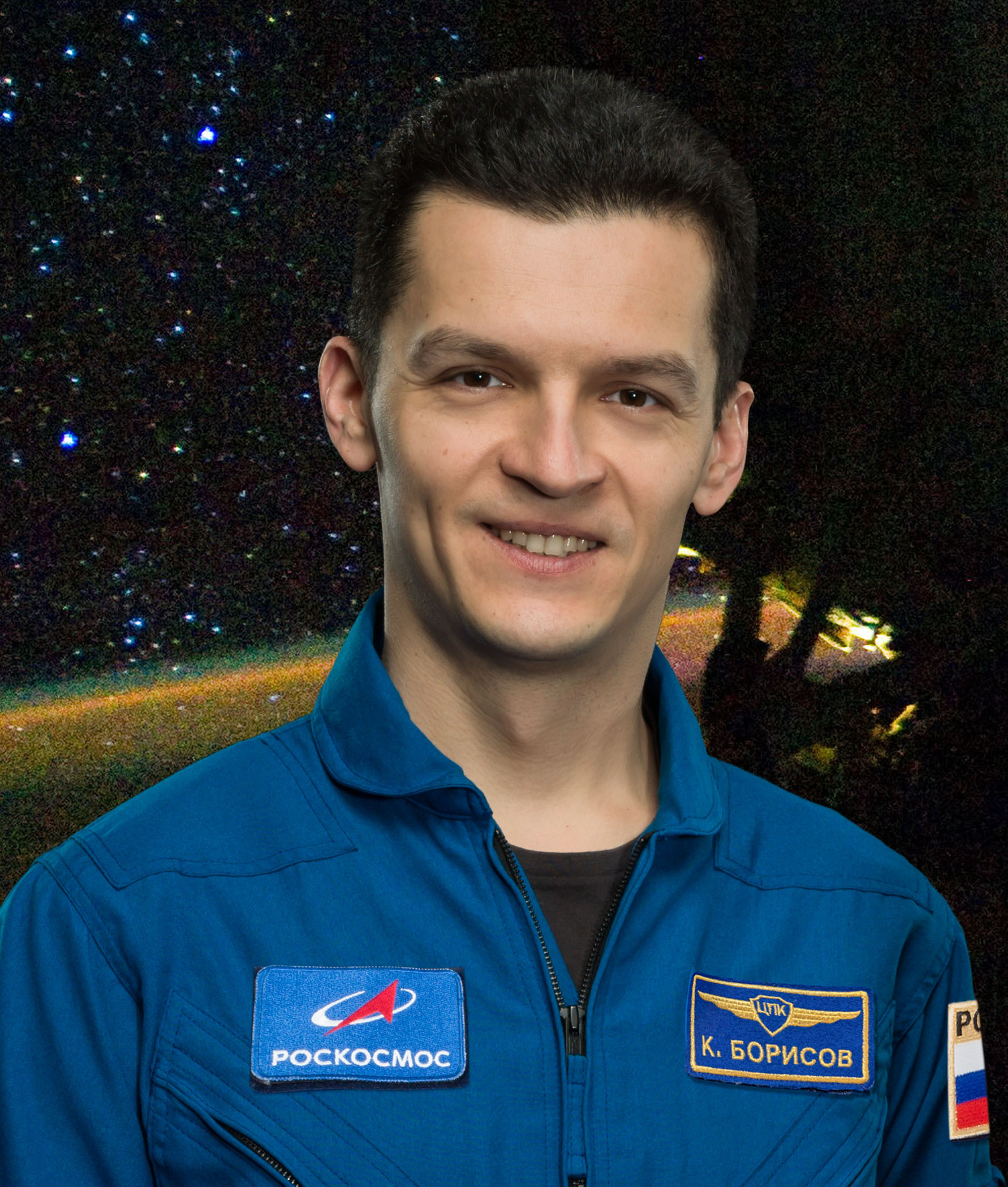
- Borisov in 2023
- Born: Konstantin Sergeyevich Borisov; 14 August 1984 (age 42); Smolensk, Russian SFSR, Soviet Union
- Education: Plekhanov Russian University of Economics (BEcon); University of Warwick (MS); Moscow Aviation Institute (MS)
- Awards: Hero of the Russian Federation; Pilot-Cosmonaut of the Russian Federation
- Space career

Roscosmos cosmonaut
- Current occupation: Test cosmonaut
- Status: Active
- Time in space: 199 days, 2 hours, 20 minutes
- Selection: 17th Cosmonaut Group (2018)
- Missions: SpaceX Crew-7 (Expedition 69/70); Soyuz MS-30 (Expedition 75/76)

Konstantin Sergeyevich Borisov (Russian: Константин Сергеевич Борисов; born 14 August 1984 in Smolensk) is a Russian cosmonaut. He flew on the SpaceX Crew-7 mission that launched on 26 August 2023, serving as flight engineer on Expedition 69/70 to the International Space Station.

== Biography ==
He has received a Bachelor of Economics from the Plekhanov Russian University of Economics on 27 June 2007. From 27 September 2006 to 3 December 2007 he studied at University of Warwick, Coventry, UK, where he received his Master of Science in "Operations Research and Systems Analysis". In June 2018, he completed his studies at the Moscow Aviation Institute on the Master Program Life Support Systems for Aircraft (2016-2018), with the qualification "Master" in the direction of Aircraft Building.

Borisov was selected as a cosmonaut in 2018, along with seven others, he passed the state exam in December 2020 to be qualified for spaceflight assignments.

== Spaceflight ==
Borisov was assigned to the SpaceX Crew-7 mission, which launched on 26 August 2023. He served as a flight engineer on Expedition 69/70. On 12 March 2024, the mission landed off the coast of Florida after spending 199 days in space and orbiting the Earth 3,184 times.
