= Dmitry Petelin =

Russian cosmonaut (born 1983)

- Дмитрий Петелин
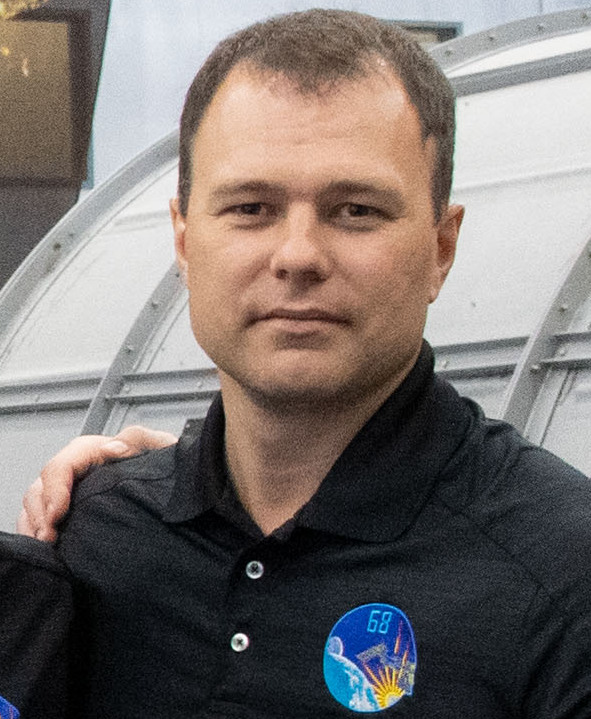
- Born: 10 July 1983 (age 43); Kustanai, Kazakh SSR, USSR
- Space career

Roscosmos cosmonaut
- Current occupation: Test cosmonaut
- Previous occupation: Aeronautical engineer
- Status: Active
- Time in space: 370 days, 21 hours, 23 minutes
- Selection: TsPK 2012 Cosmonaut Group
- Total EVAs: 6
- Total EVA time: 39 hours, 44 minutes
- Missions: Soyuz MS-22/MS-23 (Expedition 67/68/69); Soyuz MS-30 (Expedition 75/76)
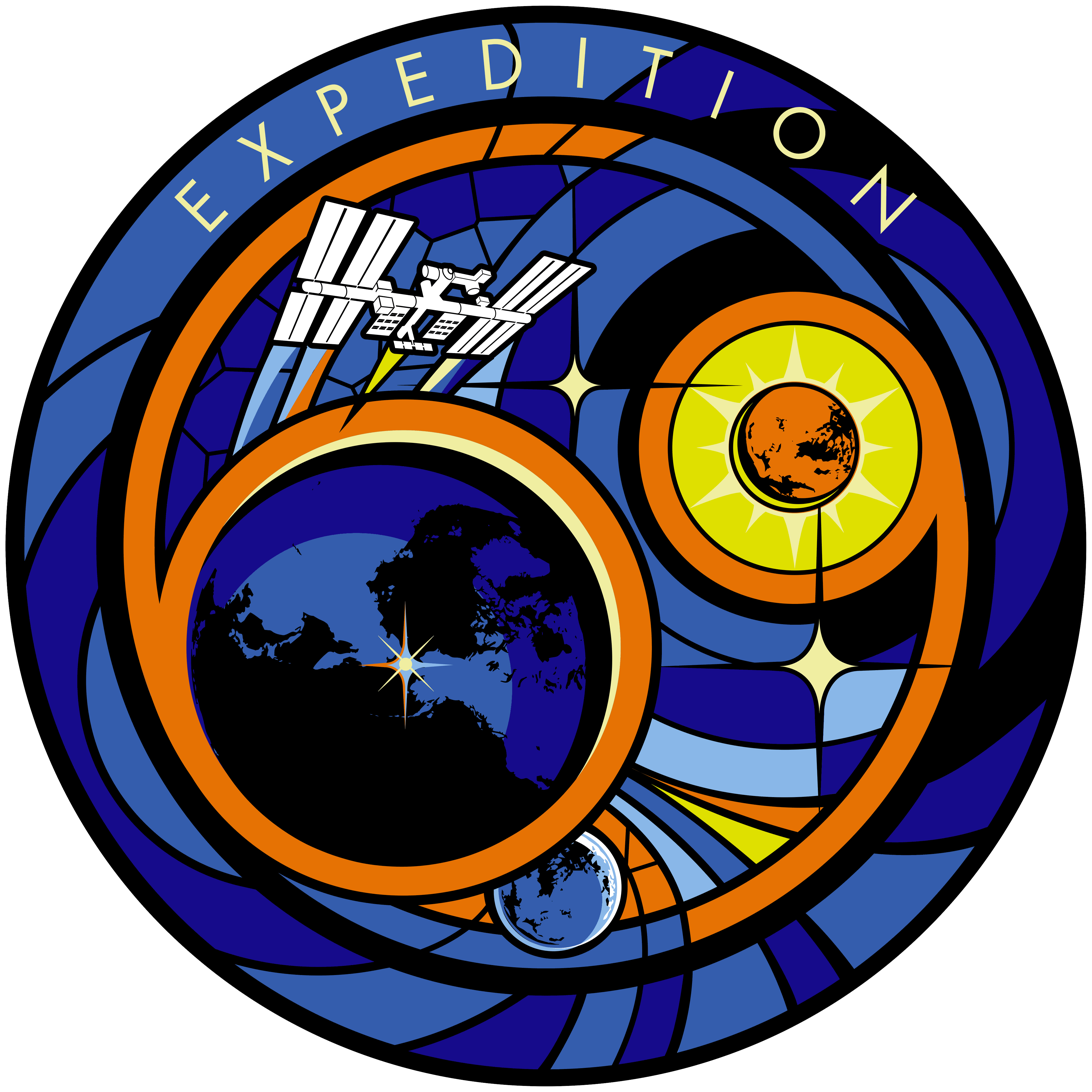
- Mission insignia

Dmitry Aleksandrovich Petelin (Russian: Дмитрий Александрович Петелин; born July 10, 1983) is a Russian cosmonaut who was part of the 2012 selection group.

He flew to the ISS on September 21, 2022 with Soyuz MS-22, which was damaged while being docked to the station, and returned to Earth on September 27, 2023 with Soyuz MS-23 after spending a year in space.

== Biography ==
Petelin graduated from the South Ural State University in 2006 with a degree in aircraft and helicopter engineering. Following graduation, he worked as an engineer for NIK, LLC. On October 26, 2012, he became a cosmonaut and reported to the Yuri Gagarin Cosmonaut Training Center. He completed cosmonaut training and was named a test cosmonaut on July 15, 2014.

He is married and has two daughters.
