= Sergey Prokopyev (cosmonaut) =

Russian cosmonaut (born 1975)

- Сергей Прокопьев
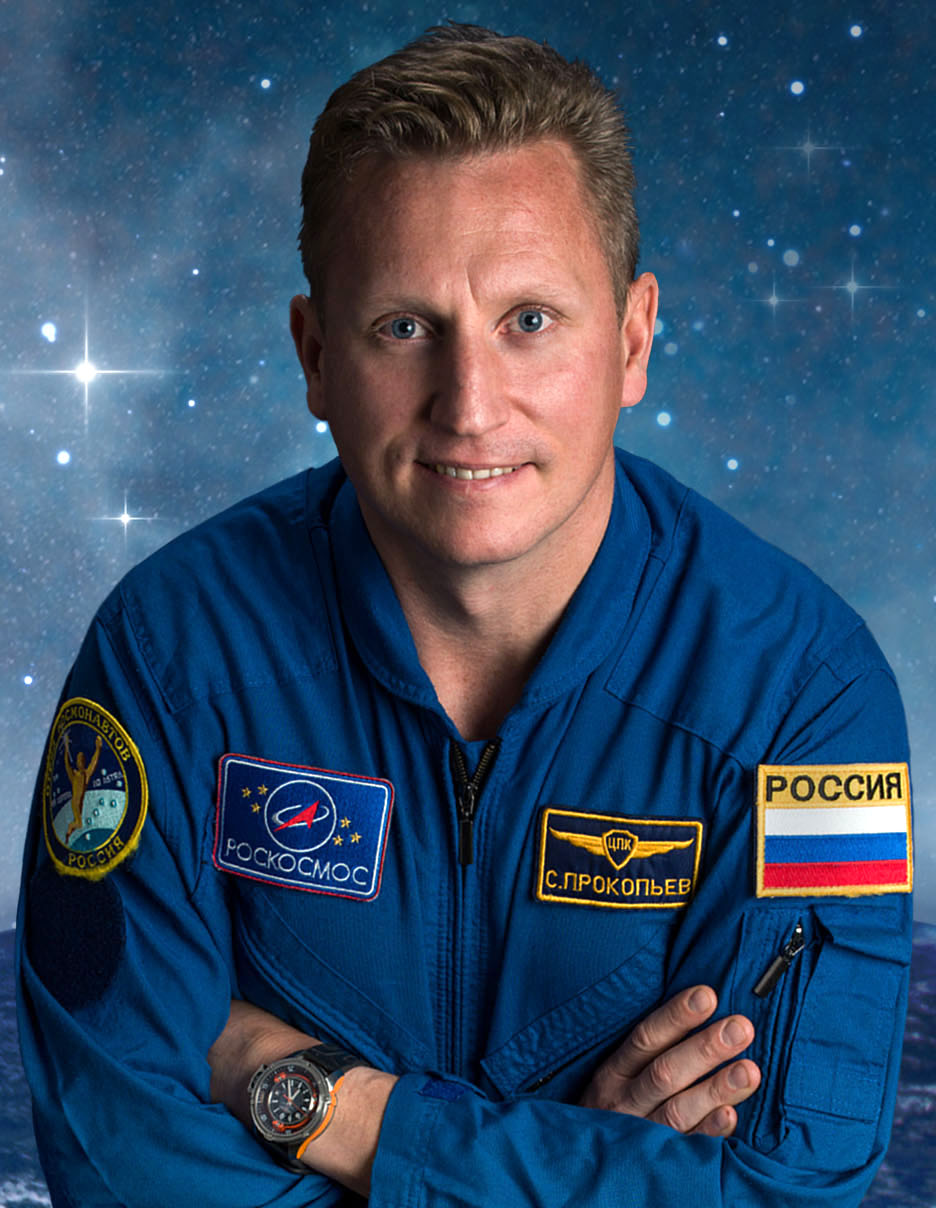
- Born: 19 February 1975 (age 51); Sverdlovsk, Russian SFSR, Soviet Union
- Occupation: Pilot
- Awards: Hero of the Russian Federation
- Space career

Roscosmos cosmonaut
- Status: Active
- Rank: Commander
- Time in space: 567 days, 15 hours and 12 minutes
- Selection: TsPK-15/RKKE-17 Cosmonaut Group
- Total EVAs: 8
- Total EVA time: 55 hours, 15 minutes
- Missions: Soyuz MS-09 (Expedition 56/57), Soyuz MS-22/Soyuz MS-23 (Expedition 67/68/69)
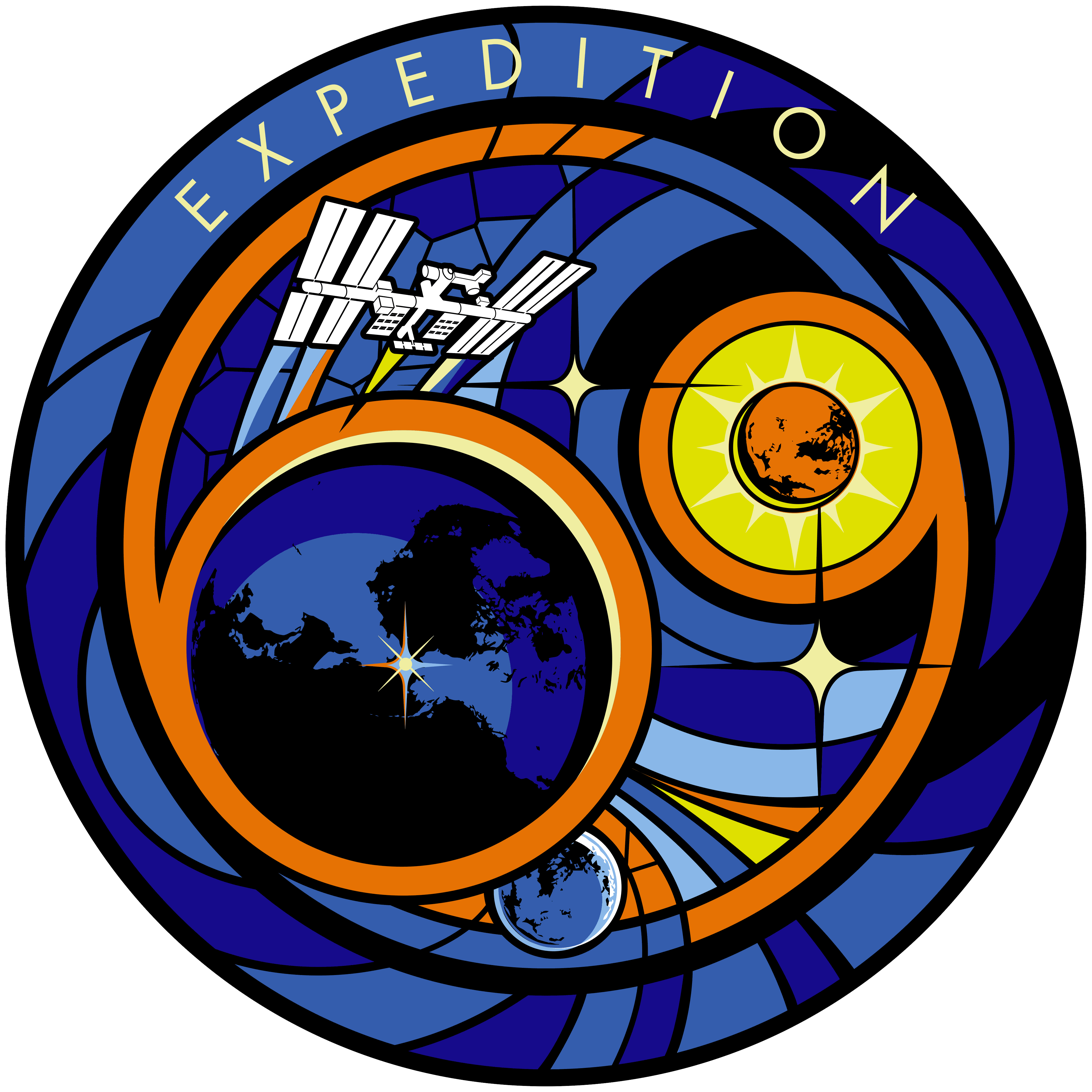
- Mission insignia

Sergey Valeryevich Prokopyev (Russian: Серге́й Вале́рьевич Проко́пьев; born 19 February 1975) is a Russian cosmonaut. On June 6, 2018, he launched on his first flight into space aboard Soyuz MS-09 and spent 197 days in space as a flight engineer on Expedition 56/57. On September 21, 2022, he launched aboard Soyuz MS-22 and returned onboard Soyuz MS-23 on September 27, 2023.

== Cosmonaut career ==
In October 2010 Prokopyev was selected as a cosmonaut by Roscosmos, he began cosmonaut training February 2011, he graduated and gained the qualification of "test cosmonaut" in August 2012.

Following his graduation he was part of the specialization and improvement group for the ISS Russian Orbital Segment and Soyuz TMA-M spacecraft, he held this position until June 2015 when he was assigned to a backup crew.

He trained as backup flight engineer for Soyuz TMA-18M and ISS EP-18, training for a short-duration eight day stay on the ISS that was eventually flown by KazCosmos cosmonaut Aidyn Aimbetov. Unlike most backup assignments, his assignment to TMA-18M did not lead into a later prime crew assignment, therefore following the launch of TMA-18M on 2 September 2015 Prokopyev was not rotated onto a prime crew immediately.

=== Expedition 56/57 ===
Prokopyev was originally meant to be Soyuz commander on Soyuz MS-08 and flight engineer on ISS Expedition 55/56 although due to Russian budget cutbacks reducing the number of crew members on the ISS Russian segment he was removed from the flight and instead was assigned as backup Soyuz commander Soyuz MS-07 and flight engineer/ISS commander for Expedition 54/55. Following the launch of Expedition 54/55 he was assigned as prime crew flight engineer for Expedition 56/57 alongside German Alexander Gerst, who would serve as ISS commander for Expedition 57, and NASA astronaut Jeanette Epps, who would later be replaced by astronaut Serena Aunon-Chancellor.

The trio launched on Soyuz MS-09 from the Baikonur Cosmodrome on 6 June 2018 and spent approximately two days free flying in Low Earth orbit before the rendezvoused and docked to the ISS on 8 June, officially joined the Expedition 56 alongside American astronauts Andrew Feustel and Richard Arnold as well as Russian cosmonaut Oleg Artemyev. He performed his first Spacewalk alongside Artemyev on 15 August, the two spent 7 hours and 46 minutes working outside the station where they installed a Roscosmos-DLR experiment for observing animal migration, called ICARUS onto the outside of the station and manually deployed four CubeSat into orbit. On 29 August an air leak was observed inside the station, this was later discovered to be caused by a hole aboard Soyuz MS-09, Prokopyev's spacecraft.

Following the departure of Soyuz MS-08 on 4 October 2018, Prokopyev, Gerst and Aunon-Chancellor transferred over to Expedition 57, they were scheduled to be joined by Russian cosmonaut Aleksey Ovchinin and American astronaut Nick Hague on 11 October, although the flight was aborted during launch cancelling their arrival. In order to avoid de-crewing the space station, the landing of MS-09 was delayed from 11 December to 20 December, while the launch of Soyuz MS-11 was advanced from 20 December to 3 December, giving the two spacecraft and their six crew members a 17 day hand-over period. Prokopyev and his two crew mates worked together as a crew of three until 3 December 2018, with the arrival of Soyuz MS-11 carrying Russian cosmonaut Oleg Kononenko, CSA astronaut David Saint-Jacques and NASA astronaut Anne McClain. During his final days on the ISS on 11 December 2018, he and Kononenko performed a spacewalk to inspect the hole on Soyuz MS-09, they took images and applied a thermal blanket to the damaged area on the Soyuz's "orbital module", towards the end of the excursion the two also retrieved some science experiments from the outside of the station.

He, Gerst, and Aunon-Chancellor returned to Earth on 20 December 2018, ending Prokopyev's first spaceflight after 196 days in space.

=== Expedition 67/68/69 ===
Prokopyev launched for his second journey to space on 21 September 2022 aboard Soyuz MS-22 to the International Space Station. He was the ISS commander with Russian cosmonaut Dmitry Petelin and NASA astronaut Francisco Rubio. Prokopyev was part of Expedition 67/68/69. His second mission was planned to last around 6 months with a return to Earth in early 2023. However, damage to the Soyuz MS-22 spacecraft extended the mission, and Prokopyev returned to Earth on 27 September 2023 with Soyuz MS-23 after spending a year in space.

== Personal life ==
Prokopyev is married to Ekaterina Prokopyeva (née Negreyeva), who gave birth to their daughter, Anna, on 27 August 1997 and son, Timofei, on 23 February 2010.

== Awards and honors ==
- Hero of the Russian Federation (11 November 2019)
- Pilot-Cosmonaut of the Russian Federation (11 November 2019)
- Medal of Y. A. Gagarin (Roscosmos)
- Order of Military Merit
- Medal "For Distinction in Military Service" (MoD), 2nd and 3rd classes
- Medal "For Participation in a Military Parade on Victory Day" (MoD)

== See also ==
- List of Heroes of the Russian Federation

Preceded by Samantha Cristoforetti	ISS Commander (Expedition 68/69); 12 October 2022 to 26 September 2023	Succeeded by Andreas Mogensen
