= NASA Astronaut Group 20 =

2009 human spaceflight selection of 14 candidates; "The Chumps"

The Chumps
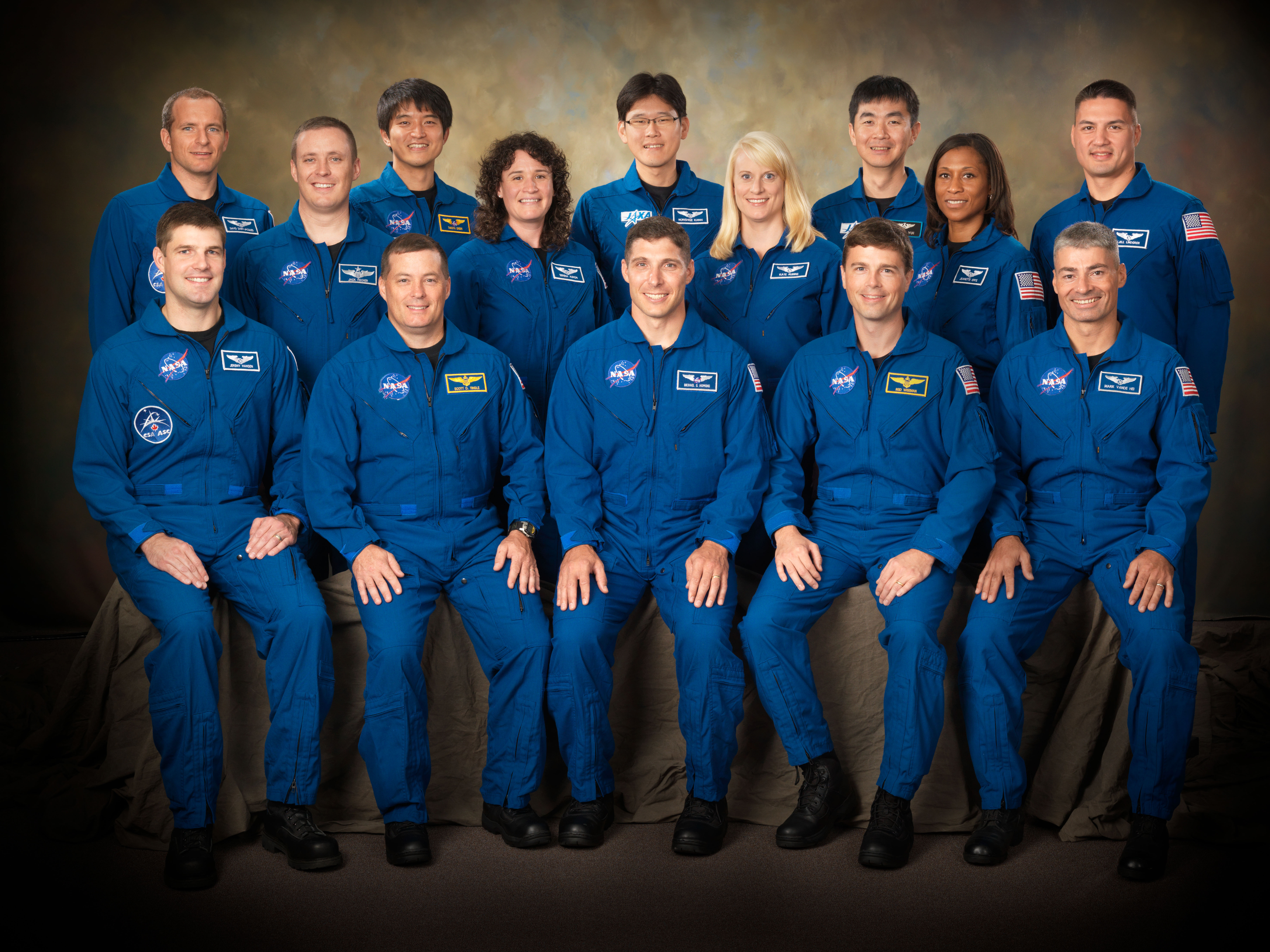
- Front row, from the left to right: Jeremy Hansen, Scott D. Tingle, Michael S. Hopkins, Reid Wiseman and Mark T. Vande Hei. Middle row, from the left to right: Jack D. Fischer, Serena M. Auñón, Kathleen (Kate) Rubins and Jeanette J. Epps. Back row, from the left to right: David Saint-Jacques, Takuya Onishi, Norishige Kanai, Kimiya Yui and Kjell N. Lindgren
- Year selected: 2009
- Number selected: 14

NASA Astronaut Group 20 (nicknamed "The Chumps") saw the training of nine mission specialists and five international mission specialists to become NASA astronauts. These 14 astronauts began training in August 2009 and officially graduated as astronauts on 4 November 2011.

== Mission specialists ==
- Serena M. Auñón (1 flight)
  - Soyuz MS-09
    - Flight engineer, Expedition 56/57
- Jeanette J. Epps (1 flight)
  - Mission specialist, SpaceX Crew-8
    - Flight engineer, Expedition 70/71/72
- Jack D. Fischer (1 flight)
  - Soyuz MS-04
    - Flight engineer, Expedition 52/53
- Michael S. Hopkins (2 flights)
  - Soyuz TMA-10M
    - Flight engineer, Expedition 37/38
  - Commander, SpaceX Crew-1
    - Flight engineer, Expedition 64/65
- Kjell N. Lindgren (2 flights)
  - Soyuz TMA-17M
    - Flight engineer, Expedition 44/45
  - Commander, SpaceX Crew-4
    - Flight engineer, Expedition 67/68
- Kathleen Rubins (2 flights)
  - Soyuz MS-01
    - Flight engineer, Expedition 48/49
  - Soyuz MS-17
    - Flight engineer, Expedition 63/64
- Scott D. Tingle (1 flight)
  - Current Chief of the Astronaut Office
  - Soyuz MS-07
    - Flight engineer, Expedition 54/55
- Mark T. Vande Hei (2 flights)
  - Soyuz MS-06
    - Flight engineer, Expedition 53/54
  - Soyuz MS-18/MS-19
    - Flight engineer, Expedition 64/65/66
- Reid Wiseman (2 flights)
  - Former Chief of the Astronaut Office
  - Soyuz TMA-13M
    - Flight engineer, Expedition 40/41
  - Commander, Artemis II

== International mission specialists ==
- Jeremy Hansen, CSA (1 flight)
  - Mission specialist, Artemis II
- Norishige Kanai, JAXA (1 flight)
  - Soyuz MS-07
    - Flight engineer, Expedition 54/55
- Takuya Onishi, JAXA (2 flights)
  - Soyuz MS-01
    - Flight engineer, Expedition 48/49
  - Mission specialist, SpaceX Crew-10
    - Flight engineer/Commander, Expedition 72/73
- David Saint-Jacques, CSA (1 flight)
  - Soyuz MS-11
    - Flight engineer, Expedition 57/58/59
- Kimiya Yui, JAXA (2 flights)
  - Soyuz TMA-17M
    - Flight engineer, Expedition 44/45
  - Mission specialist, SpaceX Crew-11
    - Flight engineer, Expedition 73/74

== See also ==
- List of astronauts by selection
- NASA Astronaut Group 21
