= Scott D. Tingle =

American astronaut (born 1965)

Scott Tingle
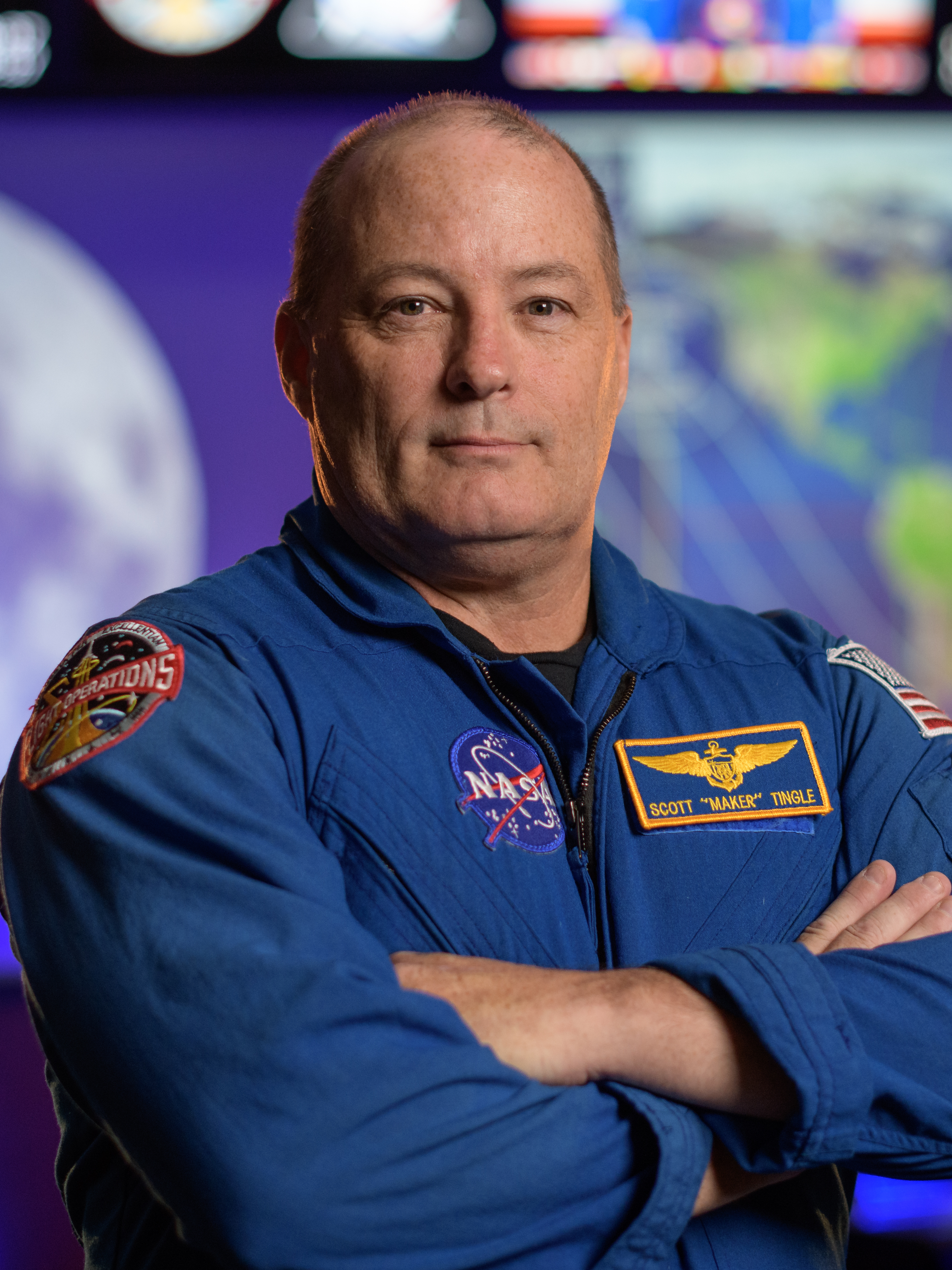
- Tingle in 2020
- Born: Scott David Tingle; July 19, 1965 (age 61); Attleboro, Massachusetts, U.S.
- Education: University of Massachusetts, Dartmouth (BS); Purdue University (MS)
- Space career

NASA astronaut
- Time in space: 168 days, 5 hours, 18 minutes
- Selection: NASA Group 20 (2009)
- Total EVAs: 1
- Total EVA time: 7 hours, 24 minutes
- Mission: Soyuz MS-07 (Expedition 54/55)
- Mission insignia
- Military career
- Branch: United States Navy
- Years: 2011–present
- Rank: Captain
- Nickname: "Maker"
- Awards: Meritorious Service Medal; Air Medal; Air and Space Commendation Medal (with valor)

Scott David Tingle (born July 19, 1965) is a NASA astronaut. He was selected in June 2009 as a member of the NASA Astronaut Group 20, qualifying in 2011. Serving as a flight engineer as part of Expedition 54 and 55, Tingle launched into space on board Soyuz MS-07 in December 2017, and returned in June 2018. Tingle is a highly decorated naval pilot, having flown 51 types of aircraft over more than 4,500 flight hours, landed 750 aircraft with carrier arrestments, and fought in 54 combat missions.

Since November 2025, he has served as the Chief of the Astronaut Office, the leader of the NASA Astronaut Corps. This management position makes him ineligible for flight assignments.

== Early years and education ==
Scott Tingle is a captain in the U.S. Navy. He was born Scott D. Tingle in Attleboro, Massachusetts. Tingle became interested in space while working as a machine draftsman in Blue Hills Regional Technical School, class of 1983. He continued to study mechanical engineering, earning a Bachelor of Science in Mechanical Engineering while attending Southeastern Massachusetts University in 1987, and a Master of Science in Mechanical Engineering from Purdue University in 1988. In 2009 his fourth application to the Astronaut Corps was accepted.

== Military service ==
In 1991, Tingle was commissioned as a naval officer, and reported to NAS Pensacola, Florida for flight training. He was designated a Naval Aviator in 1993, and, after a period of instruction in the F/A-18, was subsequently assigned to VFA-146, based out of NAS Lemoore, California. With VFA-146, he deployed with Carrier Air Wing Nine aboard the USS Nimitz, and made deployments to the Western Pacific Ocean and Persian Gulf. In 1997, he was selected to attend the United States Naval Test Pilot School, and graduated in June 1998. Following graduation, he became an operational test pilot at China Lake, California with the Vampires of VX-9. Following completion of his developmental test tour, Tingle completed a Landing Signal Officer "CAG Paddles" tour, flying F/A-18A/C Hornets alongside Carrier Air Wing Eleven (CVW-11) aboard the USS Carl Vinson. USS Carl Vinson and Carrier Air Wing Eleven were the first air response to the September 11 attacks, and later assisted in the execution of Operation Enduring Freedom in Afghanistan. Tingle then completed an assignment as an assistant operations officer with Strike Fighter Wing Pacific and briefly served as an instructor pilot with VFA-122. He later returned to Lemoore as a safety, maintenance, and operations officer department head with VFA-97. With VFA-97, he again deployed to the Western Pacific and Persian Gulf with CVW-11 before transferring to Iwakuni, Japan with Marine Air Group Twelve (MAG-12). In 2005, Tingle was assigned as the Ship Suitability Department Head at Patuxent River, Maryland, where he served as a test pilot with VX-23. At Patuxent River, Tingle tested the F/A-18C Hornet, FA-18E/F Super Hornet, and EA-18G Growler aircraft carrier precision landing systems. At the time of his selection as an astronaut, Tingle was working as a systems engineer and program manager on the Standoff Land Attack Missile (SLAM) and harpoon weapons systems at PMA-201.

== NASA career ==
In July 2009 Scott D. Tingle became a member of the 20th astronaut class. His training consisted of flight familiarization with T-38's, spacewalks, technical training regarding the systems of The International space station and Soyuz designs, and standard wilderness survival training.

In 2014, Tingle served as cavenaut into the ESA CAVES training in Sardinia, alongside Alexander Misurkin, Sergey Kud-Sverchkov, Luca Parmitano, and Matthias Mauer.

In November 2025, Tingle was named the 19th Chief of the Astronaut Office at Johnson Space Center.

=== Expedition 54/55 ===
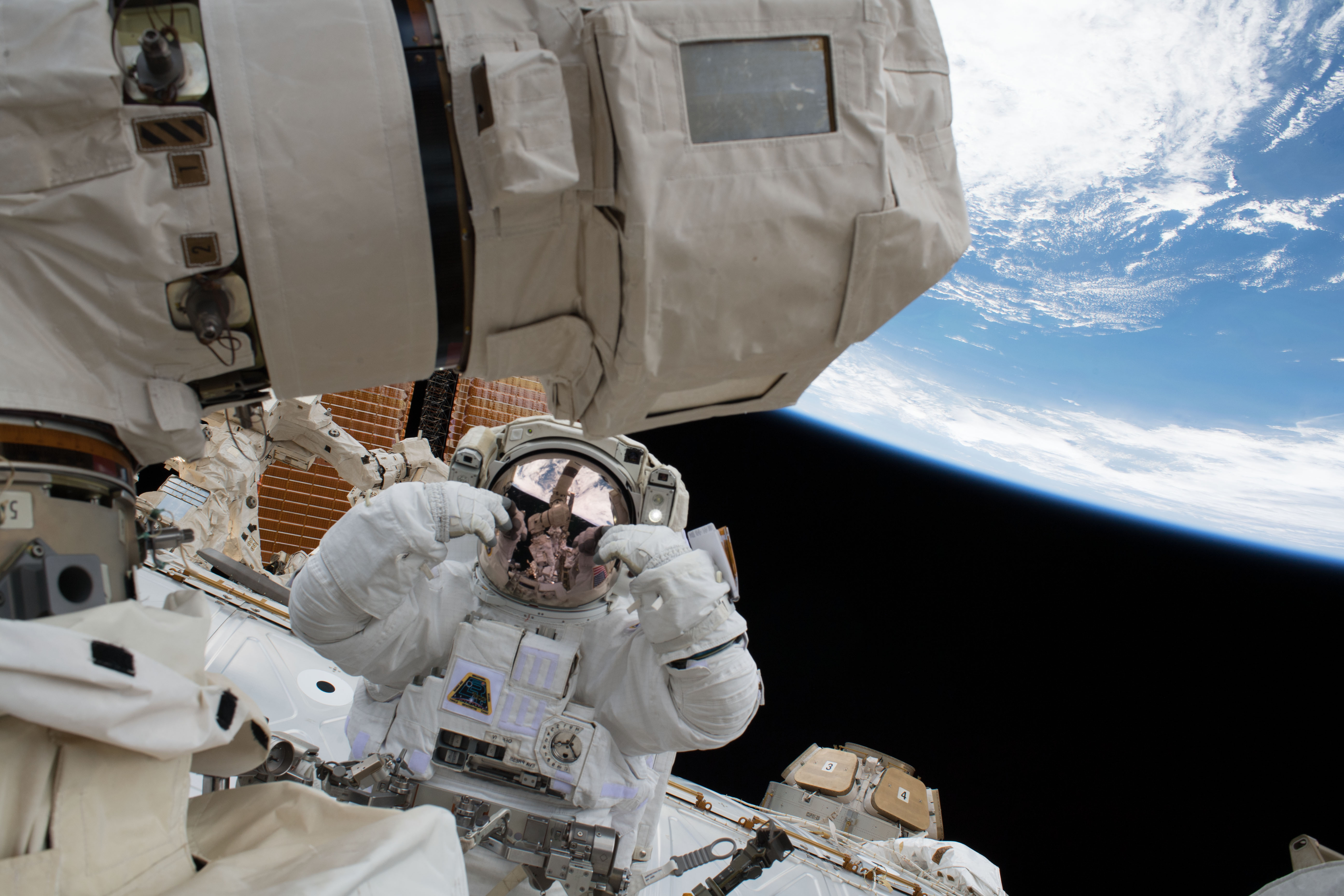
Tingle during his first EVA

In May 2016 he was assigned to the crew of ISS Expedition 53/54, as flight engineer for both expeditions, alongside Russian cosmonauts Aleksandr Skvortsov and Ivan Vagner. The trio was scheduled to launch in September 2017 aboard Soyuz MS-06. Although due to a Russian decision to reduce the number of crew members aboard the Russian Orbital Segment until the launch of their long delayed Nauka laboratory module, Vagner was removed from Skvortosv and Tingle's crew. This resulted in Tingle being moved from the "Flight Engineer-2" position on the Soyuz to the much more systems intensive "Flight Engineer-1" position, this resulted in Tingle needing more time to train for his flight so he and Skvortsov were pushed back to ISS Expedition 54/55, they were joined by JAXA astronaut Norishige Kanai. The ISS-54/55 crew changed one more time when Skvortsov was pushed back to a later flight due to a temporary medical condition and replaced with cosmonaut Anton Shkaplerov.

Shkaplerov, Tingle, and Kanai launched on board Soyuz MS-07 on 17 December 2017 07:21 UTC. Originally they were planned to rendezvous with the ISS in just six hours, although due to NASA wanting the launch to be advanced by ten days from December 27 the spacecraft was reverted to the older two-day rendezvous scheme. The three safely arrived aboard the ISS on December 19 and joined the Expedition 54 crew.

On January 23, 2018, Tingle performed his first EVA with Mark Vande Hei. The objective was to replace one of two redundant latching end effectors (LEE) on Canadarm2, the station's robotic arm, which had experienced some degradation of its snaring cables. The duration of the EVA was 7 hours and 24 minutes.

Tingle and his two crewmates returned to Earth on June 3, 2018, following 168 days in space.

Since November 2025, he has served as the Chief of the Astronaut Office, the leader of the NASA Astronaut Corps. This management position makes him ineligible for flight assignments.

== Personal life ==
Scott Tingle is married to Raynette Mahelona Tingle and has three children. Although he was born in Attleboro, he considers his hometown to be Randolph, Massachusetts. At age 15 he took guitar lessons from a neighbor, at age 16 he joined a band that he continued to play with through college, writing original music and playing at clubs in Kenmore Square and Providence. Tingle cites his experience in a rock band as contributing to team skills he needed as an astronaut.

== Awards and honors ==
Through his educational, military, and NASA career, Tingle has received many awards and honors. He graduated magna cum laude from Southeastern Massachusetts University, earned Outstanding Graduate of U.S. Navy Test Pilot School Class 113, and was awarded Meritorious Service Medal, three Air Medals, six Navy Commendation Medals, four Navy and Marine Corps Achievement Medals, and a Combat V medal.
