= Expedition 56 =

56th expedition to the International Space Station

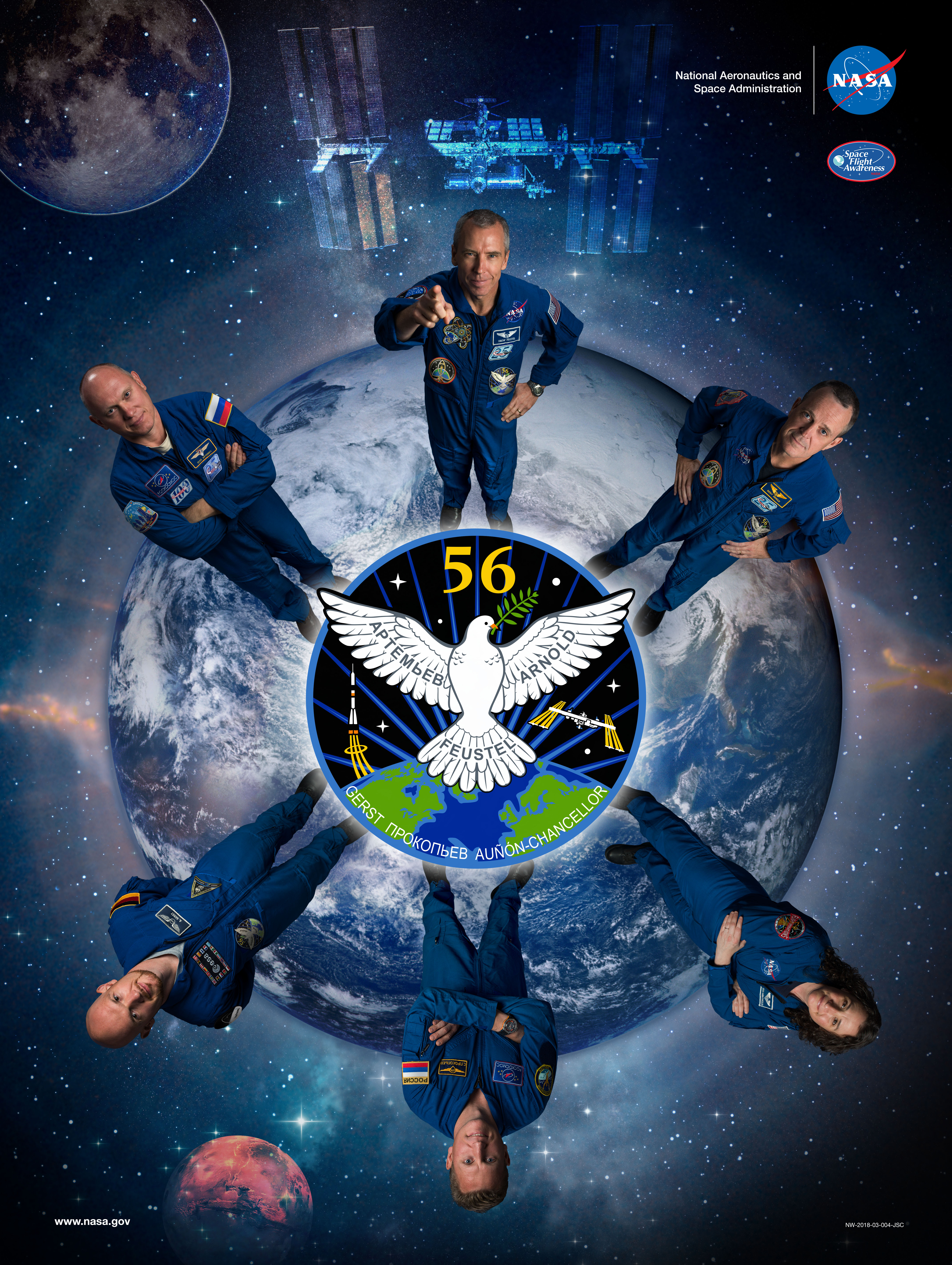
- Promotional Poster
- Mission type: Long-duration expedition
- Mission duration: 124d 13h 30m (Change Of Command to Soyuz MS-08 Undocking); 122d 22h 41m (Official)

Expedition
- Space station: International Space Station
- Began: June 1, 2018 (Change of Command); June 3, 2018 (Official) UTC
- Ended: October 4, 2018, UTC
- Arrived aboard: Soyuz MS-08; Soyuz MS-09
- Departed aboard: Soyuz MS-08; Soyuz MS-09

Crew
- Crew size: 6
- Members: Expedition 55/56: Andrew Feustel; Oleg Artemyev; Richard R. Arnold; Expedition 56/57: Alexander Gerst; Serena M. Auñón-Chancellor; Sergey Prokopyev
- EVAs: 2
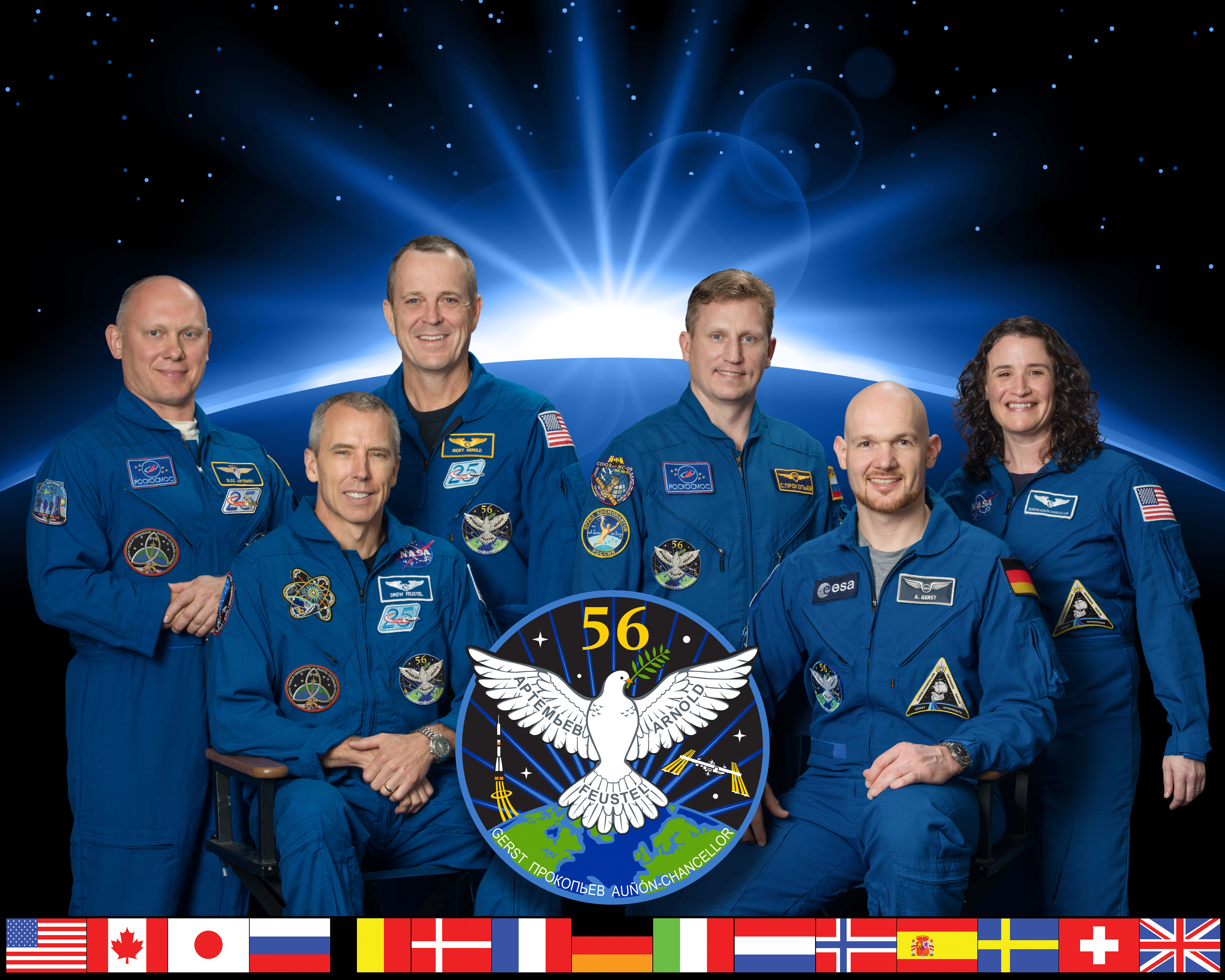
- Expedition 56 mission patch (l-r) Artemyev, Feustel, Arnold, Prokopyev, Gerst, and Auñón-Chancellor ISS expeditions

Expedition 56 was the 56th expedition to the International Space Station, which began on June 3, 2018, upon the departure of Soyuz MS-07. Andrew Feustel, Oleg Artemyev, and Richard R. Arnold were transferred from Expedition 55, with Andrew Feustel taking the commander role. Alexander Gerst, Serena M. Auñón-Chancellor, and Sergey Prokopyev launched aboard Soyuz MS-09, on June 6, 2018. Expedition 56 ended with the departure of Soyuz MS-08 on October 4, 2018.

== Crew ==
Position	First part (June 3 – 6, 2018)	Second part (June 6 – October 4, 2018)
Commander	Andrew Feustel, NASA; Third and last spaceflight	
Flight engineer	Oleg Artemyev, RSA; Second spaceflight	
Flight engineer	Richard R. Arnold, NASA; Second and last spaceflight	
Flight engineer	Off station	Sergey Prokopyev, RSA; First spaceflight
Flight engineer	Off station	Alexander Gerst, ESA; Second spaceflight
Flight engineer	Off station	Serena M. Auñón-Chancellor, NASA; Only spaceflight

Originally, NASA astronaut Jeanette Epps was assigned as flight engineer for Expeditions 56 and 57, becoming the first African American space station crew member and the 15th African American to fly in space, but on January 16, 2018, NASA announced that Epps had been replaced by her backup Serena M. Auñón-Chancellor with no announced explanation as to why.

== Spacewalks ==
EVA #	Spacewalkers	Start (UTC)	End (UTC)	Duration
Expedition 56; EVA 1	Andrew J. Feustel; Richard R. Arnold	June 14, 2018; 12:06	June 14, 2018; 18:55	6 hours, 49 minutes
Expedition 56; EVA 1	Feustel and Arnold installed new high-definition cameras near IDA 2 mated to the front end of the station's Harmony module. The additions will provide enhanced views during the final phase of approach and docking of the SpaceX Crew Dragon and Boeing CST 100 Starliner commercial crew spacecraft that will soon begin launching from American soil. The astronauts also swapped out a camera assembly on the starboard truss of the station used to film NASA TV and closed an aperture door on the CATS experiment outside the Japanese Kibo module in preparation for disposal on SpaceX CRS 15 and replacement by its successor, ECOSTRESS. Get aheads involved relocating an adjustable grapple bar to the S1 Truss and securing the Flex Hose Rotary Coupler in preparation for replacement on the next spacewalk. During the spacewalk Feustel beat Jerry Ross, his STS 125 crewmate Dr. John Grunsfeld, Fyoder Yurchikhin, and Peggy Whitson to become third on the list of all time spacewalkers.			
Expedition 56; EVA 2*	Oleg Artemyev; Sergey Prokopyev	August 15, 2018; 16:17	August 15, 2018; 00:03	7 hours, 46 minutes
Expedition 56; EVA 2*	The cosmonauts launched four cubesats and installed the Icarus experiment. Spacewalk fell behind schedule when Icarus failed to seat properly putting the spacewalk 90 minutes behind schedule and calling for an hour extension. The cosmonauts finished the spacewalk by retrieving experiments from the Pirs docking compartment and Poisk module.			

*denotes spacewalks performed from the Pirs docking compartment in Russian Orlan suits.
All other spacewalks were performed from the Quest airlock.

== Uncrewed spaceflights to the ISS ==
Resupply missions that visited the International Space Station during Expedition 56:

Spacecraft: ISS flight number	Country	Mission	Launcher	Launch (UTC)	Docked/Berthed (UTC) ^{†}	Undocked/Unberthed (UTC)	Duration (Docked)	Deorbit
SpaceX CRS-15: CRS SpX-15	United States	Logistics	Falcon 9	June 29, 2018, 09:42	July 2, 2018, 13:50	August 3, 2018, 16:38	32d 2h 48m	August 3, 2018, 22:17
Progress MS-09: ISS 70P	Russia	Logistics	Soyuz-2.1a	July 9, 2018, 21:51:34	July 10, 2018, 01:30:48	January 25, 2019, 12:55	199d 11h 24m	January 25, 2019, 16:50
Kounotori 7: HTV-7	Japan	Logistics	H-IIB	September 22, 2018, 17:52:27	September 27, 2018, 14:09	November 6, 2018, 23:32	40d 9h 23m	November 10, 2018, 21:14

== Leak ==
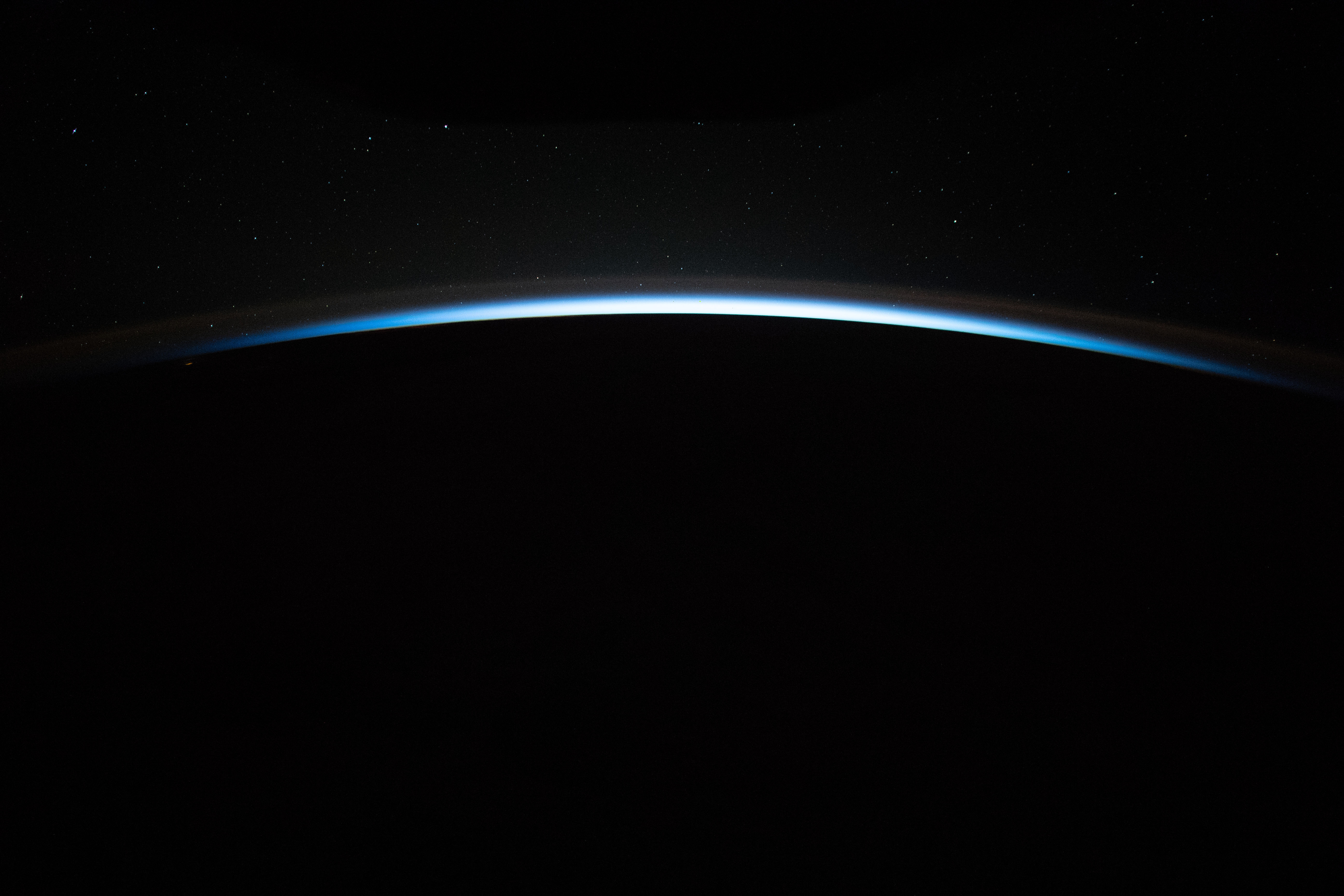
View of Earth taken during ISS Expedition 56 on 13 August 2018 at 17:49:12.

On August 29, 2018, a small leak was detected through a drop in air pressure by the flight controllers. After learning about the leak upon waking up, the astronauts discovered a 2 mm hole in the orbital module of the Soyuz MS-09 spacecraft. The hole was initially repaired with tape, followed by a permanent repair with gauze and epoxy.
