= Soyuz MS-07 =

2017 Russian crewed spaceflight to the ISS

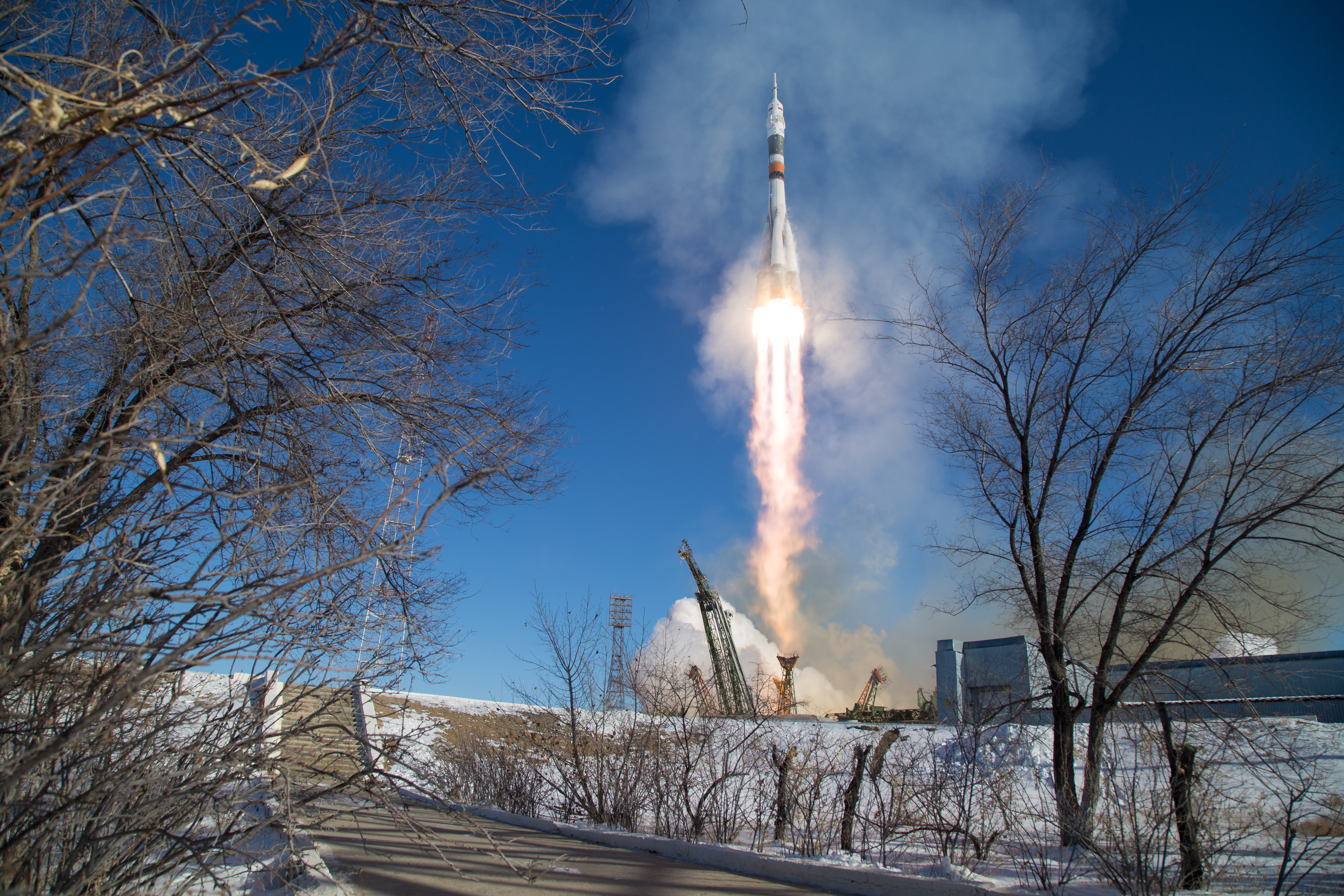
- The launch of Soyuz MS-07
- Mission type: ISS resupply
- Operator: Roscosmos
- COSPAR ID: 2017-081A
- SATCAT no.: 43063
- Mission duration: 168 days 5 hours 18 minutes

Spacecraft properties
- Spacecraft: Soyuz MS
- Spacecraft type: Soyuz-MS 11F747
- Manufacturer: Energia
- Launch mass: 7290 kg

Crew
- Crew size: 3
- Members: Anton Shkaplerov; Scott D. Tingle; Norishige Kanai
- Callsign: Astraeus

Start of mission
- Launch date: 17 December 2017, 07:21 UTC
- Rocket: Soyuz-FG
- Launch site: Baikonur, Site 1/5
- Contractor: RKTs Progress

End of mission
- Landing date: 3 June 2018, 12:39 UTC
- Landing site: Steppes of the Kazakhstan

Orbital parameters
- Reference system: Geocentric orbit
- Regime: Low Earth orbit
- Inclination: 51.66°

Docking with ISS
- Docking port: Rassvet nadir
- Docking date: 19 December 2017, 08:39 UTC
- Undocking date: 3 June 2018, 09:16 UTC
- Time docked: 166 days 0 hour 37 minutes
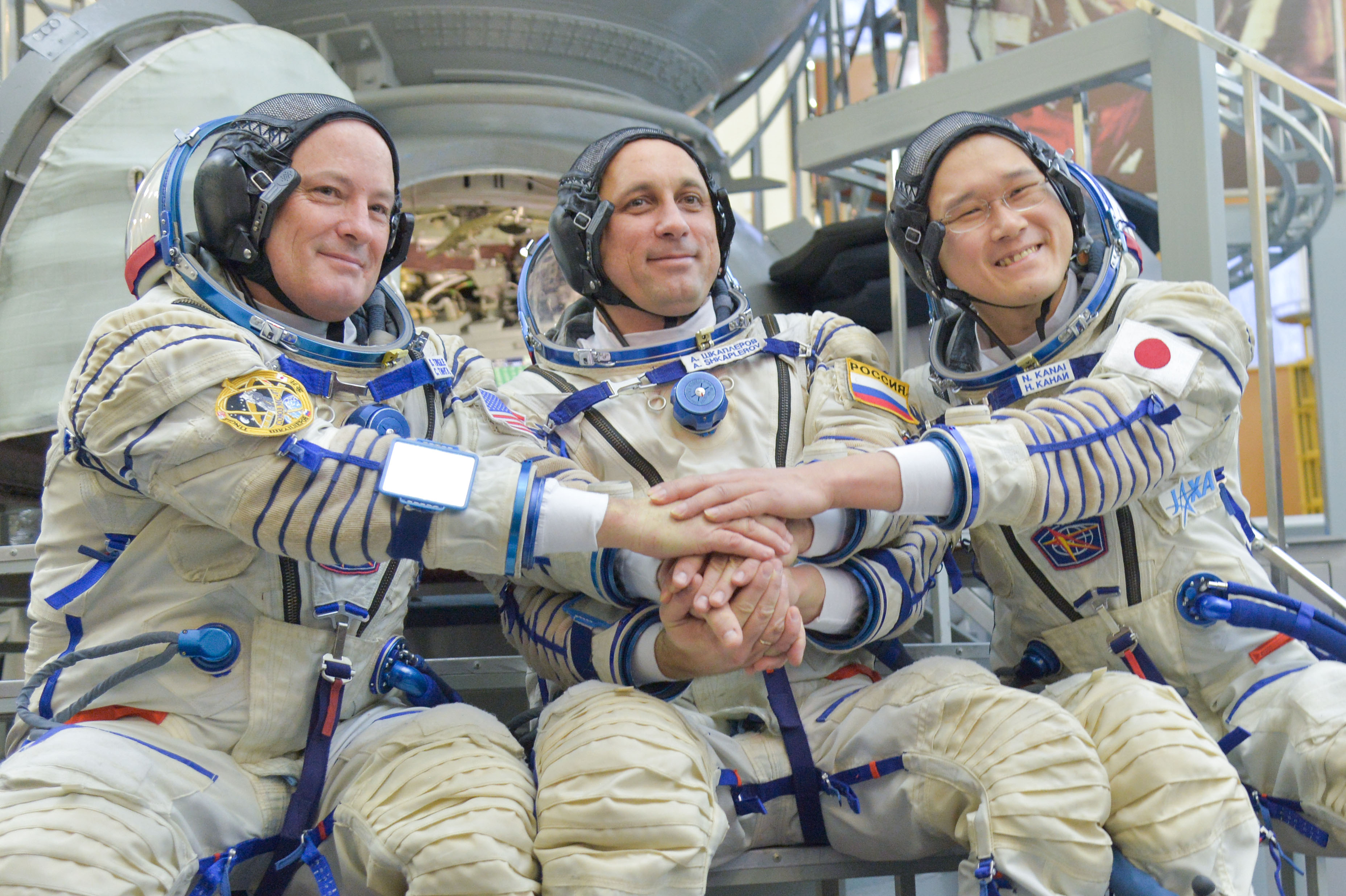
- Mission insignia From left to right: Tingle, Shkaplerov and Kanai Soyuz programme (crewed)

Soyuz MS-07 was a Soyuz spaceflight launched on 17 December 2017 at 07:21 UTC. It transported three members of the Expedition 54 crew to the International Space Station. Soyuz MS-07 was the 136th flight of a Soyuz spacecraft. The crew consisted of a Russian commander, Japanese doctor, and an American flight engineer.

== Crew ==
Prime crew
Position	Crew
Commander	(Russia) Anton Shkaplerov, Roscosmos; Expedition 54; Third spaceflight
Flight engineer	(United States) Scott D. Tingle, NASA; Expedition 54; Only spaceflight
Flight engineer	(Japan) Norishige Kanai, JAXA; Expedition 54; First spaceflight

Backup crew
Position	Crew
Commander	(Russia) Sergey Prokopyev, Roscosmos
Flight engineer	(Germany) Alexander Gerst, ESA
Flight engineer	(United States) Jeanette Epps, NASA

=== Crew notes ===
Originally Russian cosmonaut Aleksandr Skvortsov was to have commanded the mission, although he was removed from the flight crew and pushed back to Soyuz MS-13 due to a temporary medical issue, Shkaplerov was brought off the backup crew and replaced him as Soyuz commander and ISS commander for Expedition 55.

== Mission ==
Media related to Soyuz MS-07 at Wikimedia Commons

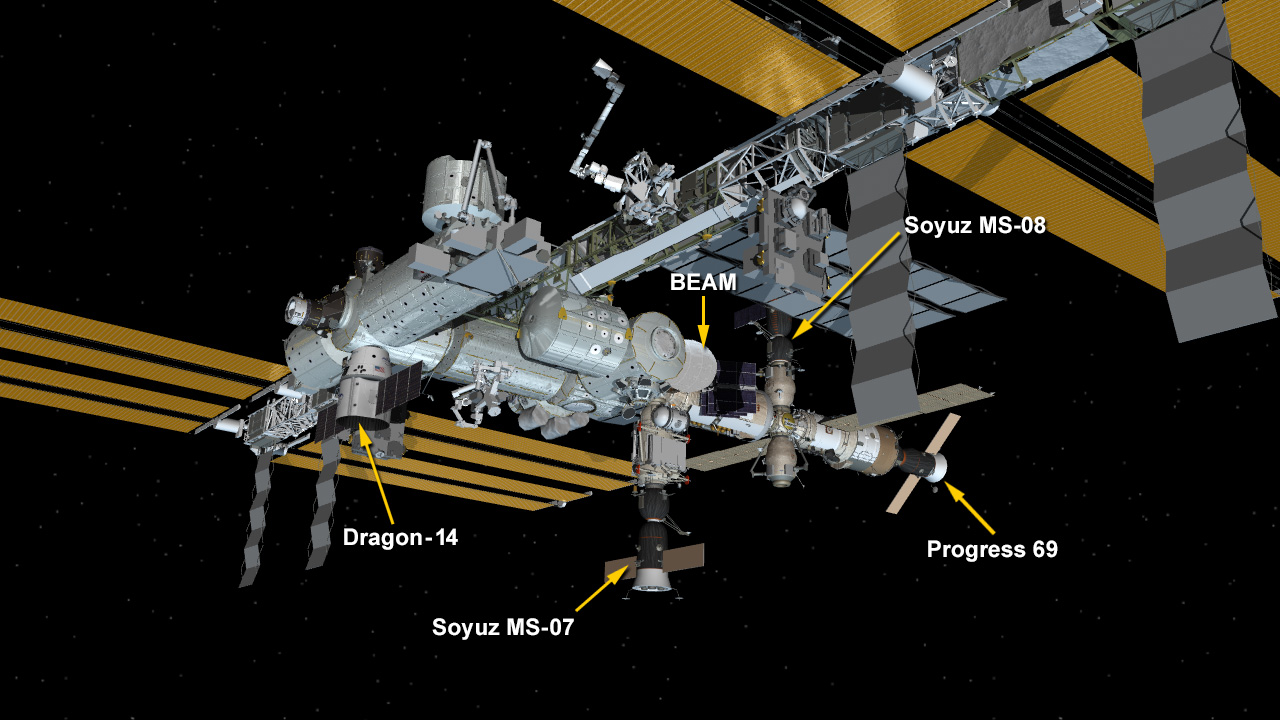
International Space Station configuration. Four spaceships are docked including the SpaceX Dragon CRS-14 ISS resupply, the Progress MS-08 resupply ship and the Soyuz MS-07 and Soyuz MS-08 crew ships.

The Soyuz spacecraft was carrying Scott Tingle of NASA, Anton Shkaplerov of the Russian space agency Roscosmos, and Norishige Kanai of the Japan Aerospace Exploration Agency (JAXA). The arrival of Tingle, Shkaplerov, and Kanai restored the station's crew complement to six. They have joined Expedition 54 Commander Alexander Misurkin of Roscosmos and his crewmates, Mark T. Vande Hei and Joe Acaba of NASA. The crew members spent more than four months conducting approximately 250 science investigations in fields such as biology, Earth science, human research, physical sciences, and technology development. Vande Hei, Acaba, and Misurkin are remain aboard the station until February 2018, and Tingle, Shkaplerov, and Kanai have returned to Earth in June 2018.

This crew continues the long-term increase in crew size on the U.S. segment from three to four, allowing NASA to maximize time dedicated to research on the space station. Highlights of upcoming investigations include the benefits of manufacturing fiber optic filaments in a microgravity environment, a new study looking at structures that are vital to the design of advanced optical materials and electronic devices, and examining a drug compound and drug delivery system designed to combat muscular breakdown in space or during other prolonged periods of disuse, such as extended bed rest on Earth. For more than 17 years, humans have lived and worked continuously aboard the station, advancing scientific knowledge and demonstrating new technologies, making research breakthroughs not possible on Earth that will enable long-duration human and robotic exploration into deep space. A global endeavor, more than 200 people from 18 countries have visited the unique microgravity laboratory that has hosted more than 2,100 research investigations from researchers in more than 95 countries.
