= Norishige Kanai =

Japanese doctor and astronaut (born 1976)

- 金井 宣茂
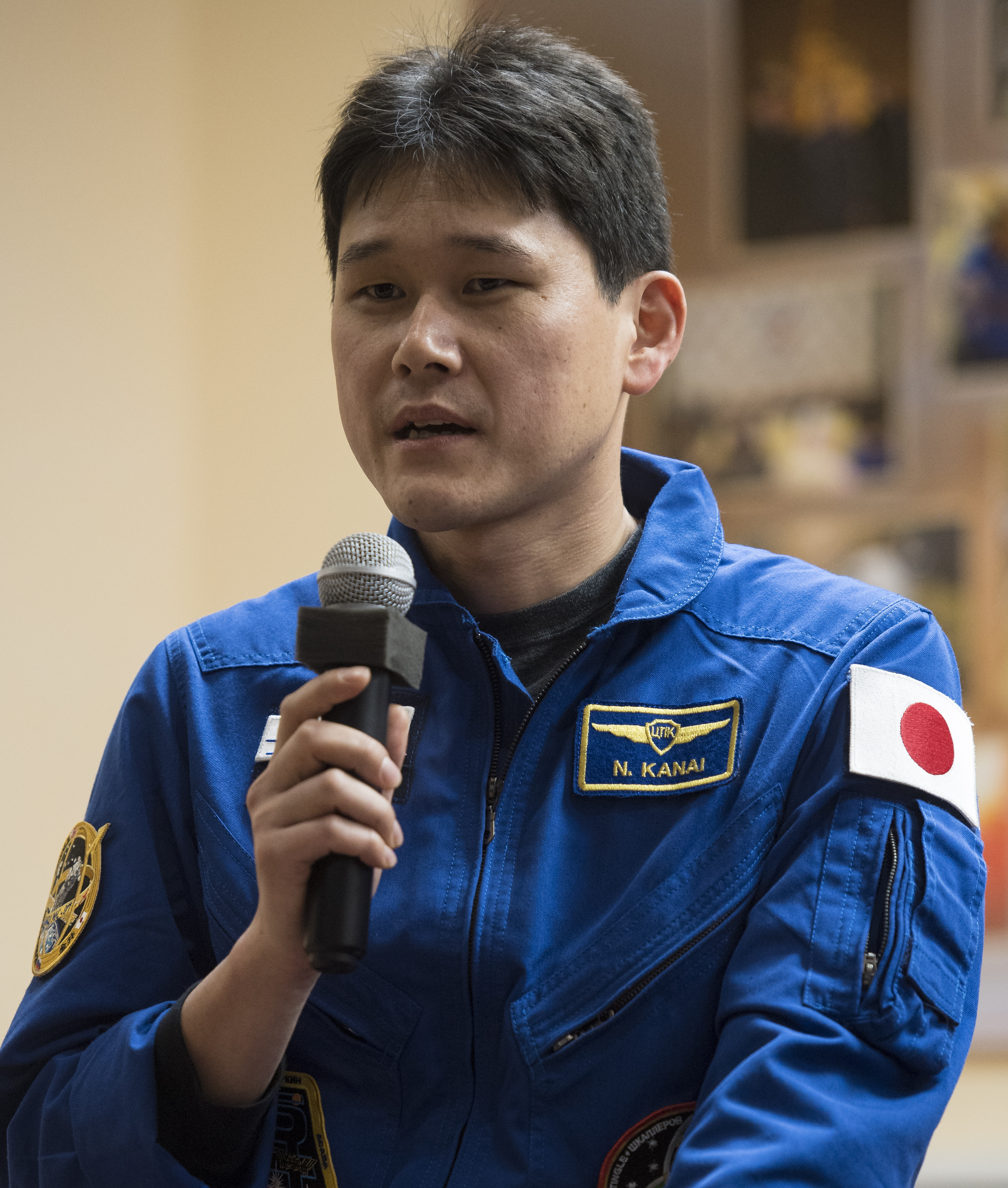
- Kanai at the Expedition 54 press conference in December 2017
- Born: December 5, 1976 (age 49); Tokyo, Japan
- Occupation: Physician
- Space career

JAXA astronaut
- Status: Active
- Rank: Lieutenant, JMSDF
- Time in space: 168 days, 5 hours, 18 minutes
- Selection: 2009 JAXA Group; NASA Group 20 (2009)
- Total EVAs: 1
- Total EVA time: 5 hours, 57 minutes
- Missions: Soyuz MS-07 (Expedition 54/55)

Norishige Kanai (金井 宣茂, Kanai Norishige; born 5 December 1976) is a Japanese doctor and JAXA astronaut.

He is a lieutenant and Diving Medical Officer in the Japan Maritime Self-Defense Force (Medical Service Division, 1st Service School). He served as a crew member on board the International Space Station for Expedition 54/55, and returned to Earth on June 3, 2018.

== Personal life ==
Kanai graduated from Toho High School, Chiba, Japan, in 1995. He received an M.D. degree from National Defense Medical College in 2002.

He enjoys Iaidō and other Japanese traditional martial arts, scuba diving, and traveling.

He is a member of the Japan Surgical Society and the Japanese Society of Hyperbaric and Undersea Medicine.

== Career ==
Kanai was commissioned from the National Defense Medical College in 2002. From 2002 to 2004, he worked in the Department of Surgery at the National Defense Medical College Hospital. In 2004, he was assigned to Japan Self Defense Force Ohminato Hospital, Aomori, Japan. He completed the Diving Medicine Course and qualified as a Diving Medical Officer in 2004. He also completed the U.S. Navy Diving Medical Officer’s Course as an international military student at the Naval Diving & Salvage Training Center, Florida, and qualified as a Navy diver in 2006. From 2006 to 2008, he worked in the Department of Surgery at the National Defense Medical College Hospital. He was transferred to Japan Self Defense Force Hospital Kure, Hiroshima, Japan, in 2008. Kanai worked at the JMSDF 1st Service School from June to September 2009.

== JAXA career ==
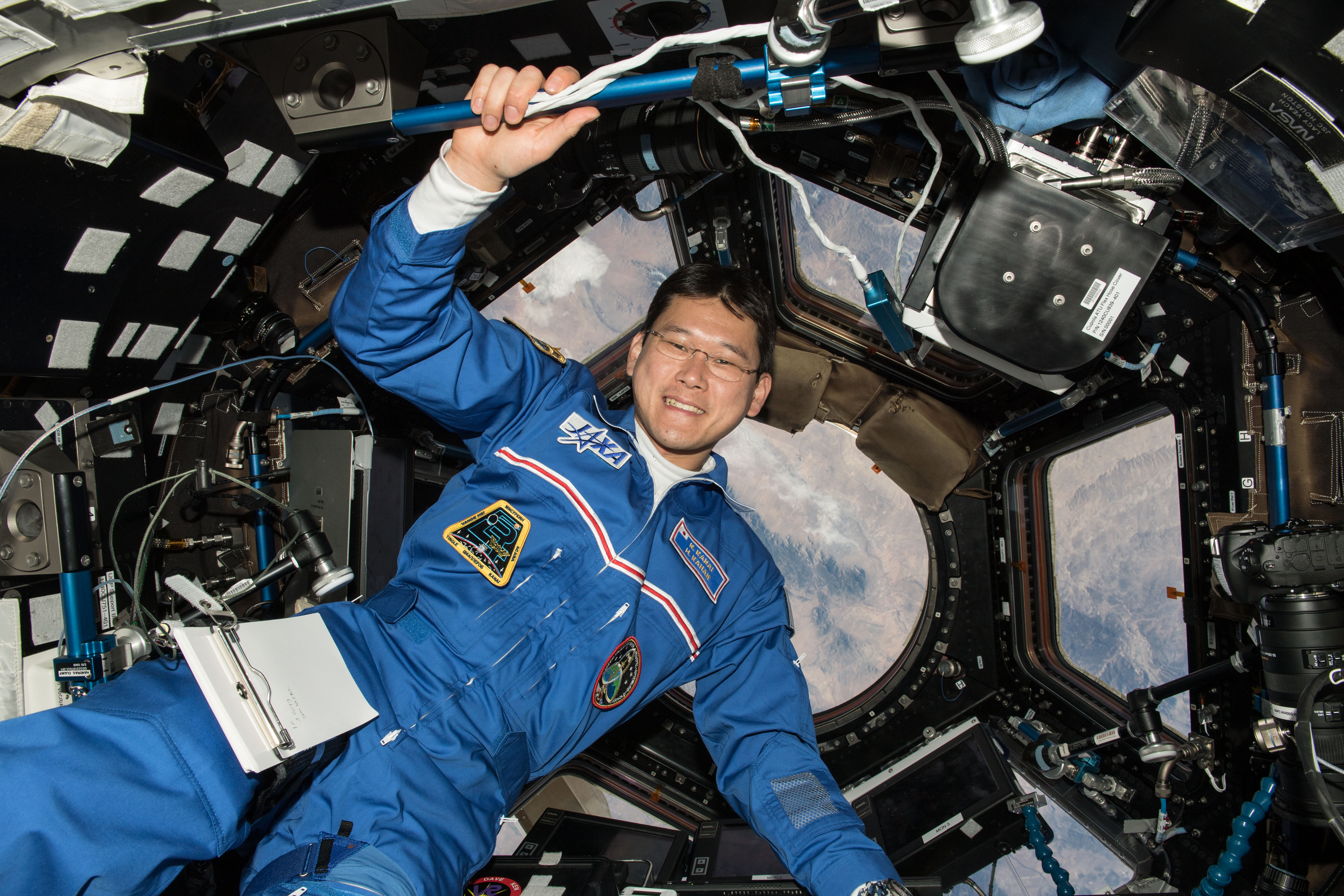
Norishige Kanai inside the International Space Station's seven-windowed cupola in 2017

After his selection as an astronaut candidate by JAXA in September 2009, Kanai arrived at Johnson Space Center later that month for NASA astronaut training. As one of the fourteen members of the 20th NASA astronaut class, he participated in Astronaut Candidate Training which includes scientific and technical briefings, intensive instruction in ISS systems, Extravehicular Activity (EVA), robotics, physiological training, T-38 Talon flight training, and water and wilderness survival training. Kanai was certified as an ISS astronaut in July 2011.

In 2011, Kanai served as cavenaut into the ESA CAVES training in Sardinia, alongside Thomas Pesquet, Tim Peake, Sergey Ryzhikov, and Randolph Bresnik.

In July 2015, he participated as an aquanaut in the NEEMO 20 crew.

=== Expedition 54/55 ===
In August 2015, JAXA announced his selection to the crew of Expedition 54/55 to the International Space Station, scheduled for launch in December 2017. Kanai was launched on into space onboard Soyuz MS-07 on December 17, 2017 07:21 UTC.

In January 2018 Kanai received publicity after mistakenly tweeting that he had grown "as much as 9 cm" taller due to the absence of gravity. Microgravity allows the vertebrae in astronauts' spines to spread apart; typical growth for astronauts in zero-gravity is two to five centimeters. A 9 cm growth spurt might hypothetically create problems, as the Soyuz spacecraft to take astronauts back to Earth has a limit on seating height. However, later Kanai remeasured and tweeted that he had apparently grown only 2 cm, saying "it was a measurement mistake (?)" [sic].
