= Alexander Gerst =

German astronaut and geophysicist (born 1976)

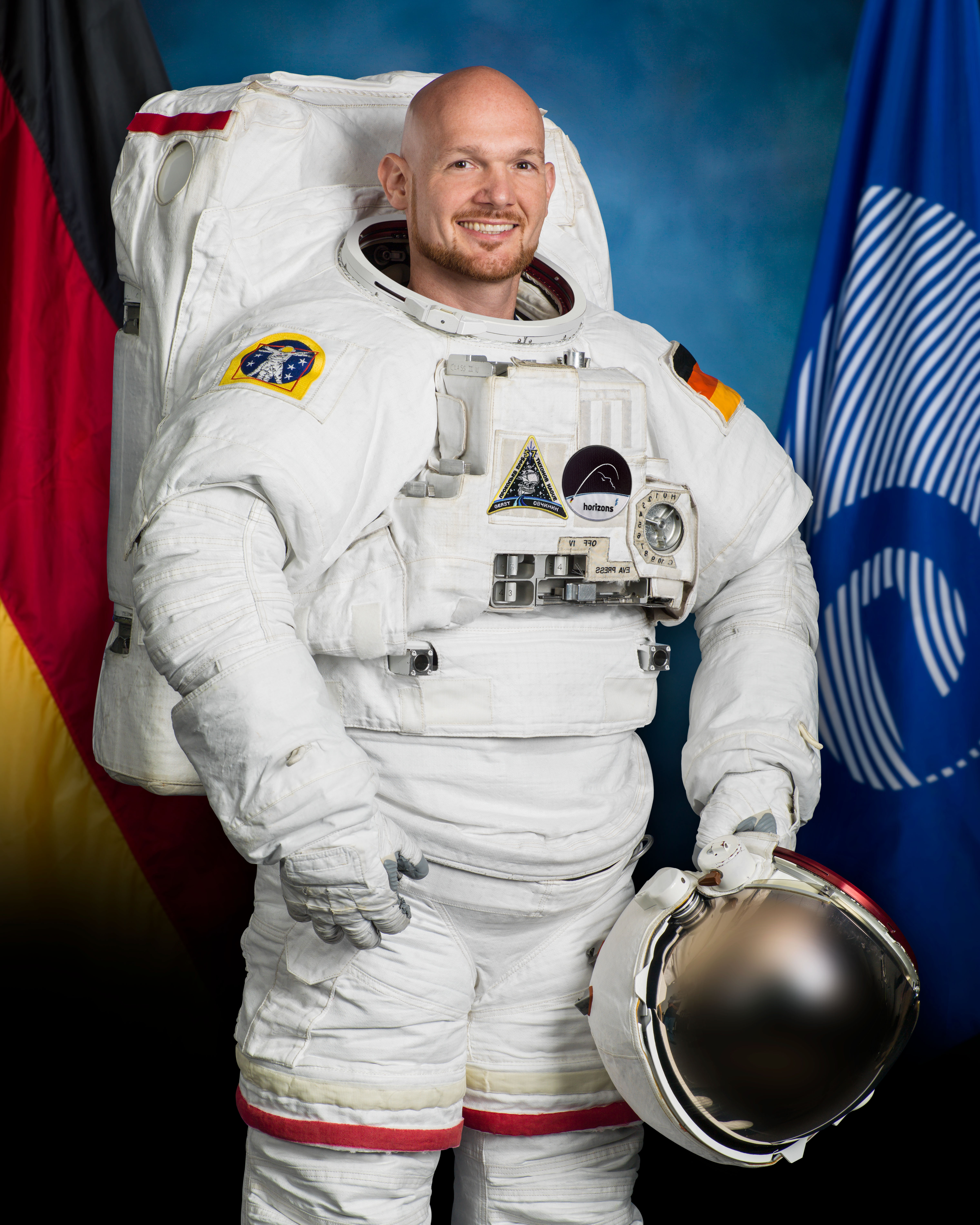
- Official portrait, 2017
- Born: 3 May 1976 (age 50); Künzelsau, Baden-Württemberg, West Germany
- Occupation: Geophysicist
- Awards: Bernd Rendel Prize
- Space career

ESA astronaut
- Status: Active
- Time in space: 362 days, 1 hour, 50 minutes
- Selection: 2009 ESA Group
- Total EVAs: 1
- Total EVA time: 6 hours, 13 minutes
- Missions: Soyuz TMA-13M (Expedition 40/41); Soyuz MS-09 (Expedition 56/57)
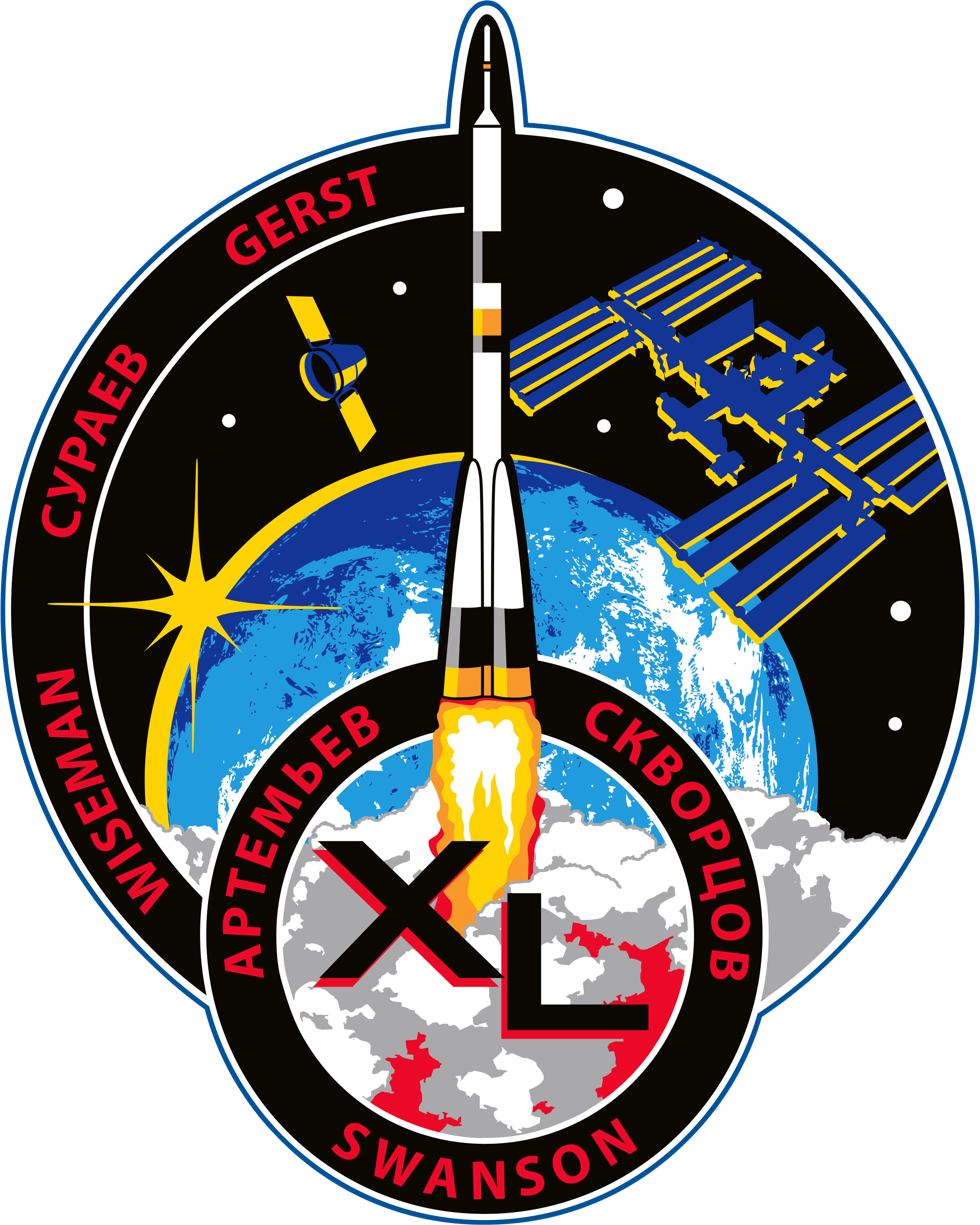
- Mission insignia
- Website: alexandergerst.esa.int

Alexander Gerst (born 3 May 1976) is a German European Space Agency (ESA) astronaut and geophysicist, who was selected in 2009 to take part in space training. He was part of the International Space Station Expedition 40 and 41 from May to November 2014. Gerst returned to space on 6 June 2018, as part of Expedition 56/57. He was the commander of the International Space Station. He returned to Earth on 20 December 2018. After the end of his second mission and before being surpassed by Luca Parmitano in 2020, he held the record for most time in space of any active ESA astronaut (362 days), succeeding Italian astronaut Paolo Nespoli, and German ESA astronaut Thomas Reiter, who formally held the record for the longest time in space for any active or retired ESA astronaut.

== Education and research ==
Gerst graduated from the Technical High School in Öhringen, Germany, in 1995. While in high school, he volunteered as a scout leader, firefighter, and water rescue lifeguard.

Gerst studied at the University of Karlsruhe (now Karlsruhe Institute of Technology), Germany, where he received a degree in geophysics with distinction.

From 1998 to 2003 Gerst participated in several international scientific collaborations and field experiments, including some in remote locations such as Antarctica.

From 2001 to 2003, Gerst studied for a master's degree in earth sciences at Victoria University of Wellington in New Zealand. While researching his master's thesis, he developed volcano monitoring techniques that might improve forecasts of volcanic eruptions. His results were published in Science Magazine.

Gerst worked as a researcher at the Institute of Geophysics at the University of Hamburg between 2004 and 2009, and received his doctorate in natural sciences from the University of Hamburg in 2010, with a dissertation on geophysics and volcanic eruption dynamics at Mount Erebus volcano in Antarctica.

In 2007 Gerst received the Bernd Rendel award for outstanding research from the German Research Foundation (DFG). He has published several papers, including one in Nature.

== In ESA ==
Gerst was selected as an astronaut in 2009 by the European Space Agency.

In September 2019, he participated in the ESA CAVES mission of the European Space Agency alongside Janette Epps, Takuya Onishi, Joshua Kutryk, Joe Acaba and Nikolay Chub.

In 2022, he participated in the ESA PANGAEA training course, in its sessions in Bletterbach (ITA), Nordlingen-Ries (GER) and Lanzarote (SPA) together with NASA astronaut Stephanie Wilson and in the Lofoten session together with ESA astronaut Samantha Cristoforetti.

=== Expedition 40/41 ===
He visited space as part of the Expedition 40/41 International Space Station crew from May to November 2014. On 7 October 2014, Gerst performed his first extravehicular activity (EVA) with Reid Wiseman. The astronauts moved a failed cooling pump from temporary to long-term storage on the station's truss. They also installed a new relay system that will provide backup power options to the mobile transporter, which moves the large robotic arm around the out outside of the space station. The duration of the EVA was 6 hours and 13 minutes.

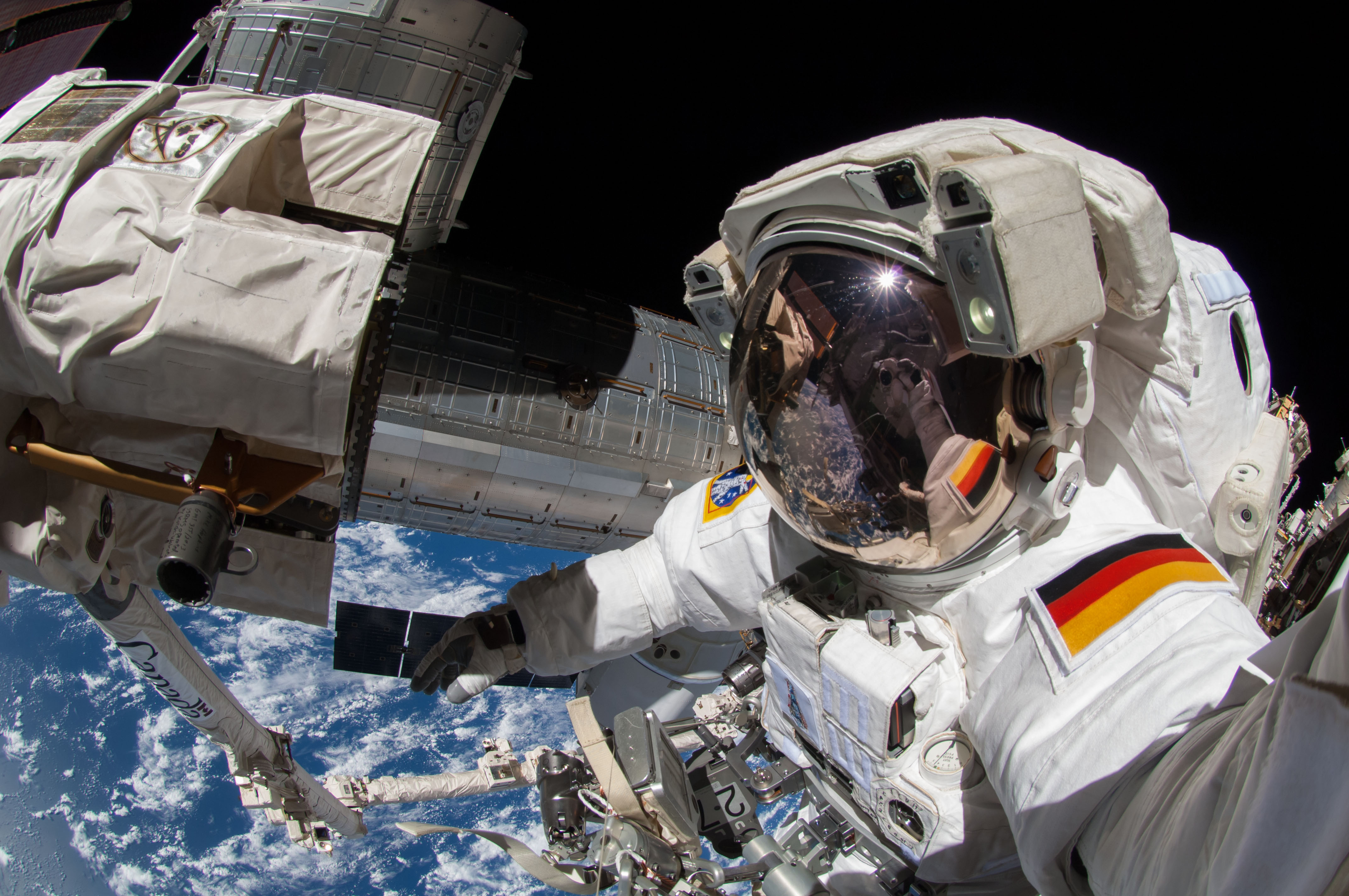
Gerst pictured during his first EVA

On 10 November 2014, he landed on Earth in the same Soyuz TMA-13M spacecraft that flew him to the International Space Station on 28 May along with Russian commander Maxim Suraev and NASA astronaut Reid Wiseman.

Gerst's six-month mission to the ISS was named "Blue Dot". The mission's name is reminiscent of Carl Sagan's description of Earth as a Pale Blue Dot as seen on a photograph taken by NASA's Voyager mission.

The mission experiments included experiments in physical science, biology, human physiology, radiation research, and technology demonstrations. Educational outreach included educational videos as part of the "flying classroom" and set of experiments performed in microgravity.

=== Expedition 56/57 ===
Gerst launched his second tour to the ISS on Soyuz MS-09 on 6 June 2018, as part of Expedition 56/57. He is the commander of the ISS for Expedition 57. He will bring a robot assistant called "CIMON". He was the second European Space Agency astronaut to command the station, after Frank de Winne commanded Expedition 21, and also the youngest astronaut to command the station, at age 42 as of October 2018. In May 2017, his mission name and logo were announced, called "Horizons".

On 20 July 2018, while on the ISS, Gerst took part in a live concert by the German electronic music group Kraftwerk in the German city of Stuttgart. He addressed the audience and played a synthesizer during the performance of the song "Spacelab".

On 20 December 2018, he and his crewmates Serena Aunon-Chancellor and Sergey Prokopyev returned to Earth and landed in Kazakhstan after 197 days in space, combined with the 165 days in space on his last mission, Gerst has 362 days in space, more than any other ESA astronaut in history. In 2020, Luca Parmitano surpassed this record with 367 days in space.

== Personal life ==
Gerst is single, and in his spare time he enjoys mountaineering, diving, climbing and skydiving. Gerst is a licensed radio amateur (KF5ONO) and has participated in several ARISS (Amateur Radio on the International Space Station) educational contacts.

== In popular culture ==
Some of Gerst's background and appearance is incorporated into the character of Alex Vogel, a German astronaut and part of the crew of the Hermes vessel in the 2015 science-fiction film The Martian.

Preceded by Andrew Feustel	ISS Commander (Expedition 57); 3 October to 20 December 2018	Succeeded by Oleg Kononenko
