= Expedition 54 =

54th expedition to the International Space Station

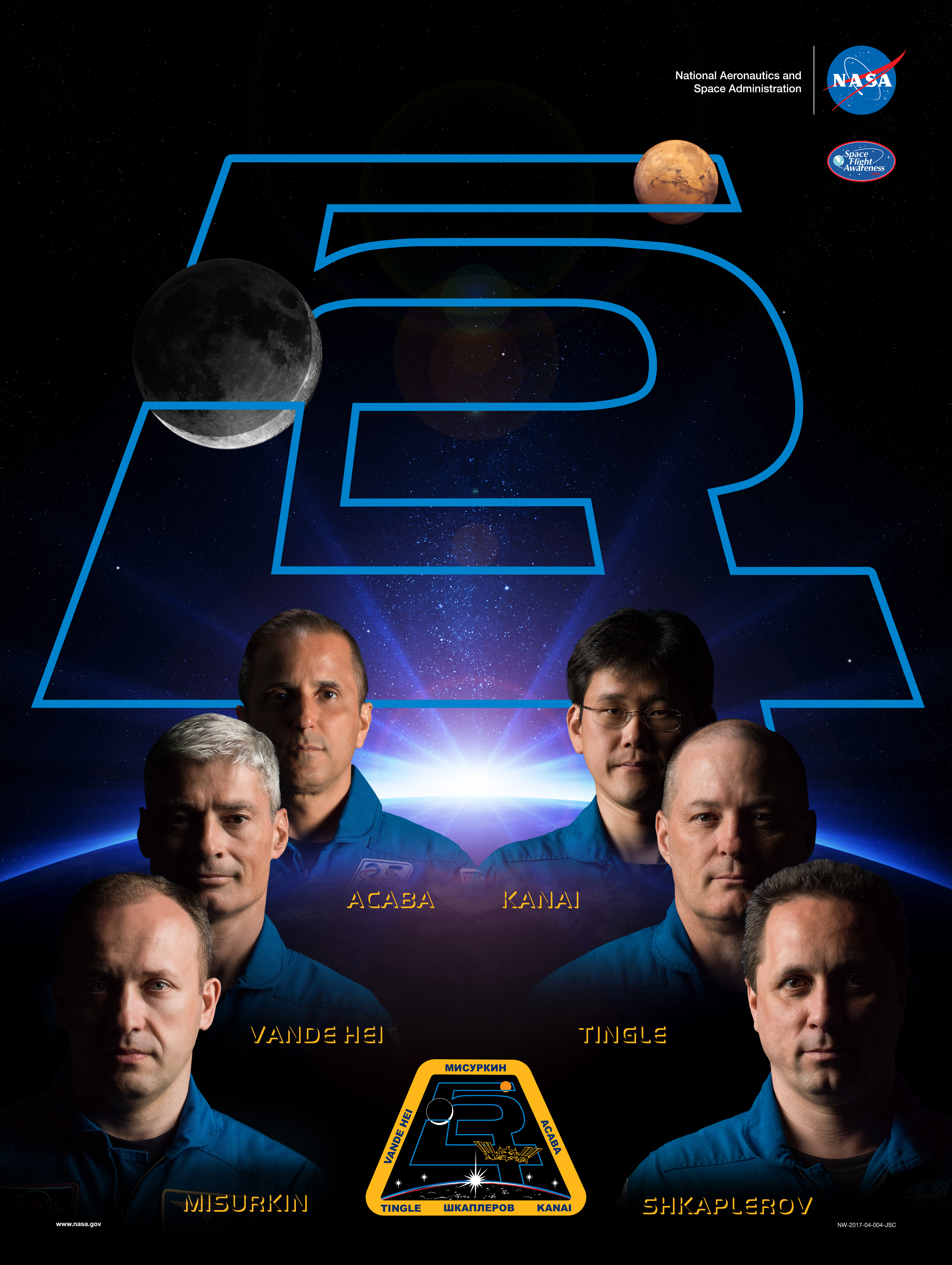
- Promotional Poster
- Mission type: Long-duration expedition

Expedition
- Space station: International Space Station
- Began: 14 December 2017 UTC
- Ended: 27 February 2018 UTC
- Arrived aboard: Soyuz MS-06; Soyuz MS-07
- Departed aboard: Soyuz MS-06; Soyuz MS-07

Crew
- Crew size: 6
- Members: Expedition 53/54: Alexander Misurkin; Mark T. Vande Hei; Joseph M. Acaba; Expedition 54/55: Anton Shkaplerov; Scott D. Tingle; Norishige Kanai
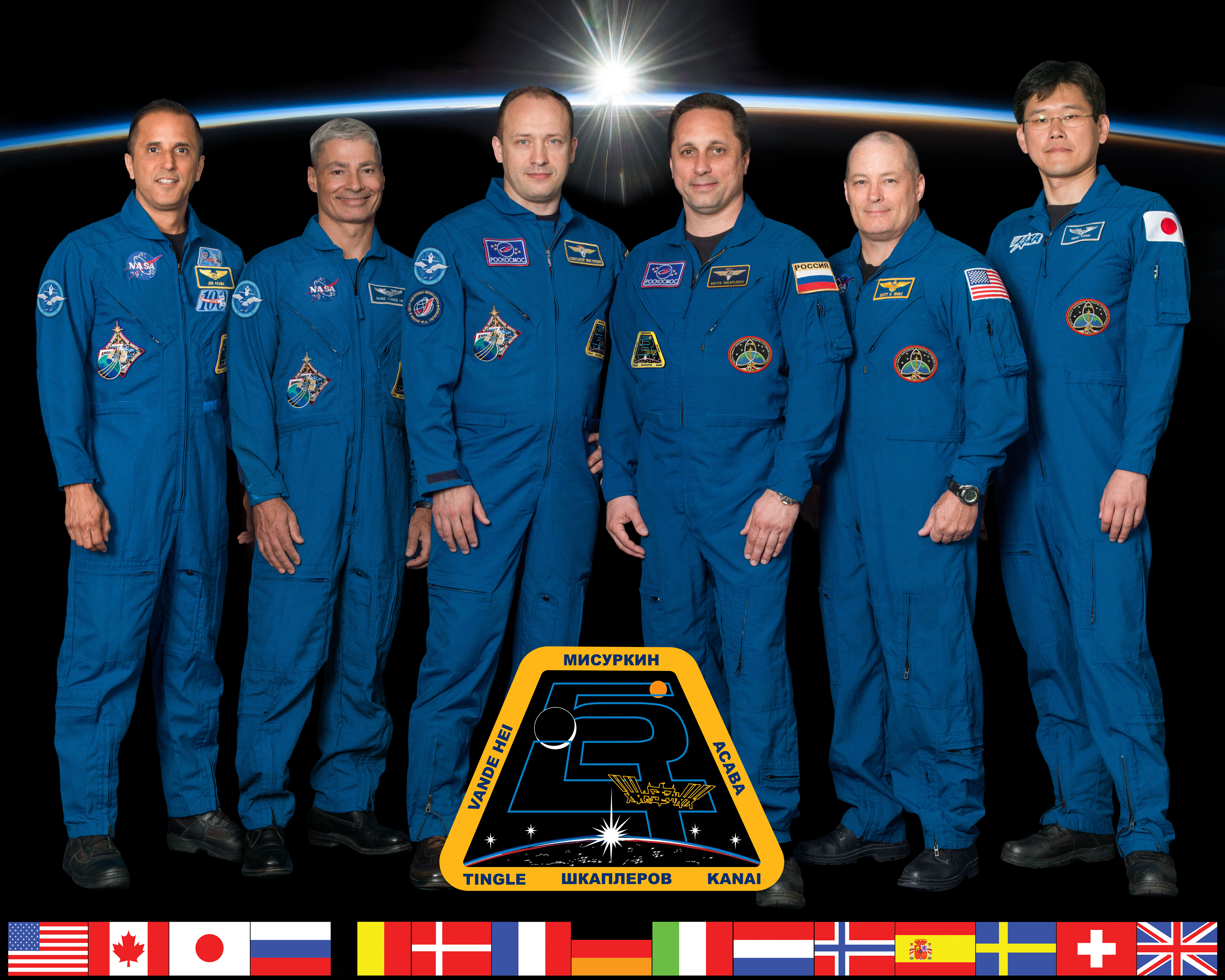
- Expedition 54 mission patch (l-r) Acaba, Vande Hei, Misurkin, Shkaplerov, Tingle, and Kanai ISS expeditions

Expedition 54 was the 54th expedition to the International Space Station, which began upon the departure of Soyuz MS-05 on December 14, 2017 and concluded upon the departure of Soyuz MS-06 on February 27, 2018. Alexander Misurkin, Mark Vande Hei and Joseph Acaba were transferred from Expedition 53, with Alexander Misurkin taking the commander role. Transfer of Command from Expedition 54 to Expedition 55 was done on February 26, 2018. Expedition 54 officially ended on February 27, 2018 23:08 UTC, with the undocking of Soyuz MS-06.

== Crew ==
| Position | First Part (December 14, 2017 to December 17, 2017) | Second Part (December 17, 2017 to February 27, 2018) |
|---|---|---|
| Commander | Alexander Misurkin, RSA; Second spaceflight | |
| Flight engineer | Mark T. Vande Hei, NASA; First spaceflight | |
| Flight engineer | Joseph M. Acaba, NASA; Third spaceflight | |
| Flight engineer | | Anton Shkaplerov, RSA; Third spaceflight |
| Flight engineer | | Scott D. Tingle, NASA; First spaceflight |
| Flight engineer | | Norishige Kanai, JAXA; First spaceflight |

== Spacewalks ==
| EVA # | Spacewalkers | Start (UTC) | End (UTC) | Duration | Notes |
|---|---|---|---|---|---|
| Expedition 54; EVA 1 | Mark T. Vande Hei; Scott D. Tingle | January 23, 2018; 11:49 | January 23, 2018; 19:13 | 7 hours 24 minutes | Replaced Latching End Effector (LEE-B) on Canadarm2, Installed failed LEE on ESP2, Replaced LEE Camera, Replaced EVA Socket. |
| Expedition 54; EVA 2* | Alexander Misurkin; Anton Shkaplerov | February 2, 2018; 15:34 | February 2, 2018; 23:47 | 8 hours 13 minutes | Remove and replacement of an electronics box for a high-gain communications antenna on the Zvezda service module. |
| Expedition 54; EVA 3 | Mark T. Vande Hei; Norishige Kanai | February 16, 2018; 12:00 | February 16, 2018; 17:57 | 5 hours 57 minutes | Finished removal and replacement of Latching End Effector on POA, Replaced LEE Camera, Installed Ground Strap on Canadarm2, Brought failed LEE inside, Lubricated Canadarm2, Moved Tool Platform on Dextre, Adjusted Struts on Flex Hose Rotary Coupler. |

*denotes spacewalks performed from the Pirs docking compartment in Russian Orlan suits.
All other spacewalks were performed from the Quest airlock.

== Uncrewed spaceflights to the ISS ==
Resupply missions that visited the International Space Station during Expedition 54:

| Spacecraft: ISS flight number | Country | Mission | Launcher | Launch (UTC) | Docked/Berthed (UTC) ^{†} | Undocked/Unberthed (UTC) | Duration (Docked) | Deorbit |
|---|---|---|---|---|---|---|---|---|
| CRS SpX-13 | United States | Logistics | Falcon 9 | 15 Dec 2017, 15:36:00 | 17 Dec 2017, 10:57 | 13 Jan 2018, 09:58 | 26d 23h 1m | 13 Jan 2018, 14:43 |
| Progress MS-08: ISS 69P | Russia | Logistics | Soyuz-2.1a | 13 Feb 2018, 08:13:33 | 15 Feb 2018, 10:38 | 23 Aug 2018, 02:16 | 188d 15h 38m | 30 Aug 2018 |
