= Richard R. Arnold =

American educator and NASA astronaut (born 1963)

Ricky Arnold
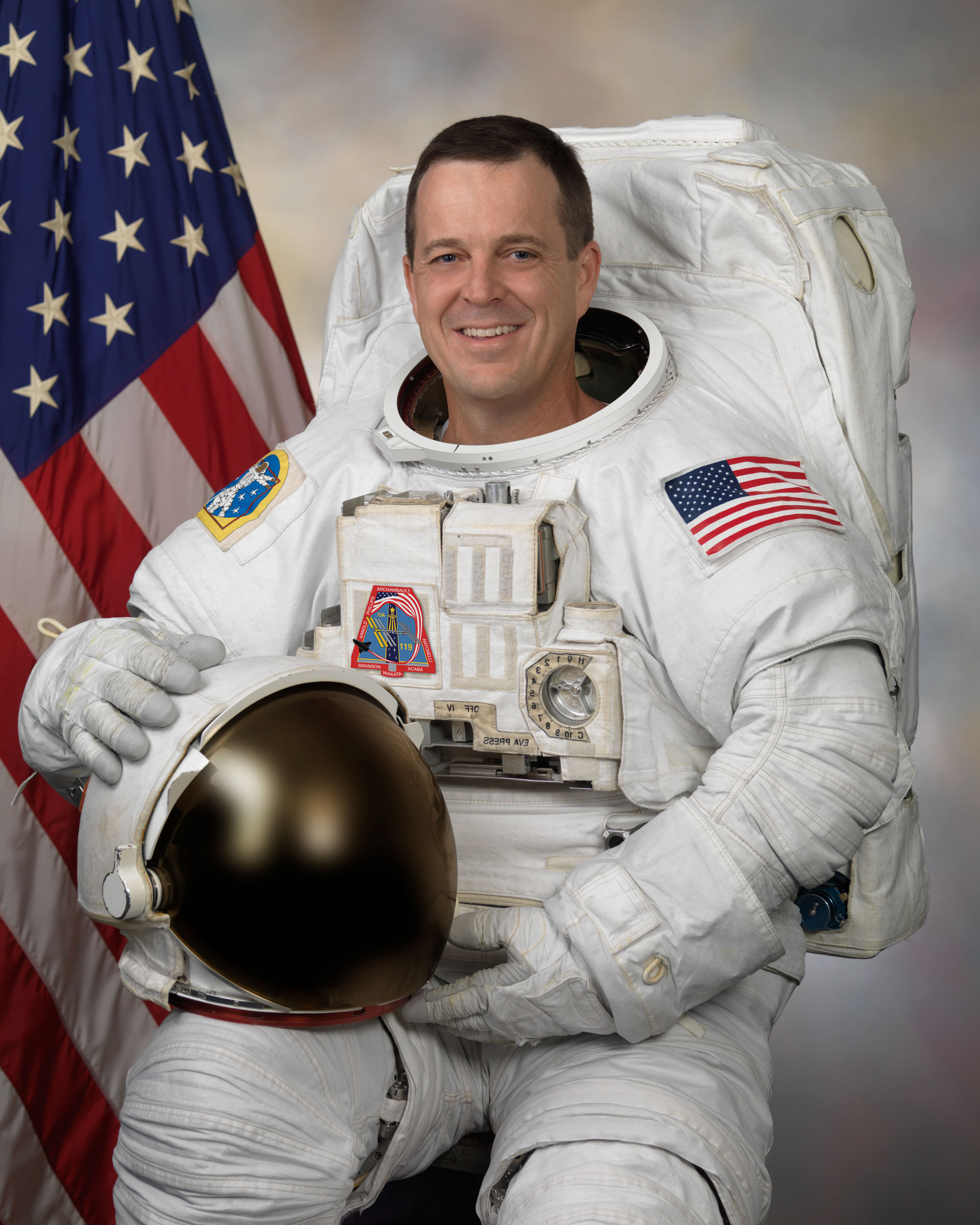
- Born: Richard Robert Arnold II; November 26, 1963 (age 62); Cheverly, Maryland, U.S.
- Education: Frostburg State University (BS); University of Maryland, College Park (MS)
- Space career

NASA astronaut
- Time in space: 209d 13h 29m
- Selection: NASA Group 19 (2004)
- Total EVAs: 5
- Total EVA time: 32h 4m
- Mission: STS-119; Soyuz MS-08 (Expedition 55/56)
- Retired: 2025

Richard Robert Arnold II (born November 26, 1963, in Cheverly, Maryland) is an American educator and a former NASA astronaut. He flew on Space Shuttle mission STS-119, which launched March 15, 2009 and delivered the final set of solar arrays to the International Space Station. He launched again in 2018 to the ISS onboard Soyuz MS-08.

Arnold was raised in Bowie, Maryland and is married to Eloise Miller Arnold of Bowie. They have two daughters.

== Education ==
- Bowie High School, Bowie, Maryland, 1981.
- B.S., Accounting, Frostburg State University, Maryland, 1985.
- Completed teacher certification program at Frostburg State University, Maryland, 1988.
- M.S., Marine, Estuarine, & Environmental Sciences, University of Maryland, 1992.

== Organizations ==
- National Science Teachers Association
- International Technology Education Association
- National Council of Teachers of Mathematics

== Career ==
Arnold began working at the United States Naval Academy in 1987 as an Oceanographic Technician. Upon completing his teacher certification program, he accepted a position as a science teacher at John Hanson Middle School in Waldorf, Maryland. During his tenure, he completed a Masters program while conducting research in biostratigraphy at the Horn Point Environmental Laboratory in Cambridge, Maryland. Upon matriculation, Arnold spent another year working in the Marine Sciences including time at the Cape Cod National Seashore and aboard a sail training/oceanographic vessel headquartered in Woods Hole, Massachusetts. In 1993, Arnold joined the faculty at the Casablanca American School in Casablanca, Morocco, teaching college preparatory Biology and Marine Environmental Science. During that time, he began presenting workshops at various international education conferences focusing on science teaching methodologies. In 1996, he and his family moved to Riyadh, Saudi Arabia, where he was employed as a middle and high school science teacher at the American International School. In 2001, Arnold was hired by International Schools Services to teach middle school mathematics and science at the International School of Kuala Kencana operated by PT Freeport Indonesia in West Papua, Indonesia. In 2003, he accepted a similar teaching position at the American International School of Bucharest in Bucharest, Romania. Arnold was the guest of honor at the Bowie High School Class of 2009 graduation, delivering the commencement speech.

== NASA career ==
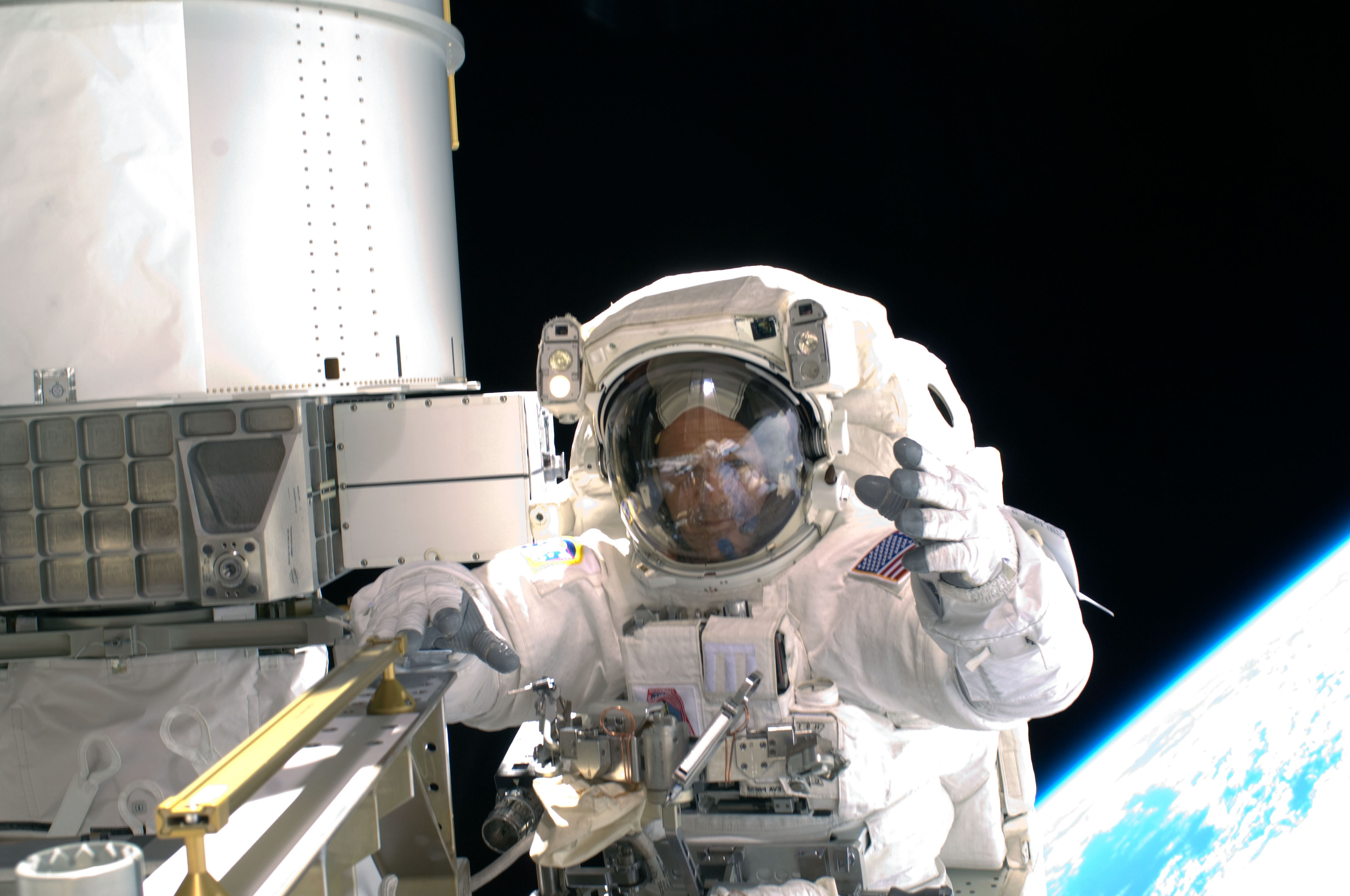
STS-119 Mission Specialist Arnold during his first spacewalk

Arnold was selected as a Mission Specialist-Educator by NASA in May 2004. In February 2006 he completed Astronaut Candidate Training that included scientific and technical briefings, intensive instruction in Shuttle and International Space Station systems, physiological training, T-38 flight training, and water and wilderness survival training. Upon completion of his training, Arnold was assigned to the Hardware Integration Team in the Space Station Branch working on technical issues with JAXA hardware. He worked on various technical assignments until he was assigned to the STS-119 spaceflight.

In August 2007, Arnold served as an aquanaut during the NEEMO 13 project, an exploration research mission held in Aquarius, the world's only undersea research laboratory. On September 19, 2011, NASA announced that Arnold would participate in the NEEMO 15 mission in October 2011 from the DeepWorker submersible. The DeepWorker is a small submarine used as an underwater stand-in for the Space Exploration Vehicle, which might someday be used to explore the surface of an asteroid. In 2016 Arnold participated in ESA CAVES training in Sardinia (Italy) spending six nights underground simulating a mission exploring another planet.

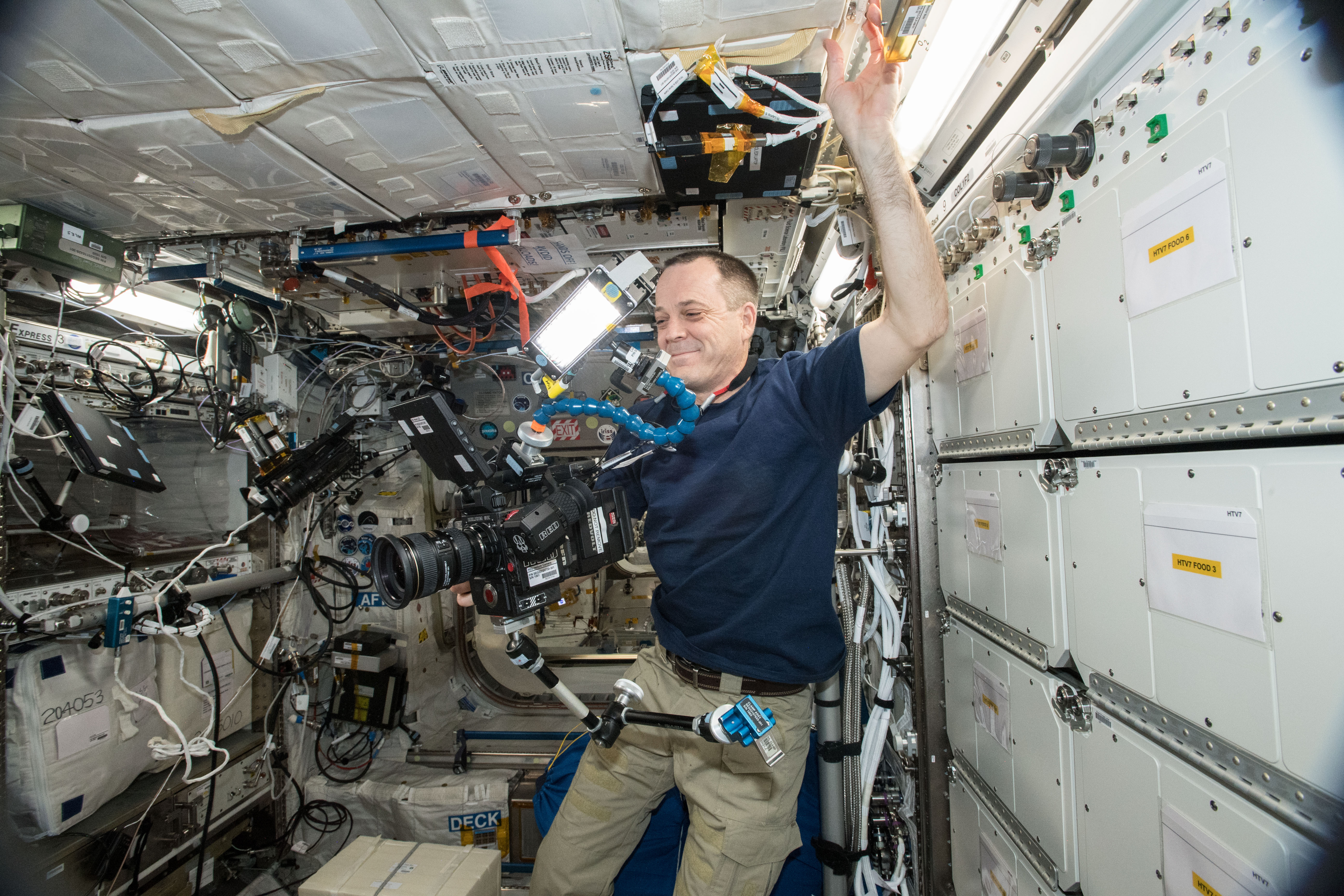
NASA astronaut Ricky Arnold does some filming on the International Space Station October the 3rd, 2018 with a Helium 8K Red Digital Cinema Camera

=== STS-119 ===
Arnold participated in two spacewalks during the STS-119 mission. The first EVA by Steven Swanson and Arnold occurred on March 19, 2009, with a duration of 6 hours 7 minutes. After Canadarm2 was released S6 and moved away, the spacewalkers plugged in power and data cables to connect the new hardware. The two spacewalkers also removed launch locks, stowed a keel pin, removed and jettisoned four thermal covers, and deployed the blanket boxes that hold the solar arrays in place during launch. The first spacewalk was devoted to installing the station's new truss segment and preparing the segment's solar arrays for unfolding on the eighth day of the mission. Arnold performed his second EVA on March 23, 2009, with Joseph Acaba with a duration of 6 hours 27 minutes, to move one of the station's two Crew and Equipment and Translation Aid - or CETA - carts. The carts were moved to the port side of the station's truss during the previous mission to give the robotic arm's mobile transporter the best possible access to the starboard truss for the installation of the new truss segment and solar arrays. With that work done, one of the carts was moved back to the station's port side, leaving a cart for use on either side of the truss. The CETA-cart also got a new coupler. The EVA also included lubricating the end effector capture snares on the station's robot arm - similar to what was done to the other end on an STS-126 spacewalk in late 2008. This has been proven to prevent the snare from snagging or not returning snugly into its groove inside the latching mechanism.

=== Expedition 55/56 ===
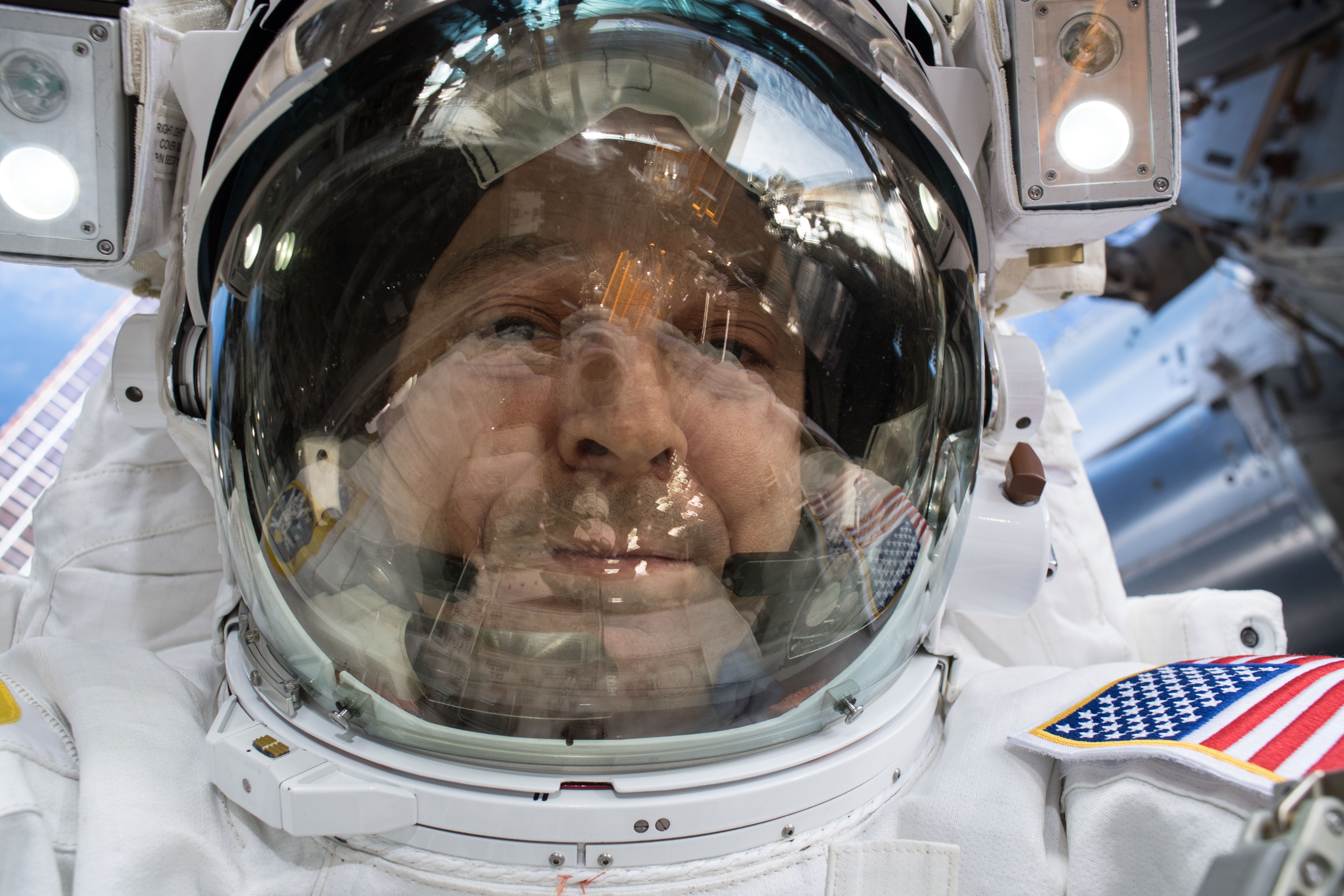
A selfie taken by Arnold during an EVA in 2018

In March 2017, Arnold was assigned to ISS Expeditions 55/56. He launched on Soyuz MS-08 on March 21, 2018.

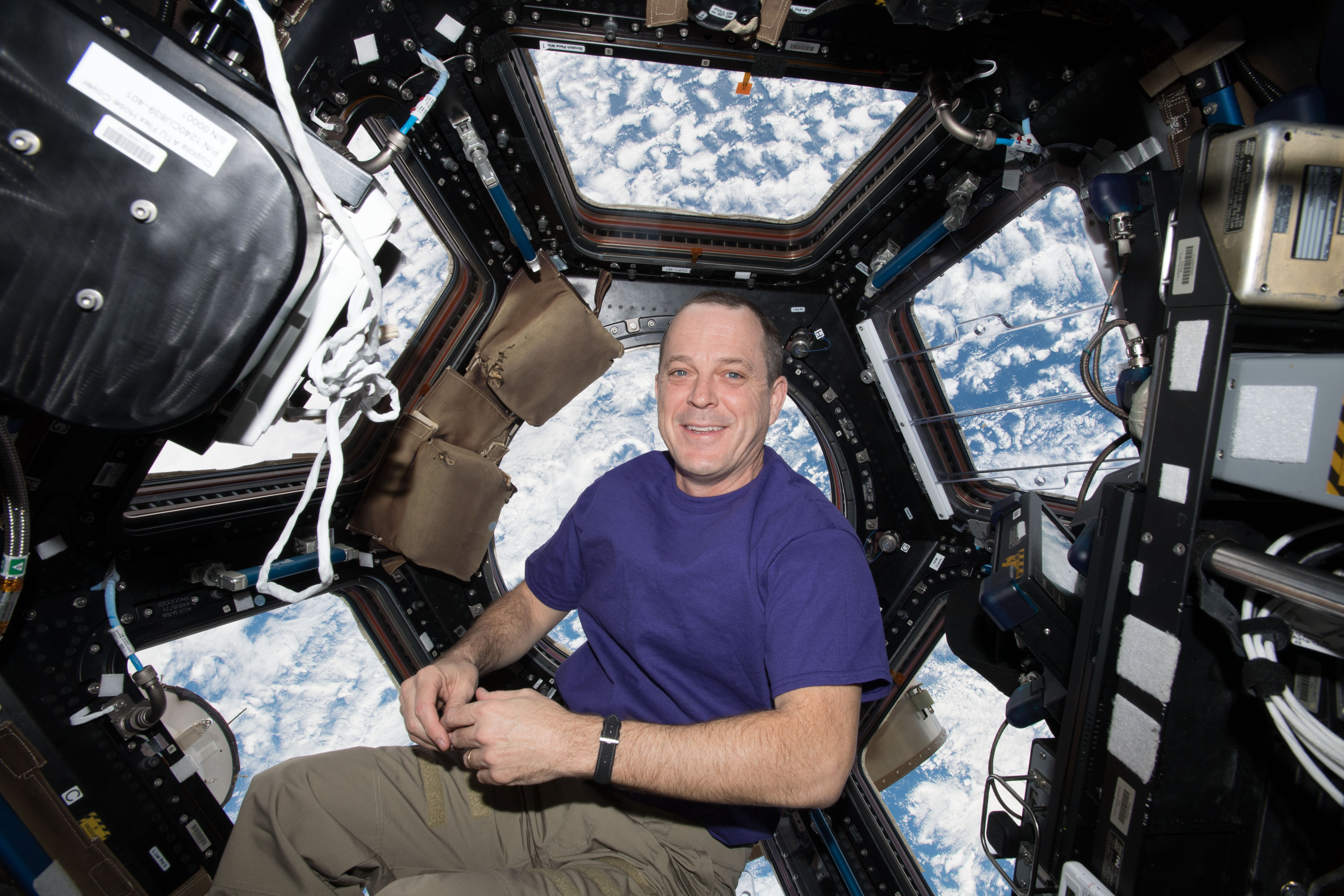
Arnold pictured in the Cupola during Expedition 55

On March 29, 2018, Arnold performed his first EVA of the mission, with crewmate Drew Feustel. They installed wireless communications equipment on the station's Tranquility module to enhance payload data processing for the experiment ECOSTRESS (Ecosystem Spaceborne Thermal Radiometer Experiment on Space Station). They also swapped out high-definition video cameras on the port truss of the station's backbone and removed aging hoses from a cooling component on the station's truss. The spacewalk had a duration of 6 hours and 10 minutes, bringing Arnold's cumulative EVA time to over 18 hours.

Arnold returned to Earth on October 4, 2018.
