= Soyuz MS-08 =

2018 Russian crewed spaceflight to the ISS

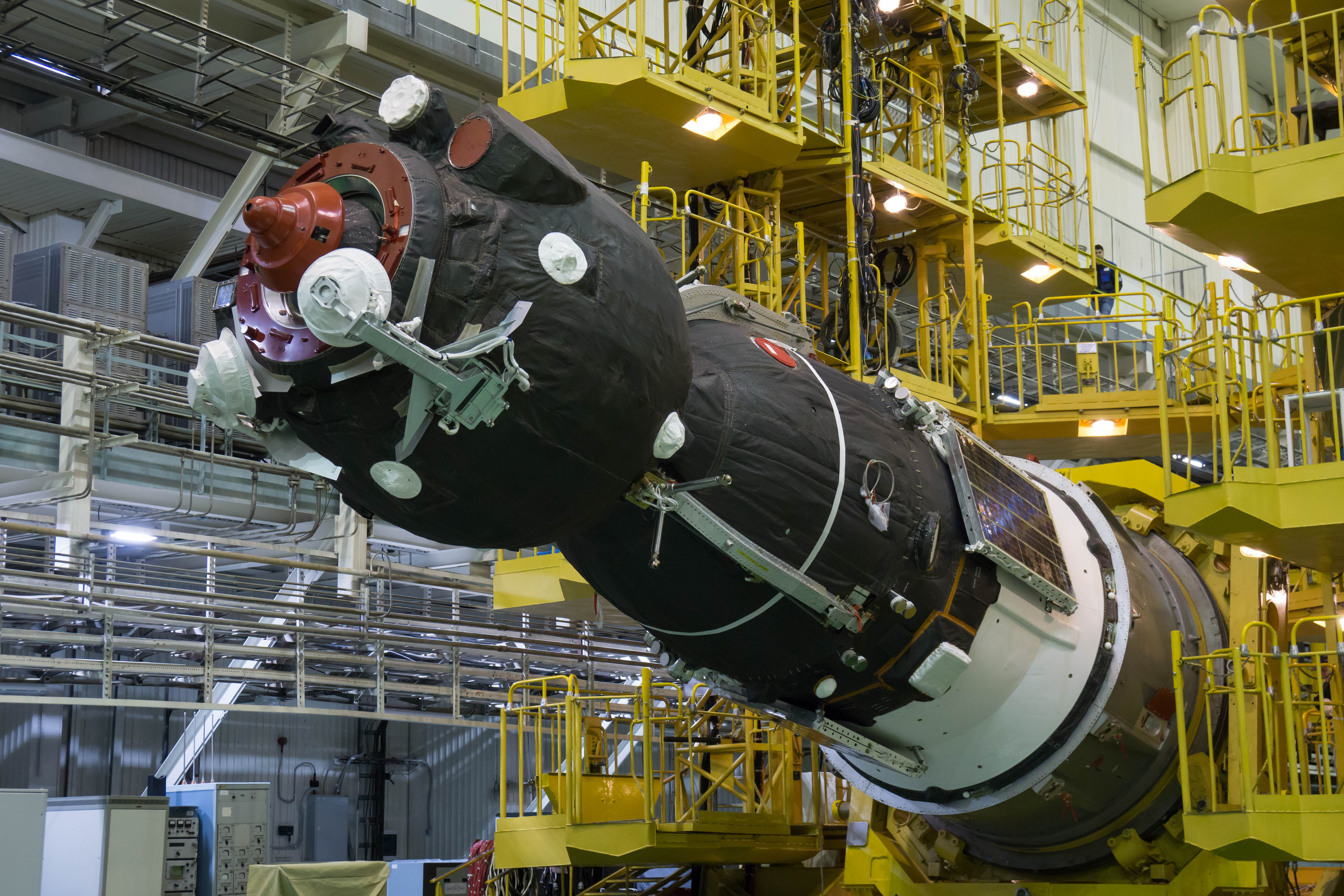
- Soyuz MS-08 spacecraft
- Operator: Roscosmos
- COSPAR ID: 2018-026A
- SATCAT no.: 43238
- Mission duration: 196d 18h 1m

Spacecraft properties
- Spacecraft type: Soyuz-MS 11F747
- Manufacturer: Energia
- Launch mass: 7,220

Crew
- Crew size: 3
- Members: Oleg Artemyev; Andrew J. Feustel; Richard R. Arnold
- Callsign: Hawaii

Start of mission
- Launch date: 21 March 2018, 17:44 UTC
- Rocket: Soyuz-FG
- Launch site: Baikonur Pad 1/5
- Contractor: RKTs Progress

End of mission
- Landing date: 4 October 2018, 11:45 UTC
- Landing site: Kazakhstan

Orbital parameters
- Reference system: Geocentric
- Regime: Low Earth

Docking with ISS
- Docking port: Poisk zenith
- Docking date: 23 March 2018, 20:40 UTC
- Undocking date: 4 October 2018, 07:57 UTC
- Time docked: 194d 11h 17m
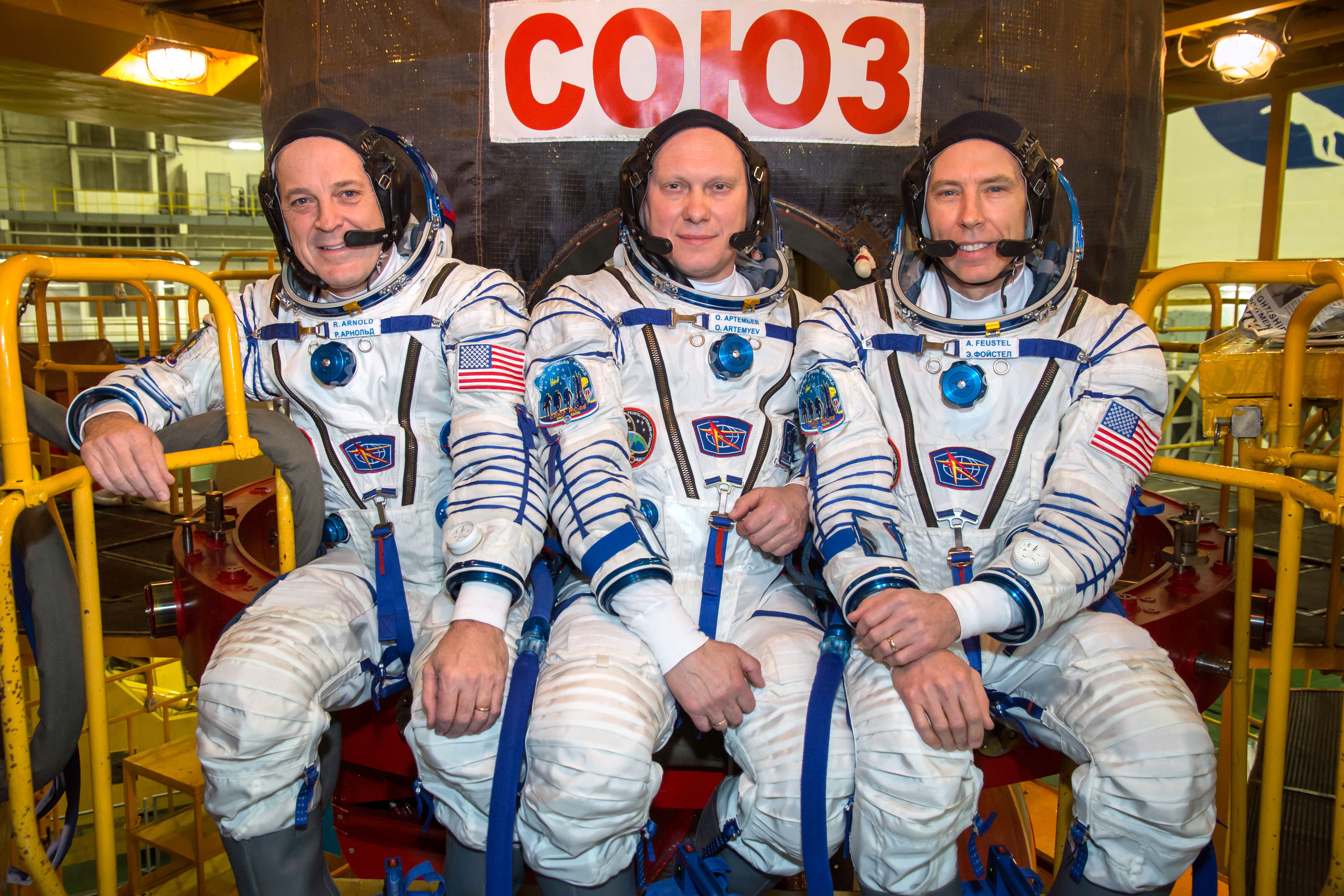
- Mission insignia (l-r) Arnold, Artemyev and Feustel Soyuz programme (crewed)

Soyuz MS-08 was a Soyuz spaceflight that launched on 21 March 2018. It transported three members of the Expedition 55 crew to the International Space Station. MS-08 was the 137th flight of a Soyuz spacecraft. The crew consisted of a Russian commander, and two American flight engineers.

MS-08 returned its crew to Earth on 4 October 2018.

== Crew ==
Prime crew
Position	Crew
Commander	(Russia) Oleg Artemyev, Roscosmos; Expedition 55; Second spaceflight
Flight engineer	(United States) Andrew J. Feustel, NASA; Expedition 55; Third and last spaceflight
Flight engineer	(United States) Richard R. Arnold, NASA; Expedition 55; Second and last spaceflight

Backup crew
Position	Crew
Commander	(Russia) Aleksey Ovchinin, Roscosmos
Flight engineer	(United States) Nick Hague, NASA
