= Expedition 55 =

55th expedition to the International Space Station

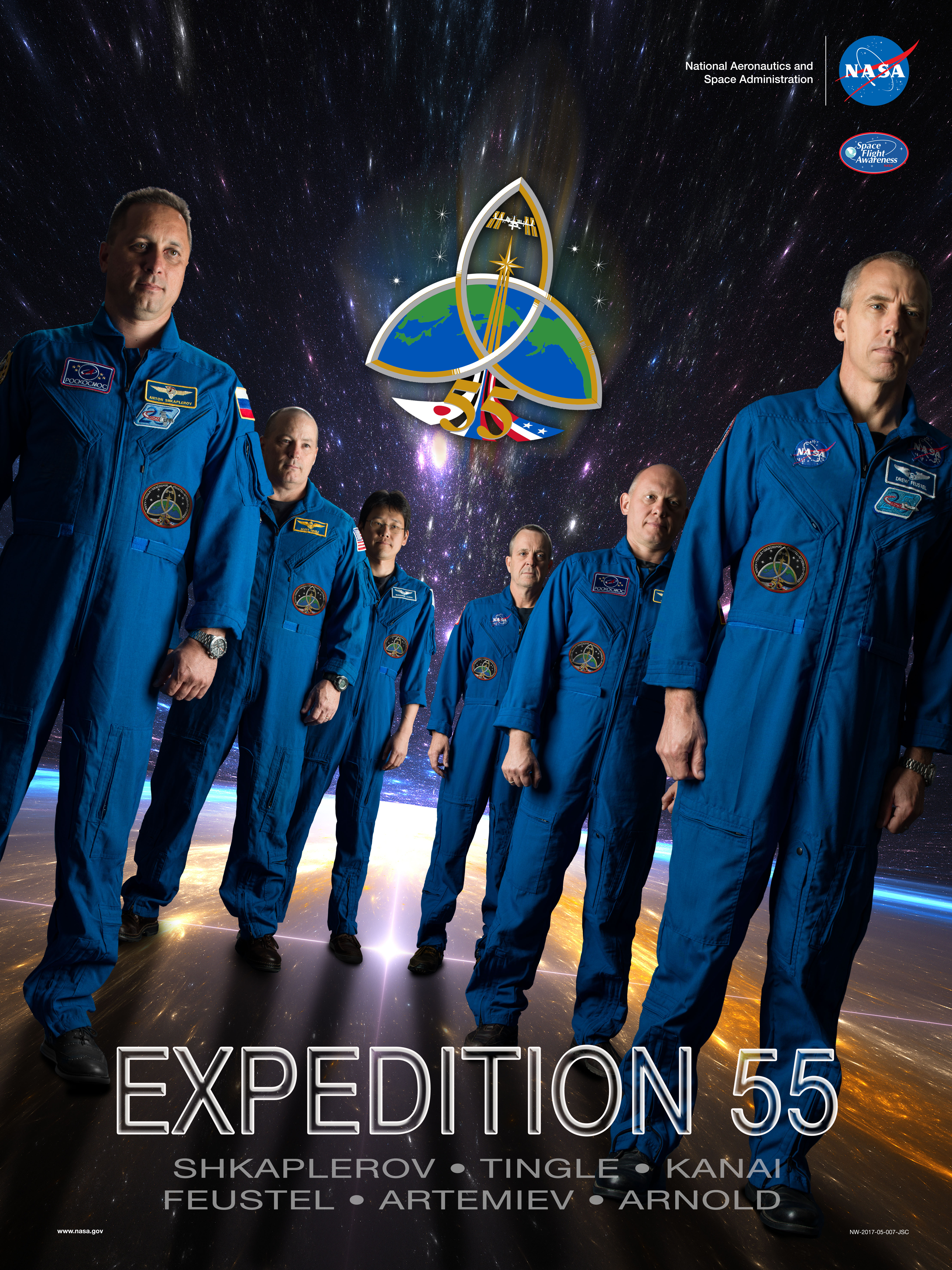
- Promotional Poster
- Mission type: Long-duration expedition
- Mission duration: 95d 10h 8m

Expedition
- Space station: International Space Station
- Began: 27 February 2018 UTC
- Ended: 3 June 2018 UTC
- Arrived aboard: Soyuz MS-07; Soyuz MS-08
- Departed aboard: Soyuz MS-07; Soyuz MS-08

Crew
- Crew size: 6
- Members: Expedition 54/55: Anton Shkaplerov; Scott D. Tingle; Norishige Kanai; Expedition 55/56: Andrew Feustel; Oleg Artemyev; Richard R. Arnold
- EVAs: 2
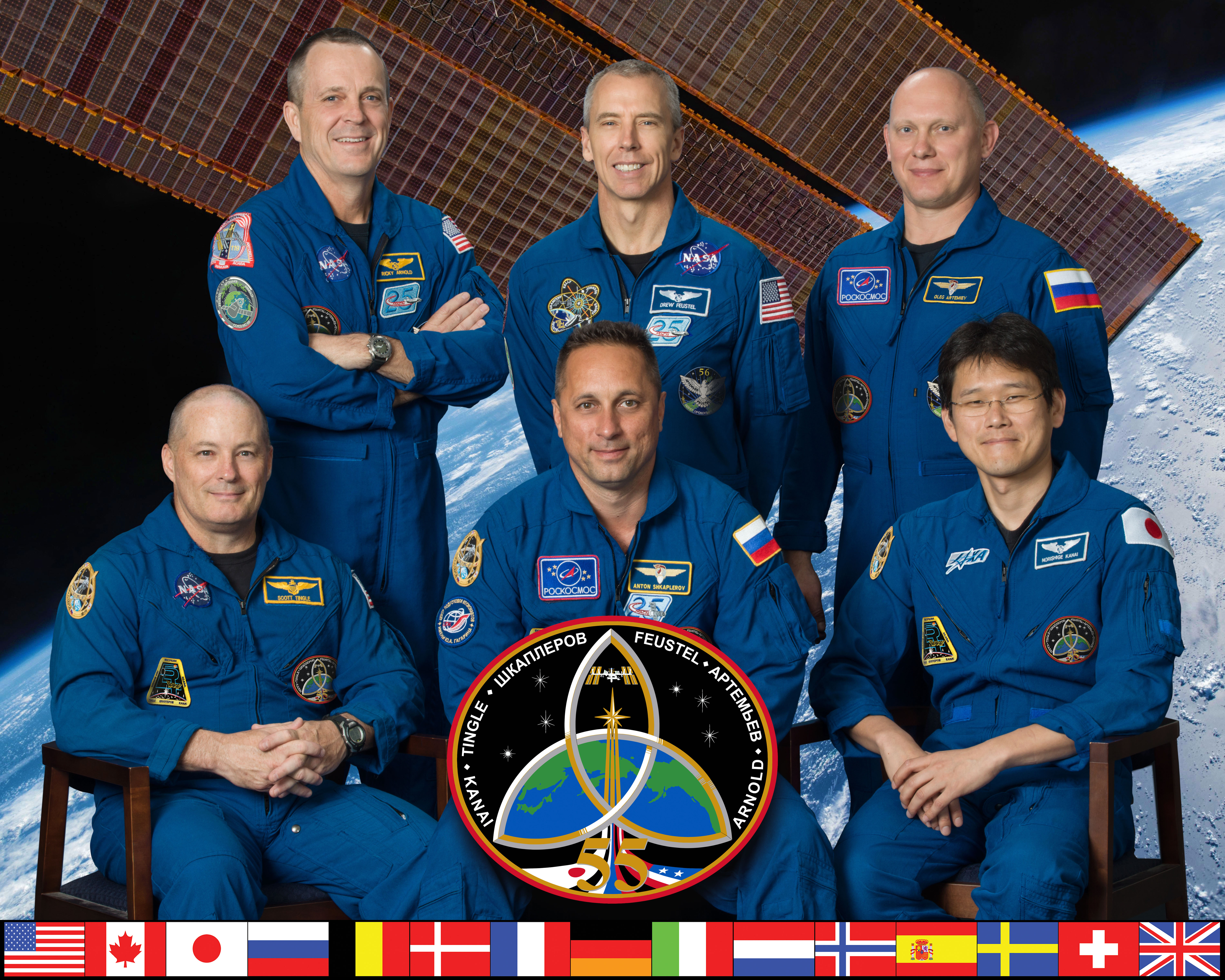
- Expedition 55 mission patch (l-r) Tingle, Arnold, Shkaplerov, Feustel, Artemyev and Kanai ISS expeditions

Expedition 55 was the 55th expedition to the International Space Station, which began upon the departure of Soyuz MS-06 on 27 February 2018. Anton Shkaplerov, Scott D. Tingle and Norishige Kanai were transferred from Expedition 54, with Anton Shkaplerov taking the commander role. Expedition 55 ended upon the departure of Soyuz MS-07 in June 2018.

== Crew ==
Position	First part (27 February – 23 March 2018)	Second part (23 March – 3 June 2018)
Commander	Anton Shkaplerov, RSA; Third spaceflight	
Flight engineer	Scott D. Tingle, NASA; First spaceflight	
Flight engineer	Norishige Kanai, JAXA; First spaceflight	
Flight engineer	Off station	Andrew Feustel, NASA; Third and last spaceflight
Flight engineer	Off station	Oleg Artemyev, RSA; Second spaceflight
Flight engineer	Off station	Richard R. Arnold, NASA; Second and last spaceflight

== Spacewalks ==
EVA #	Spacewalkers	Start (UTC)	End (UTC)	Duration
1	Andrew J. Feustel; Richard R. Arnold	29 March 2018; 13:33	29 March 2018; 19:43	6 hours, 10 minutes
1	Installed two WiFi antennas on the Node 3 module in preparation for the arrival of ECOSTRESS on SpaceX CRS-15, removed ammonia jumpers and inspected two working jumpers on the stations truss, replaced camera and lights used to film NASA TV.			
2	Andrew J. Feustel; Richard R. Arnold	16 May 2018; 11:39	16 May 2018; 18:10	6 hours, 31 minutes
2	Transferred a Pump Flow Control Subassembly over to Dextre stowed failed PFCS on ESP-1, Replaced camera and lights used to film NASA TV, Replaced Space to Ground Transceiver Controller, Performed get aheads to Install handrails on Radiator Grapple Bars on S1, Removed thermal blankets and MLI from two Direct Current Switching Units on ESP-2, Prepped the Flex Hose Rotary Coupler on S1 for replacement. Spacewalk suffered a 7-minute delay because of a water leak which formed ice crystals inside the airlock.			

== Uncrewed spaceflights to the ISS ==
Resupply missions that visited the International Space Station during Expedition 55:

Flight	Country	Mission	Launcher	Launch (UTC)	Docked/Berthed (UTC)	Undocked/Unberthed (UTC)	Duration (Docked)	Deorbit
CRS SpX-14	United States	Logistics	Falcon 9	2 April 2018, 20:30:38	4 April 2018, 13:00	5 May 2018 13:23	31d 23m	5 May 2018
CRS OA-9E	United States	Logistics	Antares 230	21 May 2018, 08:44:06	24 May 2018, 12:13	15 July 2018, 10:20	51d 22h 7m	30 July 2018
