= Expedition 58 =

58th expedition to the International Space Station

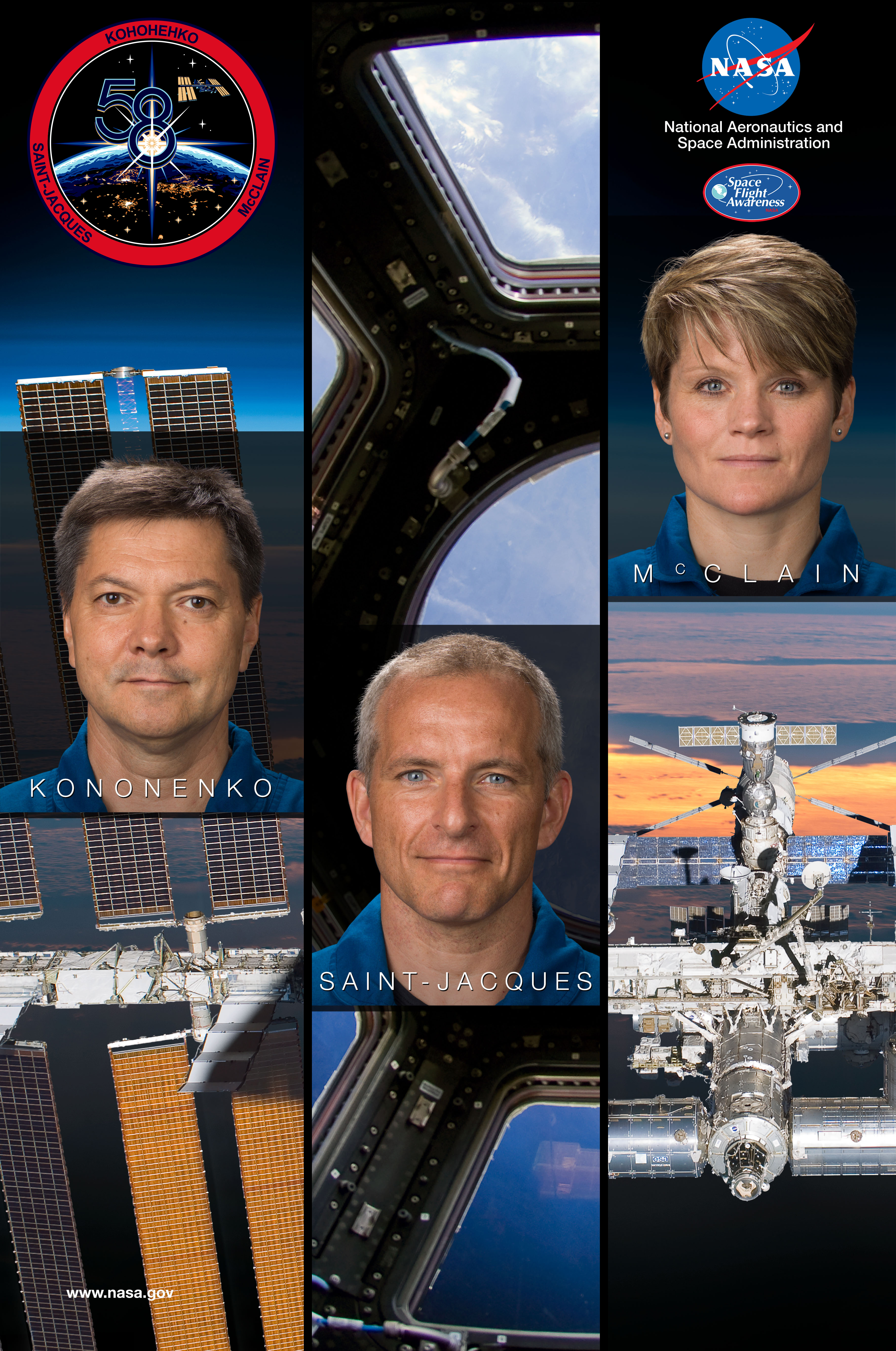
- ISS Expedition 58
- Mission type: Long-duration expedition
- Mission duration: 84 days, 23 hours, 21 minutes

Expedition
- Space station: International Space Station
- Began: 20 December 2018, 01:40 UTC
- Ended: 15 March 2019, 01:01 UTC
- Arrived aboard: Soyuz MS-11
- Departed aboard: Soyuz MS-11

Crew
- Crew size: 3
- Members: Expedition 57/58/59: Oleg Kononenko; Anne McClain; David Saint-Jacques
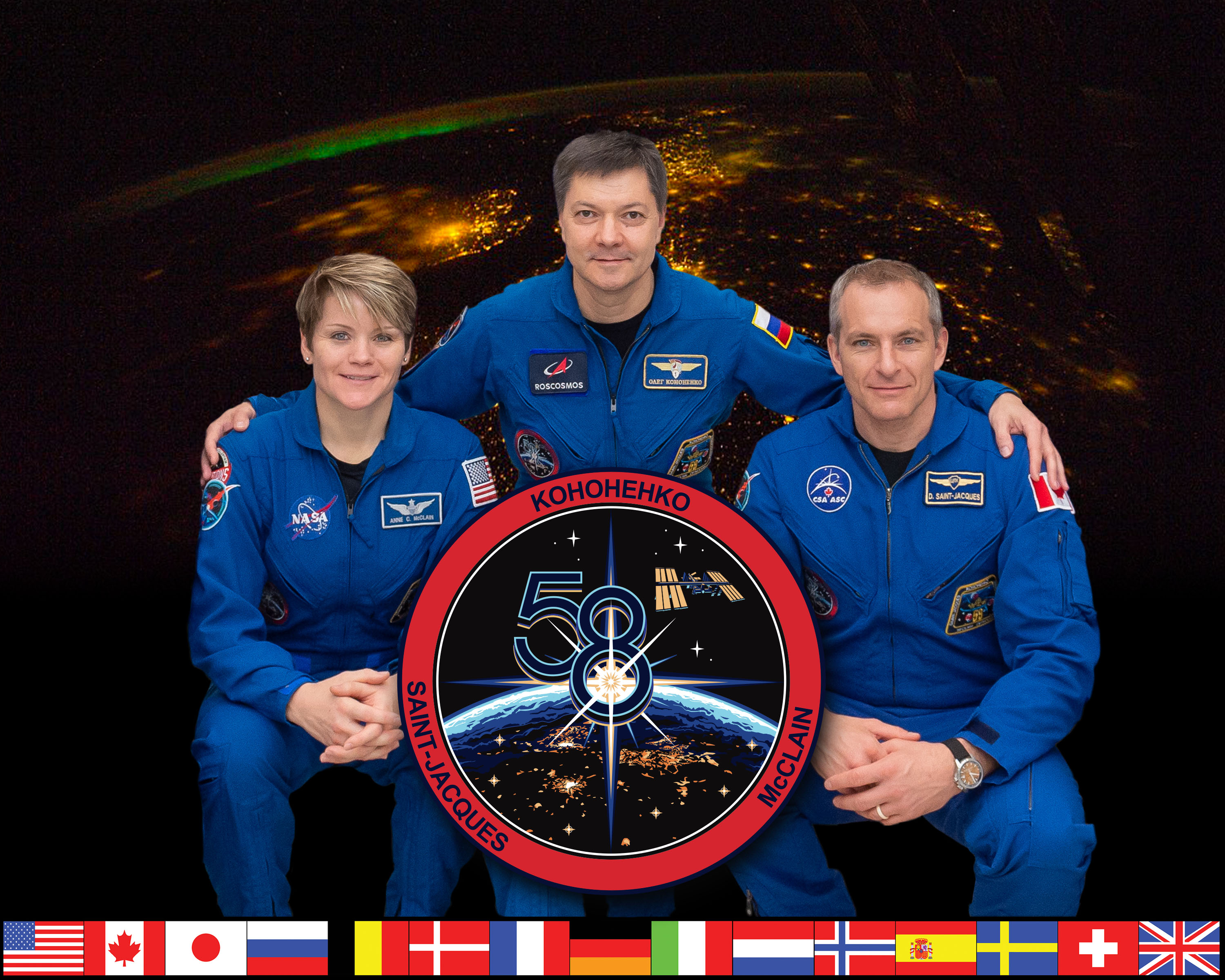
- Expedition 58 mission patch From left: McClain, Kononenko and Saint-Jacques ISS expeditions

Expedition 57/58: Change of Command Ceremony

Expedition 58 was the 58th expedition to the International Space Station, which began on December 20, 2018, with the departure of the Expedition 57 crew. It was commanded by cosmonaut Oleg Kononenko with astronauts Anne McClain and David Saint-Jacques as flight engineers; the trio launched on board Soyuz MS-11 on December 3, 2018, marking the 100th orbital launch of the year.

Kononenko, McClain, and Saint-Jacques subsequently transferred to Expedition 59 on March 15, 2019 when Aleksey Ovchinin, Nick Hague, and Christina Koch arrived on board Soyuz MS-12.

== History ==
During early planning, the expedition was scheduled to include rookie cosmonaut Nikolai Tikhonov. However, Tikhonov's assignment was postponed (for the second time) due to delays in launching the Russian Nauka module. Tikhonov has been reassigned to the Soyuz MS-14 flight scheduled for late 2019.

As of October 2018, plans called for the expedition to feature a crew of five: cosmonaut Aleksey Ovchinin and astronaut Nick Hague would have joined the Expedition 57 crew in October 2018, and subsequently transferred to Expedition 58; they would have been joined by Kononenko, McClain and Saint-Jacques in December 2018. Ovchinin and Hague would then have returned to Earth in April 2019. Subsequently, the Expedition 59 mission would have begun with Kononenko as commander. However, the Soyuz MS-10 spacecraft carrying Ocvhinin and Hague aborted during its launch on October 11, 2018; the two crew returned safely to Earth.

Following the Soyuz MS-10 abort, NASA administrator Jim Bridenstine announced on October 23, 2018, that Soyuz flights to the ISS were expected to resume in December 2018. At first, it was assumed that Expedition 58 would initially consist of three crew members who would then be joined later by the crew of Soyuz MS-12, bringing the crew up to six. However, in the post-launch news conference for Soyuz MS-11, NASA announced that the Soyuz MS-12 crew would become the station Expedition 59/60 crew. Expedition 58 was therefore a three person increment.

== Crew ==
Position	Crew member
Commander	Oleg Kononenko, RSA; Fourth spaceflight
Flight engineer	Anne McClain, NASA; First spaceflight
Flight engineer	David Saint-Jacques, CSA; First spaceflight

Saint-Jacques is the first Canadian resident on the space station since Chris Hadfield served as commander of Expedition 35, which concluded on May 13, 2013, almost six years prior.

== Uncrewed spaceflights to the ISS ==
Resupply missions that visited the International Space Station during Expedition 58:

Spacecraft: ISS flight number	Country	Mission	Launcher	Launch (UTC)	Docked/Berthed (UTC) ^{†}	Undocked/Unberthed (UTC)	Duration (Docked)	Deorbit
SpX-DM1	United States	Test flight	Falcon 9 Block 5	2 Mar 2019, 07:49:03	3 Mar 2019, 10:51	8 Mar 2019, 7:32	4d 20h 41m	8 Mar 2019, 13:45
