= Expedition 59 =

Long-duration mission to the International Space Station

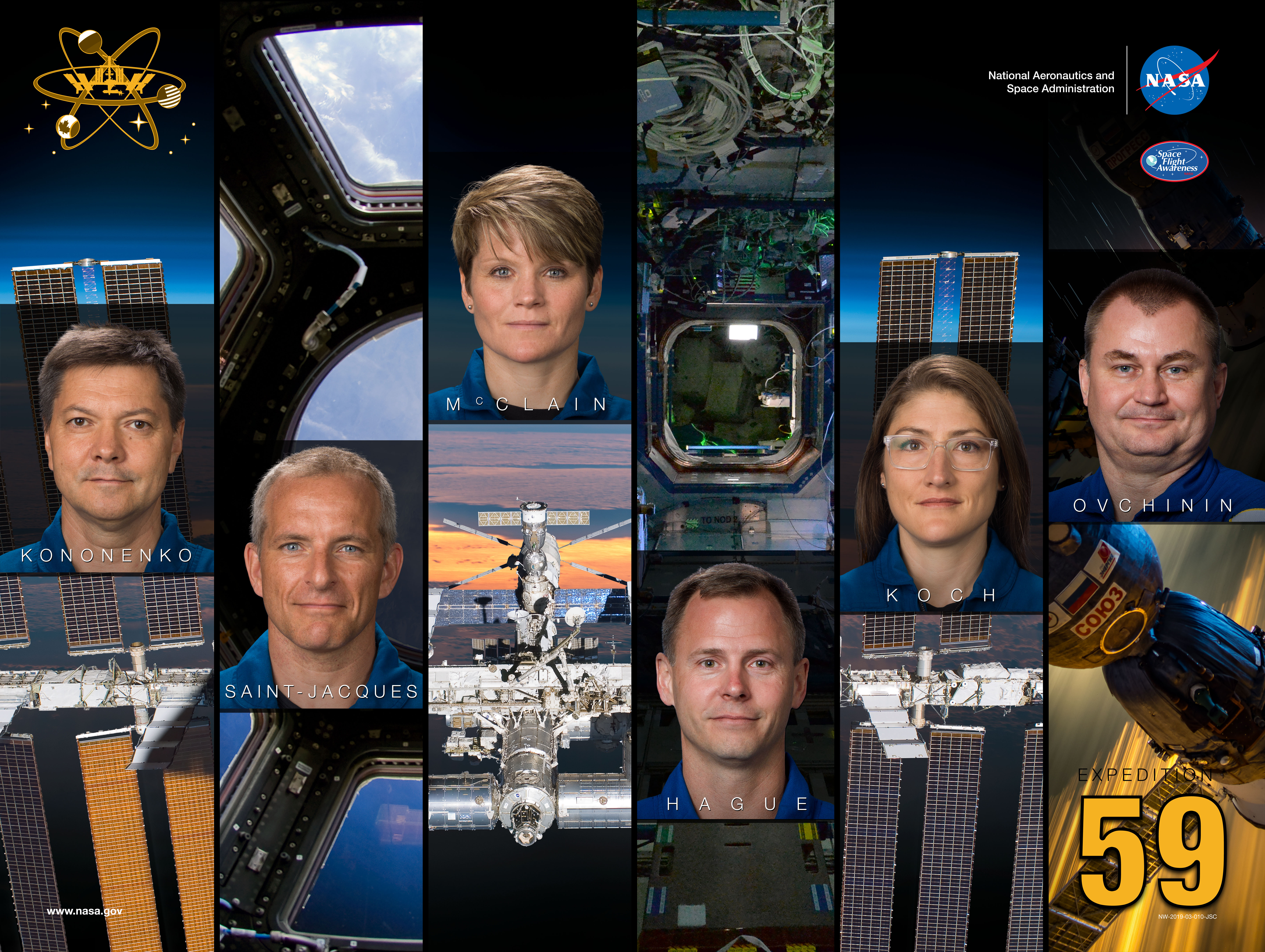
- Promotional Poster
- Mission type: Long-duration expedition
- Mission duration: 101 days, 22 hours, 24 minutes

Expedition
- Space station: International Space Station
- Began: 15 March 2019, 01:01 UTC
- Ended: 24 June 2019, 23:25 UTC
- Arrived aboard: Soyuz MS-11; Soyuz MS-12
- Departed aboard: Soyuz MS-11

Crew
- Crew size: 6
- Members: Expedition 57/58/59: Oleg Kononenko; Anne McClain; David Saint-Jacques; Expedition 59/60: Aleksey Ovchinin; Nick Hague; Expedition 59/60/61: Christina Koch
- EVAs: 4
- EVA duration: 25 hours, 55 minutes
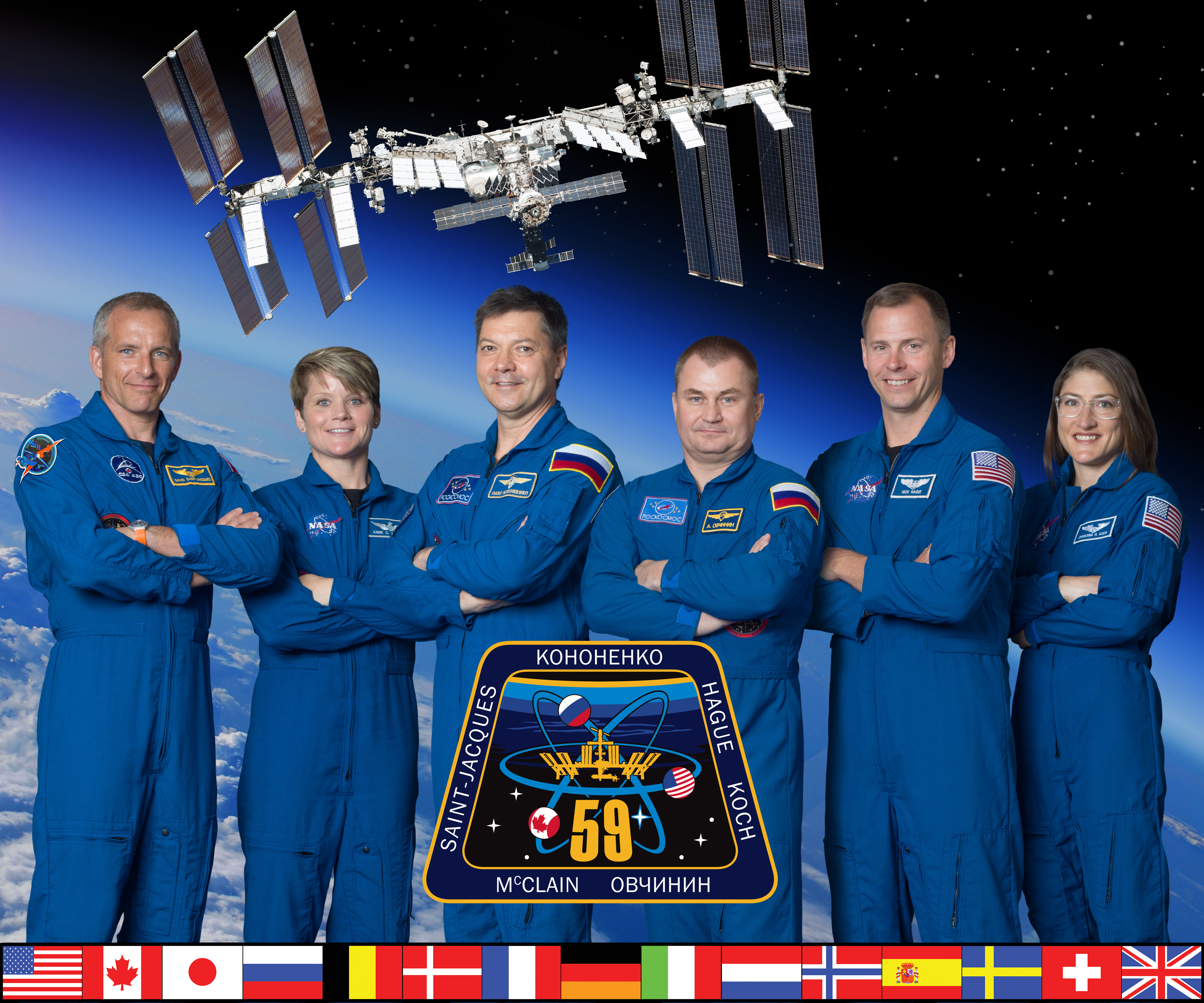
- Expedition 59 mission patch From left: Saint-Jacques, McClain, Kononenko, Ovchinin, Hague and Koch ISS expeditions

Expedition 59 was the 59th Expedition to the International Space Station. It started with the arrival of the Soyuz MS-12 spacecraft carrying Aleksey Ovchinin, Nick Hague and Christina Koch, joining Oleg Kononenko, David Saint-Jacques, and Anne McClain, who transferred from Expedition 58. The expedition formally began on March 15, 2019 (March 14 in the Americas). Ovchinin and Hague were originally meant to fly to the ISS aboard Soyuz MS-10, but returned to Earth minutes after takeoff due to a contingency abort. The expedition formally ended with the undocking of the Soyuz MS-11 spacecraft carrying Kononenko, Saint-Jacques and McClain on 24 June 2019; Ovchinin, Hague and Koch transferred to Expedition 60.

== Crew ==
Position	Crew member
Commander	Oleg Kononenko, Roscosmos; Fourth spaceflight
Flight engineer	David Saint-Jacques, CSA; First spaceflight
Flight engineer	Anne McClain, NASA; First spaceflight
Flight engineer	Aleksey Ovchinin, Roscosmos; Second (Note: Not counting the aborted flight of Soyuz MS-10.) spaceflight
Flight engineer	Nick Hague, NASA; First spaceflight
Flight engineer	Christina Koch, NASA; First spaceflight

== Spacewalks ==
EVA #	Spacewalkers	Start (UTC)	End (UTC)	Duration
1	Anne McClain; Nick Hague	22 March 2019, 12:01	22 March 2019, 18:40	6 hours, 39 minutes
1	McClain and Hague installed adapter plates while Dextre swaps the batteries between spacewalks. Get aheads included removing debris from the Unity Module in preparation for the arrival of Cygnus NG-11 in April, stowing tools for the repair of the flex hose rotary coupler, and securing tiebacks on the solar array blanket boxes. This spacewalk was originally going to be carried out by European astronaut Alexander Gerst and Hague as part of Expedition 57, although it was delayed due to the Soyuz MS-10 launch abort.			
2	Nick Hague; Christina Koch	29 March 2019, 11:42	29 March 2019, 18:27	6 hours, 45 minutes
2	Hague and Koch finished the work of the first spacewalk and installed the final three adapter plates on the other side of the P4 Truss. The crew also transferred some tools and installed a grapple bar on the flex hose rotary coupler. Between spacewalks, Dextre will change the batteries and the exposed pallet will be loaded onto HTV-8 to be jettisoned into space where it will burn up. One of the batteries malfunctioned and will be removed by Dextre and discarded. Dextre will also replace a Battery Discharge Unit and will bring the failed unit which was damaged by the short inside where it will be returned to earth on SpaceX CRS-17. Until it is repaired P4 will use the old batteries left on the station as spares. Get aheads included installing gap spanners and breaking torque on the P6 batteries in preparation for their replacement by Expedition 62 crew members this summer. Hague also inspected sockets on P6 so the foot restraints could be attached. This spacewalk was supposed to be done by Anne McClain and Christina Koch as an all female spacewalk but because of problems with Christina's suit and the spare suit not ready or properly sized Anne McClain will have to sit this spacewalk out and will have to go out with David on the next spacewalk. This spacewalk became the first for Koch who became the 14th woman to walk in space.			
3	Anne McClain (Canada) David Saint-Jacques	8 April 2019, 11:31	8 April 2019, 18:00	6 hours, 30 minutes
3	McClain and Saint Jacques routed cables to be used as a redundant power supply for Canadarm2. The crew installed studs on the Columbus Module in preparation for the installation of an exposed facility. The crew removed an adapter plate and reinstalled an old set of batteries as spares to replace a failed battery that malfunctioned on the last spacewalk. Saint Jacques became the first Canadian crew member to walk in space and the fourth Canadian to do a spacewalk since Chris Hadfield			
4	Oleg Kononenko; Aleksey Ovchinin	29 May 2019, 15:42	29 May 2019, 21:43	6 hours, 1 minute
4	Kononenko and Ovichinin removed experiments from the Pirs docking compartment and cleaned the windows. They also installed a handrail to connect Zarya to Poisk and re-positioned the Plume Measuring Unit. The crew then moved to the Zvesda Service Module and removed and jettisoned the Plasma Monitoring Units. Before they closed the hatch they sent a video of themselves and sang happy birthday in Russian to Alexei Leonov who was the first spacewalker and was celebrating his 85th birthday.			

== Uncrewed spaceflights to the ISS ==
Resupply missions that visited the International Space Station during Expedition 59:

Spacecraft: ISS flight number	Country	Mission	Launcher	Launch (UTC)	Docked/Berthed (UTC) ^{†}	Undocked/Unberthed (UTC)	Duration (Docked)	Deorbit
Progress MS-11: ISS 72P	Russia	Logistics	Soyuz-2.1a	4 Apr 2019, 11:01:35	4 Apr 2019, 14:22	29 Jul 2019, 10:44	115d 20h 22m	29 Jul 2019, 13:50
Cygnus NG-11: CRS NG-11	United States	Logistics	Antares 230	17 Apr 2019, 20:46:07	19 Apr 2019, 09:28	6 Aug 2019, 16:15	109d 6h 47m	6 Dec 2019, 15:28
SpaceX CRS-17: SpX-17	United States	Logistics	Falcon 9	4 May 2019, 06:48	6 May 2019, 13:33	3 Jun 2019, 16:01	28d 2h 28m	3 Jun 2019, 20:56

== Mission summary ==
Researchers on Expedition 59 will conduct experimentation on tissue chips since the microgravity environment can replicate the effects of aging and disease. The expedition will also conduct experiments on regolith simulants, Earth's atmospheric carbon cycle, and Astrobee robots designed to conduct routine chores aboard the ISS.
