= Aleksey Ovchinin =

Russian Air Force Major and cosmonaut (born 1971)

- Алексей Овчинин
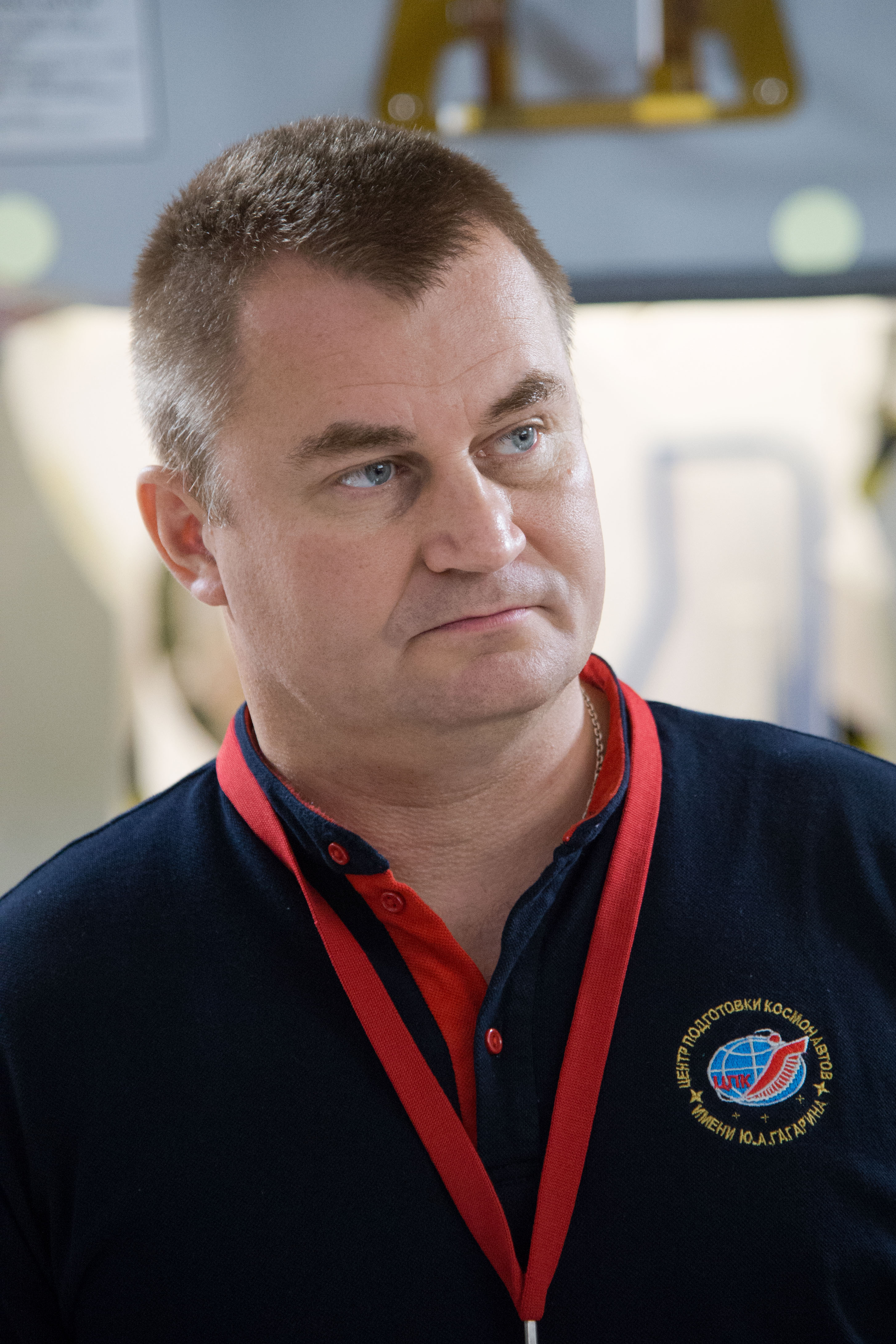
- Ovchinin in 2014
- Born: Aleksey Nikolayevich Ovchinin; 28 September 1971 (age 55); Rybinsk, Yaroslavl Oblast, Russian SFSR, USSR
- Education: Russian Presidential Academy of National Economy and Public Administration
- Awards: Hero of the Russian Federation; Pilot-Cosmonaut of the Russian Federation
- Space career

Roscosmos cosmonaut
- Current occupation: Test cosmonaut
- Status: Active
- Rank: Podpolkovnik, Russian Air Force (reserve)
- Time in space: 595 days, 4 hours, 27 minutes
- Selection: TsPK-14 Cosmonaut Group (2006)
- Total EVAs: 2
- Total EVA time: 13 hours, 18 minutes
- Missions: Soyuz TMA-20M (Expedition 47/48); Soyuz MS-10 (aborted); Soyuz MS-12 (Expedition 59/60); Soyuz MS-26 (Expedition 71/72)
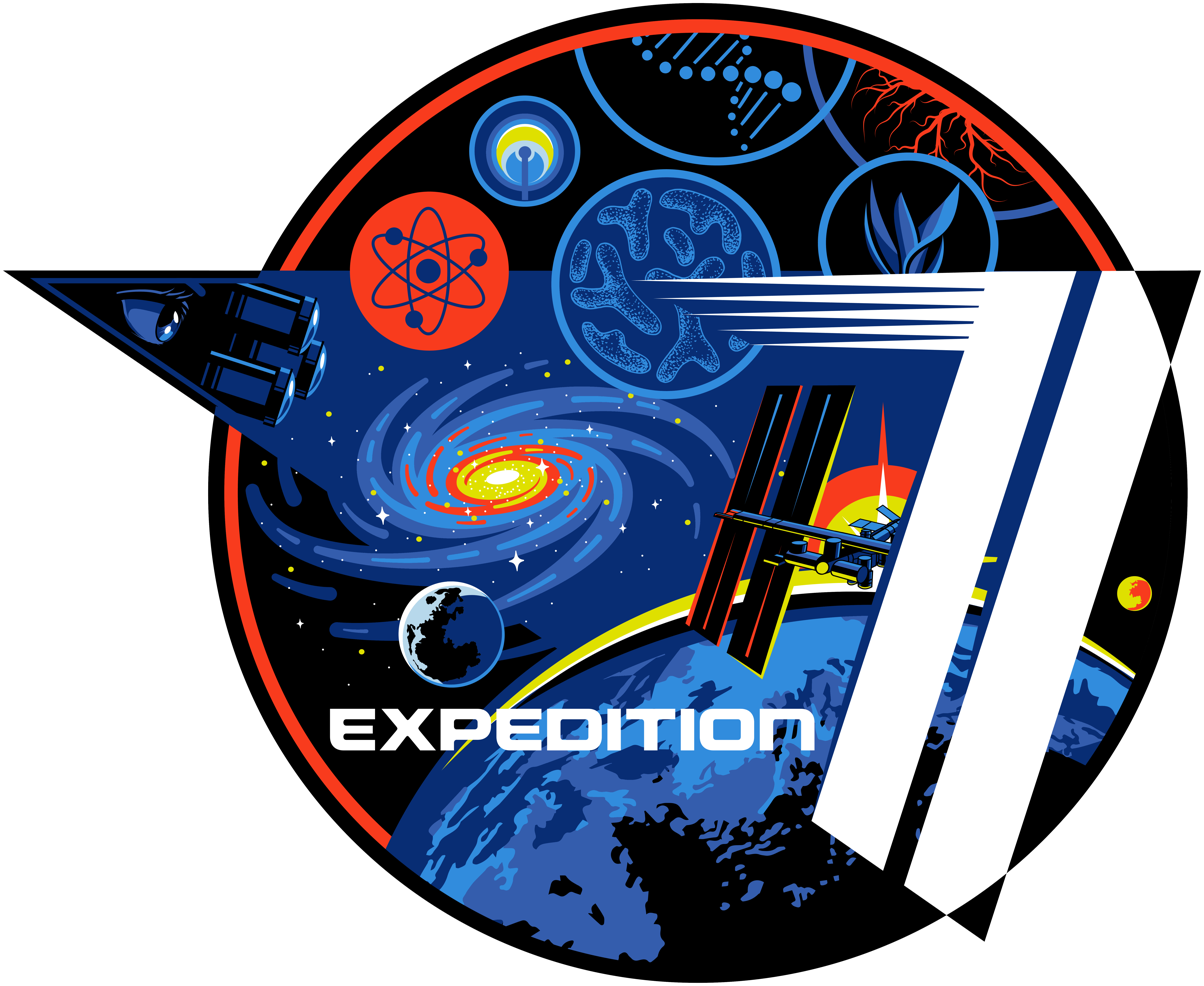
- Mission insignia

Aleksey Nikolayevich Ovchinin (Russian: Алексей Николаевич Овчинин; born 28 September 1971) is a Russian cosmonaut and holds the rank of Podpolkovnik (lieutenant colonel) in the Russian Air Force Reserve. He was selected as a cosmonaut in 2006 and made his first spaceflight in 2016 on Soyuz TMA-20M, where he also served as commander.

== Early life ==
He graduated from high school No. 2 in the city of Rybinsk.

From August 1988 to September 1990 he was a cadet of Borisoglebsk Higher Military Pilot School and, from September 1990 to August 1992, a student of the Yeisk Higher Military Pilot School where he qualified as a pilot-engineer.

From August 1992 to February 1998 he served as a pilot instructor in the Training Aviation Regiment (TAR) at Yeisk Higher Military Pilot School. From February 1998 to September 2003 he was a pilot instructor, then commander of the aviation section of Krasnodar Military Aviation Institute (MAI) in Kotelnikovo (Volgograd region). From September 2003, until his enrollment as a cosmonaut, he served as a commander of an aviation unit of the 70th Separate Test Training Aviation Regiment of Special Purpose (OITAPON). He has over 1300 hours flying time in Yak-52 and L-39 aircraft. Ovchinin is qualified as a Pilot Instructor Second Class.

By order of the Minister of Defense of the Russian Federation in 2012 he was dismissed from the Armed Forces into reserve.

== Cosmonaut career ==
On 11 October 2006, at the meeting of the Interdepartmental Commission for the selection of cosmonauts, he was recommended as a cosmonaut candidate at the Yuri Gagarin Cosmonaut Training Center.

From 16 to 22 June 2008 in Sevastopol he participated in descent vehicle training along with Robert Thirsk (Canada) and Richard Garriott (USA). The training was specifically for landing on water.

On 9 June 2009 he qualified as a "test cosmonaut" and was presented with Cosmonaut Certificate No. 205. On 1 August 2009 he was appointed as a test cosmonaut of the Yuri Gagarin Cosmonaut Training Center. In October 2009, at the Baikonur Cosmodrome, he participated in training in the Mini Research Module (MRM). On 26 April 2010 he was certified as a cosmonaut of the Yuri Gagarin Cosmonaut Training Center NII FGBU detachment. In September 2013, he took part in the CAVES (Cooperative Adventure from Valuing and Exercising human behaviour and performance Skills) mission in the Sa Grutta caves on the island of Sardinia (Italy). During the mission, five astronauts and cosmonauts (Michael Barratt, Jack Fisher, Jeremy Hansen, Paolo Nespoli and Satoshi Furukawa) from different space agencies worked in a multicultural and multi-ethnic team in extreme conditions underground.

He trained as a part of the backup crew for Soyuz TMA-16M, the launch of which took place on 27 March 2015. In the autumn of 2015, Ovchinin and cosmonaut Oleg Skripochka tasted 160 culinary dishes, designed for astronauts on board the ISS, over an 8-day period. Food was evaluated on a 9-point scale.

=== Expedition 47/48 ===
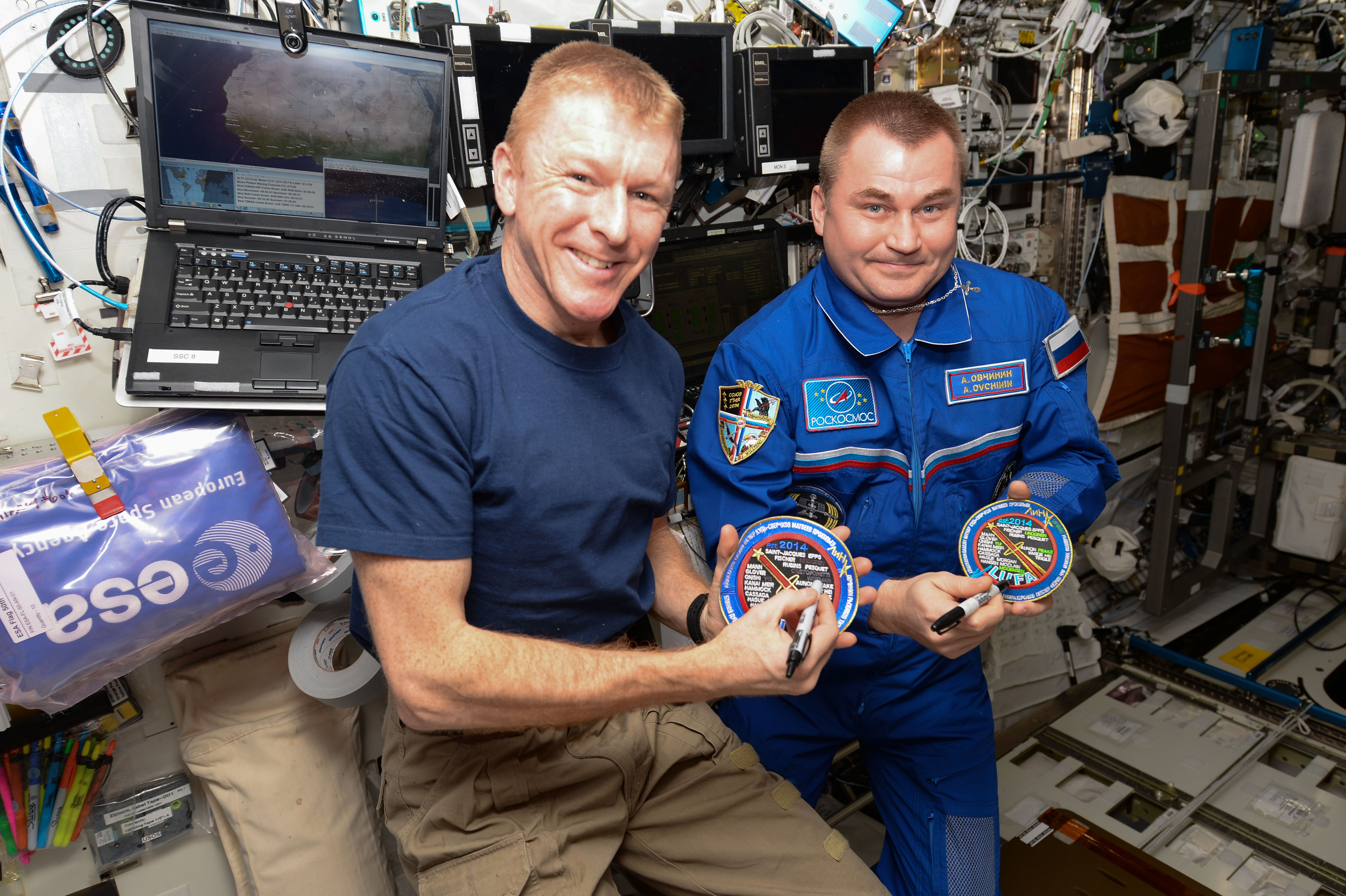
Ovchinin with Expedition 47 crewmate Tim Peake

Ovchinin launched to space on his first flight as the commander of Soyuz TMA-20M, which launched on 18 March 2016 21:26 UTC, to join the International Space Station as part of Expedition 47/48. He returned to Earth with his crew mates on 7 September 2016 after 172 days on orbit.

=== Expedition 57 (aborted) ===
On 11 October 2018 Ovchinin and Nick Hague boarded Soyuz MS-10 on the way to the International Space Station to join Expedition 57, but the launch was aborted mid-flight due to a booster failure; the crew landed safely after a ballistic descent. During his MS-10 flight, the Soyuz spacecraft aborted at an altitude of around 50 kilometers (31 miles) and reached an apogee of 93 km (58 mi), just short of the Kármán line, before landing 19 minutes and 41 seconds after launch.

=== Expedition 59/60 ===
Ovchinin launched to the ISS again on 14 March 2019, travelling on Soyuz MS-12 with American astronauts Nick Hague and Christina Koch. The trio joined the Expedition 59 crew, along with commander Oleg Kononenko and flight engineers David Saint-Jacques and Anne McClain. After the departure of Kononenko, Saint-Jacques, and McClain on 24 June 2019, Ovchinin took command of the station for Expedition 60.

=== Expedition 71/72 ===
In September 2024, he flew on Soyuz MS-26 with Ivan Vagner and Donald Pettit. His return occurred in April 2025.

== Family life ==
He has a wife, Svetlana, and a daughter. His hobbies include hunting, fishing and music.

== See also ==
- List of Heroes of the Russian Federation

Preceded by Oleg Kononenko	ISS Commander (Expedition 60); 24 June to 3 October 2019	Succeeded by Luca Parmitano
Preceded by Sunita Williams	ISS Commander (Expedition 72); 7 March to 18 April 2025	Succeeded by Takuya Onishi
