= Soyuz MS-10 =

Aborted 2018 Russian crewed spaceflight

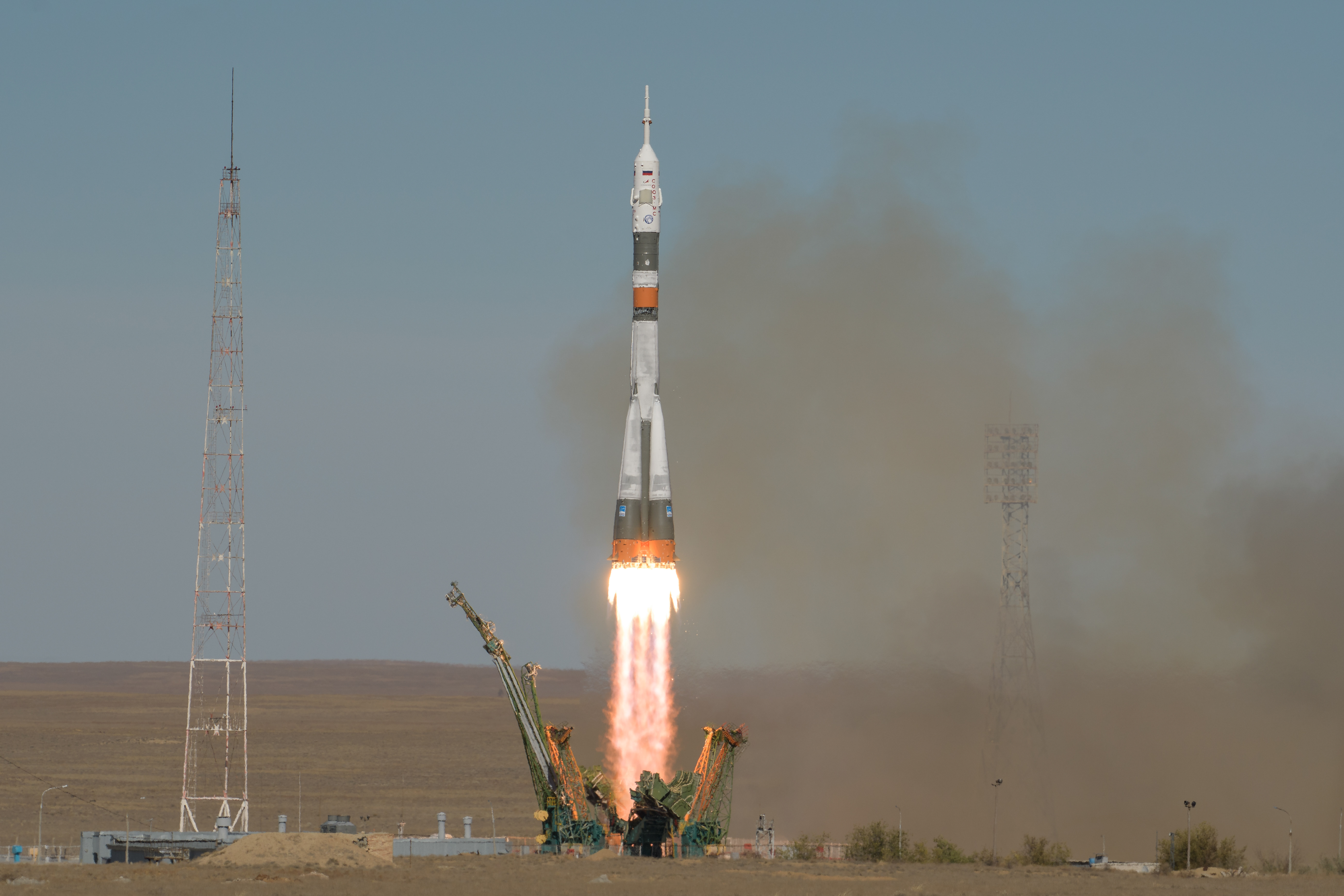
- Launch of the Soyuz-FG rocket carrying the MS-10 spacecraft
- Mission type: ISS crew transport (planned)
- Operator: Roscosmos
- Mission duration: 19 minutes, 41 seconds (achieved); 180 days (planned)
- Orbits completed: Failed to orbit
- Apogee: 93 km (58 mi) sub-orbital spaceflight

Spacecraft properties
- Spacecraft: Soyuz MS No. 740
- Spacecraft type: Soyuz MS (11F747)
- Manufacturer: Energia

Crew
- Members: Aleksey Ovchinin; Nick Hague
- Callsign: Burlak

Start of mission
- Launch date: 11 October 2018, 08:40 UTC
- Rocket: Soyuz-FG (U15000-064)
- Launch site: Baikonur, Pad 1/5
- Contractor: RKTs Progress

End of mission
- Landing date: 11 October 2018, 08:59 UTC
- Landing site: 20 km (12 mi) east of Jezkazgan, Kazakhstan
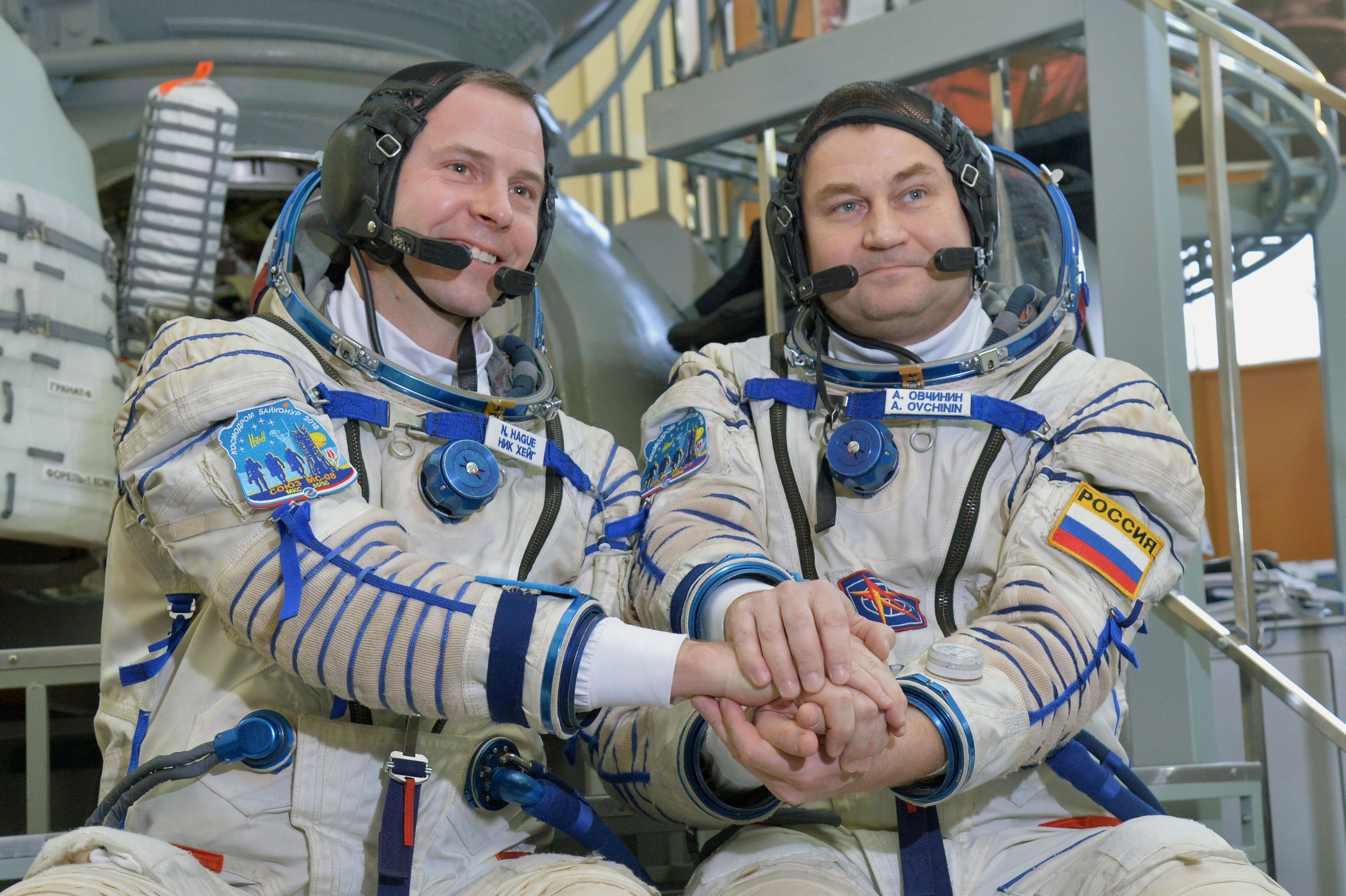
- Mission patch Hague and Ovchinin Soyuz programme (crewed)

Soyuz MS-10 was a crewed Soyuz MS spaceflight that aborted shortly after launch on 11 October 2018 due to a failure of the Soyuz-FG launch vehicle boosters. MS-10 was the 139th flight of a Soyuz spacecraft. It was intended to transport two members of the Expedition 57 crew to the International Space Station.

== History ==
A few minutes after liftoff, the craft went into contingency abort due to a booster failure and had to return to Earth. By the time the contingency abort was declared, the launch escape system (LES) tower had already been ejected and the capsule was pulled away from the rocket using the solid rocket jettison motors on the capsule fairing. Both crew members, Roscosmos cosmonaut Aleksey Ovchinin and NASA astronaut Nick Hague, were recovered in good health. The MS-10 flight abort was the first instance of a Russian crewed booster accident in 35 years, since Soyuz T-10-1 exploded on the launch pad in September 1983. On 1 November 2018, Russian scientists released a video recording of the mission.

== Crew ==
Prime crew
Position	Crew
Commander	(Russia) Aleksey Ovchinin, Roscosmos; Expedition 57; Second spaceflight
Flight engineer	(United States) Nick Hague, NASA; Expedition 57; First spaceflight

Backup crew
Position	Crew
Commander	(Russia) Oleg Kononenko, Roscosmos
Flight engineer	(Canada) David Saint-Jacques, CSA

== Mission ==
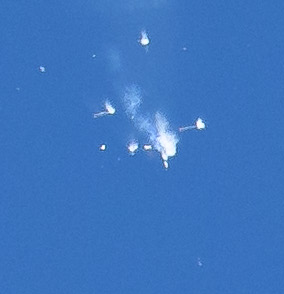
Launch vehicle, plume from escape tower, 4 boosters, and debris after separation

A few minutes after liftoff, which took place at 08:40 UTC, the crew reported feeling weightless, and mission control declared a booster had failed. According to Sergei Krikalev of Roscosmos, the primary cause of the failure was a collision that occurred during the separation of the carrier rocket's first and second stages. "A deviation from the standard trajectory occurred and apparently the lower part of the second stage disintegrated," he said. Shortly after, a contingency was declared and the spacecraft carrying the crew performed an emergency separation, returning to Earth in a ballistic trajectory, during which the crew experienced "about six to seven times Earth's gravity" followed by a successful landing. The abort occurred at an altitude of approximately 50 kilometres (31 miles); the spacecraft reached an apogee of 93 km (58 mi) then landed 19 minutes and 41 seconds after launch. At 08:55 UTC the search and rescue team was deployed to recover the crew and the spacecraft, which had landed 402 kilometres (250 mi) from the launch site and 20 kilometres (12 mi) east of Jezkazgan, Kazakhstan.

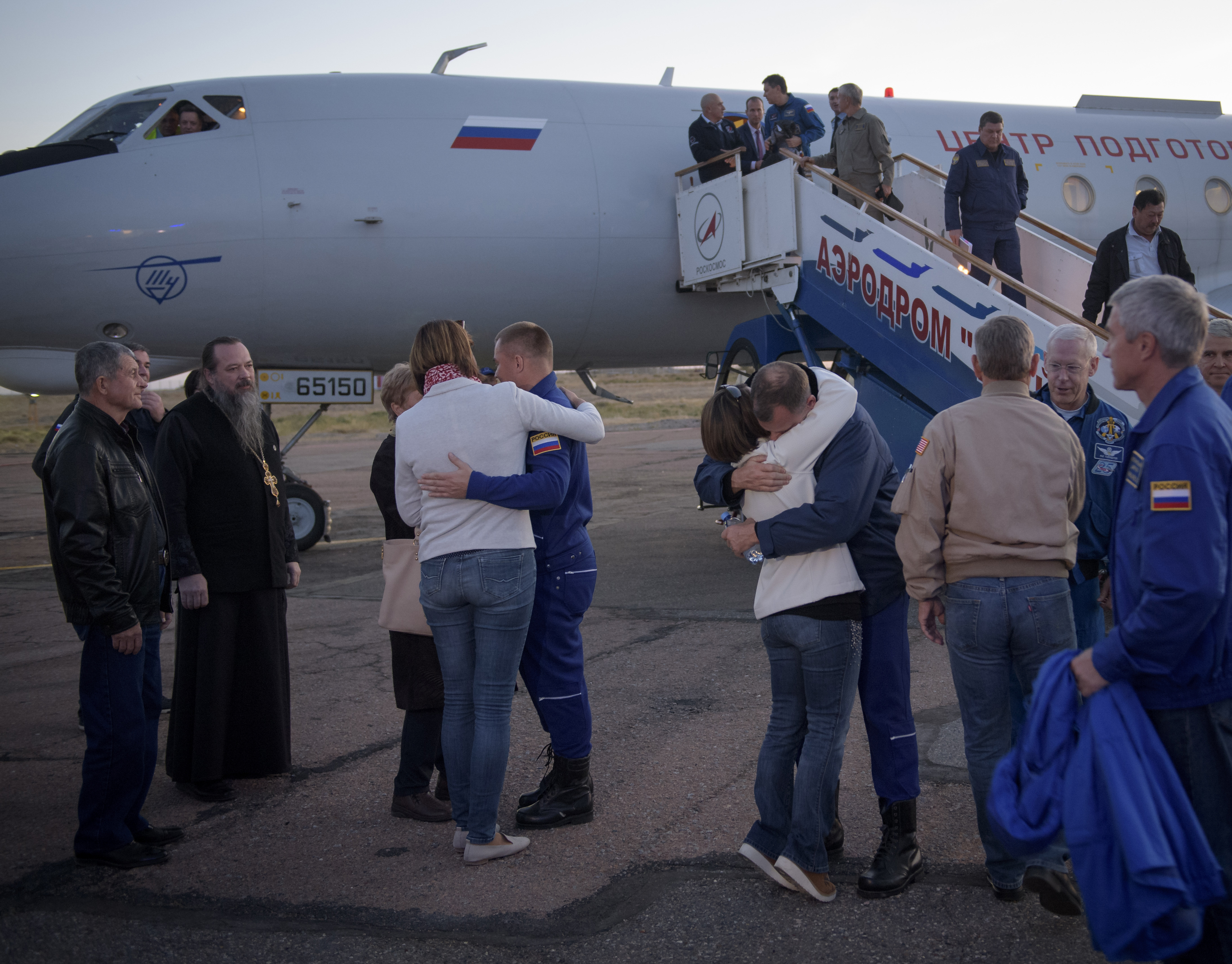
The crew greeting their families in Baikonur hours after emergency landing

Approximately 25 minutes after the search and rescue team took off, NASA announced they were in contact with Ovchinin and Hague. NASA TV broadcast photographs of the crew undergoing medical tests and apparently healthy at Jezkazgan Airport at 12:04 UTC. The crew flew to the Baikonur Cosmodrome to meet their families before leaving for Moscow.

== Aftermath ==
Following the aborted spaceflight, the Russian government announced that crewed Soyuz launches would be temporarily suspended. Roscosmos ordered a full state commission to investigate the incident, and the BBC reported that a criminal investigation was also expected. A few weeks prior to the failed launch, another investigation had commenced into how a hole came to be drilled into the wall of the Soyuz MS-09 capsule that was then docked at the International Space Station.

After collecting the debris of the rocket, the Soyuz MS-10 commission started the investigation on 15 October 2018. Initially a faulty cable connecting to the first stage booster was suspected, but by 17 October 2018 the commission was concentrating on the manufacturing sequence of the Soyuz rocket, and set the investigation deadline to 21 October 2018. By 18 October 2018, the failure to correctly mate the first stage booster with the first stage core was identified as the likely cause of the flight abort. The side booster was likely damaged and re-contacted the core during stage separation. On 22 October 2018, the investigation deadline was extended to 30 October 2018, with a preliminary report tentatively blaming a damaged separation sensor failing to activate the separation motor of one of the side boosters, similar to an uncrewed flight failure in 1986. The commission report was provided on 31 October 2018, concluding that a ball joint supporting the errant side booster was deformed during assembly, preventing proper separation of the side booster, while the sensor and separation motor had worked properly.

After the investigation identified an assembly error that would require no material change to the Soyuz-FG configuration, the next crewed Soyuz flight (MS-11) was scheduled for 3 December 2018. Within a day of the incident Dmitry Rogozin, chief of Roscosmos, said that Ovchinin and Hague would fly again in early 2019. In December 2018, it was announced that Ovchinin and Hague would fly on Soyuz MS-12 as part of Expedition 59/60 with Ovchinin serving as commander of Expedition 60. MS-12 launched successfully on 14 March 2019, achieving the mission that MS-10 had failed.

The MS-10 descent module was installed outside of Roscosmos headquarters. It was unveiled 2 December 2019.

Soyuz MS-10 was one of six Soyuz missions studied in a 2021 research paper looking into potential environmental damage caused by failed rocket launches. The rocket propellants of MS-10 were not found to have caused significant soil pollution at its crash sites.

== See also ==
- List of spaceflight-related accidents and incidents
- Soyuz abort history
