= Oleg Kononenko =

Turkmen-Russian cosmonaut (born 1964)

- Олег Кононенко
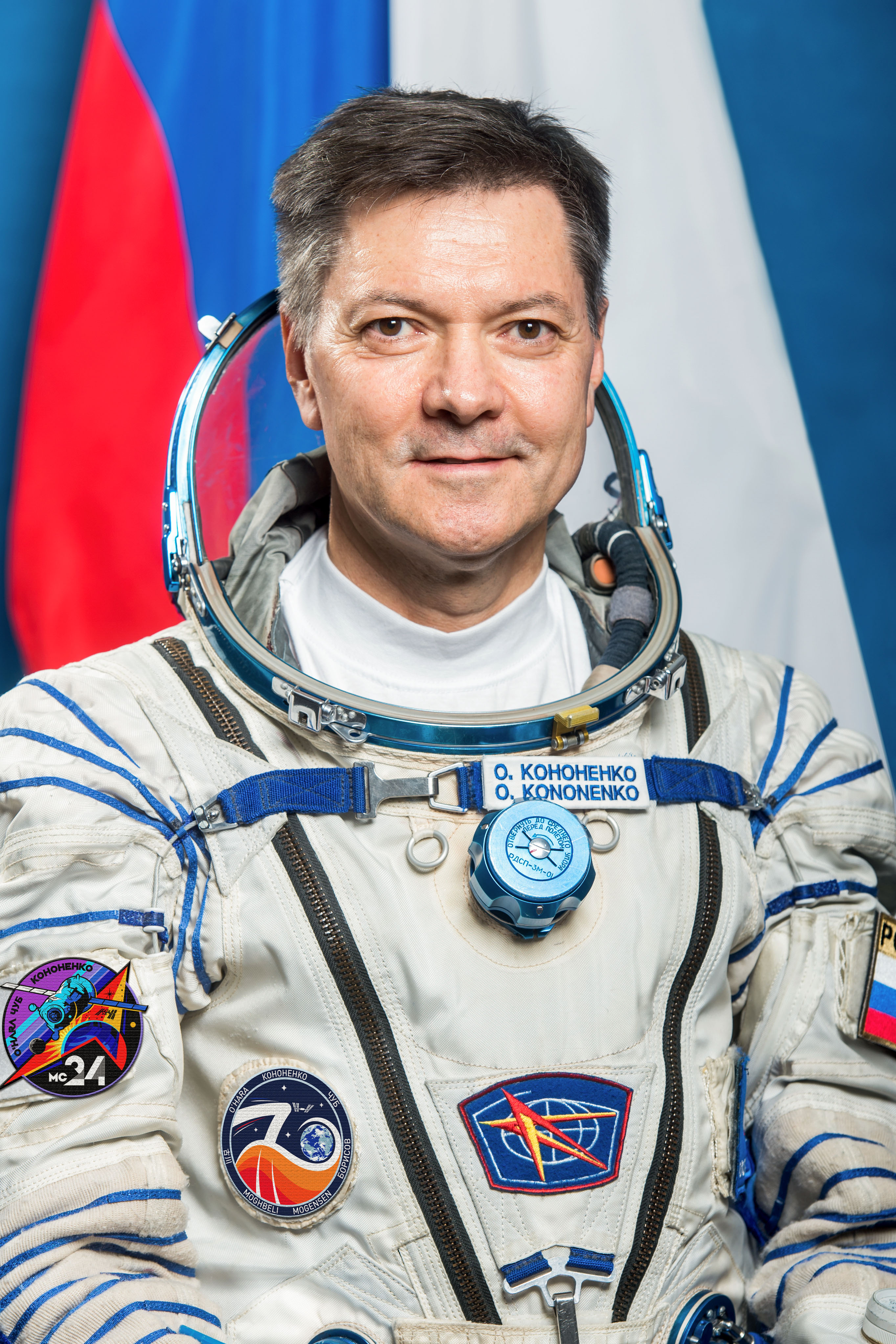
- Kononenko in 2022
- Born: Oleg Dmitriyevich Kononenko; 21 June 1964 (age 62); Chardzhou, Turkmen SSR, Soviet Union
- Occupation: Engineer
- Awards: Hero of the Russian Federation; Pilot-Cosmonaut of the Russian Federation; Hero of Turkmenistan; Order "For Merit to the Fatherland"
- Space career

Roscosmos cosmonaut
- Status: Active
- Time in space: 1,110 days, 14 hours, 57 minutes
- Selection: MKS Cosmonaut Group (1996)
- Total EVAs: 7
- Total EVA time: 44 hours, 30 minutes
- Mission: Soyuz TMA-12 (Expedition 17); Soyuz TMA-03M (Expedition 30/31); Soyuz TMA-17M (Expedition 44/45); Soyuz MS-11 (Expedition 57/58/59); Soyuz MS-24/MS-25 (Expedition 69/70/71); Soyuz MS-31 (Expedition 76/77)
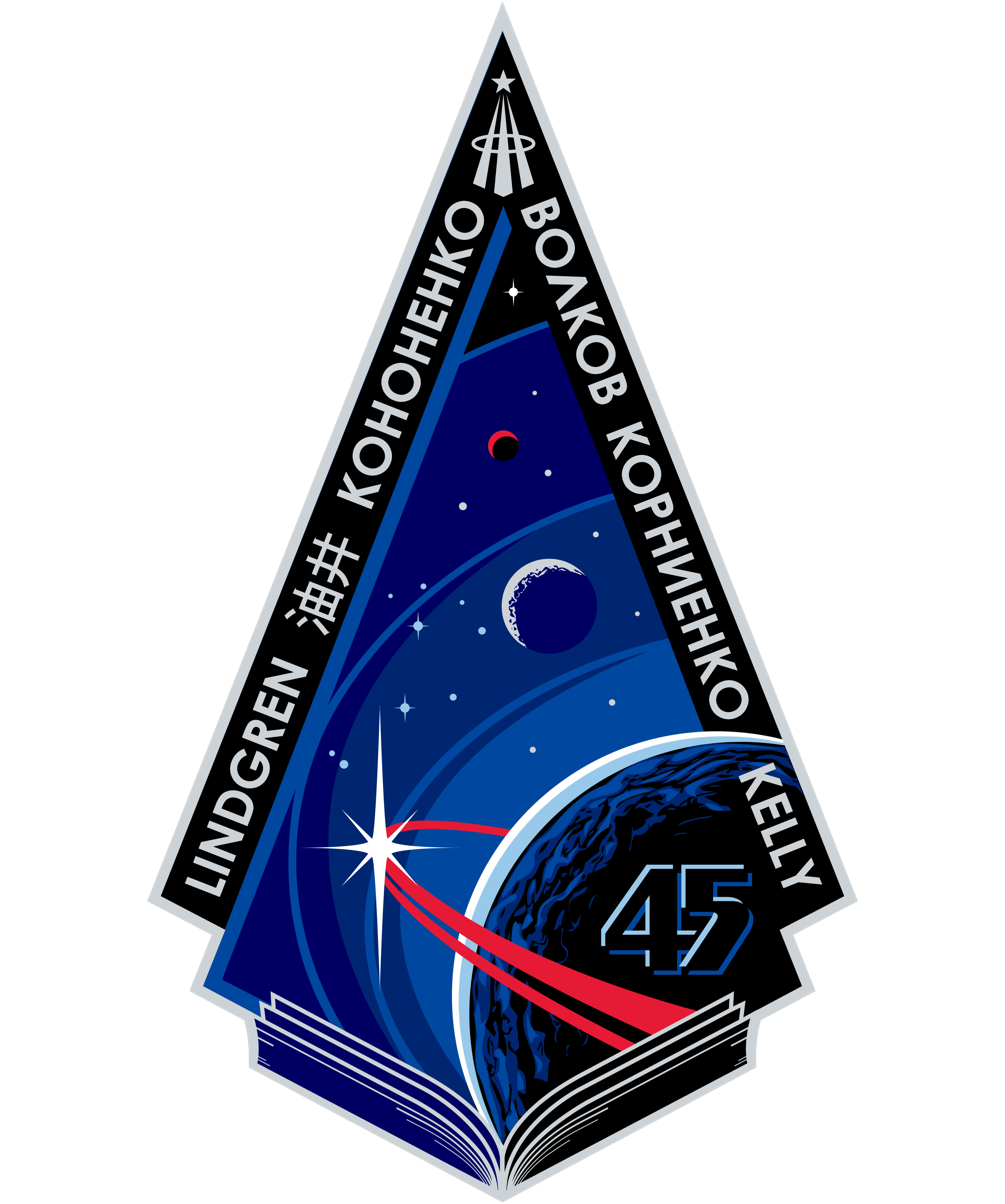
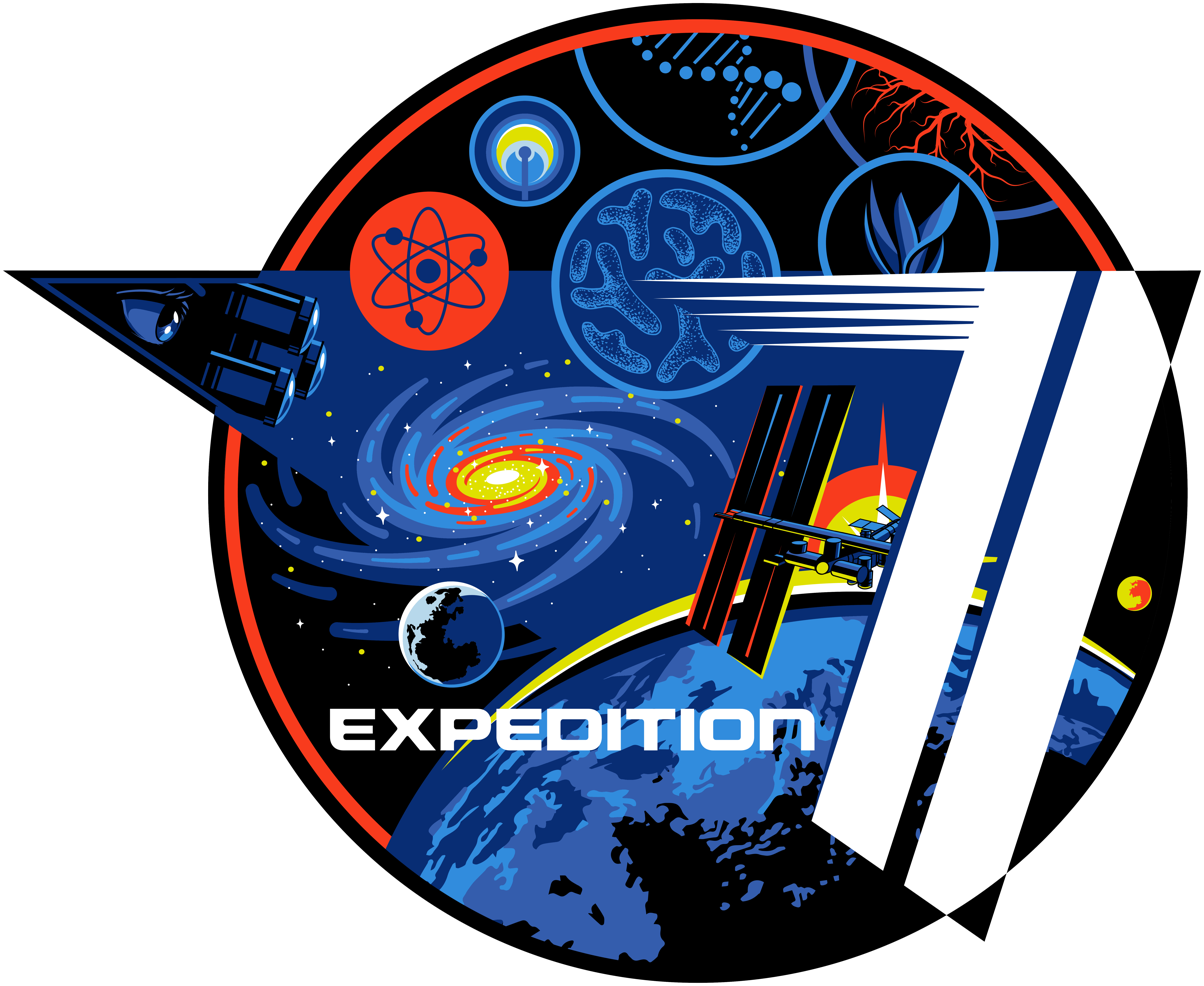
- Mission insignia

Oleg Dmitriyevich Kononenko (Russian: Олег Дмитриевич Кононенко; Turkmen: Oleg Dmitriýewiç Kononenko; born 21 June 1964) is a Russian cosmonaut. He has flown to the International Space Station five times as a flight engineer on Expedition 17 aboard Soyuz TMA-12, as a flight engineer on Expedition 30 and commander of Expedition 31 aboard Soyuz TMA-03M, as a flight engineer on Expedition 44 and Expedition 45 aboard Soyuz TMA-17M, as a flight engineer on Expedition 57 and commander of Expedition 58 and Expedition 59 aboard Soyuz MS-11, and as a flight engineer on Expedition 69 and Expedition 70 and commander of Expedition 71 aboard Soyuz MS-24/Soyuz MS-25, and he is expected to serve as commander of the Soyuz MS-31 mission scheduled for November 2027.

Kononenko has accumulated a record 1,111 days in space over the course of five long-duration missions on the ISS. He broke the previous record of 878 days, held by Gennady Padalka, on 4 February 2024, at 07:30:08 UTC.

== Early life and career ==
Oleg Kononenko was born on 21 June 1964 in Chardzhou, Turkmen SSR (now Türkmenabat, Turkmenistan) to a simple family. His father Dmitry Ivanovich Kononenko worked as a driver in a freight trucking company, and his mother Taisiya Stepanovna Churakova was a communications operator at the Türkmenabat Airport. Kononenko graduated from high school No. 15 of Turkmenabat city, where he received excellent marks in the subject of the Turkmen language.

=== Education ===
After school, Oleg Kononenko was not able to enter the Kharkov Aviation Institute the first time. He returned home, worked for a year in the tool shop of the Türkmenabat Airport aviation technical base. The second attempt was successful. Kononenko graduated from the N. E. Zhukovskiy Kharkiv Aviation Institute in 1988 as a mechanical engineer.

== Experience ==
After graduation, Kononenko worked at the Russian Space Agency's Central Specialized Design Bureau TsSKB-Progress in Kuybishev, starting as an engineer and working his way up to the leading design engineer. His responsibilities included system design, analysis, and development of spacecraft electrical power systems.

== Cosmonaut career ==
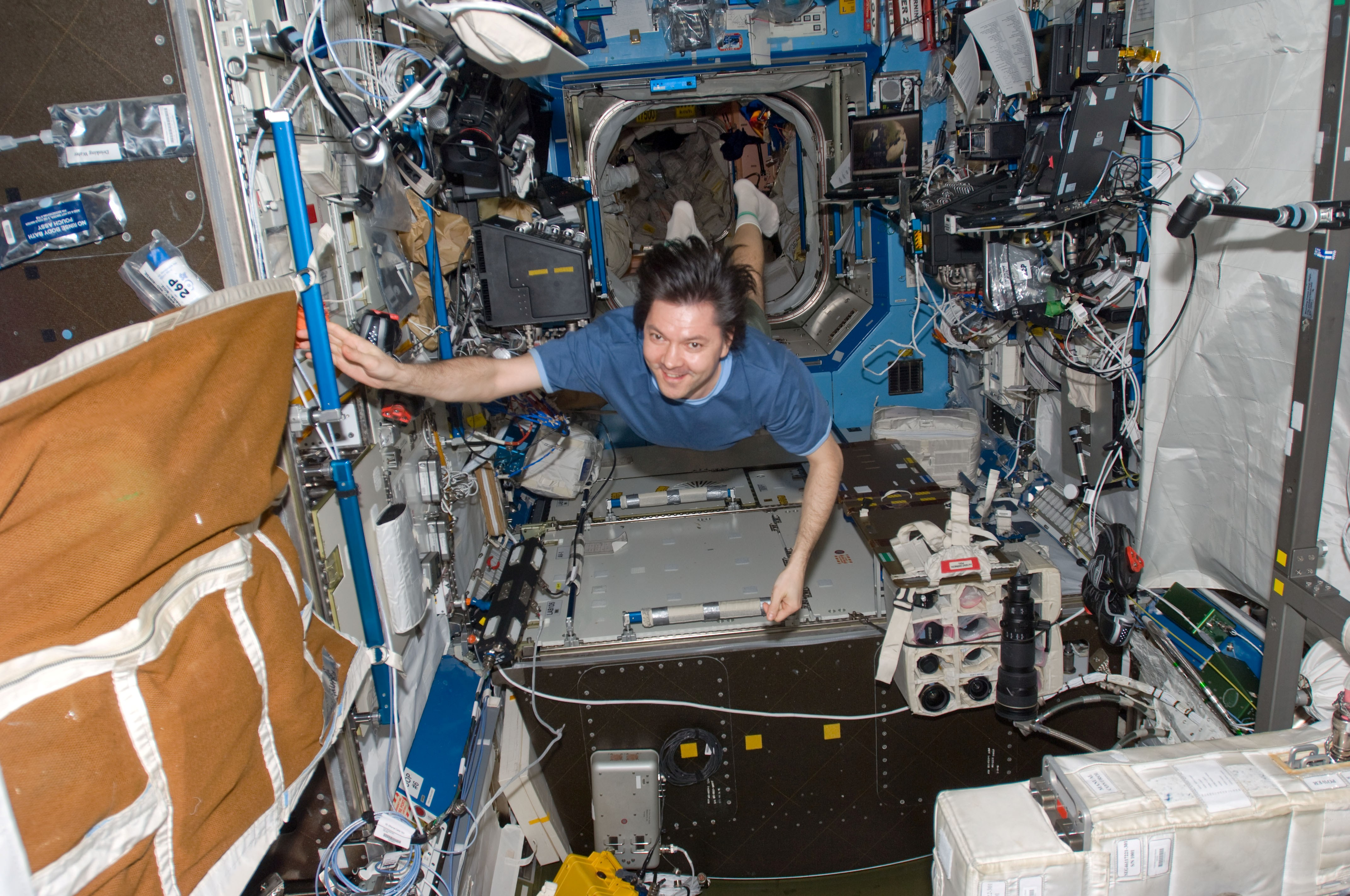
Oleg Kononenko floats through the Destiny Laboratory of the Space Station.

On 29 March 1996, Oleg was selected as a cosmonaut candidate by the Interagency Committee, and from June 1996 to March 1998, he underwent cosmonaut training at the Gagarin Cosmonaut Training Center, and on 20 March 1998, was awarded the title of test cosmonaut by the Interagency Qualification Committee. In October 1998 he began training as part of the group of cosmonauts selected for the International Space Station (ISS) program.

From December 2001 through April 2002, Kononenko trained as a backup flight engineer for the Soyuz TM-34 vehicle for the third ISS visiting crew. From March 2002 through February 2004, he trained as the flight engineer for the Soyuz TMA vehicle and the Expedition 9 and Expedition 11 primary crews. From March 2004 through March 2006, he trained as part of the group of cosmonauts selected for the ISS program. In March 2006, Kononenko began training as a flight engineer for the Soyuz TMA-12 vehicle and the Expedition 17 crew.

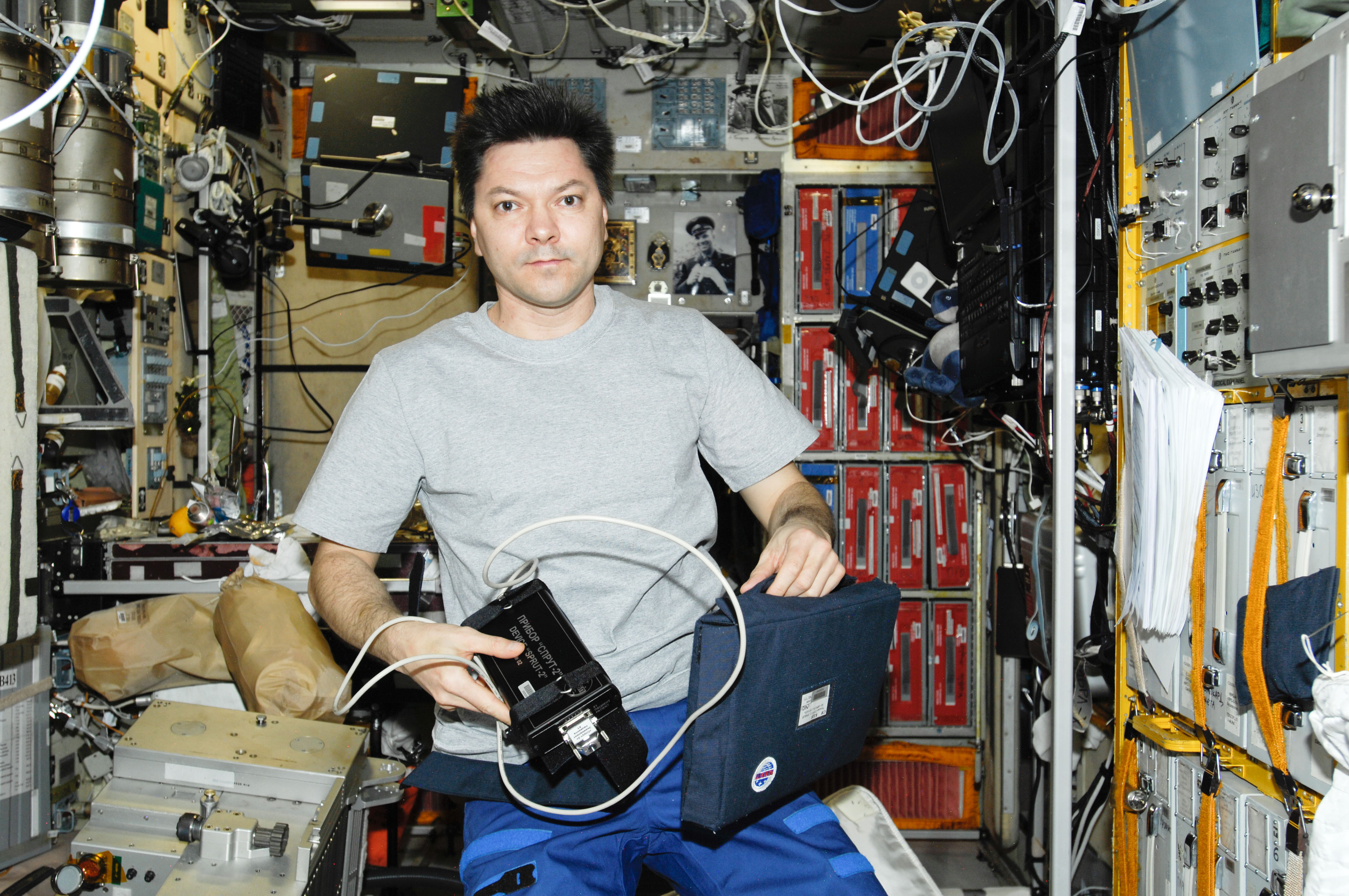
Expedition 30 flight engineer Oleg Kononenko performs a SPRUT-2 experiment run in the Zvezda Service Module of the Space Station.

=== Expedition 17 ===
Kononenko was a flight engineer on both the Expedition 17 mission to the International Space Station and the Soyuz TMA-12 mission that flew him there. The crew launched on 8 April 2008 and landed on 24 October 2008. Kononenko spent 199 days in space.

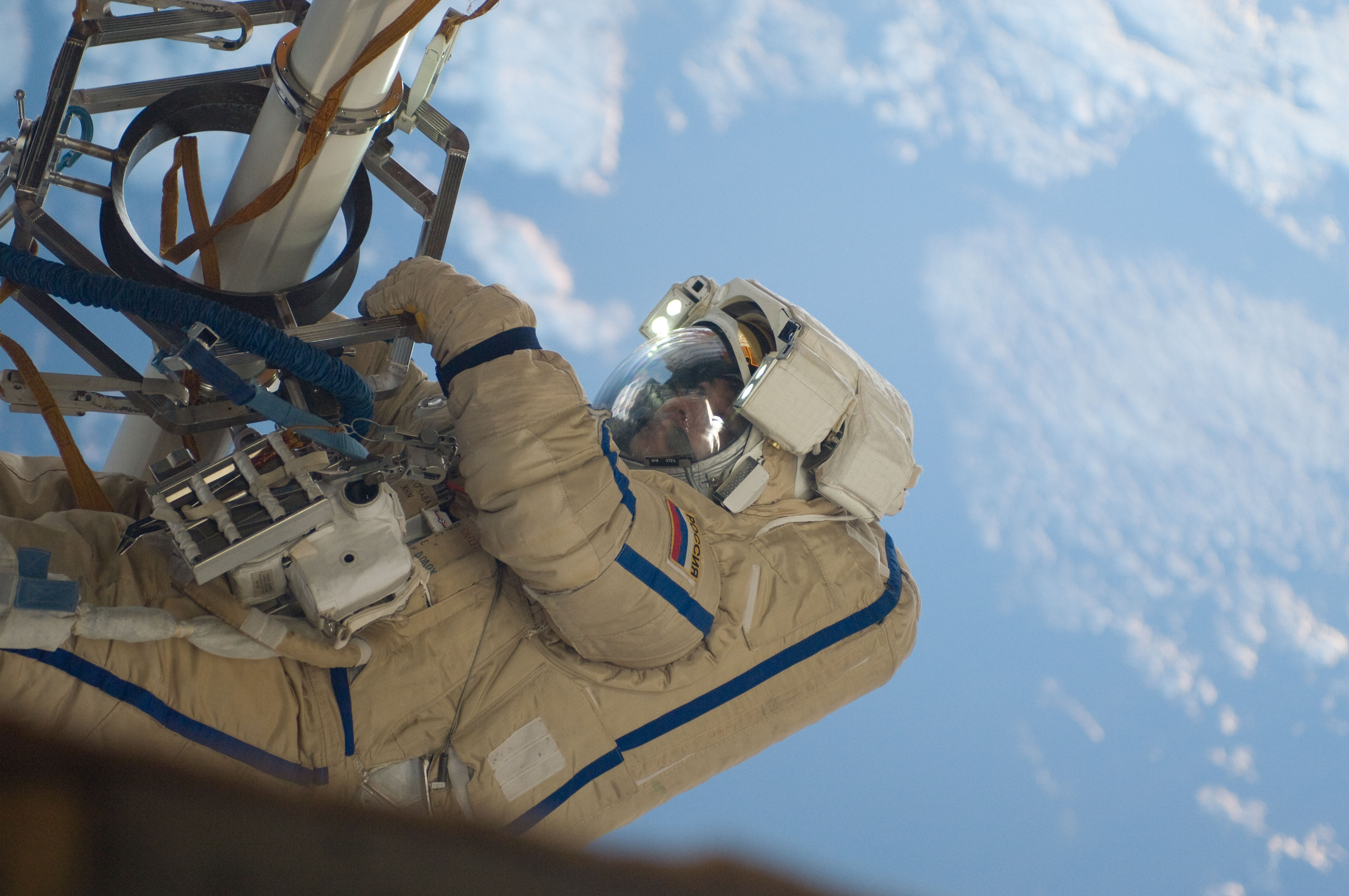
Spacewalker Oleg Kononenko seen outside the Space Station on 12 February 2012.

Kononenko conducted his first spacewalk on 10 July 2008 when he ventured into space from the Pirs docking compartment airlock of the ISS. He and cosmonaut Sergey Volkov inspected their Soyuz TMA-12 spacecraft and retrieved a pyro bolt from it. This spacewalk lasted 6 hours and 18 minutes.

On 15 July 2008, Kononenko again went outside from Pirs to conduct his second spacewalk. Kononenko and Volkov installed one experiment and retrieved another. They also continued to outfit the station's exterior, including the installation of a docking target on the Zvezda service module. The spacewalk was in Russian Orlan suits and Kononenko wore an Orlan suit with blue stripes. The spacewalk lasted 5 hours and 54 minutes.

Kononenko returned to Earth with Expedition 17 commander Sergei Volkov and spaceflight participant Richard Garriott (who launched aboard Soyuz TMA-13 to the ISS on 12 October 2008 with the Expedition 18 crew). They landed at 11:37 p.m EDT 55 miles north of Arkalyk, Kazakhstan. They were flown to the Baikonur Cosmodrome by helicopter, and then went on to Zvezdny Gorodok (Star City), Moscow.

=== Expedition 30/31 ===
On 21 December 2011, Kononenko, along with André Kuipers and Donald Pettit, launched to the International Space Station to join the crew of Expedition 30. He, along with his fellow crewmembers, arrived at the space station on December 23. On 12 February 2012, Kononenko and colleague cosmonaut Anton Shkaplerov were scheduled to conduct a six-hour spacewalk outside the ISS. They installed shields on the Zvezda Service Module to protect it from micrometeoroid orbital debris and moved the Strela 1 crane from the Pirs docking compartment to the Poisk Mini Research Module (MRM-2). The two cosmonauts also installed struts on a ladder used by spacewalkers on the Pirs Docking Compartment. As another get-ahead task, they also installed an experiment called Vynoslivost on the Poisk Mini Research Module. As part of the Vynoslivost or "Endurance" experiment, two trays of metal samples would be left exposed on the surface of the Poisk Module. The crew returned to Earth on 1 July 2012.

=== Expedition 44/45 ===
On 22 July 2015, Kononenko launched to the International Space Station as Soyuz commander, together with NASA astronaut Kjell Lindgren and Kimiya Yui from the Japan Aerospace Exploration Agency (JAXA) on Soyuz-TMA-17M. They spent 5 months on the International Space Station as members of the Expedition 44 and Expedition 45 crews. The trio returned to Earth in rare night landing on 11 December 2015, when their Soyuz TMA-17M landed safely on the steppe of Kazakhstan. Kononenko spent 142 days in space on his third mission.

=== Expedition 57/58/59 ===
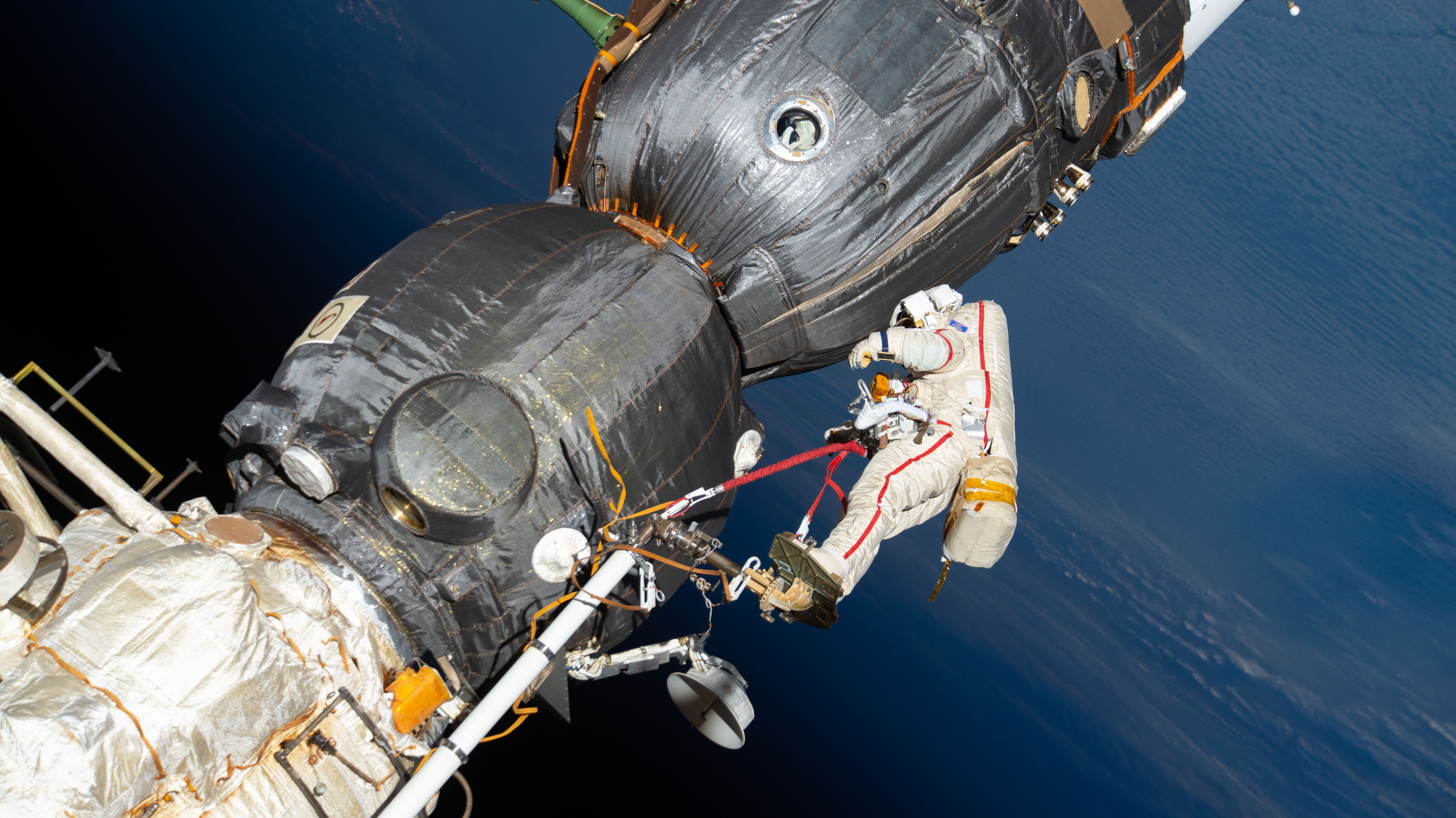
Kononenko on EVA to examine the external hull of Soyuz MS-09, standing on a Strela crane, on 11 December 2018

Kononenko launched towards the ISS for the fourth time as Soyuz commander of Soyuz MS-11 on 3 December 2018 as a flight engineer on Expedition 57. He was originally scheduled to be serving as a flight engineer on Expedition 58 and commander on Expedition 59, although due to the launch failure of Soyuz MS-10 on 11 October 2018, the original Expedition 58 commander, Aleksey Ovchinin was no longer aboard the station for Expedition 58, therefore Kononenko commanded both Expedition 58 and Expedition 59. Expedition 58 started on 20 December 2018 with the departure of Soyuz MS-09. Kononenko and fellow crew members Anne McClain and David Saint-Jacques returned to Earth on 24 June 2019, after 203 days 15 hours and 16 minutes in space.

Kononenko always warmly recalls his stay in his motherland - Turkmenistan. On 31 December 2018 Kononenko showed the flag of Turkmenistan and the book "Turkmenistan is the heart of the Great Silk Road" of Gurbanguly Berdymukhamedov from the ISS and wishes Happy New Year from the orbit of all Turkmenistan citizens. The astronaut also noted that he has special feelings for the country where he was born and grew up, proud and rejoiced at her achievements.

=== Expedition 69/70/71 ===
In June 2020, Kononenko announced that he was planned to return to the ISS. In September 2023, he launched aboard Soyuz MS-24. He was assigned for a year mission with his Russian crew member Nikolai Chub that started on September 15, 2023. As the mission lasted 374 days, Kononenko spent a total of 1,111 days in space by the time he returned to Earth on Soyuz MS-25. He broke the world record of 878 days in space held by Gennady Padalka on February 4, 2024 at 07:30:08 UTC. He later became the first person to stay 900, 1,000, and 1,100 days in space on 25 February 2024, 4 June 2024, and 12 September 2024 respectively.

== Personal life ==
Kononenko studied at a specialized school of volleyball and was a member of the youth team of Turkmenistan.

He is married to Tatyana Mikhailovna Kononenko (née Yurieva). They have a son, Andrey Olegovich Kononenko, and a daughter, Alisa Olegovna Kononenko. Oleg enjoys reading and team sports.

In 2015, he was elected to public office in Korolyov.

== Honors and awards ==
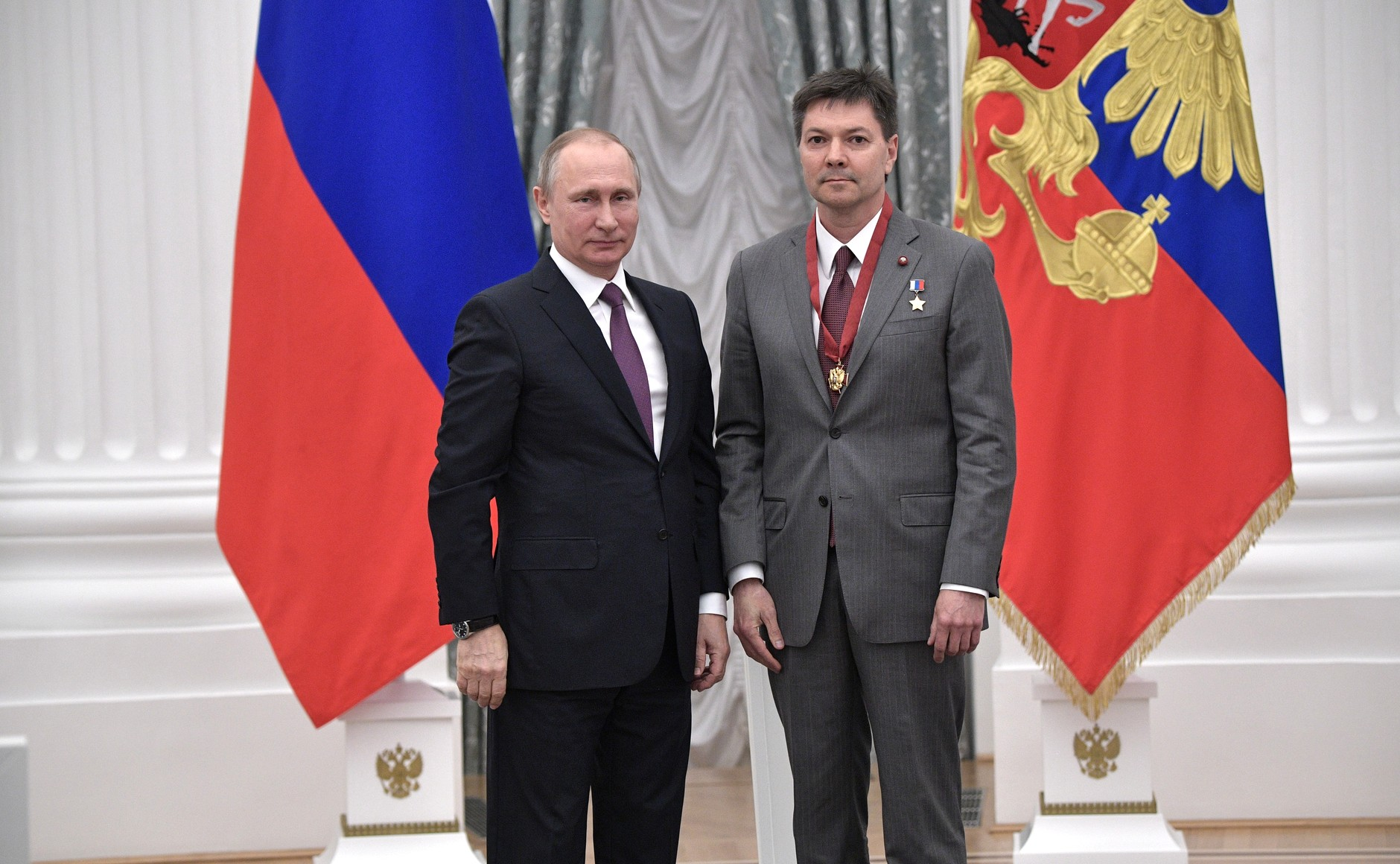
Hero of Russia Oleg Kononenko with the Russian president Vladimir Putin

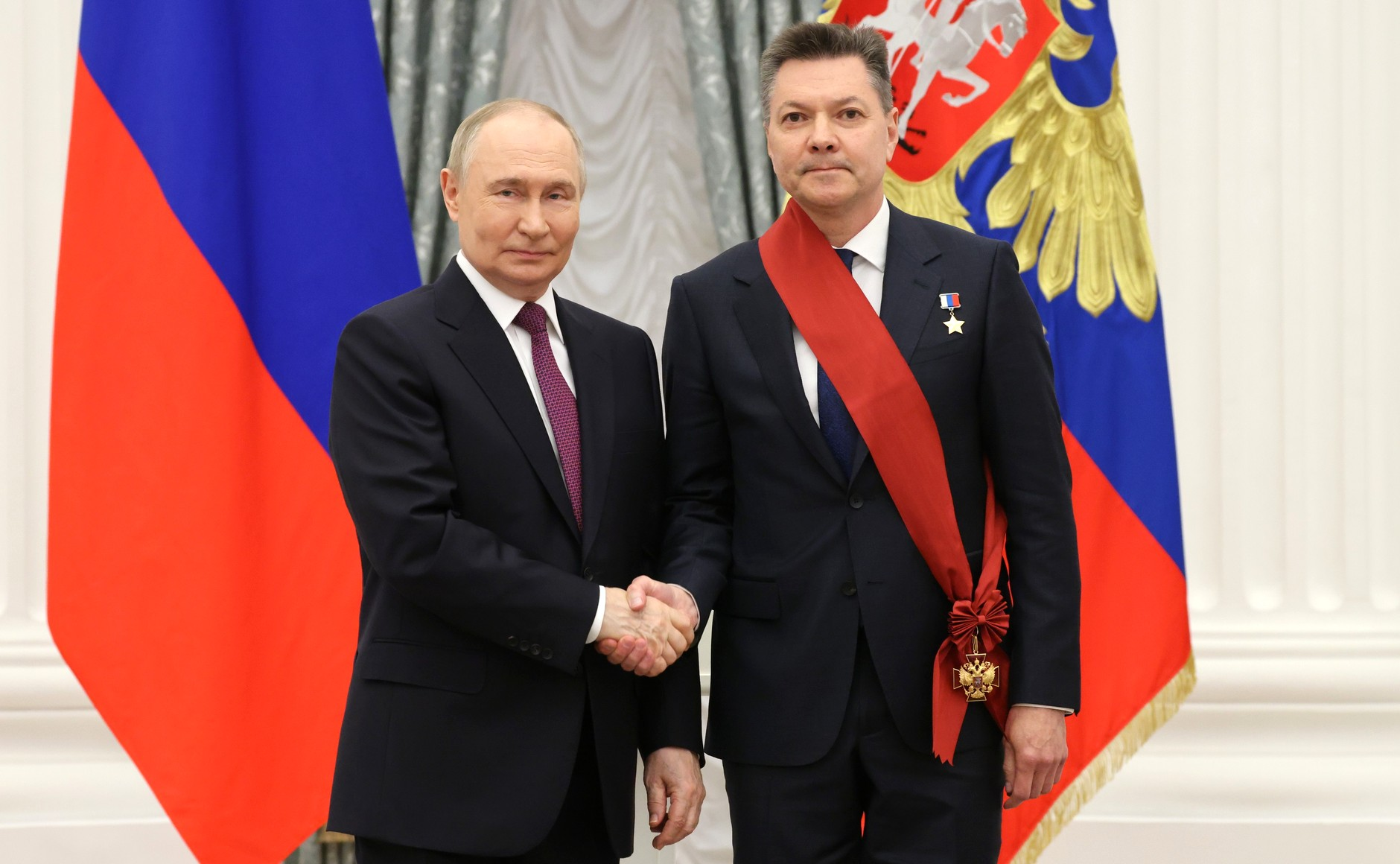
Presentation of the Order "For Merit to the Fatherland", 1st class (May 22, 2025)

- Hero of the Russian Federation (5 February 2009) - for courage and heroism during space flight
- Hero of Turkmenistan (2019)
- Medal "For Merit in Space Exploration" (12 April 2011) - for great achievements in the field of research, development and utilization of outer space, many years of diligent work, public activities
- Star of President Order (Turkmenistan, 16 February 2009) - In recognition of service to the government and people of Turkmenistan, for personal courage, professionalism and achievement in the performance of an international program of peaceful space exploration.
- Pilot-Cosmonaut of the Russian Federation (2009)
- Gagarin Medal
- Honorary Citizen of Gagarin, Smolensk Oblast (24 February 2011) - years of excellence, a deep sense of personal responsibility, the ability to navigate the complex situation and make the right decisions for his devotion to his country and the continuation of the stellar feats of Yuri Gagarin
- NASA Distinguished Public Service Medal (US, 2008)
- NASA Space Flight Medal (USA, 2008)

== Cultural impact ==
In September 2026, Oleg Kononenko voiced himself in an episode of the animated series Prostokvashino titled "Cosmic Record", produced by Soyuzmultfilm in collaboration with Roscosmos.

Preceded by Daniel Burbank	ISS Commander (Expedition 31); 27 April to 1 July 2012	Succeeded by Gennady Padalka
Preceded by Alexander Gerst	ISS Commander (Expedition 58/59); 20 December 2018 to 24 June 2019	Succeeded by Aleksey Ovchinin
Preceded by Andreas Mogensen	ISS Commander (Expedition 70/71); 10 March to 22 September 2024	Succeeded by Sunita Williams
