= Expedition 57 =

57th expedition to the International Space Station

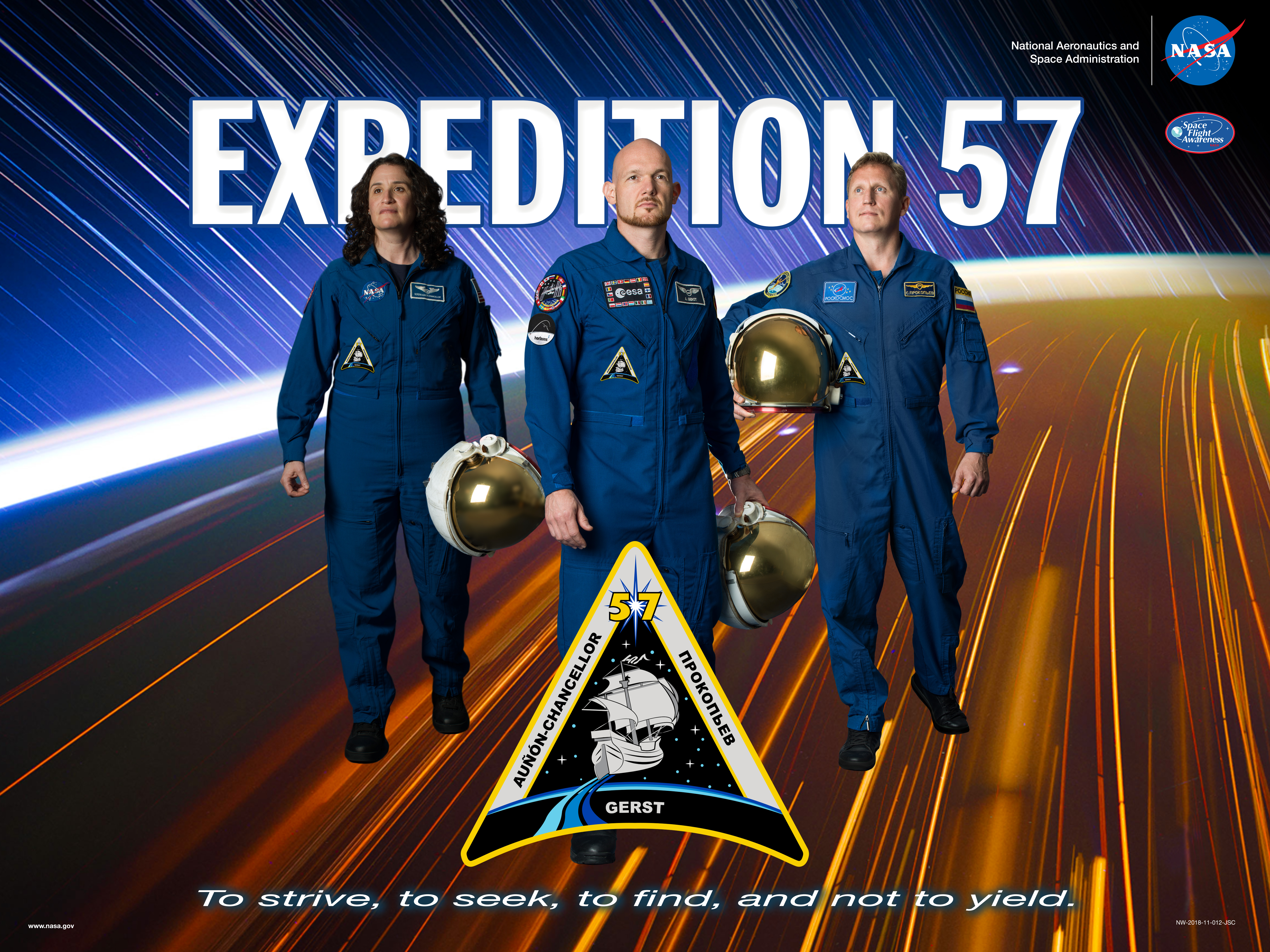
- Promotional Poster
- Mission type: Long-duration expedition
- Mission duration: 76 days, 17 hours, 43 minutes

Expedition
- Space station: International Space Station
- Began: 4 October 2018 UTC
- Ended: 20 December 2018 UTC
- Arrived aboard: Soyuz MS-09; Soyuz MS-11
- Departed aboard: Soyuz MS-09; Soyuz MS-11

Crew
- Crew size: 3–6
- Members: Expedition 56/57: Alexander Gerst; Serena M. Auñón-Chancellor; Sergey Prokopyev; Expedition 57/58/59: Oleg Kononenko; Anne McClain; David Saint-Jacques
- EVAs: 1
- EVA duration: 7 hours, 45 minutes
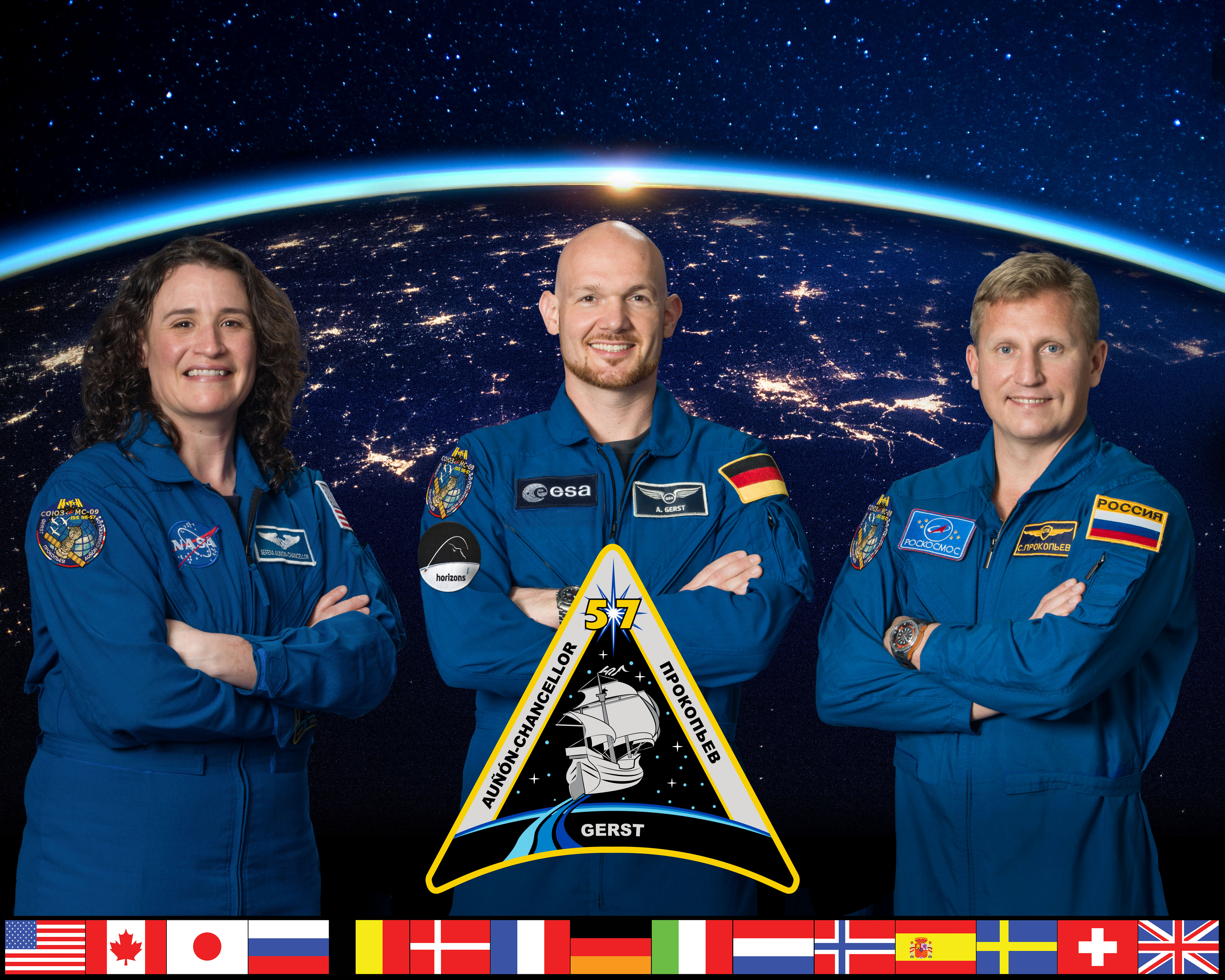
- Expedition 57 mission patch From left: Auñón-Chancellor, Gerst and Prokopyev ISS expeditions

Expedition 57 was the 57th expedition to the International Space Station, which began on October 4, 2018, upon the departure of Soyuz MS-08.

== History ==
Soyuz MS-09 crew, Alexander Gerst, Serena M. Auñón-Chancellor, and Sergey Prokopyev, since June 2018 aboard the ISS, were expected to be joined by Aleksey Ovchinin and Nick Hague in October 2018. The latter two crew members boarded Soyuz MS-10 on October 11, 2018, but the launch was aborted mid-flight due to a booster failure; the crew landed safely after a ballistic descent.

The impact of the Soyuz MS-10 failure and subsequent investigation on the ISS crew schedule was not initially clear. The Expedition 57 initial crew needed to depart by mid-December 2018 in Soyuz MS-09 due to the limited on-orbit lifespan of "about 200 days" of the Soyuz capsule, or no later than early January 2019 allowing for a small margin on the lifespan. NASA would have attempted to avoid de-crewing the ISS, commanding the station from the ground is feasible if necessary.

On 23 October 2018, NASA administrator Jim Bridenstine announced that Soyuz flights to the ISS were expected to resume in December 2018. The Soyuz MS-11 spacecraft commanded by cosmonaut Oleg Kononenko, carrying him and two flight engineers, Anne McClain and David Saint-Jacques, was launched on December 3, 2018, marking the 100th orbital launch of the year; the Expedition 57 initial crew departed on December 20 and Expedition 58 started as a three-person increment.

== Crew ==
Position	(First part) October 4 – December 3, 2018	(Second part) December 3–20, 2018
Commander	Alexander Gerst, ESA; Second spaceflight	
Flight engineer	Serena M. Auñón-Chancellor, NASA; Only spaceflight	
Flight engineer	Sergey Prokopyev, RSA; First spaceflight	
Flight engineer	Off station	Oleg Kononenko, RSA; Fourth spaceflight
Flight engineer	Off station	Anne McClain, NASA; First spaceflight
Flight engineer	Off station	David Saint-Jacques, CSA; First spaceflight

Originally, NASA astronaut Jeanette Epps was assigned as flight engineer for Expeditions 56 and 57, becoming the first African American space station crew member and the 15th African American to fly in space, but on January 16, 2018, NASA announced that Epps had been replaced by her backup Serena M. Auñón-Chancellor. On January 20, Epps' brother Henry posted a statement on Facebook, since deleted, that "My sister Dr. Jeannette Epps has been fighting against oppressive racism and misogyny in NASA and now they are holding her back and allowing a Caucasian Astronaut to take her place!" Jeanette Epps stated that she could not comment on her brother's post or the reason why she was pulled off the mission, but did state that she has no medical condition or family problem preventing her from flying, and that her training had been successful. The Washington Post stated that "Last-minute crew changes are not unusual at NASA."

Cosmonaut Nikolai Tikhonov was slated to make his first spaceflight on the Soyuz MS-10 spacecraft, but was removed from the crew due to delays in launching the Russian Nauka module. This is the second time that Tikhonov has been removed from an ISS crew for such reason.

== Spacewalks ==
EVA #	Spacewalkers	Start (UTC)	End (UTC)	Duration
Expedition 57; EVA 1*	Oleg Kononenko; Sergey Prokopyev	December 11, 2018; 15:59	December 11, 2018; 23:44	7 hours, 45 minutes
Expedition 57; EVA 1*	The cosmonauts went outside to install a plug and thermal insulation on the Soyuz MS-09 spacecraft which was damaged by a powertool causing an air leak. The cosmonauts gave Soyuz MS-09 a clean bill of health before they patched it up clearing the vessel for entry on December 20, 2018. Get ahead task included swapping experiments on the Rassvet module.			

Statement about spacewalks in an interview with the NASA International Space Station Program Manager Kirk Shireman while at the launch of Expedition 56-57 from the Baikonur Cosmodrome to the International Space Station

*denotes spacewalks performed from the Pirs docking compartment in Russian Orlan suits.

== Uncrewed spaceflights to the ISS ==
Resupply missions that visited the International Space Station during Expedition 57:

Spacecraft – ISS flight number	Country	Mission	Launcher	Launch (UTC)	Docked/Berthed (UTC) ^{†}	Undocked/Unberthed (UTC)	Duration (Docked)	Deorbit
Progress MS-10 – ISS 71P	Russia	Logistics	Soyuz-FG	16 Nov 2018, 18:14:08	18 Nov 2018, 19:28	4 Jun 2019, 08:40	197d 13h 12m	4 Jun 2019, 08:40
Cygnus NG-10 – CRS NG-10E	United States	Logistics	Antares 230	17 Nov 2018, 09:01:31	19 Nov 2018, 12:31	8 Feb 2019, 16:16	81d 3h 45m	Feb. 25, 2019, 09:05
SpaceX CRS-16 – CRS SpX-16	United States	Logistics	Falcon 9 Block 5	5 Dec 2018, 18:16	8 Dec 2018, 15:36	13 Jan 2019, 23:33	36d 7h 57m	14 Jan 2019
