= David Saint-Jacques =

Canadian astronaut (born 1970)

David Saint-Jacques OC OQ FRCGS
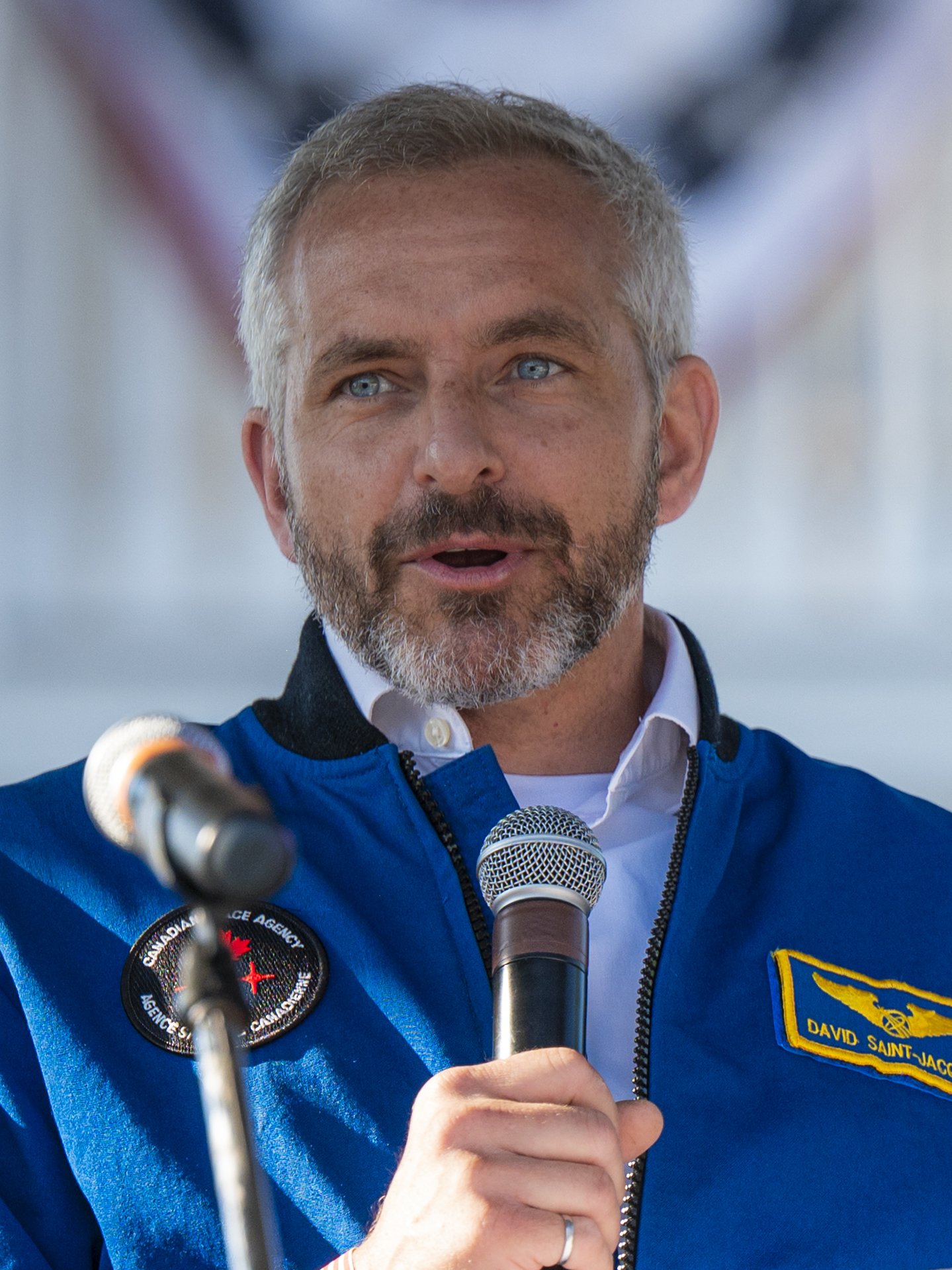
- Saint-Jacques in 2026
- Born: 6 January 1970 (age 56); Quebec City, Quebec, Canada
- Education: Polytechnique Montréal (BEng); Corpus Christi College, Cambridge (PhD); Université Laval (MD)
- Space career

CSA astronaut
- Time in space: 203 days, 15 hours, 16 minutes
- Selection: 2009 CSA Group; NASA Group 20 (2009)
- Total EVAs: 1
- Total EVA time: 6 hours, 29 minutes
- Missions: Soyuz MS-11 (Expedition 57/58/59)
- Mission insignia
- Scientific career
- Fields: Astrophysics
- Thesis: Astronomical Seeing in Space and Time: A Study of Atmospheric Turbulence in Spain and England, 1994–98 (1999)

David Saint-Jacques OC OQ FRCGS (Quebec French: [davɪd sẽɪ̯̃nʒã(ŋ)k̚], French pronunciation: [david sɛ̃ʒak]; born 6 January 1970) is a Canadian astronaut with the Canadian Space Agency (CSA). He is also an astrophysicist, engineer and a physician.

In December 2018, he launched to the International Space Station, as flight engineer on Expeditions 57, 58 and 59; he returned to Earth on 25 June 2019.

== Astronaut career ==
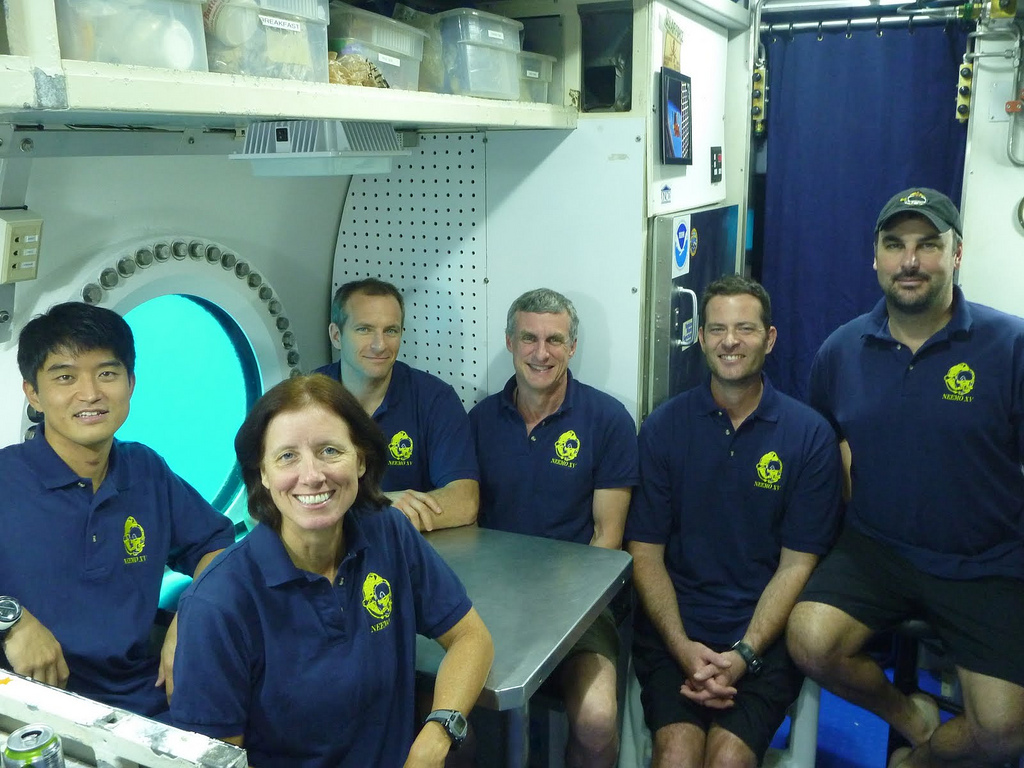
The NEEMO 15 crew. Left to right: Takuya Onishi, Shannon Walker, Saint-Jacques, Steve Squyres, and Aquarius habitat technicians Nate Bender and James Talacek

Saint-Jacques was selected in May 2009 by the Canadian Space Agency (CSA) as one of two CSA astronaut positions, after a long process selection attended by 5,351 candidates, and moved to Houston to be one of 14 members of the 20th NASA astronaut class. He then graduated from Astronaut Candidate Training that included scientific and technical briefings, intensive instruction in International Space Station systems, extravehicular activity (EVA), robotics, physiological training, T-38 flight training, Russian language and water and wilderness survival training. Since graduation, he has been assigned to the Robotics Branch of the Astronaut Office.

=== NEEMO 15 ===
On 19 September 2011, NASA announced that Saint-Jacques would serve as an aquanaut aboard the Aquarius underwater laboratory during the NEEMO 15 undersea exploration mission from 17 to 30 October 2011. Delayed by stormy weather and high seas, the mission began on 20 October 2011. On the afternoon of 21 October, Saint-Jacques and his crewmates officially became aquanauts, having spent over 24 hours underwater. NEEMO 15 ended early on 26 October due to the approach of Hurricane Rina.

=== CAVES 2013 ===
In 2013, Saint-Jacques served as cavenaut into the ESA CAVES training in Sardinia, alongside Soichi Noguchi, Andreas Mogensen, Nikolai Tikhonov, Andrew Feustel and Michael Fincke.

=== Expeditions 57/58/59 ===
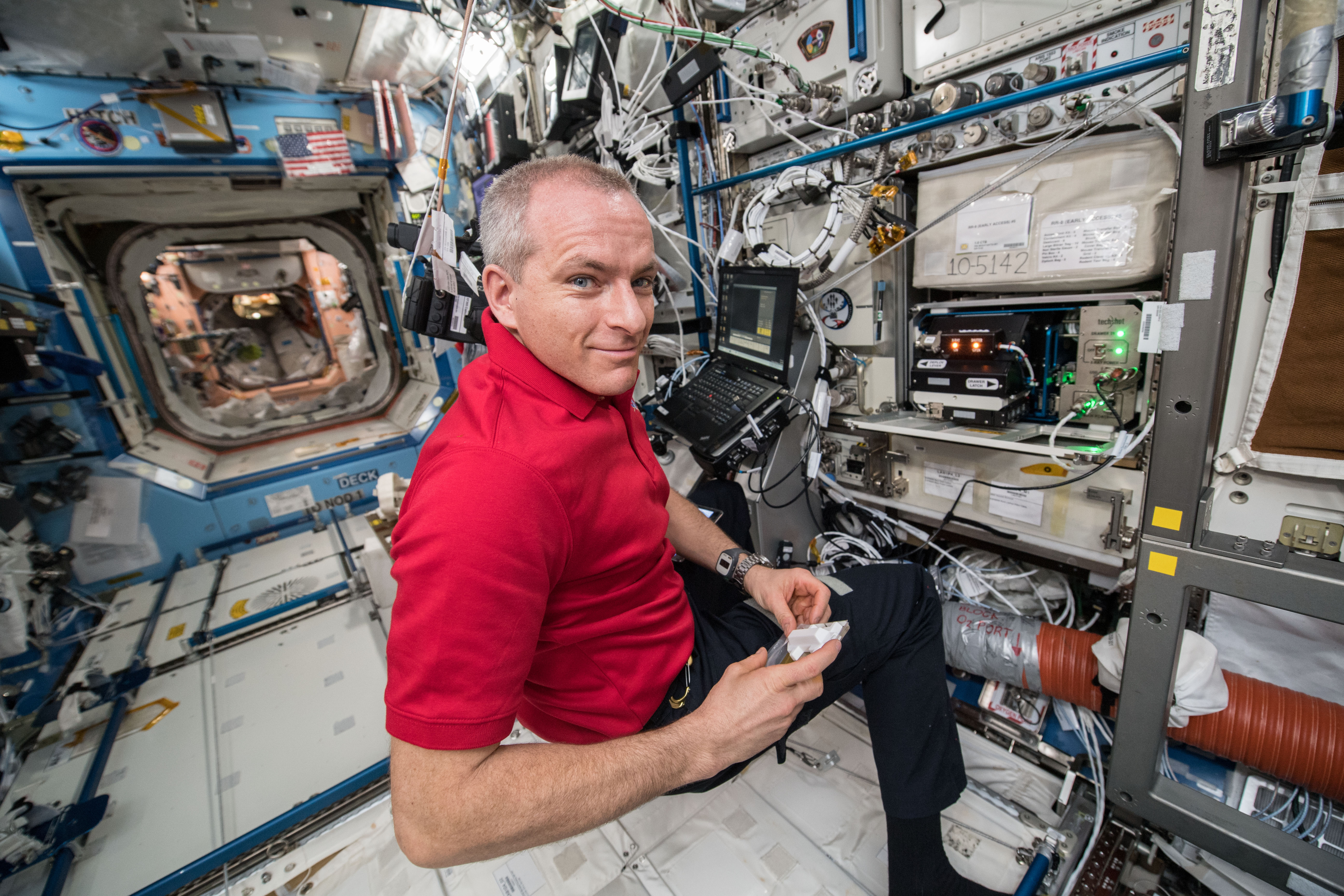
Saint-Jacques completes the Bone Densitometer calibration in support of the Rodent Research-8 investigation during Expedition 57 at the Destiny lab.

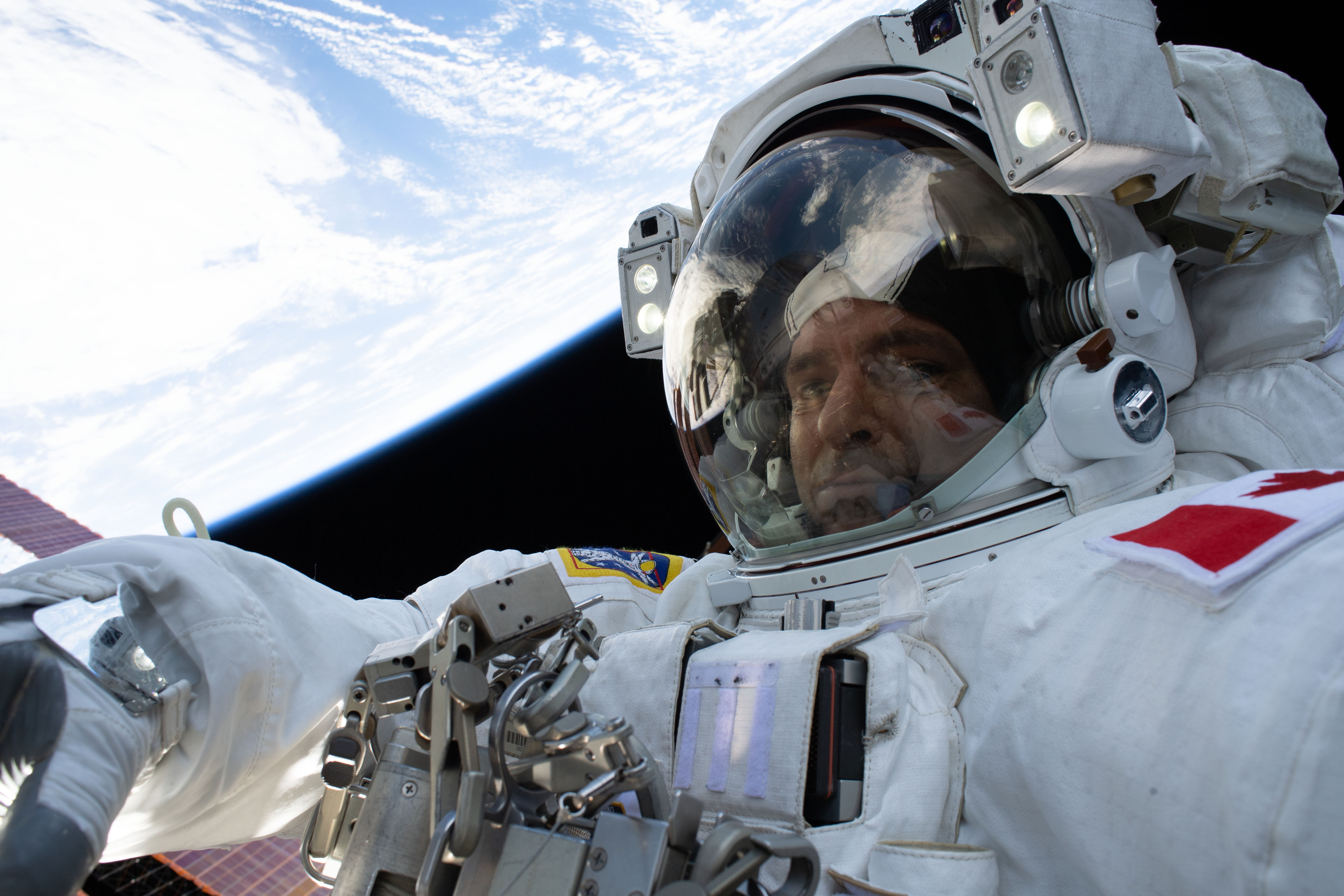
Saint-Jaques during his first spacewalk, on ISS Expedition 59

In May 2016 Saint-Jacques was selected as a member of ISS Expedition 58/59, which at the time was scheduled to start in November 2018.

On 3 December 2018, Saint-Jacques launched to the ISS on board Soyuz MS-11, alongside commander Oleg Kononenko and fellow flight engineer Anne McClain. He became a member of the Expedition 57 crew for two weeks before transferring to Expedition 58, which officially started on 20 December 2018 when the Expedition 57 crew left the station. Saint-Jacques, Kononenko and McClain subsequently transferred to Expedition 59 on 14 March 2019 with the arrival of Soyuz MS-12.

On 8 April 2019, Saint-Jacques conducted his first spacewalk, becoming the fourth Canadian astronaut to take part in an EVA and the first to do so in 12 years. The spacewalk lasted roughly seven hours.

Saint-Jacques, McClain and Kononenko returned to Earth on board Soyuz MS-11 on 24 June 2019.

== Education and earlier career ==
Saint-Jacques holds a Bachelor of Engineering in Engineering Physics from Polytechnique Montréal, an engineering school affiliated with Université de Montréal, where he graduated in 1993. He later graduated in 1998 with a Doctor of Philosophy in astrophysics, from the Cavendish Astrophysics Group at Corpus Christi College, Cambridge. Saint-Jacques completed postdoctoral research at the National Astronomical Observatory of Japan between 1999 and 2001, where he worked on the development and application of the Mitaka Infrared Interferometer in Japan and the Subaru Telescope Adaptive Optics System in Hawaii. He also holds a Doctor of Medicine from Université Laval completed in 2005 and completed a family medicine residency at McGill University (2007) (specializing in first-line, isolated medical practice).

His broad scientific background includes engineering, astrophysics and medical training, with international experience in France and Hungary for engineering study and Lebanon and Guatemala for medical study. Saint-Jacques is affiliated with the Collège des médecins du Québec, the College of Family Physicians of Canada, Ordre des ingénieurs du Québec, International Society for Optical Engineering, and the Cambridge Philosophical Society as a life fellow. Saint-Jacques began his career in 1996 as a biomedical engineer at the Quebec firm Electromed with secondment to Lariboisière Hospital, working on the design of radiological equipment for angiography and image analysis algorithms of cineangiography.

From 1994 to 1998, his studies included theoretical work on astronomical observation and design, fabrication and commissioning of instruments for the Cambridge Optical Aperture Synthesis Telescope and for the William Herschel Telescope in the Canary Islands. During the course of this research under supervisor John E. Baldwin he made several trips abroad on sponsorship from the Particle Physics and Astronomy Research Council, the Cavendish Astrophysics Group, Corpus Christi College and the Cambridge Philosophical Society, and decided to pursue further research experience in Japan. In 2001, he joined the Astrophysics group at the Department de physique, Université de Montréal.

Prior to joining the Canadian Space Agency, Saint-Jacques was a physician and the co-chief of Medicine at Inuulitsivik Health Centre in Puvirnituq, Quebec, from 2007. He also worked as a Clinical Faculty lecturer for McGill University's Faculty of Medicine, supervising medical trainees in Nunavik.

== Personal life ==
Saint-Jacques was born in Quebec City and raised in Montreal. Saint-Jacques is married to Dr. Véronique Morin and has three children. He is a lifelong mountaineer, hiker, cyclist, skier and sailor. He also holds a commercial pilot license. He is fluent in French and English, and has a basic understanding of Russian, Spanish and Japanese.

== Academic distinctions ==
- "1967" Science and Engineering Scholarship, Natural Sciences and Engineering Research Council of Canada (NSERC) (1994–1998)
- Cambridge Commonwealth Trust Honorary Scholar (1994–1998)
- United Kingdom Overseas Research Student Award (1994–1998)
- Postdoctoral Fellowship, Japan Society for Promotion of Science (1999–2001)
- Scholarship, Canada Millennium (2001–2005)
- Doctorat Honoris Causa, École polytechnique de Montréal of Université de Montréal (2010)

== Honors and awards ==
- Fellow of the Royal Canadian Geographical Society
- Gold Medal of the Royal Canadian Geographical Society
- Special distinction from the Collège des médecins du Québec
- Officier of the National Order of Quebec (2020)
- Officer of the Order of Canada (2022)
