= Soyuz MS-11 =

2018 Russian crewed spaceflight to the ISS

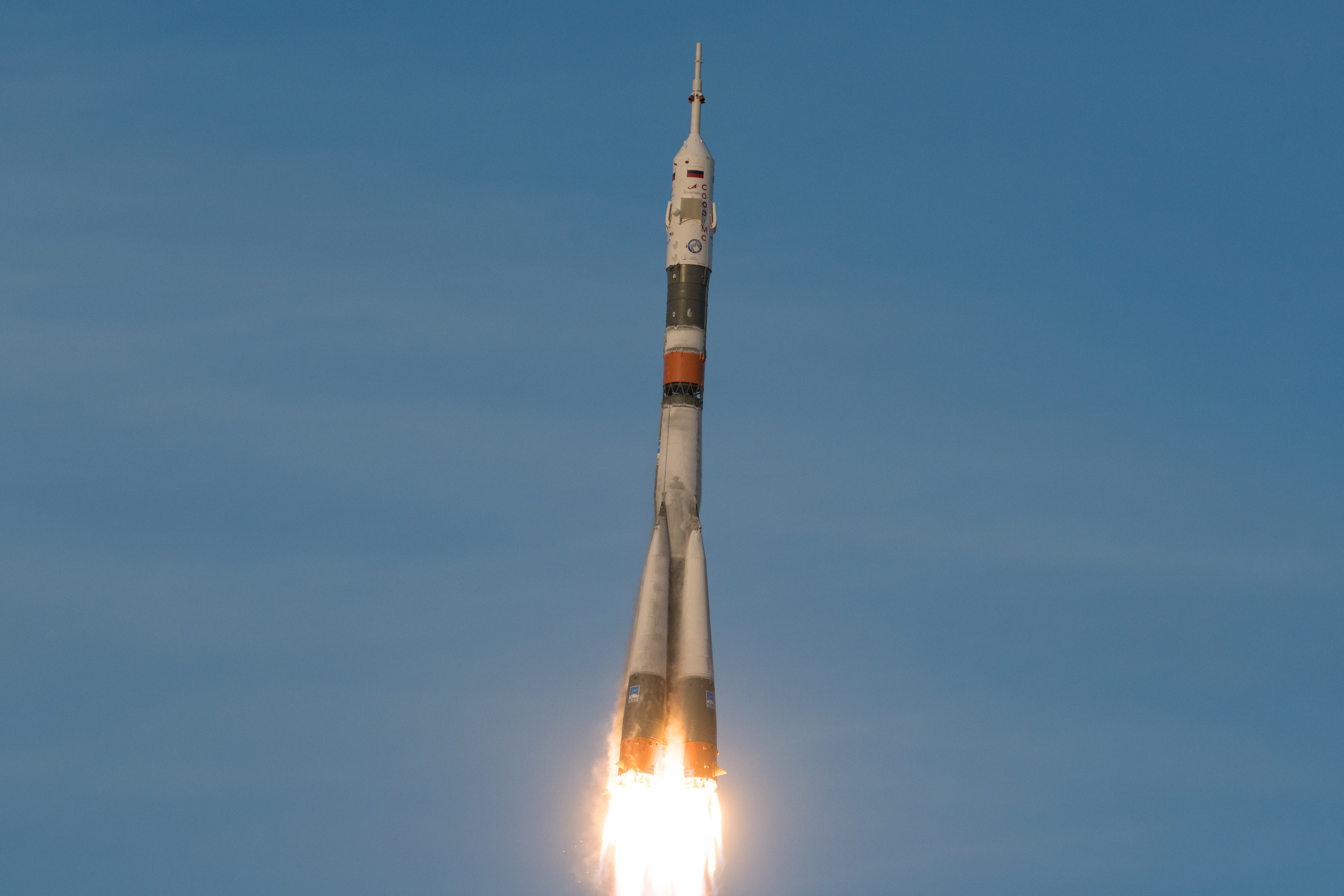
- The launch of Soyuz MS-11
- Operator: Roscosmos
- COSPAR ID: 2018-098A
- SATCAT no.: 43756
- Mission duration: 203d 15h 15m 58s
- Distance travelled: 86,430,555 statue miles
- Orbits completed: 3264

Spacecraft properties
- Spacecraft type: Soyuz-MS 11F747 No. 741
- Manufacturer: Energia

Crew
- Crew size: 3
- Members: Oleg Kononenko; Anne McClain; David Saint-Jacques
- Callsign: Antares

Start of mission
- Launch date: 3 December 2018, 11:31 UTC
- Rocket: Soyuz-FG
- Launch site: Baikonur, Site 1/5
- Contractor: RKTs Progress

End of mission
- Landing date: 25 June 2019, 02:47:50 UTC
- Landing site: 148 km SE of Dzheskasgan

Orbital parameters
- Reference system: Geocentric
- Regime: Low Earth
- Inclination: 51.6º

Docking with ISS
- Docking port: Poisk zenith
- Docking date: 3 December 2018, 17:33 UTC
- Undocking date: 24 June 2019, 23:25:30 UTC
- Time docked: 203d 5h 52m
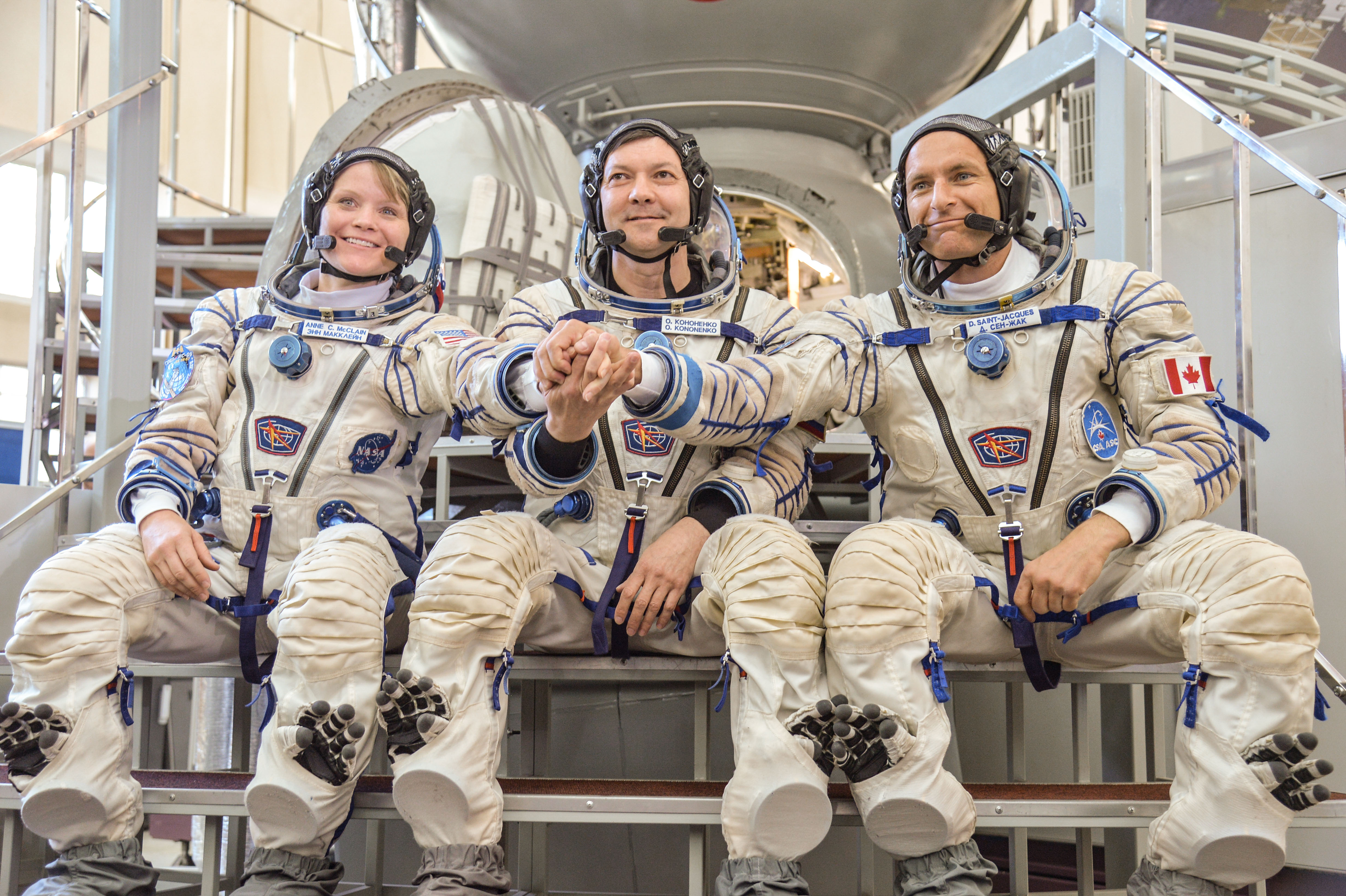
- Mission insignia (l-r) McClain, Kononenko and Saint-Jacques Soyuz programme (crewed)

Soyuz MS-11 was a Soyuz spaceflight that launched on 3 December 2018, marking the 100th orbital launch of the year. Originally scheduled for 20 December, the launch date was advanced to 3 December following the failure of Soyuz MS-10. MS-11 was the 140th flight of a Soyuz spacecraft and carried the three members of the Expedition 58 crew to the International Space Station. The crew consisted of a Russian commander, an American flight engineer, and a Canadian flight engineer.

== Crew ==
Prime crew
Position	Crew
Commander	(Russia) Oleg Kononenko, Roscosmos; Expedition 58; Fourth spaceflight
Flight engineer	(Canada) David Saint-Jacques, CSA; Expedition 58; First spaceflight
Flight engineer	(United States) Anne McClain, NASA; Expedition 58; First spaceflight

Backup crew
Position	Crew
Commander	(Russia) Aleksandr Skvortsov, Roscosmos
Flight engineer	(Italy) Luca Parmitano, ESA
Flight engineer	(United States) Andrew R. Morgan, NASA
