= Progress MS-24 =

2023 Russian resupply spaceflight to the ISS

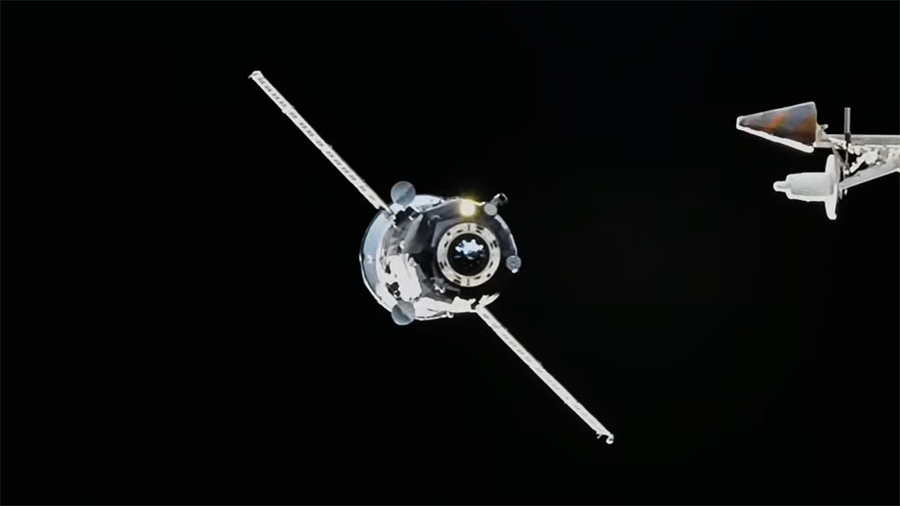
- Progress MS-24 approaching the ISS
- Names: Progress 85P
- Mission type: ISS resupply
- Operator: Roscosmos
- COSPAR ID: 2023-125A
- SATCAT no.: 57691
- Mission duration: 174 days, 4 hours and 8 minutes

Spacecraft properties
- Spacecraft: Progress MS-24 no.454
- Spacecraft type: Progress MS
- Manufacturer: Energia
- Launch mass: 7000 kg

Start of mission
- Launch date: 23 August 2023, 01:08 UTC
- Rocket: Soyuz-2.1a
- Launch site: Baikonur, Site 31/6
- Contractor: RKTs Progress

End of mission
- Disposal: Deorbited
- Decay date: 13 February 2024, 05:16 UTC

Orbital parameters
- Reference system: Geocentric orbit
- Regime: Low Earth orbit
- Inclination: 51.65°

Docking with ISS
- Docking port: Zvezda aft
- Docking date: 25 August 2023, 03:45 UTC
- Undocking date: 13 February 2024, 02:09 UTC
- Time docked: 171 days, 22 hours and 24 minutes

Progress MS-24 (Russian: Прогресс МC-24), Russian production No.454, identified by NASA as Progress 85P, is a Progress spaceflight launched by Roscosmos to resupply the International Space Station (ISS). It is the 177th flight of a Progress spacecraft.

== Launch ==
A Soyuz-2.1a launched Progress MS-24 to the International Space Station from Baikonur Site 31 on 23 August 2023. Around 2 days after the launch, Progress MS-24 automatically docked with Zvezda and continues its mission, supporting Expedition 70 aboard the ISS.

== Cargo ==
The MS-24 cargo capacity is 2,500 kg (5,500 lb) as follows:

- Dry cargo: 1,535 kg (3,384 lb)
- Fuel: 500 kg (1,100 lb)
- Nitrogen: 40 kg (88 lb)
- Water: 420 kg (930 lb)

== See also ==
- Uncrewed spaceflights to the International Space Station
