= Expedition 72 =

Long-duration mission to the International Space Station

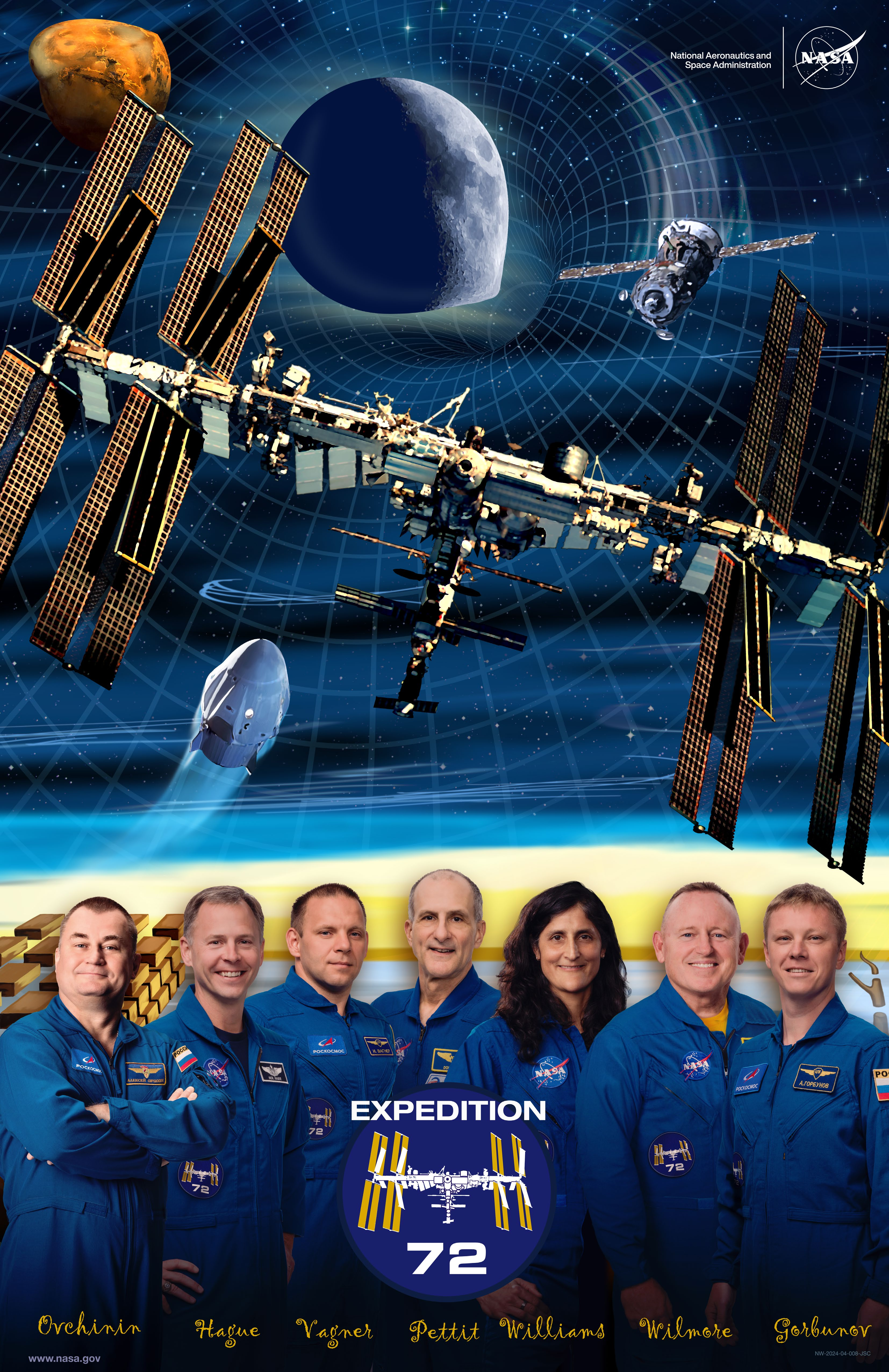
- Promotional Poster
- Mission type: Long-duration expedition
- Operator: NASA / Roscosmos
- Mission duration: 208 days, 13 hours and 21 minutes

Expedition
- Space station: International Space Station
- Began: 23 September 2024
- Ended: 19 April 2025
- Arrived aboard: SpaceX Crew-8; Boeing Crew Flight Test; Soyuz MS-26; SpaceX Crew-9; SpaceX Crew-10; Soyuz MS-27
- Departed aboard: SpaceX Crew-8; SpaceX Crew-9; Soyuz MS-26

Crew
- Crew size: 7–11
- Members: Expedition 70/71/72: Matthew Dominick; Michael Barratt; Jeanette Epps; Alexander Grebenkin; Expedition 71/72: Barry E. Wilmore; Sunita Williams; Aleksey Ovchinin; Ivan Vagner; Donald Pettit; Expedition 72: Nick Hague; Aleksandr Gorbunov; Expedition 72/73: Anne McClain; Nichole Ayers; Takuya Onishi; Kirill Peskov; Sergey Ryzhikov; Alexey Zubritsky; Jonny Kim
- EVAs: 3
- EVA duration: 18 hours, 43 minutes
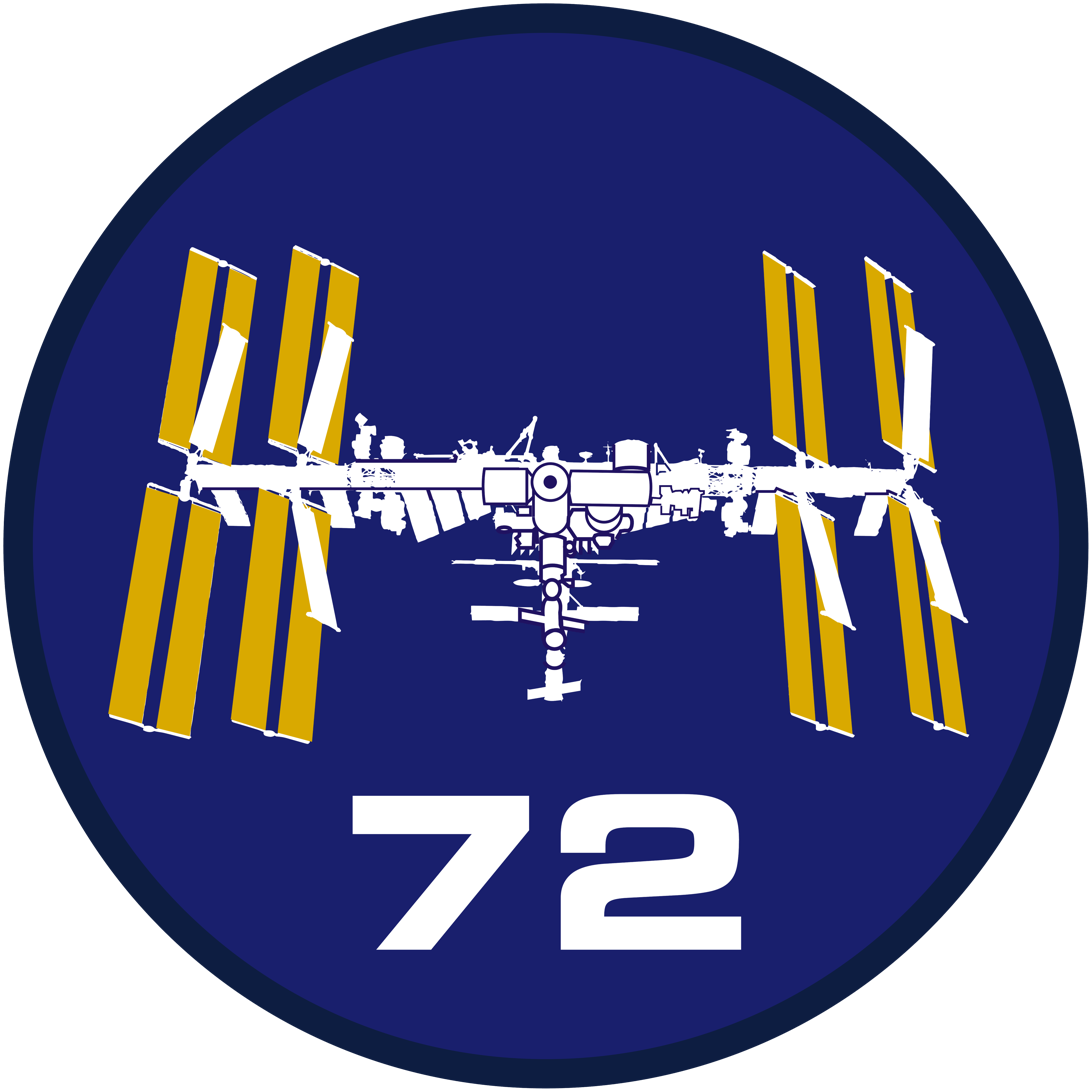
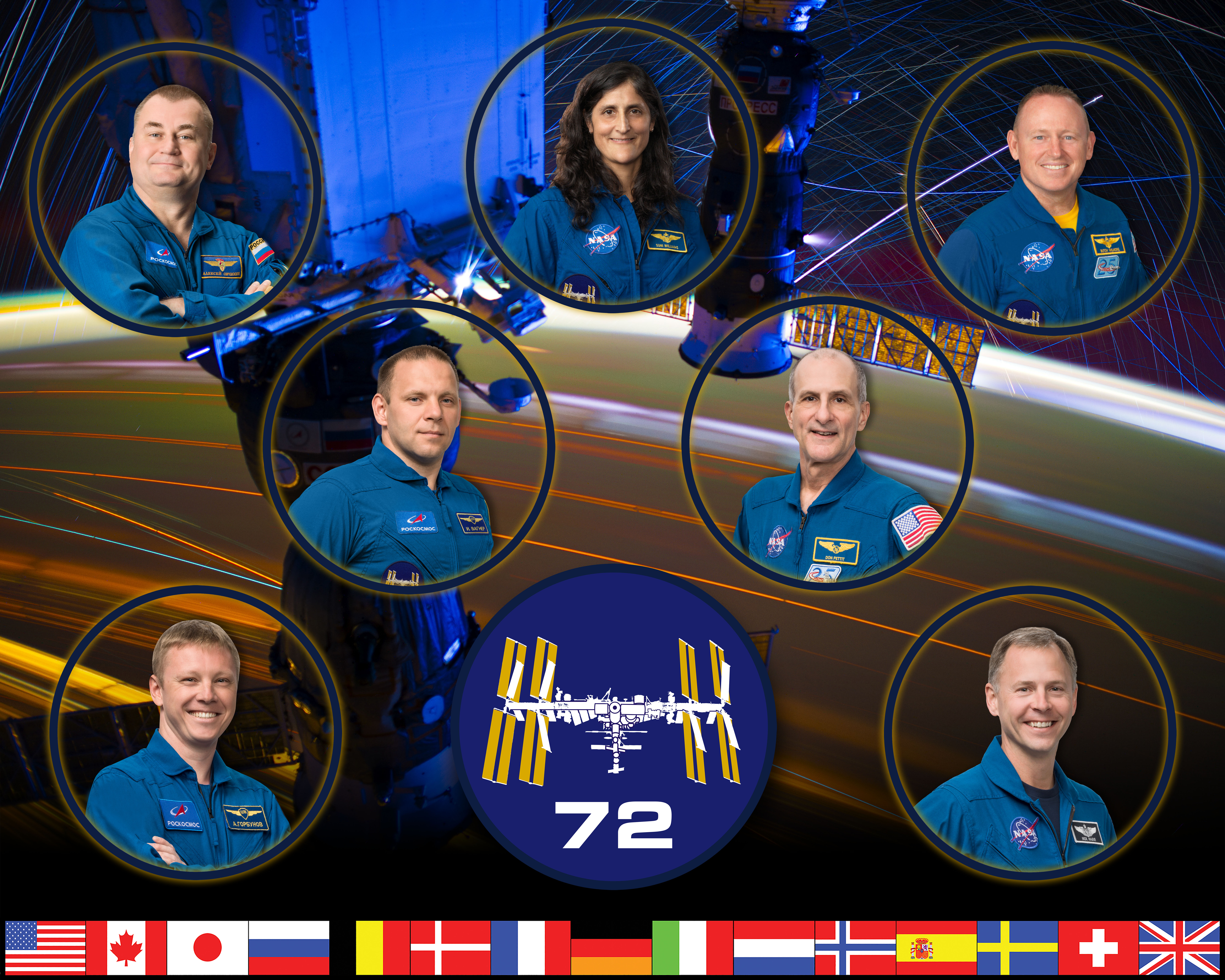
- Expedition 72 mission patch Left to right, top row: Ovchinin, Williams, Wilmore; Middle row: Vagner, Pettit; Bottom row: Gorbunov, Hague Expeditions

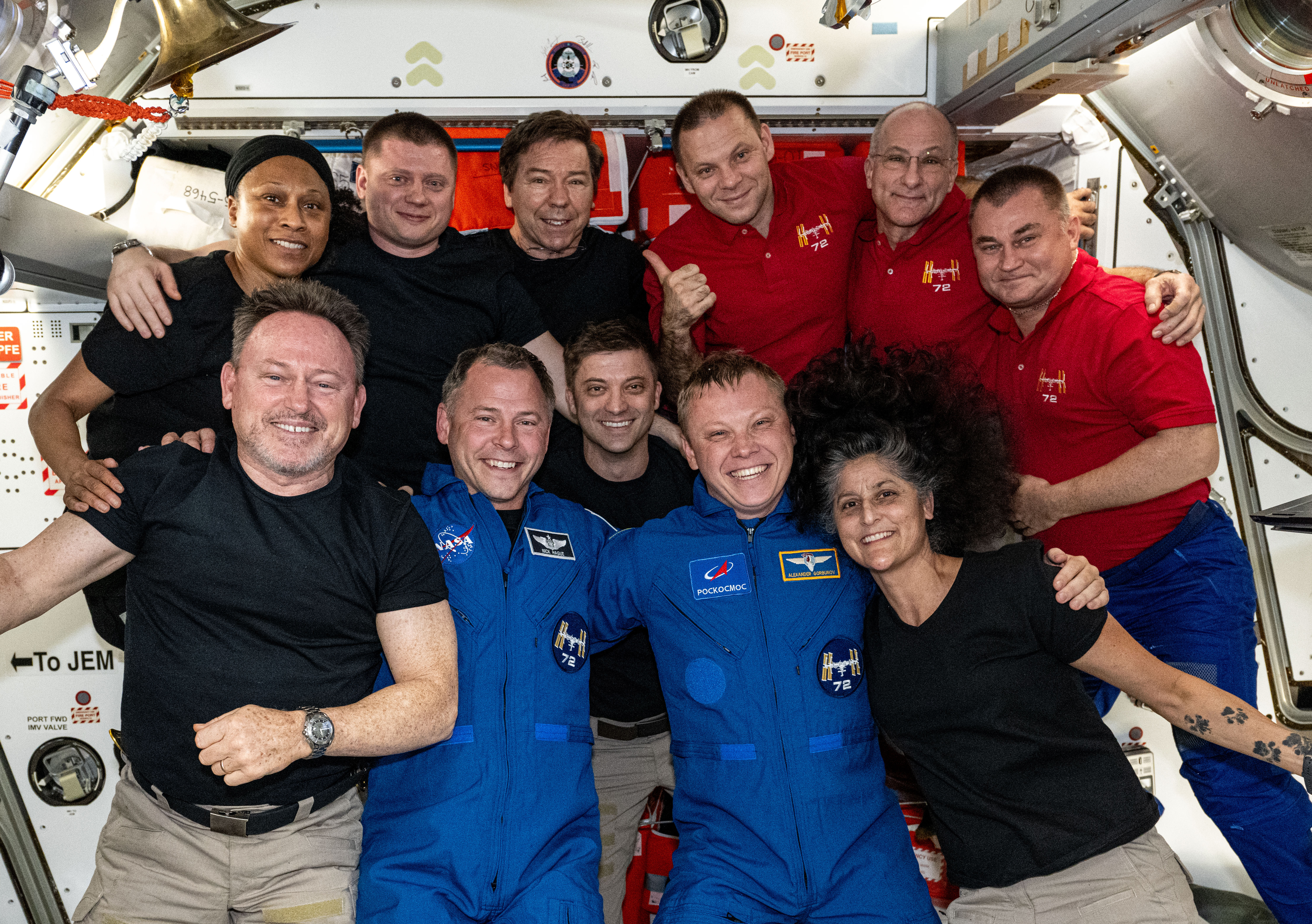
Expedition 72 crew

Expedition 72 was the 72nd long-duration expedition to the International Space Station (ISS). The expedition began with the departure of Soyuz MS-25 on 23 September 2024 with NASA astronaut Sunita Williams taking over the ISS command and concluded with the departure of Soyuz MS-26. It continued the extensive scientific research conducted aboard the ISS, focusing on biology, human physiology, physics, and materials science. The crew members also maintained and upgraded the space station systems.

== Background, Crew, and Events ==
The expedition consisted of Roscosmos cosmonauts Aleksey Ovchinin, Ivan Vagner, and Aleksandr Gorbunov, and NASA astronauts Barry E. Wilmore, Sunita Williams, Donald Pettit, and Nick Hague.

Wilmore and Williams arrived at the station on 6 June 2024 for what was expected to be a brief visit as part of the Boeing Crew Flight Test mission. However, their spacecraft experienced technical issues and returned to Earth uncrewed, and Wilmore and Williams were added to the Expedition 71/72 crew.

Ovchinin, Vagner, and Pettit arrived at the station on 11 September aboard Soyuz MS-26.

Hague and Gorbunov arrived to the station on 29 September aboard SpaceX Crew-9. The handover between Crew-9 and Crew-8 was far longer than normal. Additional time was needed to reconfigure Crew-8's Dragon capsule to remove the temporary seat structures that were added in case Wilmore and Williams needed to evacuate. The departure was further delayed due to poor weather conditions in the splashdown zones surrounding Florida caused by Hurricane Milton and several other storms. The cumulative delays caused Crew-8 to become the longest Dragon mission when it departed with NASA astronauts Matthew Dominick, Michael Barratt, and Jeanette Epps, as well as Roscosmos cosmonaut Alexander Grebenkin on 23 October.

The expedition saw three spacewalks. On 19 December 2024, Ovchinin and Vagner conducted a 7-hour, 17-minute EVA to work on externally mounted science systems. On 16 January 2025, Hague and Williams completed a 6-hour EVA focused on maintenance and upgrades. This was the first full-length EVA by U.S. astronauts in over a year, following a June 2024 incident in which a leak in an EMU cut a spacewalk short. The final EVA took place on 30 January with Williams and Wilmore removing a radio frequency group antenna assembly during a 5-hour, 26-minute spacewalk. During this EVA, Williams set a new record for total spacewalking time by a female astronaut.

Williams handed over command of the space station to Ovchinin on 7 March to prepare for her departure. SpaceX Crew-10 arrived at the ISS on 16 March, transporting NASA astronauts Anne McClain and Nichole Ayers, JAXA astronaut Takuya Onishi, and Roscosmos cosmonaut Kirill Peskov, and featured a shorter than normal handover with Crew-9 of just two days. It was shortened due to a delay in an upcoming supply flight, which necessitated conserving resources like food and a brief window of favorable weather in the Gulf of Mexico for splashdown. Crew-9 departed with Hague, Gorbunov, Wilmore, and Williams on 18 March.

Roscosmos cosmonauts Sergey Ryzhikov and Alexey Zubritsky, along with NASA astronaut Jonny Kim arrived at the station aboard Soyuz MS-27 on 8 April. After a handover period, Ovchinin handed over command of the space station to Onishi on 18 April. The expedition came to a close on 19 April with the departure of Ovchinin, Vagner, and Pettit on Soyuz MS-26.

== Events manifest ==
Events involving crewed spacecraft are listed in bold.

Previous mission: Expedition 71

- 23 September 2024 - **Soyuz MS-25 undocking, official switch from Expedition 71**
- 29 September 2024 - **SpaceX Crew-9 docking**
- 23 October 2024 - **SpaceX Crew-8 undocking**
- 3 November 2024 - **SpaceX Crew-9 redocking**
- 5 November 2024 - CRS SpX-31 docking
- 19 November 2024 - Progress MS-27 undocking
- 23 November 2024 - Progress MS-29 docking
- 16 December 2024 - CRS SpX-31 undocking
- 19 December 2024 - EVA 1 (VKD-63) Ovchinin/Vagner: 7 hrs, 17 mins
- 16 January 2025 - EVA 2 (US-91) Hague/Williams: 6 hrs
- 30 January 2025 - EVA 3 (US-92) Williams/Wilmore: 5 hrs, 26 mins
- 25 February 2025 - Progress MS-28 undocking
- 1 March 2025 - Progress MS-30 docking
- 7 March 2025 - ISS Expedition 72 change of command from Sunita Williams to Aleksey Ovchinin
- 16 March 2025 - **SpaceX Crew-10 docking**
- 18 March 2025 - **SpaceX Crew-9 undocking**
- 28 March 2025 - CRS NG-21 unberthing and release
- 8 April 2025 - **Soyuz MS-27 docking**
- 18 April 2025 - ISS Expedition 72/73 change of command from Aleksey Ovchinin to Takuya Onishi
- 19 April 2025 - **Soyuz MS-26 undocking, official switch to Expedition 73**

Next mission: Expedition 73

== Crew ==
Flight	Astronaut	Increment 72a	Increment 72b	Increment 72c	Increment 72d	Increment 72e	Increment 72f	Increment 72g
Flight	Astronaut	23-29 Sep 2024	29 Sep-23 Oct 2024	23 Oct 2024-7 Mar 2025	7-16 Mar 2025	16-18 Mar 2025	18 Mar-8 Apr 2025	8-19 Apr 2025
Soyuz MS-26	Aleksey Ovchinin, Roscosmos; Third (Note: Not counting the aborted flight of Soyuz MS-10.) spaceflight	Flight engineer			Commander			
Soyuz MS-26	Ivan Vagner, Roscosmos; Second spaceflight	Flight engineer						
Soyuz MS-26	Donald Pettit, NASA; Fourth spaceflight	Flight engineer						
SpaceX Crew-8	Matthew Dominick, NASA; First spaceflight	Flight engineer		Off station				
SpaceX Crew-8	Michael Barratt, NASA; Third spaceflight	Flight engineer		Off station				
SpaceX Crew-8	Jeanette Epps, NASA; Only spaceflight	Flight engineer		Off station				
SpaceX Crew-8	Alexander Grebenkin, Roscosmos; First spaceflight	Flight engineer		Off station				
SpaceX Crew-9	Barry E. Wilmore, NASA; Third and last spaceflight	Flight engineer					Off station	
SpaceX Crew-9	Sunita Williams, NASA; Third and last spaceflight	Commander			Flight engineer		Off station	
SpaceX Crew-9	Nick Hague, NASA; Second and last spaceflight	Off station	Flight engineer				Off station	
SpaceX Crew-9	Aleksandr Gorbunov, Roscosmos; First spaceflight	Off station	Flight engineer				Off station	
SpaceX Crew-10	Anne McClain, NASA; Second spaceflight	Off station				Flight engineer		
SpaceX Crew-10	Nichole Ayers, NASA; First spaceflight	Off station				Flight engineer		
SpaceX Crew-10	Takuya Onishi, JAXA; Second spaceflight	Off station				Flight engineer		
SpaceX Crew-10	Kirill Peskov, Roscosmos; First spaceflight	Off station				Flight engineer		
Soyuz MS-27	Sergey Ryzhikov, Roscosmos; Third spaceflight	Off station						Flight engineer
Soyuz MS-27	Alexey Zubritsky, Roscosmos; First spaceflight	Off station						Flight engineer
Soyuz MS-27	Jonny Kim, NASA; Only spaceflight	Off station						Flight engineer

== Vehicle manifest ==
Vehicle	Purpose	Port	Docking date	Undocking date
Vehicles inherited from Expedition 70 or Expedition 71
SpaceX Crew-8 "Endeavour"	Exp. 70/71/72 crew	Harmony forward	5 Mar 2024 (Exp. 70)	2 May 2024 (Exp. 71; redock)
SpaceX Crew-8 "Endeavour"	Exp. 70/71/72 crew	Harmony zenith	2 May 2024 (Exp. 71; redock)	23 Oct 2024
Progress MS-27	Cargo	Poisk zenith	1 Jun 2024 (Exp. 71)	19 Nov 2024
CRS NG-21	Cargo	Unity nadir	6 Aug 2024 (Exp. 71)	28 Mar 2025
Progress MS-28	Cargo	Zvezda aft	17 Aug 2024 (Exp. 71)	25 Feb 2025
Soyuz MS-26 "Burlak"	Exp. 71/72 crew	Rassvet nadir	11 Sep 2024 (Exp. 71)	19 Apr 2025
Vehicles docked during Expedition 72
SpaceX Crew-9 "Freedom"	Exp. 72 crew	Harmony forward	29 Sep 2024	3 Nov 2024 (redock)
SpaceX Crew-9 "Freedom"	Exp. 72 crew	Harmony zenith	3 Nov 2024 (redock)	18 Mar 2025
CRS SpX-31	Cargo	Harmony forward	5 Nov 2024	16 Dec 2024
Progress MS-29	Cargo	Poisk zenith	23 Nov 2024	1 Jul 2025 (Exp. 73)
Progress MS-30	Cargo	Zvezda aft	1 Mar 2025	9 Sep 2025 (Exp. 73)
SpaceX Crew-10 "Endurance"	Exp. 72/73 crew	Harmony forward	16 Mar 2025	7 Aug 2025 (Exp. 73)
Soyuz MS-27 "Favor"	Exp. 72/73 crew	Prichal nadir	8 Apr 2025	9 Dec 2025 (Exp. 73)

Segment	U.S. Orbital Segment				Russian Orbital Segment			
Period	Harmony forward	Harmony zenith	Harmony nadir	Unity nadir	Rassvet nadir	Prichal nadir	Poisk zenith	Zvezda aft
23–29 Sep 2024	Vacant	SpaceX Crew-8	Vacant	CRS NG-21	Soyuz MS-26	Vacant	Progress MS-27	Progress MS-28
29 Sep–23 Oct 2024	SpaceX Crew-9	SpaceX Crew-8	Vacant	CRS NG-21	Soyuz MS-26	Vacant	Progress MS-27	Progress MS-28
23 Oct–3 Nov 2024	SpaceX Crew-9	Vacant	Vacant	CRS NG-21	Soyuz MS-26	Vacant	Progress MS-27	Progress MS-28
3–5 Nov 2024	Vacant	SpaceX Crew-9	Vacant	CRS NG-21	Soyuz MS-26	Vacant	Progress MS-27	Progress MS-28
5–19 Nov 2024	CRS SpX-31	SpaceX Crew-9	Vacant	CRS NG-21	Soyuz MS-26	Vacant	Progress MS-27	Progress MS-28
19–23 Nov 2024	CRS SpX-31	SpaceX Crew-9	Vacant	CRS NG-21	Soyuz MS-26	Vacant	Vacant	Progress MS-28
23 Nov–16 Dec 2024	CRS SpX-31	SpaceX Crew-9	Vacant	CRS NG-21	Soyuz MS-26	Vacant	Progress MS-29	Progress MS-28
16 Dec 2024–25 Feb 2025	Vacant	SpaceX Crew-9	Vacant	CRS NG-21	Soyuz MS-26	Vacant	Progress MS-29	Progress MS-28
25 Feb–1 Mar 2025	Vacant	SpaceX Crew-9	Vacant	CRS NG-21	Soyuz MS-26	Vacant	Progress MS-29	Vacant
1–16 Mar 2025	Vacant	SpaceX Crew-9	Vacant	CRS NG-21	Soyuz MS-26	Vacant	Progress MS-29	Progress MS-30
16–18 Mar 2025	SpaceX Crew-10	SpaceX Crew-9	Vacant	CRS NG-21	Soyuz MS-26	Vacant	Progress MS-29	Progress MS-30
18–28 Mar 2025	SpaceX Crew-10	Vacant	Vacant	CRS NG-21	Soyuz MS-26	Vacant	Progress MS-29	Progress MS-30
28 Mar–8 Apr 2025	SpaceX Crew-10	Vacant	Vacant	Vacant	Soyuz MS-26	Vacant	Progress MS-29	Progress MS-30
8–19 Apr 2025	SpaceX Crew-10	Vacant	Vacant	Vacant	Soyuz MS-26	Soyuz MS-27	Progress MS-29	Progress MS-30

The Prichal aft, forward, starboard, and aft ports all have yet to be used since the module originally docked to the station and are not included in the table.
