= Jeanette Epps =

American aerospace engineer and NASA astronaut (born 1970)

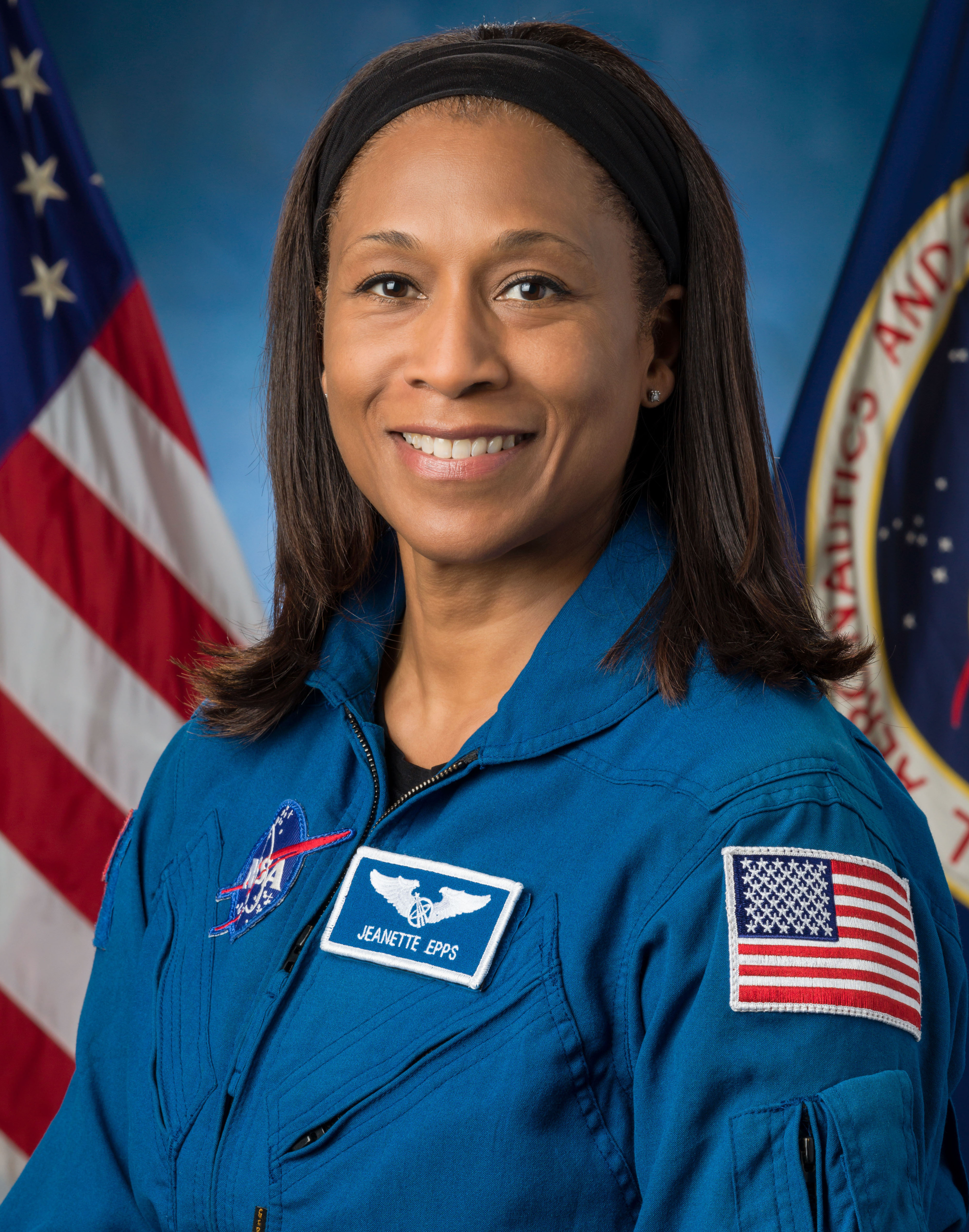
- Official portrait, December 2023
- Born: Jeanette Jo Epps; November 3, 1970 (age 56); Syracuse, New York, U.S.
- Education: Le Moyne College (BS); University of Maryland, College Park (MS, PhD)
- Space career

NASA astronaut
- Time in space: 235 days, 3 hours, 35 minutes
- Selection: NASA Group 20 (2009)
- Missions: SpaceX Crew-8 (Expedition 70/71/72)
- Retired: May 30, 2025
- Scientific career
- Fields: Aerospace engineering
- Thesis: In-Flight Tracking of Helicopter Rotor Blades with Tabs Using Shape Memory Alloy Actuators. (2000)
- Doctoral advisor: Inderjit Chopra

Jeanette Jo Epps (born November 3, 1970) is an American aerospace engineer and retired NASA astronaut. Epps received both her M. S. and Ph.D. degrees in aerospace engineering from the University of Maryland, where she was part of the rotor-craft research group and was a NASA GSRP Fellow. She was chosen for the 20th class of NASA astronauts in 2009, graduating in 2011. She served as a member of the ISS Operations Branch and completed analog astronaut missions, including NEEMO 18 and CAVES 19. She is the second woman and first African-American woman to have participated in CAVES. She was part of the SpaceX Crew-8 mission that spent 235 days in space and 232 days on the ISS from launch on March 4, 2024 to return to Earth on October 25, 2024.

== Early life and education ==
Jeanette Epps was born in Syracuse, New York, one of seven children born to Henry and Luberta (née Jackson) Epps, Mississippians who moved to Syracuse as part of the Great Migration. She and her twin sister Janet excelled in math and science. She graduated from Corcoran High School in Syracuse and earned a B.S. degree in physics from Le Moyne College and an M.S. and a Ph.D. degree in aerospace engineering from the University of Maryland.

== Early research and career ==
While pursuing her M.S. in Aerospace Engineering and Ph.D in Aerospace, Aeronautical and Astronautical/Space Engineering at the University of Maryland, Epps was awarded a NASA GRSP Fellowship and went on to publish many academic works which have been highly cited. Her research was focused in the area of materials engineering, which included comprehensive testing of composite swept-tip beams, comparison of analytical models with experimental results for shape memory alloys, and use of shape memory alloy actuators for tracking helicopter rotor blades in-flight.

After graduating, Epps worked in research at Ford Motor Company, then as a Technical Intelligence Officer with the Central Intelligence Agency. Her work at the Ford Motor Company, resulted in a provisional patent involving the application of magnetostrictive actuators to reduce vibrations in the suspension control arms, and later, a US patent for detection of the location of a frontal collision in an automobile. She worked at the CIA for seven years, including deployments to Iraq. Before becoming an astronaut, her role at the CIA was a Technical Intelligence Officer.

== NASA career ==
In June 2009, Epps was selected as an astronaut candidate for the 20th class of NASA astronauts and later qualified in 2011. Her training included extensive Russian, spacewalk (EVA) and robotics training, along with geology. She has also completed T-38 jet training and has attended the National Outdoor Leadership School (NOLS).

Epps subsequently served as an aquanaut aboard the Aquarius underwater laboratory during the NEEMO 18 undersea exploration mission for nine days starting on July 21, 2014. She has also participated in geologic studies in Hawaii. Epps has worked with the Generic Joint Operation Panel as a representative, which included work on crew efficiency on the ISS. This work resulted in her winning the Johnson Space Center Director's Innovation Group Achievement Award in 2013. She has also worked as CAPCOM for Mission Control, including serving as lead CAPCOM, and currently serves in ISS Operations Branch. Epps has also completed training in winter and water survival in Star City, Russia.

=== ISS Expeditions 56/57 and ESA ===
On January 4, 2017, NASA announced that Epps would be assigned as a flight engineer to the International Space Station (ISS) in mid-2018 for Expeditions 56 and 57, but on January 16, 2018, NASA announced that Epps had been replaced by her backup Serena M. Auñón-Chancellor and would instead be "considered for assignment to future missions". The reason for Epps' removal was not stated, and a NASA spokesperson said, "These decisions are personnel matters for which NASA doesn't provide information." The Washington Post stated that "Last-minute crew changes are not unusual at NASA," although Epps’ brother blamed racism for her removal.

In 2019, Epps completed the ESA CAVES training program simulating the demands of exploring unknown terrains like those of the Moon and Mars. Epps is the second woman and first Black woman to participate in CAVES, following fellow NASA astronaut, Jessica Meir.

Epps also speaks to gatherings and has done so at the University of Maryland multiple times, including at the 2013 winter commencement ceremony for the university's engineering school. She is currently a Member of the Society for Science & the Public, in addition to the AIAA. Epps was a special guest at the 77th World Science Fiction Convention in Dublin, Ireland.

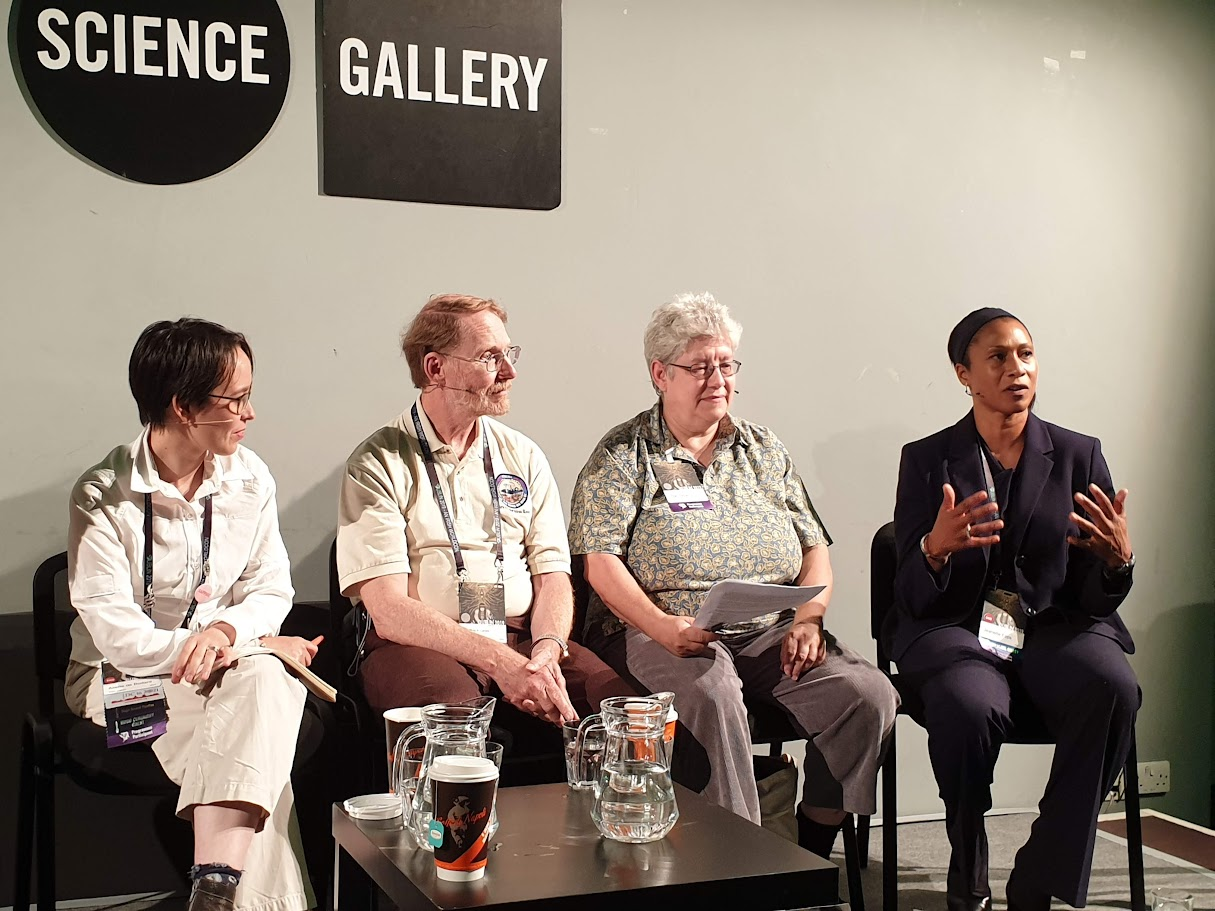
Jeanette Epps (right) speaking on a panel at Dublin 2019, an Irish Worldcon

=== Boeing Starliner-1 ===
On August 25, 2020, NASA announced that Epps would join Starliner-1, the first operational mission of Boeing's Starliner to the ISS, which was delayed from its scheduled launch in the summer of 2021. According to The New York Times, the launch would have made Epps "the first Black woman to be part of an I.S.S. crew," a milestone that was ultimately reached instead by Jessica Watkins in 2022. African-American astronauts were members of Space Shuttle crews to the ISS while the station was being constructed, but until Victor Glover went to the station in Nov 2020, none had made an extended stay as a crew member.

Epps began cross-training on the SpaceX Crew Dragon spacecraft as the Starliner-1 mission kept getting delayed.

=== SpaceX Crew-8 ===
In August 2023, NASA announced that Epps would fly as a mission specialist on SpaceX Crew-8, a half-year mission to the ISS that launched on March 4, 2024 onboard the Crew Dragon Endeavour. The mission made her the second African-American woman to be part of a long-duration mission onboard the ISS. The mission spent extra time in space because of a month-long delay in launching SpaceX Crew-9. They then spent a few extra weeks removing seating and other equipment in Endeavour that was needed for Boeing Crew Flight Test mission astronauts Sunita Williams and Butch Wilmore. Weather in the landing zones then caused further delays, but Epps and her crewmates finally splashed down off of the coast of Pensacola, Florida on October 25, 2024. The mission’s 236 days in low-Earth orbit set the single-mission record for the longest time an American crewed spacecraft spent in space.

=== Retirement ===
In June 2025, NASA announced that Epps retired after working 16 years with the agency.

== Awards and honors ==
- 1996, 1997, 1998, 1999 NASA GSRP Fellowship
- 2003, 2004, 2008 Exceptional Performance Award
- 2012 Academy of Distinguished Alumni, University of Maryland
- 2013 Johnson Space Center Director's Innovation Group Achievement Award
- 2014 Glenn L. Martin Medal, A. James Clark School of Engineering, University of Maryland
- 2018 Honorary Member, Alpha Kappa Alpha

=== Honorary doctorates ===
- 2016 Doctorate of Humane Letters, Le Moyne College, New York

== Selected publications ==
Epps has authored several highly referenced works, including conference and journal papers from her graduate research, along with a patent from her work at the Ford Motor Company.

- Epps, J. and Chopra, I., "Methodology for In-flight Tracking of Helicopter Rotor Blades Using Shape Memory Alloy Actuators, Journal of the American Helicopter Society, Vol. 49, No. 2, April 2004, pp. 192-200.
- Epps, J. J., and Chandra, R., "Shape Memory Alloy Actuation for Active Tuning of Composite Beams," Smart Materials and Structures Journal, 6 (1997), p. 251-256.
- Epps, J. J., and Chandra, R., "The Natural Frequencies of Rotating Composite Beams with Tip Sweep," Journal of the American Helicopter Society, Vol. 41, No. 1, January 1996, pp. 29–36.

== See also ==
- List of astronauts by name
- List of astronauts by year of selection
- List of African-American astronauts
- List of female astronauts
