= Matthew Dominick =

American test pilot and astronaut

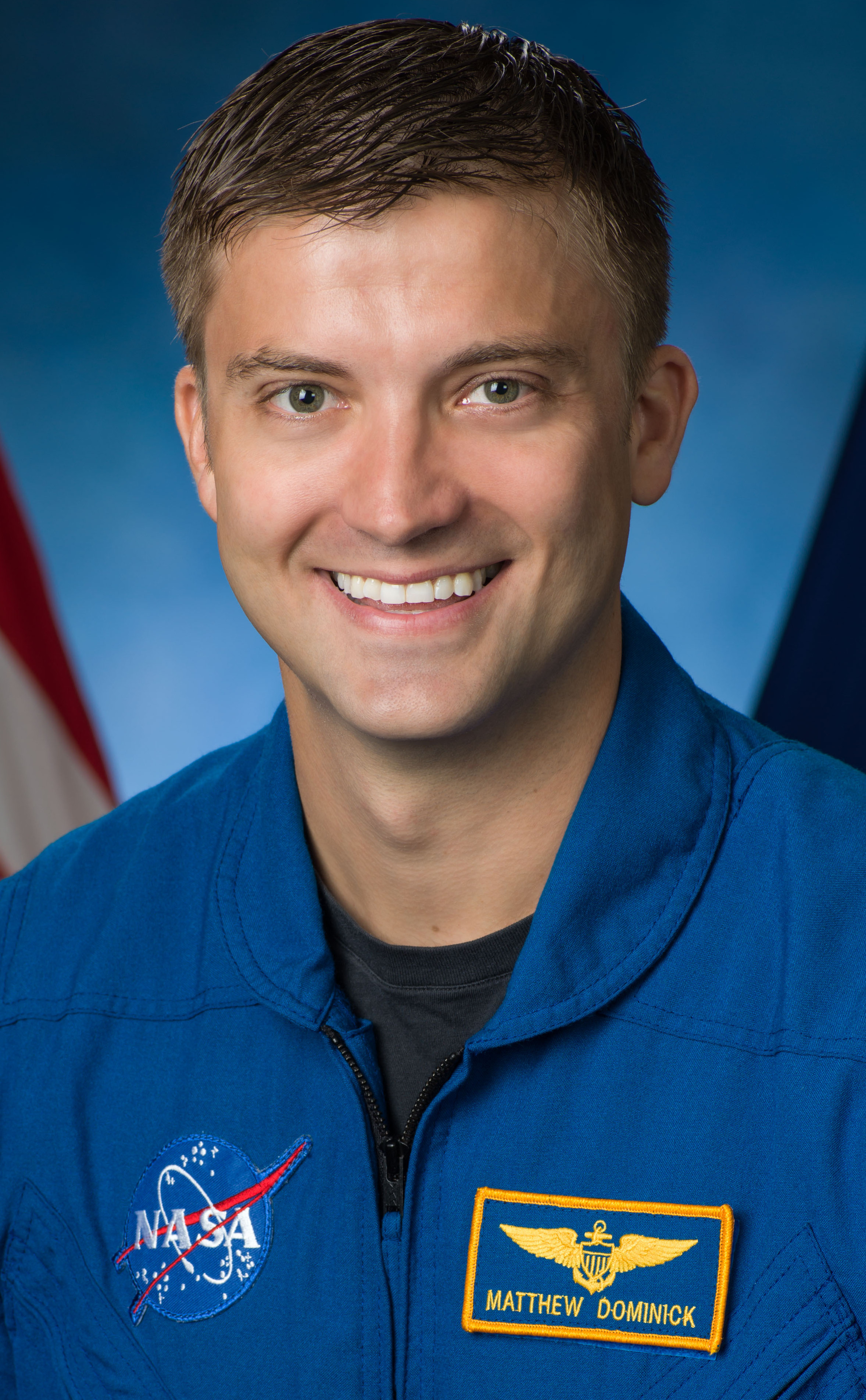
- NASA portrait, 2017
- Born: Matthew Stuart Dominick; December 7, 1981 (age 44); Wheat Ridge, Colorado, U.S.
- Education: University of San Diego (BS); Naval Postgraduate School (MS)
- Space career

NASA astronaut
- Rank: Commander, US Navy
- Time in space: 235 days, 3 hours, 35 minutes
- Selection: NASA Group 22 (2017)
- Missions: SpaceX Crew-8 (Expedition 70/71/72)

Matthew Stuart Dominick (born December 7, 1981) is an American test pilot and NASA astronaut. As a pilot in the United States Navy (USN), he has more than 1,600 hours of flight time in 28 aircraft, 400 carrier-arrested landings, 61 combat missions, and almost 200 flight test carrier landings. He was on the International Space Station aboard the SpaceX Crew-8 mission from March to October 2024.

== Early life and education ==
Dominick was born on December 7, 1981, in Wheat Ridge, Colorado. After attending D'Evelyn Junior/Senior High School in Littleton, Colorado, he graduated from the University of San Diego in 2005 with a Bachelor of Science in electrical engineering with minors in physics and mathematics. As a student, he was a member of the Navy ROTC and the Sigma Phi Epsilon fraternity.

== Military career ==
After graduating from the University of San Diego, Dominick was commissioned as an ensign in the USN. He attended Primary Flight Training at NAS Pensacola and was designated a Naval Aviator in 2007. He completed F/A-18 Super Hornet training with VFA-106 at NAS Oceana, before being assigned to VFA-143. With VFA-143, Dominick completed two deployments in support of Operation Enduring Freedom before being selected to attend the United States Naval Test Pilot School (USNTPS) / Naval Postgraduate School (NPS) co-operative program, allowing him to earn a Master of Science in Systems Engineering from the NPS and attend the USNTPS.

Following graduation from USNTPS, Dominick was designated a test pilot and was assigned to VX-23, based out of NAS Patuxent River, Maryland. There, he served as a developmental flight test project officer on numerous programs, including MAGIC CARPET, Joint Precision Approach & Landing Systems and Infrared Search and Track Pod. Dominick also contributed to the development of the X-47B, V-22 Osprey, E-2C Hawkeye, and F-35C Lightning II. At the time of his selection as an astronaut, Dominick was serving as Department Head with VFA-115, based out of Atsugi, Japan.

His promotion to Navy commander was approved on June 27, 2019 and made effective on September 1, 2020.

== NASA career ==
In June 2017, Dominick was selected as a member of NASA Astronaut Group 22 and began his two-year training. At the time of his selection, he was at sea on the USS Ronald Reagan. He was the commander of the SpaceX Crew-8 mission to the ISS.

== Personal life ==
Dominick and his wife, Faith, have two daughters.

Photography is one of his hobbies. During his time on the ISS, his images of weather phenomena, storms, spacecraft, and his creative ways of capturing everyday life on the station garnered media attention.

== Awards and honors ==
Dominick was the 2015 Naval Test Wing Atlantic Test Pilot of the Year and a Member of the 2015 Department of the Navy Test Team of the Year. He has received three Strike/Flight Air Medals, Navy and Marine Corps Commendation Medal, and three Navy and Marine Corps Achievement Medals. He is a member of the Society of Experimental Test Pilots, Society of Flight Test Engineers, and the Tailhook Association.
