= Expedition 71 =

Long-duration mission to the International Space Station

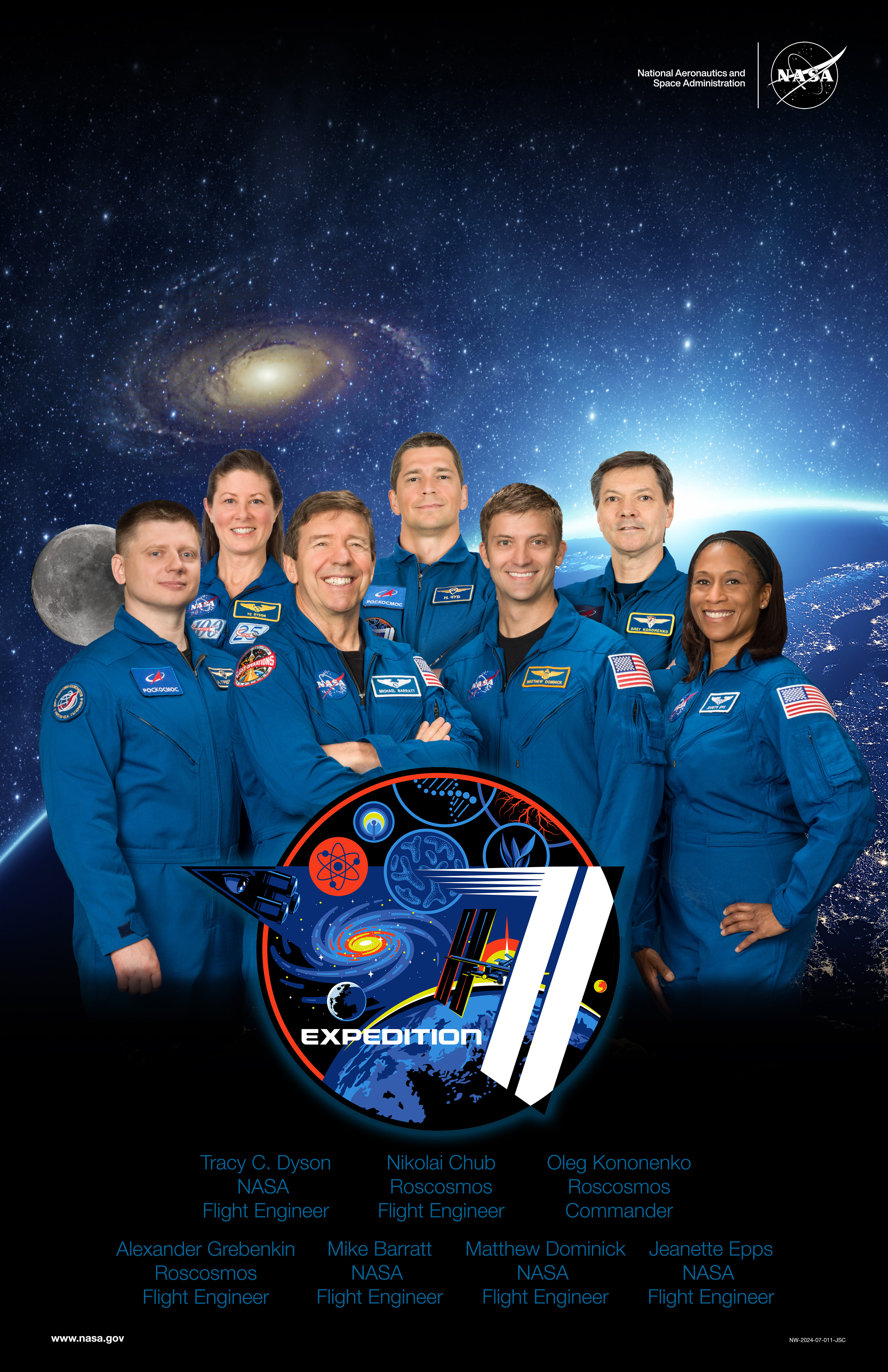
- Promotional Poster (without CFT crew)
- Mission type: Long-duration expedition
- Operator: NASA / Roscosmos
- Mission duration: 170 days, 1 hour and 21 minutes

Expedition
- Space station: International Space Station
- Began: 6 April 2024
- Ended: 23 September 2024
- Arrived aboard: Soyuz MS-24; SpaceX Crew-8; Soyuz MS-25; Boeing Crew Flight Test; Soyuz MS-26
- Departed aboard: Soyuz MS-25

Crew
- Crew size: 7–12
- Members: Expedition 69/70/71: Oleg Kononenko; Nikolai Chub; Expedition 70/71/72: Matthew Dominick; Michael Barratt; Jeanette Epps; Alexander Grebenkin; Expedition 70/71: Tracy Caldwell-Dyson; Expedition 71/72: Barry E. Wilmore; Sunita Williams; Aleksey Ovchinin; Ivan Vagner; Donald Pettit
- EVAs: 2
- EVA duration: 5 hours and 7 minutes
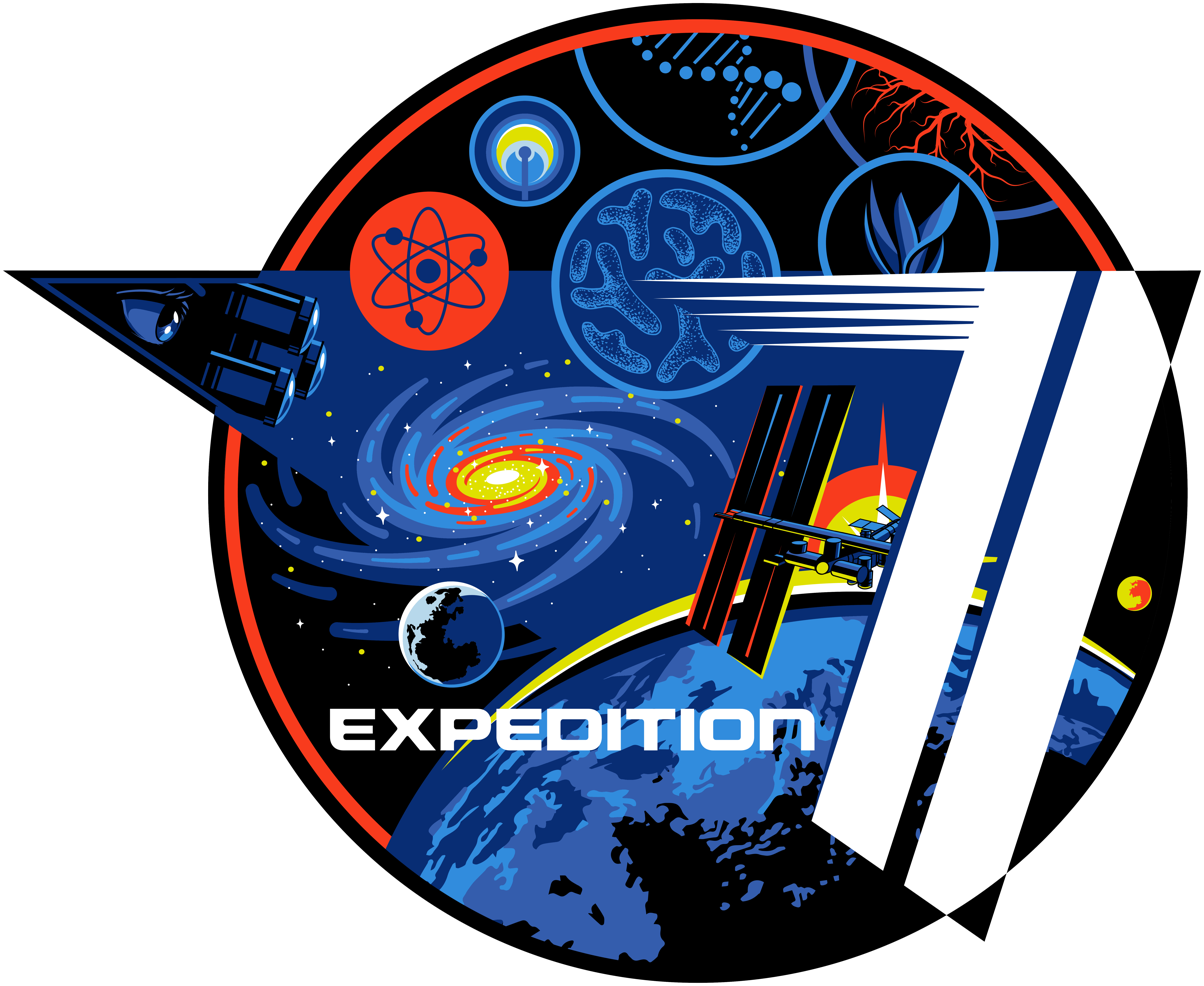
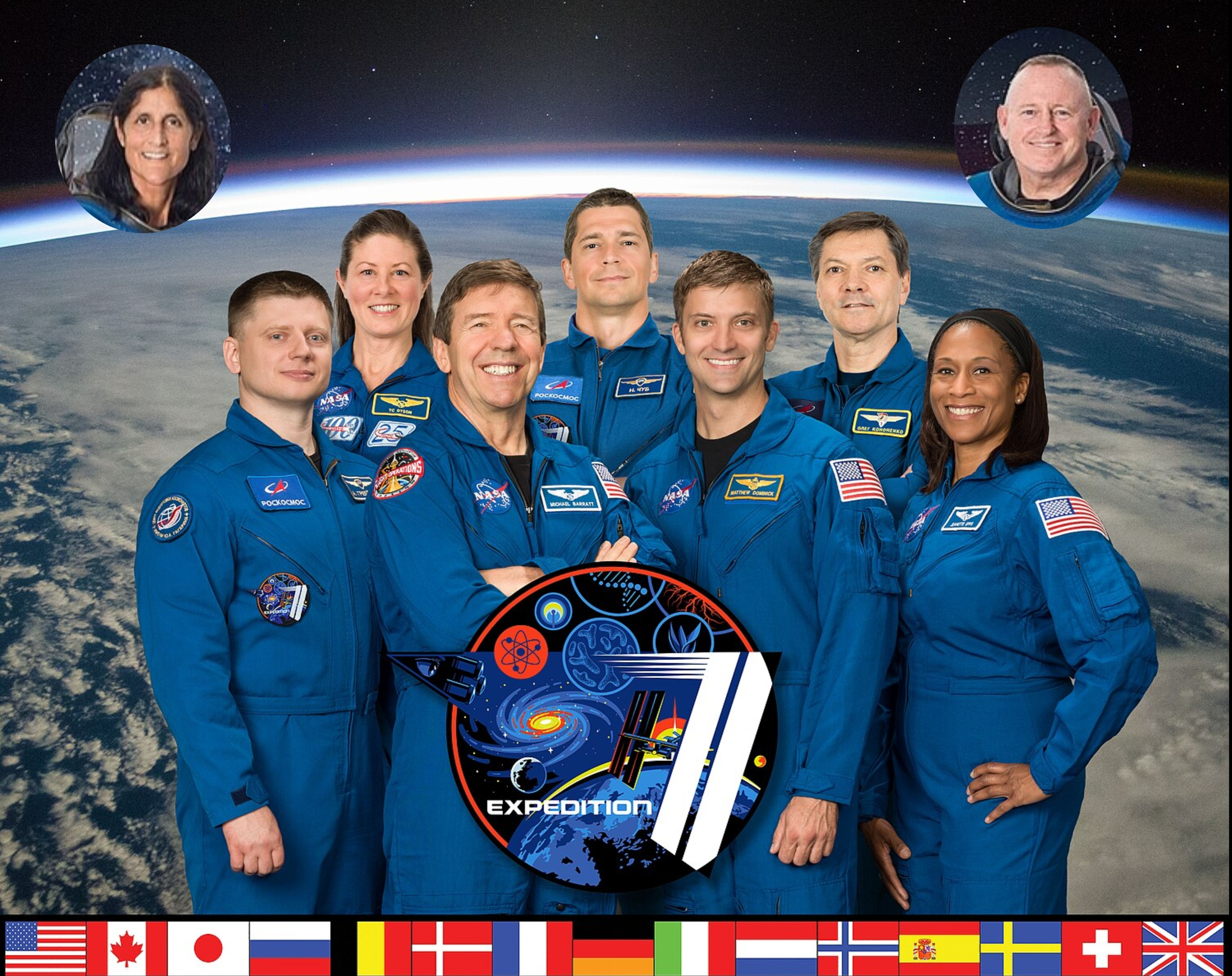
- Expedition 71 mission patch From left: Grebenkin, Caldwell-Dyson, Barratt, Chub, Dominick, Kononenko, and Epps with Williams (top left) and Wilmore (top right) Expeditions

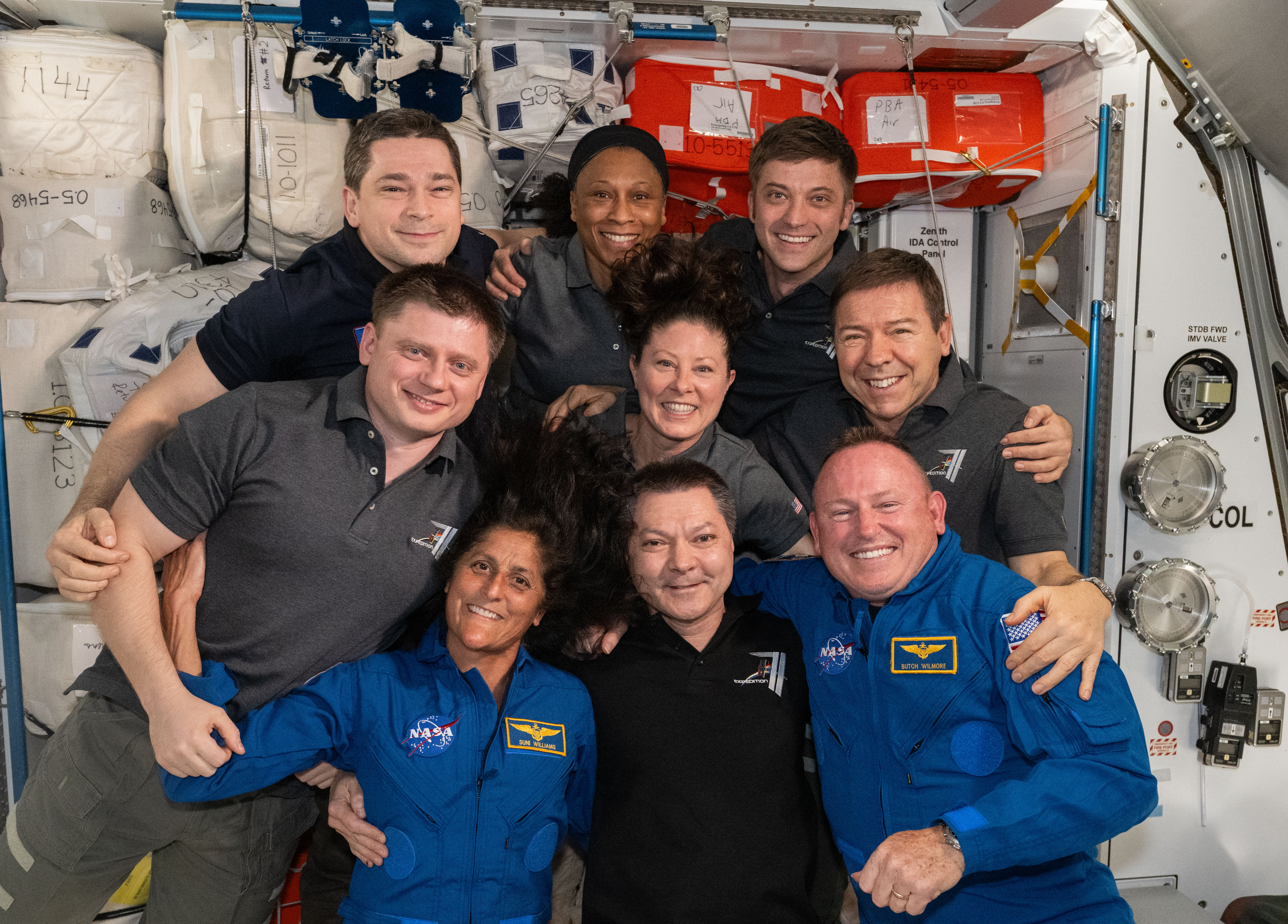
Expedition 71 crew

Expedition 71 was the 71st long-duration expedition to the International Space Station. The expedition began with the departure of Soyuz MS-24 on 6 April 2024 with Russian cosmonaut Oleg Kononenko continuing his ISS command from Expedition 70. It ended with his departure on Soyuz MS-25 with crewmates from MS-24 and MS-25 on 23 September 2024.

== Background, Crew, and Events ==
Initially, the expedition consisted of Kononenko, his Russian Soyuz MS-24 crewmate Nikolai Chub (both on a year long ISS mission since 15 September 2023), and his American Soyuz MS-25 crewmate, Tracy Caldwell-Dyson, who launched on 23 March 2024, as well as SpaceX Crew-8 crewmates, American astronauts Matthew Dominick, Michael Barratt, and Jeanette Epps, and Russian cosmonaut Alexander Grebenkin, who launched on 4 March 2024 and were transferred from Expedition 70 after Soyuz MS-24 departure.

NASA astronauts Barry Wilmore and Sunita Williams arrived at the station on 6 June 2024 as part of the Boeing Crew Flight Test. Their visit was planned to be brief. However, due to technical issues with their spacecraft, their stay was extended, and they became de facto members of the ISS crew. They assisted with various tasks, including research, housekeeping, and maintenance. On 24 August 2024, NASA announced that the Boeing Starliner spacecraft would return to Earth uncrewed, with Wilmore and Williams being formally added to the Expedition 71/72 crew and returning aboard SpaceX Crew-9 on 18 March 2025.

On 11 September 2024, Soyuz MS-26 arrived at the station, transporting Roscosmos cosmonauts Aleksey Ovchinin and Ivan Vagner, as well as NASA astronaut Donald Pettit.

== Events manifest ==
Events involving crewed spacecraft are listed in bold.

Previous mission: Expedition 70

- 6 April 2024 – **Soyuz MS-24 undocking (includes Visiting Expedition 21), official switch from Expedition 70**
- 25 April 2024 – EVA-1 (VKD-62) Kononenko/Chub: 4 hrs, 36 mins
- 28 April 2024 – CRS SpX-30 undocking
- 2 May 2024 – **SpaceX Crew-8 redocking**
- 28 May 2024 – Progress MS-25/86P undocking
- 1 June 2024 – Progress MS-27/88P docking
- 6 June 2024 – **Boeing Crew Flight Test docking**
- 24 June 2024 – EVA-2 (US-90) Dyson/Barratt: 31 mins
- 12 July 2024 – CRS NG-20 unberthing and release
- 6 August 2024 – CRS NG-21 capture and berthing
- 13 August 2024 – Progress MS-26/87P undocking
- 17 August 2024 – Progress MS-28/89P docking
- 4 September 2024 – Wilmore and Williams' seat liner moved from Boeing CFT swapped to SpaceX Crew-8 for CFT uncrewed landing
- 6 September 2024 – Boeing Crew Flight Test uncrewed undocking
- 11 September 2024 – **Soyuz MS-26 docking**
- 22 September 2024 – ISS Expedition 71/72 change of command ceremony from Oleg Kononenko to Sunita Williams
- 23 September 2024 – **Soyuz MS-25 undocking, official switch to Expedition 72**

Next: Expedition 72

== Crew ==
Flight	Astronaut	Increment 71a	Increment 71b	Increment 71c
Flight	Astronaut	6 Apr – 6 Jun 2024	6 Jun – 11 Sep 2024	11 – 23 Sep 2024
Soyuz MS-25	Oleg Kononenko, Roscosmos; Fifth spaceflight	Commander		
Soyuz MS-25	Nikolai Chub, Roscosmos; First spaceflight	Flight engineer		
Soyuz MS-25	Tracy Caldwell-Dyson, NASA; Third spaceflight	Flight engineer		
SpaceX Crew-8	Matthew Dominick, NASA; First spaceflight	Flight engineer		
SpaceX Crew-8	Michael Barratt, NASA; Third spaceflight	Flight engineer		
SpaceX Crew-8	Jeanette Epps, NASA; Only spaceflight	Flight engineer		
SpaceX Crew-8	Alexander Grebenkin, Roscosmos; First spaceflight	Flight engineer		
Boeing Crew Flight Test	Barry E. Wilmore, NASA; Third and last spaceflight	Off station	Flight engineer	
Boeing Crew Flight Test	Sunita Williams, NASA; Third and last spaceflight	Off station	Flight engineer	
Soyuz MS-26	Aleksey Ovchinin, Roscosmos; Third (Note: Not counting the aborted flight of Soyuz MS-10.) spaceflight	Off station		Flight engineer
Soyuz MS-26	Ivan Vagner, Roscosmos; Second spaceflight	Off station		Flight engineer
Soyuz MS-26	Donald Pettit, NASA; Fourth spaceflight	Off station		Flight engineer

=== Crewed test flight ===
Mission	Astronauts	Docking (UTC)	Undocking (UTC)	Duration
Boeing Crew Flight Test	Barry Wilmore, NASA; Sunita Williams, NASA	6 June 2024, 17:34	6 September 2024, 22:04 (uncrewed)	93 days
Boeing Crew Flight Test	Besides the expedition crew, a Boeing Starliner spacecraft visited the station for a crewed flight test, consisting of NASA astronauts Barry Wilmore and Sunita Williams. The spacecraft Calypso launched and docked to the station in June 2024. The flight marked the first crewed test flight of the Starliner. Crew members were scheduled to stay aboard the station for approximately 6 days, but the mission was extended due to issues with the spacecraft. Despite months of testing, NASA felt it was not able to understand why the thrusters malfunctioned and decided that it was too risky to return Wilmore and Williams to Earth aboard Starliner. Instead, they rode down on the SpaceX Crew-9 Dragon capsule, and the Boeing spacecraft returned uncrewed. Until Crew-9 arrived, they along with their seat liners moved to SpaceX Crew-8, their temporary emergency evacuation spacecraft, after which they and their seat liners transferred to Crew-9. It was the first launch of humans from Cape Canaveral since Apollo 7 in October 1968 and first launch of humans from SLC-41.			

== Vehicle manifest ==
Vehicle	Purpose	Port	Docking/capture date	Undocking date
Vehicles inherited from Expedition 70
Progress MS-25	Cargo	Poisk zenith	3 Dec 2023	28 May 2024
CRS NG-20	Cargo	Unity nadir	1 Feb 2024	12 Jul 2024
Progress MS-26	Cargo	Zvezda aft	17 Feb 2024	13 Aug 2024
SpaceX Crew-8 "Endeavour"	Exp. 70/71/72 crew	Harmony forward	5 Mar 2024	2 May 2024 (redock)
SpaceX Crew-8 "Endeavour"	Exp. 70/71/72 crew	Harmony zenith	2 May 2024 (redock)	23 Oct 2024 (Exp. 72)
CRS SpX-30	Cargo	Harmony zenith	23 Mar 2024	28 Apr 2024
Soyuz MS-25 "Kazbek"	Exp. 70/71 crew, Visiting Expedition 21	Prichal nadir	25 Mar 2024	23 Sep 2024
Vehicles docked during Expedition 71
Progress MS-27	Cargo	Poisk zenith	1 Jun 2024	19 Nov 2024 (Exp. 72)
Boeing CFT "Calypso"	Visiting CCDev mission	Harmony forward	6 Jun 2024	6 Sep 2024
CRS NG-21	Cargo	Unity nadir	6 Aug 2024	28 Mar 2025 (Exp. 72)
Progress MS-28	Cargo	Zvezda aft	17 Aug 2024	25 Feb 2025 (Exp. 72)
Soyuz MS-26 "Burlak"	Exp. 71/72 crew	Rassvet nadir	11 Sep 2024	19 Apr 2025 (Exp. 72)

Segment	U.S. Orbital Segment				Russian Orbital Segment			
Period	Harmony forward	Harmony zenith	Harmony nadir	Unity nadir	Rassvet nadir	Prichal nadir	Poisk zenith	Zvezda aft
6–28 Apr 2024	SpaceX Crew-8	CRS SpX-30	Vacant	CRS NG-20	Vacant	Soyuz MS-25	Progress MS-25	Progress MS-26
28 Apr–2 May 2024	SpaceX Crew-8	Vacant	Vacant	CRS NG-20	Vacant	Soyuz MS-25	Progress MS-25	Progress MS-26
2–28 May 2024	Vacant	SpaceX Crew-8	Vacant	CRS NG-20	Vacant	Soyuz MS-25	Progress MS-25	Progress MS-26
28 May–1 Jun 2024	Vacant	SpaceX Crew-8	Vacant	CRS NG-20	Vacant	Soyuz MS-25	Vacant	Progress MS-26
1–6 Jun 2024	Vacant	SpaceX Crew-8	Vacant	CRS NG-20	Vacant	Soyuz MS-25	Progress MS-27	Progress MS-26
6 Jun–12 Jul 2024	Boeing CFT	SpaceX Crew-8	Vacant	CRS NG-20	Vacant	Soyuz MS-25	Progress MS-27	Progress MS-26
12 Jul–6 Aug 2024	Boeing CFT	SpaceX Crew-8	Vacant	Vacant	Vacant	Soyuz MS-25	Progress MS-27	Progress MS-26
6–13 Aug 2024	Boeing CFT	SpaceX Crew-8	Vacant	CRS NG-21	Vacant	Soyuz MS-25	Progress MS-27	Progress MS-26
13–17 Aug 2024	Boeing CFT	SpaceX Crew-8	Vacant	CRS NG-21	Vacant	Soyuz MS-25	Progress MS-27	Vacant
17 Aug–6 Sep 2024	Boeing CFT	SpaceX Crew-8	Vacant	CRS NG-21	Vacant	Soyuz MS-25	Progress MS-27	Progress MS-28
6–11 Sep 2024	Vacant	SpaceX Crew-8	Vacant	CRS NG-21	Vacant	Soyuz MS-25	Progress MS-27	Progress MS-28
11-23 Sep 2024	Vacant	SpaceX Crew-8	Vacant	CRS NG-21	Soyuz MS-26	Soyuz MS-25	Progress MS-27	Progress MS-28

The Prichal aft, forward, starboard, and aft ports all have yet to be used since the module originally docked to the station and are not included in the table.
