= Alexander Grebenkin =

Russian cosmonaut (born 1982)

- Александр Гребёнкин
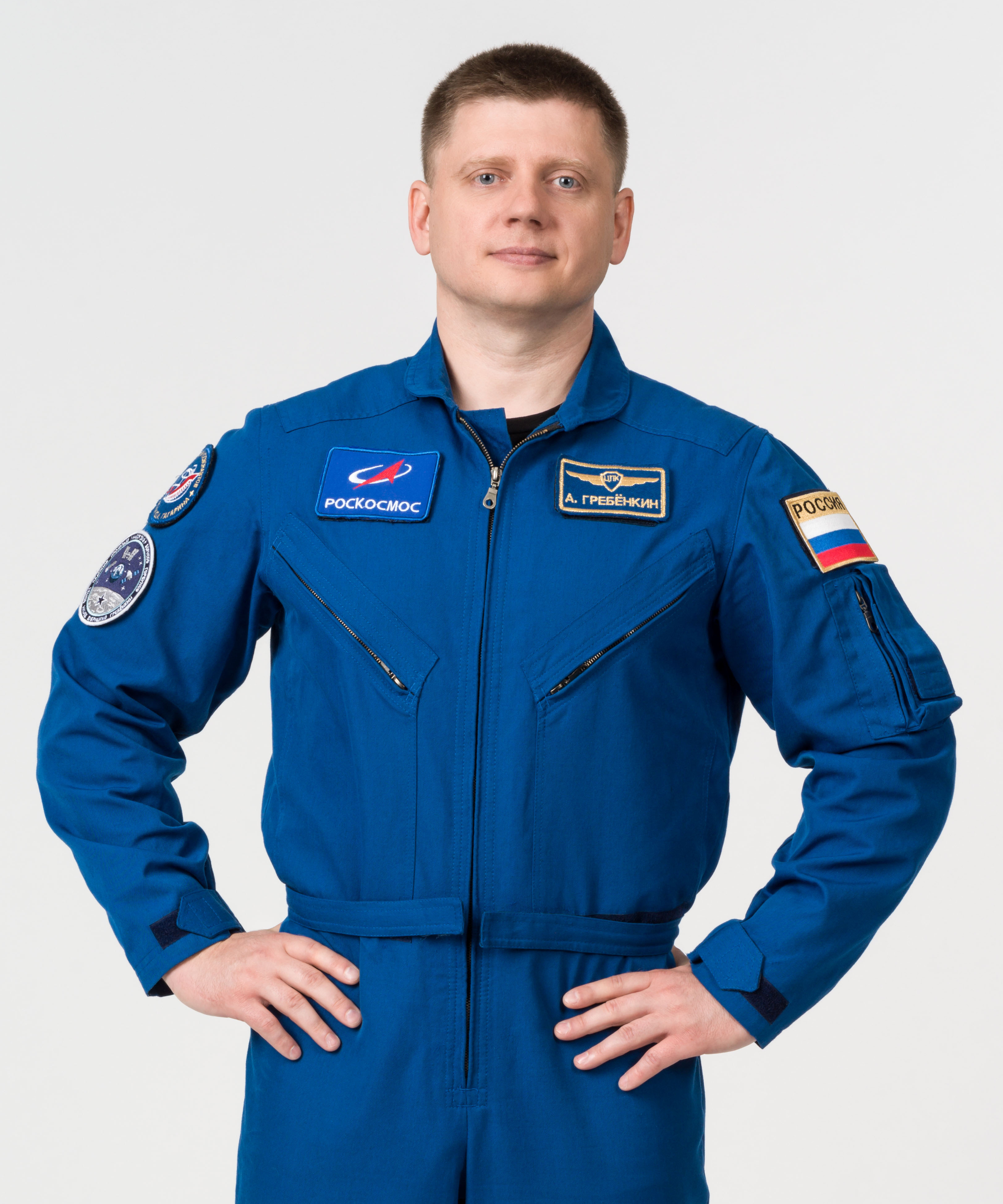
- Grebenkin in 2023
- Born: 15 July 1982 (age 44); Myski, USSR
- Education: Moscow Technical University of Communications and Informatics
- Occupation: Test cosmonaut
- Space career

Roscosmos cosmonaut
- Status: Active
- Rank: Captain, Russian Air Force
- Time in space: 235 days, 3 hours, 35 minutes
- Selection: 17th Cosmonaut Group (2018)
- Missions: SpaceX Crew-8 (Expedition 70/71/72)

Alexander Sergeyevich Grebenkin (Russian: Александр Сергеевич Гребёнкин; born 15 July 1982) is a Russian cosmonaut who flew on the SpaceX Crew-8 mission.

Before joining the cosmonaut corps, he served in the technical and operational units of the Air Force of the Aerospace Forces of the Russian Armed Forces.

== Biography ==
Grebenkin graduated from the Irkutsk Military Aerospace Engineering Institute with the qualification of "technician diploma" in the specialty "Technical operation of transport radio-electronics" on June 21, 2002.

From July 2002 to November 6, 2018, he served at the Kubinka airbase in the Moscow region.

On March 15, 2011, he graduated in absentia from the Moscow Technical University of Communications and Informatics with the qualification of "engineer" in the specialty "Radio communications, Broadcasting and Television.

== Military career ==
From July 2002 to July 2005, Grebenkin served as an aircraft readiness technician in Novy Gorodok, Odintsovsky District. From July 2005 to October 2010, he worked as an engineer. First, as a technician and engineer for preparing aircraft for flights according to the avionics of the Swifts aerobatic team, then, from November 2009 to January 2011, as an engineer and head of the regulations and repair group of a military unit.

In January 2011, Grebyonkin was appointed head of the technical and operational unit of the 237th I.N. Kozhedub Aviation Equipment Display Center, and was awarded the military rank of major.

== Cosmonaut career ==
On March 14, 2017, Grebyonkin applied for recruitment to the cosmonaut corps of the Yuri Gagarin Scientific Research Institute of Cosmonauts. On August 9, 2018, his candidacy was considered at a meeting of the competition commission and on August 10, 2018 he was named a candidate for astronauts.

On November 6, 2018, he was transferred to the Yuri Gagarin Cosmonaut Training Center (CTC), enrolled in the cosmonaut corps and began general space training.

From February 26 to 28, 2019, as part of a mock crew, together with Alexander Gorbunov and CTC instructor Dmitry Sukhanov, he took part in training on actions after landing in a wooded and swampy area in winter ("winter survival"). From August 26 to August 30, as part of a group of cosmonaut candidates, he underwent diving training at the Noginsk Rescue Center of the Russian Emergencies Ministry. On August 30, 2019, he passed the exam, and was awarded the qualification "diver". In October 2019, as part of a conditional crew, together with Alexei Zubritsky and Evgeny Prokopyev, he went through a full cycle of "water survival" ("dry", "long" and "short" training) at the Universal Marine Terminal Base, "Imeretinsky", on the Black Sea in the Adler district of the city of Sochi.

Grebyonkin was selected in the class of 2018 group of Russian cosmonauts. On November 24, 2020, he passed the State exam following the completion of the general space training course. On December 2, 2020, by the decision of the Interdepartmental Qualification Commission (MVK), following the results of a meeting at the Yu. A. Gagarin CTC, he was awarded the qualification of a test cosmonaut.

In July 2021, as part of a mock crew, together with Alexander Gorbunov and Alexei Zubritsky, he participated in a two-day training session to practice actions after landing a spacecraft in the desert.

On January 20, 2022, at a meeting of the Roscosmos Interdepartmental Commission, he was approved as Flight Engineer 2 of the International Space Station Expedition 71. He then began to train with Sergei Ryzhikov and Sergei Mikayev. They participated in training on actions after landing the spacecraft on the water surface, which took place on the basis of the 179th Center of the Ministry of Emergency Situations in Noginsk. On February 14, 2023, the same crew, along with astronaut Donald Pettit, practiced survival skills in the winter forest.

On March 1, 2023, at a meeting of the Interdepartmental Commission of the State Corporation Roscosmos, he was appointed as a stand-in for cosmonaut Konstantin Borisov on the flight of the SpaceX Crew-7 mission and was included in the prime crew of the American spacecraft Crew Dragon (SpaceX Crew-8 mission), which launched to the ISS on 4 March 2024.

On July 11, 2023, by the decision of the main medical commission of the Yu.A. Gagarin, Grebenkin was declared fit for spaceflight for health reasons.

== Flight ==
Grebenkin launched with SpaceX Crew-8 on 4 March 2024 to serve as a flight engineer on Expedition 70/71/72, where he stayed 8 months.
