= SpaceX Crew-8 =

2024 American crewed spaceflight to the ISS

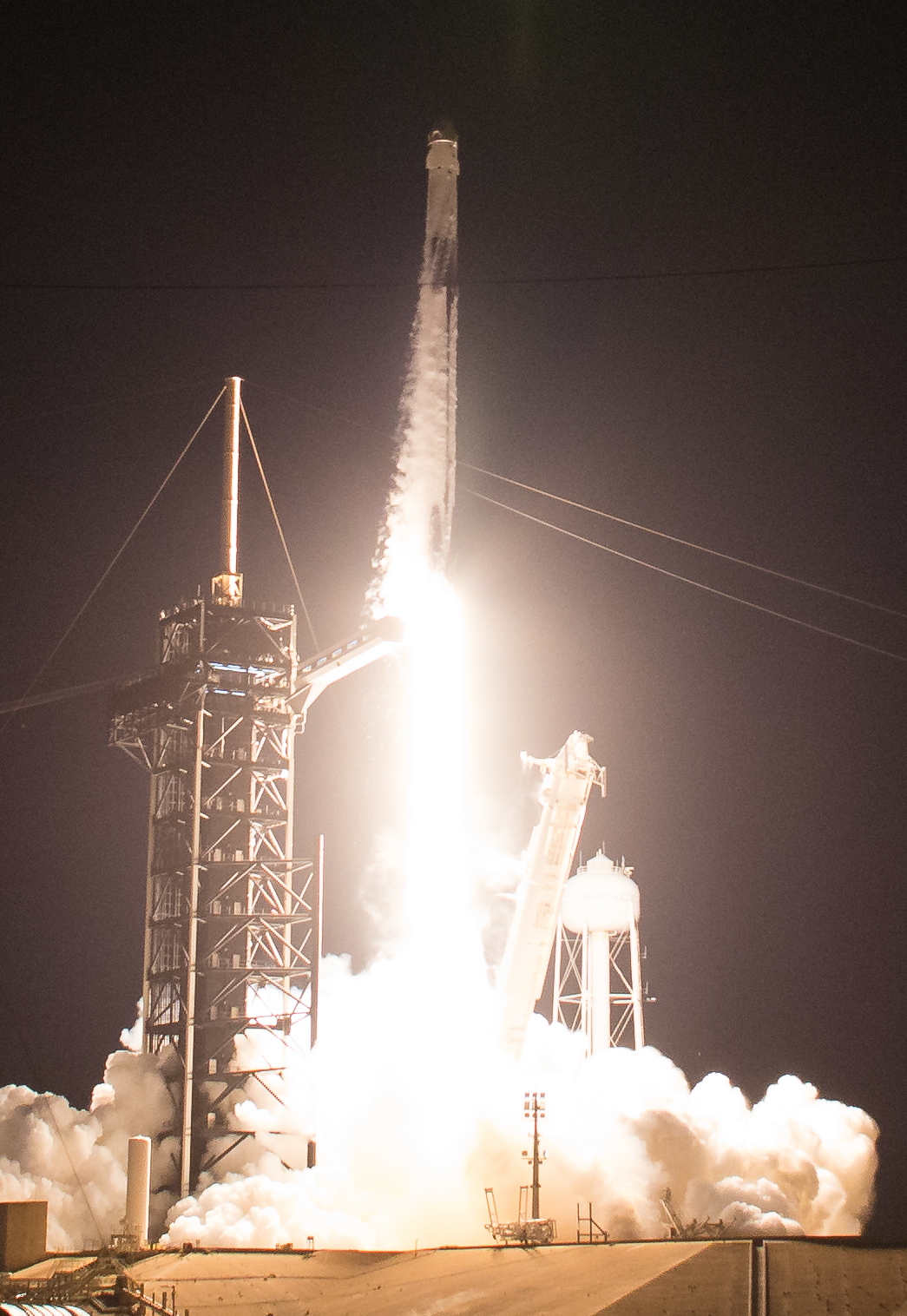
- Crew Dragon Endeavour lifts off from LC-39A
- Names: USCV-8
- Mission type: ISS crew transport
- Operator: SpaceX
- COSPAR ID: 2024-042A
- SATCAT no.: 59097
- Mission duration: 235 days, 3 hours, 35 minutes
- Distance travelled: 100 million mi (160 million km)
- Orbits completed: 3,760

Spacecraft properties
- Spacecraft: Crew Dragon Endeavour
- Spacecraft type: Crew Dragon
- Manufacturer: SpaceX

Crew
- Crew size: 4
- Members: Matthew Dominick; Michael Barratt; Jeanette Epps; Alexander Grebenkin
- Expedition: Expedition 70/71/72

Start of mission
- Launch date: March 4, 2024, 03:53:38 UTC (March 3, 10:53:38 pm EST)
- Rocket: Falcon 9 Block 5 (B1083‑1), Flight 305
- Launch site: Kennedy, LC‑39A

End of mission
- Recovered by: MV Megan
- Landing date: October 25, 2024, 07:29:02 UTC (3:29:02 am EDT)
- Landing site: Gulf of Mexico, near Pensacola, Florida (29°48′40″N 87°33′25″W)

Orbital parameters
- Reference system: Geocentric orbit
- Regime: Low Earth orbit
- Inclination: 51.65°

Docking with ISS
- Docking port: Harmony forward
- Docking date: March 5, 2024, 08:00 UTC
- Undocking date: May 2, 2024, 12:57 UTC
- Time docked: 58 days, 4 hours, 57 minutes

Docking with ISS (relocation) (Note: From an orbital dynamics perspective, the forward port is easier to approach, and therefore, new vehicles use this approach for their first docking. The Boeing Starliner Calypso was scheduled to make its first docking to the ISS during the Boeing Crew Flight Test in June 2024; therefore, Crew-8 relocated to the zenith port to clear the forward port for Boe-CFT.)
- Docking port: Harmony zenith
- Docking date: May 2, 2024, 13:46 UTC
- Undocking date: October 23, 2024, 21:05 UTC
- Time docked: 174 days, 7 hours, 19 minutes
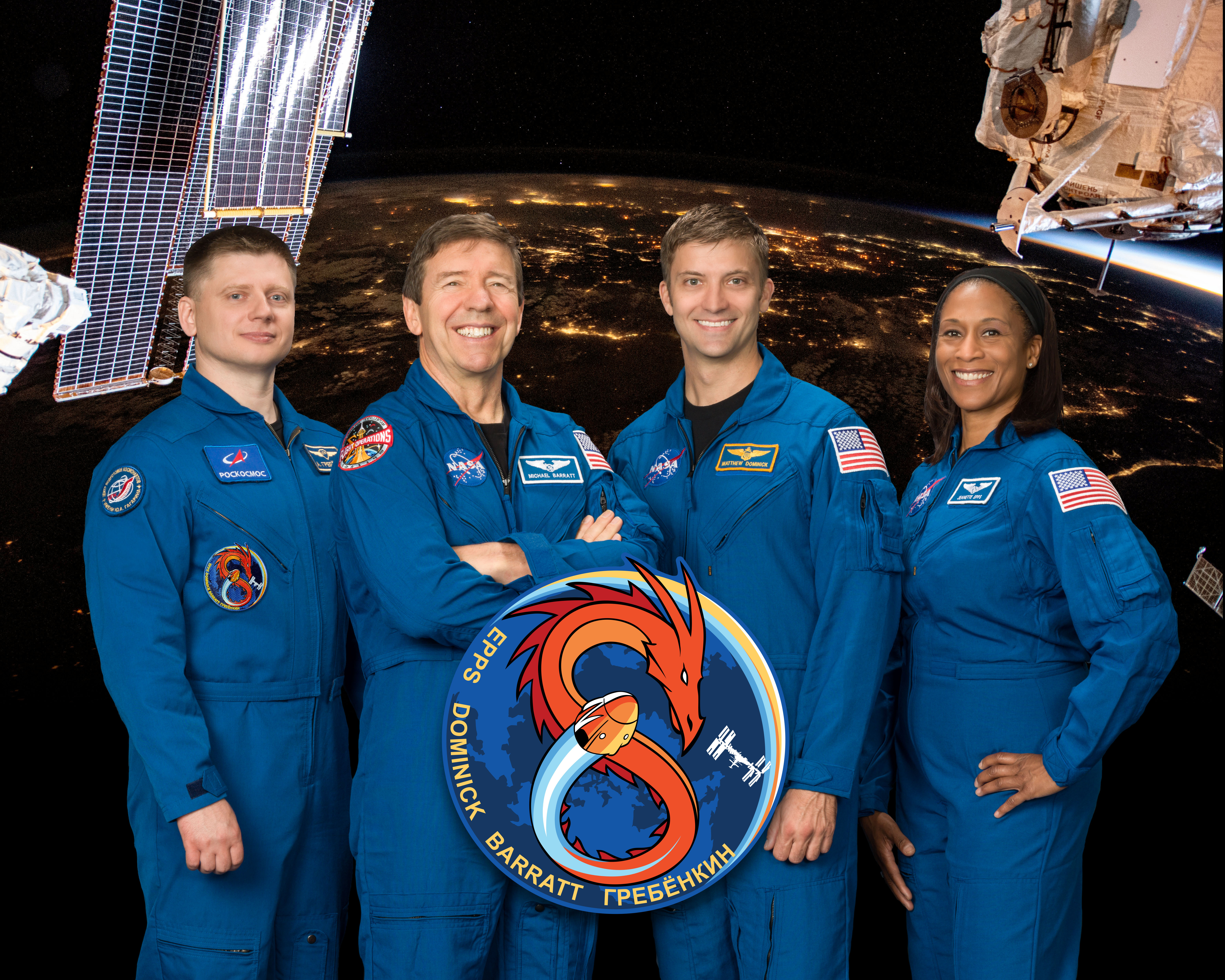
- NASA (left) and SpaceX (right) mission patches From left: Grebenkin, Barratt, Dominick, and Epps Commercial Crew Program Crew Dragon flights

SpaceX Crew-8 was the eighth crewed operational NASA Commercial Crew flight and the 13th overall crewed orbital flight of a Crew Dragon spacecraft. The mission launched on March 4, 2024.

The Crew-8 mission transported four crew members to the International Space Station (ISS). Three NASA astronauts, Matthew Dominick, Michael Barratt, and Jeanette Epps, and one Roscosmos cosmonaut, Alexander Grebenkin, were assigned to the mission.

The Crew-8 mission was extended to accommodate problems encountered by the Boeing Crew Flight Test during its mission. The crew outfitted the Crew-8 capsule to accommodate two extra astronauts if an emergency occurred prior to Crew-9 docking on September 29, 2024.

== Crew ==
Position	Crew
Commander	Matthew Dominick, NASA; Expedition 70/71/72; First spaceflight
Pilot	Michael Barratt, NASA; Expedition 70/71/72; Third spaceflight
Mission specialist	Jeanette Epps, NASA; Expedition 70/71/72; Only spaceflight
Mission specialist	Alexander Grebenkin, Roscosmos; Expedition 70/71/72; First spaceflight

== Mission ==
Crew-8 was the eighth SpaceX operational mission in the Commercial Crew Program and the 13th overall crewed orbital flight of a Crew Dragon spacecraft. The mission launched at 3:53:38 UTC on 4 March 2024 (3 March, 10:53:38 pm EST, local time at the launch site). SpaceX sent the 50th astronaut on this Crew Dragon launch.

The first launch attempt, the day prior was scrubbed at T−03:25:38 due to elevated winds in offshore areas of the flight path.

=== Launch attempt summary ===
Note: times are local to the launch site (Eastern Daylight Time).

Attempt	Planned	Result	Turnaround	Reason	Decision point	Weather go (%)	Notes
1	2 Mar 2024, 11:16:00 pm	Scrubbed	—	Weather	3 Mar 2024, 8:51 pm (T−03:25:38)	40	Elevated ascent winds
2	3 Mar 2024, 10:53:38 pm	Success	0 days 23 hours 38 minutes			75	

=== Relocation ===
To make way for a Boeing Starliner as a part of the planned May 6, 2024 Boeing Crew Flight Test that would dock to the forward port of Harmony, the crew relocated Crew Dragon Endeavour to the zenith port of Harmony on May 2, 2024, docking to the zenith port at 13:46 UTC. After several delays, Starliner docked on June 6, 2024. Boeing Starliner Calypso successfully launched on June 5, 2024, and docked to the forward port of Harmony on June 6.

=== Support for Starliner CFT ===
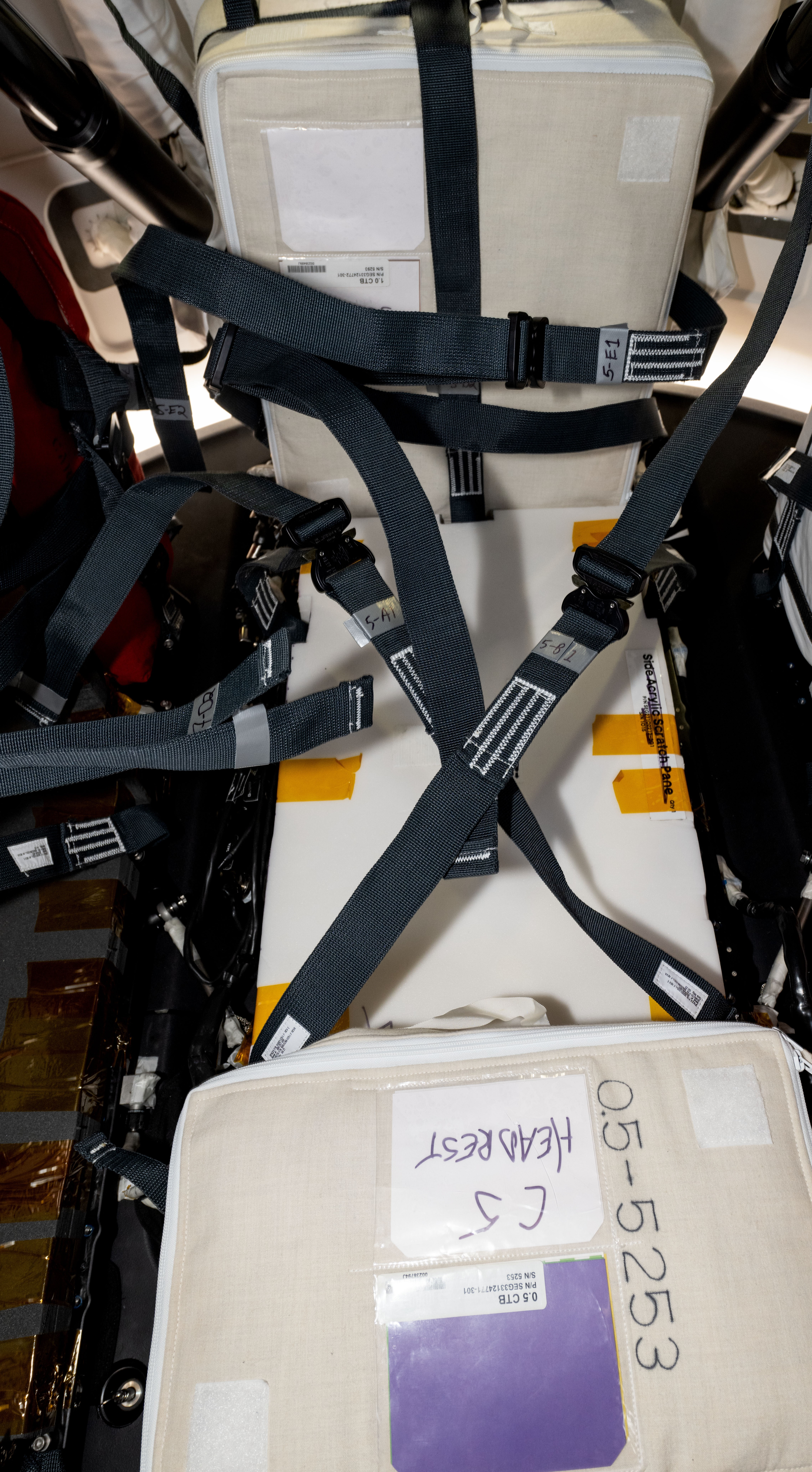
Temporary seat structures built and installed on the Crew Dragon using foam, straps, and other station soft goods such as cushions.

The Boeing Crew Flight Test mission docked with the ISS on June 6, 2024, after experiencing anomalies with its thrusters. Its crew of two remained on the ISS for an unplanned extended stay, while NASA and Boeing evaluated the problems. NASA decided that the uncertainties were too high to have the crew return to Earth on Starliner, so they sent the Crew-9 mission to the ISS with a crew of two, and the Starliner crew then returned to Earth with Crew-9 in March 2025, while Starliner undocked from the ISS and made a successful uncrewed return to Earth in September 2024. This was necessary, because the ISS has only two IDSS ports shared between Dragon and Starliner. However, each ISS crewmember needs a contingency "lifeboat" in the event of an ISS emergency, and uncrewed undocking of the Starliner would leave its crew without a lifeboat. Therefore, NASA directed the crews to install two extra crew positions in the cargo area of the Crew-8 capsule to provide the lifeboat function after Starliner undocks and before Crew-9 docked. Until Crew-9 arrived, they moved to SpaceX Crew-8, their temporary emergency evacuation spacecraft, and subsequently to Crew-9.

=== Mission duration ===
Crew-8 was originally planned to return to Earth in early August after a nominal 180-day mission, but the mission was extended several times. It was extended initially as NASA investigated the CFT situation and again to provide the lifeboat function while Boeing worked to reconfigure Starliner to perform the uncrewed return. The NASA maximum mission time for Crew Dragon is ordinarily 210 days, but NASA extended it to 240 days for this mission. The overlap after Crew-9 arrived was slightly longer than usual to allow time to reconfigure Crew-8 and Crew-9 as the Starliner astronauts moved to Crew-9. The return of Crew-8 was delayed for several additional weeks due to poor weather conditions in the splashdown zones surrounding Florida caused by Hurricane Milton and several other storms. The cumulative delays caused Crew-8 to become the longest Dragon mission at 236 days before it was later surpassed by SpaceX Crew-12 at 237 days.

=== Landing ===
Crew-8 undocked from the ISS on October 23, 2024, at 21:05 UTC. After completing 3,760 orbits and traveling nearly 100 million miles (160 million kilometers), Endeavour began its entry back into the Earth's atmosphere and splashed down in the Gulf of Mexico, near Pensacola, Florida on October 25, 2024, at 07:29:02 UTC (3:29:02 am EDT, local time at the landing site).

During the parachute deploy sequence, it was observed that the opening of main parachute was delayed. Additionally, drogue debris strikes were observed.

The capsule taken aboard the recovery ship MV Megan. After the crew exited the spacecraft, they were taken into the ship's onboard medical treatment facility for evaluations. After that check-up, NASA flew all of the crew members to the Ascension Sacred Heart Pensacola by helicopter for additional evaluation. One astronaut was hospitalized, but NASA declined to provide the individual's condition or identity. NASA said that the entry and splashdown was normal and the recovery of the crew and the spacecraft was without incident. The astronaut was released from the hospital the following day and was said to be in "good health".

== Gallery ==
SpaceX Crew-8
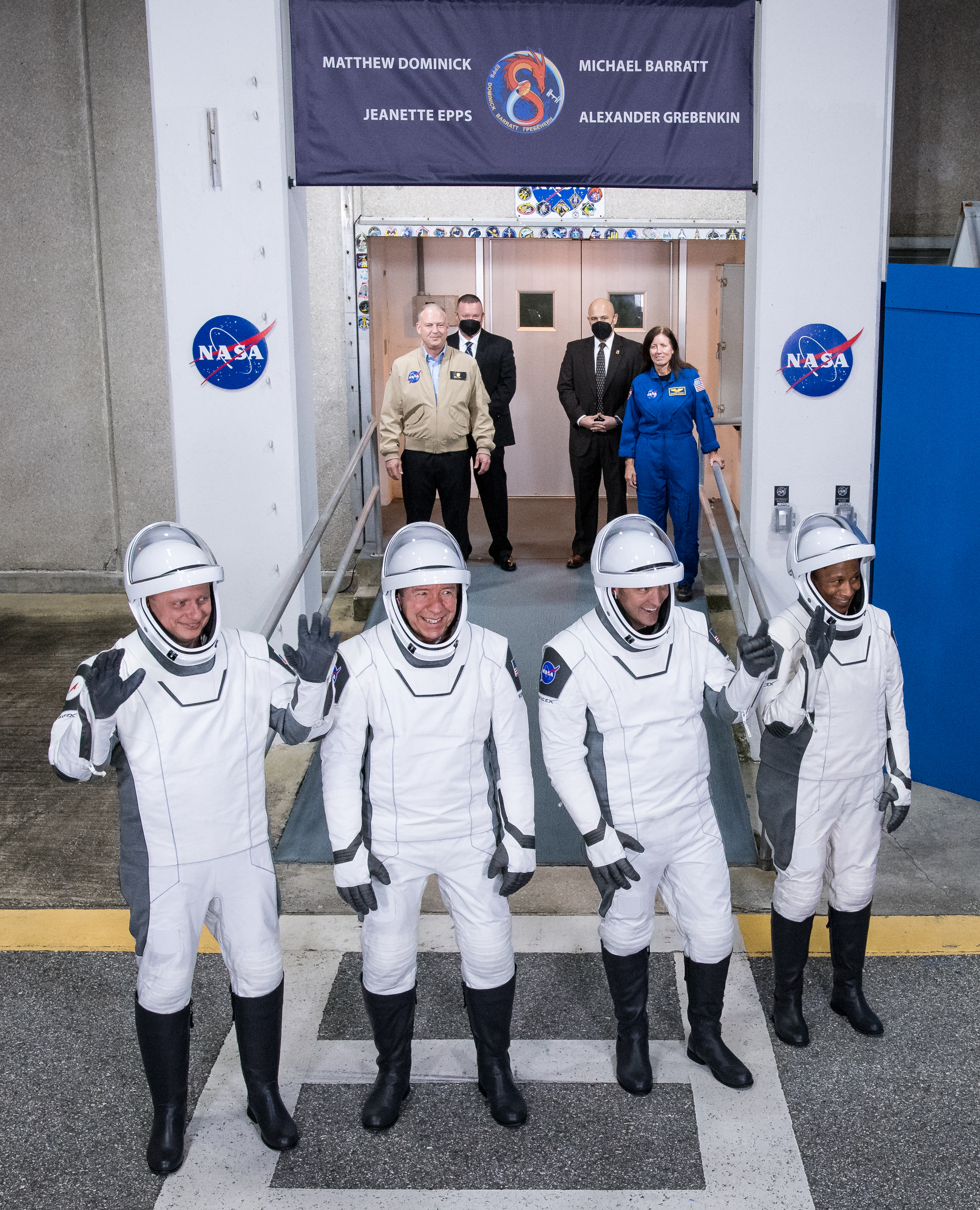
Crew-8 astronauts at the O&C Building

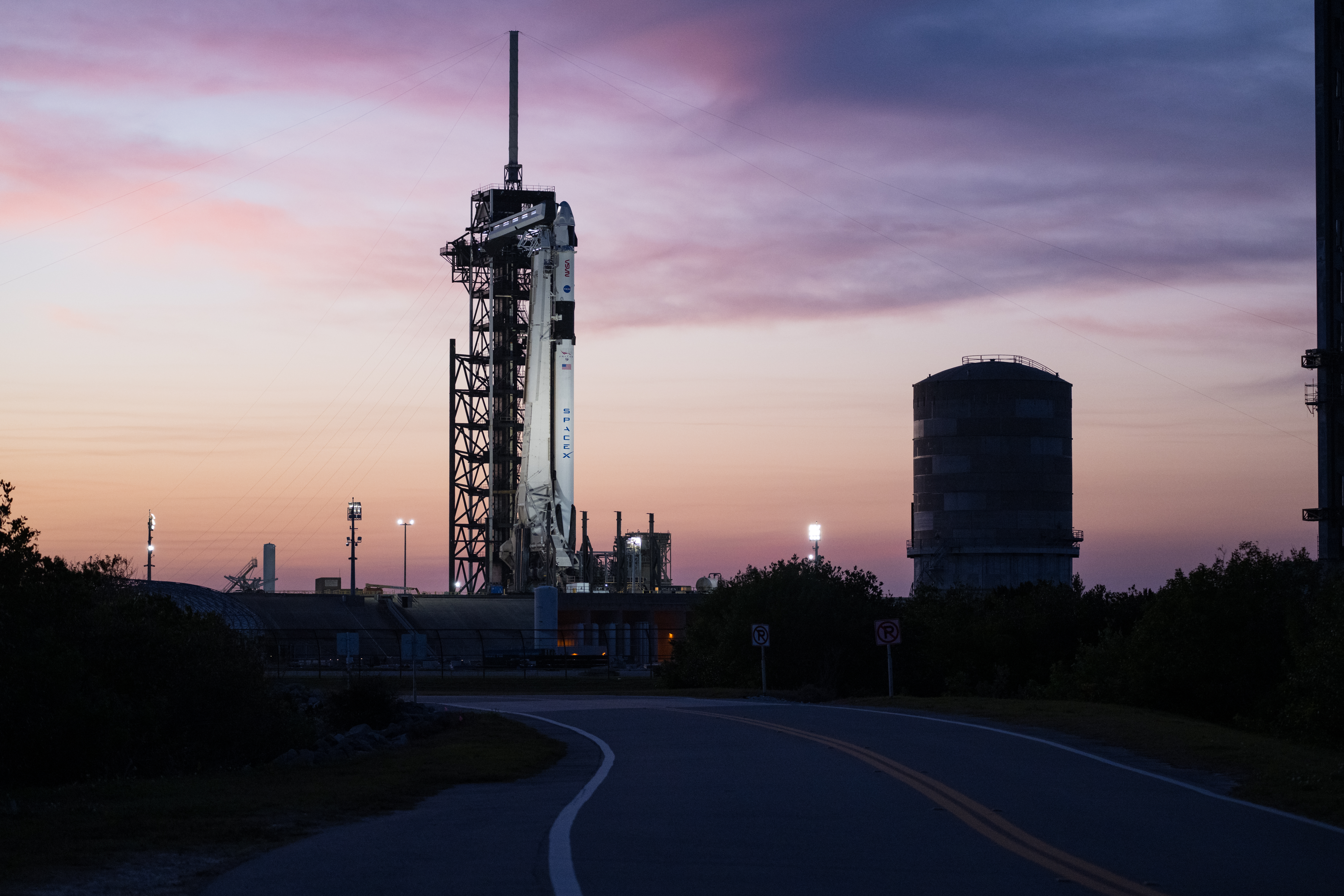
Crew Dragon Endeavour sits atop its Falcon 9 rocket on LC-39A

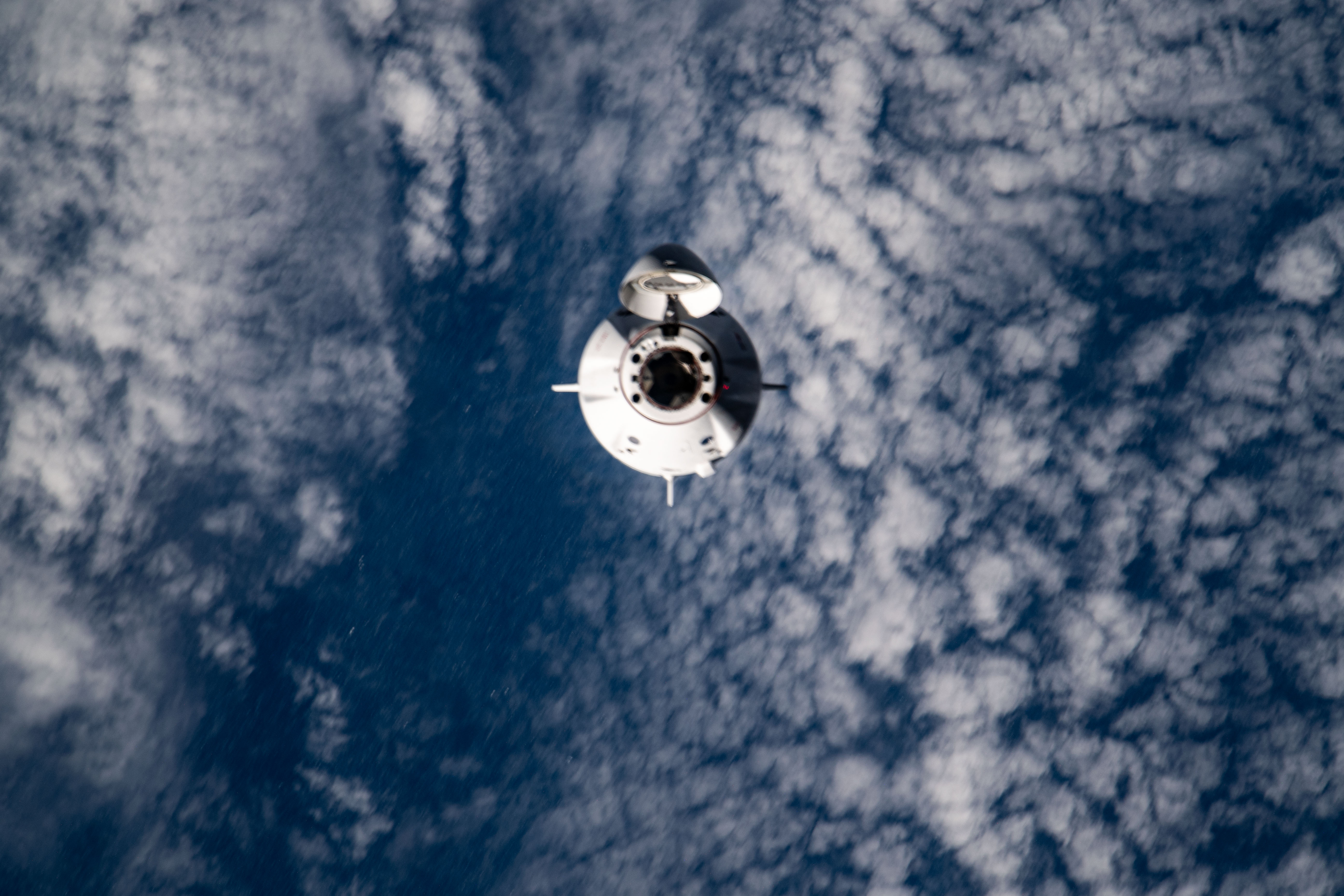
Crew Dragon Endeavour approaching the International Space Station

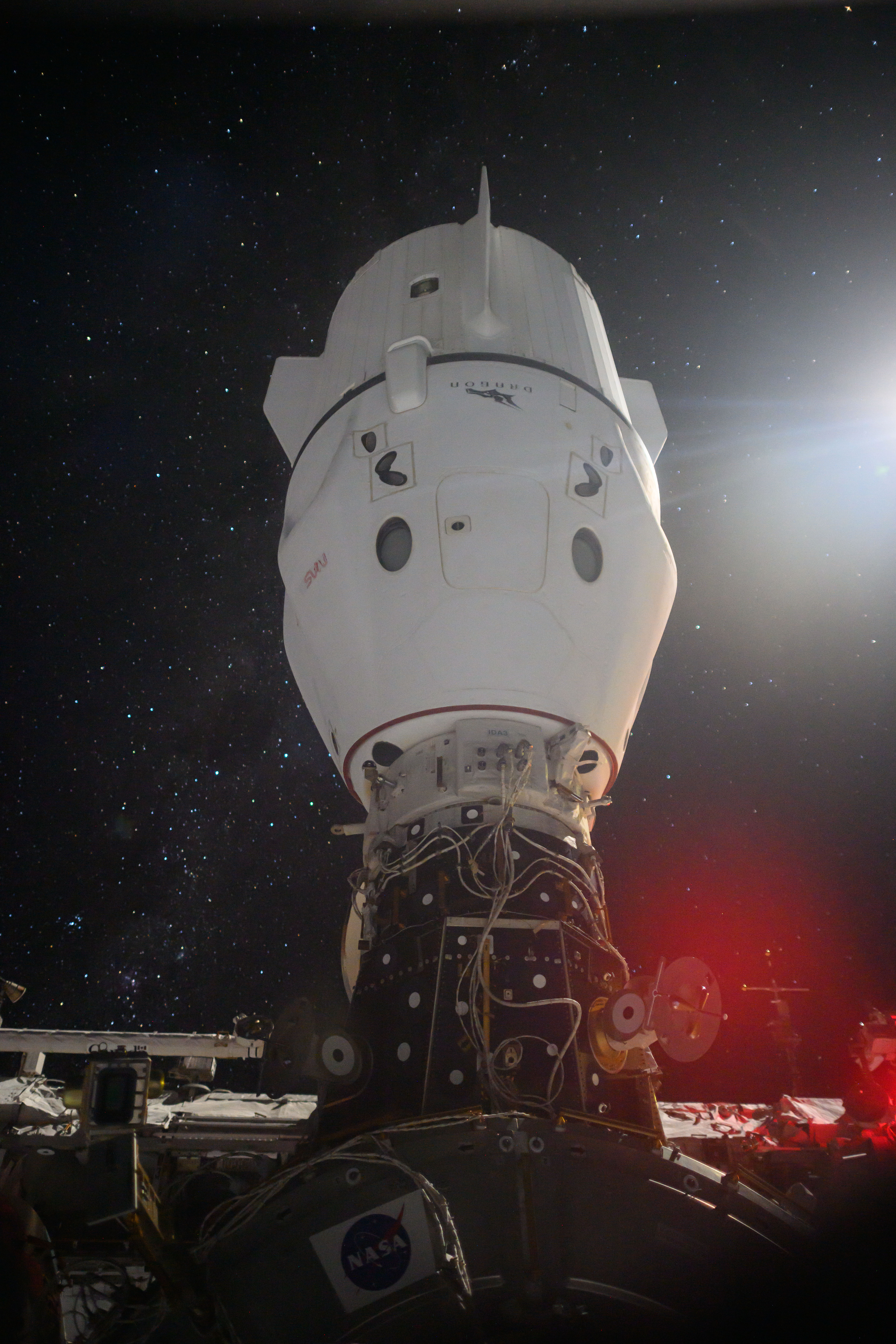
Crew Dragon Endeavour docked to the zenith port of the Harmony module of the ISS, as seen from inside the Boeing Starliner Calypso

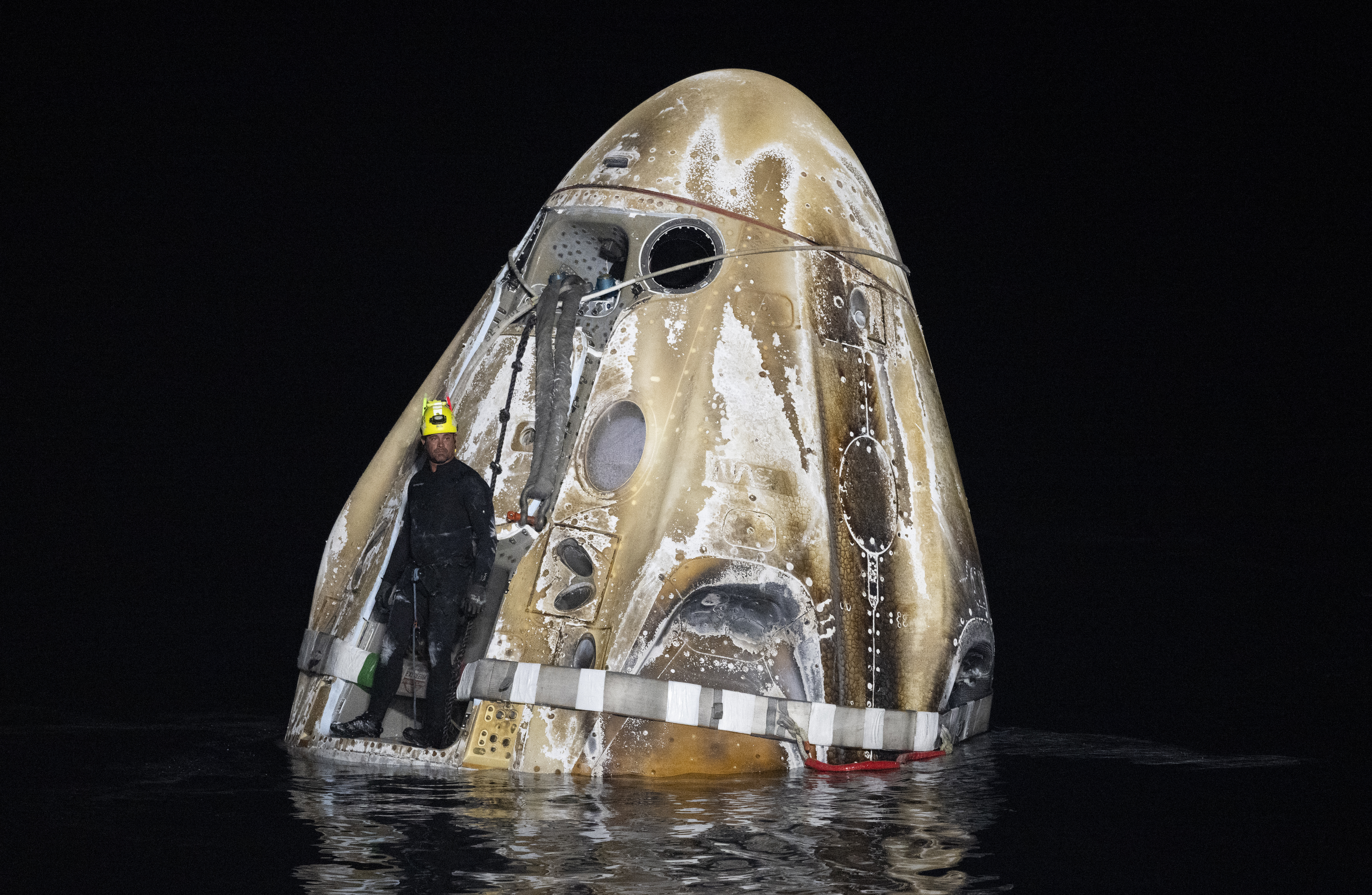
A SpaceX technician secures a strap around Crew Dragon Endeavour shortly after it splashed down in the Gulf of Mexico

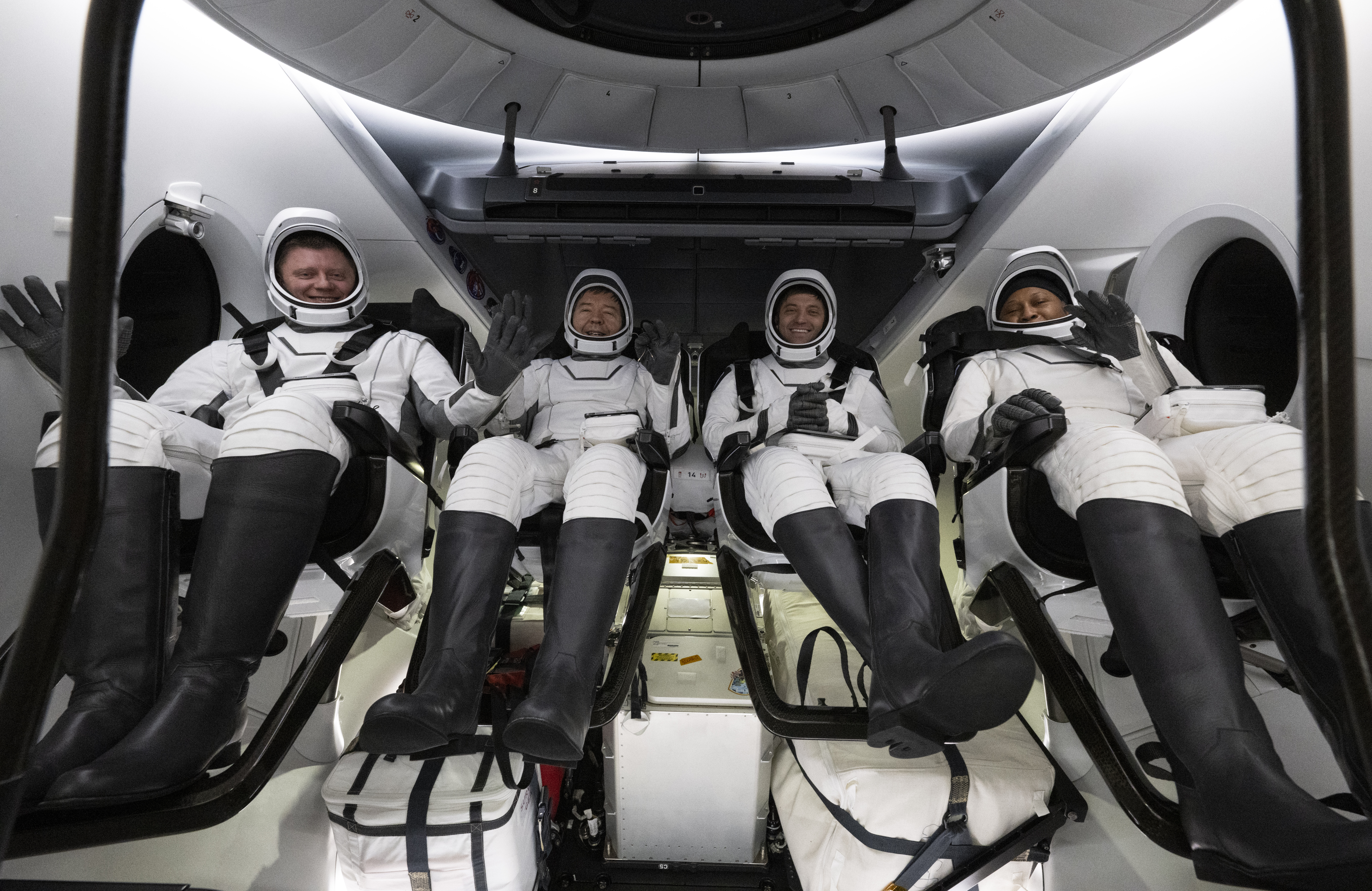
SpaceX Crew-8 astronauts inside Crew Dragon Endeavour shortly after splashdown and being lifted aboard MV Megan
