= Expedition 70 =

Long-duration mission to the International Space Station

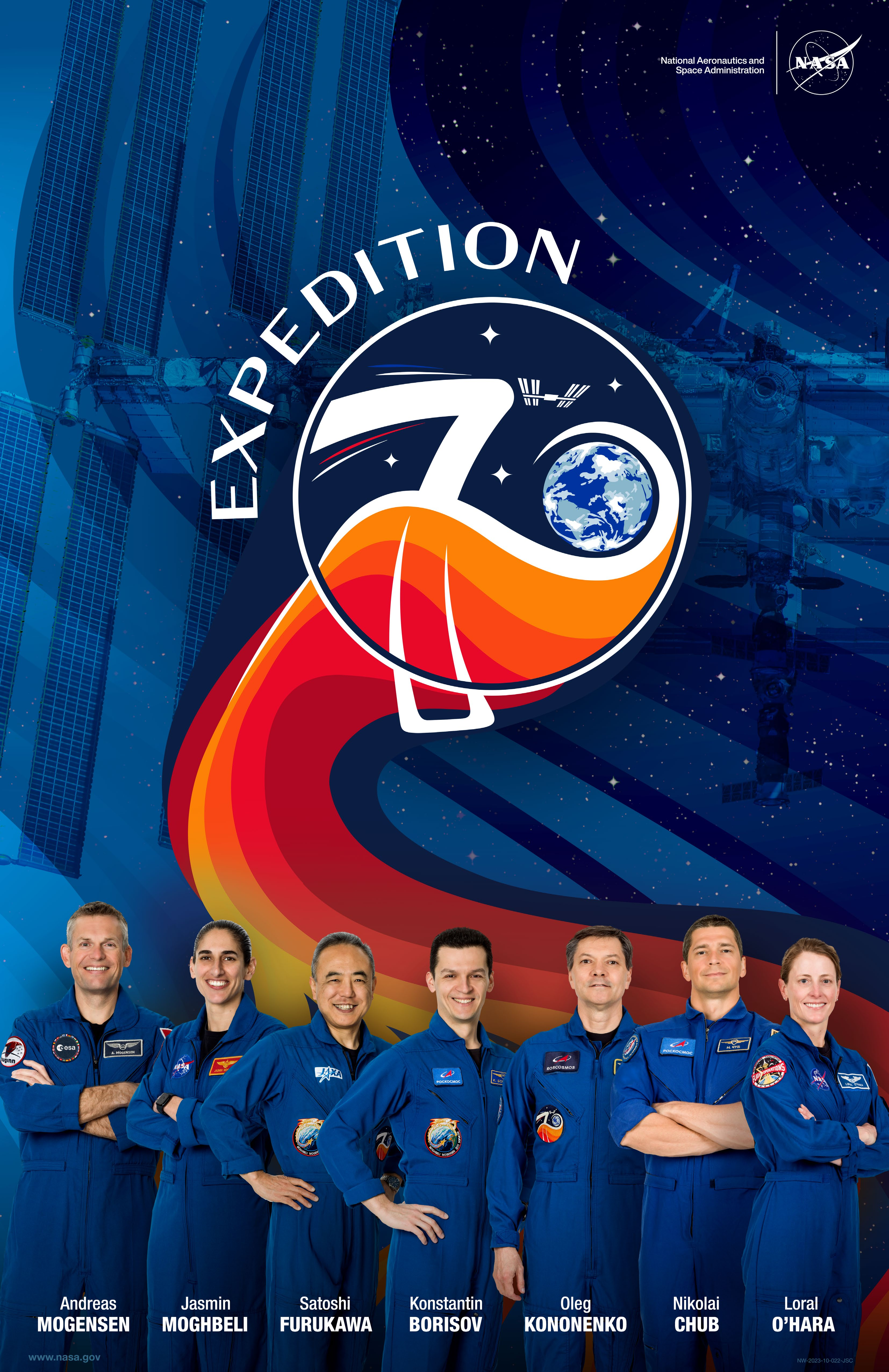
- Promotional Poster
- Mission type: Long-duration expedition
- Operator: NASA / Roscosmos
- Mission duration: 191 days and 20 hours

Expedition
- Space station: International Space Station
- Began: 27 September 2023
- Ended: 6 April 2024
- Arrived aboard: SpaceX Crew-7; Soyuz MS-24; SpaceX Crew-8; Soyuz MS-25
- Departed aboard: SpaceX Crew-7; Soyuz MS-24

Crew
- Crew size: 7–11
- Members: Expedition 69/70: Jasmin Moghbeli; Andreas Mogensen; Satoshi Furukawa; Konstantin Borisov; Loral O'Hara; Expedition 69/70/71: Oleg Kononenko; Nikolai Chub; Expedition 70/71/72: Matthew Dominick; Michael Barratt; Jeanette Epps; Alexander Grebenkin; Expedition 70/71: Tracy Caldwell-Dyson
- EVAs: 2
- EVA duration: 14 hours 23 minutes
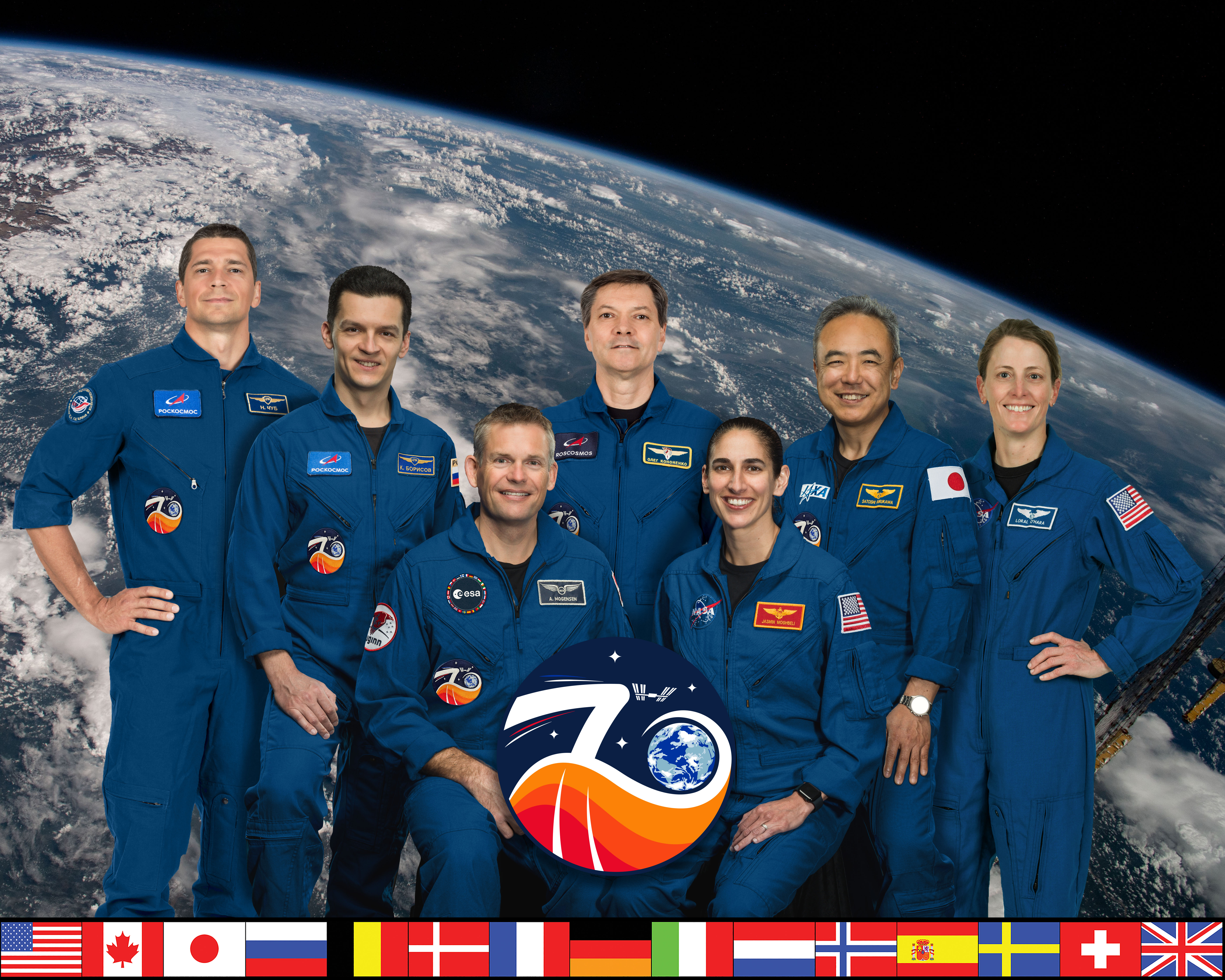
- Mission patch Top row, from left: Chub, Borisov, Kononenko, Furukawa, and O'Hara; Bottom row: Mogensen and Moghbeli Expeditions

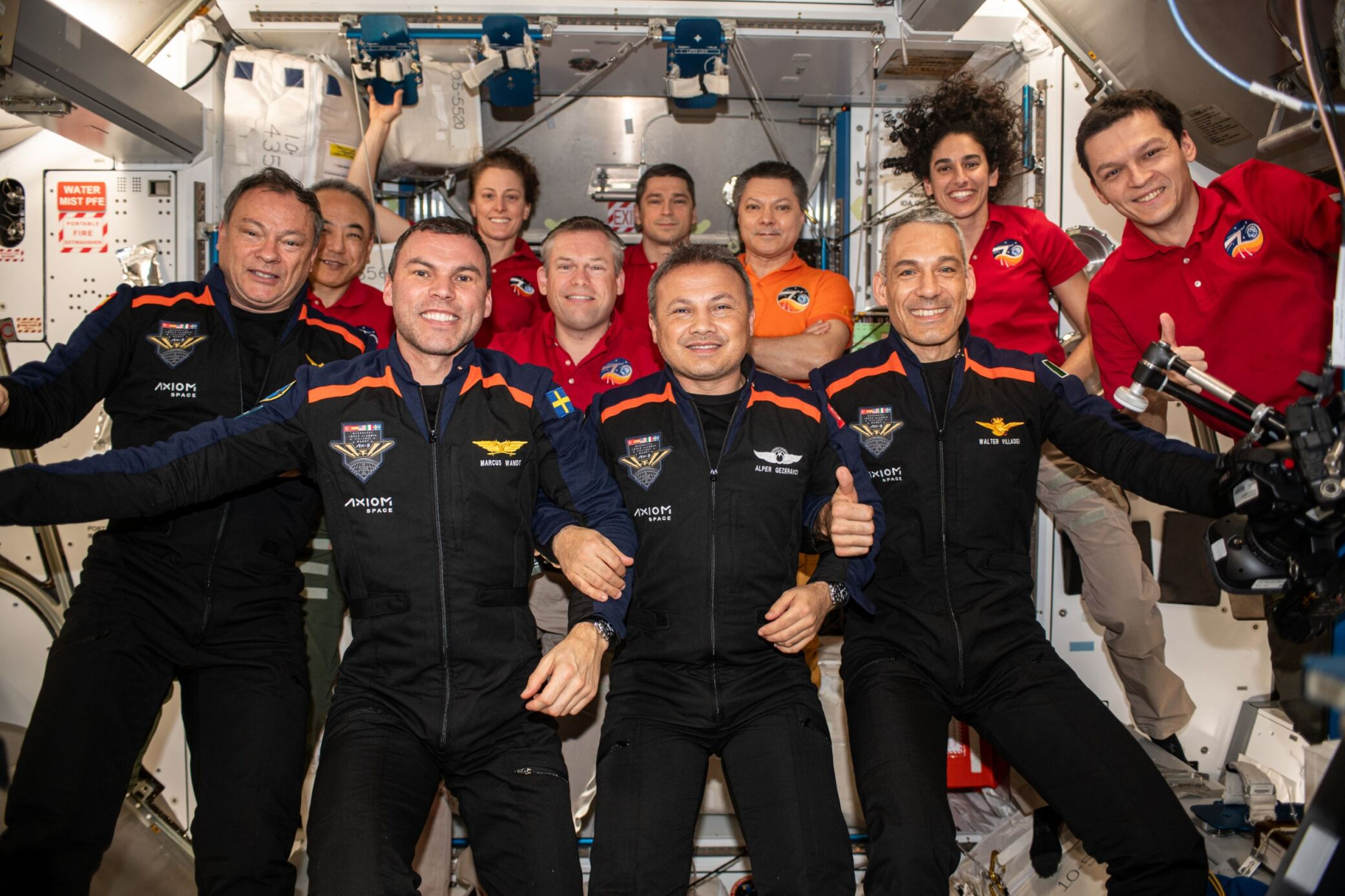
Oleg Kononenko (orange t-shirt) along with his other Expedition 70 crew members (red t-shirts) and Axiom Mission 3 crew (black jumpsuits)

Expedition 70 was the 70th long-duration expedition to the International Space Station. The expedition began with the departure of Soyuz MS-23 on 27 September 2023 with Danish astronaut Andreas Mogensen taking over the ISS command. It ended with the departure of Soyuz MS-24 on 6 April 2024.

== Background, Crew and Events ==
Initially, the expedition consisted of Andreas and his three SpaceX Crew-7 crewmates, Jasmin Moghbeli, Satoshi Furukawa, and Konstantin Borisov from America, Japan, and Russia respectively, as well as Russian cosmonauts Oleg Kononenko (who later assumed the ISS command) and Nikolai Chub (both on a year long ISS mission), and another American astronaut Loral O'Hara, who launched aboard Soyuz MS-24 on September 15, 2023 and were transferred from Expedition 69 alongside the SpaceX Crew-7 astronauts.

However, even after several months of outfitting EVAs and RTOd heat radiator installation, six months later on 9 October 2023, the Nauka RTOd radiator malfunctioned before active use of Nauka (the purpose of RTOd installation is to radiate heat from Nauka experiments). The malfunction, a leak, rendered the RTOd radiator unusable for Nauka. This is the third ISS radiator leak after Soyuz MS-22 and Progress MS-21 radiator leaks. If a spare RTOd is not available, Nauka experiments will have to rely on Nauka's main launch radiator and the module could never be utilized to its full capacity.

The crew was later replenished by subsequent crew rotation missions in the expedition, SpaceX Crew-8, consisting of American astronauts Matthew Dominick, Michael Barratt, and Jeanette Epps, and Russian cosmonaut Alexander Grebenkin, and Soyuz MS-25, consisting of Russian cosmonaut Oleg Novitsky, Belarusian space tourist Marina Vasilevskaya, and American astronaut Tracy Caldwell-Dyson. Originally, the Boeing Starliner Crewed Flight Test was supposed to dock during the expedition. Instead, it was again moved farther down the vehicle schedule to May during Expedition 71. The space station was also visited by a non-expedition crew, Axiom Mission 3, consisting of former NASA astronaut Michael López-Alegría (who previously commanded the station during Expedition 14), Italian astronaut Walter Villadei, ESA Swedish Project astronaut Marcus Wandt, and Turkish astronaut Alper Gezeravcı.

== Events manifest ==
Events involving crewed spacecraft are listed in bold.

Previous mission: Expedition 69

- 27 September 2023 – **Soyuz MS-23 undocking, official switch from Expedition 69**
- 9 October 2023 – Nauka outfitting RtoD Add-on Heat Radiator Leak Event
- 25/26 October 2023 – EVA 1 (VKD-61) Kononenko/Chub: 7 hrs, 41 mins
- 1 November 2023 – EVA 2 (US-89) Moghbeli/O'Hara: 6 hrs, 42 mins
- 11 November 2023 – CRS SpX-29 docking
- 29 November 2023 – Progress MS-23/84P undocking
- 3 December 2023 – Progress MS-25/86P docking
- 21 December 2023 – CRS SpX-29 undocking
- 22 December 2023 – CRS NG-19 unberthing and release
- 20 January 2024 – **Axiom Mission 3 docking (non-Expedition crew)**
- 1 February 2024 – CRS Cygnus NG-20 capture and berthing
- 7 February 2024 – **Axiom Mission 3 undocking (non-Expedition crew)**
- 13 February 2024 – Progress MS-24/85P undocking
- 17 February 2024 – Progress MS-26/87P docking
- 5 March 2024 – **SpaceX Crew-8 docking**
- 10 March 2024 – ISS Expedition 70 change of command ceremony from Andreas Mogensen to Oleg Kononenko
- 11 March 2024 – **SpaceX Crew-7 undocking**
- 23 March 2024 – CRS SpX-30 docking
- 25 March 2024 – **Soyuz MS-25 docking (Expedition 70/71 & ISS EP-21)**
- 29 March 2024 – Kononenko and Chub's seat liner from Soyuz MS-24 swapped with Novitsky and Vasilevskaya's seat liner from Soyuz MS-25 for MS-24 landing
- 6 April 2024 – **Soyuz MS-24 undocking, official switch to Expedition 71**

Next: Expedition 71

== Crew ==
Flight	Astronaut	Increment 70a	Increment 70b	Increment 70c	Increment 70d
Flight	Astronaut	27 Sep 2023 - 5 Mar 2024	5 - 11 Mar 2024	11 - 25 Mar 2024	25 Mar - 6 Apr 2024
Soyuz MS-24	Oleg Kononenko, Roscosmos; Fifth spaceflight	Flight engineer		Commander	
Soyuz MS-24	Nikolai Chub, Roscosmos; First spaceflight	Flight engineer			
Soyuz MS-24	Loral O'Hara, NASA; First spaceflight	Flight engineer			
SpaceX Crew-7	Jasmin Moghbeli, NASA; First spaceflight	Flight engineer		Off station	
SpaceX Crew-7	Andreas Mogensen, ESA; Second spaceflight	Commander		Off station	
SpaceX Crew-7	Satoshi Furukawa, JAXA; Second and last spaceflight	Flight engineer		Off station	
SpaceX Crew-7	Konstantin Borisov, Roscosmos; First spaceflight	Flight engineer		Off station	
SpaceX Crew-8	Matthew Dominick, NASA; First spaceflight	Off station	Flight engineer		
SpaceX Crew-8	Michael Barratt, NASA; Third spaceflight	Off station	Flight engineer		
SpaceX Crew-8	Jeanette Epps, NASA; Only spaceflight	Off station	Flight engineer		
SpaceX Crew-8	Alexander Grebenkin, Roscosmos; First spaceflight	Off station	Flight engineer		
Soyuz MS-25	Tracy Caldwell-Dyson, NASA; Third spaceflight	Off station			Flight engineer

Besides the expedition crew, Crew Dragon visited the station, carrying Axiom Mission 3, consisting of Michael López-Alegría of Axiom Space (formerly NASA), Walter Villadei of the Italian Ministry of Defence, Alper Gezeravcı of the Turkish Space Agency, and Marcus Wandt of the Swedish National Space Agency.

The Soyuz MS-25 vehicle carried expedition member Tracy Caldwell-Dyson and visitors Oleg Novitsky of Roscosmos and Marina Vasilevskaya, a flight attendant trained by the Belarus Space Agency for ISS EP-21. One week after docking, Novitsky and Vasilevskaya returned with expedition member Loral O'Hara on the Soyuz MS-24 vehicle. Meanwhile, Kononenko and Chub, who launched on MS-24, returned on the MS-25 vehicle.

== Vehicle manifest ==
For the first time, during 25 March–6 April 2024, all seven currently active ports of ISS were occupied.

Vehicle	Purpose	Port	Docking/capture date	Undocking date
Vehicles inherited from Expedition 69
Progress MS-23/84P	Cargo	Poisk zenith	24 May 2023	29 Nov 2023
CRS NG-19	Cargo	Unity nadir	4 Aug 2023	22 Dec 2023
Progress MS-24/85P	Cargo	Zvezda aft	25 Aug 2023	13 Feb 2024
SpaceX Crew-7 "Endurance"	Exp. 69/70 crew	Harmony zenith	27 Aug 2023	11 Mar 2024
Soyuz MS-24/70S "Antares"	Exp. 69/70 crew	Rassvet nadir	15 Sep 2023	6 Apr 2024
Vehicles docked during Expedition 70
CRS SpX-29	Cargo	Harmony forward	11 Nov 2023	21 Dec 2023
Progress MS-25/86P	Cargo	Poisk zenith	3 Dec 2023	28 May 2024 (Exp. 71)
Ax-3 "Freedom"	Visiting commercial mission	Harmony forward	20 Jan 2024	7 Feb 2024
CRS NG-20	Cargo	Unity nadir	1 Feb 2024	12 Jul 2024 (Exp. 71)
Progress MS-26/87P	Cargo	Zvezda aft	17 Feb 2024	13 Aug 2024 (Exp. 71)
SpaceX Crew-8 "Endeavour"	Exp. 70/71/72 crew	Harmony forward	5 Mar 2024	2 May 2024 (Exp. 71; redock)
SpaceX Crew-8 "Endeavour"	Exp. 70/71/72 crew	Harmony zenith	2 May 2024 (Exp. 71; redock)	23 Oct 2024 (Exp. 72)
CRS SpX-30	Cargo	Harmony zenith	23 Mar 2024	28 Apr 2024 (Exp. 71)
Soyuz MS-25/71S "Kazbek"	Exp. 70/71 crew, Visiting Expedition 21	Prichal nadir	25 Mar 2024	23 Sep 2024 (Exp. 71)

Segment	U.S. Orbital Segment				Russian Orbital Segment			
Period	Harmony forward	Harmony zenith	Harmony nadir	Unity nadir	Rassvet nadir	Prichal nadir	Poisk zenith	Zvezda aft
27 Sep–11 Nov 2023	Vacant	SpaceX Crew-7	Vacant	CRS NG-19	Soyuz MS-24	Vacant	Progress MS-23	Progress MS-24
11–29 Nov 2023	CRS SpX-29	SpaceX Crew-7	Vacant	CRS NG-19	Soyuz MS-24	Vacant	Progress MS-23	Progress MS-24
29 Nov–3 Dec 2023	CRS SpX-29	SpaceX Crew-7	Vacant	CRS NG-19	Soyuz MS-24	Vacant	Vacant	Progress MS-24
3–21 Dec 2023	CRS SpX-29	SpaceX Crew-7	Vacant	CRS NG-19	Soyuz MS-24	Vacant	Progress MS-25	Progress MS-24
21–22 Dec 2023	Vacant	SpaceX Crew-7	Vacant	CRS NG-19	Soyuz MS-24	Vacant	Progress MS-25	Progress MS-24
22 Dec 2023–20 Jan 2024	Vacant	SpaceX Crew-7	Vacant	Vacant	Soyuz MS-24	Vacant	Progress MS-25	Progress MS-24
20 Jan–1 Feb 2024	Ax-3	SpaceX Crew-7	Vacant	Vacant	Soyuz MS-24	Vacant	Progress MS-25	Progress MS-24
1–7 Feb 2024	Ax-3	SpaceX Crew-7	Vacant	CRS NG-20	Soyuz MS-24	Vacant	Progress MS-25	Progress MS-24
7–13 Feb 2024	Vacant	SpaceX Crew-7	Vacant	CRS NG-20	Soyuz MS-24	Vacant	Progress MS-25	Progress MS-24
13–17 Feb 2024	Vacant	SpaceX Crew-7	Vacant	CRS NG-20	Soyuz MS-24	Vacant	Progress MS-25	Vacant
17 Feb–5 Mar 2024	Vacant	SpaceX Crew-7	Vacant	CRS NG-20	Soyuz MS-24	Vacant	Progress MS-25	Progress MS-26
5–11 Mar 2024	SpaceX Crew-8	SpaceX Crew-7	Vacant	CRS NG-20	Soyuz MS-24	Vacant	Progress MS-25	Progress MS-26
11–23 Mar 2024	SpaceX Crew-8	Vacant	Vacant	CRS NG-20	Soyuz MS-24	Vacant	Progress MS-25	Progress MS-26
23–25 Mar 2024	SpaceX Crew-8	CRS SpX-30	Vacant	CRS NG-20	Soyuz MS-24	Vacant	Progress MS-25	Progress MS-26
25 Mar–6 Apr 2024	SpaceX Crew-8	CRS SpX-30	Vacant	CRS NG-20	Soyuz MS-24	Soyuz MS-25	Progress MS-25	Progress MS-26

The Prichal aft, forward, starboard, and aft ports all have yet to be used since the module originally docked to the station and are not included in the table.
