= NASA Astronaut Group 18 =

2000 human spaceflight selection of 17 candidates; "The Bugs"

The Bugs
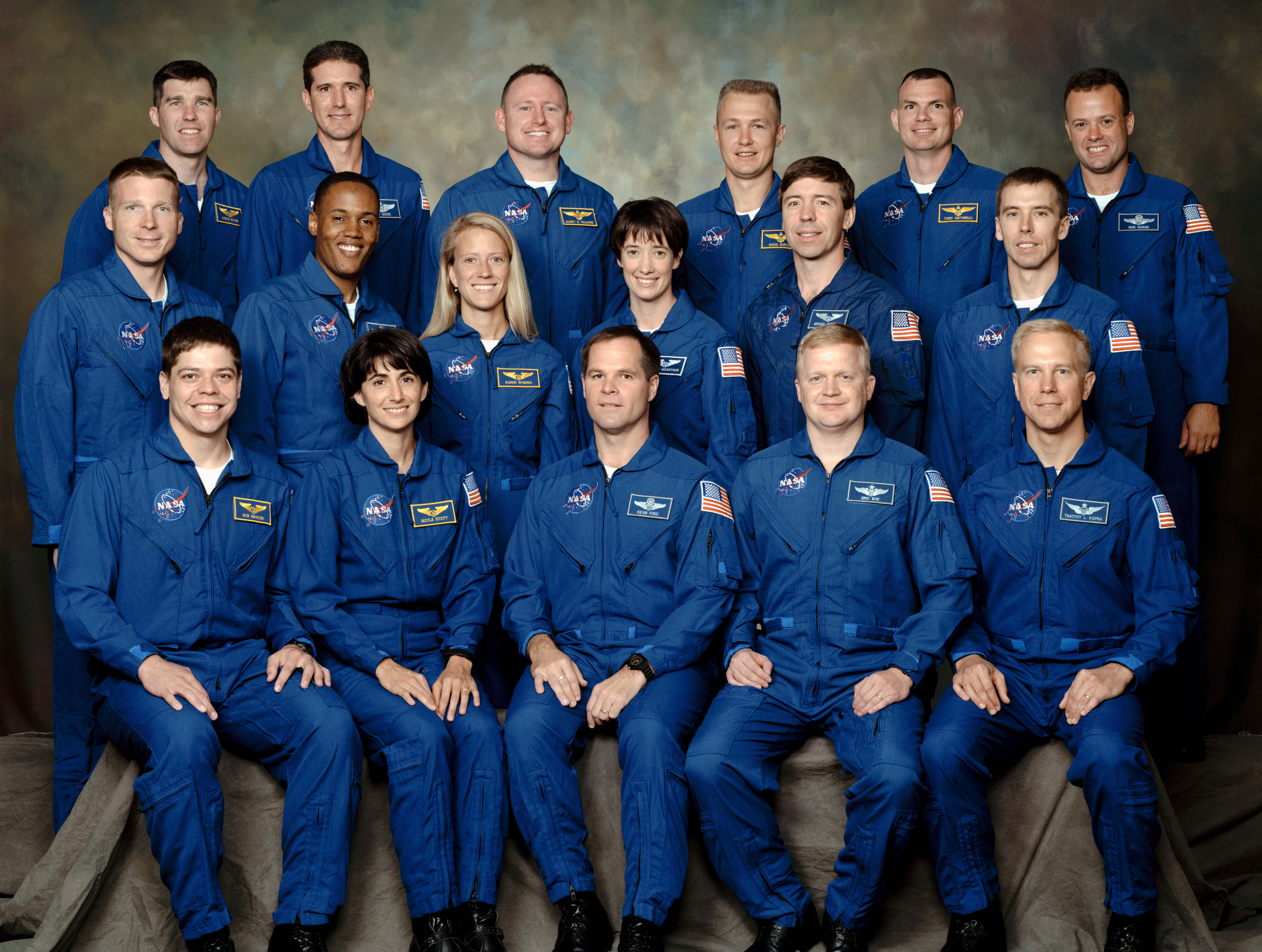
- The astronauts of Group 18
- Year selected: 2000
- Number selected: 17

NASA Astronaut Group 18 (nicknamed "The Bugs"), was a group of 17 astronaut candidates selected by NASA in 2000. The class consisted of seven pilots and ten mission specialists, who began astronaut training in August 2000.

== Pilots ==
- Dominic A. Antonelli (2 flights)
  - Pilot, STS-119 (Discovery)
  - Pilot, STS-132 (Atlantis)
- Eric A. Boe (2 flights)
  - Pilot, STS-126 (Endeavour)
  - Pilot, STS-133 (Discovery)
- Kevin A. Ford (2 flights)
  - Pilot, STS-128 (Discovery)
  - Soyuz TMA-06M
    - Flight engineer, Expedition 33
    - ISS commander, Expedition 34
- Ronald J. Garan, Jr. (2 flights)
  - Mission specialist, STS-124 (Discovery)
  - Soyuz TMA-21
    - Flight engineer, Expedition 27
    - Flight engineer, Expedition 28
- Douglas G. Hurley (3 flights)
  - Pilot, STS-127 (Endeavour)
  - Pilot, STS-135 (Atlantis)
  - Commander, SpaceX Demo-2 (Endeavour)
    - Flight engineer, Expedition 63
- Terry W. Virts, Jr. (2 flights)
  - Pilot, STS-130 (Endeavour)
  - Soyuz TMA-15M
    - Flight engineer, Expedition 42
    - ISS commander, Expedition 43
- Barry E. Wilmore (3 flights)
  - Pilot, STS-129 (Atlantis)
  - Soyuz TMA-14M
    - Flight engineer, Expedition 41
    - ISS commander, Expedition 42
  - Commander, Boeing CFT (Calypso) (Flight up)
  - Mission specialist, SpaceX Crew-9 (Crew Dragon Freedom) (Flight down)
    - Flight engineer, Expedition 71/72

== Mission specialists ==
- Michael R. Barratt (3 flights)
  - Soyuz TMA-14
    - Flight engineer, Expedition 19
    - Flight engineer, Expedition 20
  - Mission specialist, STS-133 (Discovery)
  - Pilot, SpaceX Crew-8 (Endeavour)
    - Flight engineer, Expedition 70
    - Flight engineer, Expedition 71
    - Flight engineer, Expedition 72
- Robert L. Behnken (3 flights)
  - Mission specialist, STS-123 (Endeavour)
  - Mission specialist, STS-130 (Endeavour)
  - Joint operations commander, SpaceX Demo-2 (Endeavour)
    - Flight engineer, Expedition 63
- Stephen G. Bowen (4 flights)
  - Mission specialist, STS-126 (Endeavour)
  - Mission specialist, STS-132 (Atlantis)
  - Mission specialist, STS-133 (Discovery)
  - Commander, SpaceX Crew-6
    - Flight engineer, Expedition 68 / 69
- B. Alvin Drew (2 flights)
  - Mission specialist, STS-118 (Endeavour)
  - Mission specialist, STS-133 (Discovery)
- Andrew J. Feustel (3 flights)
  - NEEMO 9
  - Mission specialist, STS-125 (Atlantis)
  - Mission specialist, STS-134 (Endeavour)
  - Soyuz MS-08
    - Flight engineer, Expedition 55
    - ISS commander, Expedition 56
- Michael T. Good (2 flights)
  - Mission specialist, STS-125 (Atlantis)
  - Mission specialist, STS-132 (Atlantis)
- Timothy L. Kopra (2 flights)
  - NEEMO 11
  - Mission specialist, STS-127 (Endeavour) (Flight up)
    - Flight engineer, Expedition 20
  - Mission specialist, STS-128 (Discovery) (Flight down)
  - Soyuz TMA-19M
    - Flight engineer, Expedition 46
    - ISS commander, Expedition 47
- K. Megan McArthur (2 flights)
  - Mission specialist, STS-125 (Atlantis)
  - Pilot, SpaceX Crew-2
    - Flight engineer, Expedition 65
    - Flight engineer, Expedition 66
- Karen L. Nyberg (2 flights)
  - NEEMO 10
  - Mission specialist, STS-124 (Discovery)
  - Soyuz TMA-09M
    - Flight engineer, Expedition 36
    - Flight engineer, Expedition 37
- Nicole P. Stott (2 flights)
  - NEEMO 9
  - Mission specialist, STS-128 (Discovery)
    - Flight engineer, Expedition 20
    - Flight engineer, Expedition 21
  - Mission specialist, STS-129 (Atlantis)
  - Mission specialist, STS-133 (Discovery)

== See also ==
- List of astronauts by selection
