= Crew Dragon Endeavour =

SpaceX Crew Dragon spacecraft

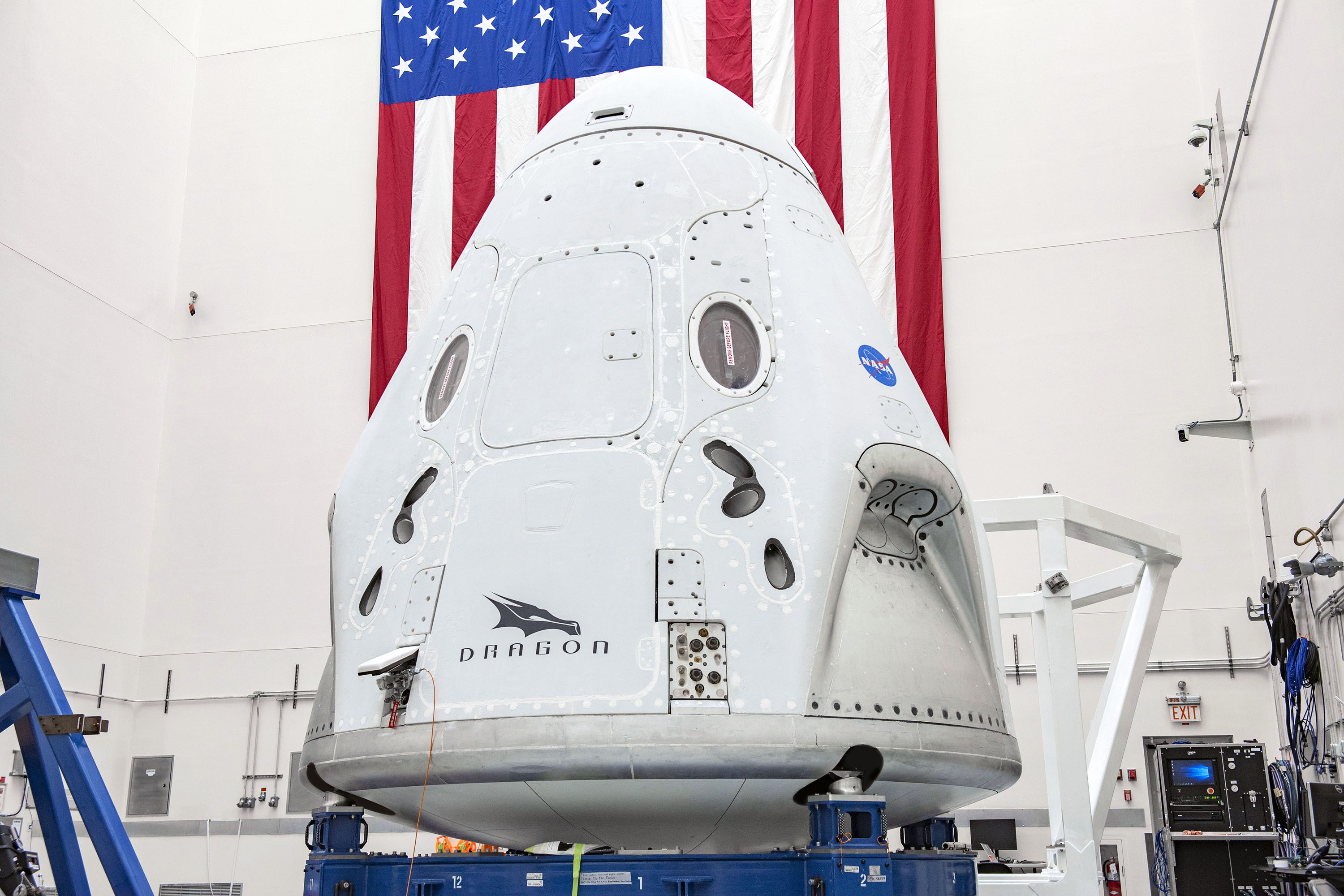
- Endeavour at Cape Canaveral in April 2020
- Type: Space capsule
- Class: Dragon 2
- Eponym: Space Shuttle Endeavour
- Serial no.: C206
- Owner: SpaceX
- Manufacturer: SpaceX

Specifications
- Dimensions: 4.4 m × 3.7 m (14 ft × 12 ft)
- Power: Solar panel
- Rocket: Falcon 9 Block 5

History
- Location: California
- First flight: 30 May–2 August 2020; Demo-2
- Last flight: 1 August 2025-15 January 2026; Crew-11
- Flights: 6
- Flight time: 868 days, 14 hours, and 13 minutes

Dragon 2s

Crew Dragon Endeavour (serial number C206) is the first operational Crew Dragon reusable spacecraft manufactured and operated by SpaceX. The spacecraft is named after Space Shuttle Endeavour. It first launched on 30 May 2020 to the International Space Station (ISS) on the Crew Dragon Demo-2 mission. It has subsequently been used for the SpaceX Crew-2 mission that launched in April 2021, the private Axiom Mission 1 that launched in April 2022, the SpaceX Crew-6 mission that launched in March 2023, the SpaceX Crew-8 mission from early March 2024 to late October 2024, and the SpaceX Crew-11 mission from August 2025 to January 2026. As of November 2024, Endeavour holds the single-mission record for the most time in orbit by an American crewed spacecraft at 236 days.

== First flight: Demo-2 mission ==
=== Change in mission ===
After the success of Crew Dragon Demo-1 using Crew Dragon C204, that spacecraft was originally planned to be used for the Crew Dragon In-Flight Abort Test. However, on 20 April 2019, Crew Dragon C204 was destroyed in an explosion during static fire testing at the Landing Zone 1 facility. On the day of the anomaly, the initial testing of the Crew Dragon's Draco thrusters was successful, with the explosion occurring during the test of the SuperDraco abort system.

Crew Dragon C205, then slated to be used for the Demo-2 mission, was subsequently used for the in-flight abort test. Crew Dragon C206 Endeavour, then, was assigned to the Demo-2 mission, replacing Crew Dragon C205. According to SpaceX, Endeavour underwent electromagnetic interference testing and completed acoustic testing in February 2020. On 13 February 2020, the spacecraft was in SpaceX's processing facility at Cape Canaveral Space Force Station, Florida to undergo final processing and testing in preparation for the Demo-2 launch.

On 17 April 2020, NASA announced the Demo-2 launch date was scheduled for no-earlier-than 27 May 2020. NASA's Aerospace Safety Advisory Panel (ASAP), on 23 April 2024, gave its approval for the late May launch saying it was feasible and safe. Endeavour was transported to the Kennedy Space Center, arriving at SpaceX's horizontal integration facility (HIF) at Launch Complex 39A on 15 May 2020. The spacecraft was then mated to a Falcon 9 rocket and was rolled out onto the launch pad on 21 May 2020, with a static fire test completed the next day.

SpaceX's first reused Crew Dragon Endeavour docks at International Space Station.

=== May 2020 launch ===
Astronauts Bob Behnken and Doug Hurley were selected by NASA as the Demo-2 mission crew on 3 August 2018. Their mission validated crewed spaceflight operations using SpaceX hardware, including the Dragon spacecraft, the Falcon 9 rocket. SpaceX scrubbed Demo-2's first launch attempt because of weather conditions. The Demo-2 mission successfully launched on 30 May 2020. Hurley and Behnken's launch was the first to carry a crew to the International Space Station from the United States since STS-135 in July 2011.

In a video tour of the spacecraft, shortly after the launch, Behnken and Hurley revealed they named the capsule Endeavour after the Space Shuttle Endeavour. They both flew their first space missions on Space Shuttle Endeavour, on missions STS-123 and STS-127, respectively. Additionally, each crew member brought along a toy from their family, in this case an Apatosaurus dinosaur named "Tremor", a sequined plush dinosaur toy, and a Ty flippables plush toy, continuing the tradition for astronauts to bring a plush toy or trinket aboard their spacecraft to serve as a zero-gravity indicator when weightlessness kicks in during spaceflight.

=== Station operations ===
Spending 19 hours in orbit approaching the ISS, Hurley demonstrated the ability to pilot the spacecraft via its touchscreen controls; upon reaching a distance of 220 metres (720 ft) from the ISS docking ports, he let the automated docking program take over. Endeavour docked with the ISS on 31 May 2020. Hurley and Behnken joined the ISS Expedition 63 crew, which consisted of NASA astronaut Chris Cassidy and Russian cosmonauts Ivan Vagner and Anatoli Ivanishin. Behnken and Hurley launched to the ISS for an indeterminate time frame, which depended on Endeavour's solar array degradation, the status of Crew Dragon Resilience, and landing zone weather.

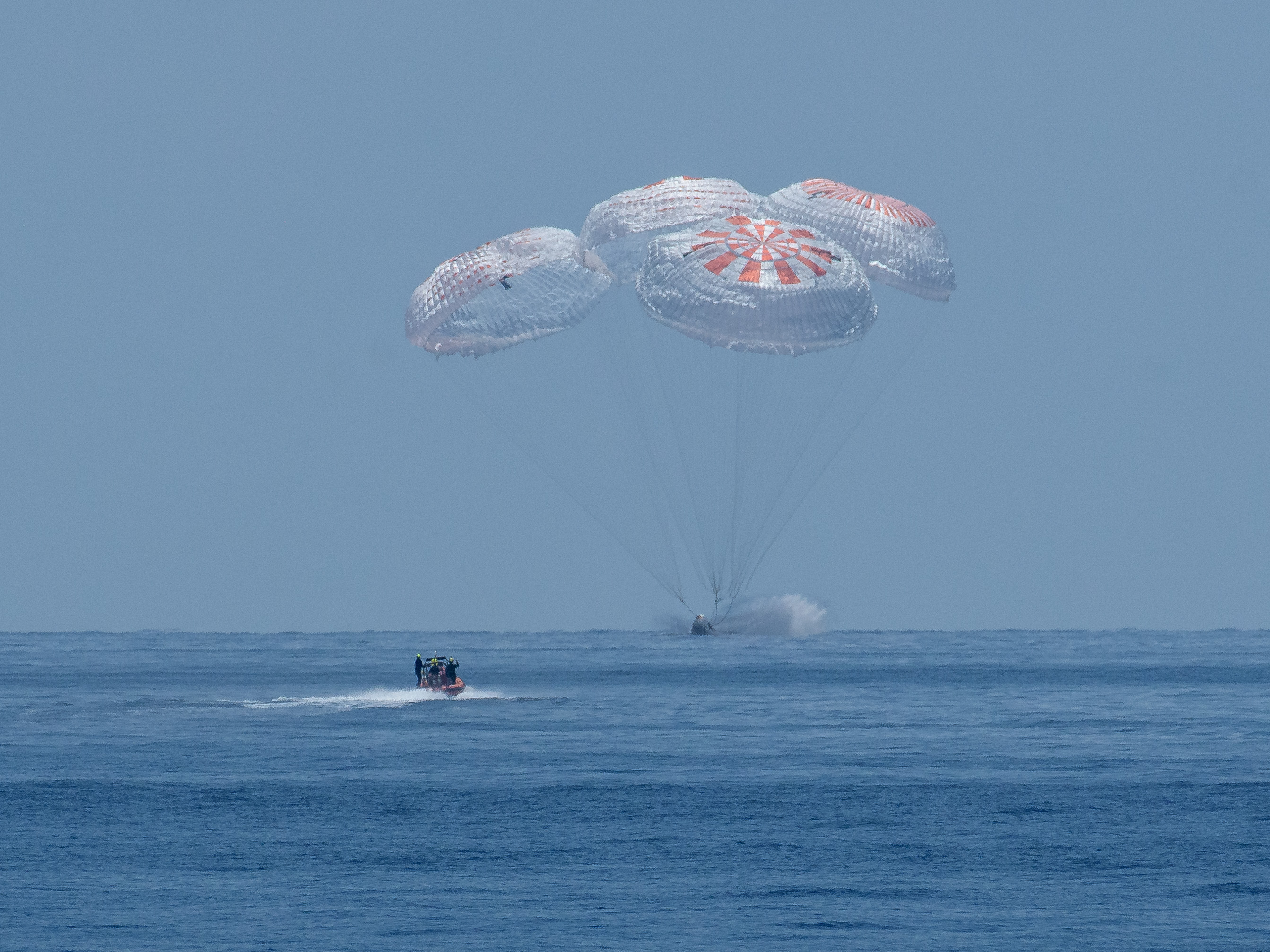
Crew Dragon Endeavour landing in the Gulf of Mexico on 2 August 2020

NASA originally planned Demo-2 as a short test flight lasting about two weeks, but later chose to extend the mission to address the shortfall of crew in the ISS. According to Ken Bowersox, acting administrator for NASA's human spaceflight program, the spacecraft was "doing very well" and NASA re-planned to bring the crew and Endeavour home in early August.

=== First splashdown in the Gulf ===
When Endeavour returned on 2 August 2020, it journeyed through a fast fiery descent of Earth's atmosphere and was slowed down by the capsule's drogue chute and suite of parachutes. It splashed down in the Gulf of Mexico, near Pensacola, Florida, where a SpaceX recovery ship GO Navigator brought the crew and spacecraft back to shore. This mission was the first ocean-based recovery of an American crewed spacecraft since 1975, when the Apollo-Soyuz Test Project mission splashed down. Also, this mission was the first crew recovery to occur in the Gulf of Mexico.

On the Demo-2 mission, Endeavour was in space for 63 days. The spacecraft was rated to spend 119 days in orbit, as its solar panels had less capability than a full production Crew Dragon capable of staying in space for up to 210 days.

During the mission, NASA gave SpaceX approval to reuse flight-proven Crew Dragon spacecraft. Behnken and Hurley left a Demo-2 patch on the inside of Endeavour after their mission. SpaceX Crew-2 mission commander, astronaut Shane Kimbrough, announced that the crew would keep the Endeavour name for the spacecraft. The seat Behnken used during his mission was later used by his wife, K. Megan McArthur on the Crew-2 flight.

== Crew-8 in-space record ==
Endeavour's fourth operational mission was SpaceX Crew-8. It launched on 3 March 2024 (local time) and returned to Earth on 25 October 2024. One of the crew members, mission specialist Jeanette Epps, became the second African-American woman to be part of a long-duration mission onboard the ISS. The mission spent extra time in space due to an unexpected need to support Boeing Crew Flight Test mission astronauts Sunita Williams and Butch Wilmore after problems with their spacecraft. Weather in the landing zones, including Hurricane Milton, then caused further delays, but the crew finally splashed down off of the coast of Pensacola, Florida on 25 October 2024. Endeavour now holds the single-mission record for the most time in orbit by an American human-rated spacecraft at 236 days and the overall cumulative total time record at 702 days in space.

== Flights ==
List includes only completed or currently manifested missions. Dates are listed in Coordinated Universal Time (UTC). For future events, they are listed as the earliest possible opportunities – which is also known as no-earlier-than (NET) dates – and may change.

Flight No.	Mission and Patch	Launch	Landing	Duration	Remarks	Crew	Outcome
1	Demo-2	30 May 2020, 19:22:45	2 August 2020, 18:48:06	63 days, 23 hours, 25 minutes	First crewed flight test of Dragon 2. The mission was extended from two weeks to nine, to allow the crew to bolster activity on the ISS ahead of Crew-1.	Doug Hurley; Bob Behnken	Success
2	Crew-2	23 April 2021, 09:49:02	9 November 2021, 03:33:15	199 days, 17 hours, 44 minutes	First reuse of a crewed space capsule and first reuse of a Falcon 9 booster. Long-duration mission. Ferried four Expedition 65/66 crew members to the ISS.	Shane Kimbrough; Megan McArthur; Akihiko Hoshide; Thomas Pesquet	Success
3	Axiom-1 (patch)	8 April 2022, 15:17:12	25 April 2022, 17:06:23	17 days, 1 hour, 49 minutes	First fully private flight to the ISS. Contracted by Axiom Space. Axiom employee served as commander with three paying tourists.	Michael López-Alegría; Larry Connor; Mark Pathy; Eytan Stibbe	Success
4	Crew-6	2 March 2023, 05:34:14	4 September 2023, 04:17:23	185 days, 22 hours, 43 minutes	Long-duration mission. Ferried four Expedition 68/69 crew members to the ISS.	Stephen Bowen; Warren Hoburg; Sultan Al Neyadi; Andrey Fedyaev	Success
5	Crew-8	4 March 2024, 3:53:38	25 October 2024, 07:29:02	235 days, 3 hours, 35 minutes	Ferried four Expedition 70/71/72 crew members to the ISS. ISS stay extended and two makeshift seats added to allow spacecraft to serve as "lifeboat" for Boeing CFT crew if needed.	Matthew Dominick; Michael Barratt; Jeanette Epps; Alexander Grebenkin	Success
6	Crew-11	1 August 2025, 15:43:42	15 January 2026; 08:41:36	166 days, 16 hours and 57 minutes	Long-duration mission. Ferried four Expedition 73/74 crew members to the ISS. Final Crew Dragon launch from LC-39A. Mission returned a month earlier than planned due to an undisclosed medical condition of a crew member.	Zena Cardman; Michael Fincke; Kimiya Yui; Oleg Platonov	Success
