= Progress MS-23 =

2023 Russian resupply spaceflight to the ISS

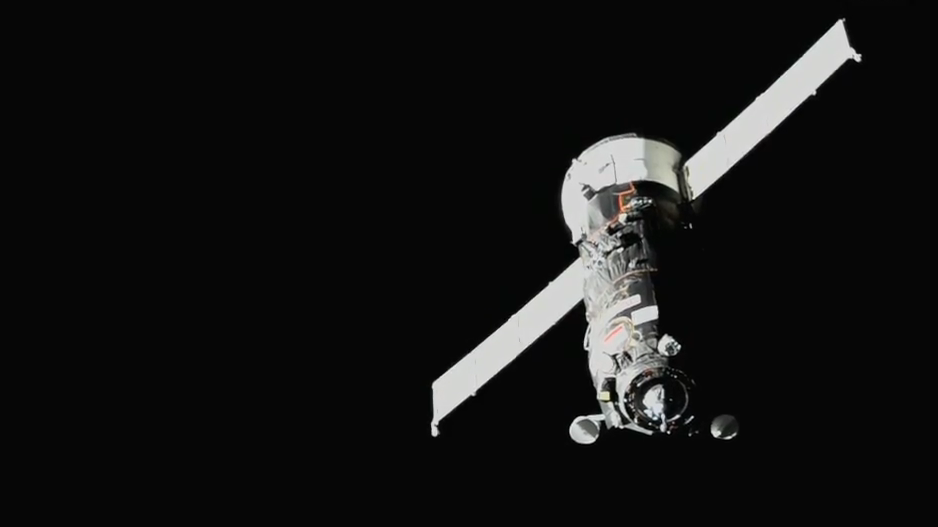
- Progress MS-23 approaching the ISS
- Names: Progress 84P
- Mission type: ISS resupply
- Operator: Roscosmos
- COSPAR ID: 2023-071A
- SATCAT no.: 56740
- Mission duration: 188 days, 22 hours and 6 minutes

Spacecraft properties
- Spacecraft: Progress MS-23 no.453
- Spacecraft type: Progress MS
- Manufacturer: Energia
- Launch mass: 7000 kg

Start of mission
- Launch date: 24 May 2023, 12:56 UTC
- Rocket: Soyuz-2.1a
- Launch site: Baikonur, Site 31/6
- Contractor: RKTs Progress

End of mission
- Disposal: Deorbited
- Decay date: 29 November 2023, 11:02 UTC

Orbital parameters
- Reference system: Geocentric orbit
- Regime: Low Earth orbit
- Inclination: 51.65°

Docking with ISS
- Docking port: Poisk zenith
- Docking date: 24 May 2023, 16:19 UTC
- Undocking date: 29 November 2023, 07:55 UTC
- Time docked: 188 days, 15 hours and 36 minutes

Progress MS-23 (Russian: Прогресс МC-23), Russian production No.453, identified by NASA as Progress 84P, was a Progress spaceflight launched by Roscosmos to resupply the International Space Station (ISS). It was the 176th flight of a Progress spacecraft.

== Launch ==
A Soyuz-2.1a with Progress MS-23 to the International Space Station from Baikonur Site 31 launched on 24 May 2023 at 12:56 UTC supporting Expedition 69 and Expedition 70 missions aboard the ISS. It docked the same day.

== Cargo ==
The MS-23 cargo capacity is approximately 2,500 kg (5,500 lb) as follows:

- Dry cargo: 1,290 kg (2,840 lb)
- Fuel: 499 kg (1,100 lb)–600 kg (1,300 lb)
- Oxygen: 40 kg (88 lb)
- Water: 630 kg (1,390 lb)

== See also ==
- Uncrewed spaceflights to the International Space Station
