= Andrey Fedyaev =

Russian cosmonaut (born 1981)

- Андрей Федяев
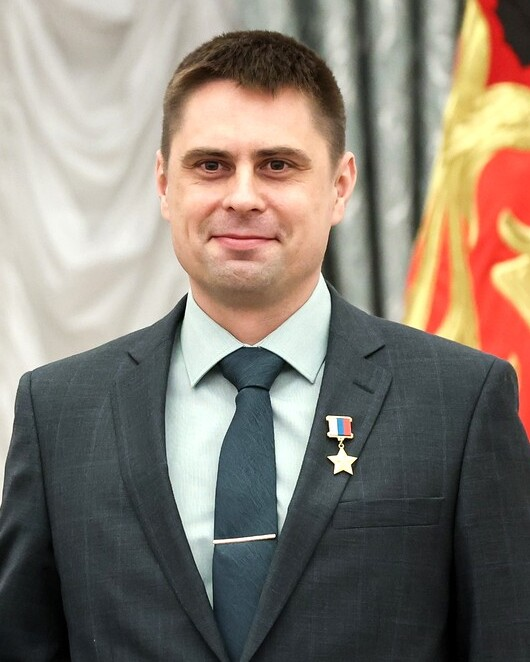
- Fedyaev in 2024
- Born: 26 February 1981 (age 45); Serov, Sverdlovsk Oblast, Russian SFSR, USSR
- Space career

Roscosmos cosmonaut
- Current occupation: Test cosmonaut
- Status: Active
- Rank: Major, Russian Air Force
- Time in space: 423 days, 4 hours, and 1 minute
- Selection: TsPK 2012 Cosmonaut Group
- Missions: SpaceX Crew-6 (Expedition 68/69); SpaceX Crew-12 (Expedition 74/75)
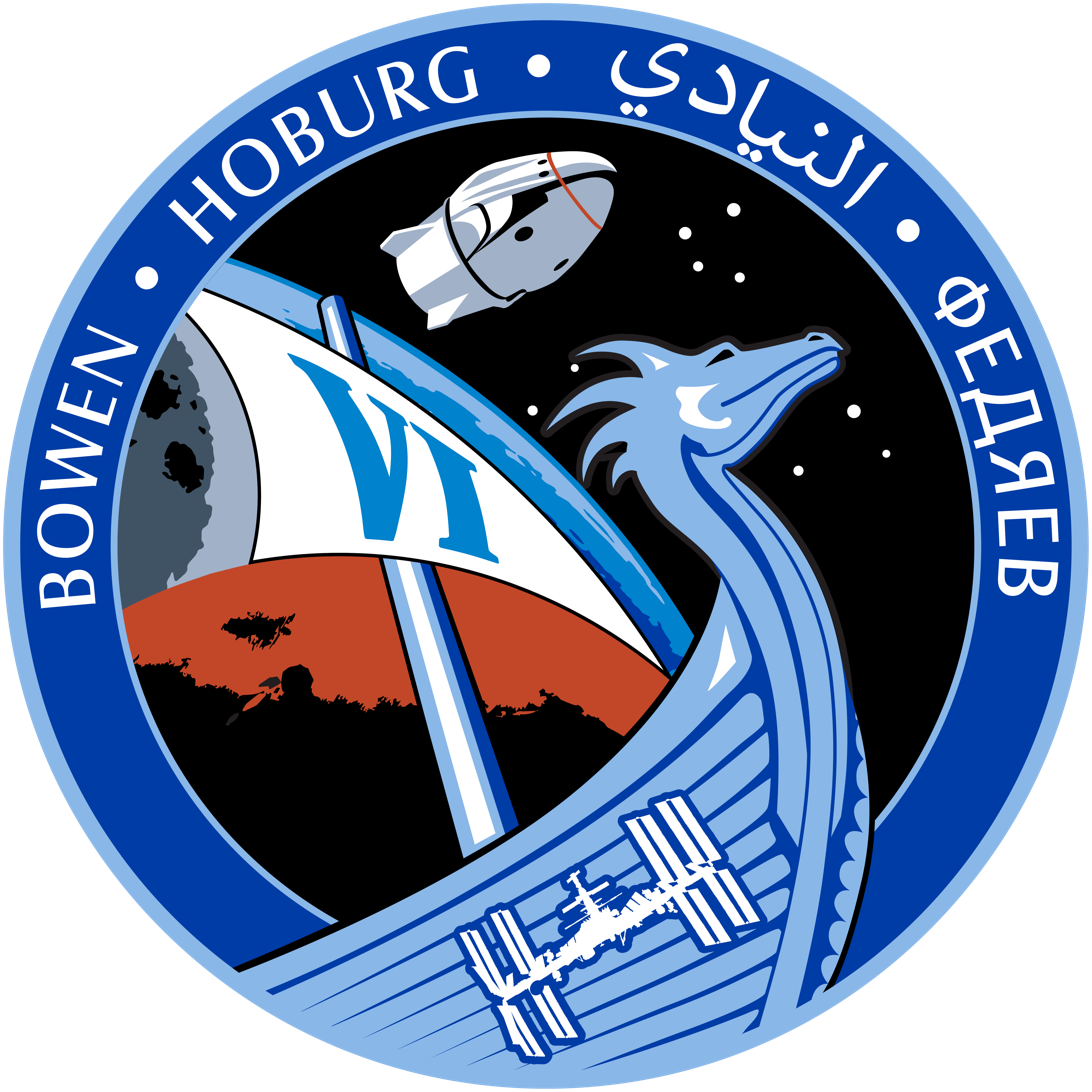
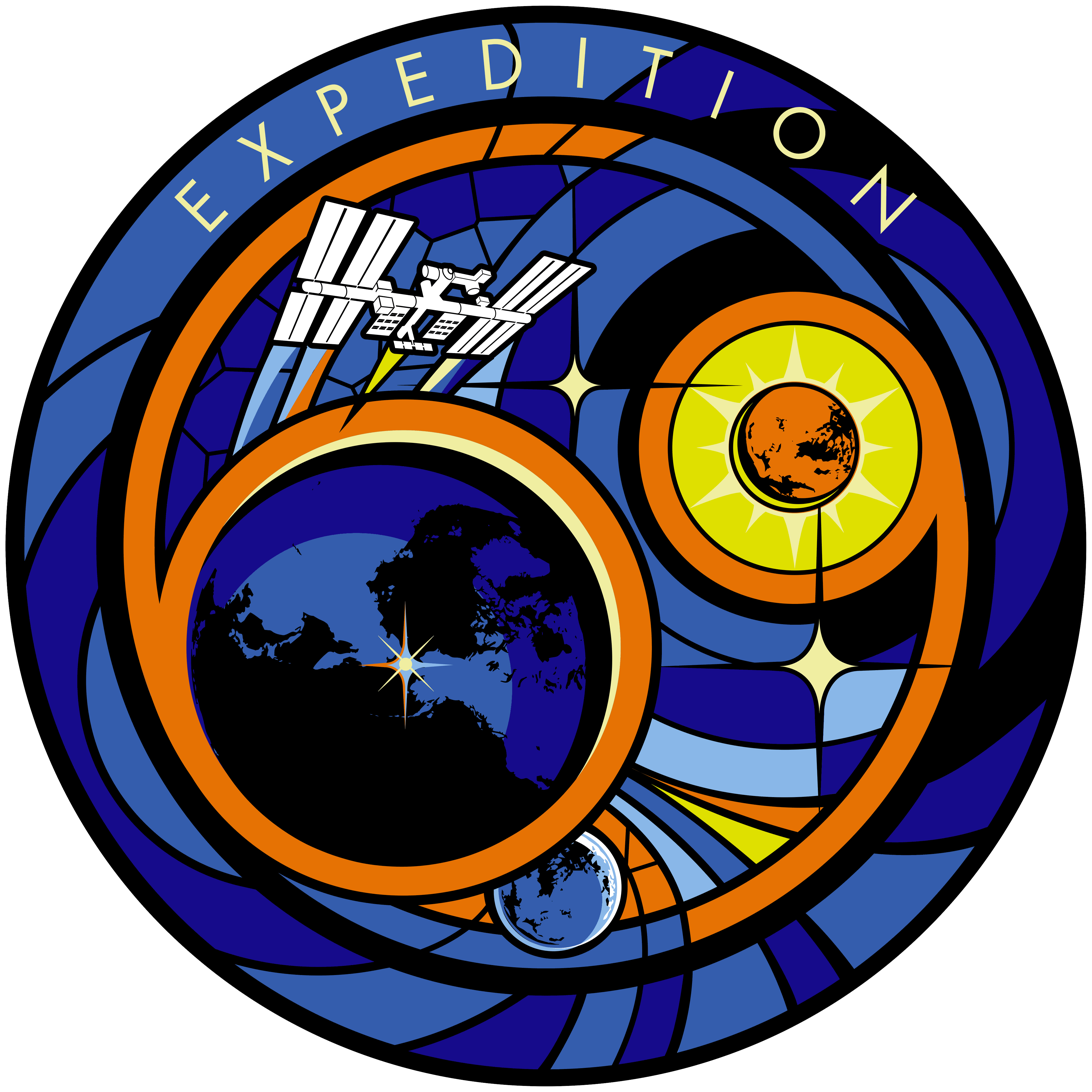
- Mission insignia

Andrey Valerievich Fedyaev (Russian: Андрей Валерьевич Федяев; born February 26, 1981) is a Russian cosmonaut.

== Biography ==
Fedyaev received an engineering degree in air transport and Air Traffic Control from the Balashov Military Aviation School in 2004. Following graduation, Fedyaev joined the Russian Air Force in the 317th mixed aviation segment. He obtained the rank of major before his retirement in 2013. He logged over 500 hours in Russian aircraft.

Fedyaev was selected as a cosmonaut in 2012. He reported to the Gagarin Cosmonaut Training Center in 2012 and was named a test cosmonaut on June 16, 2014.

On July 15, 2022, he was assigned to the SpaceX Crew-6 mission after a recent crew swap agreement between NASA and Roscosmos. The mission launched on March 2, 2023, at 5:34 UTC. He was one of the mission specialists, along with the Emirati astronaut Sultan Al Neyadi.

== Flights ==
On March 2, 2023, at 5:34 UTC, he launched from Kennedy Space Center (NASA) pad 39A in Florida as part of the crew of the SpaceX Crew-6 mission on SpaceX's private reusable American Crew Dragon spacecraft using a Falcon 9 heavy-lift launch vehicle to the International Space Station. He became a participant of Expedition 68/69 and the second Russian cosmonaut to fly on Crew Dragon.

On April 19, 2023, when Roscosmos cosmonauts Sergey Prokopyev and Dmitry Petelin went into space to transfer the radiator needed to remove thermal loads from the MLM to the multipurpose laboratory module (MLM) Nauka, and on May 3-4, 2023, when the airlock was transferred and installed on the MLM Nauka, Andrey Fedyaev controlled the ERA manipulator from the station.

On May 6, 2023, Fedyaev, as part of the Crew-6 mission crew, participated in the redocking of the Crew Dragon spacecraft from the upper node of the Harmony module of the US segment of the ISS to the forward node of the same module.

On February 13, 2026, Fedyaev flew again as a part of the SpaceX Crew-12 mission to the International Space Station for Expedition 74/75. The mission launched from Cape Canaveral Space Launch Complex 40.
