= Stephen Bowen (astronaut) =

American astronaut (born 1964)

Steve Bowen
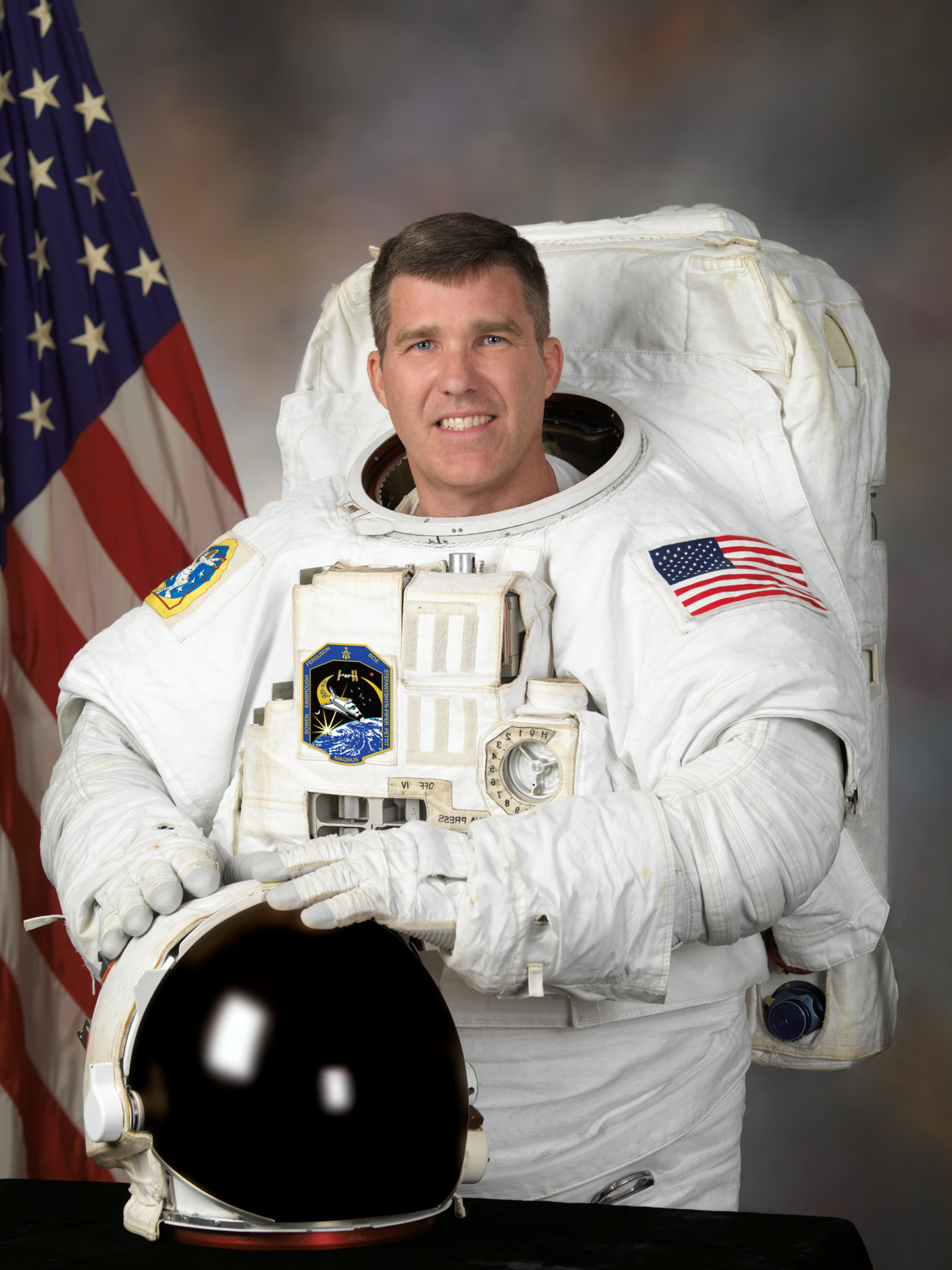
- Bowen in April 2008
- Born: Stephen Gerard Bowen; February 13, 1964 (age 62); Cohasset, Massachusetts, U.S.
- Education: United States Naval Academy (BS); Massachusetts Institute of Technology (MS)
- Space career

NASA astronaut
- Rank: Captain, USN
- Time in space: 226d 8h 43m
- Selection: NASA Group 18 (2000)
- Total EVAs: 10
- Total EVA time: 65h 57m
- Missions: STS-126; STS-132; STS-133; SpaceX Crew-6 (Expedition 68/69)
- Mission insignia

Stephen Gerard Bowen (born February 13, 1964) is a United States Navy submariner and a NASA astronaut; he was the second submariner to travel into space. Bowen has been on four spaceflights, the first three of which were Space Shuttle missions to the International Space Station. His first mission, STS-126, took place in November 2008, and his second was STS-132 in May 2010. His third was STS-133 in February 2011, and his fourth was SpaceX Crew-6 in March 2023.

In March 2011, Bowen completed his third spaceflight as a mission specialist on STS-133, which was Space Shuttle Discovery's final planned flight. Having flown on both STS-132 and STS-133, he became the first and only astronaut to fly on consecutive shuttle missions. Originally Tim Kopra was scheduled to fly on STS-133, but had a bicycle injury shortly before the mission, and so he was replaced by Bowen. On December 16, 2021, NASA assigned Bowen as commander of SpaceX Crew-6 mission to the ISS, launched in March 2023.

== Personal life and early education ==
Bowen resides in Friendswood, Texas. He is married to Deborah Alden; they have three children. He graduated from Cohasset High School, Cohasset, Massachusetts in 1982, received a Bachelor of Science degree in electrical engineering from the United States Naval Academy in 1986 and received a Master of Science degree in ocean engineering from the Massachusetts Institute of Technology in 1993. He is a member of Tau Beta Pi, Phi Kappa Phi and Sigma Pi Sigma. In his spare time, Stephen Bowen has also had connections with the organisation ISSET, through him being the resident astronaut during a few of their Mission Discovery programs. Here he shares his experiences with students as well as try to teach them new skills and influence them to maybe follow a career in the sciences.

== Military career ==
Upon completion of the submarine training pipeline, Bowen spent three years attached to USS Parche and completed qualification in submarines on USS Pogy. After attending the MIT/WHOI Joint Program in Ocean Engineering he reported to USS Augusta for duty as the Engineering Officer. During this tour, he qualified for command of nuclear powered submarines. In 1997, he reported to the United States Special Operations Command (USSOCOM) in the Office of Plans and Policy and worked on the USSOCOM Future Concepts Working Group. For nine months in 1999, he was the Reactor and Propulsion inspector for the Navy's Submarine Board of Inspection and Survey (INSURV). In May 2000 he became the first Executive Officer of the Pre-Commissioning Unit Virginia, the first of the new Virginia-class submarines.

== NASA career ==
Bowen is the first Submarine Officer selected by NASA. He was selected as an astronaut candidate in July 2000, as one of NASA's Astronaut Group 18. He reported for training at the Johnson Space Center in August 2000. Following the completion of two years of training and evaluation, he was initially assigned technical duties in the Astronaut Office Station Operations Branch while awaiting assignment to a Shuttle flight as a mission specialist. Bowen was originally assigned to STS-124 but was moved to a later flight to allow the Shuttle to rotate an ISS crew member.

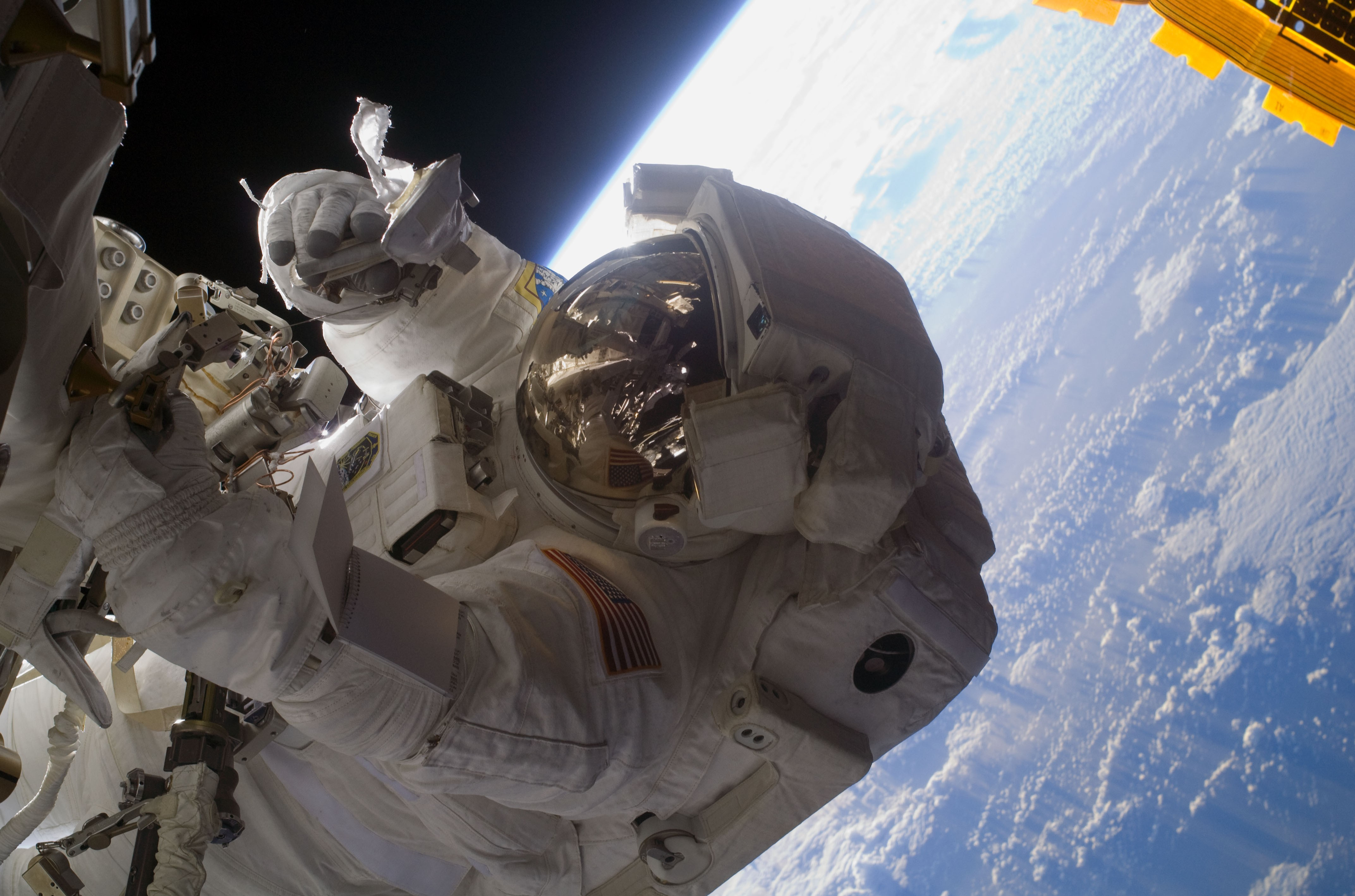
Bowen participating in the third EVA of STS-126.

=== STS-126 ===
Bowen was then assigned to the crew of STS-126, aboard Space Shuttle Endeavour, which launched November 14, 2008, to the International Space Station. STS-126 carried a reusable logistics module that held supplies and equipment, including additional crew quarters, exercise apparatus, equipment for the regenerative life support system, and spare hardware.

During STS-126, Bowen participated in three spacewalks, for a total time of 19 hours, 56 minutes.

=== STS-132 ===
Bowen's next mission was STS-132, aboard Space Shuttle Atlantis, which launched on May 14, 2010, to the ISS. While docked to the station, Bowen conducted two spacewalks and logged 14 hours and 34 minutes of EVA time.

=== STS-133 ===
On January 19, 2011, Bowen was named as the replacement for Timothy L. Kopra on STS-133. Kopra was injured in a bicycle accident, preventing him from flying on the mission. With this mission, Bowen became the first and only astronaut to fly on consecutive Shuttle missions. George Nelson was the first astronaut to fly consecutive Space Shuttle missions in which the Shuttle landed successfully (STS-61-C and STS-26), having the Space Shuttle Challenger disaster between his missions. Bowen conducted two spacewalks and logged 12 hours and 48 minutes of EVA time.

=== SpaceX Crew-6 ===
On December 16, 2021, Bowen was named commander for NASA's SpaceX Crew-6. The flight lifted off on March 2, 2023 to the International Space Station, using Crew Dragon Endeavour.

== Awards and honors ==
- Defense Meritorious Service Medal
- Navy Commendation Medals (3)
- Navy Achievement Medals (2)
