= Warren Hoburg =

American astronaut (born 1985)

Woody Hoburg
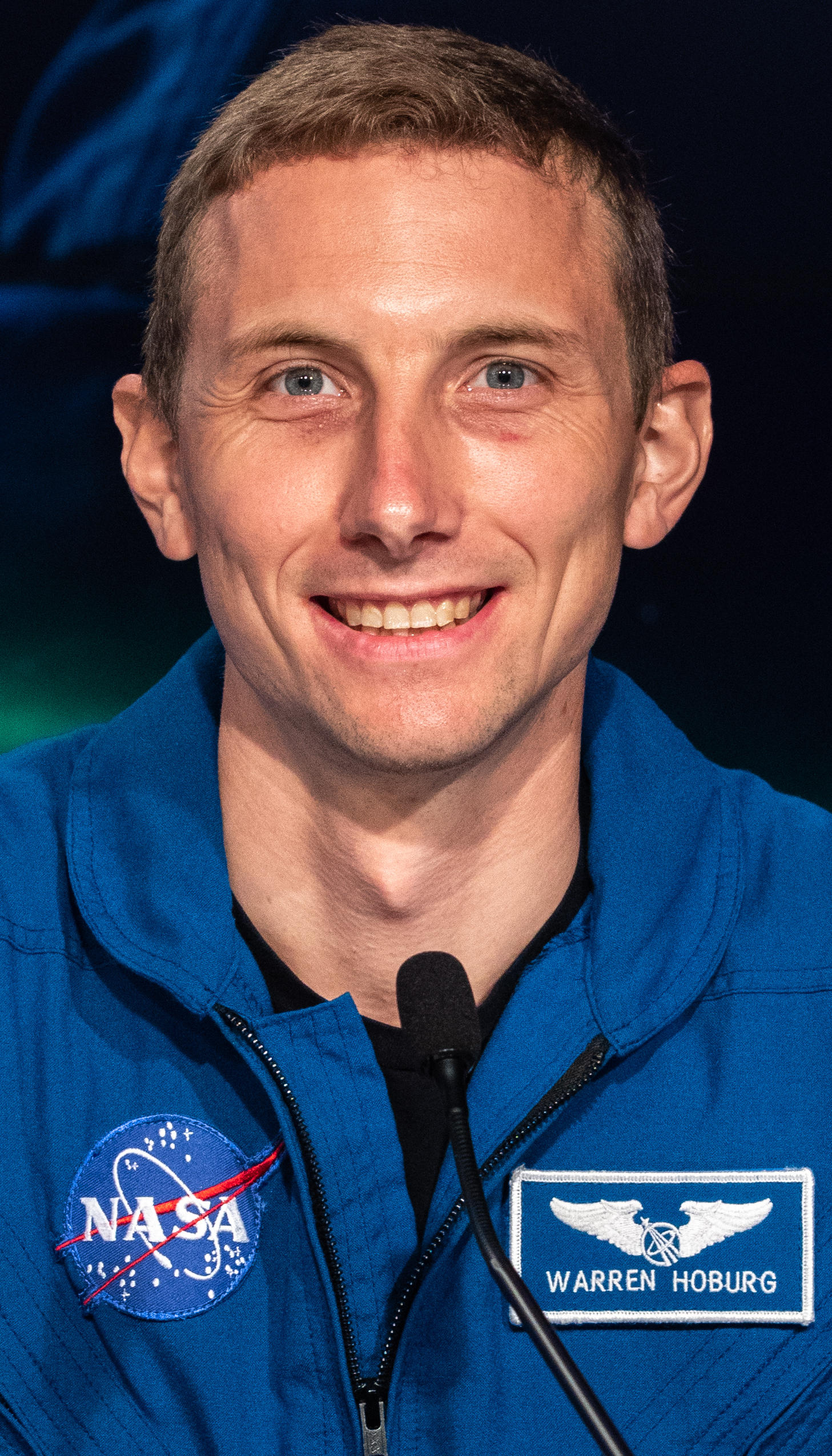
- Born: Warren Woodrow Hoburg; September 16, 1985 (age 41); Pittsburgh, Pennsylvania, U.S.
- Education: Massachusetts Institute of Technology (BS); University of California, Berkeley (MS, PhD)
- Space career

NASA astronaut
- Time in space: 185 days, 22 hours, 43 minutes
- Selection: NASA Group 22 (2017)
- Total EVAs: 2
- Total EVA time: 11 hours, 38 minutes
- Missions: SpaceX Crew-6 (Expedition 68/69)
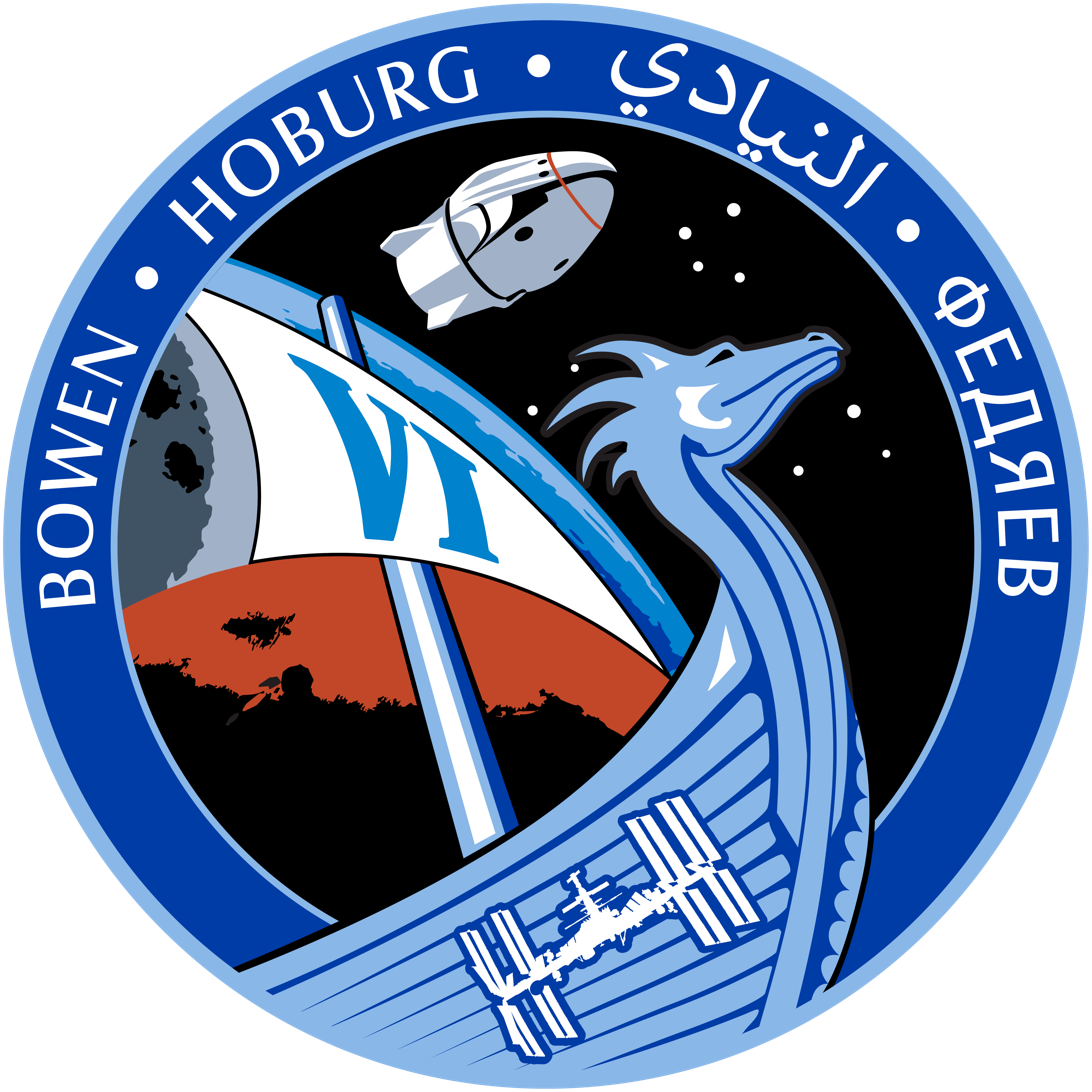
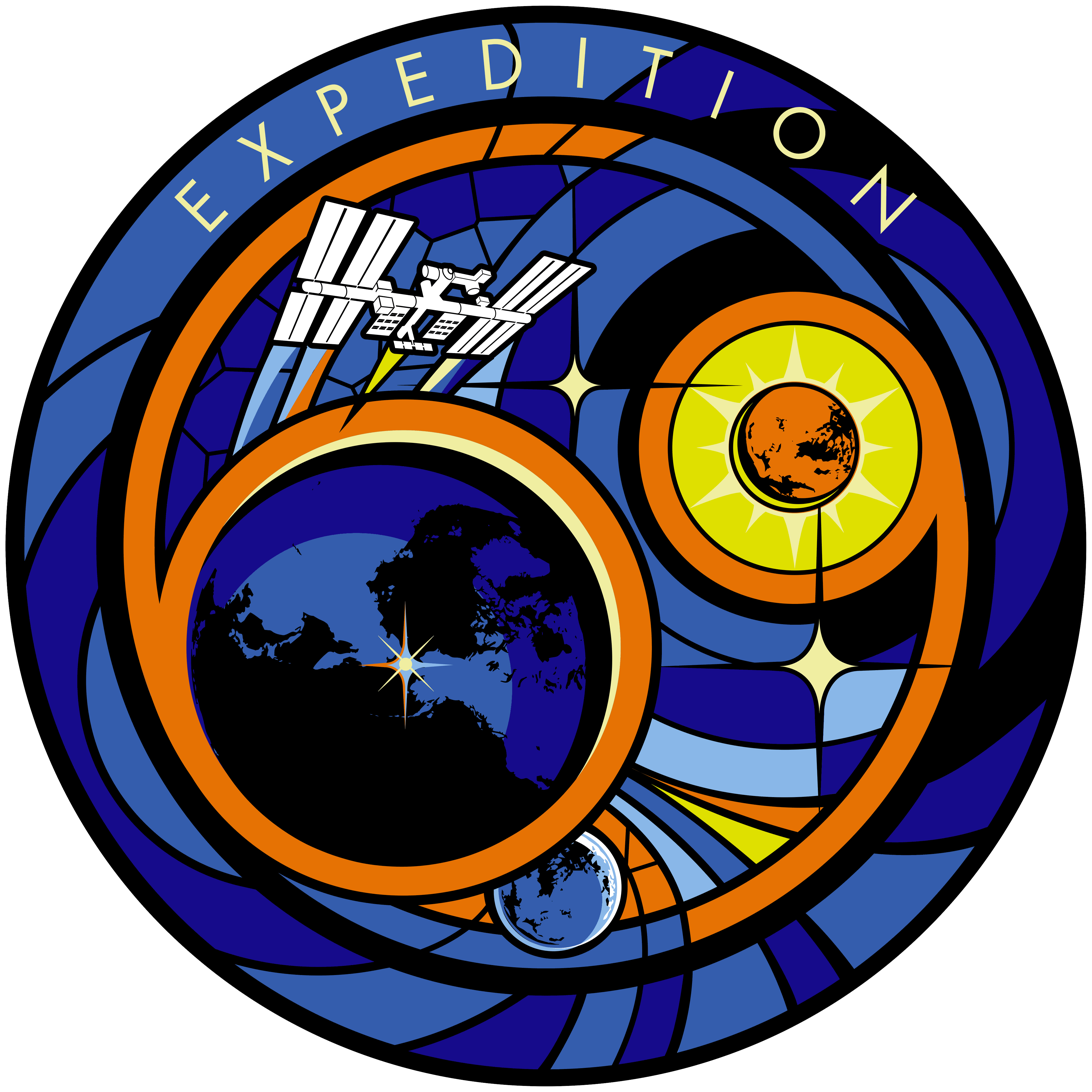
- Mission insignia
- Scientific career
- Fields: Electrical engineering Computer science
- Thesis: Aircraft Design Optimization as a Geometric Program (2013)

Waren Woodrow "Woody" Hoburg (born September 16, 1985) is an American engineer and NASA astronaut.

== Early life and education ==
Hoburg was born on September 16, 1985, in Pittsburgh, Pennsylvania, to Jim and Peggy Hoburg. While attending North Allegheny High School he participated in the first-ever Team America Rocketry Challenge and competed in the national finals. He received a Bachelor of Science degree in aeronautics and astronautics at the Massachusetts Institute of Technology in 2008. He earned a Master of Science in 2011, followed by a Ph.D. in 2013, in electrical engineering and computer science at the University of California, Berkeley.

== Academic career ==
After completing his doctorate, Hoburg worked in product development at Boeing until 2014, when he became an assistant professor at MIT. He served as a sponsor for the capstone project Jungle Hawk Owl, which is a UAV sponsored by the US Air Force. He also manages the geometric programming Python package GPKit.

== NASA career ==
In June 2017, Hoburg was selected as an astronaut candidate in NASA Astronaut Group 22 and began two years of training in August. He completed his training on January 10, 2020.

Hoburg served as the pilot of SpaceX Crew-6, which launched aboard a Crew Dragon spacecraft on March 2, 2023. He served as a member of Expedition 68 and Expedition 69 aboard the International Space Station and conducted two spacewalks totaling 11 hours and 38 minutes. After spending just under 186 days in space, he returned to Earth, splashing down off the coast of Jacksonville, Florida, on September 4, 2023.

On September 28, 2026, NASA announced that Hoburg would command the Boeing Starliner-2 mission. The assignment was made earlier than is typical for a NASA astronaut, allowing Hoburg to work with Boeing during implementation of the spacecraft modifications. Starliner-2 is expected to launch to the International Space Station in 2028 as part of a six-month crew rotation mission.

== Personal life ==
Hoburg is an avid rock climber, mountaineer, and pilot. He has previously worked with Yosemite Search & Rescue and the Bay Area Mountain Rescue Unit.

== Awards and honors ==
Hoburg was a National Science Foundation research fellow from 2009 to 2013, and is a two-time recipient of the AIAA Aeronautics and Astronautics Teaching Award.
