= Sultan Al Neyadi =

Emirati astronaut (born 1981)

- سلطان النيادي
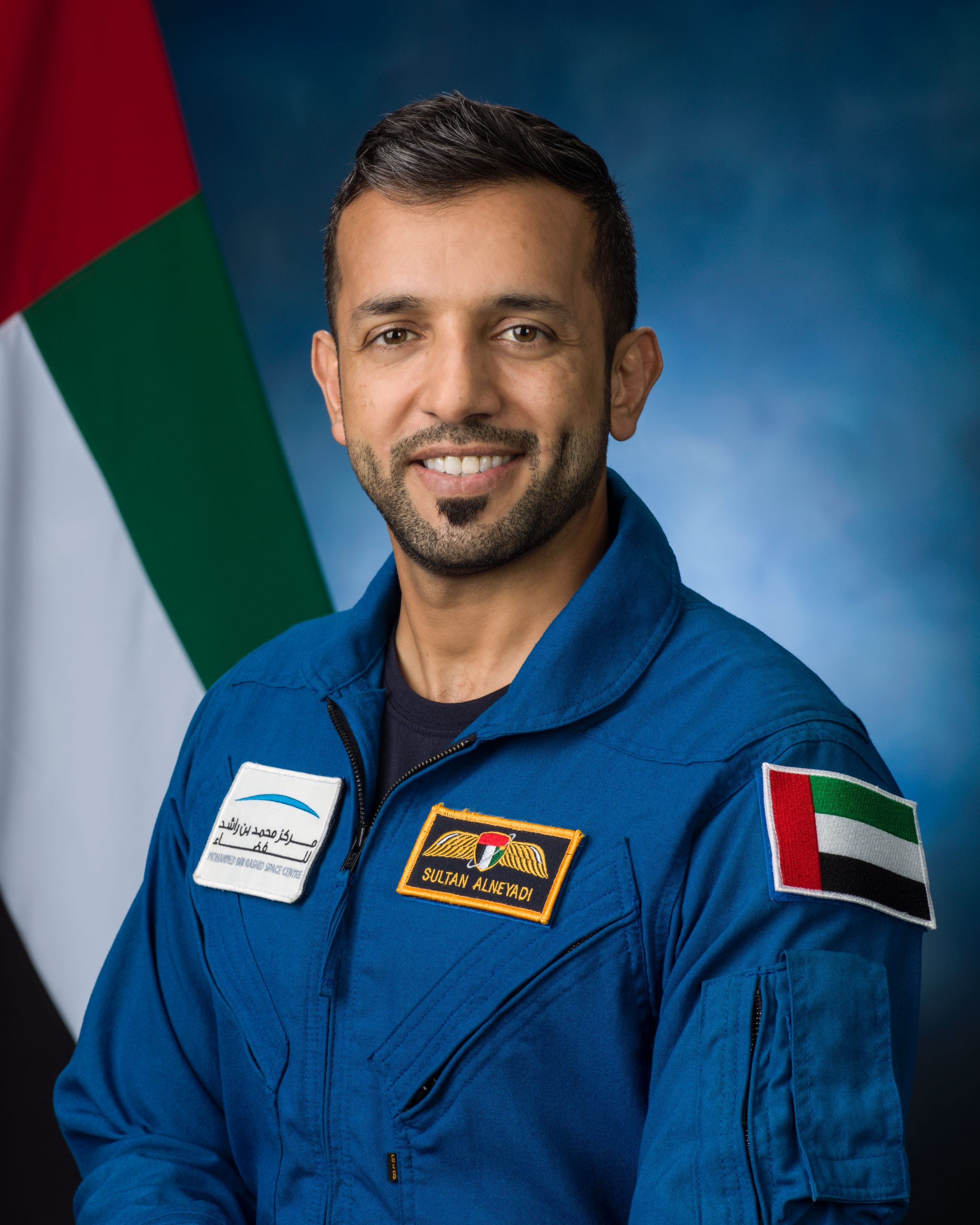
- Al Neyadi in 2022

UAE Minister of State for Youth Affairs
- Incumbent
- Assumed office 11 January 2024
- President: Mohamed bin Zayed Al Nahyan
- Prime Minister: Mohammed bin Rashid Al Maktoum
- Preceded by: Shamma Al Mazrui

Personal details
- Born: Sultan Saif Muftah Hamad Al Neyadi; 25 May 1981 (age 45) Al Ain, United Arab Emirates
- Children: 6
- Education: University of Brighton (BS) Griffith University (MS, PhD)
- Occupation: Engineer
- Space career

MBRSC astronaut
- Time in space: 185 days, 22 hours, 43 minutes
- Selection: MBRSC Group 1 (2018)
- Total EVAs: 1
- Total EVA time: 7 hours, 1 minute
- Missions: SpaceX Crew-6 (Expedition 68/69)
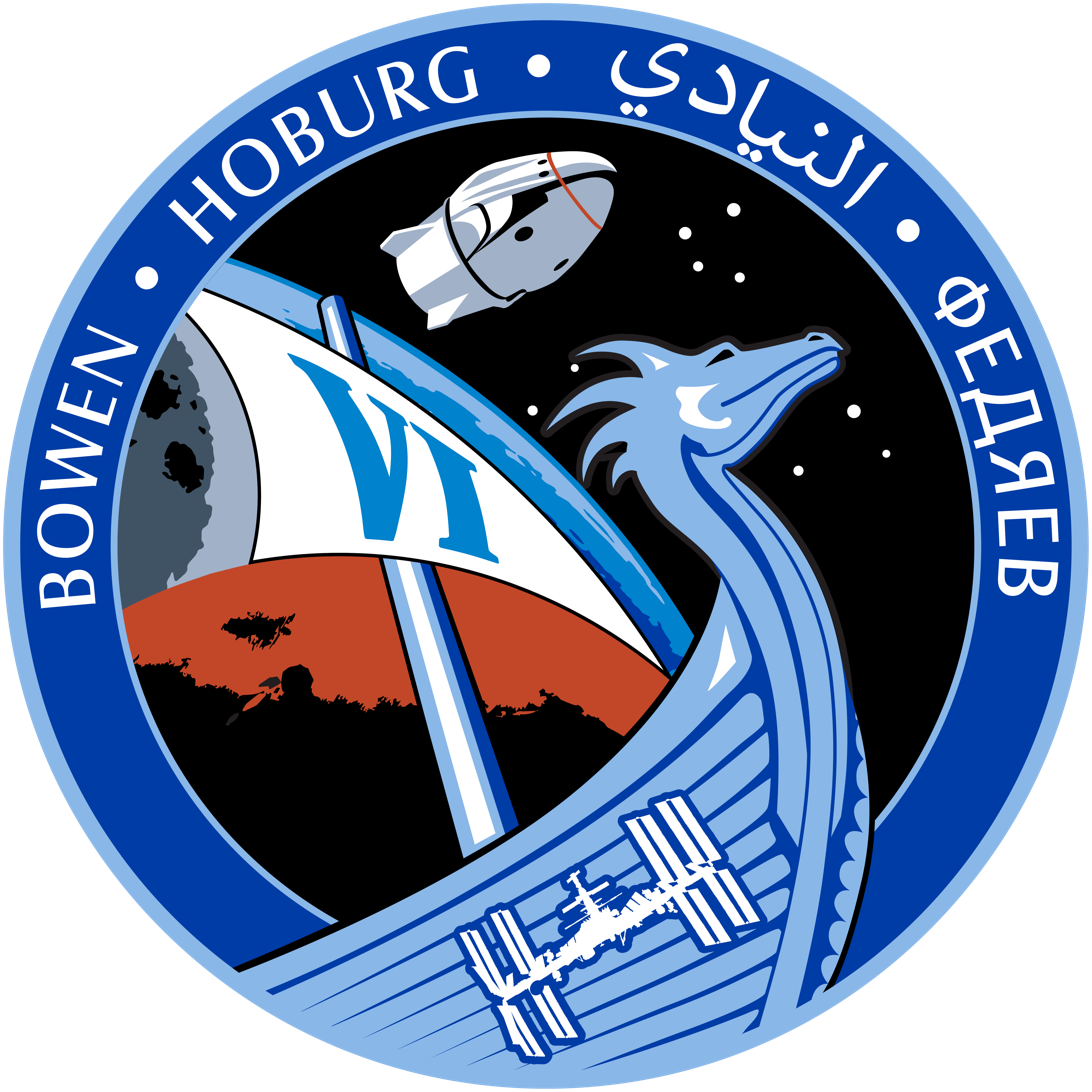
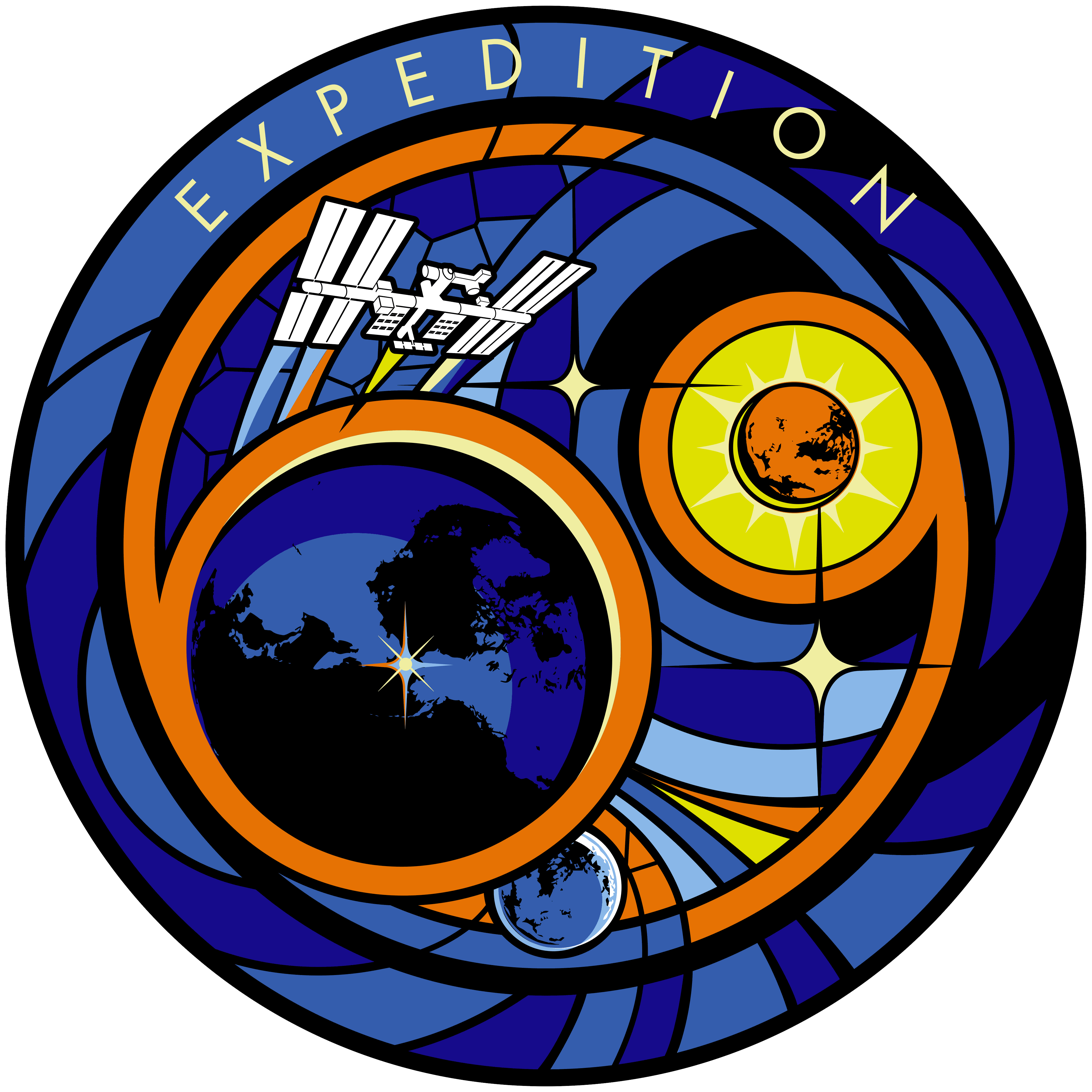
- Mission insignia

Sultan Saif Al Neyadi (Arabic: سلطان النيادي; born 23 May 1981) is the UAE Minister of State for Youth Affairs and an astronaut. He is one of the first two Arab astronauts or najmonauts from the United Arab Emirates, along with Hazzaa Al Mansoori. He is the first Arab to serve on the International Space Station (ISS) for a 6-month mission as part of Expedition 69 and the first Arab astronaut to perform a spacewalk. He was sworn in on 11 January 2024 as the UAE Minister of Youth.

Al Neyadi was the back-up astronaut for Hazzaa AlMansoori, in the UAE's first scientific mission to the ISS in 2019, under the slogan "Zayed's Ambition".

== Professional and personal life ==
Al Neyadi was born on 25 May 1981, in Umm Ghafa, 30 kilometers southeast of Al Ain, Abu Dhabi, where he received primary and secondary education. He went to Umm Ghafa Primary Boys School and Umm Ghafa Secondary School, and excelled in his education.

Al Neyadi joined the UAE Armed Forces and was sent to study abroad. He received a Bachelor of Science in electronics and communications engineering from the University of Brighton. Al Neyadi is an alumnus of Griffith University where he received a Masters of Science and a PhD in information technology in 2008 and 2012, respectively and published six research papers in peer-reviewed journals. At the armed forces, Al Neyadi worked as network security engineer and visited more than 20 countries.

Al Neyadi has a blue belt in jiu-jitsu, and has taken part in the Abu Dhabi World Professional Jiu-Jistu Championship in addition to the President’s Jiu-Jitsu Cup, both in 2018. He made history during his mission to the ISS, by becoming the first person to dress in a jiu-jitsu gi. He also posted a video outlining how the martial art helped foster skills of discipline, focus and adaptability that helped him during his preparation for the 6-month mission, and on the ISS.

== Mission and training ==
Al Neyadi along with his Crew-6 team launched from Cape Canaveral in Florida on 2 March 2023. Al Neyadi also became the first Arab to undertake a spacewalk during Expedition 69, along with NASA astronaut Stephen Bowen.

During the spacewalk, which lasted 7 hours and 1 minute, they successfully completed a series of preparatory tasks which included routing power cables, as a precursor to the installation of the iROSA.

In preparation for the ISS mission, Al Neyadi trained at the Yuri Gagarin Cosmonaut Training Center at Star City in Moscow, based on an agreement with Roscosmos. Al Neyadi underwent rigorous physical, technical and mental mission preparation training included zero-gravity simulation, centrifuge simulation to ready them for the high g-forces, Soyuz simulation, ISS simulation, and winter and water survival training in case of forced landing in an unexpected location. He also learned Russian, as it is the main communication language used aboard the Soyuz spacecraft.

AlNeyadi further received training in Houston, Texas and Cologne in Germany, as part of partnership agreements with major space agencies, including NASA, ESA, and JAXA. The training programme for the ISS mission, which lasted close to 5 years, included training on all sections and units of the ISS and how to use its devices and equipment, emergency fire drills, dealing with low pressure and ammonia leak inside the station, in addition to survival training if the capsule had to land in a cold forest.

AlNeyadi was also trained on the spacesuit, weighing up to 10 kgs and how to wear at zero gravity. He was also trained to perform daily tasks such as preparing food, how to use the camera to document events, taking pictures of the Earth, communicating with the ground stations, and other day-to-day tasks during the mission. AlNeyadi underwent more than 90 courses, with the total number of training hours exceeding 1,400 hours.

He further trained in the Neutral Buoyancy Laboratory (NBL), passed evaluations which included using the Extravehicular Mobility Unit (EMU), maintenance of the International Space Station, the Incapacitated Crew Rescue (ICR), and completed theoretical and practical training sessions on the T-38 jet.

He was granted the NASA astronaut’s pin after completing around 20 months of general training at NASA's Johnson Space Center.

== The UAE Astronaut Program ==
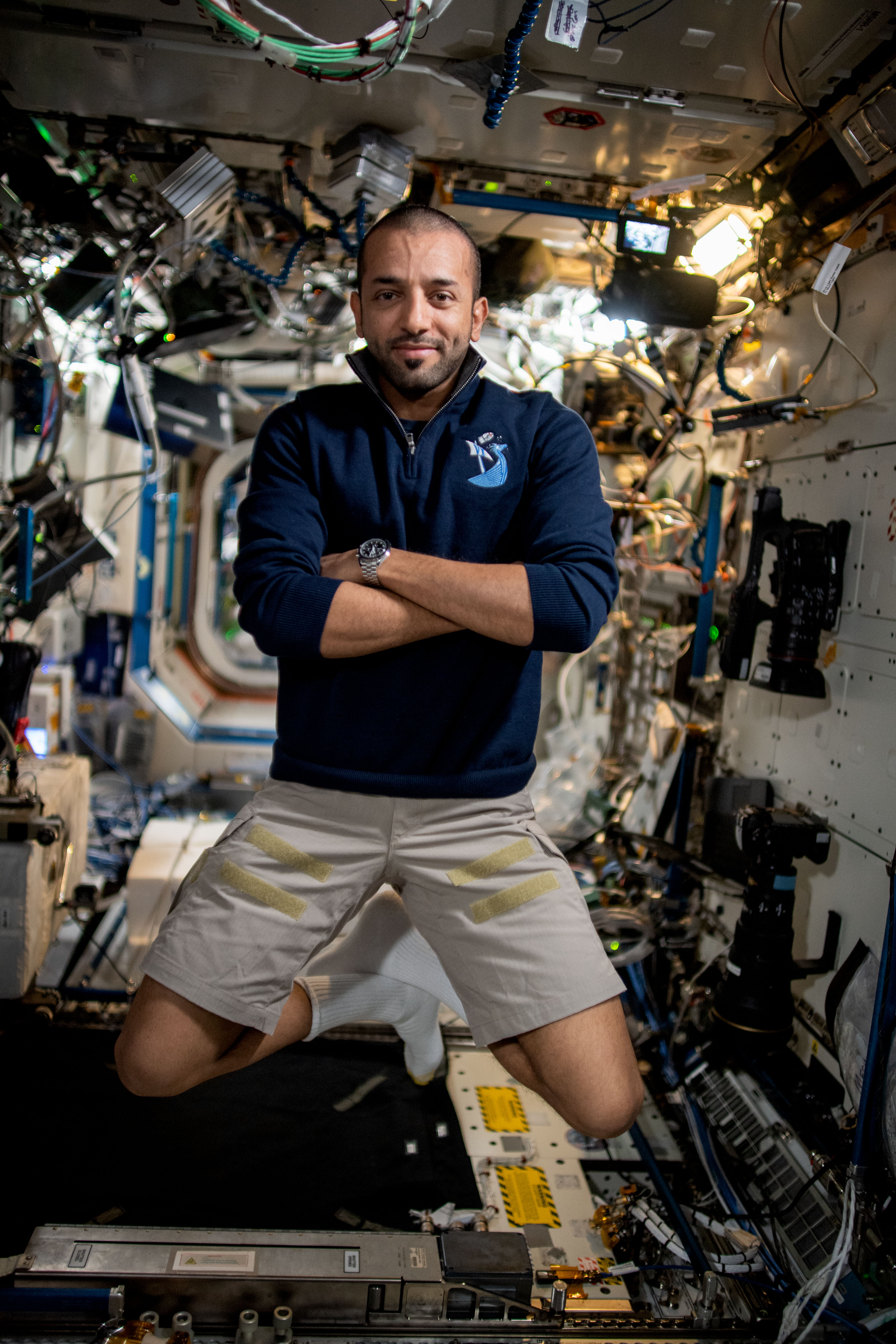
AlNeyadi on ISS, April 2023

The UAE Astronaut Programme is one of the projects managed by Mohammed bin Rashid Space Centre (MBRSC) and funded by the ICT Fund of the Telecommunications and Digital Government Regulatory Authority, which aims to support research and development in the ICT sector in the UAE and promote the country’s integration on the global stage.

In 2018, AlNeyadi was one of the two selected astronauts in the first batch of the UAE Astronaut Programme, launched by then-crown prince of Abu Dhabi Sheikh Mohammed bin Zayed Al Nahyan and Sheikh Mohammed bin Rashid Al Maktoum, the UAE's vice president and prime minister and ruler of Dubai. AlNeyadi was selected from over 4,000 more candidates, following a series of mental and physical tests in the UAE and abroad.

On 3 September 2018, Prime Minister Mohammed bin Rashid Al Maktoum tweeted: "We announced today our first astronauts to the International Space Station: Hazzaa Al Mansoori and Sultan AlNayadi. Hazzaa and Sultan represent all young Arabs and represent the pinnacle of the UAE's ambitions."

It was later announced that AlMansoori would fly the first mission, with AlNeyadi as his back up, meaning AlMansoori did his preparations to become the first person from the UAE to fly in space and AlNeyadi did his preparations to step in and fly the mission if anything were to happen to AlMansoori that would compromise him flying the mission. AlMansoori was launched in the Soyuz MS-15 on 25 September 2019 for an approximately eight-day mission on the ISS before returning to Earth on 3 October 2019.

The MBRSC and Roscosmos engaged in negotiations to support a six-month ISS mission for a crew member from the UAE, which would be the first long-duration space mission in the Arab World. AlNeyadi would be the logical choice for the mission. However, it was announced in April 2022 that MBRSC instead acquired a seat from Axiom Space for a UAE astronaut to travel to the ISS on NASA’s crew rotation flight, SpaceX Crew-6. In July, AlNeyadi was officially assigned this seat, and reached space for the first time in March 2023. On 28 April 2023, AlNeyadi became the first Arab to perform a spacewalk.

== Experiments being conducted on ISS ==
AlNeyadi, during his tenure of over 4,000 hours aboard the ISS, participated in 20+ research experiments and studies in collaboration with NASA, European Space Agency (ESA), Canadian Space Agency (CSA), Japan Aerospace Exploration Agency (JAXA) and the National Centre for Space Studies (CNES) on a wide range of topics, including:

- Research into the cardiovascular system, the body's oxygen delivery network, could help develop interventions that slow vascular aging and improve life quality on Earth.
- Investigations into back pain, a common problem for astronauts. The findings could inform countermeasures to reduce spinal injuries in space and improve spinal health in the general population.
- Technical demonstrations which will contribute to the development of future technologies for deep space exploration. The ISS's external and internal environments offer an ideal testing ground for new materials and spacecraft technologies.
- Epigenetics, which focuses on the processes that change gene activity without altering DNA, has broad applications, from developing biomedical countermeasures to crafting personalised medicine strategies.
- Immune system studies which will further illuminate the effects of stress on immune changes in healthy adults.
- Fluid science which will explore how various substances behave in zero-gravity, while plant biology research could lead to significant agricultural advances on Earth.
- Material science experiments which will enhance understanding of materials processing, leading to potentially cheaper and more durable designs.
- Sleep analysis which will deepen understanding of sleep's impact on astronaut health.
- Radiation research which will help predict space radiation exposure for future exploration missions.

As part of the UAE Astronaut Programme’s Grants Research Programme, AlNeyadi will also be supporting two research projects from the Mohammed Bin Rashid University of Medicine and Health Sciences supported. One will assess how microgravity affects cardio-postural interactions, while the other will study dental/oral cells in a microgravity simulated environment. Both initiatives aim to nurture a new generation of scientists.

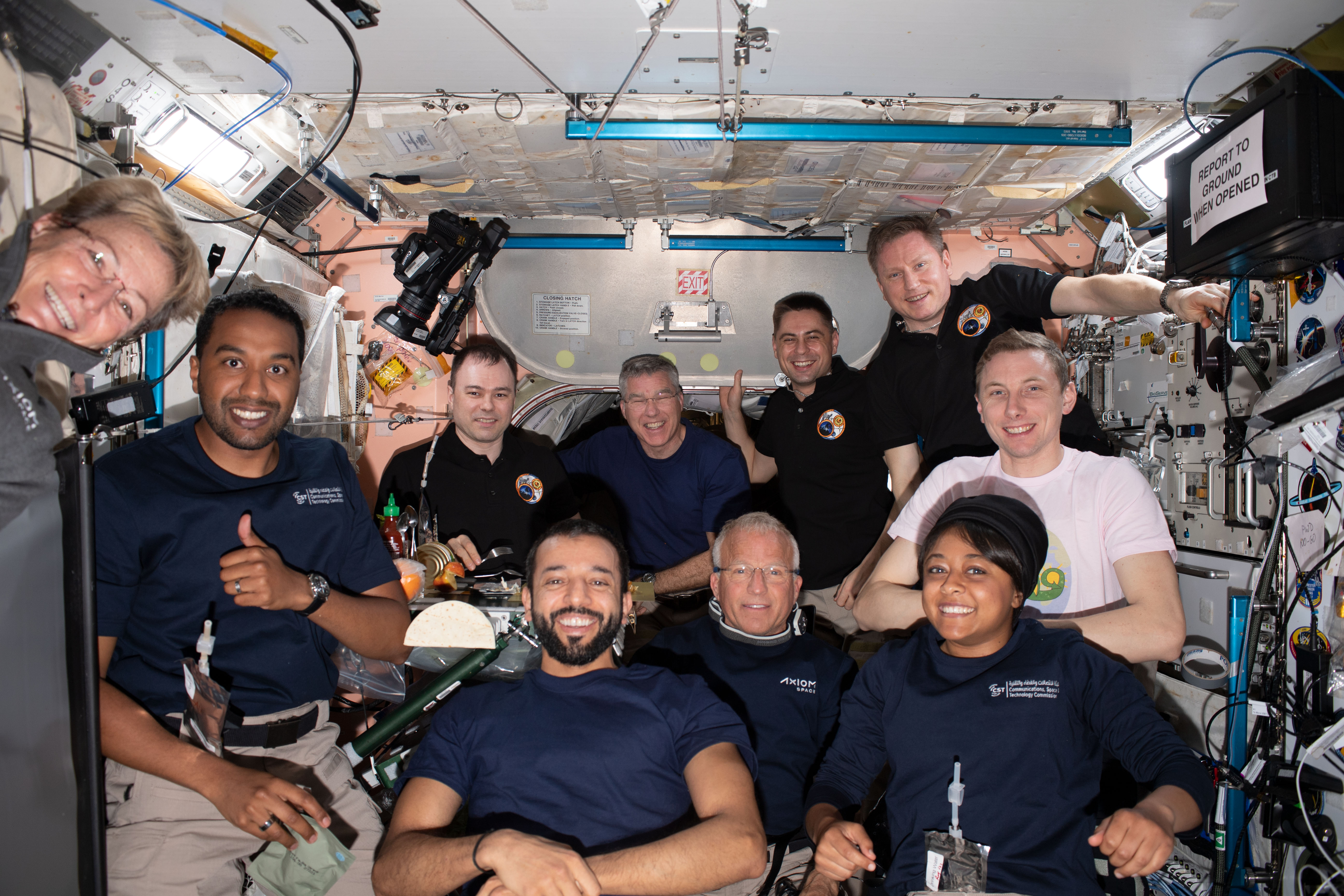
Expedition 69 Crew during dinner at ISS Axiom Mission 2 members while celebrating Sultan AlNeyadi's birthday (Not pictured is NASA astronaut Francisco Rubio)
