= SpaceX Crew-6 =

2023 American crewed spaceflight to the ISS

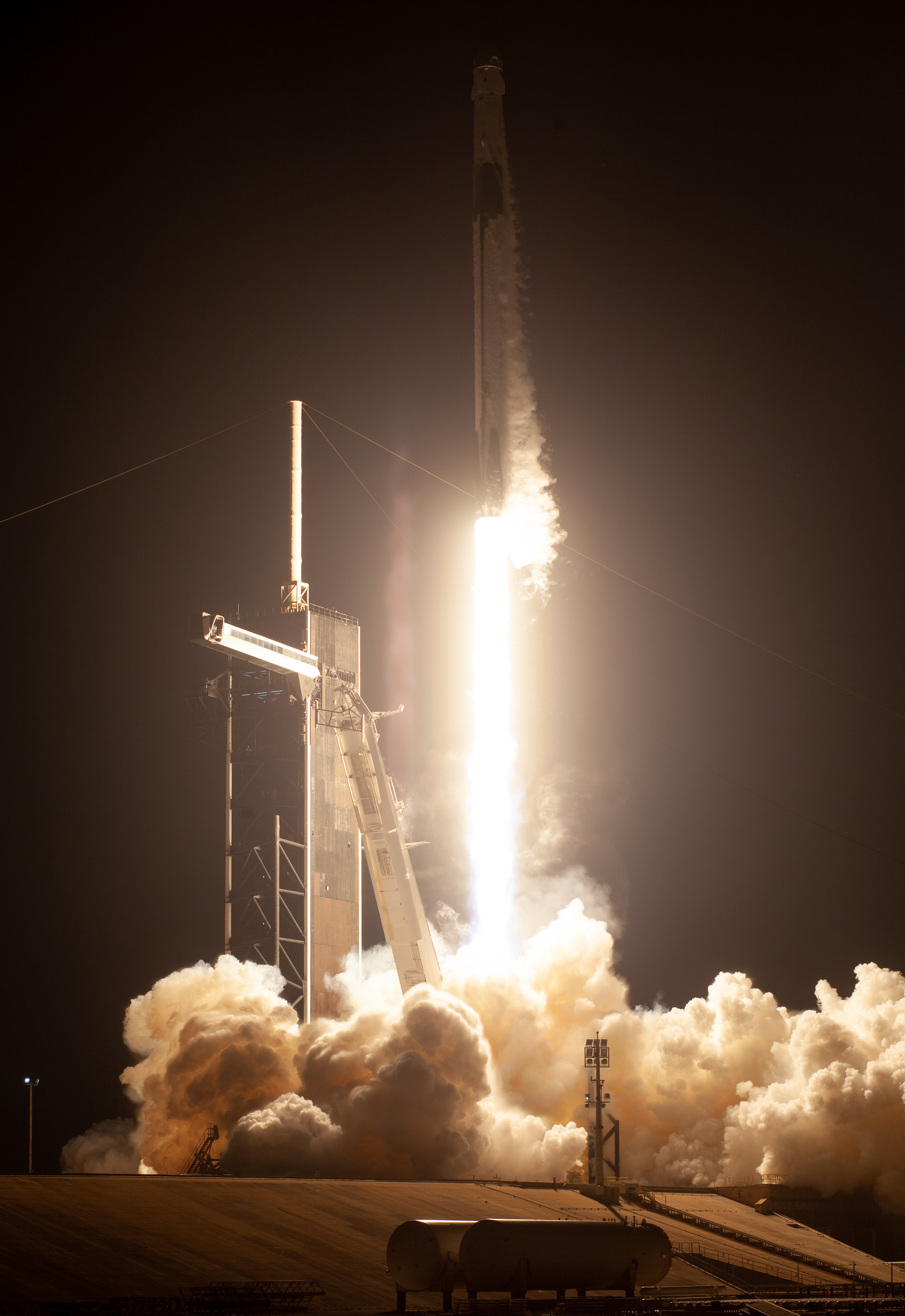
- Endeavour launches to the ISS with Crew-6 onboard
- Names: USCV-6
- Mission type: ISS crew transport
- Operator: SpaceX
- COSPAR ID: 2023-027A
- SATCAT no.: 55740
- Mission duration: 185 days, 22 hours, 43 minutes

Spacecraft properties
- Spacecraft: Crew Dragon Endeavour
- Spacecraft type: Crew Dragon
- Manufacturer: SpaceX
- Launch mass: 12,519 kg (27,600 lb)
- Landing mass: 9,616 kg (21,200 lb)

Crew
- Crew size: 4
- Members: Stephen Bowen; Warren Hoburg; Sultan Al Neyadi; Andrey Fedyaev
- Expedition: Expedition 68/69

Start of mission
- Launch date: 2 March 2023, 05:34:14 UTC (12:34:14 pm EDT)
- Rocket: Falcon 9 Block 5 (B1078‑1), Flight 207
- Launch site: Kennedy, LC‑39A

End of mission
- Recovered by: MV Megan
- Landing date: 4 September 2023, 04:17:23 UTC (12:17:23 am EDT)
- Landing site: Atlantic Ocean, near Jacksonville, Florida (30.9°N 80.3°W)

Orbital parameters
- Reference system: Geocentric orbit
- Regime: Low Earth orbit
- Inclination: 51.66°

Docking with ISS
- Docking port: Harmony zenith
- Docking date: 3 March 2023, 06:40 UTC
- Undocking date: 6 May 2023, 11:23 UTC
- Time docked: 64 days, 4 hours, 43 minutes

Docking with ISS (relocation)
- Docking port: Harmony forward
- Docking date: 6 May 2023, 12:01 UTC
- Undocking date: 3 September 2023, 11:05 UTC
- Time docked: 119 days, 23 hours, 4 minutes
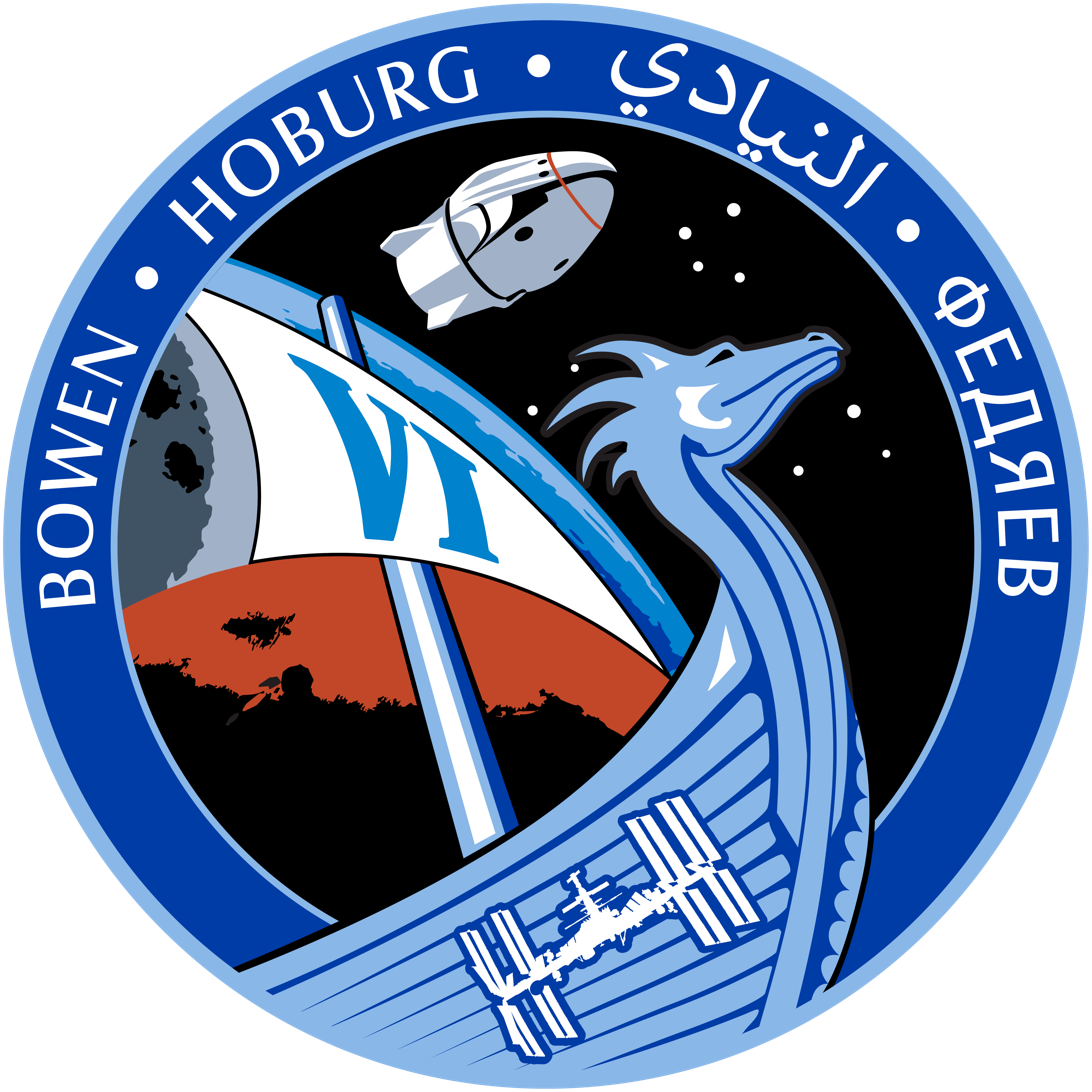
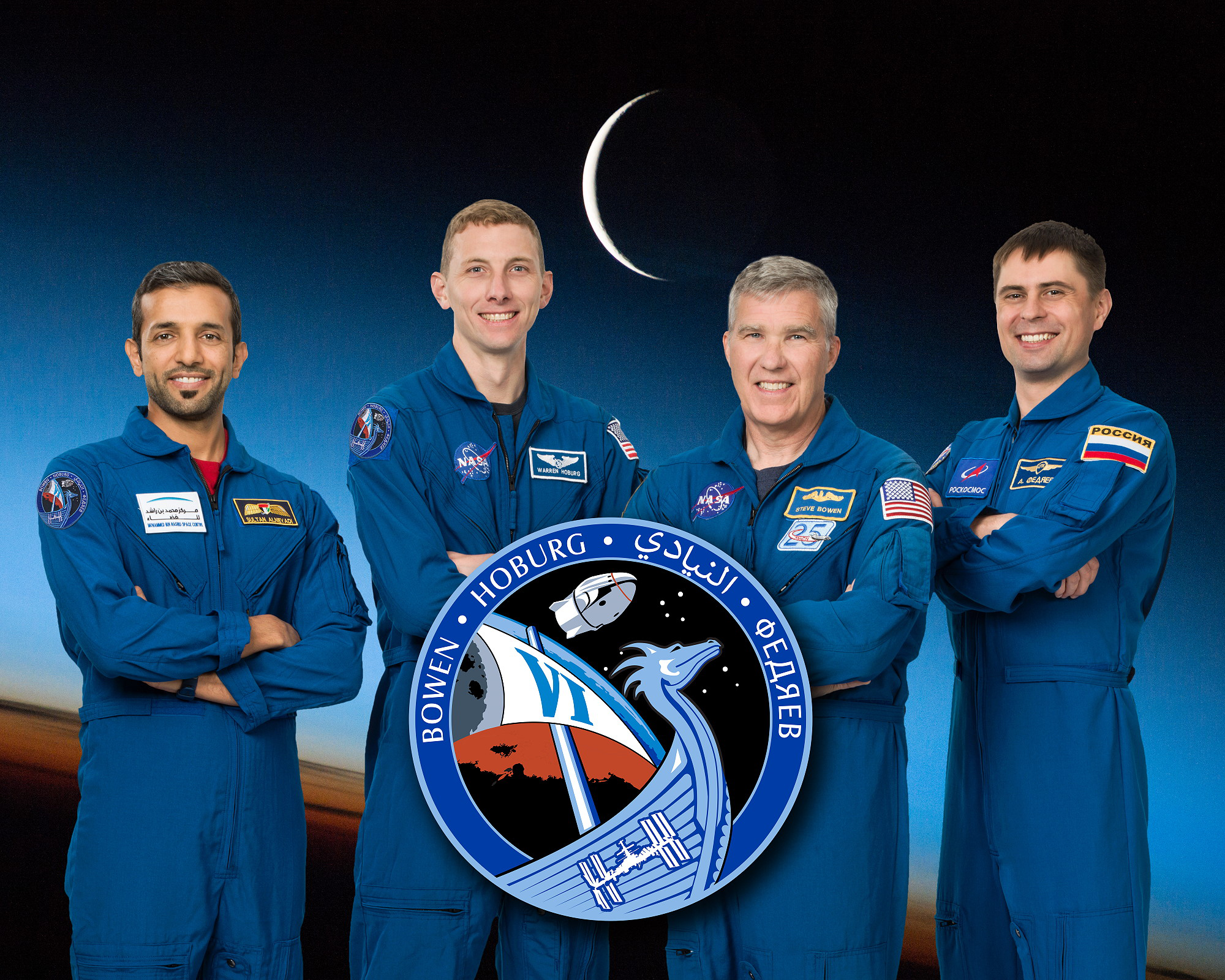
- Mission patch From left: Al Neyadi, Hoburg, Bowen and Fedyaev Commercial Crew Program Crew Dragon flights

SpaceX Crew-6 was the sixth crewed operational NASA Commercial Crew flight of a Crew Dragon spacecraft, and the ninth overall crewed orbital flight. The mission launched on 2 March 2023 at 05:34:14 UTC, and it successfully docked to the International Space Station (ISS) on 3 March 2023 at 06:40 UTC. The Crew-6 mission transported four crew members to the International Space Station (ISS). Two NASA astronauts, a United Arab Emirates astronaut, and a Russian cosmonaut were assigned to the mission. The two NASA astronauts are Stephen Bowen and Warren Hoburg. The cosmonaut, Andrey Fedyaev, was reassigned from Soyuz MS-23. Sultan Al Neyadi was the commander of the United Arab Emirates' mission on the flight.

== Crew ==
On 24 March 2022, the European Space Agency announced that Danish astronaut Andreas Mogensen would serve as backup pilot. On 29 April 2022, the Mohammed bin Rashid Space Centre (MBRSC) and Axiom Space announced that Crew-6 would also include an astronaut from the United Arab Emirates.

MBRSC participation in this mission resulted from a 2021 agreement between NASA and Axiom to fly a NASA astronaut, Mark T. Vande Hei, onboard Soyuz MS-18 (launch) and Soyuz MS-19 (return) in order to ensure a continuing American presence on board the ISS. In return, Axiom received the rights to a NASA owned seat onboard SpaceX Crew-6. Axiom provided the flight opportunity to MBRSC professional crew members through an agreement with the United Arab Emirates Space Agency. Later, the astronaut was confirmed to be Sultan Al Neyadi.

Andrey Fedyaev was selected in July 2022 for this mission as a part of the Soyuz-Dragon crew swap system of keeping at least one NASA astronaut and one Roscosmos cosmonaut on each of the crew rotation missions. This ensures both countries have a presence on the station, and the ability to maintain their separate systems if either Soyuz or commercial crew vehicles are grounded for an extended period.

Prime crew
Position	Astronaut
Commander	Stephen Bowen, NASA; Expedition 68/69; Fourth spaceflight
Pilot	Warren Hoburg, NASA; Expedition 68/69; First spaceflight
Mission specialist	Sultan Al Neyadi, MBRSC; Expedition 68/69; First spaceflight
Mission specialist	Andrey Fedyaev, Roscosmos; Expedition 68/69; First spaceflight

Backup crew
Position	Astronaut
Commander	Jasmin Moghbeli, NASA
Pilot	Andreas Mogensen, ESA
Mission	Hazza Al Mansouri, MBRSC
Mission specialist	Konstantin Borisov, Roscosmos

== Mission ==
The sixth SpaceX operational mission in the Commercial Crew Program (CCP) was launched on 2 March 2023 and lasted approximately six months. The mission was scheduled to launch early on 27 February 2023. However, the initial attempt was scrubbed and rescheduled for 2 March 2023 at 5:34 am UTC. The second launch attempt was successful.

Alongside Crew-6, the Dragon capsule is designed to be able to bring back the Soyuz MS-22 crew if necessary, serving as an emergency evacuation, as was Crew-5. Roscosmos elected to launch Soyuz MS-23 without a crew to return the MS-22 crew instead of using this capability.

=== Launch attempt ===
The first launch attempt was scrubbed at T−02:12 minutes due to an issue with the TEA-TEB spontaneous ignition fluid (times are UTC).

Attempt	Planned	Result	Turnaround	Reason	Decision point	Weather go (%)	Notes
1	27 Feb 2023, 6:45:03 am	Scrubbed	—	Technical	27 Feb 2023, 6:43 am (T−2:12)	95	TEA-TEB ignitor issue. Rocket launch failure risk (wrong ignition or premature engine cutoff).
2	2 Mar 2023, 5:34:14 am	Success	2 days 22 hours 49 minutes			95	

== Gallery ==
SpaceX Crew-6
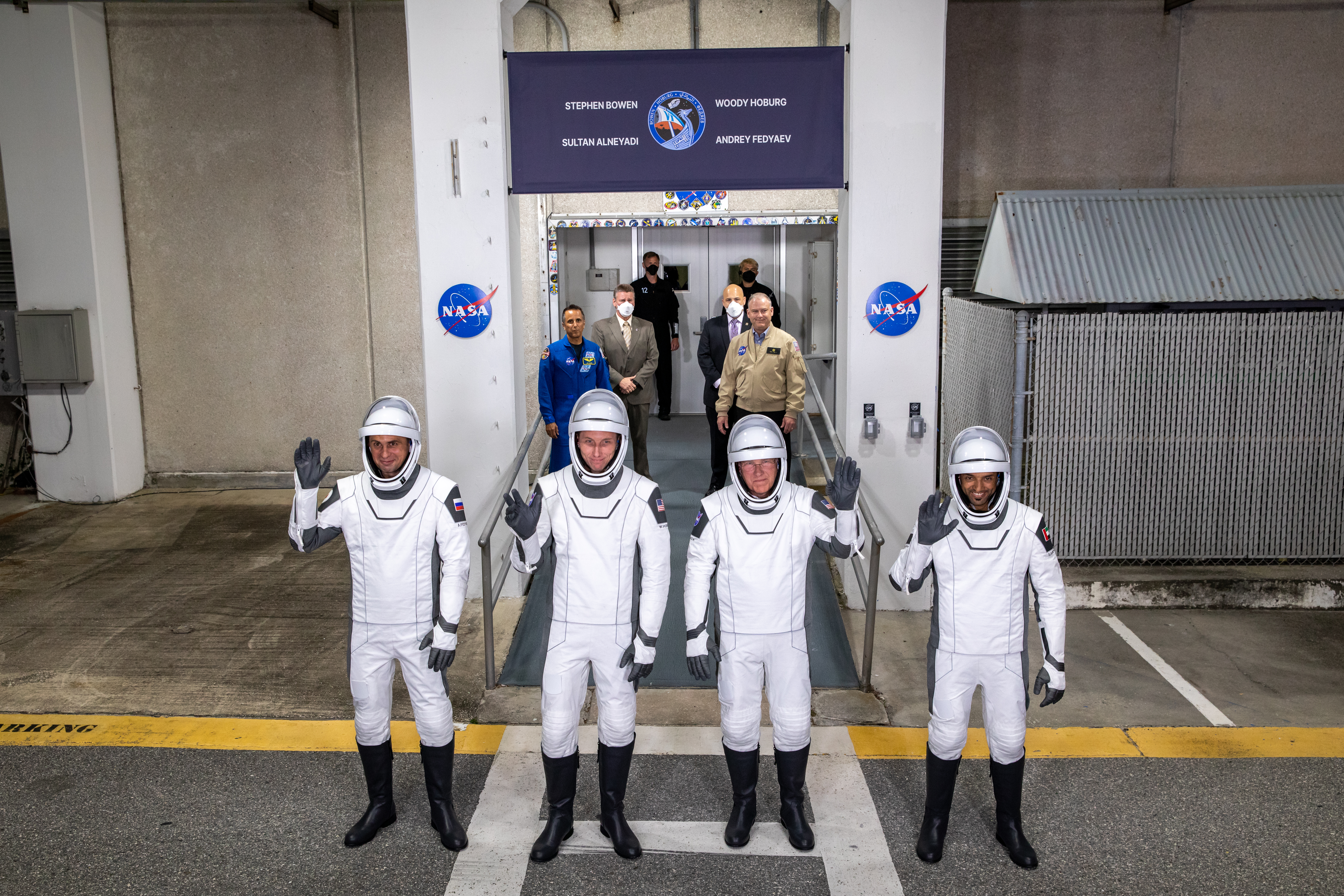
Crew-6 astronauts prior to launch

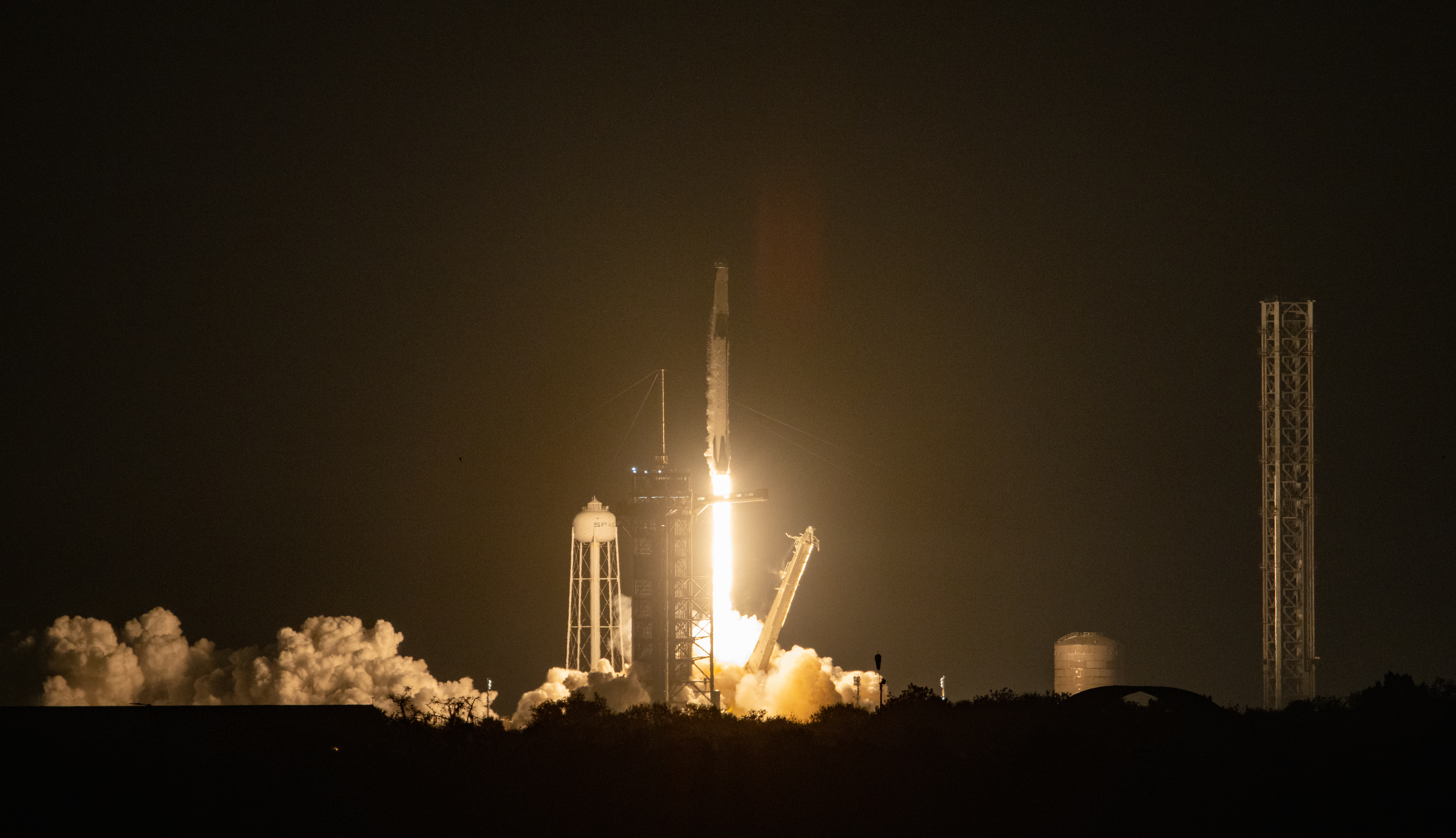
Crew-6 launch

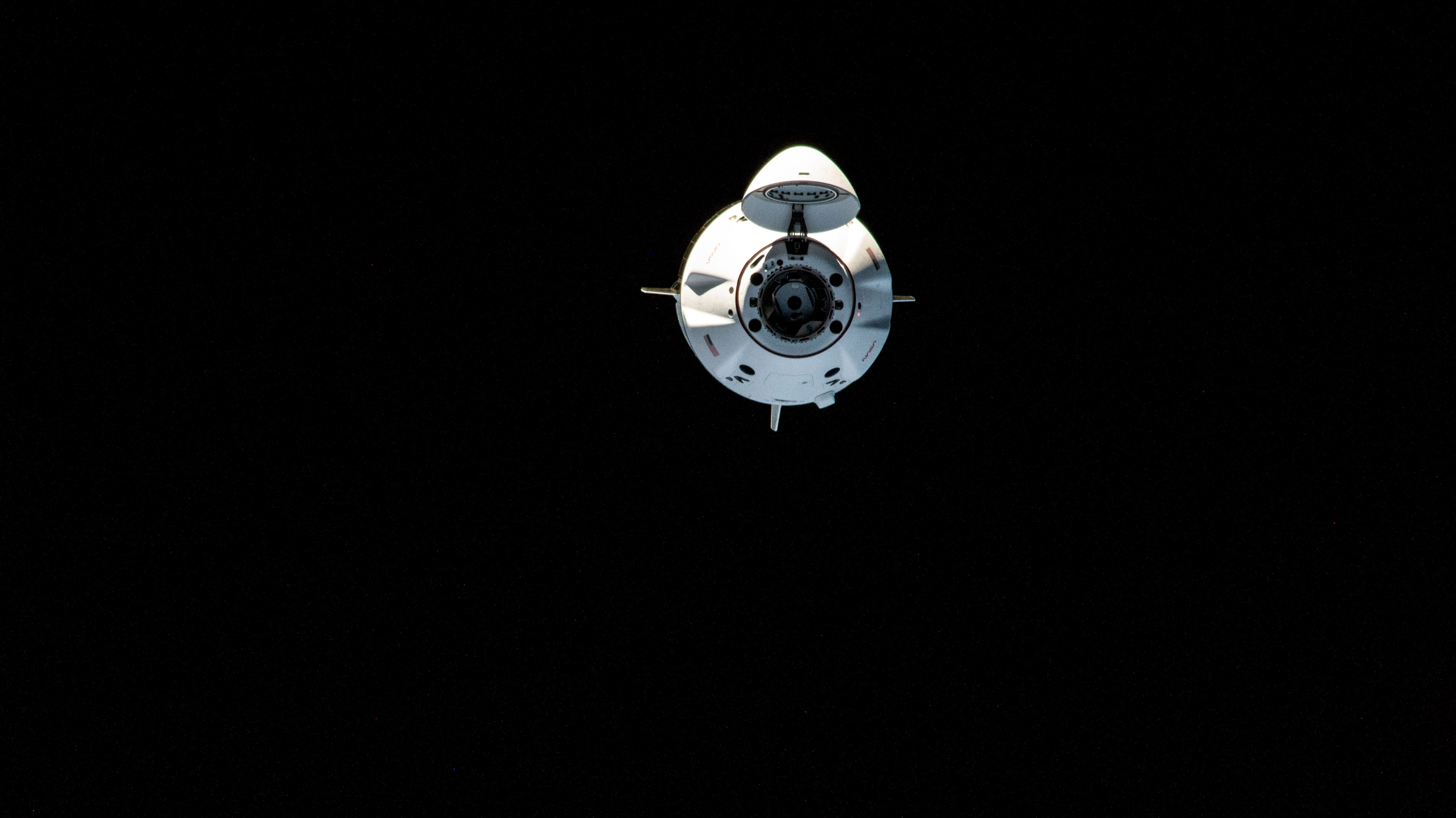
Crew-6 approaching the ISS

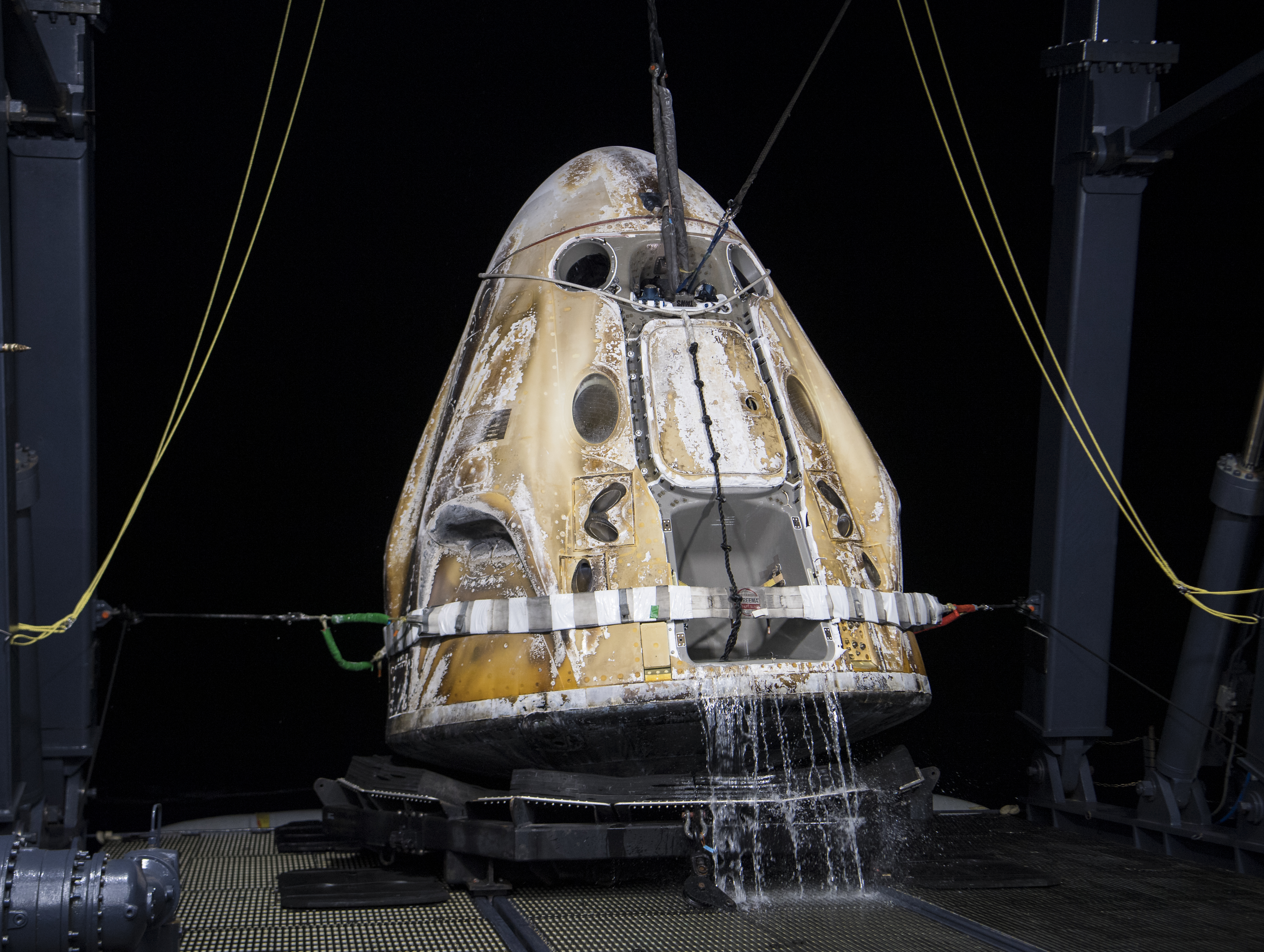
Crew Dragon Endeavour after splashdown
