= Expedition 69 =

ISS long-duration mission

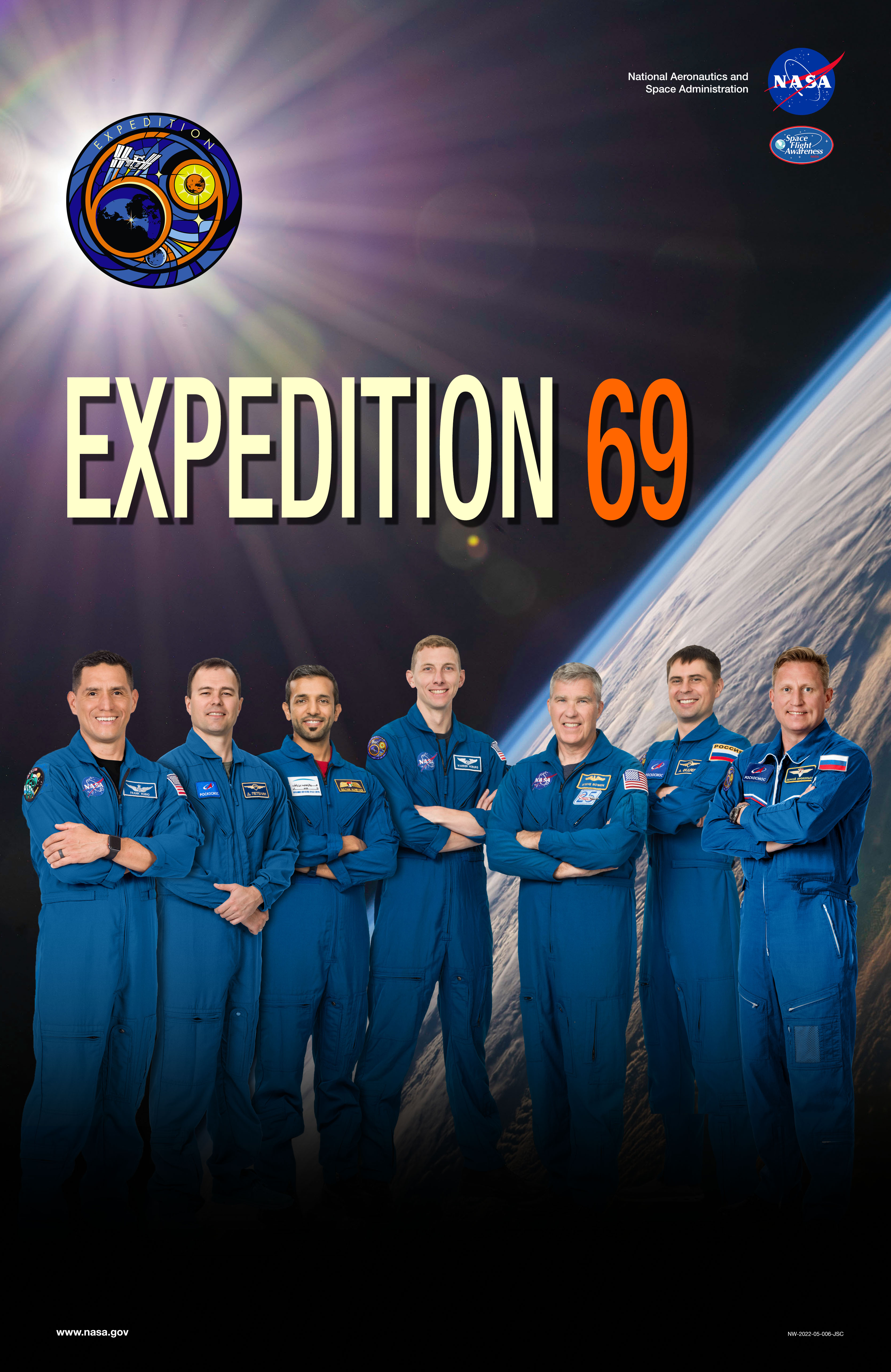
- Promotional poster
- Mission type: Long-duration expedition
- Operator: NASA / Roscosmos
- Mission duration: 182 days, 21 hours and 57 minutes

Expedition
- Space station: International Space Station
- Began: 28 March 2023
- Ended: 27 September 2023
- Arrived aboard: Soyuz MS-22; SpaceX Crew-6; SpaceX Crew-7; Soyuz MS-24
- Departed aboard: SpaceX Crew-6; Soyuz MS-23

Crew
- Crew size: 7–11
- Members: Expedition 67/68/69: Sergey Prokopyev; Dmitry Petelin; Francisco Rubio; Expedition 68/69: Stephen Bowen; Warren Hoburg; Sultan Al Neyadi; Andrey Fedyaev; Expedition 69/70: Jasmin Moghbeli; Andreas Mogensen; Satoshi Furukawa; Konstantin Borisov; Loral O'Hara; Expedition 69/70/71: Oleg Kononenko; Nikolai Chub
- EVAs: 8
- EVA duration: 51 hours and 58 minutes
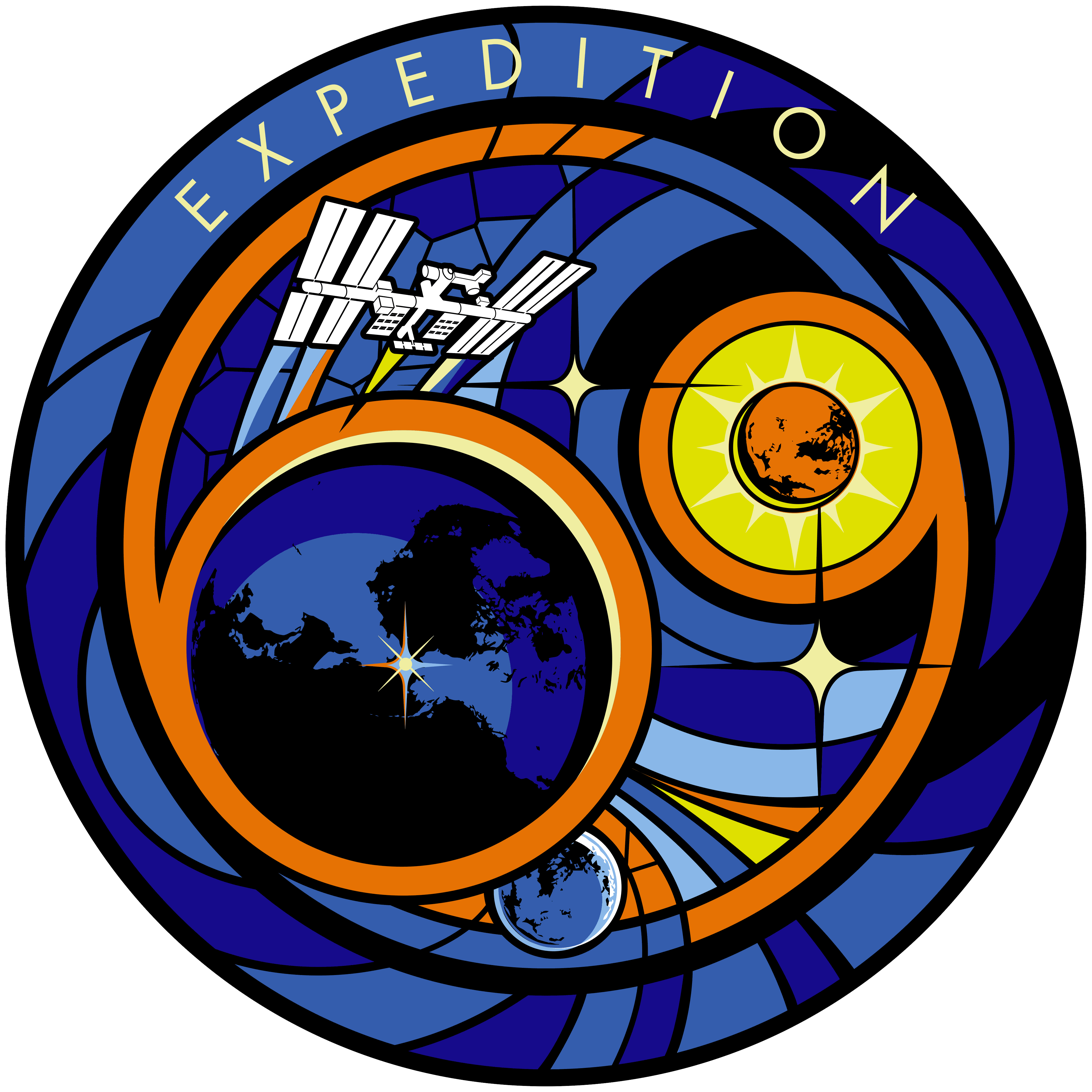
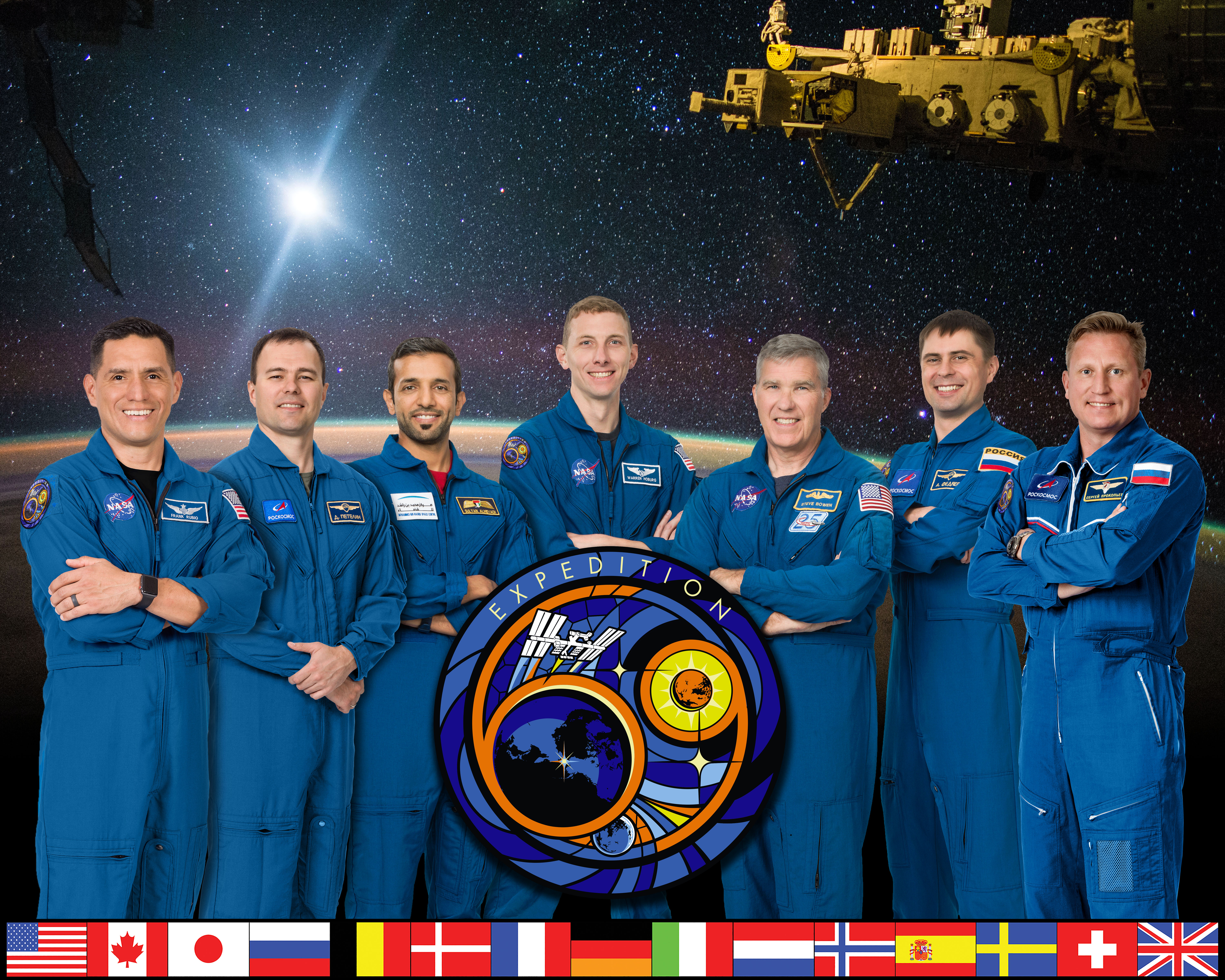
- Expedition 69 mission patch Expedition 69 crew portrait Expeditions

Expedition 69 was the 69th long-duration expedition to the International Space Station. The expedition began with the uncrewed departure of Soyuz MS-22 in March 2023 with Russian cosmonaut Sergey Prokopyev continuing his ISS command from Expedition 68. It ended with his departure onboard Soyuz MS-23 with his crewmates on 27 September 2023.

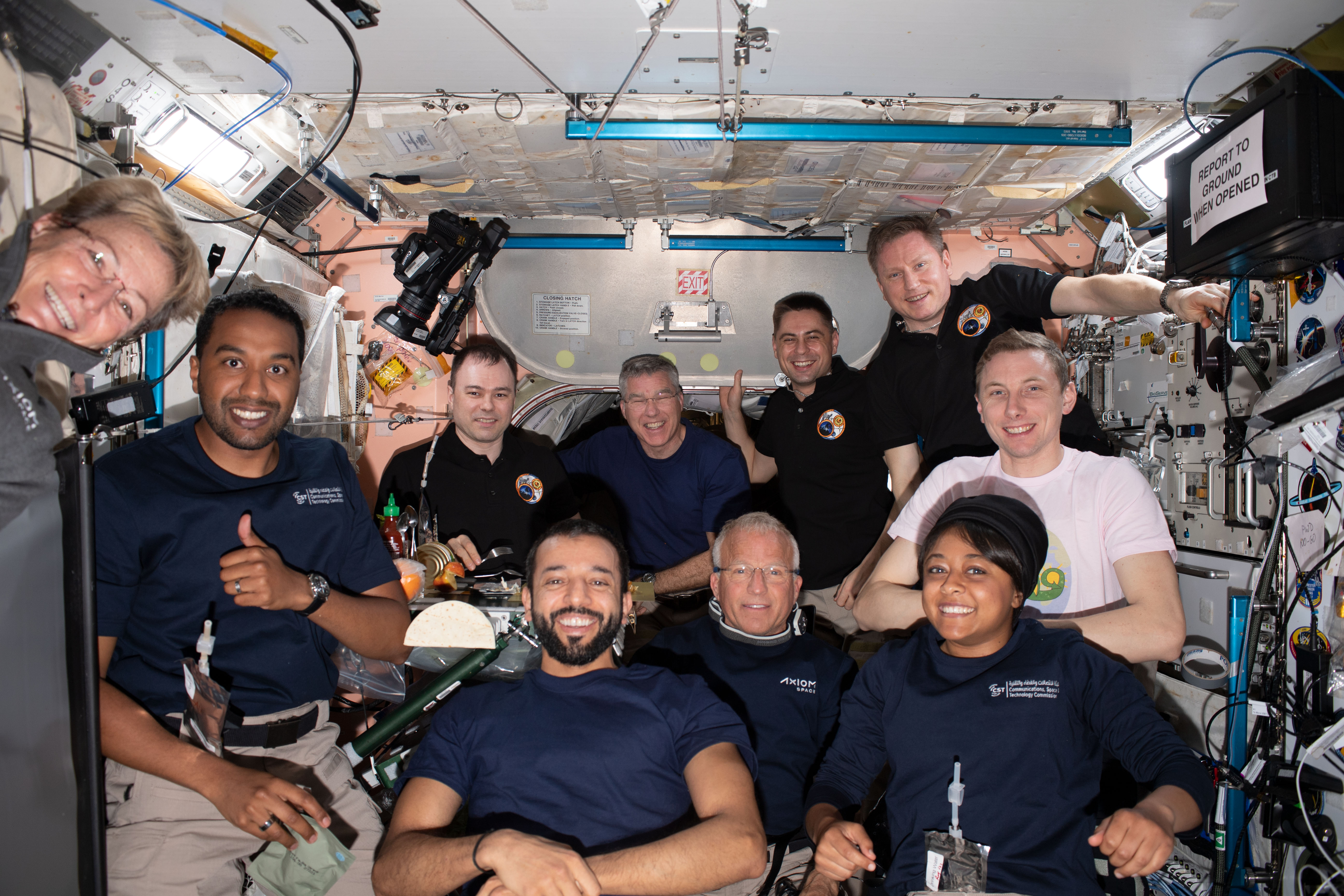
Expedition 69 crew during dinner with Axiom Mission 2 (Note: First row except Sultan Al Neyadi in center.) members while celebrating Sultan Al Neyadi's birthday inside the Unity module (not pictured is NASA astronaut Francisco Rubio)

== Background, Crew, and Events ==
Initially, the expedition consisted of Prokopyev and his two Soyuz MS-22/23 crewmates, Dmitry Petelin from Russia and American astronaut Francisco Rubio, as well as SpaceX Crew-6 crewmates, American astronauts Stephen G. Bowen and Warren Hoburg, Emirati astronaut Sultan Al Neyadi, and another Russian cosmonaut Andrey Fedyaev, who launched on March 2, 2023 and were transferred from Expedition 68 alongside the Soyuz MS-22/23 crew. The departure of the MS-22 spacecraft with its crew was ultimately canceled because of a coolant leak in December 2022. The decision was made to return Soyuz MS-22 uncrewed and launch Soyuz MS-23 uncrewed as its replacement. By the time the MS-22/23 crew returned to Earth on 27 September 2023, which was the end of Expedition 69, they had spent more than a year in space due to their mission extension.

The manifest changes do not affect US crew rotation plans, where SpaceX Crew-5 was replaced by Crew-6 in February during Expedition 68.

Previously, US crew handovers since flights returned in 2020 took place during a new expedition, about 2–3 weeks after the Soyuz handover occurs (which officially changes the expeditions). However, in this handover, the swap occurred before the Soyuz MS-22 departure date of March 28. The early US handover was a part of the manifest prior to the Soyuz MS-22 coolant leak in December 2022.

The crew was later replenished by subsequent crew rotation missions in the expedition, SpaceX Crew-7, consisting of NASA astronaut Jasmin Moghbeli, Danish astronaut Andreas Mogensen, Satoshi Furukawa from Japan, and Russian cosmonaut Konstantin Borisov, and Soyuz MS-24, consisting of Russian cosmonauts Oleg Kononenko and Nikolai Chub (both on a year long ISS mission) and another American astronaut Loral O'Hara. The space station was also visited by a non-expedition crew, Axiom Mission 2, consisting of former NASA astronaut Peggy Whitson (who had previously commanded the station twice during Expedition 16 and Expedition 51), John Shoffner, Ali AlQarni, and Rayyanah Barnawi.

== Events manifest ==
Events involving crewed spacecraft are listed in bold.

Previous mission: Expedition 68

- 28 March 2023 – Soyuz MS-22 uncrewed undocking, official switch from Expedition 68
- 6 April 2023 – **Soyuz MS-23 redocking**
- 15 April 2023 – CRS SpX-27 undocking
- 16 April 2023 – EVA 1 (VKD-56) Prokopyev/Petelin: 7 hrs, 55 mins
- 16 April 2023 – Relocation of Nauka outfitting: Moving "RtoD" add-on heat radiator from Rassvet module to Nauka module
- 21 April 2023 – CRS NG-18 unberthing and release
- 28 April 2023 – EVA 2 (US-86) Bowen/Al Neyadi: 7 hrs, 1 min
- 3–4 May 2023 – EVA 3 (VKD-57) Prokopyev/Petelin: 7 hrs, 11 mins
- 4 May 2023 – Relocation of Nauka outfitting: Moving experiments airlock "ShK" from Rassvet module to Nauka module forward port
- 6 May 2023 – **SpaceX Crew-6 redocking**
- 12 May 2023 – EVA 4 (VKD-58) Prokopyev/Petelin: 5 hrs, 14 mins
- 22 May 2023 – **Axiom Mission 2 docking (non-Expedition crew)**
- 24 May 2023 – Progress MS-23/84P docking
- 30 May 2023 – **Axiom Mission 2 undocking (non-Expedition crew)**
- 6 June 2023 – CRS SpX-28 docking
- 9 June 2023 – EVA 5 (US-87) Bowen/Hoburg: 6 hrs, 3 mins, installed the fifth iROSA at Array 1A
- 15 June 2023 – EVA 6 (US-88) Bowen/Hoburg: 5 hrs, 35 mins, installed the sixth and last iROSA at Array 1B
- 22 June 2023 – EVA 7 (VKD-59) Prokopyev/Petelin: 6 hrs, 24 mins
- 29 June 2023 – CRS SpX-28 undocking
- 4 August 2023 – CRS NG-19 capture and berthing
- 9 August 2023 – EVA 8 (VKD-60) Prokopyev/Petelin: 6 hrs, 35 mins
- 9 August 2023 – Relocation of Nauka outfitting: Moving European Robotic Arm's Portable Workpost from Rassvet module to Nauka module
- 20 August 2023 – Progress MS-22/83P undocking
- 25 August 2023 – Progress MS-24/85P docking
- 27 August 2023 – **SpaceX Crew-7 docking**
- 3 September 2023 – **SpaceX Crew-6 undocking**
- 15 September 2023 – **Soyuz MS-24 docking**
- 26 September 2023 – ISS Expedition 69/70 change of command ceremony from Sergey Prokopyev to Andreas Mogensen
- 27 September 2023 – **Soyuz MS-23 undocking, official switch to Expedition 70**

Next: Expedition 70

== Crew ==
Flight	Astronaut	Increment 69a	Increment 69b	Increment 69c	Increment 69d
Flight	Astronaut	28 Mar–27 Aug 2023	27 Aug–3 Sep 2023	3–15 Sep 2023	15–27 Sep 2023
Soyuz MS-23	Sergey Prokopyev, Roscosmos; Second spaceflight	Commander			
Soyuz MS-23	Dmitry Petelin, Roscosmos; First spaceflight	Flight engineer			
Soyuz MS-23	Francisco Rubio, NASA; First spaceflight	Flight engineer			
SpaceX Crew-6	Stephen Bowen, NASA; Fourth spaceflight	Flight engineer		Off station	
SpaceX Crew-6	Warren Hoburg, NASA; First spaceflight	Flight engineer		Off station	
SpaceX Crew-6	Sultan Al Neyadi, MBRSC; First spaceflight	Flight engineer		Off station	
SpaceX Crew-6	Andrey Fedyaev, Roscosmos; First spaceflight	Flight engineer		Off station	
SpaceX Crew-7	Jasmin Moghbeli, NASA; First spaceflight	Off station	Flight engineer		
SpaceX Crew-7	Andreas Mogensen, ESA; Second spaceflight	Off station	Flight engineer		
SpaceX Crew-7	Satoshi Furukawa, JAXA; Second and last spaceflight	Off station	Flight engineer		
SpaceX Crew-7	Konstantin Borisov, Roscosmos; First spaceflight	Off station	Flight engineer		
Soyuz MS-24	Oleg Kononenko, Roscosmos; Fifth spaceflight	Off station			Flight engineer
Soyuz MS-24	Nikolai Chub, Roscosmos; First spaceflight	Off station			Flight engineer
Soyuz MS-24	Loral O'Hara, NASA; First spaceflight	Off station			Flight engineer

== Vehicle manifest ==
Vehicle	Purpose	Port	Docking/Capture Date	Undocking Date
Vehicles inherited from Expedition 68
CRS NG-18	Cargo	Unity nadir	9 Nov 2022	21 Apr 2023
Progress MS-22	Cargo	Zvezda aft	11 Feb 2023	20 Aug 2023
Soyuz MS-23	Exp. 67/68/69 crew	Poisk zenith	24 Feb 2023	6 Apr 2023 (redock)
Soyuz MS-23	Exp. 67/68/69 crew	Prichal nadir	6 Apr 2023 (redock)	27 Sep 2023
SpaceX Crew-6 "Endeavour"	Exp. 68/69 crew	Harmony zenith	28 Feb 2023	6 May 2023 (redock)
SpaceX Crew-6 "Endeavour"	Exp. 68/69 crew	Harmony forward	6 May 2023 (redock)	3 Sep 2023
CRS SpX-27	Cargo	Harmony forward	16 Mar 2023	15 Apr 2023
Vehicles docked during Expedition 69
Ax-2	Visiting commercial mission	Harmony zenith	22 May 2023	30 May 2023
Progress MS-23	Cargo	Poisk zenith	24 May 2023	29 Nov 2023 (Exp. 70)
CRS SpX-28	Cargo	Harmony zenith	6 Jun 2023	29 Jun 2023
CRS NG-19	Cargo	Unity nadir	4 Aug 2023	22 Dec 2023 (Exp. 70)
Progress MS-24/85P	Cargo	Zvezda aft	25 Aug 2023	13 Feb 2024 (Exp. 70)
SpaceX Crew-7 "Endurance"	Exp. 69/70 crew	Harmony zenith	27 Aug 2023	11 Mar 2024 (Exp. 70)
Soyuz MS-24 "Antares"	Exp. 69/70 crew	Rasssvet nadir	15 Sep 2023	6 Apr 2024 (Exp. 70)

Segment	U.S. Orbital Segment				Russian Orbital Segment			
Period	Harmony forward	Harmony zenith	Harmony nadir	Unity nadir	Rassvet nadir	Prichal nadir	Poisk zenith	Zvezda aft
28 Mar-6 Apr 2023	CRS SpX-27	SpaceX Crew-6	Vacant	CRS NG-18	Vacant	Vacant	Soyuz MS-23	Progress MS-22
6-15 Apr 2023	CRS SpX-27	SpaceX Crew-6	Vacant	CRS NG-18	Vacant	Soyuz MS-23	Vacant	Progress MS-22
15-21 Apr 2023	Vacant	SpaceX Crew-6	Vacant	CRS NG-18	Vacant	Soyuz MS-23	Vacant	Progress MS-22
21 Apr-6 May 2023	Vacant	SpaceX Crew-6	Vacant	Vacant	Vacant	Soyuz MS-23	Vacant	Progress MS-22
6-22 May 2023	SpaceX Crew-6	Vacant	Vacant	Vacant	Vacant	Soyuz MS-23	Vacant	Progress MS-22
22-24 May 2023	SpaceX Crew-6	Ax-2	Vacant	Vacant	Vacant	Soyuz MS-23	Vacant	Progress MS-22
24-30 May 2023	SpaceX Crew-6	Ax-2	Vacant	Vacant	Vacant	Soyuz MS-23	Progress MS-23	Progress MS-22
30 May-6 Jun 2023	SpaceX Crew-6	Vacant	Vacant	Vacant	Vacant	Soyuz MS-23	Progress MS-23	Progress MS-22
6-29 Jun 2023	SpaceX Crew-6	CRS SpX-28	Vacant	Vacant	Vacant	Soyuz MS-23	Progress MS-23	Progress MS-22
29 Jun-4 Aug 2023	SpaceX Crew-6	Vacant	Vacant	Vacant	Vacant	Soyuz MS-23	Progress MS-23	Progress MS-22
4-20 Aug 2023	SpaceX Crew-6	Vacant	Vacant	CRS NG-19	Vacant	Soyuz MS-23	Progress MS-23	Progress MS-22
20-25 Aug 2023	SpaceX Crew-6	Vacant	Vacant	CRS NG-19	Vacant	Soyuz MS-23	Progress MS-23	Vacant
25-27 Aug 2023	SpaceX Crew-6	Vacant	Vacant	CRS NG-19	Vacant	Soyuz MS-23	Progress MS-23	Progress MS-24
27 Aug-3 Sep 2023	SpaceX Crew-6	SpaceX Crew-7	Vacant	CRS NG-19	Vacant	Soyuz MS-23	Progress MS-23	Progress MS-24
3-15 Sep 2023	Vacant	SpaceX Crew-7	Vacant	CRS NG-19	Vacant	Soyuz MS-23	Progress MS-23	Progress MS-24
15-27 Sep 2023	Vacant	SpaceX Crew-7	Vacant	CRS NG-19	Soyuz MS-24	Soyuz MS-23	Progress MS-23	Progress MS-24

The Prichal aft, forward, starboard, and aft ports all have yet to be used since the module originally docked to the station and are not included in the table.
