= Bowersox =

Bowersox is a surname. Notable people with the surname include:

- John E. Bowersox (1885–1936), American stage and silent film actor
- Ken Bowersox (born 1956), American engineer, United States Naval officer, and astronaut
- Crystal Bowersox (born 1985), American singer, songwriter, and actress
