= Barn door tracker =

Camera mount used for astrophotography

A barn door tracker, also known as a Haig or Scotch mount, is a device used to cancel out the diurnal motion of the Earth for the observation or photography of astronomical objects. It is a simple alternative to attaching a camera to a motorized equatorial mount.

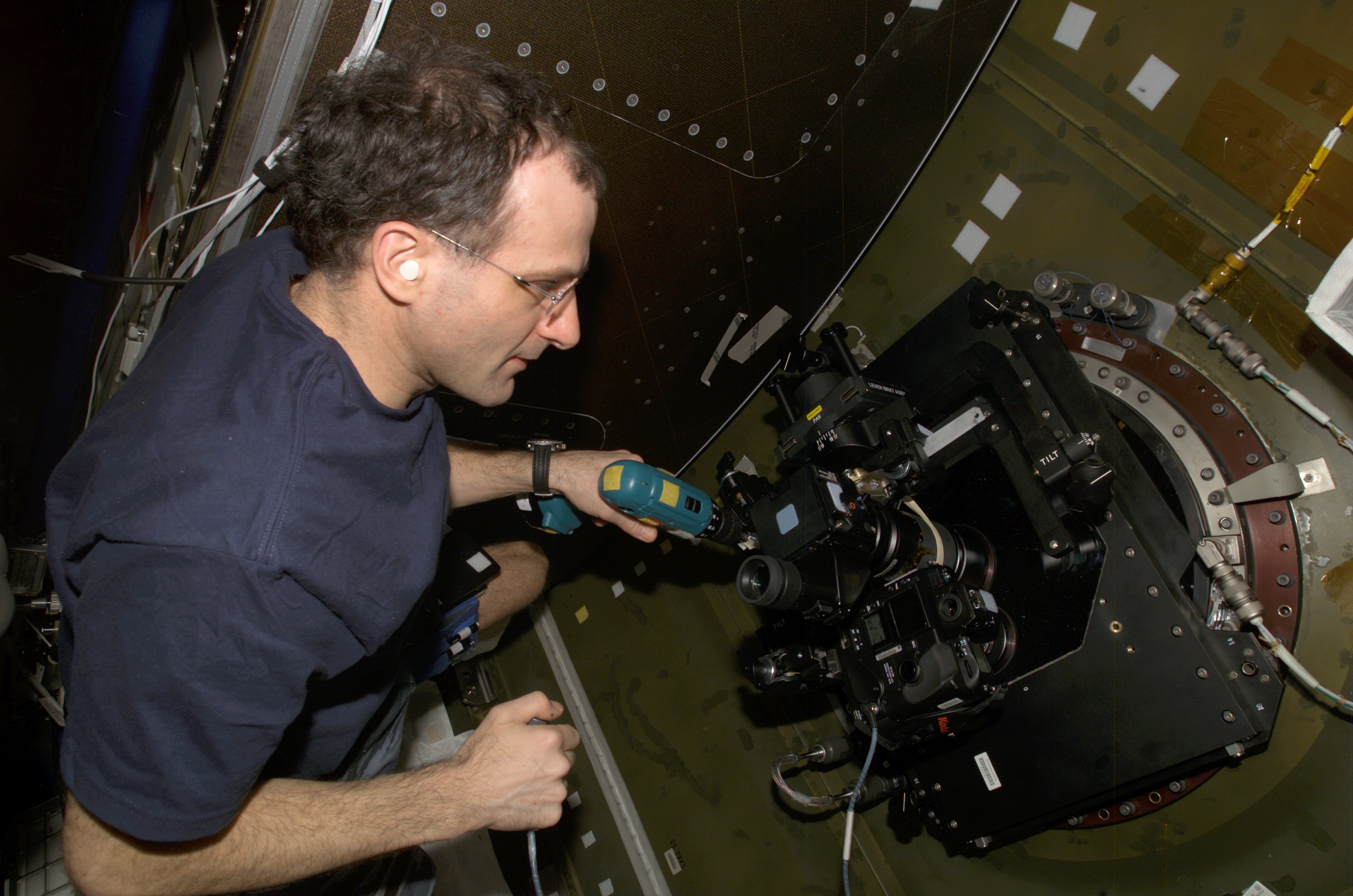
Astronaut Don Pettit operates a barn door tracker located in the Destiny lab of the International Space Station. He made the mount from spare parts he had accumulated from aboard the station.

== History ==
The barn door tracker was created by George Haig. His plans were first published in Sky & Telescope magazine in April 1975. Modified versions of the tracker were published in the magazine's February 1988 and June 2007 editions.

In late 2002 and early 2003, NASA astronaut Don Pettit, part of International Space Station Expedition 6, constructed a barn door tracker using spare parts he had accumulated from around the space station, permitting sharper high resolution images of city lights at night from the ISS.

Mount designs

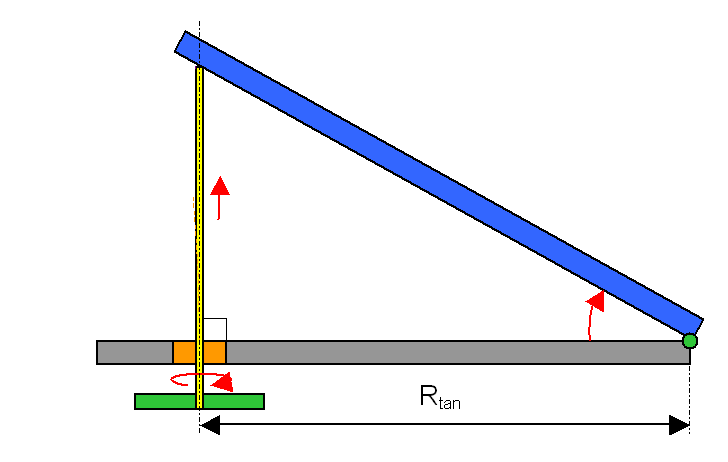
Haig (tangent) mount

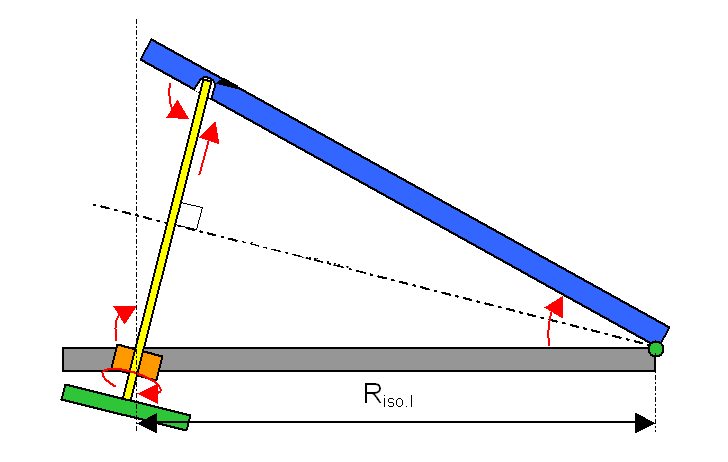
Isosceles mount

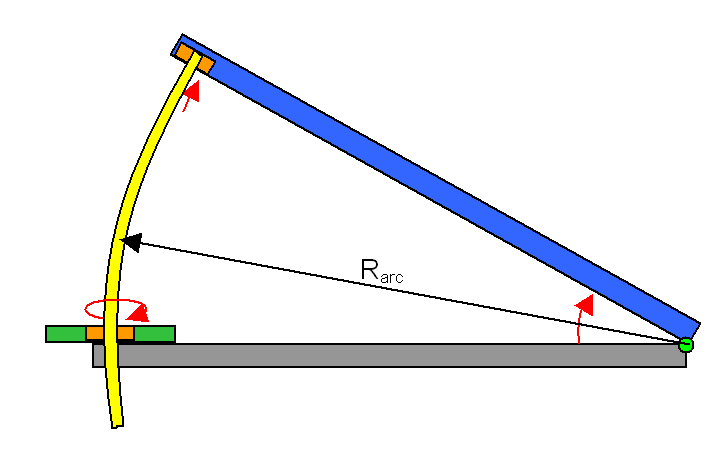
Curved rod mount

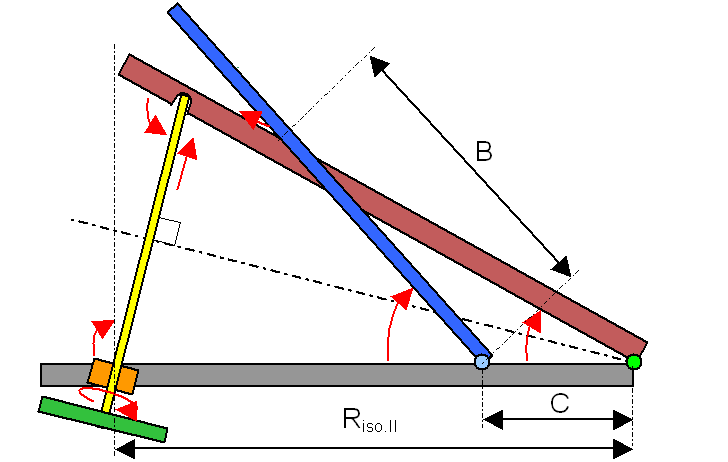
Double arm mount

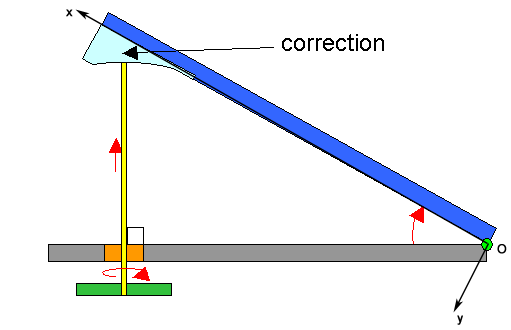
Scotch mount with corrective cam

== Mount design alternatives ==
A simple single-arm barn door tracker can be made by attaching two pieces of wood together with a hinge. A camera is mounted on the top board, usually with some sort of ball joint to allow the camera to be pointed in any direction. The hinge is aligned with a celestial pole and the boards are then driven apart (or together) at a constant rate, usually by turning a threaded rod or bolt. This is called a tangent drive.

This type of mount is good for approximately 5–10 minutes before tracking errors become evident when using a 50 mm lens. This is due to the tangent error. That length of time can be increased to about 20 minutes when using an isosceles mount. A curved drive bolt in lieu of either a straight tangent or isosceles mount will greatly extend the useful tracking time.

These designs were further improved upon by Dave Trott, whose designs were published in the February 1988 issue of Sky & Telescope. By using a second arm to drive the camera platform - making fabrication slightly less simple - tracking accuracy is greatly increased, allowing exposure times of up to one hour. The most accurate of these designs is Type-4. A modified double arm design minimizes tangent error by raising the point of rotation of the arm on which the camera is mounted. This has the effect of tilting the arc traced by the camera arm backwards causing it to follow a better path.

A basic geometrical analysis of the tangent error shows that it can be fully compensated for by inserting a specially shaped piece between the threaded rod and the top board. Such solution was already known for a long time before the original G. Haig publication.

The most basic of these designs are manually operated, even though an optional electric motor or stepper motor (considered in Trott's original design) automates and improves the accuracy of tracking, while considerably reducing the likelihood of platform vibrations that could result from manipulating the device; i.e., manually advancing the drive rod.

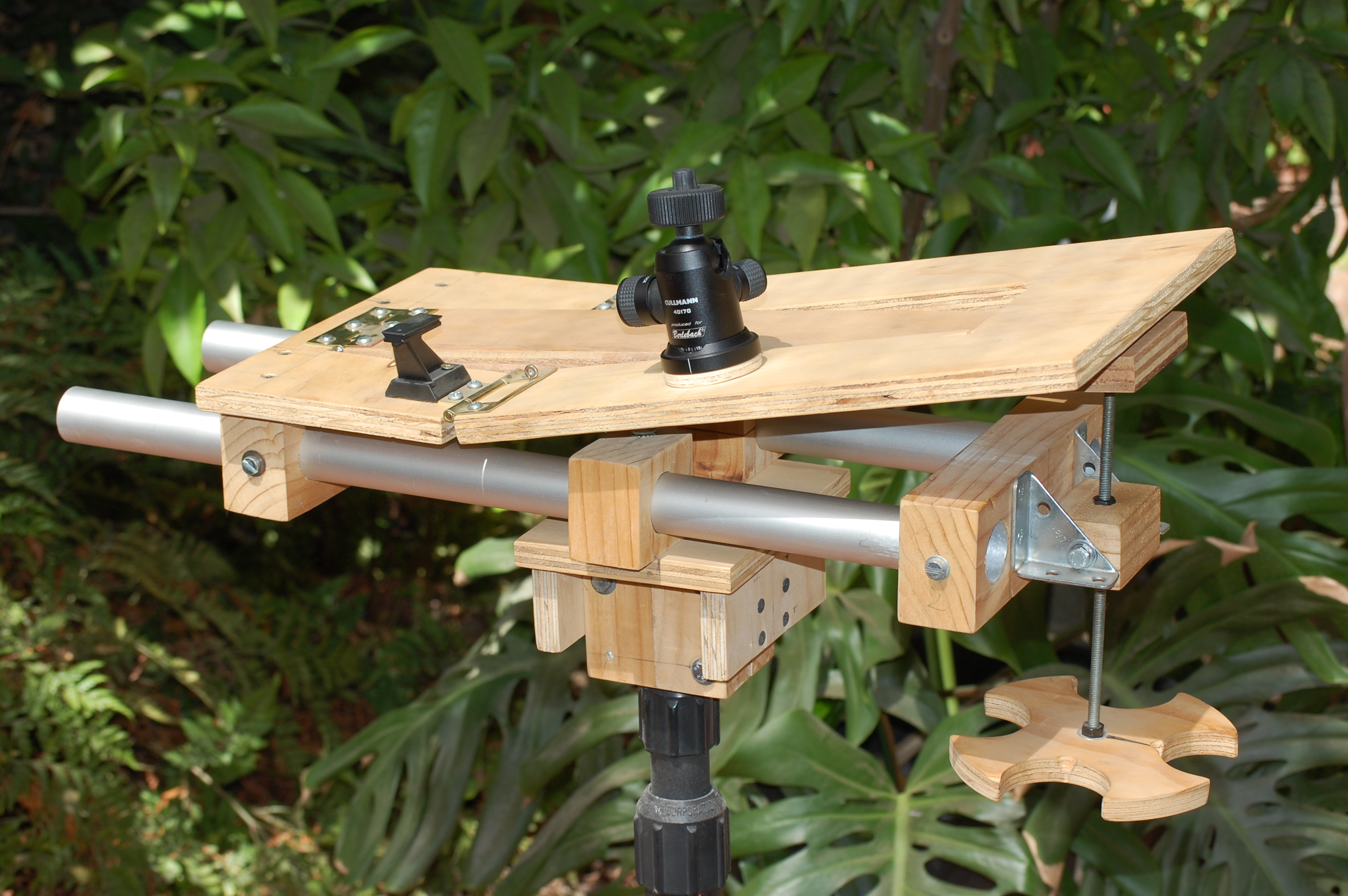
Improved type 4 barn door tracker for astro photography

== Double arm (Type 4) design and building plans ==
Reportedly, Dave Trott's two-arm Type 4 design can potentially reduce trailing error to 1 arc second per hour, allowing for very long trail-less exposures, even in combination with long (200mm +) lenses. However, detailed building plans have apparently never been published.
Ideally, this drive requires a 1 RPM stepper motor on a 1/4" 20 pitch drive rod, but for shorter exposures on a stable platform (tripod), a well designed type-4 barn-door tracker is supposed to produce very acceptable results even when manually advancing the drive in 15 or 10 second sequential steps in order to achieve one full revolution per minute.
Now, detailed 1:1 building plans by Gerard Prins for the design can be found at here. A key modification of the original design is the hinged suspension of the drive rod, which avoids binding, as well as a central tripod mount that can be moved along the supporting truss tubes to better balance for lighter or heavier loads according to their orientation.
For proper polar alignment, a 3-way tripod or azimuth wedge is required. The latter is not included in the design plan.
