= Donald Pettit =

American astronaut and engineer (born 1955)

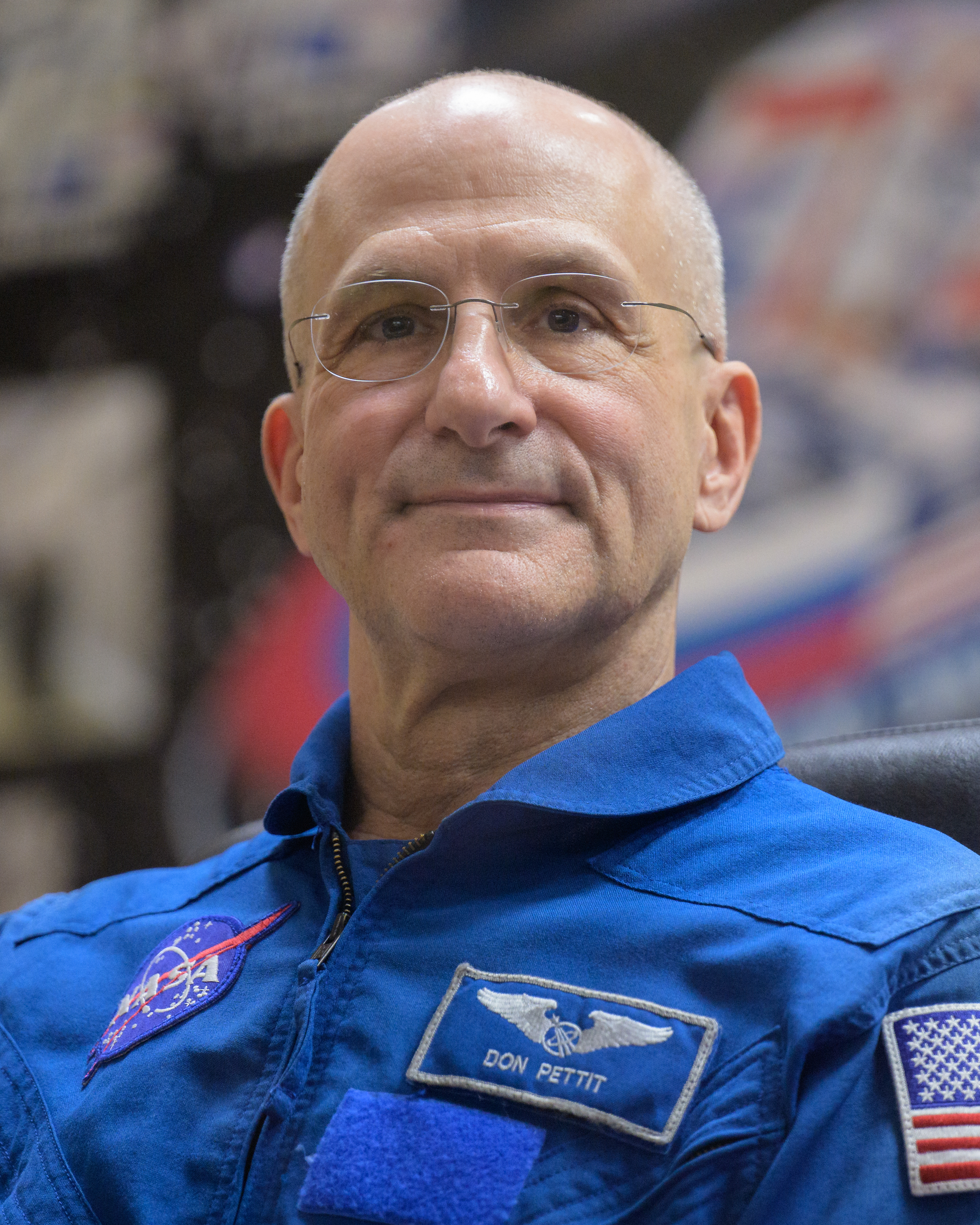
- Pettit in 2024
- Born: Donald Roy Pettit; April 20, 1955 (age 71); Silverton, Oregon, U.S.
- Education: Oregon State University (BS); University of Arizona (MS, PhD)
- Space career

NASA astronaut
- Time in space: 590 days, 1 hour, 38 minutes
- Selection: NASA Group 16 (1996)
- Total EVAs: 2
- Total EVA time: 13 hours, 17 minutes
- Missions: STS-113/Soyuz TMA-1 (Expedition 6); STS-126; Soyuz TMA-03M (Expedition 30/31); Soyuz MS-26 (Expedition 71/72)
- Mission insignia
- Scientific career
- Fields: Chemical engineering
- Thesis: Coherent Detection of Scattered Light by Submicrometer Aerosols (1983)
- Doctoral advisor: Thomas Peterson

Donald Roy Pettit (born April 20, 1955) is an American astronaut and chemical engineer best known for his orbital astrophotography and in-space inventions such as the Space Cup, which received the first ever patent for an object invented in space. He is a veteran of three long-duration missions aboard the International Space Station, one Space Shuttle mission, and a six-week expedition to find meteorites in Antarctica. As of 2026, at age 71, he is NASA's oldest active astronaut and the third oldest person to reach orbit, behind John Glenn and Larry Connor. He has accumulated 590 days in space.

== Early life and education ==
Pettit was born and raised in Silverton, Oregon. He is an Eagle Scout.

Pettit graduated from Oregon State University in 1978 with a Bachelor of Science in chemical engineering. He then did graduate study in chemical engineering at the University of Arizona, receiving a Ph.D. in 1983.

== NASA career ==
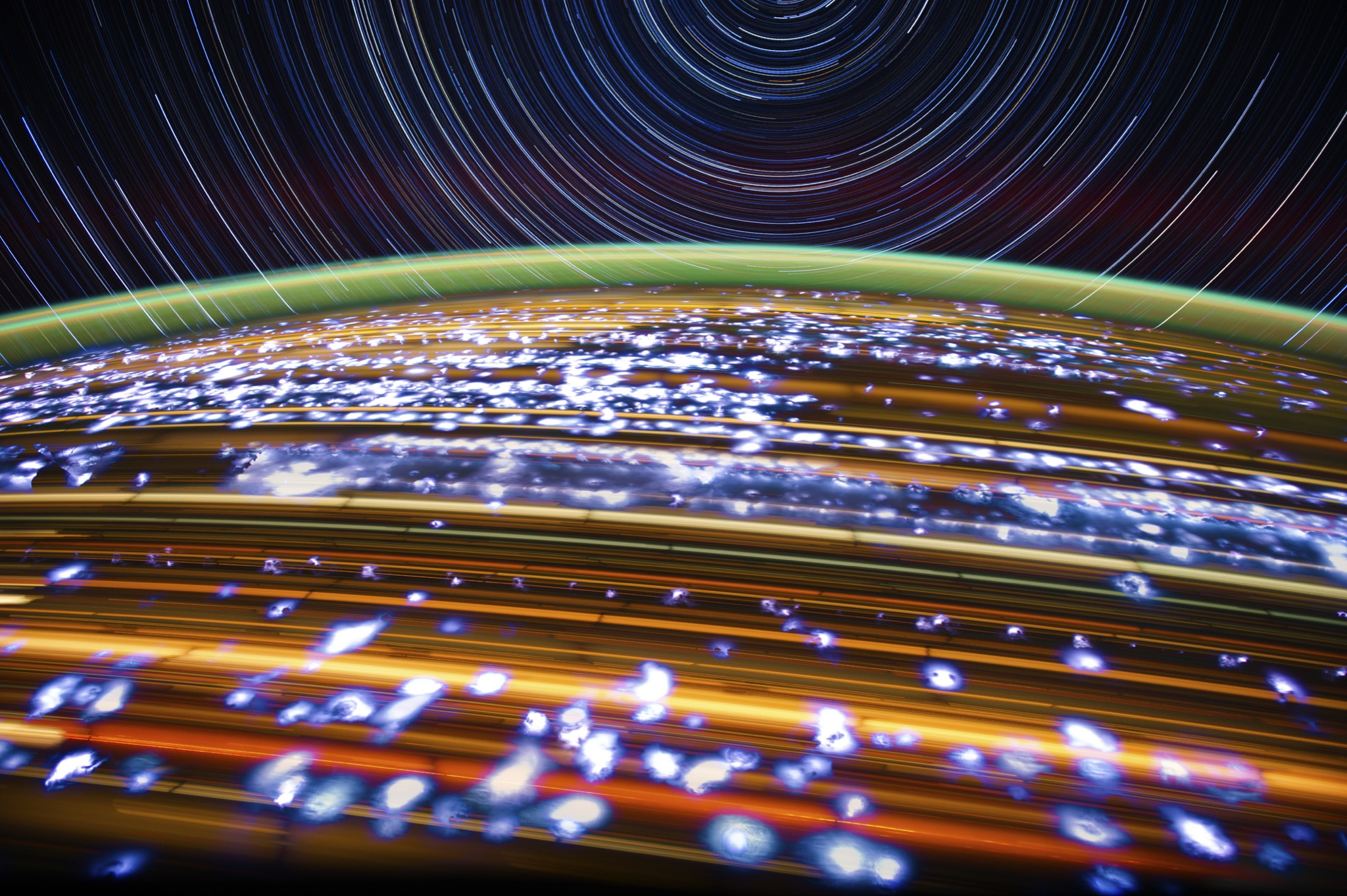
"Lightning Bugs', a star trail image taken by Pettit in 2012 that went viral

Pettit worked as a scientist at the Los Alamos National Laboratory from 1984 until 1996, when NASA selected him as an astronaut candidate. He was a junior advisor to the Synthesis Committee of the Space Exploration Initiative on its May 1991 report "America at the Threshold", recommending plans for a human mission to Mars.

As astrophotographer, Pettit has captured thousands of unique star trails and photographic data sets, which he regularly shares online. One, titled 'Lightning Bugs', went viral on the internet.

=== Spaceflight experience ===
==== Expedition 6 ====
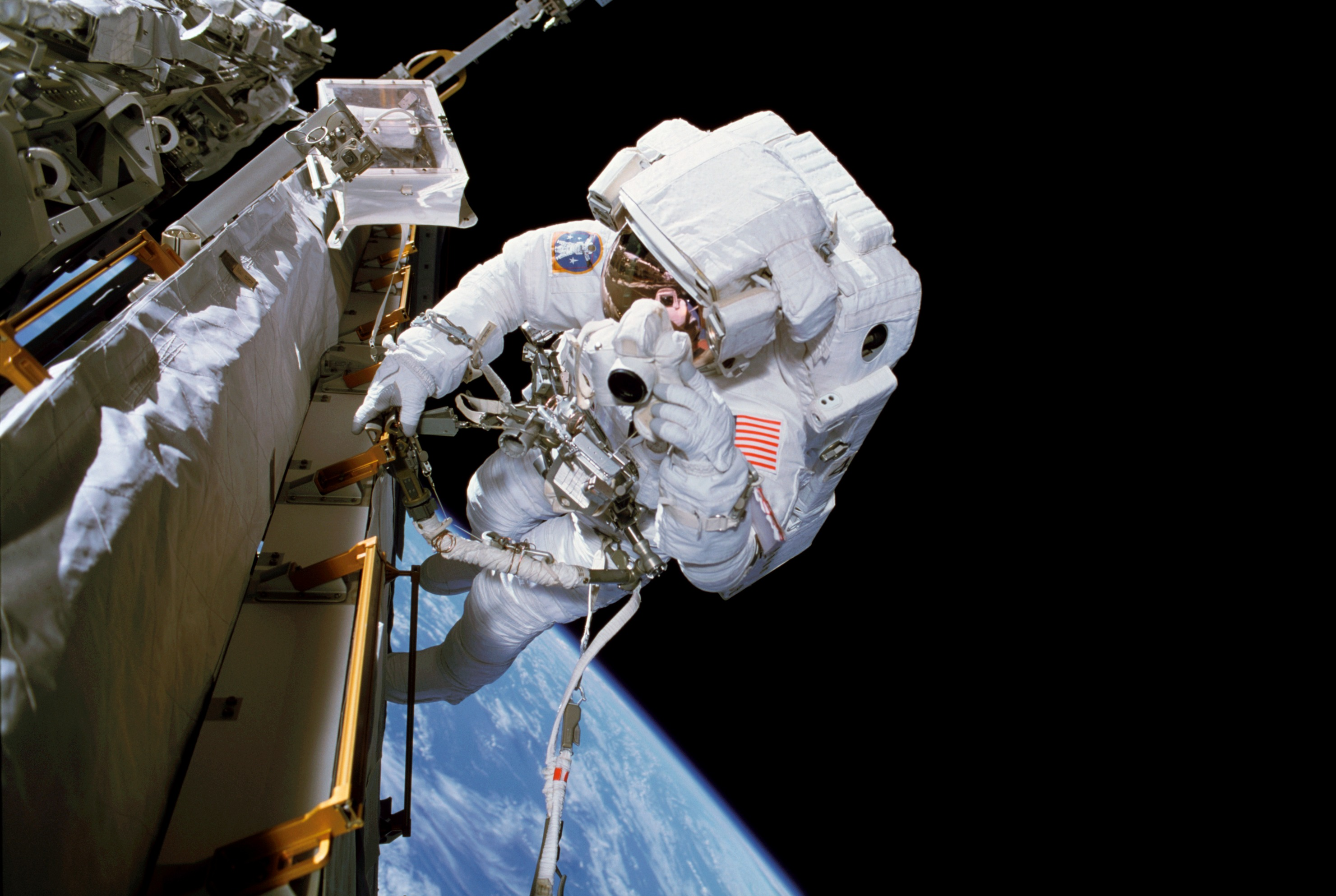
Pettit pictured during an EVA on Expedition 6

Pettit's first journey to space was as a flight engineer on Expedition 6, a long-duration mission aboard the International Space Station (ISS). Originally the backup for NASA astronaut Donald Thomas, Pettit was assigned to the mission just weeks before launch after Thomas was grounded due to medical concerns. The crew lifted off on November 24, 2002, aboard Space Shuttle Endeavour on mission STS-113.

During his time on the ISS, Pettit conducted two extravehicular activities (EVAs) to install external scientific equipment. He was not initially scheduled for a spacewalk but stepped in for Nikolai Budarin, who was removed from the task days before due to a medical issue. In his free time on ISS, Pettit created and filmed "Saturday Morning Science", a series of demonstrations exploring fluid behavior in microgravity.

The mission was extended by about two months after the Space Shuttle Columbia disaster on February 1, 2003, which led to the grounding of the shuttle fleet. Instead of returning on a shuttle as planned, the crew returned in the Russian Soyuz TMA-1 capsule on May 4, 2003, the first time NASA astronauts had landed in a Soyuz spacecraft.

Pettit's first Soyuz landing proved challenging. Concerned about potential radiation damage to his scientific film before a shuttle could retrieve it, he secured the materials in a 20-kilogram (44-pound) pack strapped to his chest. While a typical Soyuz descent subjects astronauts to 3 G's, guidance system failure during the Soyuz TMA's inaugural reentry caused a ballistic reentry, exposing the crew to over 8 G's. This intensified the pack's weight to approximately 160 kilograms (350 pounds), leaving Pettit exhausted and reportedly causing a shoulder dislocation. However, space agencies downplayed the incident, stating the astronauts were in good condition.

==== STS-126 ====
Pettit was a mission specialist on the STS-126, a short-duration mission on Space Shuttle Endeavour to deliver equipment and supplies to the ISS.

In his free time on ISS, Pettit performed experiments related to the clumping of solid particles in microgravity. The experiments showed that particles of various materials which varied in size between 1 micrometer and 6 millimeters naturally clumped together in microgravity when confined to a volume of 4 liters that included a few grams of the materials. The cause was theorized to be electrostatic. This presents a plausible mechanism for the initial stages of planetary formation, since particles of this size do not have sufficient gravity to cause this phenomenon.

==== Expedition 30/31 ====
Pettit again launched to the International Space Station on December 21, 2011, as part of the Expedition 30/31 crew. He and fellow crew members Oleg Kononenko and André Kuipers arrived at the ISS on December 23. Among his off-duty video demonstrations on the space station has been on water as thin film and the Marangoni convection. On May 25, 2012, Pettit operated the Canadarm2 to grapple the first SpaceX Dragon 1 and berth it to the Harmony module. During the capture, he was quoted saying, "Houston, Station, we've got us a dragon by the tail."

This marked the first time a private spacecraft had ever rendezvoused with the ISS. The Dragon capsule was carrying supplies for the ISS, and the successful capture demonstrated the feasibility of using privately developed spacecraft to resupply the station. Pettit was the first to enter the uncrewed supply ship on May 26, making him the first astronaut in the history of space exploration to successfully enter a commercially-built and operated spacecraft in orbit.

===== Angry Birds Space Demos =====
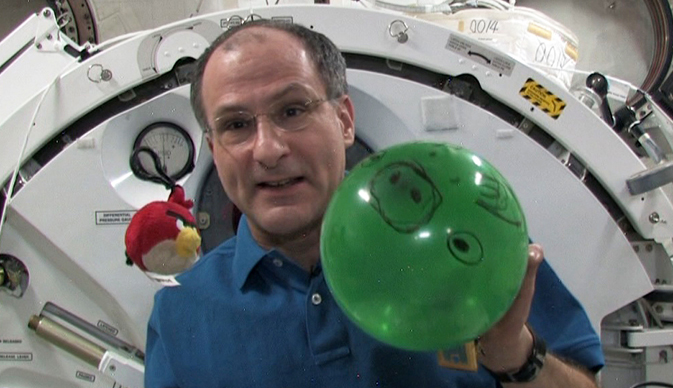
Pettit demonstrates microgravity using characters from 'Angry Birds'.

During Expedition 30, on behalf of NASA in cooperation with Finland-based Rovio Entertainment, creator of the Angry Birds franchise, Pettit made a video by using an Angry Birds character to explain how physics works in space, including demonstrating trajectories in microgravity by catapulting a Red Bird through the space station.

NASA states that such collaboration may share the excitement of space with the game community, educate users on NASA's programs, and create interactive educational experiences for the public.

The footage was released by NASA both on its official site and YouTube along with another commercial version by Rovio on March 8, 2012, to announce the launch of new game Angry Birds Space on March 22, 2012.

==== Expedition 71/72 ====
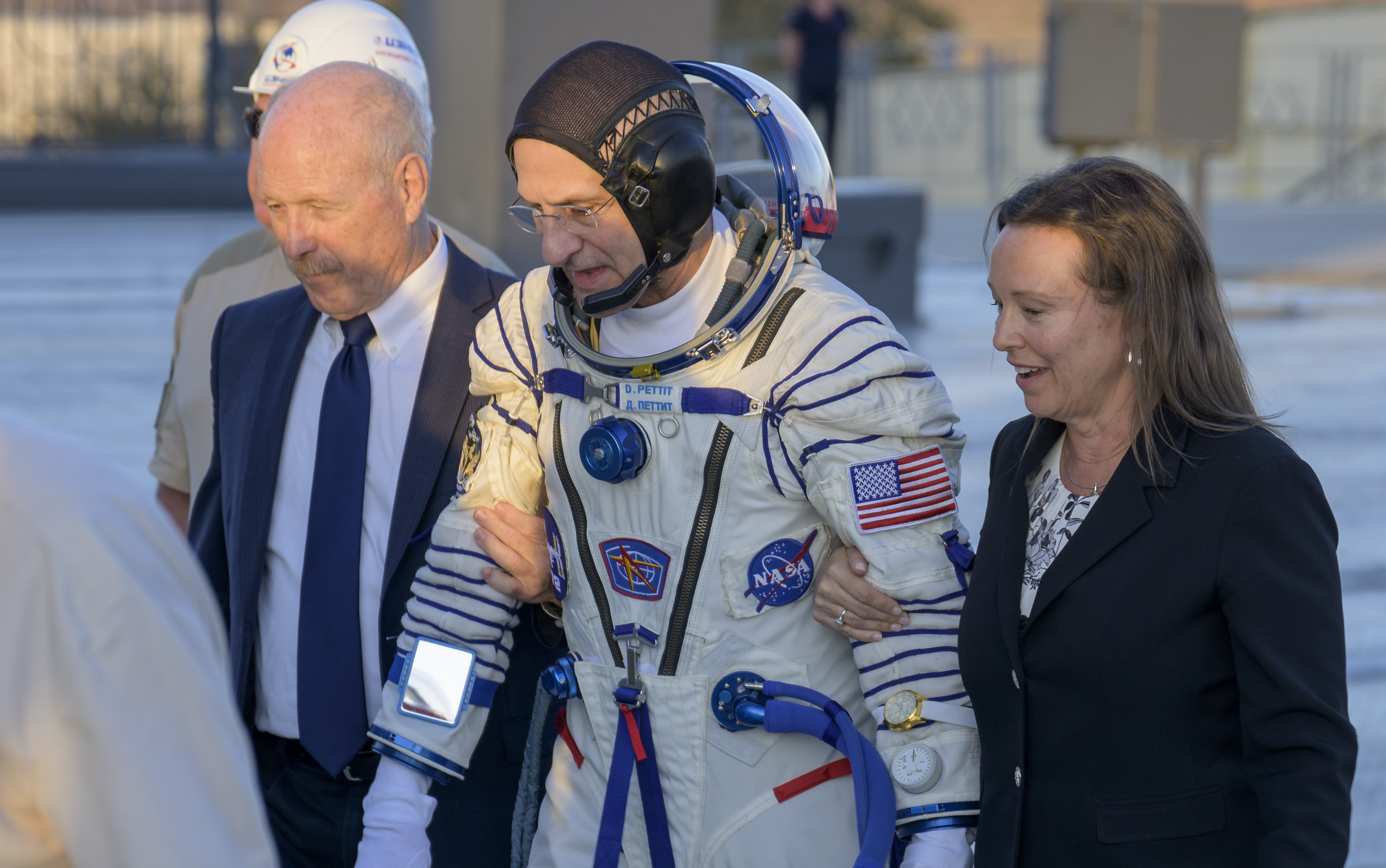
NASA Associate Administrator Ken Bowersox (left) and NASA ISS Program Deputy Manager Dina Contella (right) walk Pettit to Soyuz MS-26. Bowersox was also Pettit's commander on Expedition 6.

On September 11, 2024, Pettit launched aboard Soyuz MS-26 alongside Russian cosmonauts Aleksey Ovchinin and Ivan Vagner. The trio joined the crews of Expedition 71 and later Expedition 72 for a mission aboard the ISS lasting 220 days. During their mission, the crew orbited Earth 3,520 times, traveling approximately 93.3 million miles. Pettit conducted scientific investigations on behalf of NASA, including studies on water purification technology, plant growth in microgravity, and fire behavior in space. He also continued to share his astrophotography work to acclaim on social media.

The mission concluded on April 20, 2025, with the safe landing of Soyuz MS-26 on the Kazakh Steppe on Pettit's 70th birthday, making him NASA's oldest active-duty astronaut to return from space. As recovery teams assisted the crew from the capsule, Pettit appeared disoriented, a sensation he had anticipated due to prior experiences with readjustment to gravity. NASA said after the landing that Pettit was doing well and was flown to NASA's Johnson Space Center in Houston for normal post-flight evaluation and rehabilitation.

== Innovations and inventions ==
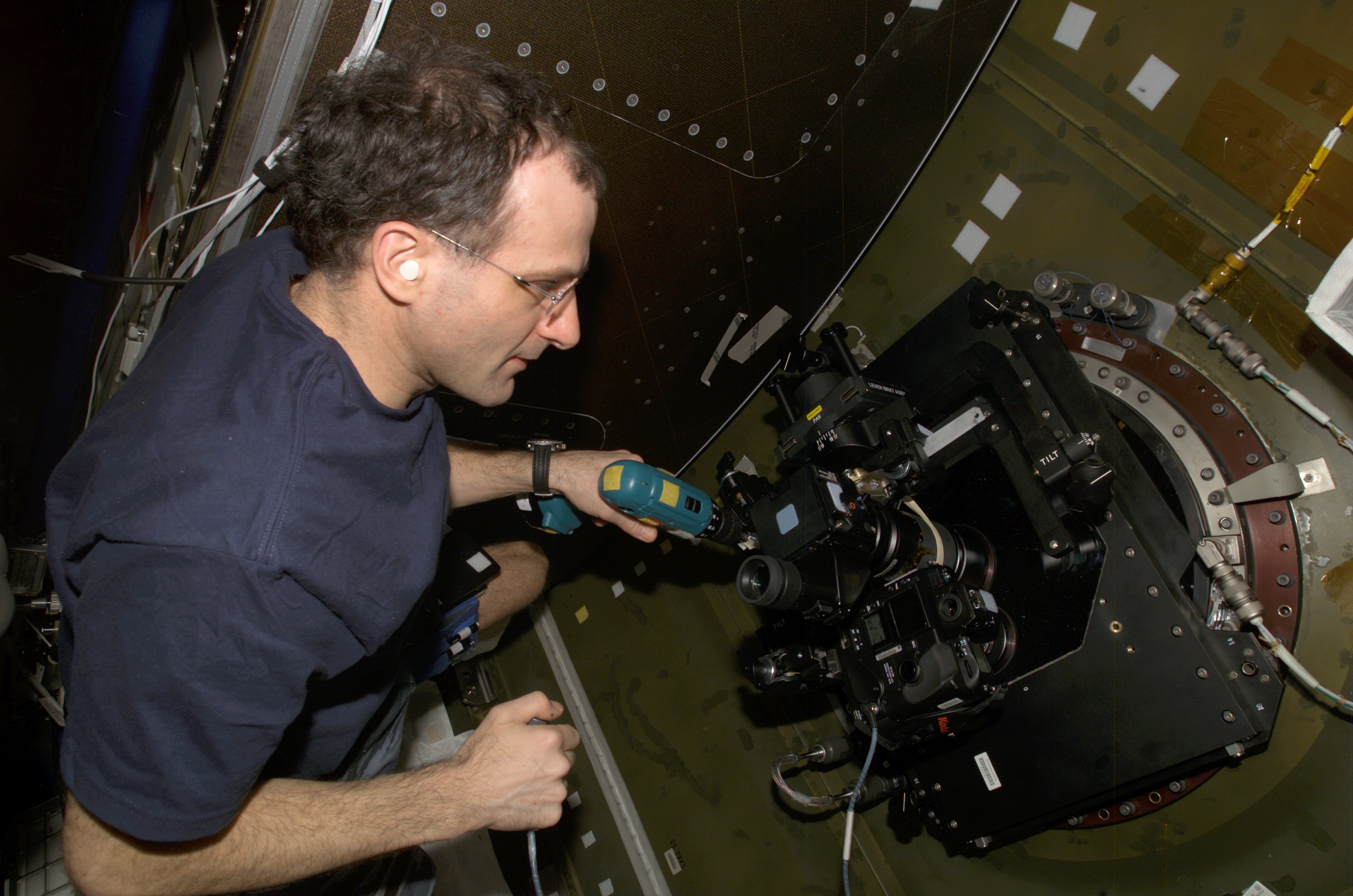
Astronaut Pettit operates the barn door tracker he constructed for ISS-based photography of the Earth's surface.

During Expedition 6, Pettit used spare parts found throughout the Station to construct a barn door tracker; the device compensates for the movement of the ISS relative to the Earth's surface, permitting sharper high resolution images of city lights at night from the orbiting space station.

In November 2008, Pettit invented the Space Cup, which used the principle of capillary channel flow to carry fluid along a crease to permit drinking and avoid the necessity of a straw. The first prototype was developed on the ISS using repurposed materials pinched into a teardrop shape. This zero-g cup was featured in the May 2009 issue of National Geographic magazine, along with his notes on the relation of the internal cup angle to the contact wetting angle for various construction materials. The cup received the first ever patent for an object invented in space.

== Antarctica ==
From November 2006 through January 2007, Pettit joined the Antarctic Search for Meteorites (ANSMET), spending six weeks in the Antarctic summer collecting meteorite samples, including a lunar meteorite. During the expedition, he was called on to perform emergency electrical repairs to a snowmobile and emergency dental surgery. Periods of tent-confining inclement weather were spent continuing his Saturday Morning Science series—"on Ice"—with photographic surveys of crystal sizes of glacial ice samples and collections of magnetic micrometeorites from ice melt used for cooking water. He estimated Antarctic glacial ice to contain roughly 1 micrometeorite per liter.
