= Nikolai Budarin =

Russian cosmonaut (born 1953)

- Николай Бударин
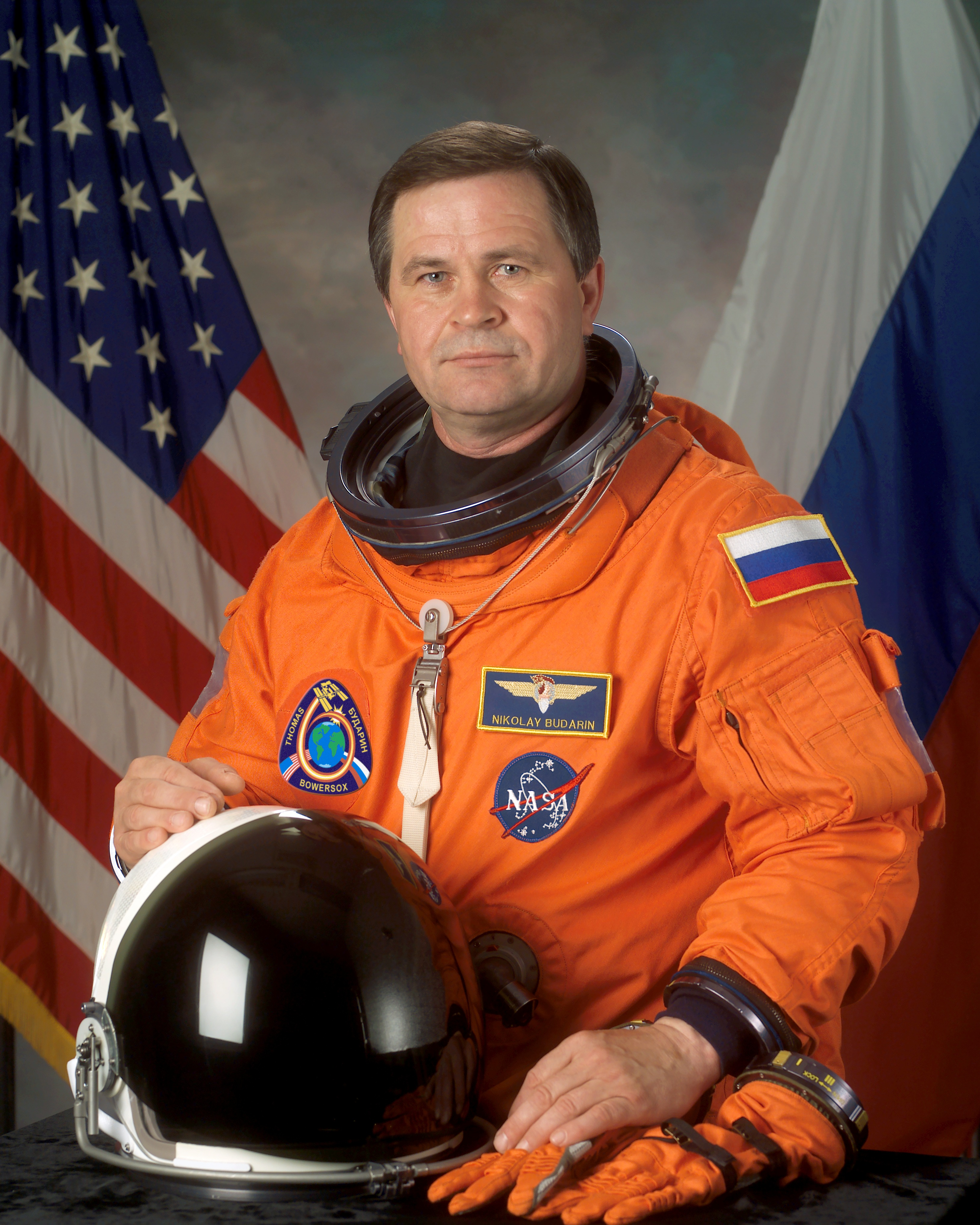
- Budarin in 2002
- Born: Nikolai Mikhailovich Budarin; 29 April 1953 (age 73); Kirya, Chuvashia, Russian SFSR, Soviet Union
- Occupation: Mechanical Engineer
- Awards: Hero of the Russian Federation
- Space career

Roscosmos cosmonaut
- Status: Retired
- Time in space: 444 days, 1 hour, 25 minutes
- Selection: NPOE-9 Cosmonaut Group (1989)
- Total EVAs: 8
- Total EVA time: 44 hours, 25 minutes
- Missions: STS-71/Soyuz TM-21 (Mir EO-19); Soyuz TM-27 (Mir EO-25); STS-113/Soyuz TMA-1 (Expedition 6)
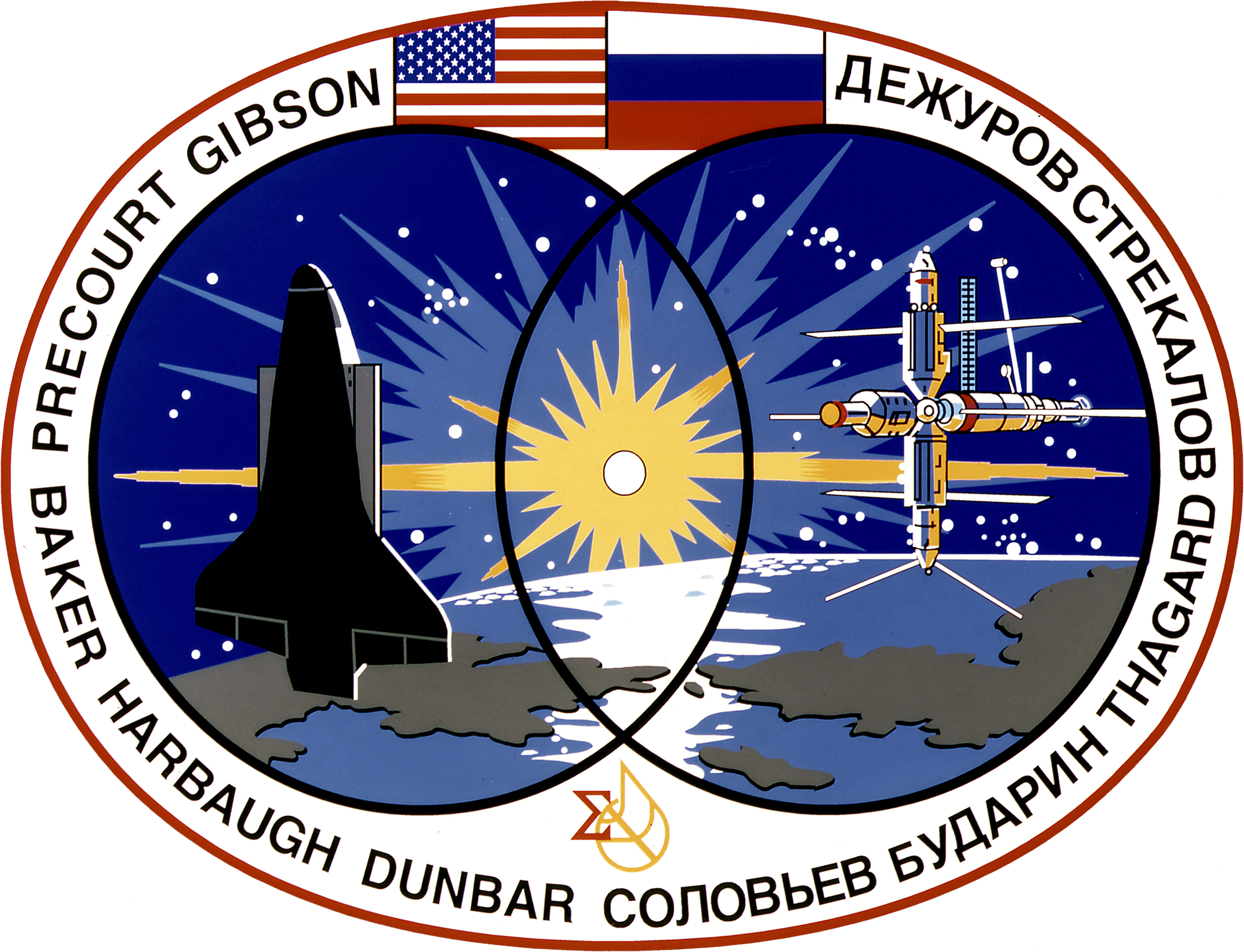
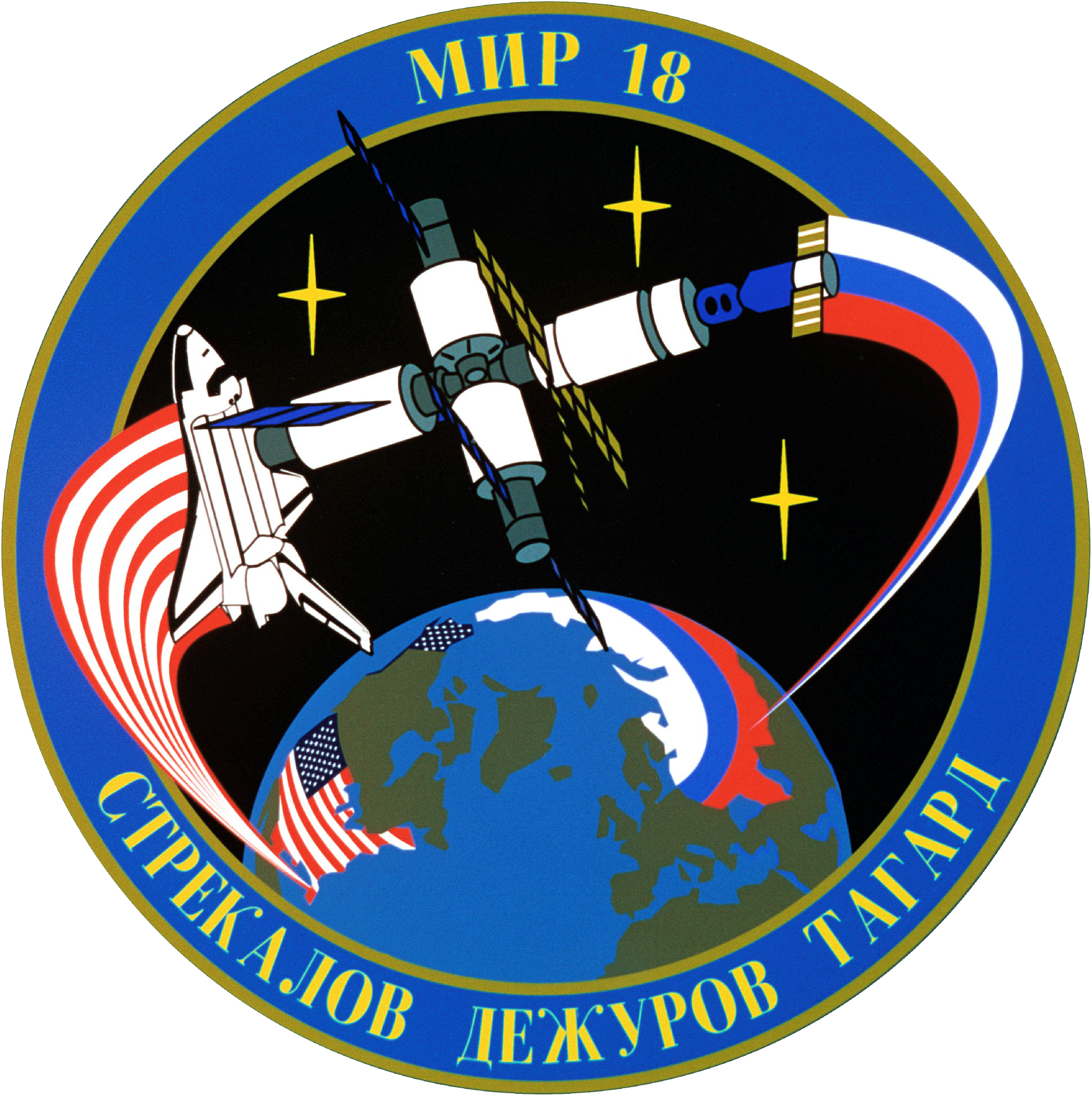
- Mission insignia
- Retired: September 7, 2004

Nikolai Mikhailovich Budarin (Russian: Николай Михайлович Бударин) (born 29 April 1953) is a retired Russian cosmonaut, a veteran of three extended space missions aboard the Mir Space Station and the International Space Station. He has also performed eight career spacewalks with a total time of 44 hours.

Named a cosmonaut candidate in 1989, Budarin's first space mission was a long-term assignment aboard the space station Mir in 1995. Since then, he again made extended stays on Mir in 1998 and the International Space Station Expedition 6 from 2002 to 2003.

== Personal data ==
Nikolai Budarin is married to Marina Lvovna Budarina (née Sidorenko). They have two sons, Dmitry born in 1977 and Vladislav, born in 1983. His hobbies include fishing, skiing, picking mushrooms, tourism and cycling. His father, Mikhail Romanovich Budarin, died in 1984. His mother, Alexandra Mikhailovna Budarina, died in 1986.

Since 2007 he is a member of the Russian parliament, the State Duma, representing the pro-Kremlin United Russia party.

== Education ==
Specializing in aircraft manufacturing, Budarin graduated from the night-time education department of Ordzhonikidze Moscow Aviation Institute in 1979 with a mechanical engineering diploma.

== Awards and honours ==
- Hero of the Russian Federation (5 October 1995) - for courage and heroism displayed during prolonged space flight on the orbital scientific research complex Mir
- Pilot-Cosmonaut of the Russian Federation (1995)
- Order of Merit for the Fatherland;
  - 2nd class (25 September 2004) - for services to the state in space exploration and for his courage and professionalism
  - 3rd class (25 December 1998) - for courage and selflessness shown during spaceflight on the orbital scientific research complex Mir
- Medal "For Merit in Space Exploration" (12 April 2011) - for the great achievements in the field of research, development and use of outer space, many years of diligent work, public activities
- Order Otan (Kazakhstan, 11 November 1998)
- Three NASA Space Flight Medals

== Experience ==
From 1971 to 1973 Budarin was serving the Soviet Army in Czechoslovakia. Budarin occupied various engineering positions at NPO Energia where he was involved in experimental investigations and testing of space technology. From 1976 he was employed as an electrician, from 1978 as an electrical foreman, from 1982 as a test engineer, from 1986 as the head of a group, from 1988 until joining the cosmonauts corps as the lead specialist, head of a group at the NPO Energia check-out and testing facility.

== Cosmonaut career ==
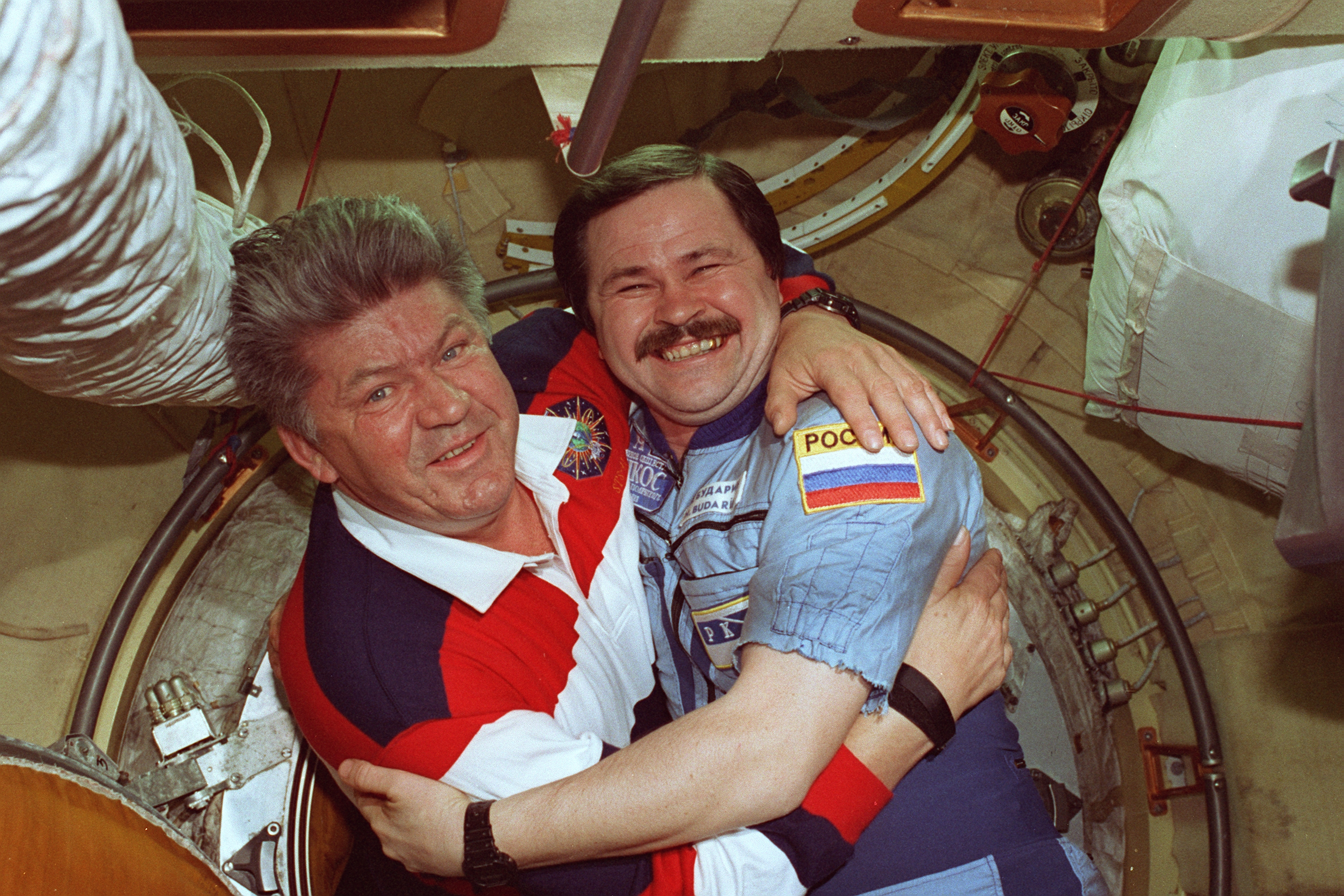
Cosmonauts Nikolai Budarin and Valery Ryumin (left) reunite moments after hatch opening, following docking of Mir and Space Shuttle Discovery.

In February 1989 he was enrolled in the Energia cosmonaut detachment as a candidate test cosmonaut. From September 1989 to January 1991, he underwent a complete basic space training course at the Gagarin Cosmonaut Training Center and passed a State examination and was qualified as a Test Cosmonaut. From February 1991 to December 1993, he took an advanced training course for the Soyuz-TM transport vehicle and the Mir Station flight. From May 1994 till February 1995 he completed training as the flight engineer of the backup crew of Soyuz TM-21 under Expedition-18/NASA-1 program, and, simultaneously, as the flight engineer of the main crew of Mir under Expedition-19 (Mir EO-19) program. From 27 March till May 1995, Budarin was trained for a mission under Mir EO-19 program as the flight engineer of the first crew, and from 15 May to 26 June, he trained for the STS-71 mission in the United States.

=== Mir EO-19 ===
From 27 June to 11 September 1995, Budarin participated in a space mission as a board engineer of the 19th long-term Mir expedition. He was launched into space by Space Shuttle Atlantis on the STS-71 mission. Atlantis lifted off from the Kennedy Space Center at 19:32:19 UTC on 27 June 1995. After 2 days of solo flight the space shuttle docked with the Mir station on 29 June 1995, at 13:00:16 UTC. Budarin spent 75 days, 11 hours and 20minutes in space and landed on the Soyuz TM-21 spacecraft. The Soyuz capsule carrying Budarin and cosmonaut Anatoly Solovyev landed on 11 September 1995 at 06:52:40 UTC, 108 km north east of Arkalyk.

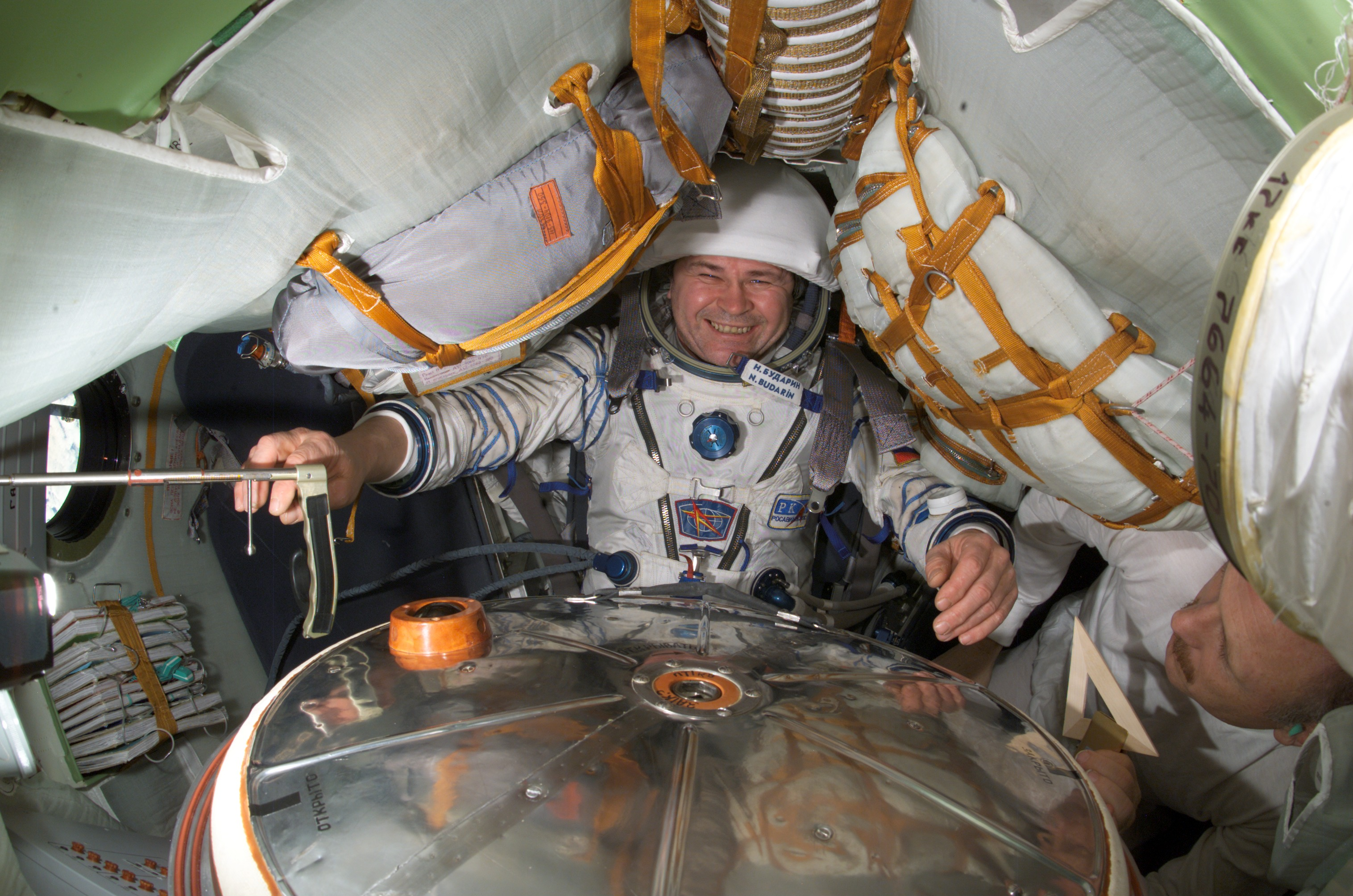
Nikolai Budarin, Expedition 6 flight engineer, is pictured in a Soyuz spacecraft that is docked to the ISS.

=== Mir EO-25 ===
From 28 January to 25 August 1998, he participated in a space mission as a board engineer of the 25th long-term expedition aboard the Mir orbital station. The Soyuz TM-27 spacecraft with Budarin, cosmonaut Talgat Musabayev and ESA astronaut Léopold Eyharts lifted off from the Baikonur Cosmodrome on 29 January 1998, at 16:33:42 UTC. Following a two-day autonomous flight the Soyuz spacecraft docked with the Mir station on 31 January 1998. Musabayev and Budarin together with NASA astronaut Andy Thomas became the 25th resident crew of Mir. First in the focus of the crew was the French mission PEGASE which was mainly dedicated to the life sciences, physical sciences physiques and space technology. They also worked on common scientific experiments. Soyuz TM-27 carrying Budarin, Musabayev and Yuri Baturin landed near Dzhezkazgan on 25 August 1998 at 05:24:44 UTC. During the Soyuz and Mir missions Budarin spent 207 days, 12 hours and 51 minutes in space.

=== Expedition 6 ===
From 23 November 2002 to 3 May 2003, Budarin logged 161 days, 1 hour and 14 minutes in space as an Expedition 6 flight engineer aboard the International Space Station. The Expedition 6 crew was launched by Space Shuttle Endeavour on the STS-113 mission. Endeavour launched into space from the KSC LC-39A on 24 November 2002, at 00:49:47 UTC and docked with the International Space Station (ISS) on 25 November 2002 at 21:59 UTC. During the stay aboard the ISS, Budarin spent time between several Russian science and medical experiments. One experiment called Diatomeya involved observation of ocean surface in order to determine regions best suited for fishing. Another was to monitor glacier dynamics from space to better understand the effects of global warming. The medical research he conducted studied the effects of microgravity on the human body. Budarin returned to Earth onboard the Soyuz TMA-1 spacecraft with NASA astronauts Kenneth Bowersox and Donald Pettit. The capsule landed on 4 May 2003 at 02:04:25 UTC and following a ballistic trajectory. A technical commission was established to find the cause of the problem. It revealed that the cause of switching to the ballistic descent mode was an inadequate reaction of the descent control unit within the descent control system to the signals from gyroscope and the angular rate meter.

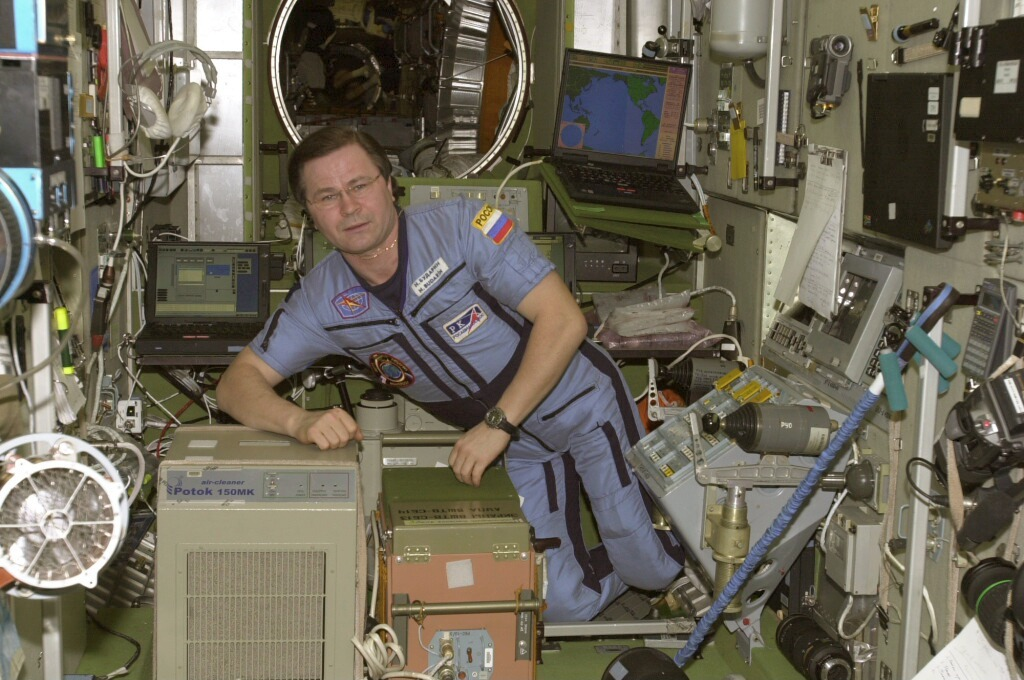
Nikolai Budarin inside the Zvezda Module of the ISS.

=== Spacewalks ===
During his two visits to the Mir orbital station, Budarin performed eight spacewalks totaling 44 hours.

On 14 July 1995, Budarin conducted his first career spacewalk joined by fellow cosmonaut, Anatoly Solovyev. The two spacewalkers deployed the Spektr solar array and inspected the docking port. The spacewalk lasted 5 hours and 34 minutes.

On 19 July 1995, Budarin conducted his second career spacewalk along with Anatoly Solovyev. The two prepared for MIRAS spectrometer deployment and retrieved the TREK experiment and changed exposure materials. The spacewalk lasted 3 hours and 8 minutes.

Two days later on 21 July, Budarin conducted his third career spacewalk, again with Solovyev. During the 5 hour 35 minute EVA, the two installed the MIRAS spectrometer.

On 1 April 1998, Budarin conducted his fourth career spacewalk. He and fellow cosmonaut Talgat Musabayev started repairing a solar panel damaged in the collision between Mir and the Progress M-34 supply ship. The spacewalk started at 13:35 UTC and ended at 20:15 UTC, lasting 6 hours and 40 minutes.

On 6 April 1998, Budarin conducted his fifth career spacewalk, with Talgat Musabayev. The two completed the repair work on the broken Spektr solar panel. The spacewalk lasted 4 hours and 15 minutes. While the two spacewalkers were struggling with installing a brace on the solar panel, Mir suddenly went to free drift and began turning away from the sun. The two were ordered to rush through the final bracing procedure and then perform an expedited entry. The spacewalk was originally planned for 3 March, but the crew was unable to open the EVA hatch leading to space, which necessitated the rescheduling of the spacewalk. Budarin failed to open the last of the 10 locks that was closed so tightly and in the process he broke three wrenches.

On 11 April 1998, Budarin conducted his sixth career spacewalk. Along with Talgat Musabayev, the two removed Mir's VDU. The spacewalk lasted 6 hours and 25 minutes.

On 17 April 1998, Budarin conducted his seventh career spacewalk. During a 6-hour 33 minute spacewalk, Budarin and Talgat Musabayev installed a new VDU which was delivered by Progress M-38. The spacewalk lasted 6 hours and 33 minutes.

Five days later on 22 April, Budarin completed his eighth career spacewalk. He and Musabayev completed the new VDU installation. The spacewalk lasted 6 hours and 21 minutes.

During Expedition 6, on 15 January 2003, Budarin was supposed to join NASA astronaut Kenneth Bowersox in a six-hour spacewalk outside the ISS. However, after failing to meet U.S standards in tests on a stationary bicycle in December 2002, NASA barred him from making a spacewalk citing medical reasons. The claim was rejected by the Russian authorities, which pronounced Budarin was healthy despite NASA concerns about cardiovascular "peculiarities". They said that the peculiarities of Budarin's cardiovascular system were known to the authorities and that Budarin had them on previous flights as well. The spacewalk was eventually carried out by NASA astronauts Bowersox and Donald Pettit.

== See also ==
- List of Heroes of the Russian Federation
