= Soyuz MS-26 =

2024 Russian crewed spaceflight to the ISS

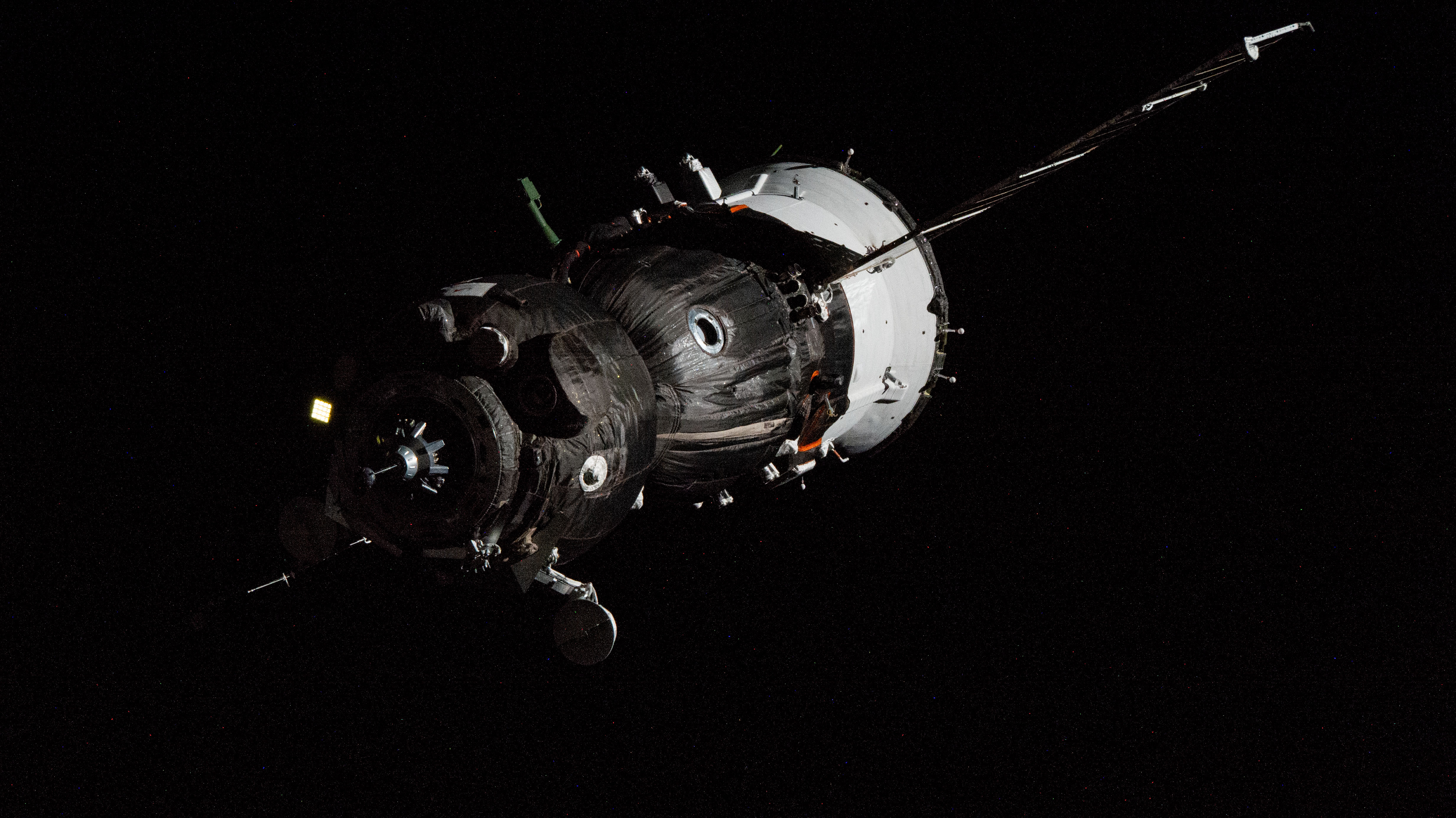
- Soyuz MS-26 approaches the International Space Station
- Names: ISS 72S
- Mission type: ISS crew transport
- Operator: Roscosmos
- COSPAR ID: 2024-162A
- SATCAT no.: 61043
- Mission duration: 220 days, 8 hours and 57 minutes
- Distance travelled: 150,200,000 km (93,300,000 mi)
- Orbits completed: 3,520

Spacecraft properties
- Spacecraft: Soyuz MS-26 No. 757
- Spacecraft type: Soyuz MS
- Manufacturer: Energia
- Launch mass: 7,152 kg (15,767 lb)

Crew
- Crew size: 3
- Members: Aleksey Ovchinin; Ivan Vagner; Donald Pettit
- Callsign: Burlak
- Expedition: Expedition 71/72

Start of mission
- Launch date: 11 September 2024, 16:23:12 UTC (21:23:12 AQTT)
- Rocket: Soyuz-2.1a No. M15000-070
- Launch site: Baikonur, Site 31/6
- Contractor: RKTs Progress

End of mission
- Landing date: 20 April 2025 01:20:35 UTC
- Landing site: Kazakh Steppe, 147 km (91 mi) southeast of Zhezkazgan, Kazakhstan (47°19′N 69°33′E)

Orbital parameters
- Reference system: Geocentric orbit
- Regime: Low Earth orbit
- Inclination: 51.66°

Docking with ISS
- Docking port: Rassvet nadir
- Docking date: 11 September 2024, 19:32:09 UTC
- Undocking date: 19 April 2025, 21:57:33 UTC
- Time docked: 220 days, 2 hours and 25 minutes
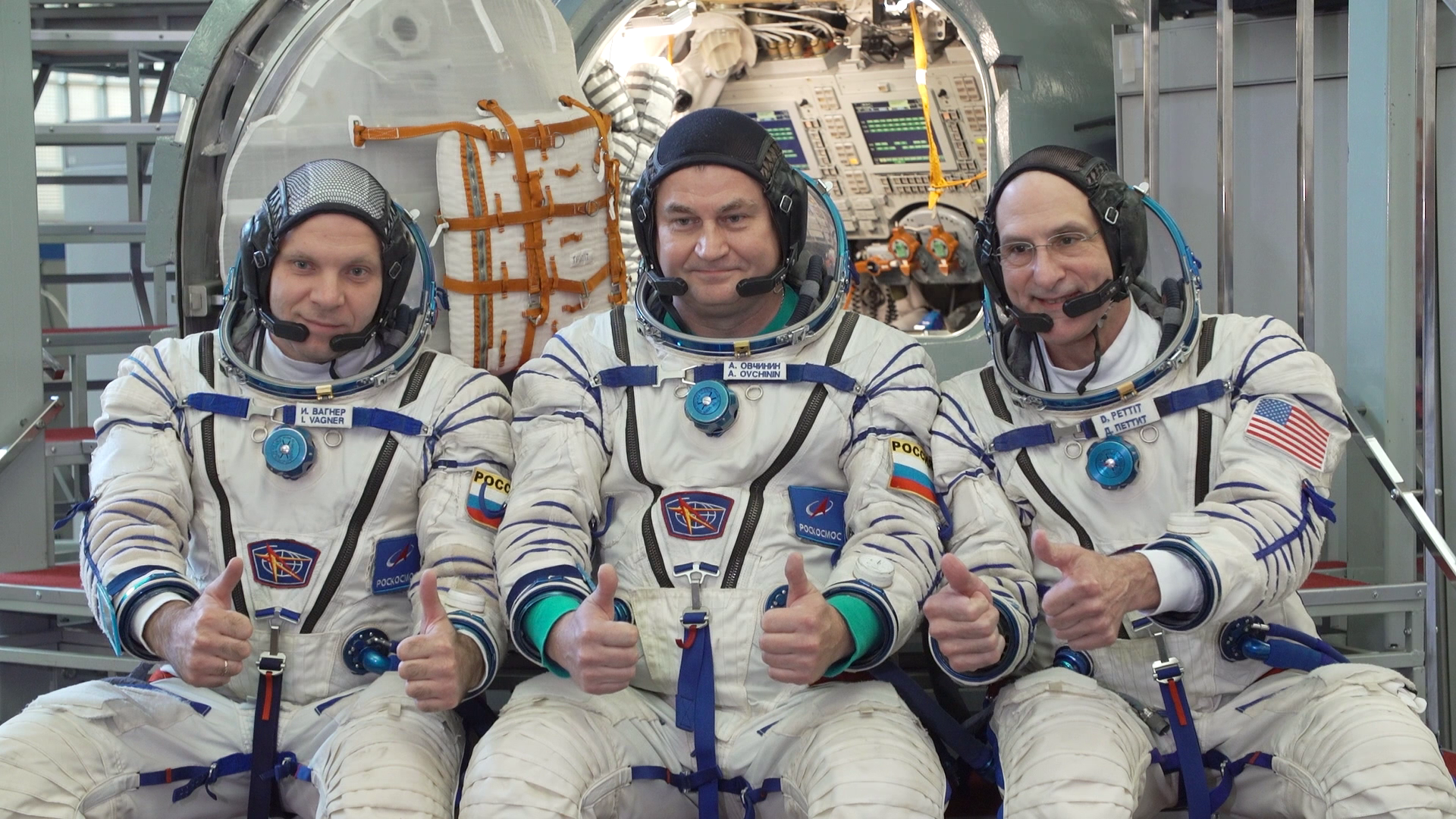
- Mission patch, which depicts the three crew members as Burlak (the mission's callsign) pulling the Soyuz From left: Vagner, Ovchinin and Pettit Soyuz programme (crewed)

Soyuz MS-26, Russian production No. 757 and identified by NASA as Soyuz 72S, was a Russian crewed Soyuz spaceflight launched from Site 31/6 at the Baikonur Cosmodrome on 11 September 2024 to the International Space Station. The mission transported three crew members, Roscosmos cosmonauts Aleksey Ovchinin and Ivan Vagner, along with NASA astronaut Donald Pettit.

When the spacecraft crossed the Karman line shortly after launch, there was a record 19 people in outer space: the three astronauts on the MS-26 mission, three more on China's Tiangong space station, four people on the SpaceX Polaris Dawn mission, and nine more on board the International Space Station.

== Crew ==
Prime crew
Position	Crew
Commander	Aleksey Ovchinin, Roscosmos; Expedition 71/72; Third (Note: Not counting the aborted flight of Soyuz MS-10.) spaceflight
Flight engineer	Ivan Vagner, Roscosmos; Expedition 71/72; Second spaceflight
Flight engineer	Donald Pettit, NASA; Expedition 71/72; Fourth spaceflight

Backup crew
Position	Crew
Commander	Sergey Ryzhikov, Roscosmos
Flight engineer	Alexey Zubritsky, Roscosmos
Flight engineer	Jonny Kim, NASA

== Gallery ==
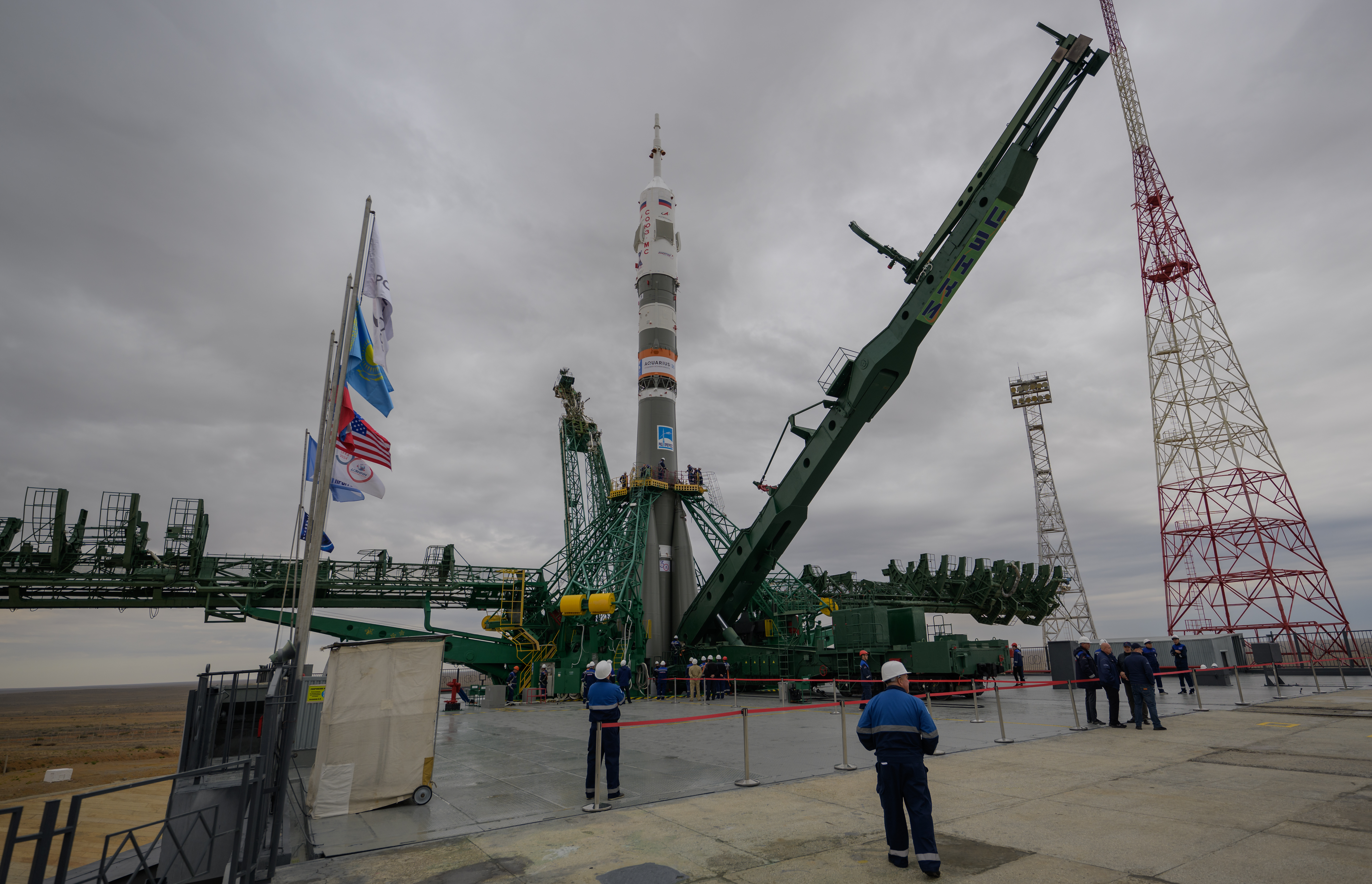
Soyuz MS-26 atop a Soyuz-2.1a rocket shortly after it was erected

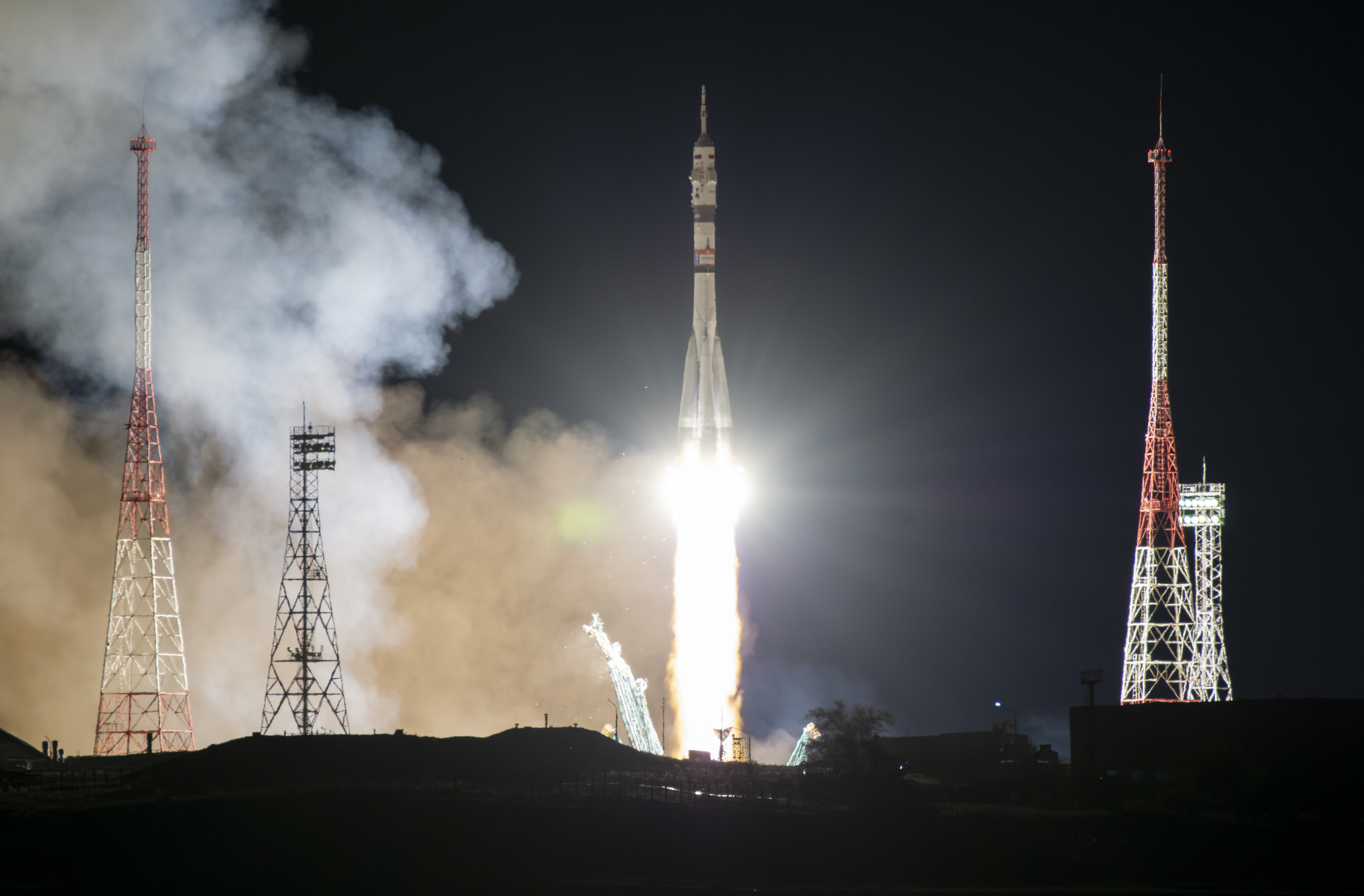
Soyuz MS-26 launches atop a Soyuz-2.1a rocket

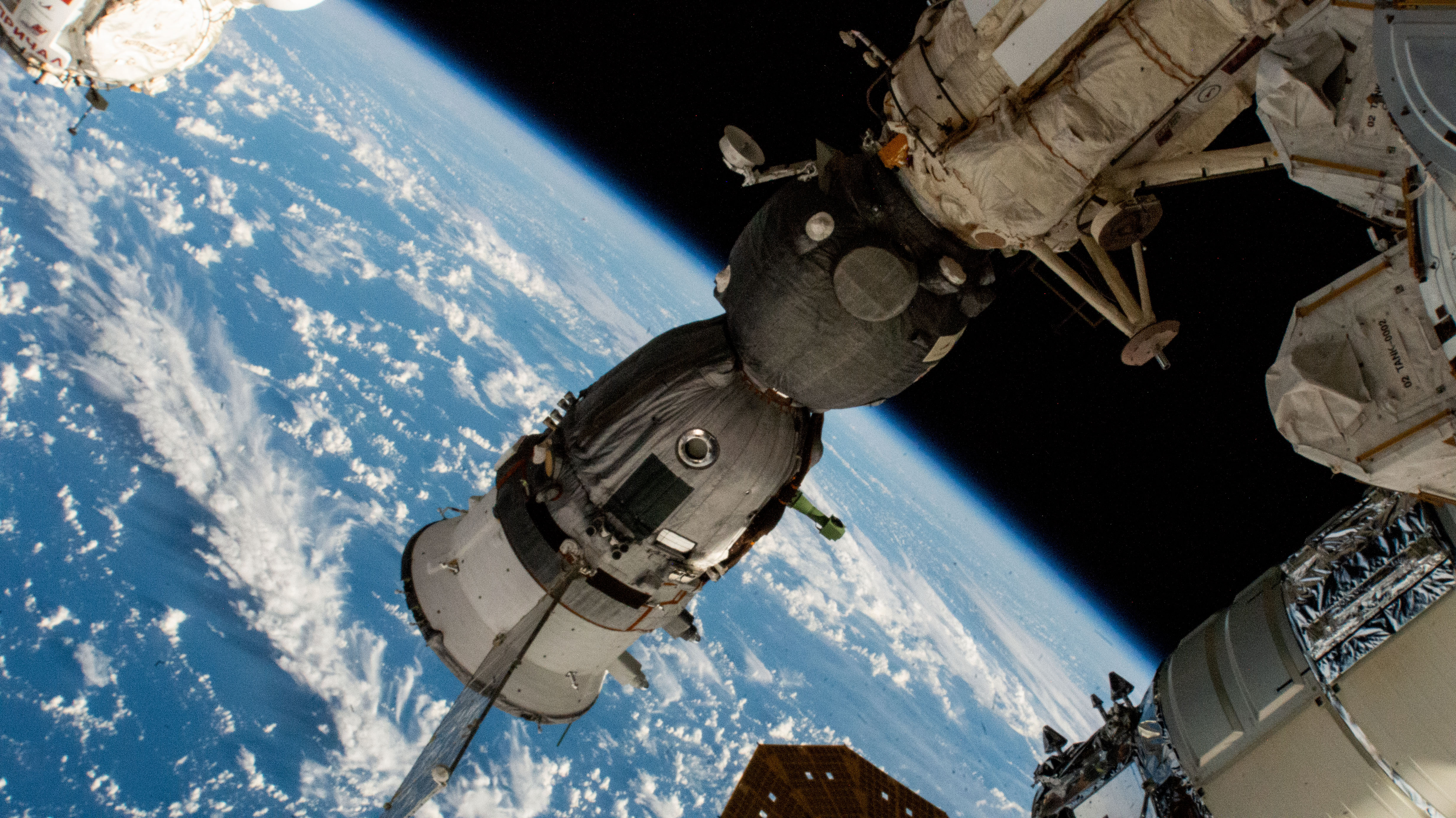
Soyuz MS-26 docked to the Rassvet module

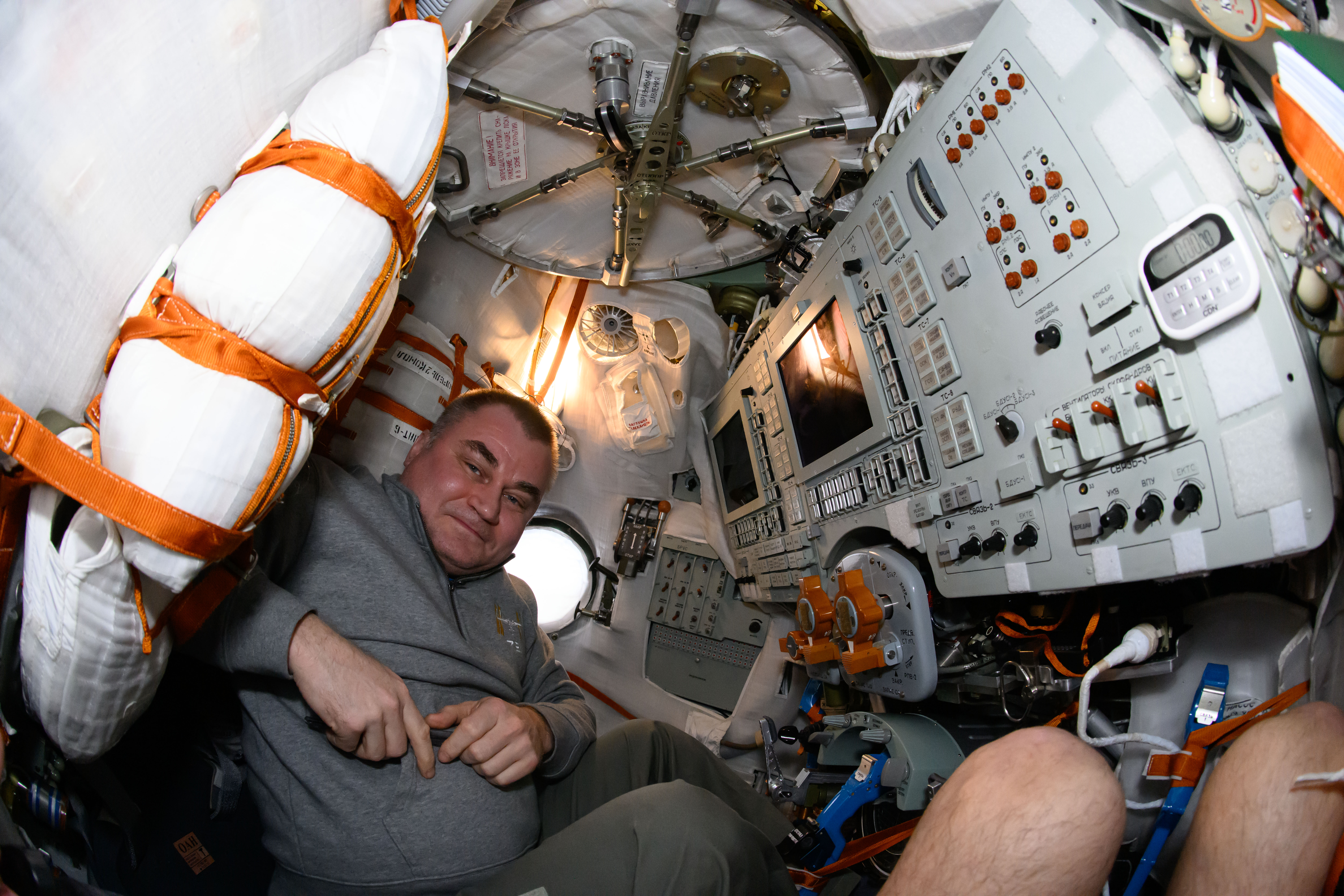
Ovchinin at the controls of Soyuz MS-26 in space during pre-departure fit checks

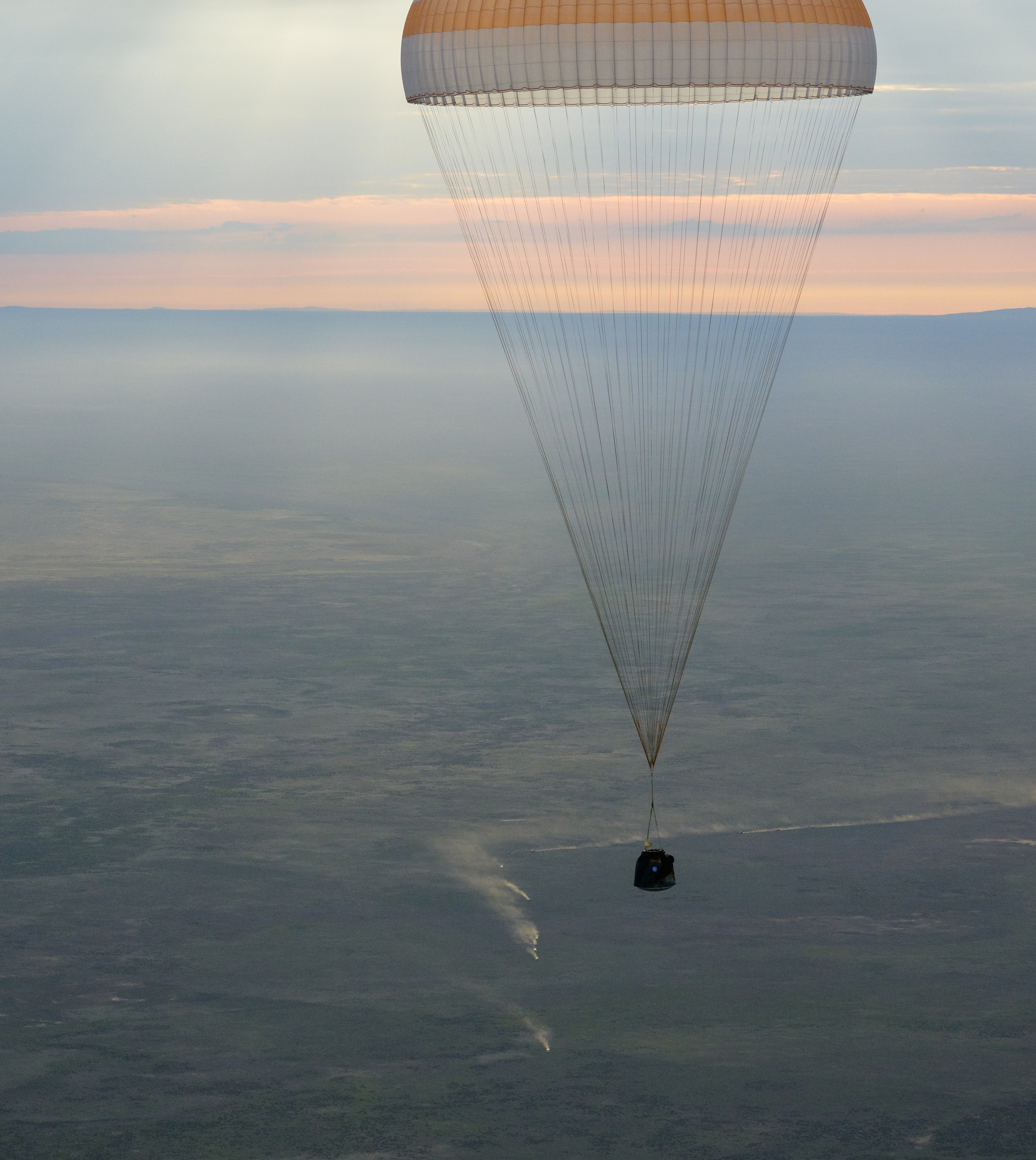
Soyuz MS-26 descends back to the Kazakh Steppe under a parachute

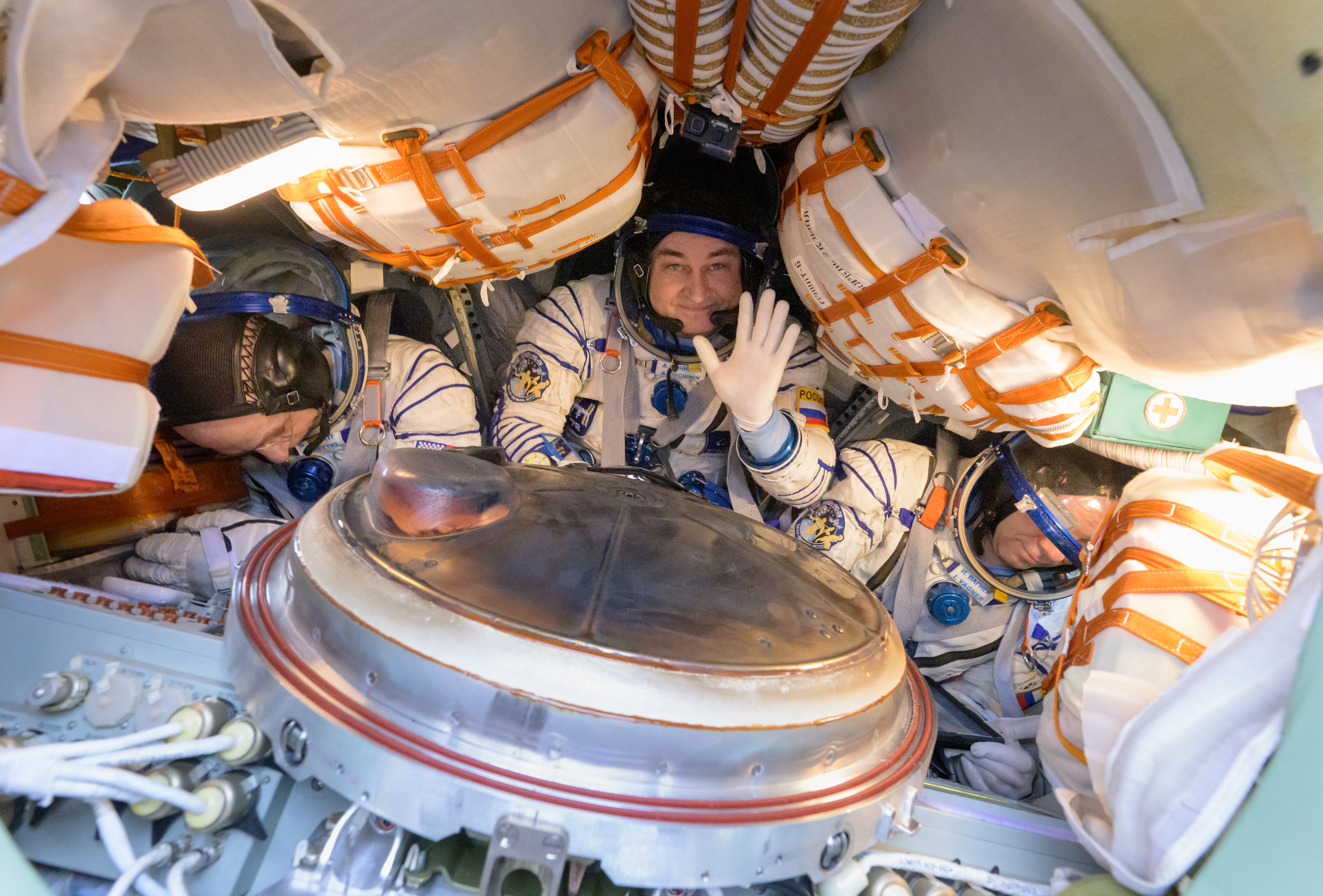
From left: Pettit, Ovchinin, Vagner inside Soyuz MS-26 after landing
