= Ken Bowersox =

American astronaut (born 1956)

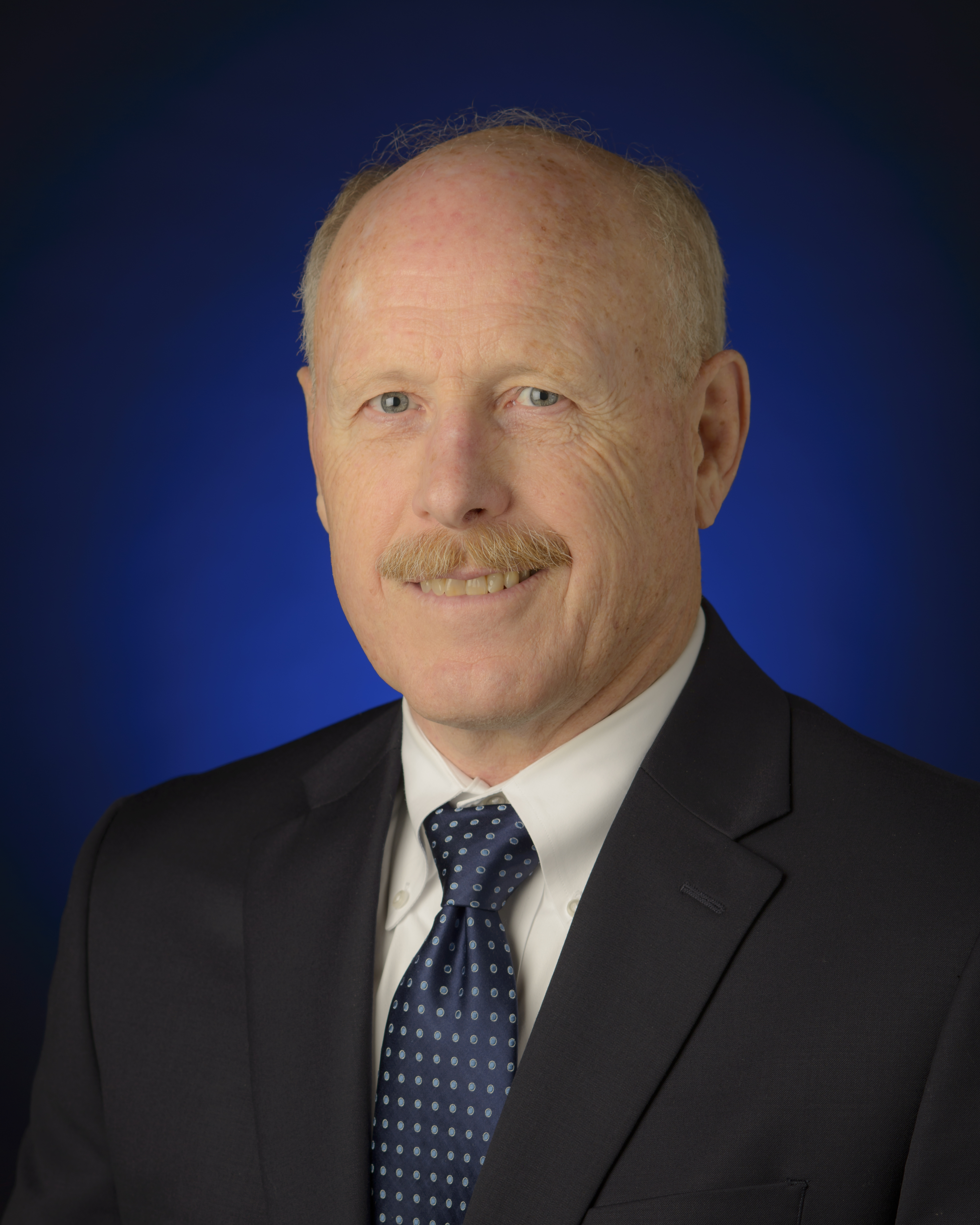
- Bowersox in 2019
- Born: Kenneth Dwane Bowersox; November 14, 1956 (age 69); Portsmouth, Virginia, U.S.
- Other name: Sox
- Education: United States Naval Academy (BS); Columbia University (MS)
- Occupation: NASA Associate Administrator for Space Operations
- Space career

NASA astronaut
- Rank: Captain, US Navy
- Time in space: 211 days, 14 hours and 12 minutes
- Selection: NASA Group 12 (1987)
- Total EVAs: 2
- Total EVA time: 13 hours and 17 minutes
- Missions: STS-50; STS-61; STS-73; STS-82; STS-113/Soyuz TMA-1 (Expedition 6)
- Retired: March 6, 2026

Kenneth Dwane "Sox" Bowersox (born November 14, 1956) is a United States Navy officer and former NASA astronaut. He is a veteran of four Space Shuttle missions and an extended stay aboard the International Space Station. When he launched on STS-73 at the age of 38 years and 11 months, he became the youngest person to command a Space Shuttle.

== Early life and education ==
Bowersox was born November 14, 1956, in Portsmouth, Virginia, but considers Bedford, Indiana his hometown. As a young boy, his family lived in Oxnard, California for seven years, and he attended Rio Real Elementary School. Bowersox was active in the Boy Scouts of America, and is an Eagle Scout. He earned a Bachelor of Science degree in aerospace engineering from the United States Naval Academy in Annapolis, Maryland, before receiving his commission in 1978. A year later, in 1979, he received a Master of Science degree in mechanical engineering from Columbia University in New York City, New York. Bowersox attended the U.S. Air Force Test Pilot School and graduated with Class 85A. He served as a test pilot on A-7E and F/A-18 aircraft, and was selected as an astronaut candidate in 1987. Bowersox holds the rank of captain in the United States Navy.

== NASA career ==
He was selected as an astronaut pilot by NASA in 1987.

=== STS-50 ===
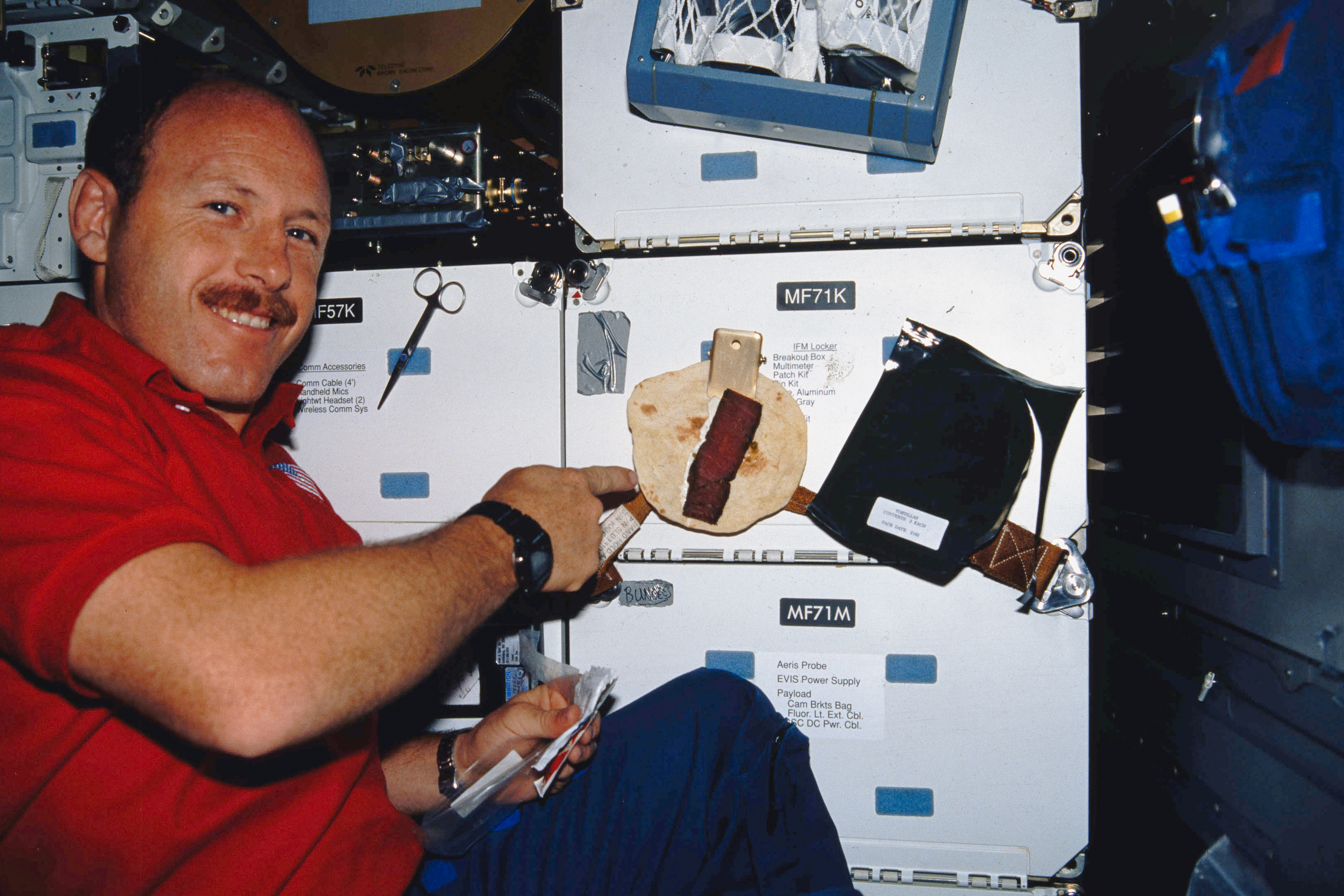
Bowersox making a sandwich during STS-50

Bowersox's first mission was STS-50 aboard the Columbia, where he served as the pilot. The mission launched on June 25, 1992, from Launch Complex 39A at the Kennedy Space Center, Florida at 16:12:23 UTC. Its primary objective was to conduct experiments in the U.S. Microgravity Laboratory 1 (USML-1), a Spacelab module dedicated to the study of microgravity. This module housed experiments related to fluid dynamics, crystal growth, combustion, and biological processes.

The mission concluded with a landing at the Shuttle Landing Facility, Florida on July 9, 1992, at 11:42:27 UTC.

=== STS-61 ===
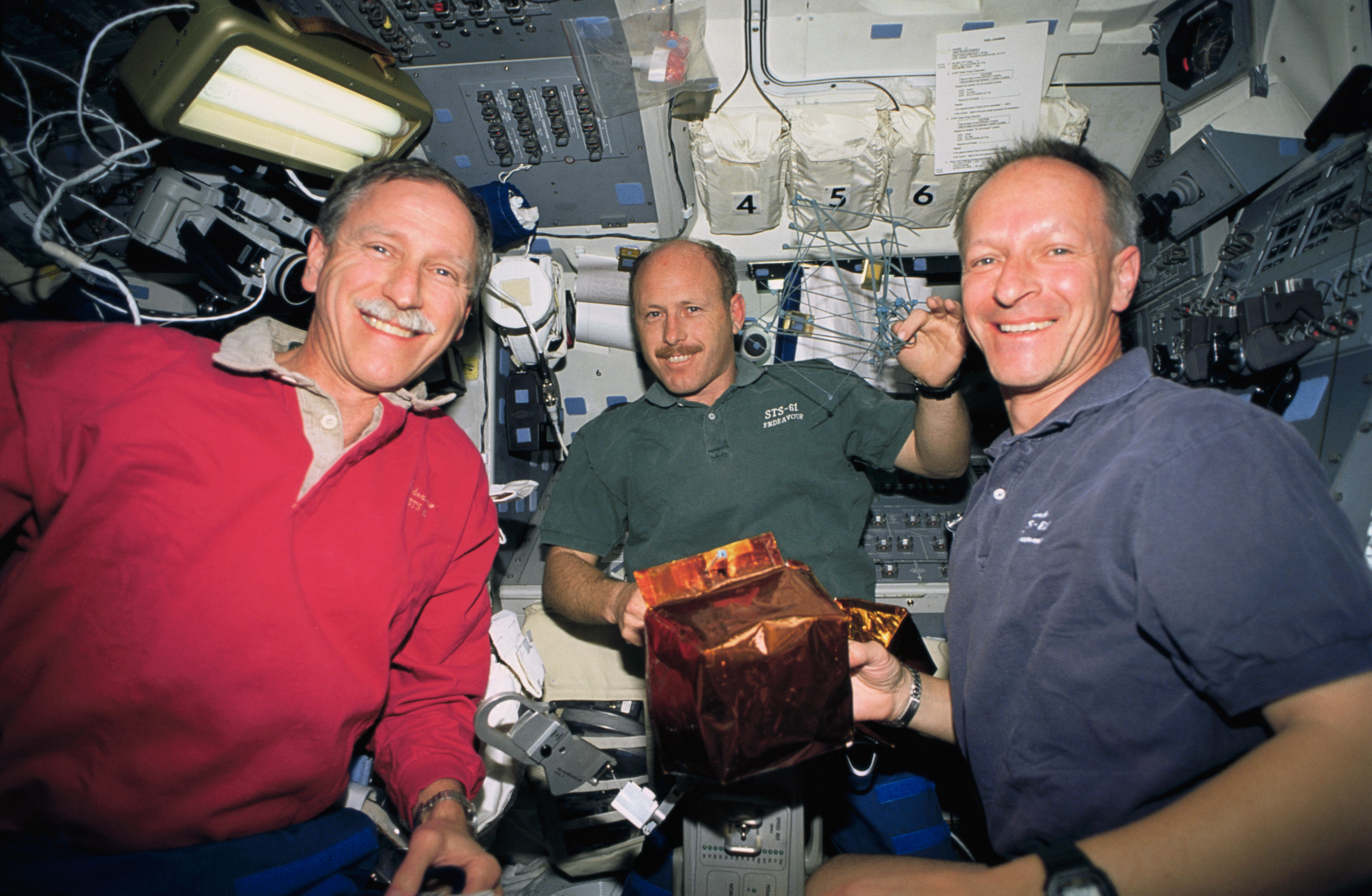
Bowersox (center) and crewmates in orbit during STS-61

Bowersox's second mission was STS-61 aboard the Endeavour, in which he served as the pilot. The mission was launched on December 2, 1993, from Launch Complex 39B at 09:27:00 UTC. The mission's primary objective was the first servicing of the Hubble Space Telescope, during which astronauts performed a series of spacewalks to repair and upgrade the telescope's systems, thereby restoring its optical performance and extending its operational lifespan. STS-61 concluded with the Endeavour landing successfully at the Shuttle Landing Facility on December 13, 1993, at 05:25:37 UTC.

=== STS-73 ===
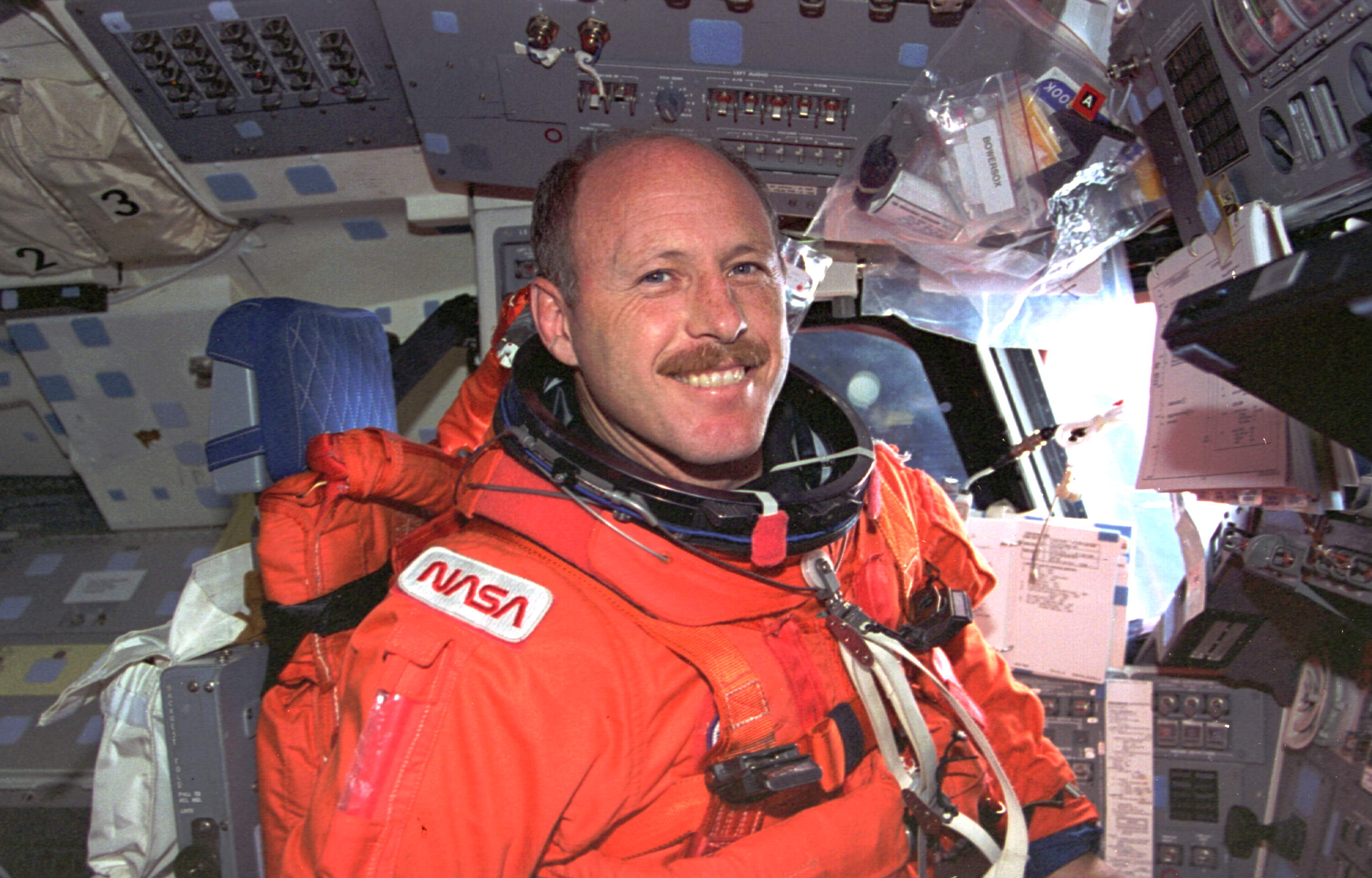
Bowersox pictured in the shuttle commander's seat during STS-73, prior to re-entry

Bowersox's third mission was STS-73 aboard the Columbia, where he served for the first time as the mission commander. The mission was launched on October 20, 1995, from Launch Complex 39B at 13:53:00 UTC. STS-73's primary objective was to conduct a series of experiments in the U.S. Microgravity Laboratory-2 (USML-2), focusing on materials science, biotechnology, combustion science, and fluid mechanics in the unique microgravity environment of space. The mission concluded with Columbia landing successfully at the Shuttle Landing Facility on November 5, 1995, at 11:45:21 UTC.

=== STS-82 ===
Bowersox's fourth mission in space was STS-82 aboard the Discovery, where he served as the mission commander. The mission launched on February 11, 1997, from Launch Complex 39A at 08:55:17 UTC. STS-82 was the second servicing mission to the Hubble Space Telescope. During the mission, astronauts performed a series of spacewalks to install new instruments and conduct repairs on the telescope.

The tasks undertaken aimed to enhance the telescope's operational capabilities. Following the completion of its objectives, STS-82 concluded with Discovery landing at the Shuttle Landing Facility on February 21, 1997, at 08:32:00 UTC.

=== ISS Expedition 6 ===
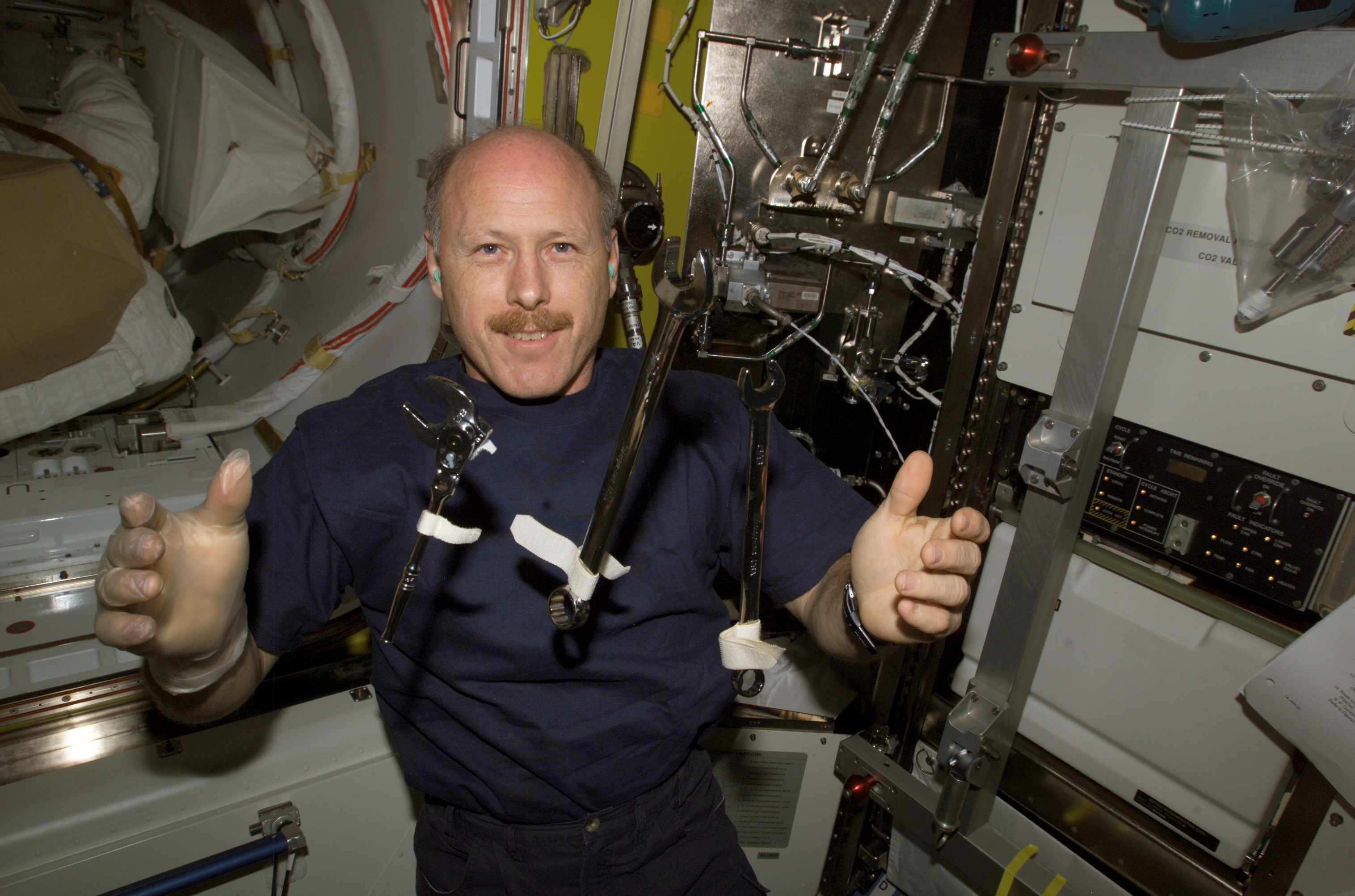
Bowersox pictured on the ISS

Bowersox served as the commander of Expedition 6 to the International Space Station (ISS). Alongside him were crewmates Nikolai Budarin and Donald Pettit. As commander, Bowersox was responsible for the overall success of the mission and the safety of his crew.

The expedition commenced with the crew's launch aboard the Space Shuttle Endeavour from Launch Complex 39A on November 23, 2002, at 00:49 UTC. They docked with the ISS on November 25, 2002, at 21:59 UTC. During their stay, the crew conducted several scientific experiments in the microgravity of space and performed two spacewalks to continue outfitting and maintenance on the ISS. Originally set to return aboard STS-114, the Expedition 6 crew's descent was shifted to the Russian Soyuz TMA-1 spacecraft due to the Columbia tragedy. They landed near Arkalyk, Kazakhstan, on May 4, 2003, at 02:04 UTC.

== After NASA ==
Bowersox retired from NASA on September 30, 2006. On June 16, 2009, he was appointed vice president of Astronaut Safety and Mission Assurance at SpaceX. He was inducted into the Astronaut Hall of Fame on June 8, 2010, four days after the first successful launch of SpaceX's Falcon 9 rocket.

It was reported on January 17, 2012, that Bowersox resigned from SpaceX in late December 2011.

Bowersox appeared on three episodes of the American TV show Home Improvement. Series 3, Episode 24, titled "Reality Bytes", aired 18 May 1994.

== NASA leadership ==
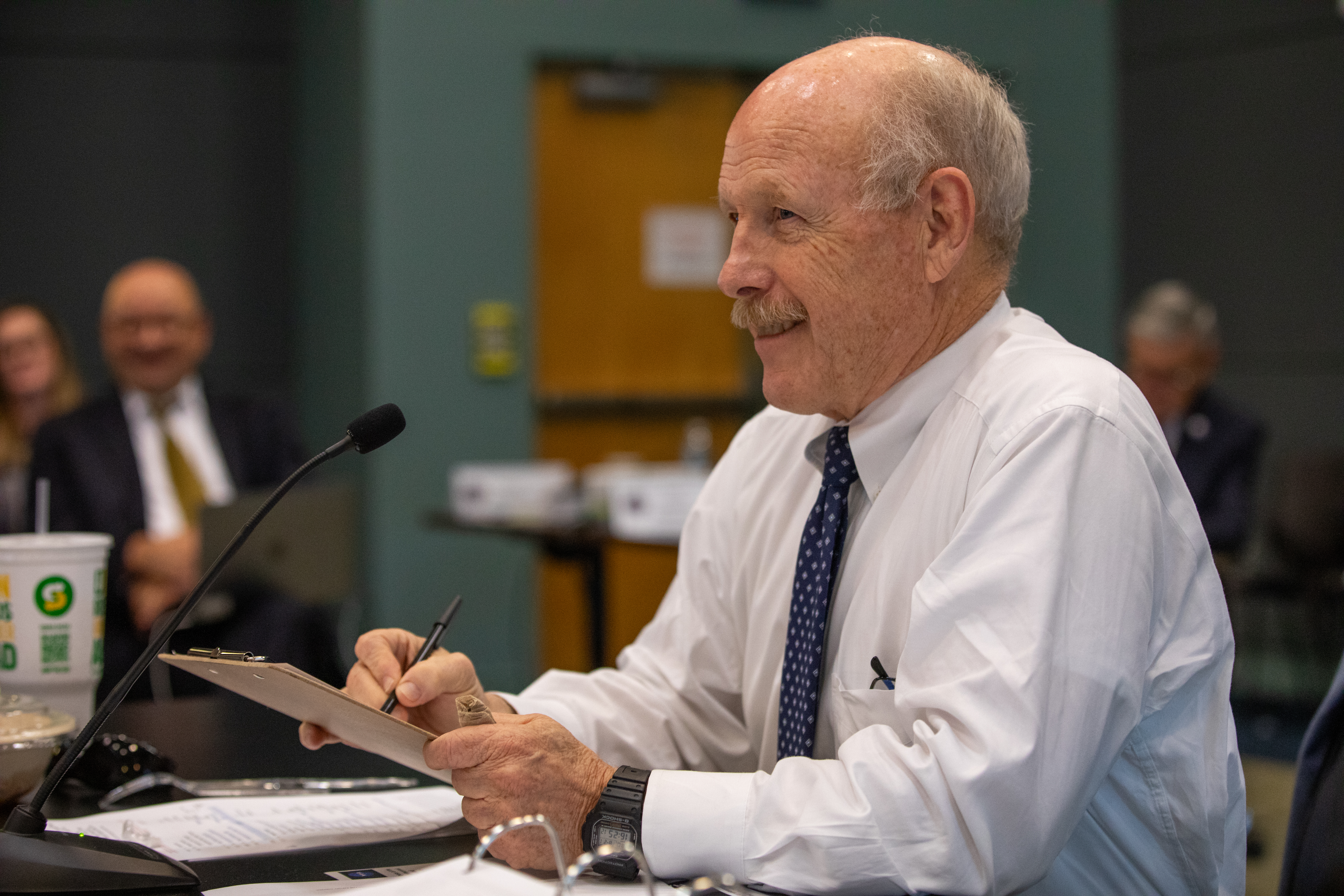
Bowersox, as Associate Administrator for Space Operations, during a Flight Readiness Review panel in 2023.

In July 2019, Bowersox returned to NASA as the Acting Associate Administrator for the Human Exploration Operations Mission Directorate, replacing William Gerstenmaier. In May 2020, Bowersox again became NASA's Acting Associate Administrator for the Human Exploration Operations Mission Directorate, replacing Douglas Loverro.

In May 2023, Bowersox was named the associate administrator of the Space Operations Mission Directorate.

Bowersox retired from NASA leadership on March 6, 2026.

== Awards and decorations ==
Bowersox is a recipient of the National Defense Service Medal with award star, Global War on Terrorism Service Medal, Navy Sea Service Deployment Ribbon and NASA Space Flight Medal with four award stars.

On October 26, 1995, Bowersox threw out the ceremonial first pitch at Game 5 of the 1995 World Series.
