= Expedition 6 =

Long-duration mission to the International Space Station

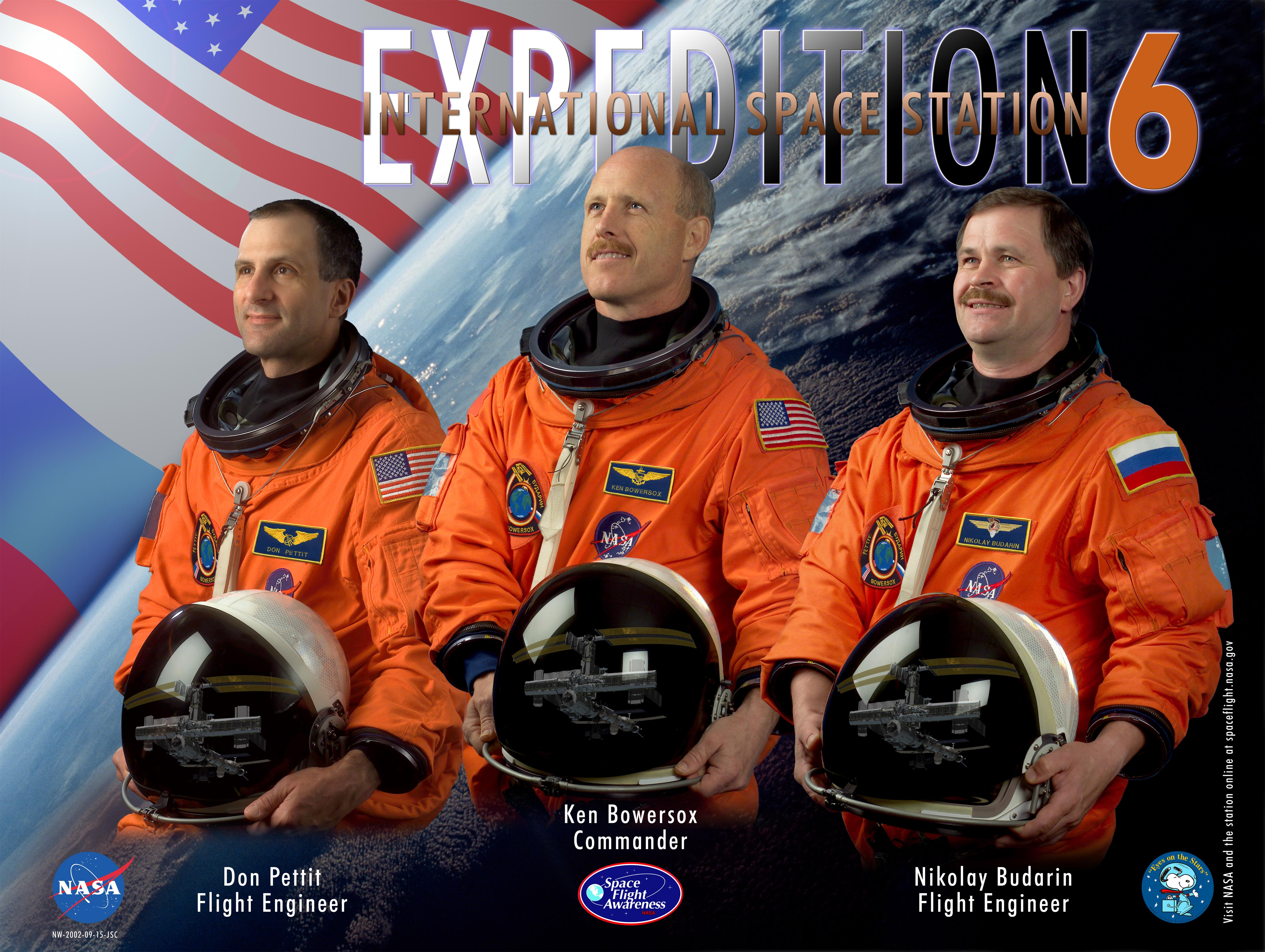
- Promotional poster
- Mission type: Long-duration expedition
- Mission duration: 159 days, 44 minutes (at ISS); 161 days, 1 hour, 14 minutes, 38 seconds (launch to landing)
- Distance travelled: ~107,824,795 kilometres (66,999,221 mi)
- Orbits completed: 2,536

Expedition
- Space station: International Space Station
- Began: 25 November 2002, 21:59 UTC
- Ended: 3 May 2003, 22:43 UTC
- Arrived aboard: STS-113; Space Shuttle Endeavour
- Departed aboard: Soyuz TMA-1

Crew
- Crew size: 3
- Members: Kenneth Bowersox; Nikolai Budarin; Donald Pettit
- EVAs: 2
- EVA duration: 13 hours, 17 minutes
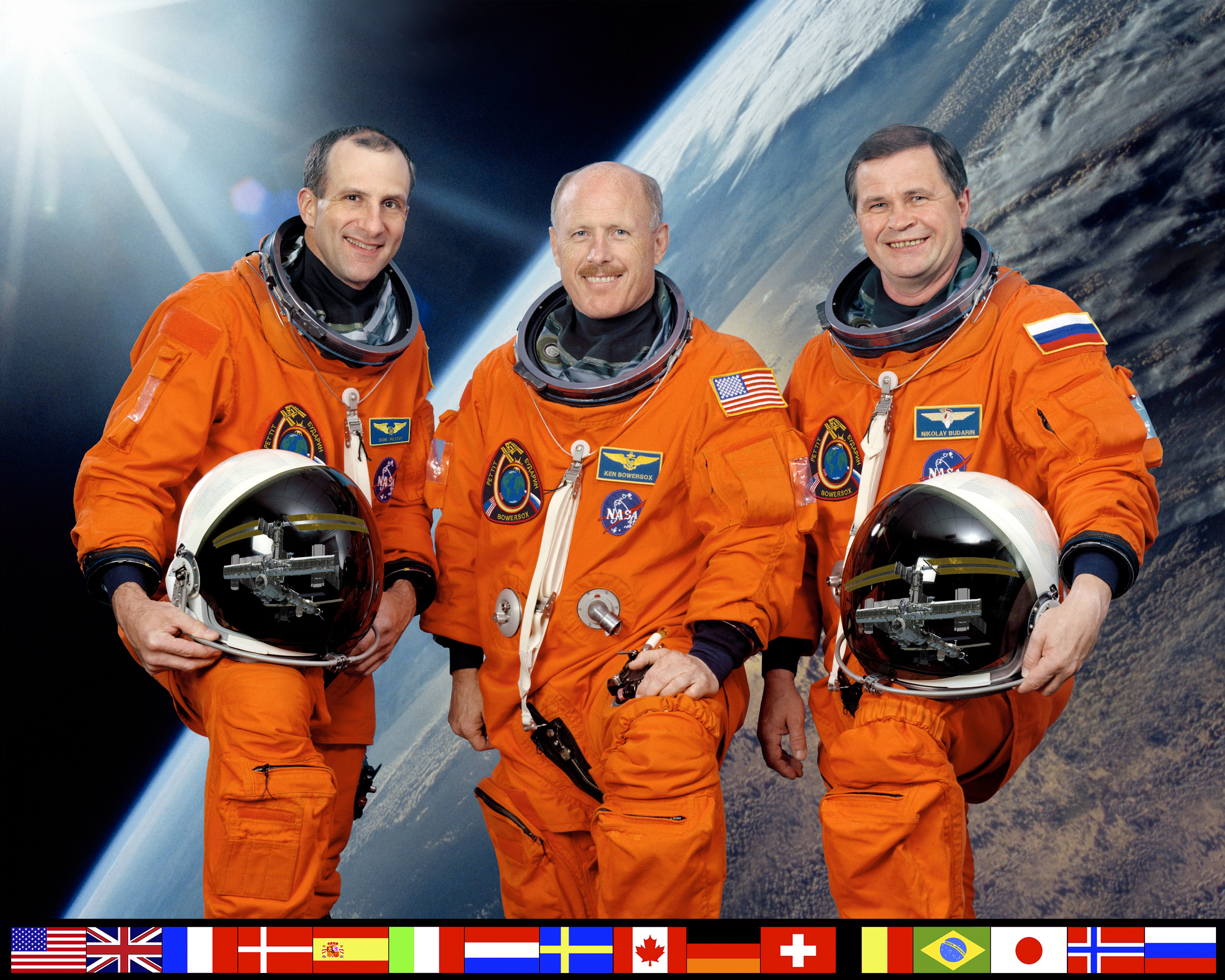
- Expedition 6 mission patch L-R: Donald Pettit, Ken Bowersox and Nikolai Budarin ISS expeditions

Expedition 6 was the sixth expedition to the International Space Station (25 November 2002 – 3 May 2003). It was the last three-man crew to reside on the station until the arrival of STS-121 in 2006, delivering the final astronaut of Expedition 13. The crew performed two spacewalks in support of maintenance and assembly of the International Space Station.

== Crew ==
Prime crew
| Position | Crew |
|---|---|
| Commander | Kenneth Bowersox, NASA; Fifth and last spaceflight |
| Flight Engineer | Nikolai Budarin, RSA; Third and last spaceflight |
| Flight Engineer | Donald Pettit, NASA; First spaceflight |
NASA astronaut Donald Thomas was scheduled to fly as a flight engineer but was pulled due to medical concerns and replaced by his backup, Pettit.

Backup crew
| Position | Crew |
|---|---|
| Commander | Salizhan Sharipov, RSA |
| Flight Engineer | Michael Fincke, NASA |

== Mission parameters ==
- Perigee: 384 km
- Apogee: 396 km
- Inclination: 51.6°
- Period: 92 min

== Mission objectives ==
NASA astronaut Donald A. Thomas was scheduled to fly with the Expedition 6 crew as a flight engineer but was pulled due to medical concerns and replaced by his backup, Don Pettit.

The station's sixth crew was launched to the Station aboard Space Shuttle Endeavour STS-113 in November 2002. The mission was planned to be a four-month mission that was to end in March 2003 when Atlantis STS-114 was to fly to the station with the Expedition 7 crew. The Columbia disaster, which occurred during the mission on 1 February 2003 and resulted in the indefinite suspension of shuttle flights, led to a change of plan such that the crew stayed on the station until May 2003. They returned to Earth on Soyuz TMA-1, and a reduced Expedition 7 crew with just two members was delivered to the ISS on Soyuz TMA-2. The Space Shuttle was expected to be grounded for up to two years. Ongoing logistical support for the ISS would have to be carried out by Soyuz and Progress flights until the Space Shuttle returned to flight.

The sixth crew of the International Space Station returned to Earth just after 10 p.m. EDT on 3 May 2003, the first time U.S. astronauts landed in a Russian Soyuz spacecraft, though a U.S. space tourist, Dennis Tito, had done so in 2001.

Russian Mission Control reported at approximately 2:45 a.m. on 4 May that the support helicopters had reached the crew, and all three crew members were in good health. The capsule touched down approximately 276 miles (444 km) from its planned landing zone.

== Spacewalks ==
The Expedition 6 crew conducted two spacewalks during its stay at the International Space Station. Both were based out of the Quest Airlock, and the spacewalkers used U.S. spacesuits, which are called Extravehicular Mobility Units. The crew was originally scheduled to conduct only one spacewalk, but a second was added to the manifest for 8 April in order to prepare for future assembly missions.

Pettit was not initially scheduled to participate in the spacewalk but stepped in for Budarin, who was removed from the task days before due to a medical issue.

The two Expedition 6 extravehicular activities bring the total number of spacewalks conducted in support of ISS assembly and maintenance to 51. Of those 51 EVA's, Twenty-six have been based out of the station, with 17 staged from Quest. Bowersox and Pettit accumulated 13 hours and 17 minutes of spacewalking time at the station.

| Mission | Spacewalkers | Start (UTC) | End (UTC) | Duration |
|---|---|---|---|---|
| Expedition 6 EVA 1 | Ken Bowersox; Don Pettit | 15 January 2003; 12:50 | 15 January 2003; 19:41 | 6 hours, 51 minutes |
| Expedition 6 EVA 1 | Bowersox and Pettit continued outfitting and activating the International Space Station's newest component, the P1 (P-One) Truss. The P1's radiator assembly was a major focus during the spacewalk. Bowersox and Pettit released the remaining launch locks on the radiator assembly, which allowed the radiator assembly to be deployed. Other scheduled tasks completed included removing some debris that was on a sealing ring on the Unity Module's Earth-facing docking port, and they tested an ammonia reservoir on the station's P6 Truss. They were unable to complete one scheduled task—the installation of a light fixture on one of the station's Crew and Equipment Translation Aid, or CETA, carts. The fixture's attachment was rescheduled for a future spacewalk. To complete the spacewalk, Bowersox and Pettit cut away a thermal cover strap that apparently interfered with the rotation of the Quest Airlock's hatch and delayed the start of the extravehicular activity. | | | |
| Expedition 6 EVA 2 | Bowersox; Pettit | 8 April 2003; 12:40 | 8 April 2003; 19:06 | 6 hours, 26 minutes |
| Expedition 6 EVA 2 | Bowersox and Pettit reconfigured cables on the S0 (S-Zero), S1 and P1 Trusses for future Integrated Truss Structure component deliveries and replaced a Power Control Module on the Mobile Transporter. They provided Control Moment Gyro No. 2 with a redundant power channel capability by rerouting cables. Then, they installed Spool Positioning Devices on Destiny Laboratory heat exchangers and reinstalled a thermal cover on an S1 Radiator Beam Valve Module. Bowersox and Pettit also unfurled a light stanchion on the CETA cart that did not unfurl properly during their first spacewalk. | | | |

== Cultural references ==
Expedition 6 is the subject of the book Too Far From Home: A Story of Life and Death in Space, by Chris Jones.

A dramatised account of Expedition 6 is told in Expedition 6, a play by actor/playwright Bill Pullman. The play was scheduled to run at San Francisco's Magic Theater through 7 October 2007.
