= List of visitors to the International Space Station =

This is a list of all of the visitors to the International Space Station (ISS), including long-term crew, short-term visitors, and space tourists, in alphabetical order. ISS crew names are in bold. The suffix (twice, three times, ...) refers to the individual's number of spaceflights to the ISS, not the total number of spaceflights. Entries without a flag symbol indicate that the individual was an American citizen at launch. Entries without a female symbol are men.

== Statistics ==
As of April 8, 2024, 250 individuals have made 411 spaceflights to the ISS, including the seven people currently at the ISS (Expedition 74). Two people have made five spaceflights to the ISS, while five people have made four, 36 people made three and 84 people made two. Note that this list assigns individuals with dual citizenship to their country of primary residence at time of launch (for example, the Iranian-American space tourist Anousheh Ansari is only listed under the United States).

Initially all private space travel was aboard the Russian Soyuz spacecraft. When only two crew members are required in the three-seat Soyuz, and additional cargo is not sent, the additional seat is sold to the general public through Space Adventures. Private travelers would remain on the ISS during handover from one expedition crew to the next, generally a week or two. The NASA Space Shuttle carried seven crew members, and the longest docking with the ISS was 11 days. Many visitors to the ISS were accommodated for short periods during NASA shuttle dockings.

NASA stated it was "not interested" in private spaceflight during construction of the ISS, but eventually began allowing up to two flights per year in 2019, with the first private visitors arriving at the US Orbital Segment in 2022 on a SpaceX Crew Dragon.

=== Long-term ISS crew, by nationality ===
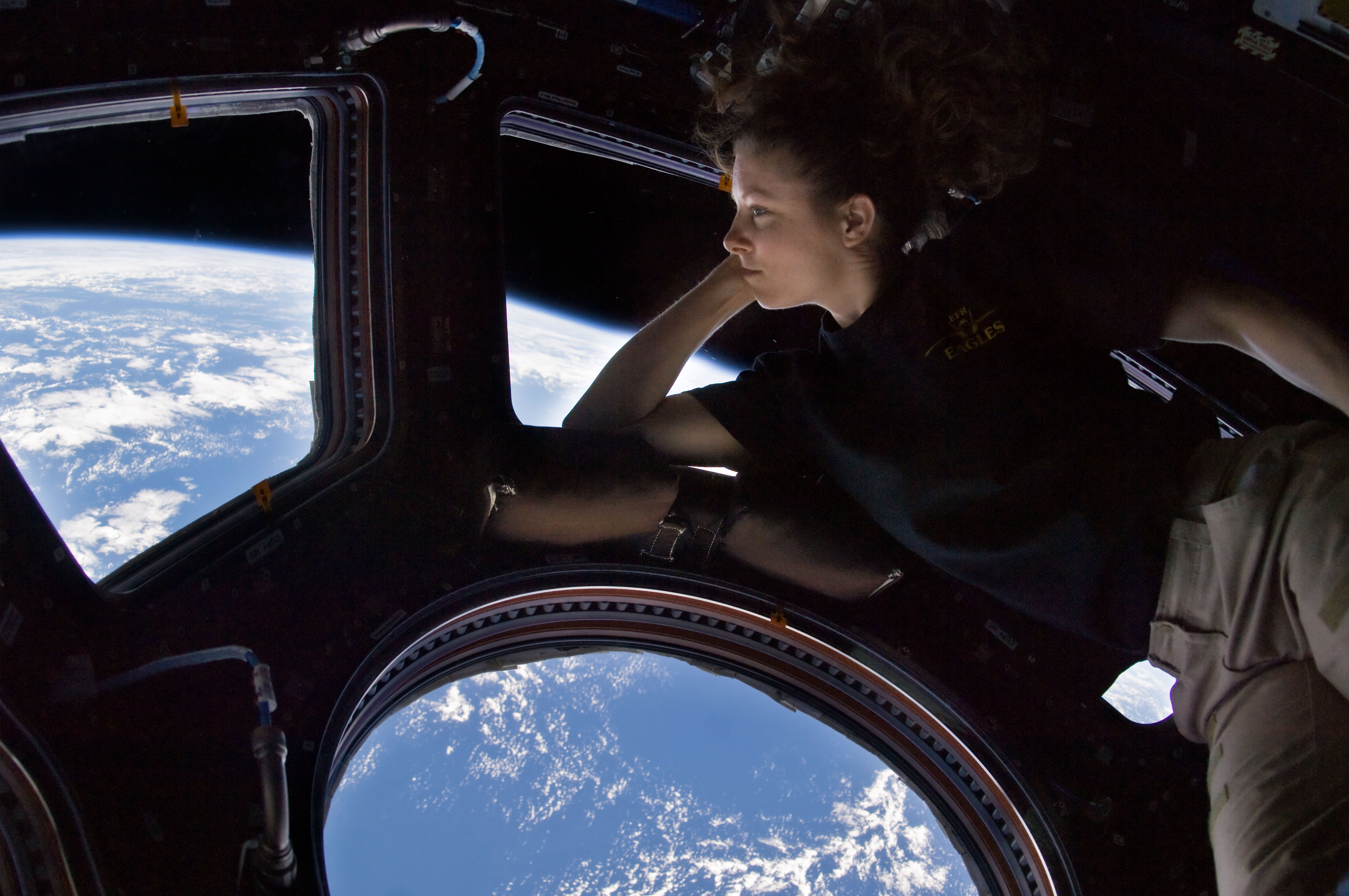
Tracy Caldwell Dyson in the Cupola module of the International Space Station observing Earth

| Nationality | ISS crew/members |
|---|---|
| United States | 57 |
| Russia | 46 |
| Japan | 6 |
| Germany | 3 |
| Italy | 3 |
| France | 2 |
| Canada | 3 |
| Belgium | 1 |
| Netherlands | 1 |
| United Kingdom | 1 |
| Spain | 1 |
| United Arab Emirates | 1 |
| **Total** | 120 |

=== All visitors, by nationality ===
| Nationality | Flights | Individuals | Notes |
|---|---|---|---|
| United States | 274 | 158 | 31 women, seven tourists, 56 double, 25 triple, six quadruple and one quintuple flyers |
| Russia | 96 | 54 | 2 women, 14 double, eight triple, one quadruple and three quintuple flyers |
| Japan | 14 | 9 | one woman, four double and one triple flyer |
| Canada | 9 | 8 | one woman, one tourist, two double flyers |
| Italy | 9 | 5 | one woman, one double flyer, two triple flyers |
| France | 4 | 4 | one woman |
| Germany | 3 | 3 | |
| Hungary | 3 | 2 | one double flyer |
| United Arab Emirates | 2 | 2 | |
| Saudi Arabia | 2 | 2 | |
| Belgium | 2 | 1 | one double flyer |
| Denmark | 2 | 1 | one double flyer |
| Netherlands | 2 | 1 | one double flyer |
| Sweden | 3 | 2 | one double flyer |
| Brazil | 1 | 1 | |
| India | 1 | 1 | |
| Israel | 1 | 1 | |
| Kazakhstan | 1 | 1 | |
| Malaysia | 1 | 1 | |
| Poland | 1 | 1 | |
| South Africa | 1 | 1 | one tourist |
| South Korea | 1 | 1 | one woman |
| Spain | 1 | 1 | |
| Turkey | 1 | 1 | |
| United Kingdom | 1 | 1 | |
| Belarus | 1 | 1 | one woman |
| **Total** | 415 | 252 | 38 women, 9 tourists, 81 double, 33 triple, eight quadruple and three quintuple flyers |

=== All visitors, by agency ===
| Agency | Flights | Individuals | ISS crew | Notes |
|---|---|---|---|---|
| NASA | 256 | 145 | 56 | 27 women, 56 double, 25 triple and four quadruple flyers |
| Roscosmos | 90 | 51 | 45 | one woman, 14 double, eight triple and three quintuple flyers |
| ESA | 25 | 18 | 16 | two women, four double flyers and two triple flyers |
| JAXA | 12 | 8 | 6 | one woman, two double and one triple flyer |
| CSA | 8 | 6 | 2 | one woman, two double flyers |
| MBRSC | 2 | 2 | 1 | |
| AEB | 1 | 1 | - | |
| CNES | 1 | 1 | - | Philippe Perrin later joined ESA |
| HSO | 1 | 1 | - | |
| ISRO | 1 | 1 | - | |
| ANGKASA | 1 | 1 | - | |
| KARI | 1 | 1 | - | one woman |
| KazCosmos | 1 | 1 | - | |
| TUA | 1 | 1 | - | |
| Belarus Space Agency | 1 | 1 | - | one woman |
| Tourists | 8 | 7 | - | one woman, one double flyer |
| **Total** | 411 | 250 | 118 | 37 women, 80 double, 35 triple, five quadruple and two quintuple flyers |

== A ==
- **Joe Acaba** (three times)
- Viktor Afanasyev (Russia)
- Aydyn Aimbetov (Kazakhstan)
- Ali AlQarni (Saudi Arabia)
- Scott D. Altman
- **Clayton C. Anderson** (twice)
- Anousheh Ansari (Iran) / (United States) (tourist)
- Dominic A. Antonelli (twice)
- Lee J. Archambault (twice)
- Richard R. Arnold
- **Oleg Artemyev** (Russia) (three times)
- Jeffrey S. Ashby (twice)
- **Nichole Ayers**

== B ==
- Rayyanah Barnawi (Saudi Arabia)
- **Michael R. Barratt** (three times)
- **Kayla Barron**
- Daniel T. Barry (twice)
- Yuri Baturin (Russia)
- Robert L. Behnken (three times)
- Michael J. Bloomfield (twice)
- Eric A. Boe (twice)
- **Andrei Borisenko** (Russia) (twice)
- **Konstantin Borisov** (Russia)
- **Stephen G. Bowen** (four times)
- **Kenneth D. Bowersox**
- **Randolph J. Bresnik** (twice)
- **Nikolai Budarin** (Russia)
- **Daniel C. Burbank** (three times)
- **Daniel W. Bursch**

== C ==
- Robert D. Cabana
- Charles J. Camarda
- **Zena Cardman**
- **Josh A. Cassada**
- **Christopher J. Cassidy** (twice)
- **Gregory E. Chamitoff** (twice)
- Franklin R. Chang-Diaz (Costa Rica) / (United States)
- **Raja Chari**
- **Leroy Chiao** (twice)
- **Catherine G. Coleman**
- **Nikolai Chub** (Russia)
- Eileen M. Collins
- Larry Connor (tourist)
- Kenneth D. Cockrell (twice)
- **Timothy J. Creamer**
- **Samantha Cristoforetti** (Italy) (twice)
- **Frank L. Culbertson**
- Robert L. Curbeam (twice)
- Nancy J. Currie

== D ==
- **Frank De Winne** (Belgium) (twice)
- **Vladimir Dezhurov** (Russia)
- Takao Doi (Japan)
- **Matthew Dominick**
- Benjamin A. Drew (twice)
- **Pyotr Dubrov** (Russia)
- Brian Duffy
- Pedro Duque (Spain)
- James P. Dutton
- **Tracy E. Caldwell-Dyson** (three times)

== E ==
- **Léopold Eyharts** (France)
- **Jeanette J. Epps**

== F ==
- **Andrey Fedyaev** (Russia)
- Christopher J. Ferguson (three times)
- Andrew J. Feustel (Canada) / (United States)
- **Michael Fincke** (four times)
- **Jack D. Fischer**
- **Michael Foale** (United Kingdom) / (United States)
- **Kevin A. Ford** (twice)
- Michael J. Foreman (twice)
- Patrick G. Forrester (three times)
- **Michael E. Fossum** (three times)
- Stephen N. Frick (twice)
- Christer Fuglesang (Sweden) (twice)
- **Satoshi Furukawa** (Japan) (twice)

== G ==
- **Ronald J. Garan** (twice)
- Marc Garneau (Canada)
- Richard A. Garriott (tourist)
- Michael L. Gernhardt
- **Alexander Gerst** (Germany) (twice)
- Alper Gezeravcı (Turkey)
- **Yuri Gidzenko** (Russia) (twice)
- **Victor Glover**
- Linda M. Godwin
- Michael T. Good
- **Alexander Grebenkin** (Russia)
- **Aleksandr Gorbunov** (Russia)
- Umberto Guidoni (Italy)

== H ==
- **Chris Hadfield** (Canada) (twice)
- **Nick Hague** (twice)
- Claudie Haigneré (France)
- James D. Halsell
- Kenneth Ham (twice)
- **Susan Helms** (twice)
- José M. Hernández
- John Herrington
- Joan Higginbotham
- **Robert Hines**
- Yozo Hirano (Japan) (tourist)
- Kathryn P. Hire
- Charles O. Hobaugh (three times)
- **Warren Hoburg**
- **Michael S. Hopkins** (twice)
- Scott J. Horowitz (twice)
- **Akihiko Hoshide** (Japan) (twice)
- Douglas G. Hurley (three times)
- Rick Husband

== I ==
- Marsha S. Ivins
- **Anatoli Ivanishin** (Russia) (three times)

== J ==
- Tamara E. Jernigan
- Brent W. Jett (twice)
- Gregory H. Johnson (twice)
- Thomas D. Jones

== K ==
- **Aleksandr Kaleri** (Russia) (twice)
- Tibor Kapu (Hungary)
- Janet L. Kavandi
- James M. Kelly (twice)
- Mark E. Kelly (four times)
- **Scott J. Kelly** (three times)
- **Nicole Aunapu Mann**
- **Jonny Kim**
- **Robert S. Kimbrough** (twice)
- **Christina Koch**
- **Dmitri Kondratyev** (Russia)
- **Oleg Kononenko** (Russia) (five times)
- **Timothy L. Kopra** (twice)
- **Mikhail Korniyenko** (Russia) (twice)
- **Sergey Korsakov** (Russia)
- **Valery Korzun** (Russia)
- **Oleg Kotov** (Russia) (three times)
- Konstantin Kozeyev (Russia)
- **Sergei Krikalev** (Russia) (three times)
- **Sergey Kud-Sverchkov** (Russia)
- **André Kuipers** (Netherlands) (twice)

== L ==
- Guy Laliberté (Canada) (tourist)
- Wendy B. Lawrence
- **Kjell Lindgren** (twice)
- Steven W. Lindsey (three times)
- Richard M. Linnehan
- Paul S. Lockhart (twice)
- **Yuri Lonchakov** (Russia) (three times)
- **Michael E. Lopez-Alegria** (five times)
- Stanley G. Love
- **Edward T. Lu** (twice)

== M ==
- Steve MacLean (Canada)
- Yusaku Maezawa (Japan) (tourist)
- **Sandra H. Magnus** (three times)
- **Yuri Malenchenko** (Russia) (five times)
- **Hazza Al Mansouri** (United Arab Emirates)
- **Nicole Aunapu Mann**
- **Thomas H. Marshburn** (three times)
- **Richard A. Mastracchio** (four times)
- **Denis Matveev** (Russia)
- **Matthias Maurer** (Germany)
- **Megan McArthur**
- **William S. McArthur** (twice)
- **Anne McClain** (twice)
- Pamela A. Melroy (three times)
- Leland D. Melvin (twice)
- Dorothy M. Metcalf-Lindenburger
- **Aleksandr Misurkin** (Russia) (three times)
- **Andreas Mogensen** (Denmark) (twice)
- **Jasmin Moghbeli**
- Lee M. E. Morin
- Barbara R. Morgan
- Boris Morukov (Russia)
- Talgat Musabayev (Russia) flew in 2001 as a Russian citizen, became citizen of Kazakhstan in 2007

== N ==
- **Paolo Nespoli** (Italy) (three times)
- James H. Newman
- **Sultan Al Neyadi** (United Arab Emirates)
- **Soichi Noguchi** (Japan) (three times)
- Carlos I. Noriega
- **Oleg Novitskiy** (Russia) (three times)
- Lisa M. Nowak
- **Karen L. Nyberg** (twice)

== O ==
- Ellen L. Ochoa (twice)
- William A. Oefelein
- **Loral O'Hara**
- John D. Olivas (twice)
- **Takuya Onishi** (Japan) (twice)
- **Yuri Onufrienko** (Russia)
- Gregory H. Olsen (tourist)
- **Aleksey Ovchinin** (Russia) (three times)

== P ==
- **Gennady Padalka** (Russia) (four times)
- Scott E. Parazynski (twice)
- **Luca Parmitano** (Italy) (twice)
- Mark Pathy (Canada) (tourist)
- Nicholas J.M. Patrick (twice)
- Julie Payette (Canada) (twice)
- **Timothy Peake** (United Kingdom)
- Yulia Peresild (Russia) (tourist)
- Philippe Perrin (France)
- **Dmitry Petelin** (Russia)
- **Thomas Pesquet** (France) (twice)
- **Kirill Peskov** (Russia)
- **Donald R. Pettit** (four times)
- **John L. Phillips** (three times)
- **Oleg Platonov** (Russia)
- Alan G. Poindexter (twice)
- Mark L. Polansky (three times)
- Marcos Pontes (Brazil)
- Dominic L. Pudwill Gorie (twice)
- **Sergey Prokopyev** (Russia) (twice)

== R ==
- James F. Reilly (twice)
- **Garrett E. Reisman** (twice)
- **Thomas Reiter** (Germany)
- **Sergei Revin** (Russia)
- Paul W. Richards
- Stephen K. Robinson (twice)
- **Roman Romanenko** (Russia) (twice)
- Kent V. Rominger (twice)
- Jerry L. Ross (twice)
- **Kathleen Rubins** (twice)
- **Francisco Rubio**
- **Sergey Ryazansky** (Russia) (twice)
- **Sergey Ryzhikov** (Russia) (three times)

== S ==
- **David Saint-Jacques** (Canada)
- **Aleksandr Samokutyayev** (Russia) (twice)
- Robert L. Satcher
- **Yelena Serova** (Russia)
- Hans Schlegel (Germany)
- Piers J. Sellers (three times)
- Yuri Shargin (Russia)
- **Salizhan Sharipov** (Russia)
- **William M. Shepherd**
- Klim Shipenko (Russia) (tourist)
- **Anton Shkaplerov** (Russia) (four times)
- John Shoffner
- Shubhanshu Shukla (India)
- Mark Shuttleworth (South Africa) (tourist)
- Sheikh Muszaphar Shukor (Malaysia)
- Charles Simonyi (Hungary) / (United States) (tourist) (twice)
- **Oleg Skripochka** (Russia) (three times)
- **Aleksandr Skvortsov** (Russia) (three times)
- Steven L. Smith
- Heidemarie M. Stefanyshyn-Piper (twice)
- Eytan Stibbe (Israel)
- **Nicole P. Stott** (twice)
- Frederick W. Sturckow (four times)
- **Maksim Surayev** (Russia) (twice)
- **Steven R. Swanson** (three times)

== T ==
- **Daniel M. Tani** (twice)
- Joseph R. Tanner (twice)
- **Evgeny Tarelkin** (Russia)
- Andrew S.W. Thomas (Australia) / (United States) (twice)
- **Robert Thirsk** (Canada)
- **Scott Tingle**
- Dennis Tito (tourist)
- **Valery Tokarev** (Russia) (twice)
- **Sergei Treshchev** (Russia)
- **Mikhail Tyurin** (Russia) (three times)

== U ==
- **Yury Usachev** (Russia) (twice)

== V ==
- **Ivan Vagner** (Russia) (twice)
- **Mark T. Vande Hei** (twice)
- Marina Vasilevskaya (Belarus)
- **Pavel Vinogradov** (Russia) (twice)
- **Terry W. Virts** (twice)
- Roberto Vittori (Italy) (three times)
- **Sergey Volkov** (Russia) (three times)
- **James S. Voss** (twice)

== W ==
- **Koichi Wakata** (Japan) (five times)
- Rex J. Walheim (three times)
- **Shannon Walker** (twice)
- Walter Villadei (Italy)
- **Carl E. Walz**
- Marcus Wandt (Sweden) / (Norway)
- **Jessica Watkins**
- Mary E. Weber
- James D. Wetherbee (twice)
- **Douglas H. Wheelock** (twice)
- **Peggy A. Whitson** (four times)
- Terrence W. Wilcutt
- Dafydd Williams (Canada)
- **Jeffrey N. Williams** (four times)
- **Sunita L. Williams** (three times)
- **Barry E. Wilmore** (three times)
- Stephanie D. Wilson (three times)
- **Reid Wiseman**
- Sławosz Uznański-Wiśniewski (Poland)
- Peter J. K. Wisoff
- David A. Wolf (twice)

== Y ==
- Naoko Yamazaki (Japan)
- Yi So-Yeon (South Korea)
- **Kimiya Yui** (Japan) (twice)
- **Fyodor Yurchikhin** (Russia) (five times)

== Z ==
- Sergei Zalyotin (Russia)
- George D. Zamka (Colombia) / (United States) (twice)
- **Alexey Zubritsky** (Russia)

== See also ==
- List of International Space Station crew
- List of astronauts by name
