= Tracy Caldwell Dyson =

American chemist and NASA astronaut (born 1969)

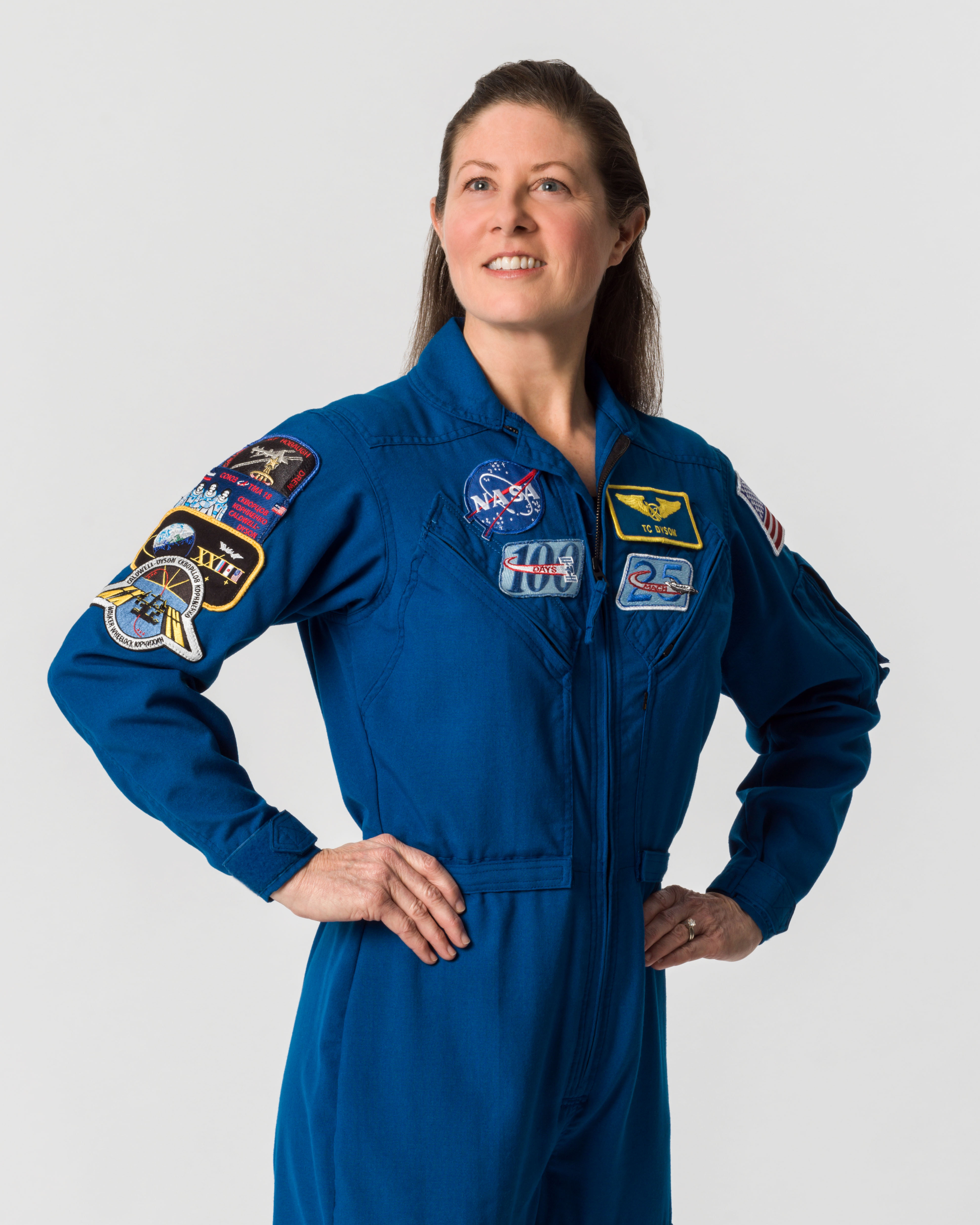
- Caldwell Dyson in 2023
- Born: Tracy Ellen Caldwell; August 14, 1969 (age 57); Arcadia, California, U.S
- Education: California State University, Fullerton (BS); University of California, Davis (MS, PhD)
- Spouse: George Dyson
- Space career

NASA astronaut
- Time in space: 372 days 18 hours and 36 minutes
- Selection: NASA Group 17 (1998)
- Total EVAs: 4
- Total EVA time: 23 hours and 20 minutes
- Missions: STS-118; Soyuz TMA-18 (Expedition 23/24); Soyuz MS-25 (Expedition 70/71)
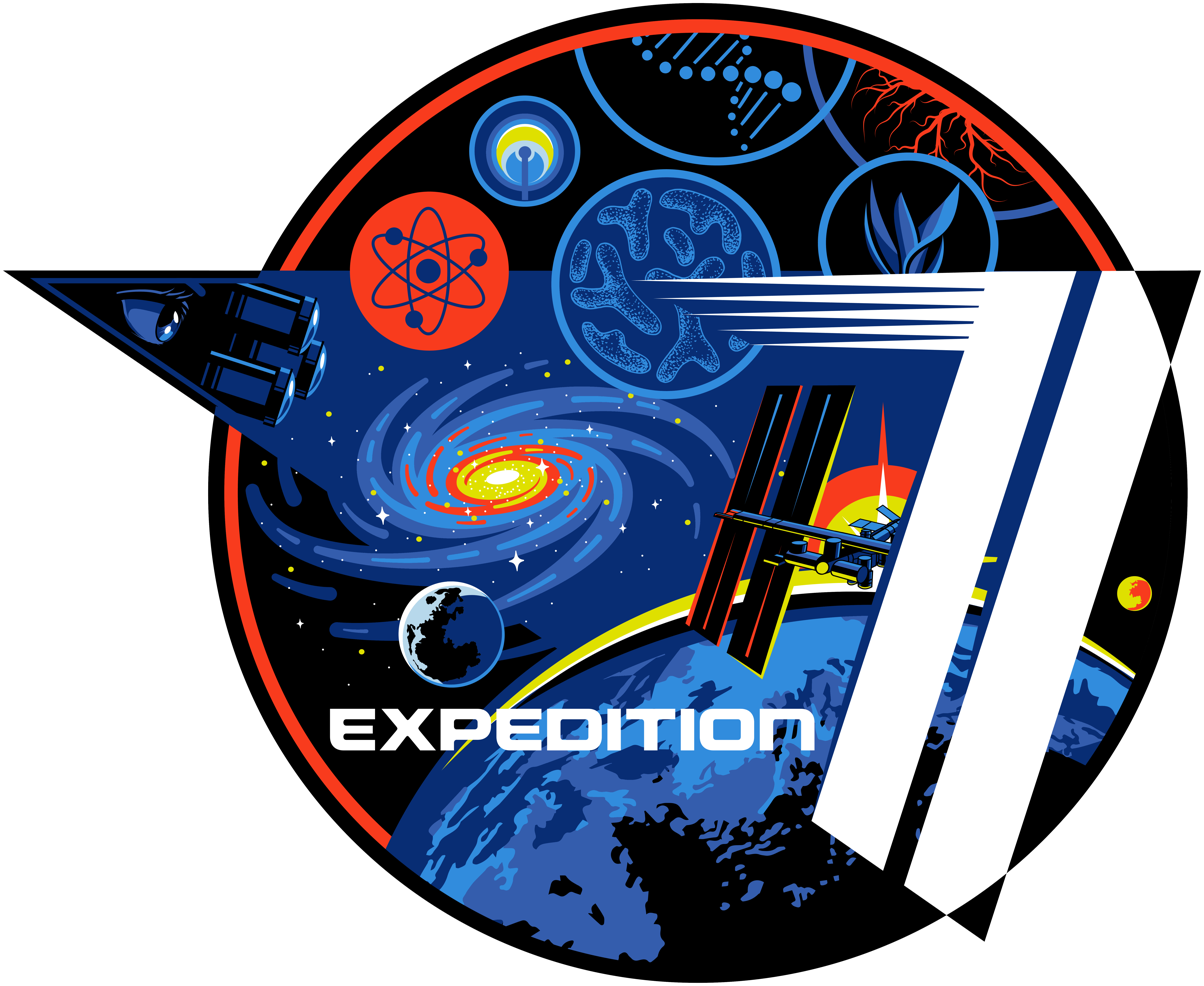
- Mission insignia
- Scientific career
- Fields: Physical chemistry
- Thesis: A Mechanistic and Kinetic Study of Heterocycle and Cyclization Chemistry on Pd(111) Using Laser-Induced Thermal Desorption with Fourier Transform Mass Spectrometry (1997)

Tracy Caldwell Dyson (born Tracy Ellen Caldwell; August 14, 1969) is an American chemist and NASA astronaut. She was a mission specialist on Space Shuttle Endeavour flight STS-118 in August 2007 and has participated in two long-duration missions to the International Space Station, Expedition 23 and 24 from April to September 2010 and Expedition 70 and 71 from March to September 2024. She has completed four spacewalks, logging nearly 24 hours of extravehicular activity.

== Early life and education ==
Caldwell Dyson was born in Arcadia, California. She is the younger of two girls. In the early 1980s, she and her family moved to Beaumont, California, where her father worked as an electrician and where she attended junior high school and high school. Her recreational interests include running, weight training, hiking, softball, basketball, and auto repair and maintenance.

She attended California State University, Fullerton, where she competed on the CSUF Titans' track and field team as a sprinter and long jumper.

As an undergraduate researcher at California State University, Fullerton, she designed, constructed and implemented electronics and hardware associated with a laser-ionization, time-of-flight mass spectrometer for studying atmospherically relevant gas-phase chemistry. She also worked as a lab assistant in the university's research and instructional safety office, where she performed environmental monitoring of laboratories using hazardous chemicals and radioactive materials and calibrated survey instruments and helped process chemical and radioactive waste. During college and after it, she also worked as an electrician and inside wireman for her father's electrical contracting company, where she performed commercial and light industrial construction.

At the University of California, Davis, Caldwell Dyson taught general chemistry laboratory and began her graduate research. Her dissertation work focused on investigating molecular-level surface reactivity and kinetics of metal surfaces using electron spectroscopy, laser desorption, and Fourier transform mass spectrometry techniques. She also designed and built peripheral components for a variable temperature, ultra-high vacuum scanning tunneling microscopy system.

In 1997, Caldwell Dyson received the Camille and Henry Dreyfus Postdoctoral Fellowship in Environmental Science to study atmospheric chemistry at the University of California, Irvine. There, she investigated reactivity and kinetics of atmospherically relevant systems using atmospheric pressure ionization mass spectrometry, Fourier transform infrared and ultraviolet absorption spectroscopies. In addition, she developed methods of chemical ionization for spectral interpretation of trace compounds. Caldwell Dyson has published and presented her work in numerous papers at technical conferences and in scientific journals.

== Career ==
=== NASA ===
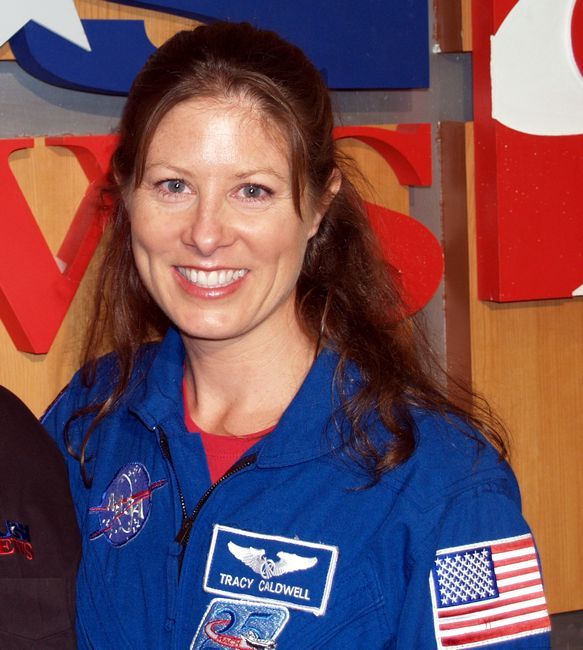
Caldwell Dyson during a 2009 celebration of the 40th anniversary of the first Moon landing

In June 1998, Caldwell Dyson was selected by NASA, and began NASA training two months later, in August 1998. Her astronaut candidate training included orientation briefings and tours, numerous scientific and technical briefings, intensive instruction in Shuttle and International Space Station (ISS) systems, physiological training, ground school to prepare for T-38 flight training, as well as learning water and wilderness survival techniques. Completion of this training and evaluation qualified her for flight assignment as a mission specialist.

In 1999, Caldwell Dyson was assigned to the Astronaut Office ISS Operations Branch as a Russian Crusader, participating in the testing and integration of Russian hardware and software products developed for ISS. In 2000, she was assigned prime crew support astronaut for the ISS Expedition 5 crew, serving as their representative on technical and operational issues throughout the training and on-orbit phase of their mission. During ISS Expeditions 4 through 6, Caldwell Dyson served as an ISS spacecraft communicator (CAPCOM) inside Mission Control. In 2003, she made a transition to the Astronaut Shuttle Operations Branch and was assigned to flight software verification in the Shuttle Avionics Integration Laboratory and worked supporting launch and landing operations at Kennedy Space Center, Florida. Caldwell Dyson also served as Lead CAPCOM for Expedition 11.

Between her second and third flights, Caldwell Dyson continued to work inside Houston’s Mission Control Center as CAPCOM for both space shuttle and space station operations, serving as the lead CAPCOM for various ISS missions, including the lead and development of the CAPCOM cadre for Boeing Starliner Mission Operations team. She was also the ground IV for US EVA 32, performed by Scott Kelly and Kjell Lindgren.

Caldwell Dyson initiated and led several projects to improve training and operations aboard the ISS, most notably developing the EVA Qualification training flow (EVQ) for astronaut candidates.

After her third trip to space, she served as the ground IV for US EVA 95, performed by Jessica Meir and Christopher Williams in March 2026. She also worked as one of the CAPCOM for the Artemis II mission, working during 3 separate shifts. During the summer 2026 with the European Space Agency, she participated in the CAVES training program with her NASA astronaut colleague, Ben Bailey and astronauts from other agencies John McFall, Ayu Yoneda and Rosemary Coogan.

As Tracy Dyson, she is the host of a series on NASA TV called StationLife, which focuses on facets of life aboard the International Space Station.

On March 21, 2017, Caldwell Dyson stood behind President Trump as he signed a bill for NASA to send humans to Mars in the 2030s and receive $19.5 billion in 2018 funding. Caldwell Dyson and fellow NASA astronaut Chris Cassidy presented Trump with an official flight jacket during the ceremony.

==== STS-118 ====
Caldwell Dyson was assigned to STS-118 on May 17, 2006. It was announced that she would serve as mission specialist 1 on the first flight of Space Shuttle Endeavour after the Columbia disaster.

On August 8, 2007, Caldwell Dyson lifted off for the first time on the 119th Space Shuttle flight, the 22nd flight to the station, and the 20th flight for Endeavour. During the mission, she successfully added another truss segment, a new gyroscope and external spare parts platform to the International Space Station. A new system that enables docked shuttles to draw electrical power from the station to extend visits to the outpost was activated successfully. A total of four spacewalks (EVAs) were performed by three crew members. Endeavour carried some 5,000 pounds of equipment and supplies to the station and returned to Earth with some 4,000 pounds of hardware and no-longer-needed equipment. Traveling 5.3 million miles in space, the STS-118 mission was completed in 12 days, 17 hours, 55 minutes and 34 seconds. On day 7 of the flight of STS-118, Caldwell-Dyson celebrated her 38th birthday.

==== Expedition 23/24 ====
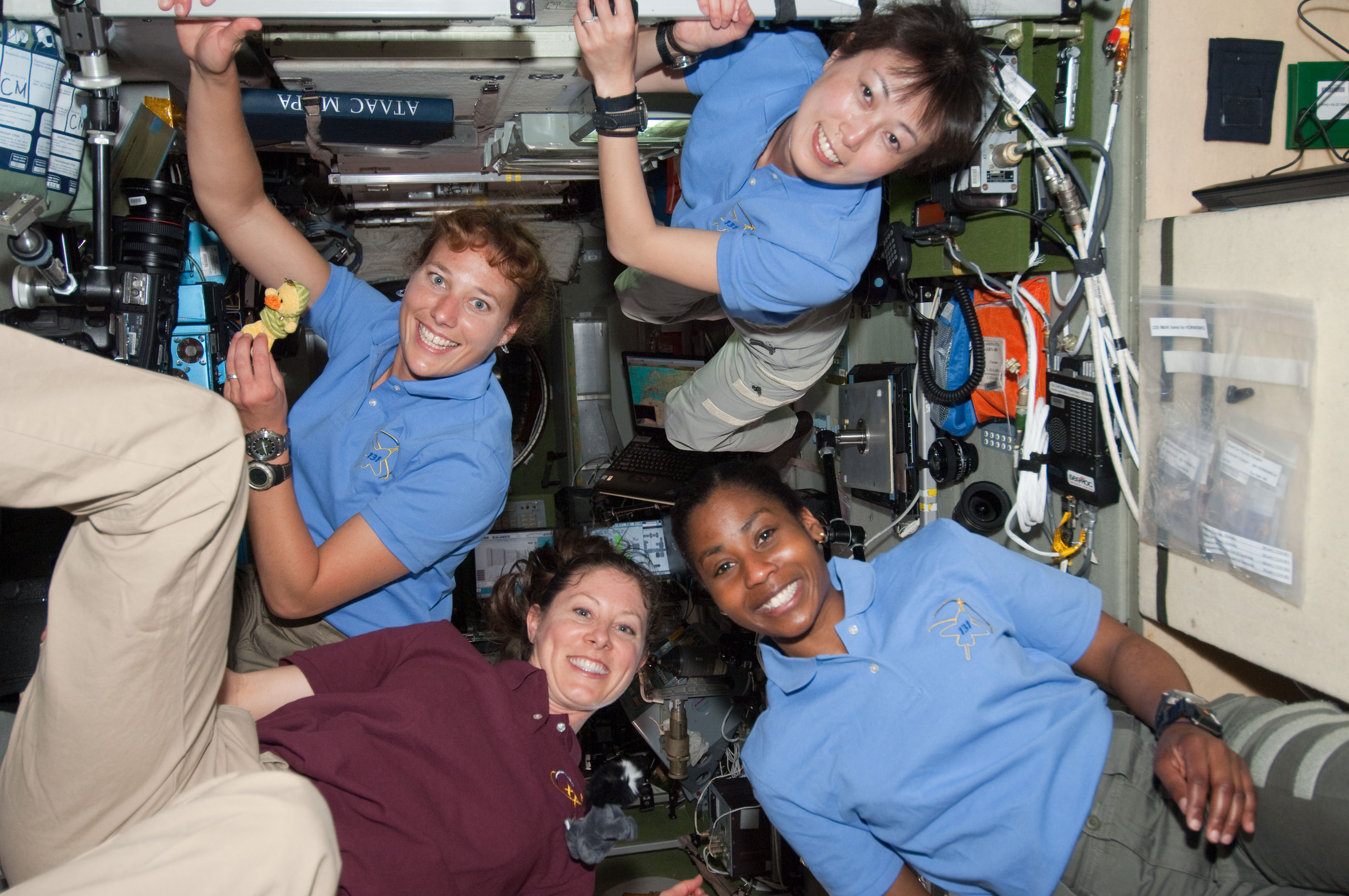
The three astronauts of STS-131 and Tracy Caldwell (bottom left) on ISS Expedition 23, the first time four women were in space at the same time

Caldwell Dyson was assigned for her second space flight on November 21, 2008. Her second space mission consisted of a six-month trip to the International Space Station.

Caldwell Dyson successfully lifted off on April 2, 2010, from the Baikonur spaceport on board the Soyuz TMA-18 as Flight Engineer 2 with Soyuz Commander Aleksandr Skvortsov and Flight Engineer 1 Mikhail Korniyenko. Following a two-day rendezvous and docking maneuver with the ISS, she joined Expedition 23 as a flight engineer and transferred on June 2, 2010, to Expedition 24 again as a flight engineer after the departure of the Soyuz TMA-17.

During the first half of her flight, Caldwell Dyson and the Expedition 23 crew were joined by the STS-131 crew from April 7 to April 17. This period was the first and only time that four women were together on board the same spacecraft: Caldwell Dyson, NASA astronauts Stephanie Wilson and Dorothy Metcalf-Lindenburger, and JAXA astronaut Naoko Yamazaki. From May 16 to May 23, the second and last Space Shuttle visiting mission for Caldwell-Dyson's flight, STS-132, joined the Expedition 23 crew for the installation of the Russian-built module Rassvet.

The second half of Caldwell Dyson's mission was marked by the failure of a coolant pump at the beginning of August. Caldwell Dyson performed her first spacewalk on August 7, 2010, with NASA astronaut Douglas Wheelock. The task for this first of three contingency EVAs was to prepare the malfunctioning coolant pump for replacement on the next spacewalks; this took place on August 11, 2010, and August 16, 2010. She performed all of this contingency EVA.

After 176 days, 1 hour, 18 minutes and 38 seconds in space, Caldwell Dyson landed in Kazakhstan on September 25, 2010. During this spaceflight, she completed three spacewalks, logging 22 hrs and 49 minutes of EVA work to replace a malfunctioning coolant pump.

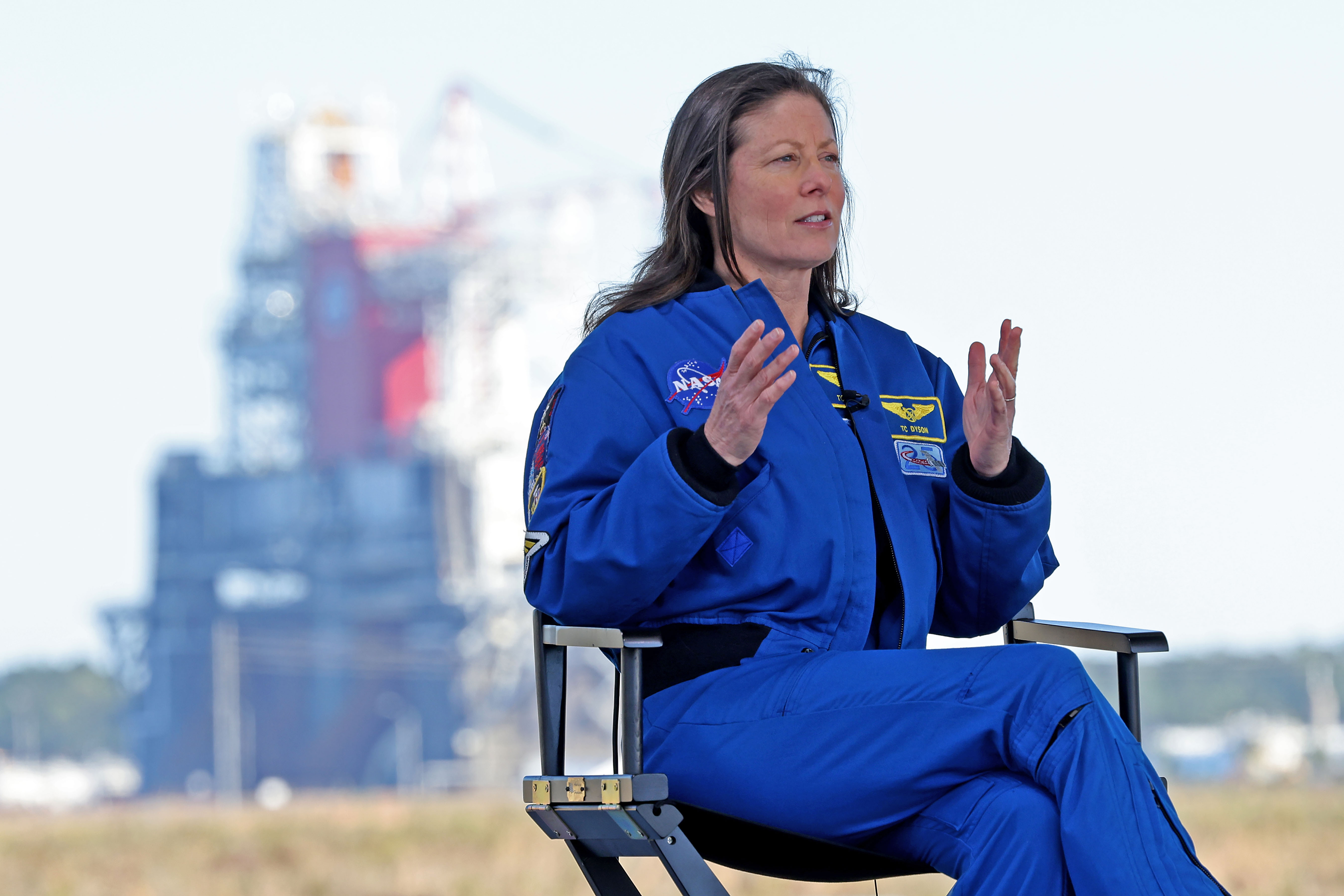
Tracy Caldwell Dyson during live coverage of a SLS Green Run Test

==== Expedition 70/71 ====
Caldwell Dyson returned to flight training as a backup crew member for the Soyuz MS-24. She backed up her NASA astronaut colleague Loral O'Hara. She was officially assigned to the Soyuz MS-25 in 2023.

Her first attempt to launch on the Soyuz MS-25 mission on March 21, 2024 was aborted with 20 seconds left before lift-off. The scrub occurred because of a low voltage reading in the Soyuz rocket electrical system. She launched on March 23, 2024 with Roscosmos cosmonaut Oleg Novitsky and Belarusian cosmonaut Marina Vasilevskaya. After a two-day rendezvous profile, the Soyuz crew docked with International Space Station's Prichal module on March 25, 2024. The first weeks of her mission dealt with the SpaceX CRS-30 mission, as well as viewing the total eclipse above North America on April 8, 2024 and the redocking of SpaceX Crew-8 in early May.

Starting in mid-May, Expedition 71 crew focused themselves on the preparation for the three planned EVAs. During this period, the crew checked out EMUs, tools, and reviewed procedures. They also performed maintenance tasks around station as well as continued scientific work.

On June 6, Caldwell Dyson saw the arrival of the first crewed mission of Starliner. The Starliner crew was composed of Barry Wilmore and Sunita Williams. Caldwell Dyson monitored the arrival of Starliner alongside Matthew Dominick and helped the Starliner crew to accomplish their test flight objectives including testing the spacecraft habitability for four crew members and its capability as a safe haven in case of an emergency.

On June 24, Caldwell Dyson participated as a crew member for EVA 90 with Michael Barratt. Unfortunately, this EVA ended early due to a water leak in the service and cooling umbilical unit on Caldwell-Dyson’s spacesuit. The leak came from the SCU when Caldwell-Dyson disconnected her SCU from her EMU after she switched to battery power. The total EVA time was only 31 minutes.

All of their EVAs were postponed to a later date after the incident, and Expedition 71 remained focused on their scientific work, cargo vehicle traffic, and maintenance tasks. More specifically, they saw the departure of Cygnus NG-20 named after Dyson's classmate: Patricia Hilliard Robertson on July 12th and the arrival of Cygnus NG-21 - Francis Scobee on August 6th.

Caldwell Dyson spent six months on the station and returned on September 23, 2024 with Oleg Kononenko and Nikolai Chub on the Soyuz MS-25 spacecraft.

== Other activities ==
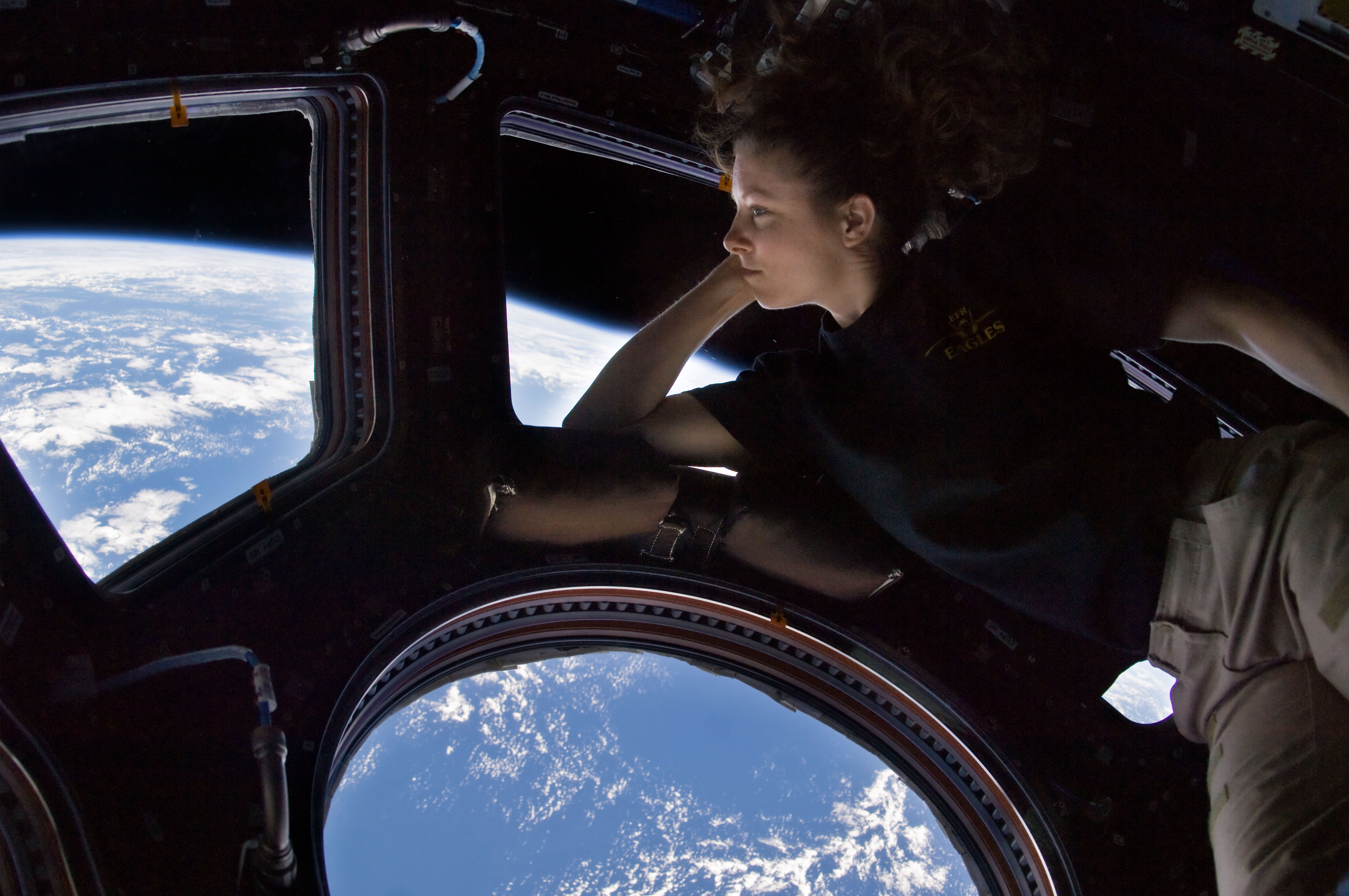
Caldwell Dyson observing Earth from the Cupola module of the International Space Station

Caldwell Dyson is a private pilot. She is conversational in American Sign Language and Russian.

She is also the lead vocalist for the all-astronaut band Max Q.

In 2011, Caldwell Dyson served as the guest judge on a space-themed episode of the Food Network show Cupcake Wars. She appeared on Episode 3 of MasterChef Junior Season 4.

Caldwell Dyson advised Jessica Chastain when the actress was preparing to appear as an astronaut and mission commander in the 2015 movie The Martian. Chastain said she was very inspired by Caldwell Dyson.

Caldwell Dyson is a member of Sigma Xi Research Society and the American Chemical Society.

== Personal life ==
Caldwell Dyson is married to U.S. Naval aviator George Dyson.

She is a Christian, a member of the Providence Baptist Church in Pasadena, Texas.

== Awards and honors ==
- Honorary Doctorate, California State University, Fullerton (CSUF) (May 2008)
- NASA Performance Award (2002 & 2001)
- NASA Go the Extra Mile (GEM) Award (2001)
- NASA Superior Accomplishment Award (2000)
- NASA Group Achievement Award – Russian Crusader Team (2000)
- Camille and Henry Dreyfus Postdoctoral Fellowship in Environmental Science (1997)
- Outstanding Doctoral Student Award in Chemistry from the University of California, Davis (1997)
- American Vacuum Society – HWhetten Award (1996)
- American Vacuum Society Graduate Research Award (1996)
- Pro Femina Research Consortium Graduate Research Award (1996)
- Pro Femina Research Consortium Graduate Award for Scientific Travel (1996)
- University of California, Davis Graduate Research Award (1996)
- University of California, Davis Graduate Student Award for Scientific Travel (1994)
- Patricia Roberts Harris Graduate Fellowship in Chemistry (1993–1997)
- Lyle Wallace Award for Service to the Department of Chemistry, California State University Fullerton (1993)
- National Science Foundation Research Experience for Undergraduates Award (1992)
- Council of Building & Construction Trades Scholarship (1991 and 1992)
- Big West Scholar Athlete (1989–1991)
