= Soyuz MS-24 =

2023 Russian crewed spaceflight to the ISS

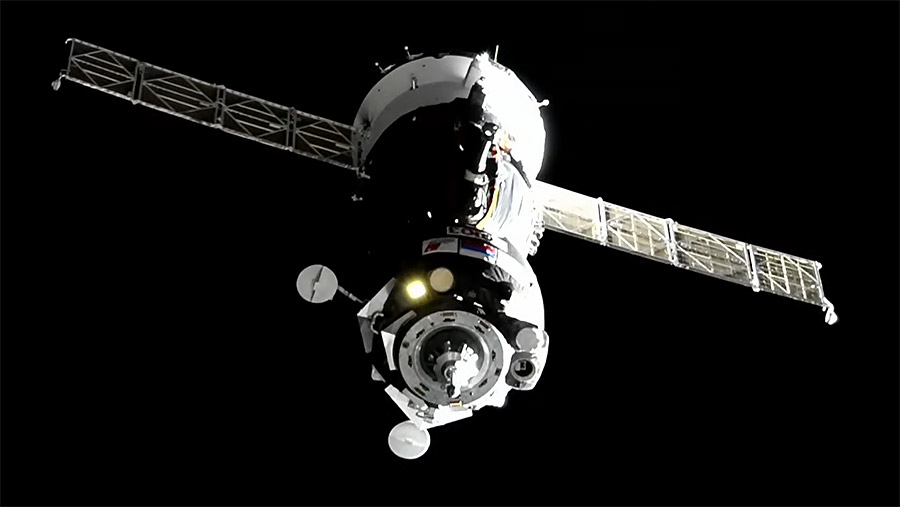
- Soyuz MS-24 approaching the ISS
- Names: ISS 70S
- Mission type: ISS crew transport
- Operator: Roscosmos
- COSPAR ID: 2023-143A
- SATCAT no.: 57862
- Mission duration: 203 days, 15 hours, 33 minutes and 12 seconds

Spacecraft properties
- Spacecraft: Soyuz MS-25 No. 755
- Spacecraft type: Soyuz MS
- Manufacturer: Energia

Crew
- Crew size: 3
- Members: Loral O'Hara
- Launching: Oleg Kononenko; Nikolai Chub
- Landing: Oleg Novitsky; Maryna Vasileuskaya
- Callsign: Antares

Start of mission
- Launch date: 15 September 2023, 15:44:35 UTC
- Rocket: Soyuz-2.1a
- Launch site: Baikonur, Site 31/6
- Contractor: RKTs Progress

End of mission
- Landing date: 6 April 2024, 07:17:47 UTC
- Landing site: Kazakh Steppe, Kazakhstan (47°25′6.12″N 69°38′56.22″E)

Orbital parameters
- Reference system: Geocentric orbit
- Regime: Low Earth orbit
- Inclination: 51.659°

Docking with ISS
- Docking port: Rassvet nadir
- Docking date: 15 September 2023, 18:53:32 UTC
- Undocking date: 6 April 2024, 03:54:58 UTC
- Time docked: 203 days, 9 hours, 1 minute and 26 seconds
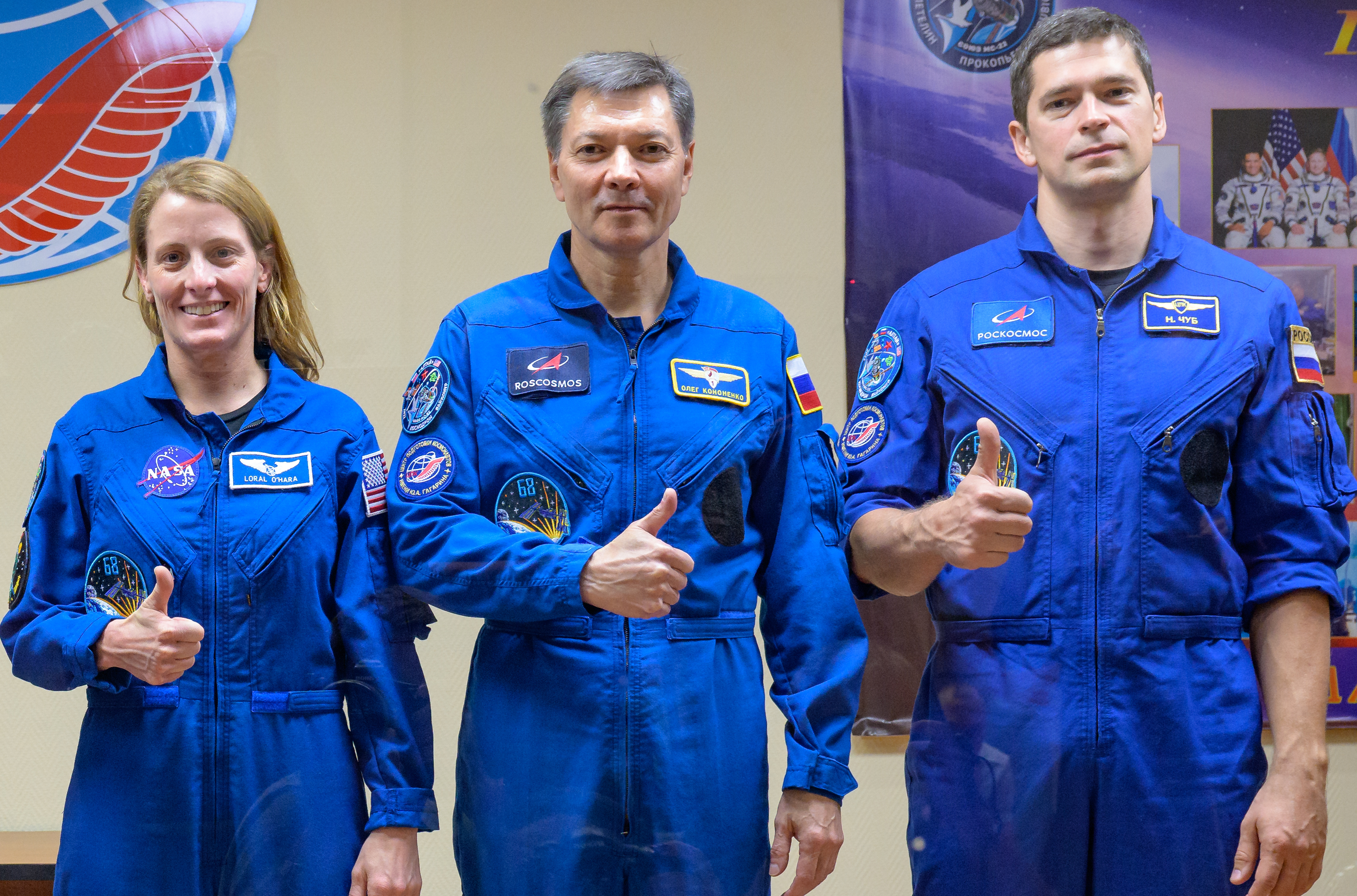
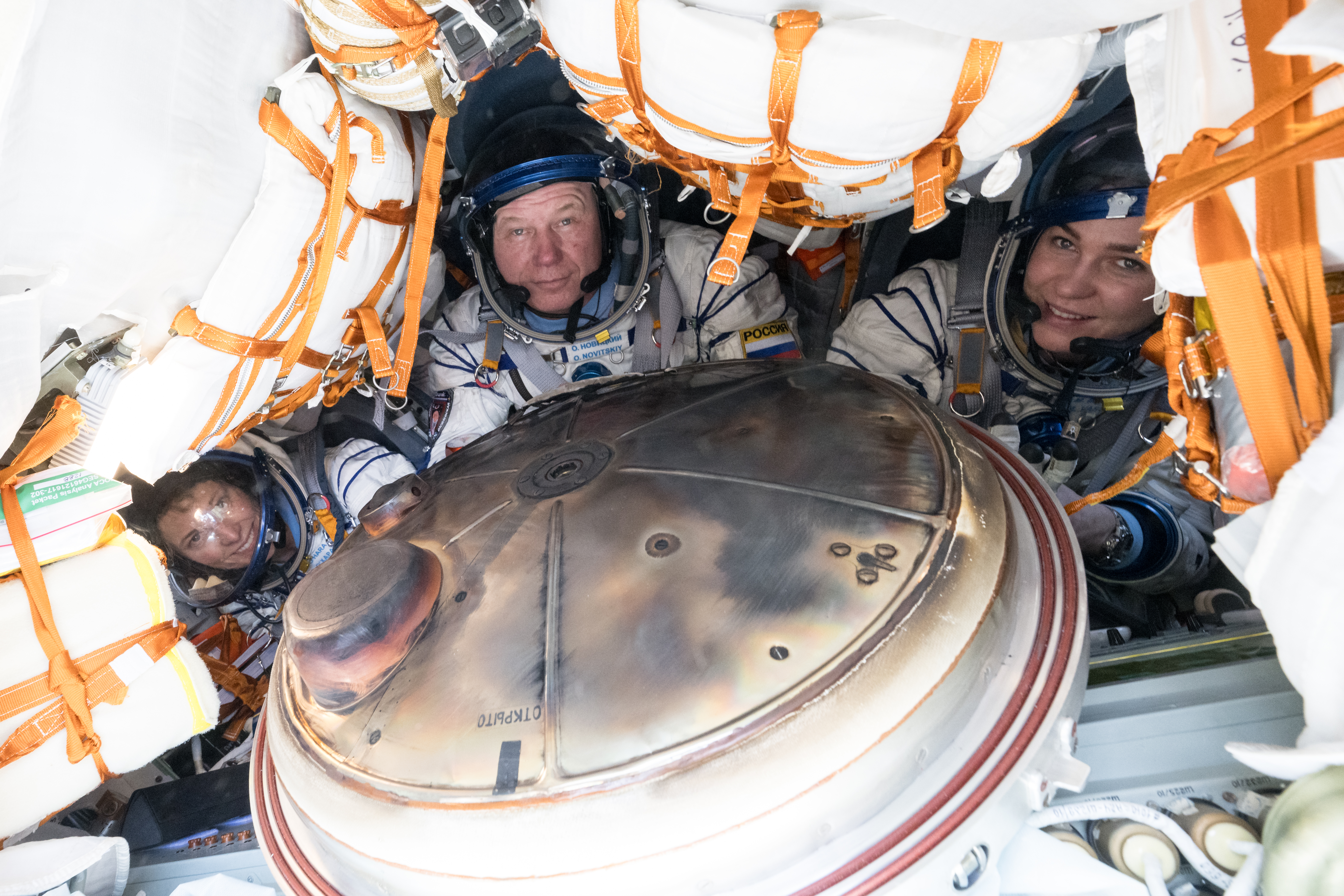
- Mission patches: launch (left) and landing (right) Top: launching crew, from left: O'Hara, Kononenko, and Chub; Bottom: landing crew, from left: O'Hara, Novitsky, and Vasileuskaya Soyuz programme (crewed)

Soyuz MS-24, Russian production No. 755 and identified by NASA as Soyuz 70S, was a Russian crewed Soyuz spaceflight launched from Baikonur on 15 September 2023 to the International Space Station.

== Crew ==
The crew was originally assigned to Soyuz MS-23, but they were moved to MS-24 due to a coolant leak on Soyuz MS-22 that required MS-23 to be launched uncrewed as its replacement and returned to Earth uncrewed. Oleg Kononenko was assigned for a one year long mission with his MS-24 crewmate Nikolai Chub that started on September 15, 2023. As the mission lasted 374 days, Kononenko spent a total of 1,111 days in space. He exceeded the previous record of 878 days held by Gennady Padalka on 4 February 2024. He later became the first person to stay 900, 1,000, and 1,100 days in space on 25 February 2024, 4 June 2024, and 12 September 2024 respectively.

Prime crew
Position	Launching crew member	Landing crew member
Commander	Oleg Kononenko, Roscosmos; Expedition 69/70/71; Fifth spaceflight	Oleg Novitsky, Roscosmos; 21st Visiting Expedition; Fourth and last spaceflight
Flight engineer/Spaceflight participant	Nikolai Chub, Roscosmos; Expedition 69/70/71; First spaceflight	Maryna Vasileuskaya, Belarus Space Agency; 21st Visiting Expedition; First spaceflight
Flight engineer	Loral O'Hara, NASA; Expedition 69/70; First spaceflight	

Backup crew
Position	Crew member
Commander	Aleksey Ovchinin, Roscosmos
Flight engineer	(United States) Tracy Caldwell-Dyson, NASA

== Undocking and Return ==
At the end of Expedition 70, O'Hara returned to Earth on Soyuz MS-24 with Roscosmos cosmonaut Oleg Novitsky and Belarusian spaceflight participant Marina Vasilevskaya (both on ISS EP-21) on 6 April 2024. On the other hand, Kononenko and Chub remained onboard the orbital laboratory for a year and returned to Earth with NASA astronaut Tracy Caldwell-Dyson on Soyuz MS-25. As the mission lasted 374 days, Kononenko spent a total of 1,111 days in space by the time he returned to Earth. He broke the world record of 878 days in space held by Gennady Padalka on February 4, 2024 at 07:30:08 UTC. He later became the first person to stay 900, 1,000, and 1,100 days in space on 25 February 2024, 4 June 2024, and 12 September 2024 respectively.
