= Soyuz MS-25 =

2024 Russian crewed spaceflight to the ISS

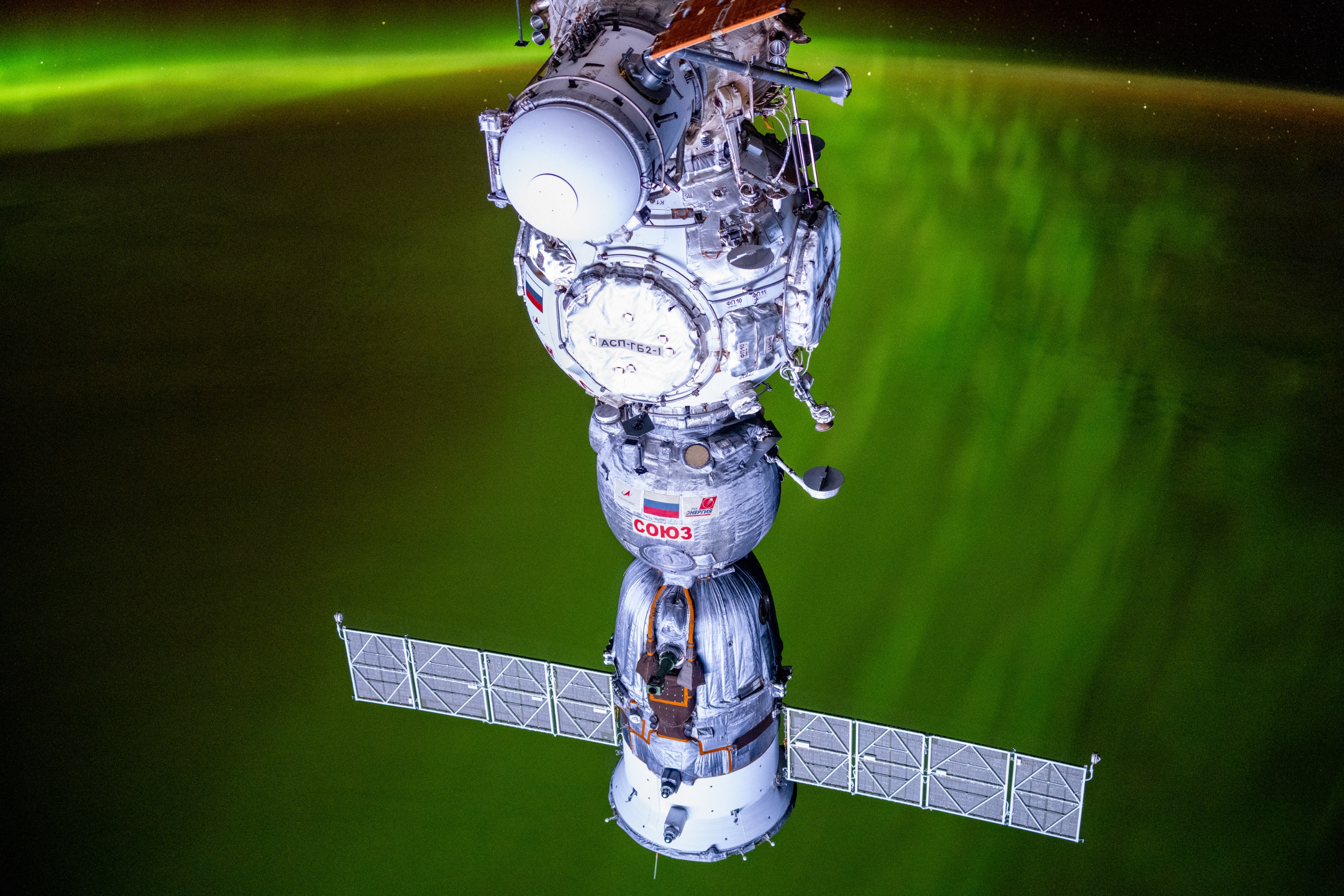
- Soyuz MS-25 illuminated by an aurora
- Names: ISS 71S
- Mission type: ISS crew transport
- Operator: Roscosmos
- COSPAR ID: 2024-055A
- SATCAT no.: 59294
- Mission duration: 183 days, 23 hours, 22 minutes and 54 seconds
- Distance travelled: 126,000,000 km (78,000,000 mi)
- Orbits completed: 2,944

Spacecraft properties
- Spacecraft: Soyuz MS-25 No. 756
- Spacecraft type: Soyuz MS
- Manufacturer: Energia
- Launch mass: 7,152 kg (15,767 lb)

Crew
- Crew size: 3
- Members: Tracy Caldwell Dyson
- Launching: Oleg Novitsky; Maryna Vasileuskaya
- Landing: Oleg Kononenko; Nikolai Chub
- Callsign: Kazbek

Start of mission
- Launch date: 23 March 2024, 12:36:10 UTC
- Rocket: Soyuz-2.1a No. 15000-066
- Launch site: Baikonur, Site 31/6
- Contractor: RKTs Progress

End of mission
- Landing date: 23 September 2024, 11:59:04 UTC
- Landing site: Kazakh Steppe, Kazakhstan (47°21′00″N 69°38′00″E)

Orbital parameters
- Reference system: Geocentric orbit
- Regime: Low Earth orbit
- Inclination: 51.66°

Docking with ISS
- Docking port: Prichal nadir
- Docking date: 25 March 2024, 15:02:51 UTC
- Undocking date: 23 September 2024, 08:36:30 UTC
- Time docked: 181 days, 17 hours, 33 minutes and 39 seconds
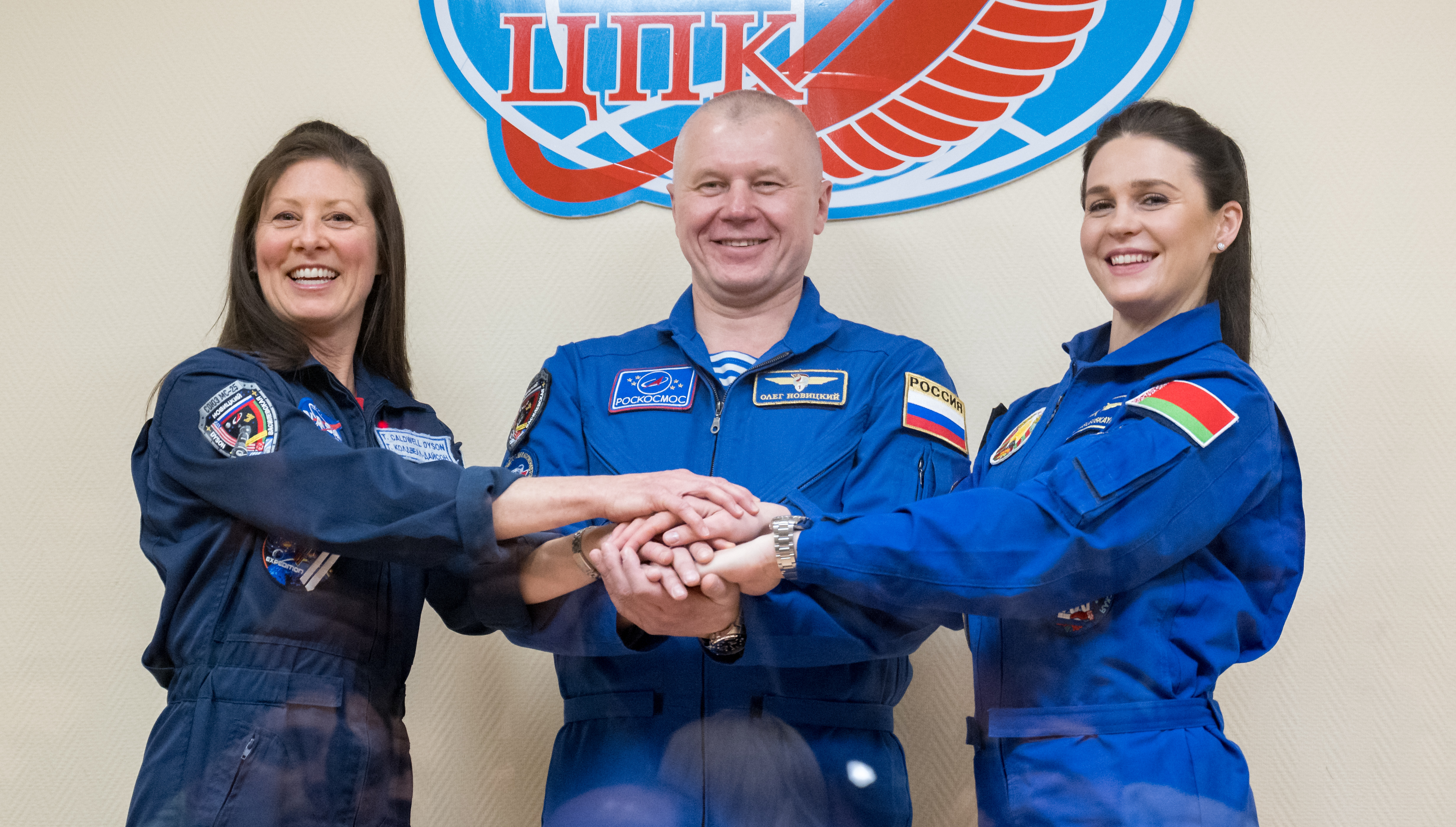
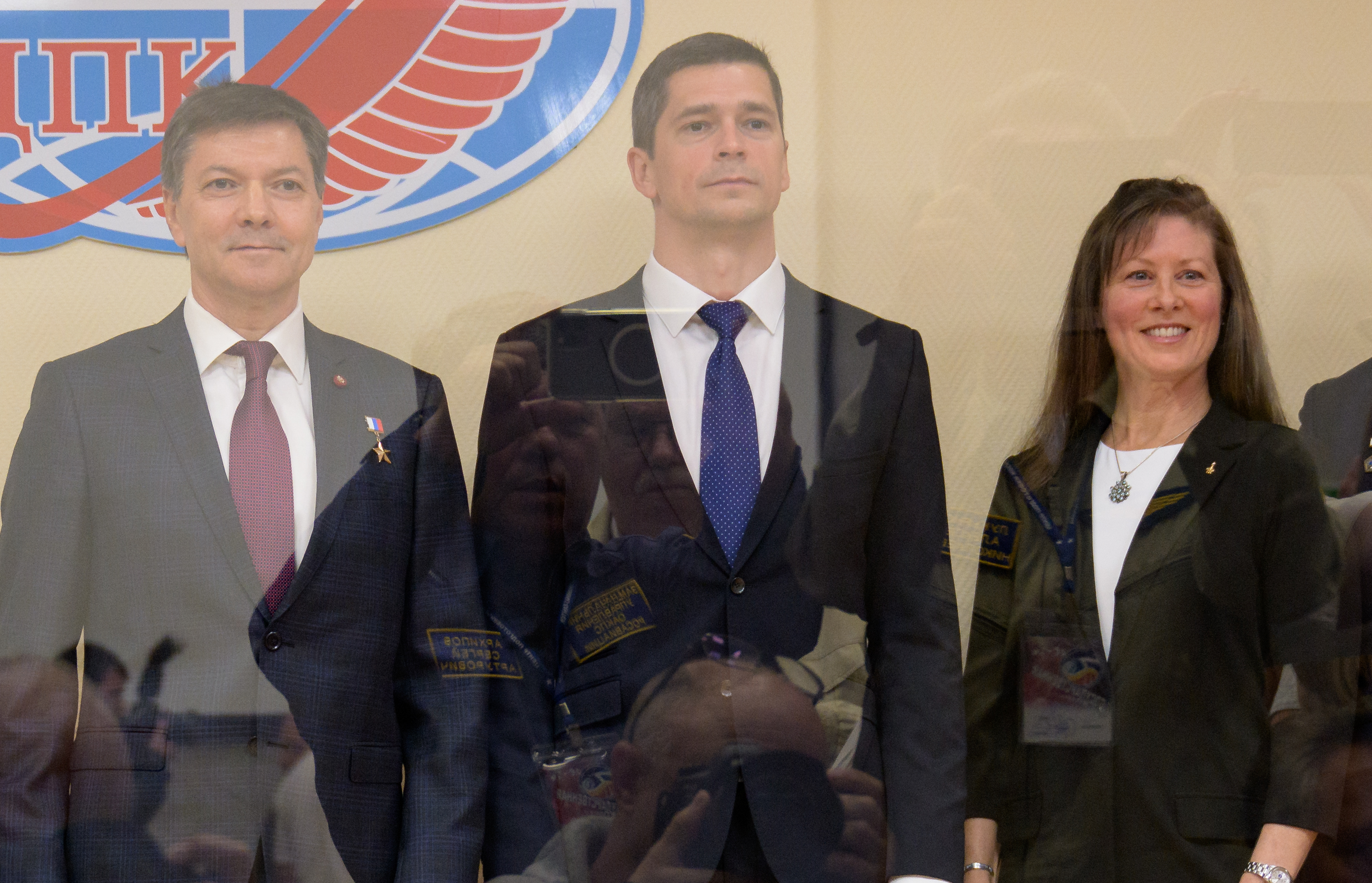
- Mission patches: launch (left) and landing (right) Top: launching crew, from left: Dyson, Novitsky, and Vasileuskaya; Bottom: landing crew, from left: Kononenko, Chub, and Dyson Soyuz programme

Soyuz MS-25, Russian production No. 756 and identified by NASA as Soyuz 71S, was a 2024 Russian crewed Soyuz spaceflight from Baikonur Cosmodrome to the International Space Station.

== Crew ==
MS-25 saw was the first launch of two women, Tracy Caldwell-Dyson from the United States and Maryna Vasileuskaya from Belarus, aboard a Soyuz spacecraft. MS-25 also saw the launch of two people from Belarus, as the mission commander, Oleg Novitsky was born in Chervyen, when it was part of the Byelorussian Soviet Socialist Republic.

Prime crew
Position	Launching crew member	Landing crew member
Commander	Oleg Novitsky, Roscosmos; 21st Visiting Expedition; Fourth and last spaceflight	Oleg Kononenko, Roscosmos; Expedition 69/70/71; Fifth spaceflight
Spaceflight participant/Flight engineer	Maryna Vasileuskaya, Belarus Space Agency; 21st Visiting Expedition; First spaceflight	Nikolai Chub, Roscosmos; Expedition 69/70/71; First spaceflight
Flight engineer	Tracy Caldwell-Dyson, NASA; Expedition 70/71; Third spaceflight	

Backup crew
Position	Crew
Commander	Ivan Vagner, Roscosmos
Spaceflight participant	Anastasia Lenkova, Belarus Space Agency
Flight engineer	Donald Pettit, NASA

== Flight ==
Attempt	Planned	Result	Turnaround	Reason	Decision point	Weather go (%)	Notes
1	21 Mar 2024, 9:21:00 am	Scrubbed	—	Weather	21 Mar 2024, 9:21 am (T−00:00:20)	45%	The automatic launch sequence aborted the countdown at just 20 seconds before liftoff due to a sudden voltage drop in the booster's electrical system. The crew remained safe and was quickly extracted.
2	23 Mar 2024, 8:36:00 am	Success	1 day 23 hours 15 minutes			50%	

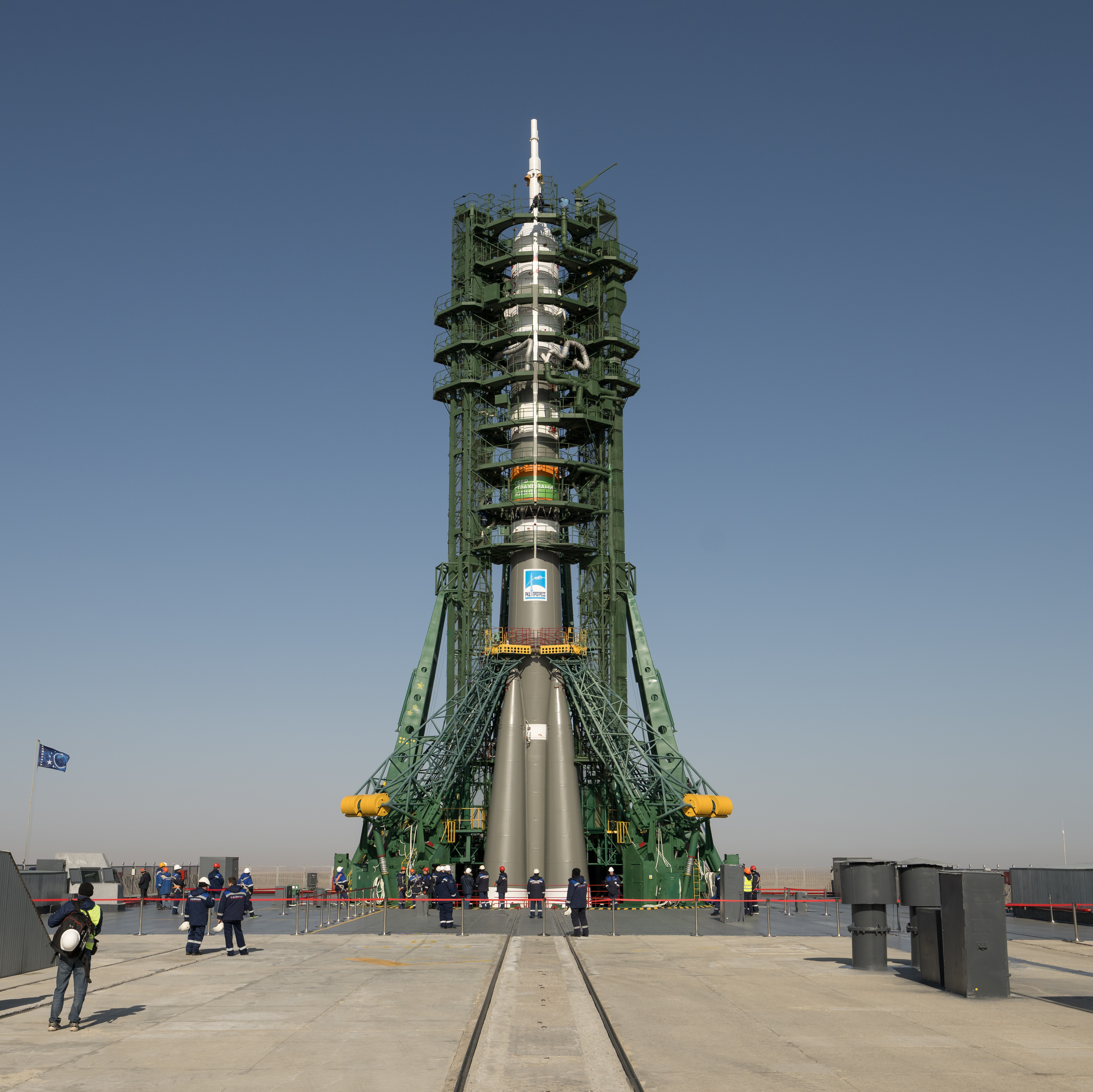
Soyuz MS-25 rolled out to Pad 31/6

It was originally scheduled for launch on 21 March 2024, but due to a voltage drop in one of the power generators, the launch was aborted. The second launch attempt on 23 March 2024 was successful.

Caldwell-Dyson spent approximately six months aboard the International Space Station. Novitsky and Vasileuskaya of Belarus spent approximately 13 days aboard the orbital complex as a part of 21st ISS visiting expedition before returning aboard Soyuz MS-24.

== Undocking and Return ==
At the end of Expedition 71, Caldwell-Dyson returned to Earth on Soyuz MS-25 with Roscosmos cosmonauts Oleg Kononenko and Nikolai Chub on 23 September 2024. They arrived with NASA astronaut Loral O'Hara on Soyuz MS-24 on 15 September 2023. O'Hara returned to Earth on MS-24 with Novitsky and Vasileuskaya. Kononenko and Chub remained aboard the orbital laboratory for a year. As the mission lasted 374 days, Kononenko spent a total of 1,111 days in space by the time he returned to Earth. He broke the world record of 878 days in space held by Gennady Padalka on February 4, 2024 at 07:30:08 UTC. He later became the first person to stay 900, 1,000, and 1,100 days in space on 25 February 2024, 4 June 2024, and 12 September 2024 respectively.
