= Maryna Vasileuskaya =

Belarusian spaceflight participant (born 1990)

- Марына Васілеўская (Belarusian); Марина Василевская (Russian)
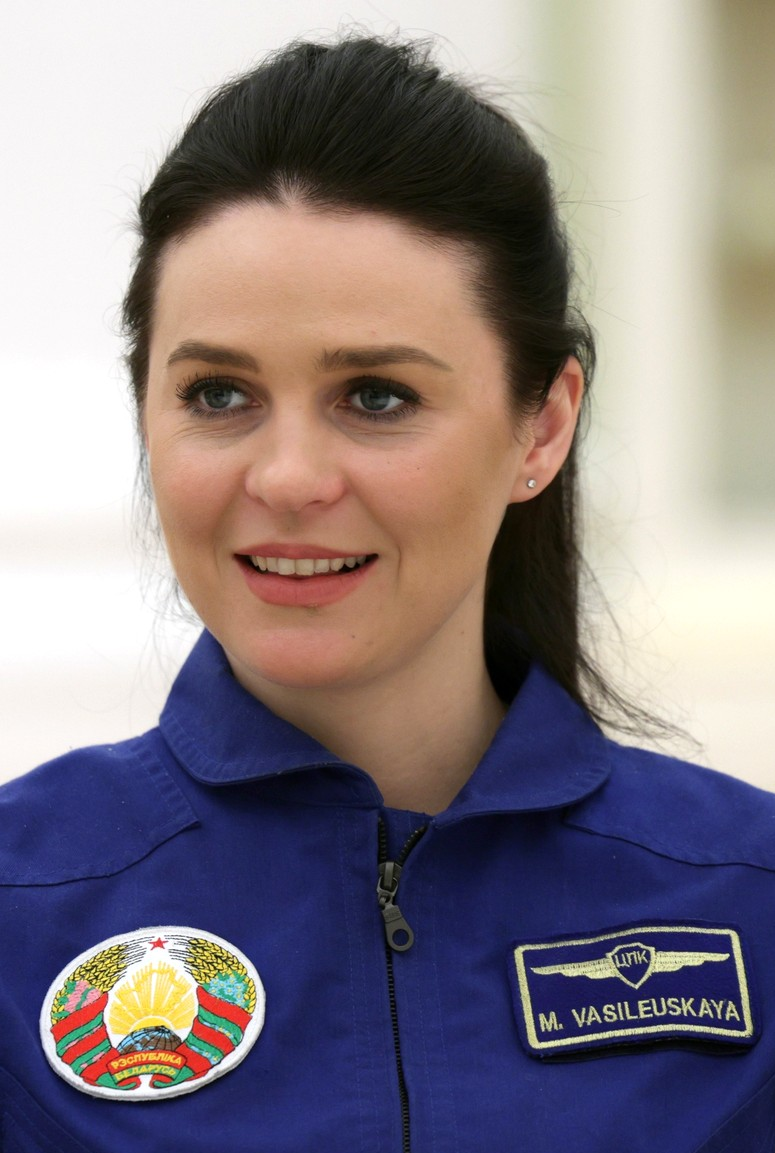
- Born: 14 September 1990 (age 36); Minsk, Byelorussian SSR, Soviet Union (now Belarus)
- Occupation: Flight attendant
- Organization(s): Belavia
- Space career

Belarus Space Agency spaceflight participant
- Time in space: 13 days, 18 hours and 41 minutes
- Missions: Soyuz MS-25/MS-24

Maryna Vitaleuna Vasileuskaya (Belarusian: Марына Віталеўна Васілеўская; born 14 September 1990) is a Belarusian cosmonaut and flight attendant for Belavia Airlines. She is the first Belarusian woman to be launched into space.

== Biography ==
Maryna Vasileuskaya graduated from secondary school No. 151 in Minsk.

She is a flight attendant and instructor for Belavia Airlines, working on Boeing and Embraer aircraft.

She started dancing around 2002, when she was 12. Soon after completing school, she practiced ballroom dancing professionally for 15 years before joining the airline.

She is passionate about interior design, and enjoys going to the swimming pool, doing aerobics, playing badminton tennis, and gardening.

== Space mission ==
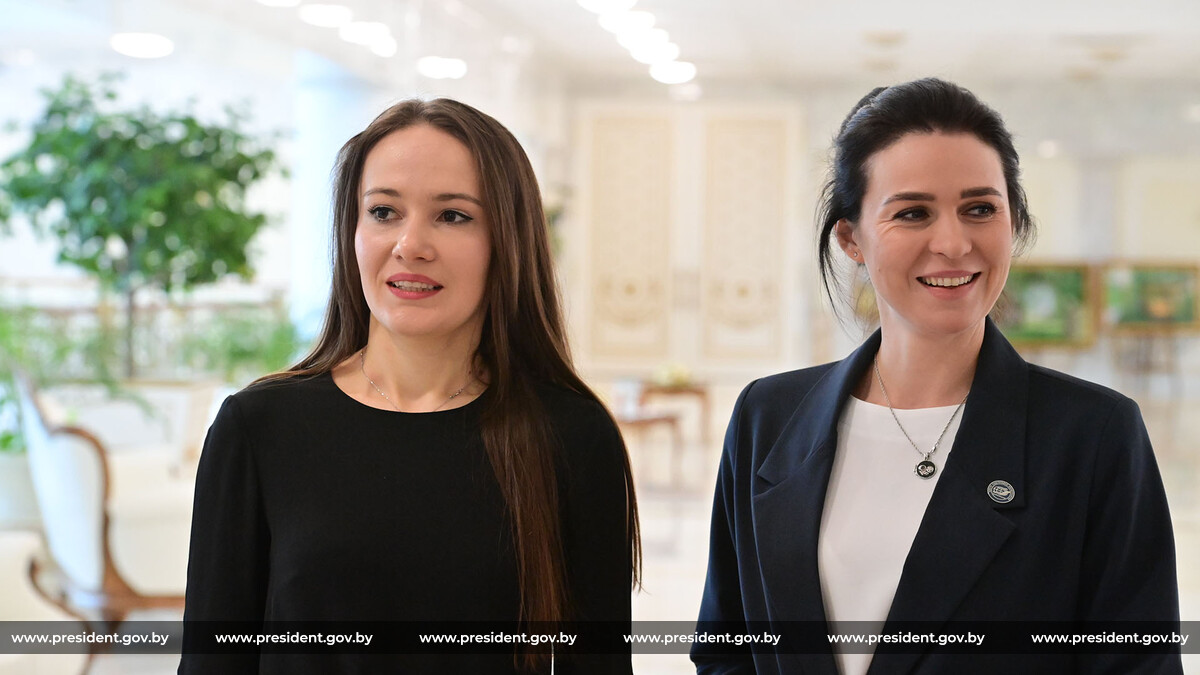
Anastasia Lenkova (left) and Maryna Vasileuskaya (right)

In December 2022, during a competitive selection held in Belarus, she was selected among six applicants from more than three thousand women to participate in a space flight under the "Belarusian Woman in Space" project on the Russian Soyuz spacecraft to ISS for a short duration mission. This contest was organised by Belarus Academy of Sciences. The other five were another flight attendant, two doctors, and two scientists.

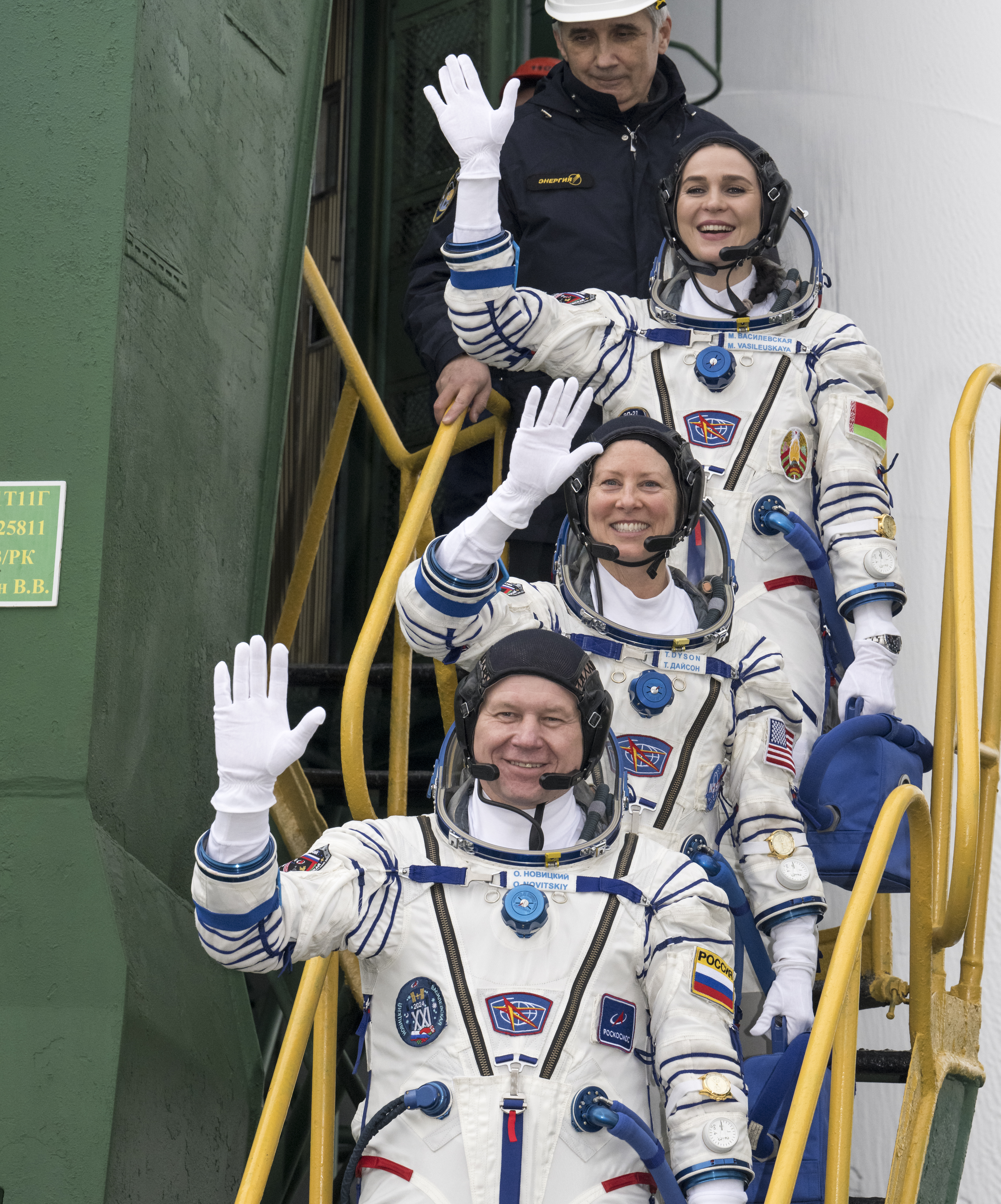
Vasileuskaya before launch

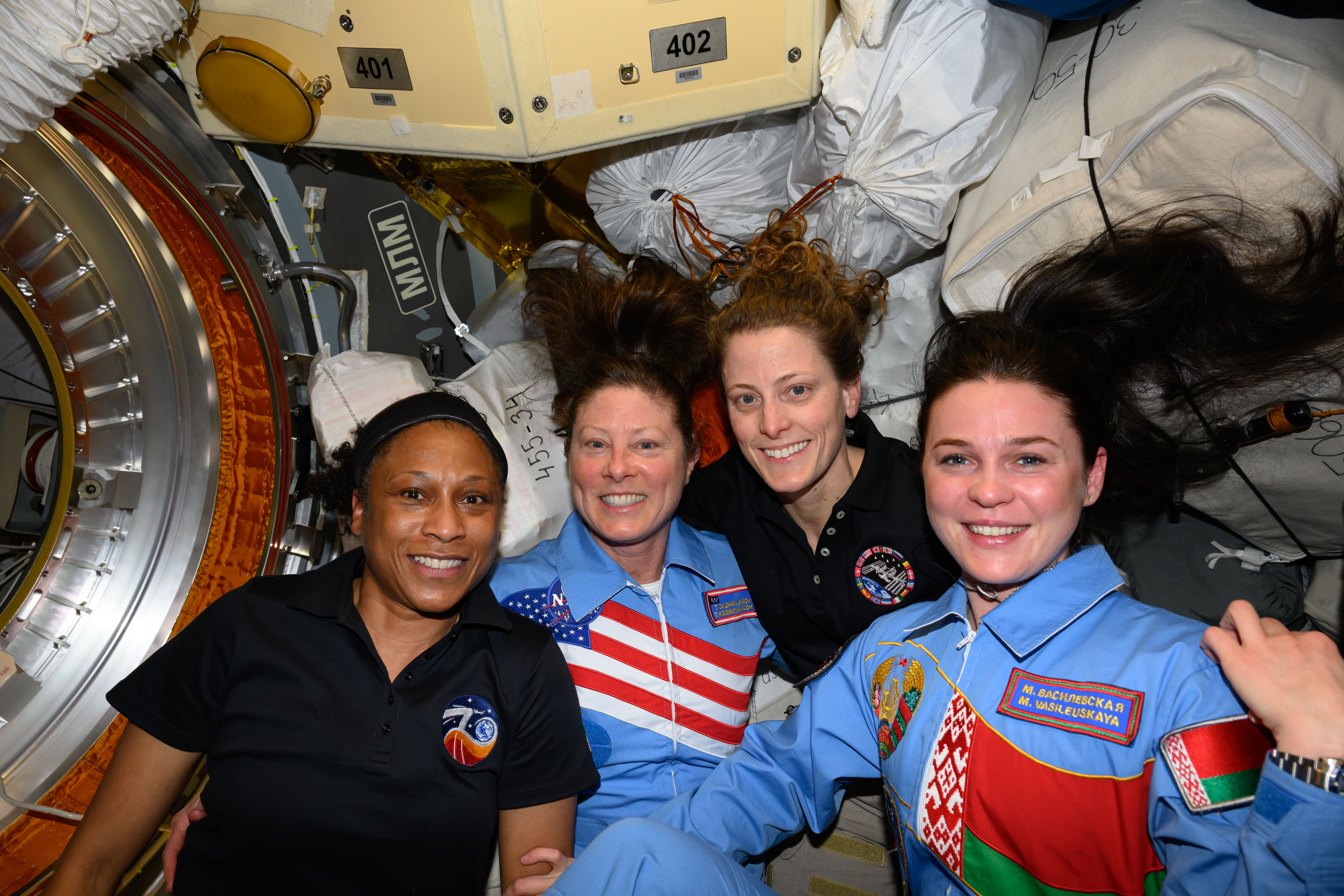
Vasileuskaya on ISS

In May 2023, she was one of the two remaining candidates (Anastasia Lenkova, being the other selected as her backup) following the Belarus Space Agency selection to fly aboard Soyuz MS-25 as a spaceflight participant in March 2024. She was designated as a member of prime crew of ISS EP-21.

On 24 July 2023, she commenced theoretical and practical training for the flight at the Yuri A. Gagarin Cosmonaut Training Center in Star City, Russia. In October, she began practical training on the Soyuz MS spacecraft simulator to conduct routine flight and undocking operations, and underwent training in zero gravity conditions on the Ilyushin II-76 laboratory aircraft. In December, together with Oleg Novitsky, she conducted training on the actions of astronauts in the event of an emergency landing in a wooded and swampy area in winter. She is not trained for the US Orbital Segment as she only worked on the Russian Orbital Segment of ISS.

She traveled to the station with Roscosmos cosmonaut Oleg Novitsky and NASA astronaut Tracy Caldwell-Dyson, where she and Novitsky spent approximately 13 days aboard the orbital complex as a part of the 21st ISS visiting expedition. She and Novitsky returned to Earth aboard the Soyuz MS-24 with NASA astronaut Loral O'Hara on 6 April 2024.
