= List of visiting expeditions to the International Space Station =

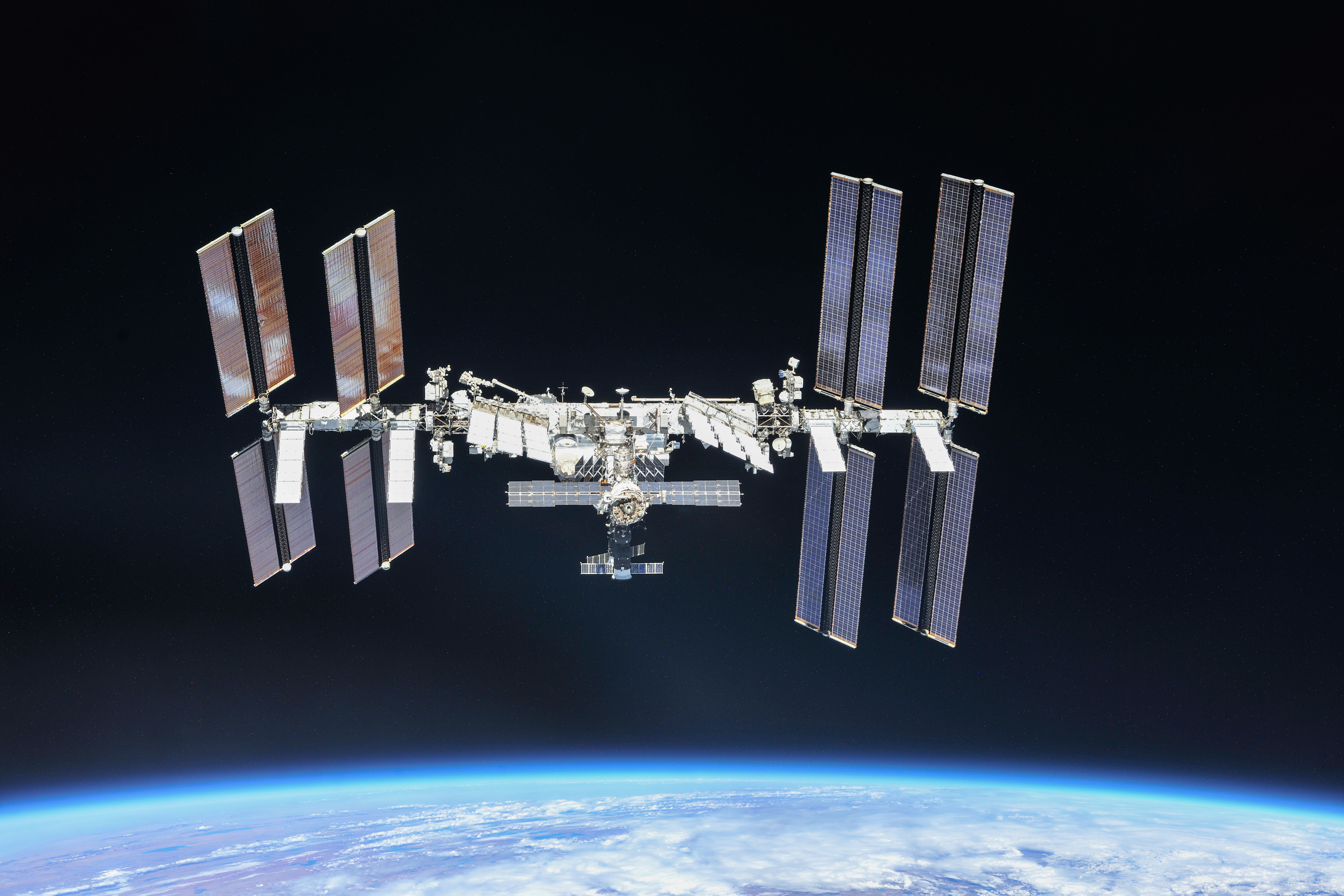
International Space Station in 2018.

Visiting expeditions to the International Space Station are teams of one to three astronauts who visit the ISS by Soyuz on short duration expeditions. EP-N is a term used by RKK Energia, meaning both "Visiting Crew" as "Visiting Expedition".

Humans have been on the ISS on a temporary basis since December 1998 and on a permanent basis since November 2000. The permanent occupation of the station is carried out by core crews, who usually stay for six months. Along with this, space shuttles have also been to the ISS during the construction of the station.

Three-seat, single-use Soyuz serve as lifeboats on the ISS, changing every six months. If transporting the core members does not fully occupy the Soyuz, the ships end up being crewed by astronauts returning after a week or ten days on the space shuttle (usually representatives of space agencies other than Russia or space tourists) or by the Soyuz. These crew members are the "visiting team" and their expeditions are called "visiting expeditions" (Russian: экспедиция посещения, or ЭП). In the period 2000–2002, when crews were switched to the space shuttle, visiting expeditions ended up being three people. From 2003 to 2009, there was only one seat available on the Soyuz in addition to two main crew seats. Since 2009, the main crews have been six crew members and the Soyuz was solely used for its transportation until the Crew Dragon launch. The next short visit did not occur until September 2015, in connection with the one-year mission to the ISS, and then in 2019.

Continued international collaboration on ISS missions has been thrown into doubt by the 2022 Russian invasion of Ukraine and related sanctions on Russia.

== List ==
- Dates beside "Expedition X" are from the stay at the station.

Flights with space tourists.

| Nº | Crew | Image | Launch (UTC) | Landing (UTC) | Backup | Ref. |
|---|---|---|---|---|---|---|
1st Visiting Expedition; 30 April 2001 – 6 May 2001
| 1 | (Russia) Talgat Musabayev (Russia) Yuri Baturin (United States) Dennis Tito (Note: Space tourist) | | 28 April 2001; 07:37:19 (Soyuz TM-32) | 6 May 2001; 05:41:28 (Soyuz TM-31) | (Russia) Viktor Afanasyev (Russia) Konstantin Kozeyev | |
| 1 | (Russia) Talgat Musabayev (Russia) Yuri Baturin (United States) Dennis Tito | | 7d 22h 4m 9s | | (Russia) Viktor Afanasyev (Russia) Konstantin Kozeyev | |
2nd Visiting Expedition; Andromeda Program; 23 October 2001 – 31 October 2001
| 2 | (Russia) Viktor Afanasyev (France) Claudie Haigneré (Russia) Konstantin Kozeyev | | 21 October 2001; 08:59:34 (Soyuz TM-33) | 31 October 2001; 04:59:25 (Soyuz TM-32) | (Russia) Sergei Zalyotin (Russia) Nadezhda Kuzhelnaya | |
| 2 | (Russia) Viktor Afanasyev (France) Claudie Haigneré (Russia) Konstantin Kozeyev | | 9d 19h 59m 51s | | (Russia) Sergei Zalyotin (Russia) Nadezhda Kuzhelnaya | |
3rd Visiting Expedition; Marco Polo Program; 27 April 2002 – 5 May 2002
| 3 | (Russia) Yuri Gidzenko (Italy) Roberto Vittori (South Africa) Mark Shuttleworth | | 25 April 2002; 06:26:35 (Soyuz TM-34) | 5 May 2002; 03:51:40 (Soyuz TM-33) | (Russia) Gennady Padalka (Russia) Oleg Kononenko | |
| 3 | (Russia) Yuri Gidzenko (Italy) Roberto Vittori (South Africa) Mark Shuttleworth | | 9d 21h 25m 5s | | (Russia) Gennady Padalka (Russia) Oleg Kononenko | |
4th Visiting Expedition; Odissea Program; 1 November 2002 – 9 November 2002
| 4 | (Russia) Sergei Zalyotin (Belgium) Frank De Winne (Russia) Yuri Lonchakov | | 30 October 2002; 03:11:10 (Soyuz TMA-1) | 10 November 2002; 00:04:20 (Soyuz TM-34) | (Russia) Yuri Lonchakov (Russia) Aleksandr Lazutkin | |
| 4 | (Russia) Sergei Zalyotin (Belgium) Frank De Winne (Russia) Yuri Lonchakov | | 10d 20h 53m 10s | | (Russia) Yuri Lonchakov (Russia) Aleksandr Lazutkin | |
5th Visiting Expedition; Cervantes Program; 20 October 2003 – 27 October 2003
| 5 | (Spain) Pedro Duque | | 18 October 2003; 05:38:03 (Soyuz TMA-3) | 28 October 2003; 02:40:20 (Soyuz TMA-2) | (Netherlands) André Kuipers | |
| 5 | (Spain) Pedro Duque | | 9d 21h 2m 17s | | (Netherlands) André Kuipers | |
6th Visiting Expedition; Delta Program; 21 April 2004 – 29 April 2004
| 6 | (Netherlands) André Kuipers | | 19 April 2004; 03:19:00 (Soyuz TMA-4) | 30 April 2004; 00:11:15 (Soyuz TMA-3) | (Germany) Gerhard Thiele | |
| 6 | (Netherlands) André Kuipers | | 10d 20h 52m 15s | | (Germany) Gerhard Thiele | |
7th Visiting Expedition; 16 October 2004 – 24 October 2004
| 7 | (Russia) Yuri Shargin | | 14 October 2004; 03:06:27 (Soyuz TMA-5) | 24 October 2004; 00:35:08 (Soyuz TMA-4) | Without backup. | |
| 7 | (Russia) Yuri Shargin | | 9d 21h 28m 41s | | Without backup. | |
8th Visiting Expedition; Eneid Program; 17 April 2005 – 24 April 2005
| 8 | (Italy) Roberto Vittori | | 15 April 2005; 00:46:25 (Soyuz TMA-6) | 24 April 2005; 22:08:27 (Soyuz TMA-5) | (Canada) Robert Thirsk | |
| 8 | (Italy) Roberto Vittori | | 9d 21h 22m 2s | | (Canada) Robert Thirsk | |
9th Visiting Expedition; 3 October 2005 – 10 October 2005
| 9 | (United States) Gregory Olsen | | 1 October 2005; 03:54:53 (Soyuz TMA-7) | 11 October 2005; 01:09:47 (Soyuz TMA-6) | (Russia) Sergei Kostenko | |
| 9 | (United States) Gregory Olsen | | 9d 21h 14m 54s | | (Russia) Sergei Kostenko | |
10th Visiting Expedition; Missão Centenário; 1 April 2006 – 8 April 2006
| 10 | (Brazil) Marcos Pontes | | 30 March 2006; 02:30:20 (Soyuz TMA-8) | 8 April 2006; 23:47:12 (Soyuz TMA-7) | (Russia) Sergey Volkov | |
| 10 | Visiting astronaut (Note: Flew through a commercial agreement with Roscosmos as a "spaceflight participant." NASA, however, uses the term "visiting astronaut" for crew members who undergo extensive professional training and conduct scientific research aboard the station.) | | 9d 21h 16m 52s | | (Russia) Sergey Volkov | |
11th Visiting Expedition; 20 September 2006 – 29 September 2006
| 11 | (United States) Anousheh Ansari | | 19 September 2006; 04:08:42 (Soyuz TMA-9) | 29 September 2006; 01:13:37 (Soyuz TMA-8) | Without backup. | |
| 11 | (United States) Anousheh Ansari | | 9d 21h 4m 55s | | Without backup. | |
12th Visiting Expedition; 9 April 2007 – 21 April 2007
| 12 | (United States) Charles Simonyi | | 7 April 2007; 17:31:14 (Soyuz TMA-10) | 21 April 2007; 12:31:04 (Soyuz TMA-9) | Without backup. | |
| 12 | (United States) Charles Simonyi | | 13d 18h 59m 50s | | Without backup. | |
13th Visiting Expedition; 12 October 2007 – 21 October 2007
| 13 | (Malaysia) Sheikh Muszaphar Shukor | | 10 October 2007; 13:22:38 (Soyuz TMA-11) | 21 October 2007; 10:35:49 (Soyuz TMA-10) | (Malaysia) Faiz Khaleed | |
| 13 | Visiting astronaut | | 10d 21h 13m 11s | | (Malaysia) Faiz Khaleed | |
14th Visiting Expedition; Korean Astronaut Program; 10 April 2008 – 19 April 2008
| 14 | (South Korea) Yi So-yeon | | 8 April 2008; 11:16:38 (Soyuz TMA-12) | 19 April 2008; 08:29:43 (Soyuz TMA-11) | (South Korea) Ko San | |
| 14 | Visiting astronaut | | 10d 21h 13m 5s | | (South Korea) Ko San | |
15th Visiting Expedition; Generation II Astronaut; 14 October 2008 – 24 October 2008
| 15 | (United States) Richard Garriott | | 12 October 2008; 07:01:33 (Soyuz TMA-13) | 24 October 2008; 03:36:49 (Soyuz TMA-12) | (Australia) Nik Halik | |
| 15 | (United States) Richard Garriott | | 11d 20h 35m 16s | | (Australia) Nik Halik | |
16th Visiting Expedition; 28 March 2009 – 8 April 2009
| 16 | (United States) Charles Simonyi | | 26 March 2009; 11:49:18 (Soyuz TMA-14) | 8 April 2009; 07:15:09 (Soyuz TMA-13) | (United States) Esther Dyson | |
| 16 | (United States) Charles Simonyi | | 12d 19h 25m 51s | | (United States) Esther Dyson | |
17th Visiting Expedition; Poetic Social Mission; 2 October 2009 – 11 October 2009
| 17 | (Canada) Guy Laliberté | | 30 September 2009; 07:14:44 (Soyuz TMA-16) | 11 October 2009; 04:31:43 (Soyuz TMA-14) | (United States) Barbara Barrett | |
| 17 | (Canada) Guy Laliberté | | 10d 21h 16m 59s | | (United States) Barbara Barrett | |
18th Visiting Expedition; 4 September 2015 – 19 September 2015
| 18 | (Denmark) Andreas Mogensen (Kazakhstan) Aidyn Aimbetov | | 2 September 2015; 04:37:43 (Soyuz TMA-18M) | 12 September 2015; 00:51:30 (Soyuz TMA-16M) | (France) Thomas Pesquet (Russia) Sergey Prokopyev | |
| 18 | (Denmark) Andreas Mogensen (Kazakhstan) Aidyn Aimbetov | | 9d 20h 13m 47s | | (France) Thomas Pesquet (Russia) Sergey Prokopyev | |
19th Visiting Expedition; UAE Astronaut Mission 1; 25 September 2019 – 3 October 2019
| 19 | (United Arab Emirates) Hazza Al Mansouri | | 25 September 2019; 13:57:42 (Soyuz MS-15) | 3 October 2019; 10:59:21 (Soyuz MS-12) | (United Arab Emirates) Sultan Al Neyadi | |
| 19 | Visiting astronaut | | 7d 21h 1m 39s | | (United Arab Emirates) Sultan Al Neyadi | |
Visiting Expedition; Vyzov; 5 October 2021 – 17 October 2021
| – | (Russia) Klim Shipenko (Russia) Yulia Peresild | | 5 October 2021; 08:55:02 (Soyuz MS-19) | 17 October 2021; 04:35:42 (Soyuz MS-18) | (Russia) Aleksei Dudin (Russia) Alyona Mordovina | |
| – | (Russia) Klim Shipenko (Russia) Yulia Peresild | | 11d 19h 40m 40s | | (Russia) Aleksei Dudin (Russia) Alyona Mordovina | |
| – | Spaceflight participants | | 11d 19h 40m 40s | | (Russia) Aleksei Dudin (Russia) Alyona Mordovina | |
20th Visiting Expedition; 8 December 2021 – 20 December 2021
| 20 | (Russia) Aleksandr Misurkin (Japan) Yusaku Maezawa (Japan) Yozo Hirano | | 8 December 2021; 07:38:15 (Soyuz MS-20) | 20 December 2021; 03:13:18 (Soyuz MS-20) | (Russia) Alexandr Skvortsov (Japan) Shun Ogiso | |
| 20 | (Russia) Aleksandr Misurkin (Japan) Yusaku Maezawa (Japan) Yozo Hirano | | 11d 19h 35m 3s | | (Russia) Alexandr Skvortsov (Japan) Shun Ogiso | |
21st Visiting Expedition; 23 March 2024 – 6 April 2024
| 21 | (Russia) Oleg Novitsky (Belarus) Maryna Vasileuskaya | | 23 March 2024; 12:36:10 (Soyuz MS-25) | 6 April 2024; 07:17:47 (Soyuz MS-24) | (Russia) Ivan Vagner (Belarus) Anastasia Lenkova | |
| 21 | (Russia) Oleg Novitsky (Belarus) Maryna Vasileuskaya | | 13d 18h 41m 37s | | (Russia) Ivan Vagner (Belarus) Anastasia Lenkova | |

=== Cancelled ===
Expeditions canceled due to the Space Shuttle Columbia disaster.

| Crew | Launch | Duration | Backup | Ref. |
|---|---|---|---|---|
5th Visiting Expedition
| (Russia) Gennady Padalka (Spain) Pedro Duque | 28 April 2003 (Soyuz TMA-2A) | 10 days | (Russia) Sergei Krikalev (Russia) Oleg Kotov | |
6th Visiting Expedition
| (Russia) Sergei Krikalev (Netherlands) André Kuipers | 18 October 2003 (Soyuz TMA-3A) | 10 days | (Russia) Yury Onufriyenko (Russia) Oleg Skripochka | |

== See also ==
- Space tourism
- Spaceflight participant
- List of human spaceflights
- List of ESA space expeditions
- List of International Space Station expeditions
