= Belarus Space Agency =

National space agency of Belarus

- Беларускае касмічнае агенцтва (be); Белорусское космическое агентство (ru)

Agency overview
- Abbreviation: BSA
- Formed: 2009
- Type: Space agency

Belarus Space Agency (Belarusian: Беларускае касмічнае агенцтва Bielaruskaje kasmičnaje ahienctva, Russian: Белорусское космическое агентство), officially known as National Agency for Space Research (Belarusian: Нацыянальнае агенцтва па касмічным даследаванням, romanized: Natsyyanal'naye ahentstva pa kasmichnym dasledavannyam; Russian: Национальное агентство по космическим исследованиям, romanized: Natsionalnoye agentstvo po kosmicheskim issledovaniyam) is a governmental body that coordinates all Belarus space research programs with scientific and commercial goals. It was established in 2009. It is closely associated with the National Academy of Sciences of Belarus, which was responsible for Belarusian space travel until the foundation of the Belarus Space Agency.

On May 21, 2015, the agency remained as part of the National Academy of Sciences of Belarus but changed its name to National Agency for Space Researches.

== History of Belarusian space travel ==
The only Belarusians who have travelled to space are Pyotr Klimuk, Vladimir Kovalyonok, Oleg Novitsky, and Maryna Vasileuskaya. Since the dissolution of the Soviet Union Klimuk, Kovalyonok, and Novitsky have represented Russia during their missions.

Belarus together with Russia, Ukraine and Kazakhstan are making joint efforts to adapt their existing geoinformation systems to particular applications. However, no formal agreements on cooperation in the development of common Geographic information system are in place.

Belarus commenced the construction of a mission control station (MCC) as part of its long-term space program aimed at expanding cooperation with Roscosmos. This MCC will enable the country to make fuller use of a prospective group of Russian-Belarusian ERS satellites. Belarus, in partnership with Roscosmos, is developing a new high-resolution ERS satellite, the so-called “flying telescope”, which will be placed into orbit in 2015.

Having ample infrastructure and qualified personnel at its disposal, Russia remains the main provider of ERS services to other CIS countries like Belarus. A Belarusian ERS satellite is being designed in partnership with Russian companies. It will be launched by Cosmotrans from Baikonur using Dnepr boosters.

Negotiations were held between the National Academy of Sciences of Belarus and Roscosmos over Belarus joining GLONASS.

In Belarus, space activities were the domain of the National Academy of Sciences of Belarus. The main space activities of the academy were:

- development of ERS spacecraft and advanced space technology and equipment;
- development of ground infrastructure for receiving, processing and distributing satellite data and spacecraft control;
- development and introduction of space information technology;
- development of a satellite communications system;
- development of a single geodetic, navigation and time system based on the national ERS system;
- space industry personnel training.

== Space Program ==
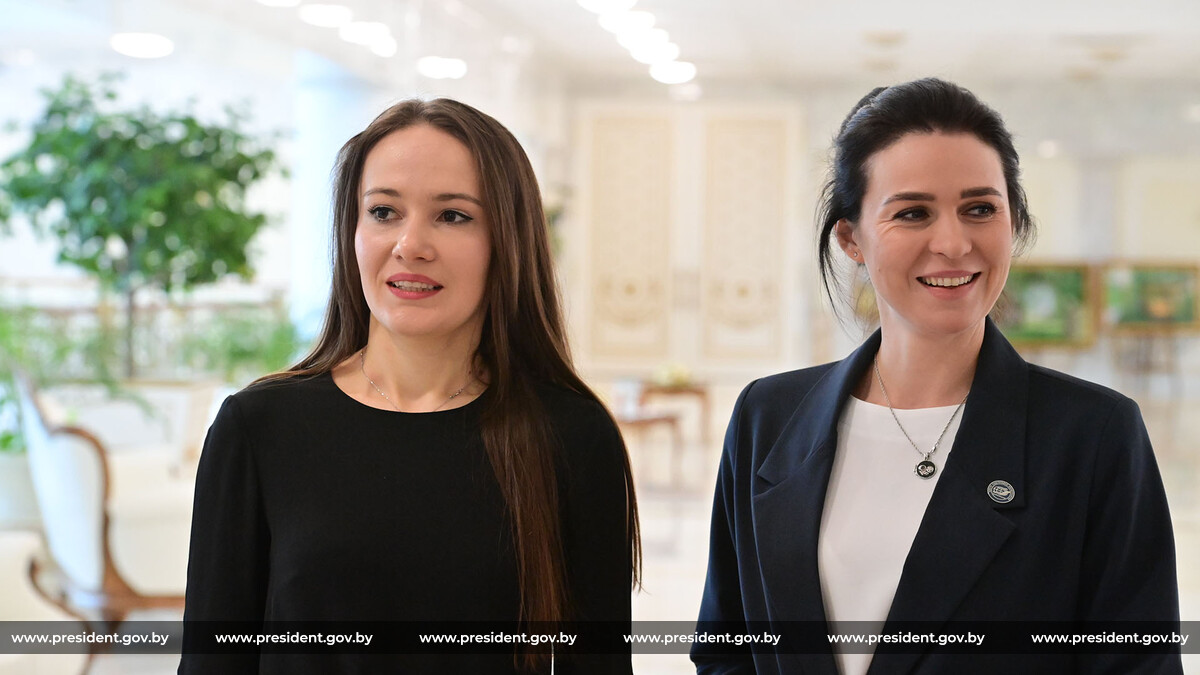
B.S.A. women cosmonauts, Anastasia Lenkova and Maryna Vasileuskaya, respective backup and main crew from the Soyuz MS-25.

Belarus plans to set up own Flight Control Center in the building of the United Institute of Informatics Problems in Minsk. Flight Control Center (CUP) will receive the information from the command-measuring post now constructed in Logoisk district.

In August 2012 Belarus invited China to expand the collaboration in space industry. President of the Republic of Belarus Alexander Lukashenko offered closer cooperation in the space industry to China, as he met with President of the China Aerospace Science and Technology Corporation (CASC) Ma Xingrui on 6. August 2012. The President of the China Aerospace Science and Technology Corporation Ma Xingrui also pointed to the high level of cooperation in the space industry between Belarus and China and praised the quality of Belarusian space equipment.

On December 16, 2011, during a seminar of government officials, President Alexander Lukashenko instructed the Belarusian scientists to construct the world's best spacecraft.

In August 2012 Belarus started its first remote Earth sensing system. The first space images pictured parts of Mozambique and Bahrain.

In October 2012 Russia and Belarus declared to start a space satellite group. Additionally both states want to open a center for space services in Minsk. The Director of the Space Strategy and Program Department of Roscosmos Yuri Makarov noted that Belarus and Russia might develop a joint small spacecraft for scientific and educational purposes to be used at universities of the two countries.

In August 2014 Piotr Vityaz, who is the Chief of Staff of the National Academy of Sciences of Belarus and leads the Belarus Space Agency, announced that Belarus is seeking a closer cooperation in space projects with Russia's Roscosmos Space Agency.

In August 2018, Belarusian Education Minister Igor Karpenko announced that China has won a tender to insert into orbit a satellite made by students of the Belarusian State University.

== See also ==
- List of government space agencies
