= Nikolai Chub =

Russian cosmonaut (born 1984)

- Николай Чуб
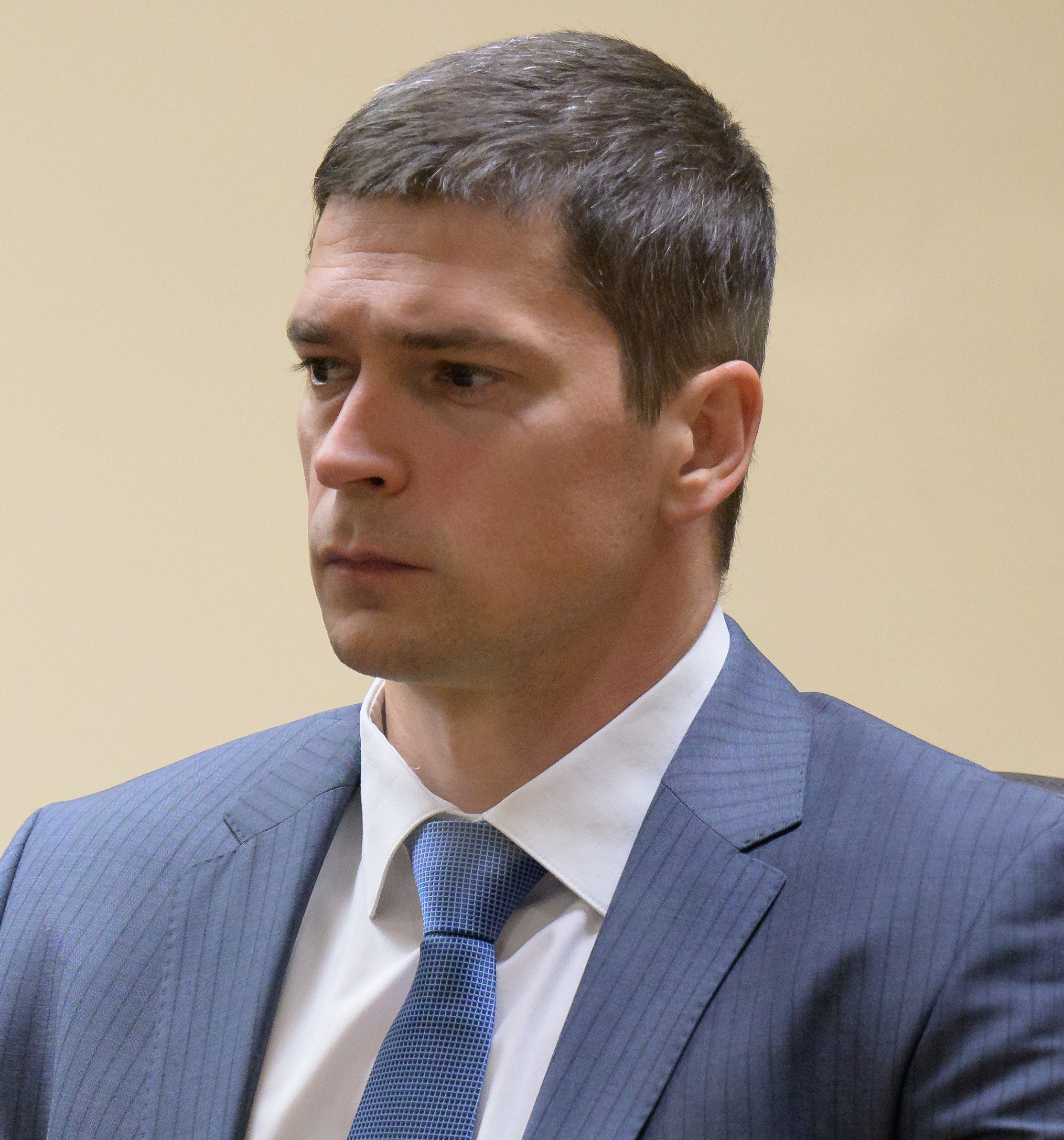
- Chub in 2022
- Born: Nikolay Aleksandrovich Chub; 10 June 1984 (age 42); Novocherkassk, Russian SFSR, USSR
- Space career

Roscosmos cosmonaut
- Current occupation: Test cosmonaut
- Previous occupation: Economist
- Status: Active
- Time in space: 373 days, 20 hours, 14 minutes
- Selection: TsPK 2012 Cosmonaut Group
- Total EVAs: 2
- Total EVA time: 12 hours, 17 minutes
- Missions: Soyuz MS-24/MS-25 (Expedition 69/70/71)
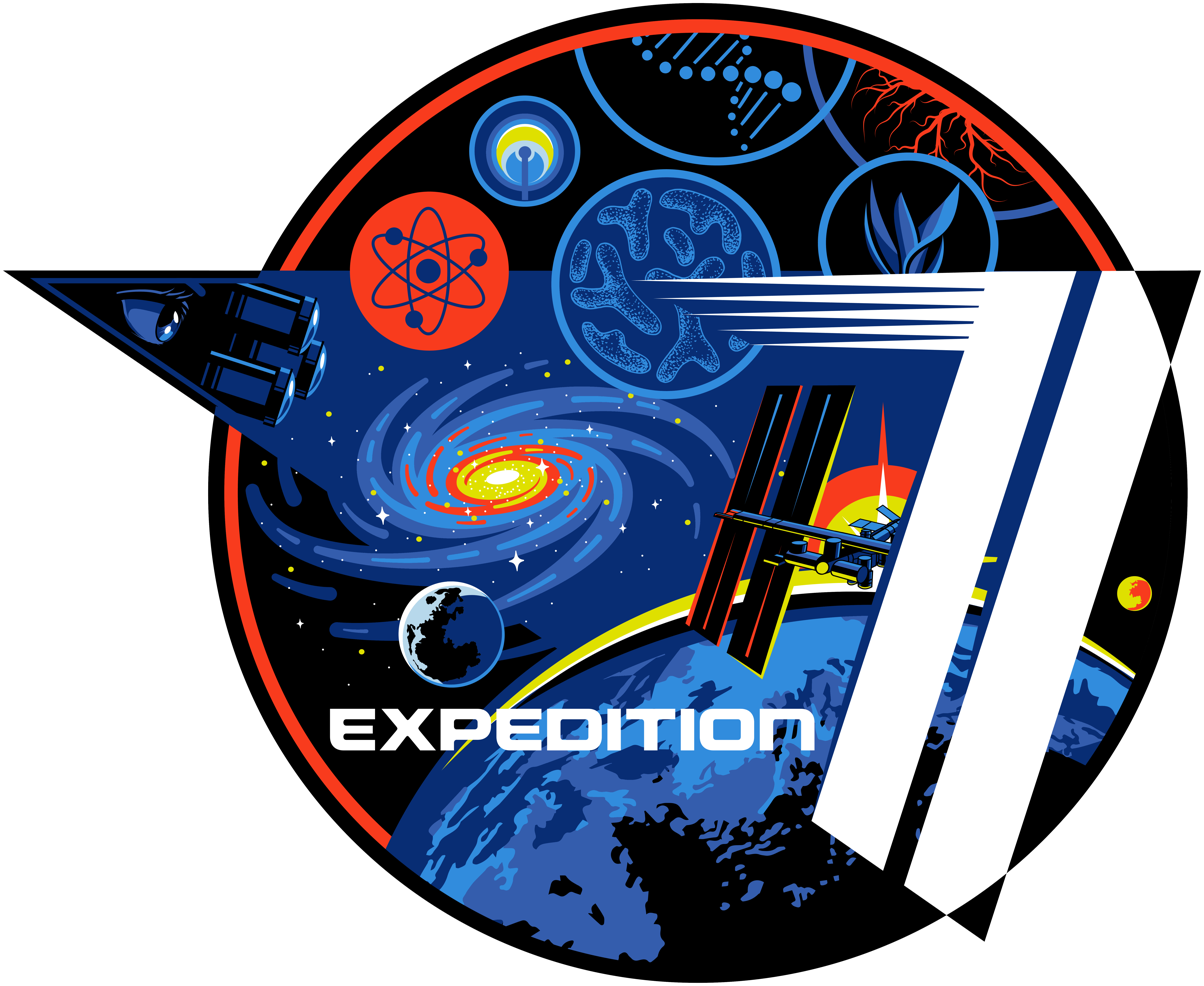
- Mission insignia

Nikolay Aleksandrovich Chub (Russian: Николай Александрович Чуб; born 10 June 1984) is a cosmonaut selected by the Roscosmos space agency in 2012.

== Biography ==
Prior to selection as a cosmonaut, Chub obtained a degree in management and informatics from the South-Russian State Technical University (Novocherkassk Polytechnic Institute) in 2006 as the top member of his class. He subsequently obtained a graduate degree in economics from the same institution.

Prior to his selection as a cosmonaut, Chub directed the astronautics firm Space Tu, LLC. He was selected as a cosmonaut candidate in 2012 and was named a test cosmonaut on June 16, 2014.

In 2019 Chub participated to the training ESA CAVES, organized by the European Space Agency, held between Italy and Slovenia.

Chub trained as a backup crewmember for the Soyuz MS-12 flight to the International Space Station, and in accordance with his Roscosmos biography, had been selected as a crewmember for the Soyuz MS-17 mission, but was subsequently replaced by American astronaut Kathleen Rubins.

In January 2022 Chub was denied without explanation a visa to the United States to visit the Johnson Space Center and to hold a five-week session there to get acquainted with the American segment of the ISS. Roscosmos considered that the decision of the American side threatens the safety of the astronaut on the ISS. After the publication of this information, a visa for a trip to the United States was issued to Chub a few days later.

Chub was again assigned as a backup crew member for Soyuz MS-22, and then flew on MS-24. He returned on Soyuz MS-25 after a year long mission in space.
