= Loral O'Hara =

US astronaut (born 1983)

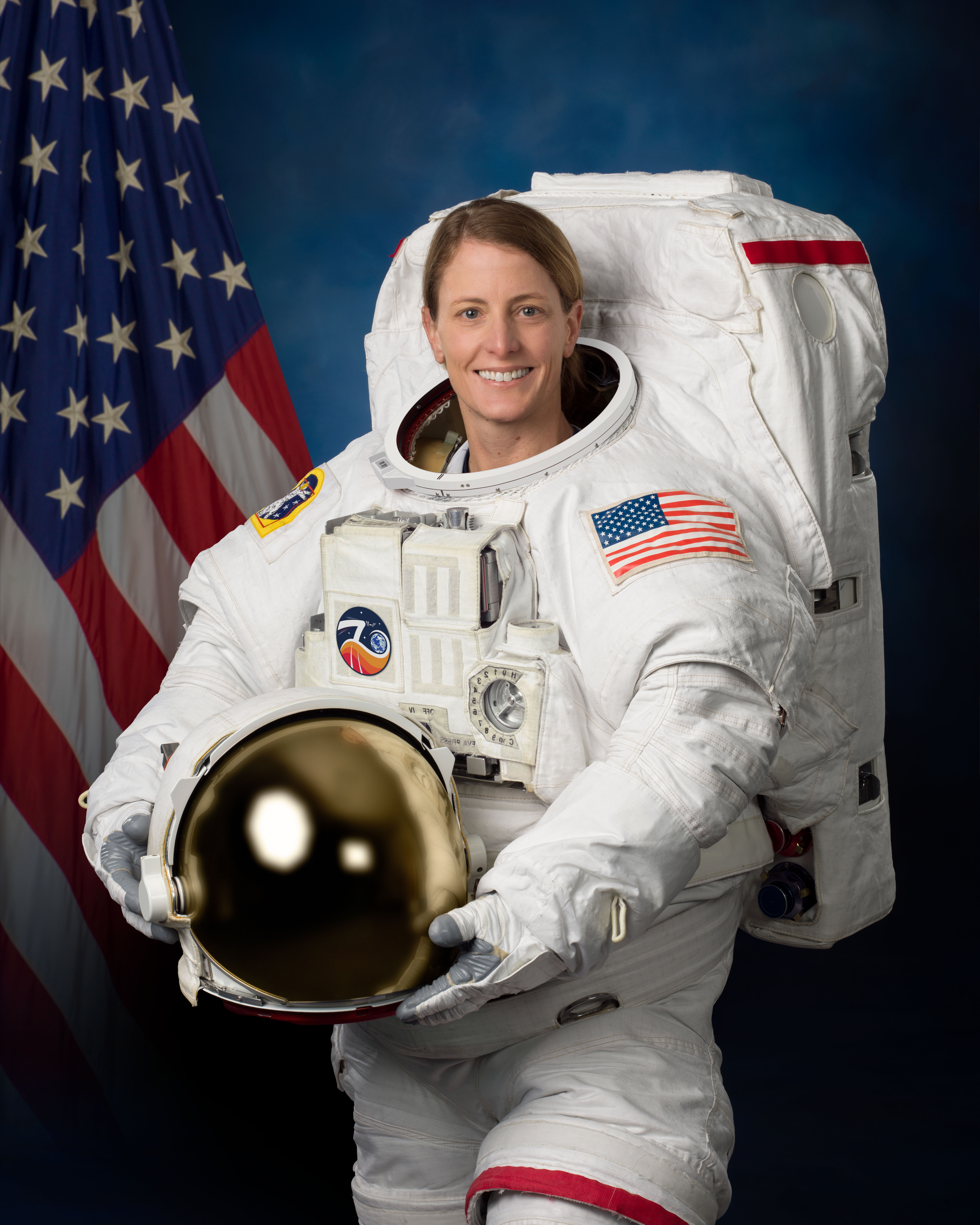
- NASA portrait, 2023
- Born: Loral Ashley O'Hara; May 3, 1983 (age 43); Houston, Texas, U.S.
- Education: University of Kansas (BS); Purdue University (MS)
- Space career

NASA astronaut
- Time in space: 203 days, 15 hours and 33 minutes
- Selection: NASA Group 22 (2017)
- Total EVAs: 1
- Total EVA time: 6h 43m
- Missions: Soyuz MS-24 (Expedition 69/70)

Loral Ashley O'Hara (born May 3, 1983) is an American engineer and NASA astronaut.

== Early life and education ==
Loral Ashley O'Hara was born on May 3, 1983, in Houston, Texas, to Cindy and Steve O'Hara. She grew up in Sugar Land, Texas, where she attended Clements High School. She earned a Bachelor of Science degree in aerospace engineering from the University of Kansas in 2005, and a Master of Science in aeronautics and astronautics from Purdue University in 2009. While she was a student at KU, O'Hara participated in the KC-135 Reduced Gravity Student Flight Opportunities Program.

== Engineering career ==
Prior to completing her Master of Science degree, O'Hara worked for Rocketplane Limited in Oklahoma City, Oklahoma. In 2009, O'Hara began working at the Woods Hole Oceanographic Institution. She has participated in upgrades to the submersible DSV Alvin, and has worked as an engineer and data processor for the remotely-operated vehicle Jason.

== NASA career ==
O'Hara has previously participated in the NASA Academy at Goddard Space Flight Center, and completed an internship at the Jet Propulsion Laboratory. In June 2017, she was selected as an astronaut candidate, and began training in August. On January 10, 2020, she graduated from NASA's astronaut candidate program to its astronaut corps, and became eligible for spaceflight.

On July 15, 2022, NASA announced she would fly on board Soyuz MS-23 as part of Expedition 68. However, following the on-orbit problems with the Soyuz MS-22 spacecraft that necessitated repurposing of the Soyuz MS-23 spacecraft, O'Hara's crew shifted to Soyuz MS-24.

O'Hara launched aboard Soyuz MS-24 on September 15, 2023 and returned on April 6, 2024.

== Personal life ==
O'Hara is a private pilot, certified emergency medical technician, and a wilderness first responder. She enjoys traveling, whitewater rafting, surfing, diving, flying, sailing, skiing, hiking, caving, reading, and painting.

== Awards and honors ==
In 2008, O'Hara was awarded a National Science Foundation Graduate Research Fellowship. In 2015, she was an invited speaker at TEDx New Bedford.
