= Hazza Al Mansouri =

Emirati astronaut (born 1983)

Hazzaa Al Mansoori
- هزاع المنصوري
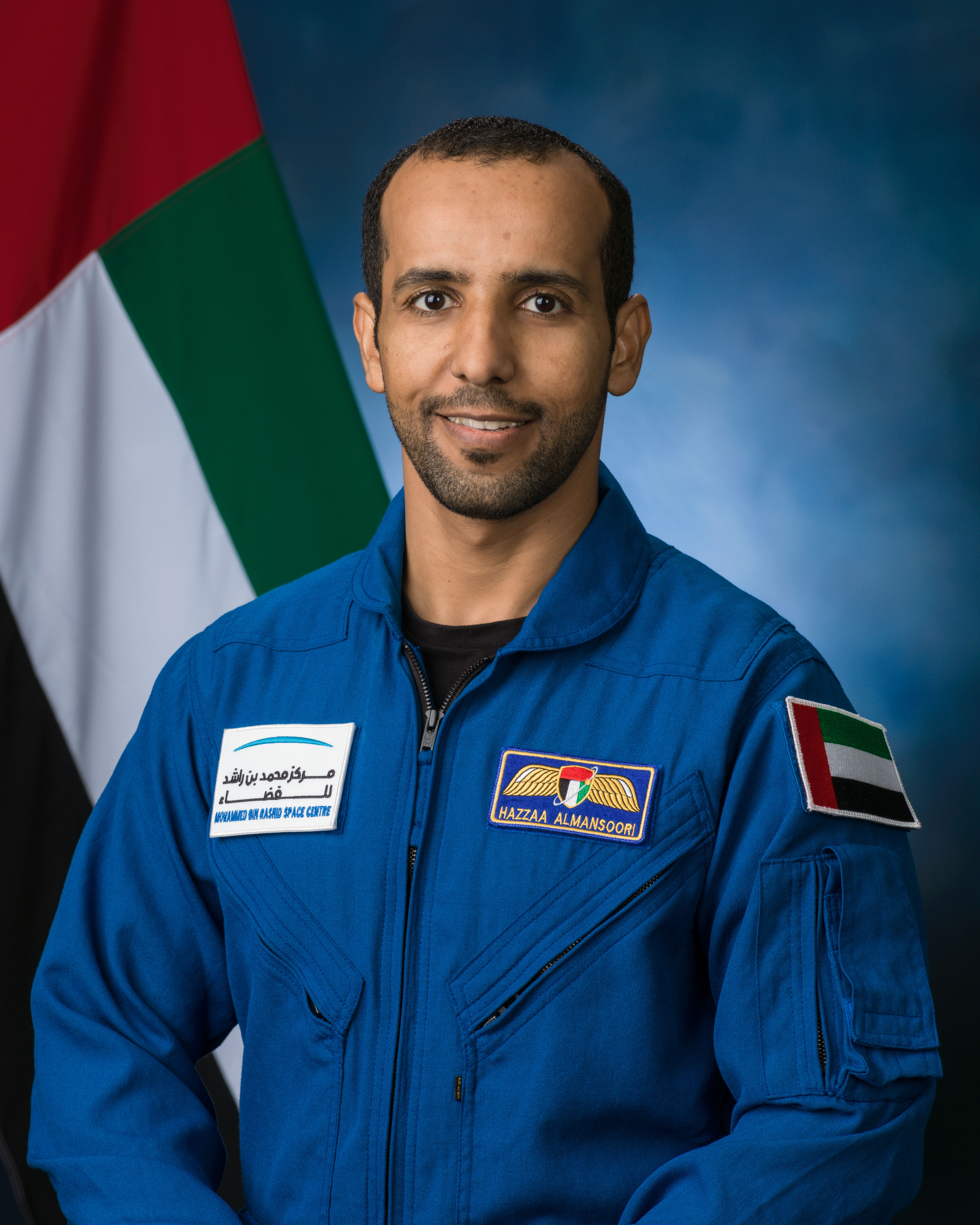
- Al Mansoori in 2022
- Born: 13 December 1983 (age 42); Al Wathba, United Arab Emirates
- Other names: Hazzaa Ali Abdan Khalfan AlMansoori هَزَّاع عَلِي عَبْدان خَلْفَان ٱلْمَنْصُوْرِي
- Education: Khalifa bin Zayed Air College
- Space career

MBRSC astronaut
- Current occupation: Fighter pilot, astronaut
- Time in space: 7 days, 21 hours,1 minute
- Selection: MBRSC Group 1 (2018)
- Missions: Soyuz MS-15/MS-12 (19th Visiting Expedition)

Hazzaa Al Mansoori (Arabic: هَزَّاع ٱلْمَنْصُوْرِي, romanized: Hazzāʿ Al-Manṣūrī, surname also spelled "Al Mansoori", full name Hazzaa Ali Abdan Khalfan Al Mansoori (هَزَّاع عَلِي عَبْدان خَلْفَان ٱلْمَنْصُوْرِي) is an Emirati astronaut and the first person from the United Arab Emirates in space. In 2019, he embarked on the UAE's first scientific mission to the International Space Station (ISS). The mission carried the slogan 'Zayed's Ambition', making the UAE the 19th country worldwide, and the first in the Arab region, whose astronauts traveled to the ISS. He also became the back-up astronaut for Sultan Al Neyadi for the UAE's second mission to the ISS, which is the longest Arab space mission. Previously, he was the UAE's youngest F-16 fighter pilot.

On 25 September 2019, he launched aboard the Soyuz MS-15 spacecraft to the ISS, where he stayed for eight days. He landed safely in Kazakhstan, on 3 October 2019 aboard Soyuz MS-12, completing the United Arab Emirates first astronaut mission.

== Early life, education, and military career ==
Al Mansoori was born on 13 December 1983 in the Abu Dhabi suburb of Al Wathba moved with his family to Al-Dhafra in western Abu Dhabi. In his childhood, Hazzaa loved exploring and watching stars and meteors on dark nights in the desert of Liwa where he spent most of his childhood. He dreamed of being a pilot and loved to read about airplanes and space trips.

After graduating from Al Seddique High School in Liwa, Al Dhafra region, his passion for astronomy led him to study aviation at the Khalifa bin Zayed Air College. After graduating in 2004, he joined the armed forces and later became one of the most outstanding military pilots. His excellence enabled him to become one of the top candidates to become a Functional Check Flight (FCF) Pilot F-16B60.

He travelled to Arizona, USA, to train on this aircraft for three years, and then returned to the UAE to complete his training. Four years after his return, Al Mansoori became the youngest military pilot on the F-16. He also qualified to be a pilot for flight testing and aircraft assessment and was one of the first Arab and Emirati pilots to take part in the Dubai Air Show's 50th anniversary of UAE Force. He also presented a show at the UAE National Day in 2017, and the 50th anniversary of UAE Air Force in 2018.

== The UAE Astronaut Programme ==
On 6 December 2017, UAE Vice-President and Prime Minister Sheikh Mohammed bin Rashid Al Maktoum wrote on his Twitter account, "I invite young Emiratis to register for the UAE Astronaut Programme through the Mohammed bin Rashid Space Centre". Al Mansoori was one of the first selected astronauts in the first batch of the UAE Astronaut Programme, launched by Sheikh Mohammed bin Rashid Al Maktoum, Vice President and Prime Minister of the UAE and Ruler of Dubai, and Sheikh Mohammed bin Zayed Al Nahyan, Crown Prince of Abu Dhabi and Deputy Supreme Commander of the UAE Armed forces, in 2017. The Programme aims to train and prepare a team of Emirati astronauts and send them to space for various scientific missions.

Al Mansoori was selected from 4,022 candidates, following a series of mental and physical tests in the UAE and abroad. His military background played a huge role in his excellence in physical fitness, which he had previously undergone in the UAE and abroad, to qualify to become an F-16B60 instructor pilot and a demo pilot, SOLO Demonstration pilot in F-16B60. He took on a number of training courses such as the water survival course, GYRO LAP Course up to 9G's, Spatial Disorientation course, and the RED Flag Exercise in US, Las Vegas.

== Astronaut career ==
On 3 September 2018, Sheikh Mohammed tweeted: "We announced today our first astronauts to the International Space Station: Hazzaa Al Mansoori and Sultan Al Nayadi. Hazzaa and Sultan represent all young Arabs and represent the pinnacle of the UAE's ambitions".

As part of the agreement between Mohammed bin Rashid Space Centre (MBRSC) and Russian space agency Roscosmos to train Emirati astronauts, Al Mansoori went through training at Yuri Gagarin Cosmonaut Training Center in Star City, Russia in preparation for the ISS mission. He also received training in Houston in Texas, and Cologne in Germany, as part of partnership agreements with major space agencies, including NASA, ESA, and JAXA.

April 2019, the Mohammed bin Rashid Space Centre (MBRSC) announced that it had selected Al Mansoori as the prime astronaut for an eight-day mission to the International Space Station (ISS). Al Mansoori was assigned to Soyuz MS-15, alongside Russian commander Oleg Skripochka and American flight engineer Jessica Meir, both of whom would remain aboard the ISS for 204 days as part of Expedition 61/62. Unlike Skripochka and Meir, Al Mansoori would land eight days after launch aboard Soyuz MS-12, alongside Russian commander Aleksey Ovchinin and American flight engineer Nick Hague, who would be returning following a 203-day stay on the ISS as part of Expedition 59/60.

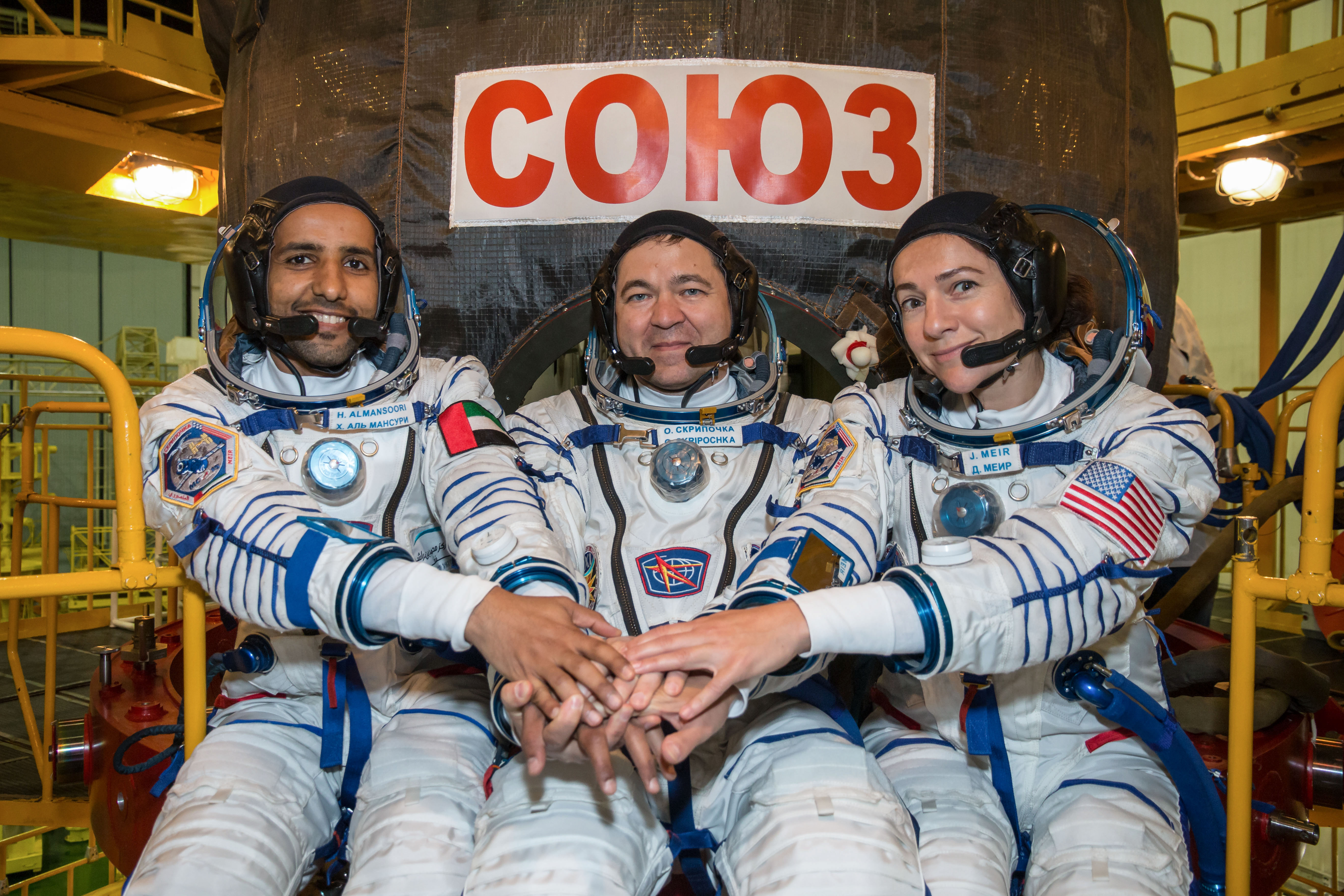
Al Mansoori (left) alongside Soyuz MS-15 commander Oleg Skripochka (centre) and flight engineer Jessica Meir (right)

Al Mansoori, Skripocka, and Meir launched on 25 September 2019 from the Baikonur Cosmodrome; the trio spent under six hours free flying in space before docking to the Zvezda module on the ISS. Originally the spacecraft was scheduled to dock to the Poisk module, but Soyuz MS-13 had moved there a month earlier to allow for the uncrewed Soyuz MS-14 spacecraft to dock to the Zvezda module for a short period of time. Following docking the hatches between Soyuz MS-15 and Zvezda were opened, allowing Al Mansoori, Skripochka and Meir to travel inside and meet their six crew mates.

The training programme for the ISS mission included comprehensive training on all sections and units of the ISS and how to use its devices and equipment, emergency fire drills, dealing with low pressure and ammonia leak inside the station, in addition to survival training if the capsule had to land in a cold forest.

Al Mansoori was also trained on the spacesuit, weighing up to 10 kgs and how to wear at zero gravity. He also trained to perform daily tasks such as preparing food, how to use the camera to document events, taking pictures of the Earth, communicating with the ground stations, and other day-to-day tasks during the mission. Al Mansoori underwent more than 90 courses, with the total number of training hours exceeding 1,400 hours.

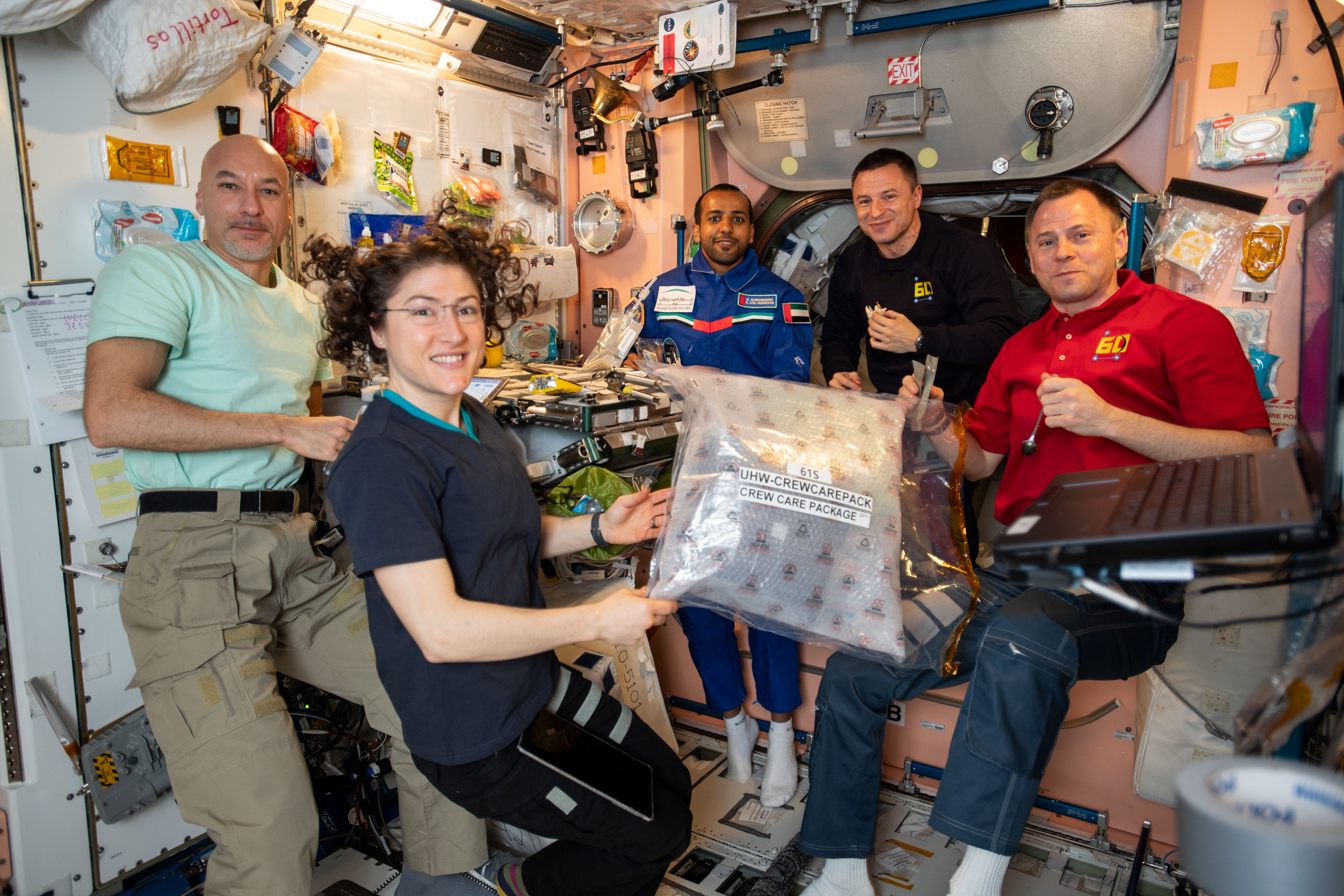
Expedition 60 crew with Al Mansoori inside the Unity module for a meal

Due to the "direct handover" that was needed to facilitate Al Mansoori's short duration mission, his mission occurred during an unusual time when nine people were aboard the ISS, the three crew members who had launched on Soyuz MS-12, Aleksey Ovchinin, Nick Hague and Christina Koch, the three who had launched on Soyuz MS-13, Aleksandr Skvortsov, Luca Parmitano and Andrew Morgan, and the three who had launched aboard Soyuz MS-15. During his short stay aboard the ISS, Al Mansoori conducted 15 experiments created by UAE school students and selected under an MBRSC "Science in space" competition, conducted Earth observation experiments, filmed the first ever tour of the ISS in Arabic and became the first Middle eastern person to be studied following time in microgravity.

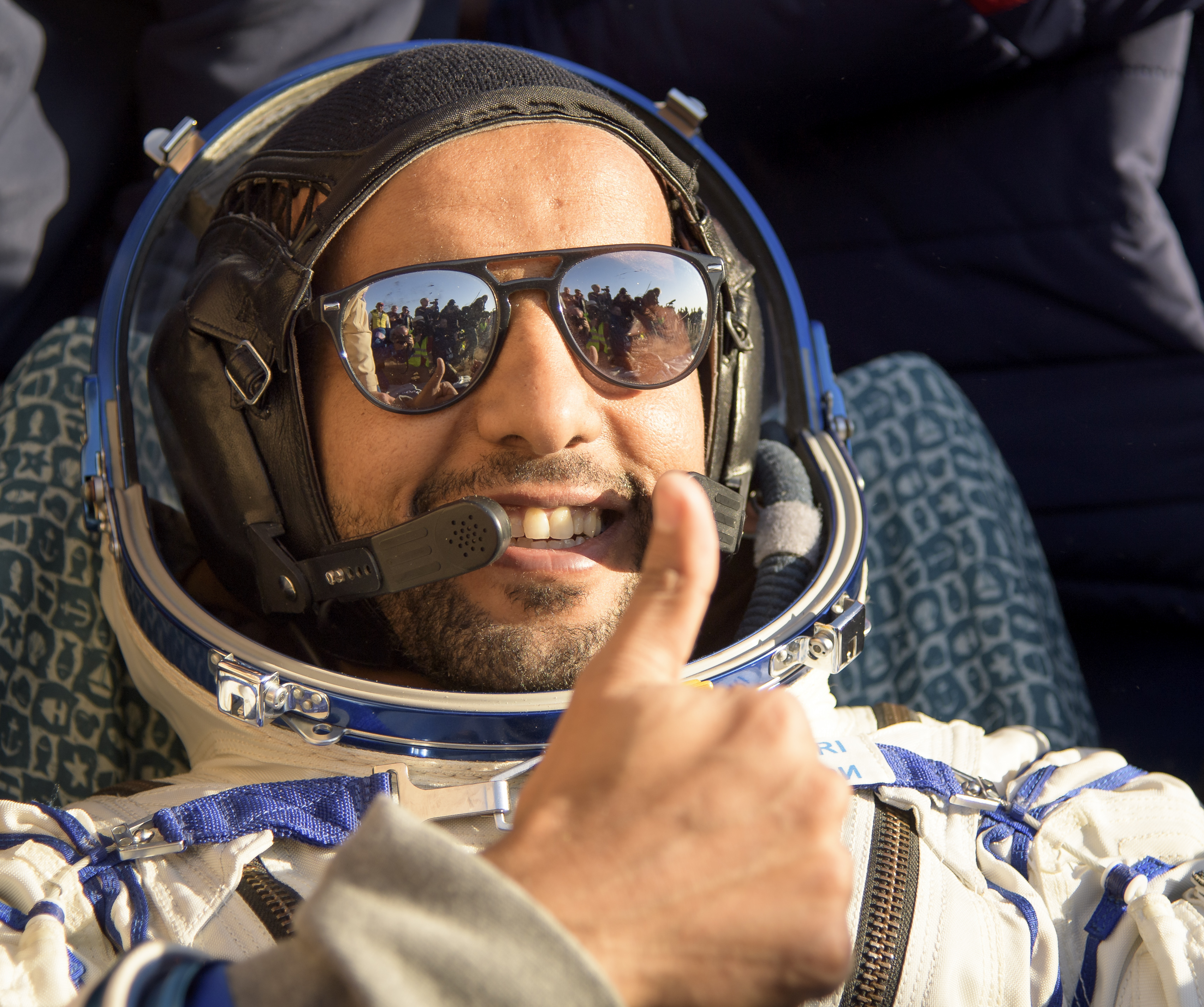
Al Mansoori following the landing of Soyuz MS-12.

On 3 October 2019, Al Mansoori, Ovchinin and Hague boarded the Soyuz MS-12 spacecraft, and undocked from the ISS, ending Expedition 60 and officially beginning Expedition 61, the three spent around five hours free flying in space before de-orbiting and touching down on the Kazakh Steppe, following which Ovchinin and Al Mansoori were flown to Star City, Russia, before Al Mansoori began his journey back to the UAE.

Al Mansoori further successfully completed his first year of training at NASA's Johnson Space Center in 2021 and is currently ready to work as an operator onboard the International Space Station.

He trained in the Neutral Buoyancy Laboratory (NBL), passed evaluations which included using the Extravehicular Mobility Unit (EMU), maintenance of the International Space Station, the Incapacitated Crew Rescue (ICR), and completed theoretical and practical training sessions on the T-38 jet. In 2022, he was selected by The Karman Project as a Karman Fellow for his work in space.

=== Terminology ===
Flying through an agreement between the UAE and Russian governments, Hazzaa's role aboard the Soyuz and the ISS is referred to as a spaceflight participant (Russian: uchastnik kosmicheskovo poleta) in Roscosmos and NASA documents and press briefings. NASA has updated the terminology post the return of the mission to Earth on 3 October 2019, and referred to Hazzaa as a visiting astronaut. The Mohammed bin Rashid Space Centre refers to his mission as "UAE Astronaut Mission 1" or "Zayed's Ambition".

== See also ==
- Media related to Hazza Al Mansouri (astronaut) at Wikimedia Commons
- Timeline of space travel by nationality
- Sultan Al Neyadi
- UAE Space Agency
