= NASA Astronaut Group 21 =

2013 human spaceflight selection of 8 candidates; "The Eight Balls"

The 8 Balls
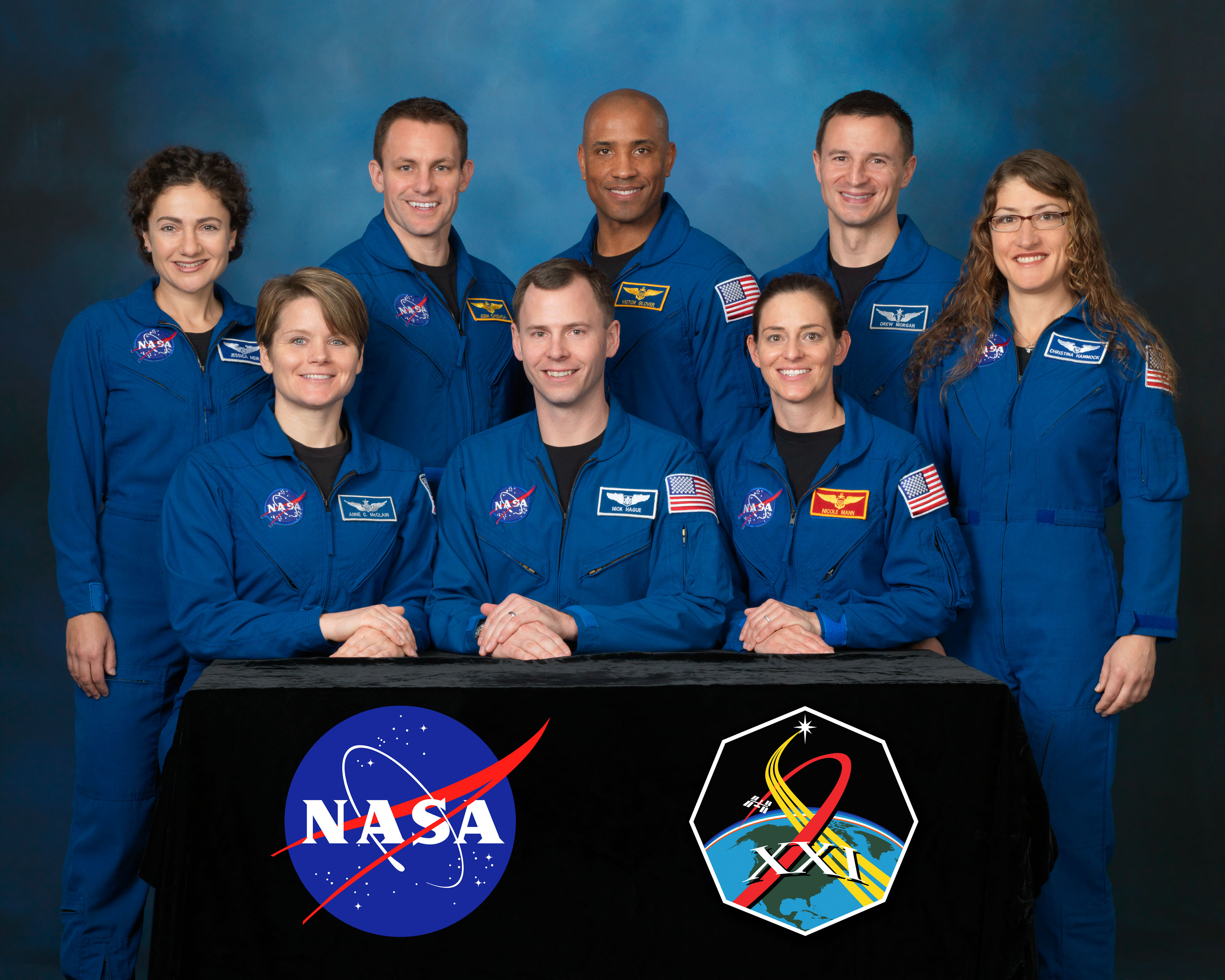
- Group 21 astronauts. Back row, L-R: Meir, Cassada, Glover, Morgan and Koch. Front row, L-R: McClain, Hague and Mann
- Year selected: 2013
- Number selected: 8

In 2011, NASA opened applications for Astronaut Group 21 (nicknamed "The Eight Balls"). The team was announced in June 2013 after a year and a half long search. With four men and four women, the class of 2013 had the highest percentage of female finalists. According to NASA astronaut Kathleen Rubins, "it's… a reflection of how many really talented women are in science and engineering these days." NASA received a total of over 6,300 applications, which made it the second highest number received at the time (the class of 2017 surpassed both records with a total of more than 18,300).

Traditionally, the upcoming class is given a nickname by the previous class. Following this custom, the class of 2009 (also known as "The Chumps") christened the 2013 class the "Eight Balls" in reference to there being eight of them. Bob Behnken, then Chief of the Astronaut Office, stated in an interview that the name further represents that, "The eight ball [in billiards or pool] is played last and the hope from the preceding class is that the [2013 astronaut candidates] will be assigned after all of them [fly]." The team consists of eight people, Jessica Meir, Major Nicole Mann, Lt. Commander Josh Cassada, Lt. Colonel Nick Hague, Christina Koch, Major Andrew Morgan, Lt. Commander Victor Glover, and Lt. Colonel Anne McClain.

All eight members of the group have flown in space as of October 2022. Five placed on the list of then-longest spaceflights for NASA astronauts, with Koch holding the record for the longest single spaceflight for a woman since 2019. In 2019, Meir and Koch became the first women to participate in an all-female spacewalk. With the Artemis II lunar flyby in 2026, Glover and Koch became the first person of color and the first woman respectively to travel beyond low Earth orbit and to the Moon's vicinity.

== History ==
On April 9, 1959, the National Aeronautics and Space Administration (NASA) announced the finalists for Astronaut Group 1. This group of seven astronauts, also sometimes known as the "Original Seven" or the "Mercury Seven" were a part of the first human spaceflight program, called Project Mercury. Since the original group, the total number of astronaut groups has grown to 22 as of 2017. The Group 21 class joined 47 other active NASA astronauts.

== Selection and training ==
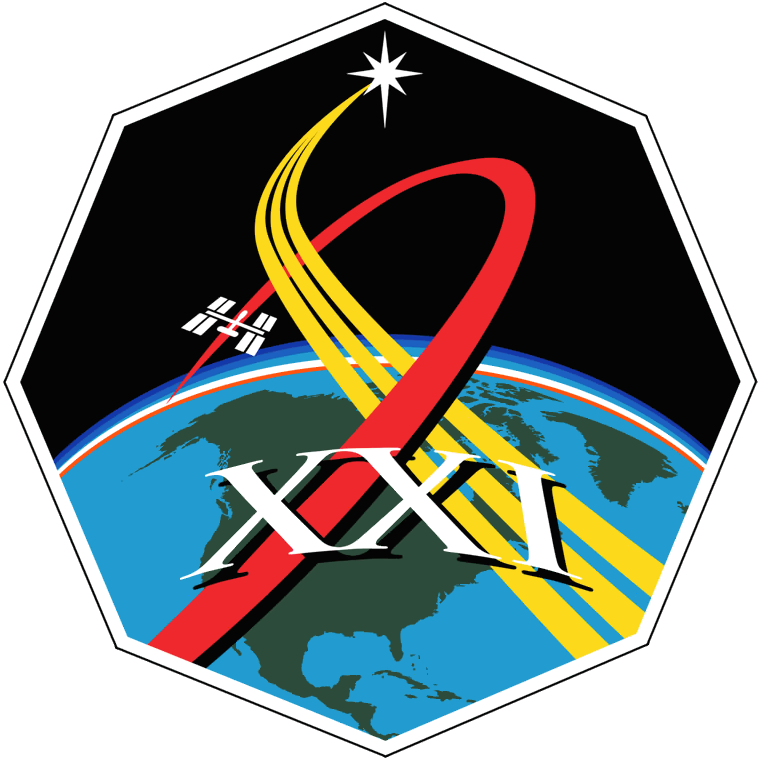
Group patch

A requirement for selection to the astronaut program is to have United States citizenship and a degree in science, engineering or math. In addition, three years of professional experience for non-pilots and at least 1000 hours of jet flight time for pilots is required. Community service is an advantage. Lastly, applicants must be able to pass the NASA flight physical. The selection process takes approximately 18 months.

Astronaut candidates go through two years of training. They study engineering, Earth and space science, meteorology and space station systems. They also undergo strenuous survival training including scuba certification and swim test qualifications. After this stage, the astronauts who are selected to continue work with senior astronauts who mentor them in furthering their training. In the final training period, the astronauts focus on the specific requirements for their mission.

== Group members ==
- Josh A. Cassada (1 flight), born 18 July 1973 in San Diego, California; retired 1 October 2024
  - Pilot – SpaceX Crew-5 (Expedition 68) – 5 October 2022
- Victor Glover (2 flights), born 30 April 1976 in Pomona, California; retired 9 September 2026 (emeritus status)
  - Pilot – SpaceX Crew-1 (Expedition 64/65) – 16 November 2020
  - Pilot – Artemis II – 1 April 2026
- Nick Hague (2 flights), born 24 September 1975 in Belleville, Kansas; retired 23 December 2025
  - Flight engineer – Soyuz MS-10 (Expedition 57/58) – 11 October 2018 (aborted suborbital flight)
  - Flight engineer – Soyuz MS-12 (Expedition 59/60) – 14 March 2019
  - Commander – SpaceX Crew-9 (Expedition 72) – 28 September 2024
- Christina Koch (2 flights), born 29 January 1979 in Grand Rapids, Michigan; transitioned to management status on 1 November 2026
  - Flight engineer – Soyuz MS-12/Soyuz MS-13 (Expedition 59/60/61) – 14 March 2019
  - Mission specialist – Artemis II – 1 April 2026
- Nicole Aunapu Mann (1 flight), born 27 June 1977 in Petaluma, California
  - Commander – SpaceX Crew-5 (Expedition 68) – 5 October 2022
- Anne McClain (2 flights), born 7 June 1979 in Spokane, Washington
  - Flight engineer – Soyuz MS-11 (Expedition 57/58/59) – 3 December 2018
  - Commander – SpaceX Crew-10 (Expedition 72/73) – 14 March 2025
- Jessica Meir (2 flights), born 1 July 1977 in Caribou, Maine
  - Flight engineer – Soyuz MS-15 (Expedition 61/62) – 25 September 2019
  - Commander – SpaceX Crew-12 (Expedition 74/75) – 13 February 2026
- Andrew R. Morgan (1 flight), born 5 February 1976 in Morgantown, West Virginia; retired 28 May 2026
  - Flight engineer – Soyuz MS-13/Soyuz MS-15 (Expedition 60/61/62) – 20 July 2019

== Mission ==
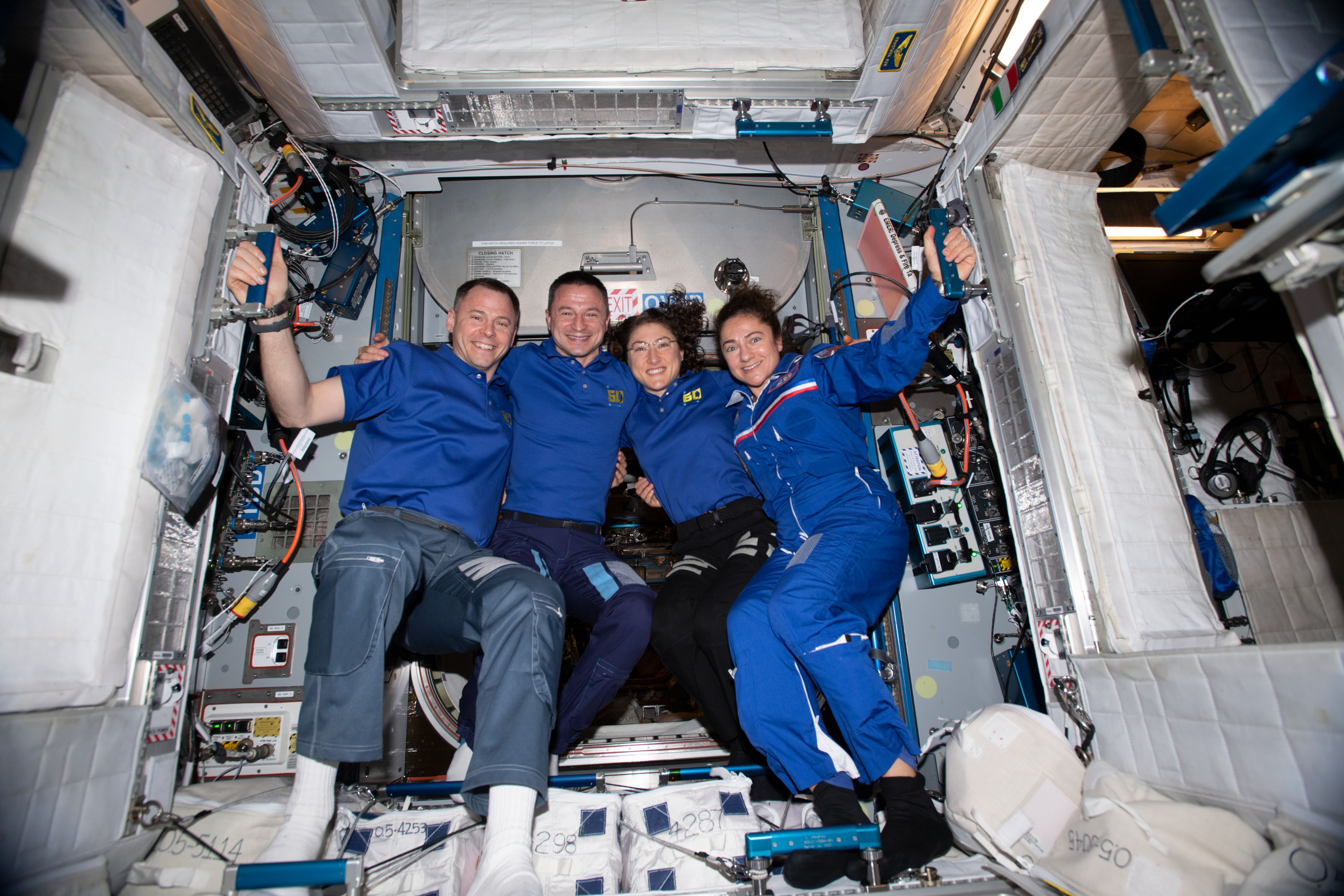
Nick Hague, Andrew Morgan, Christina Koch, and Jessica Meir inside ISS, 25 September 2019.

The 2013 class was originally thought to be the "first who will be trained for exploration beyond Earth orbit since the Apollo years". Their first goal was to have been to visit a near-earth asteroid in 2020 as preparation for an eventual mission to Mars. Current NASA goals do not include an asteroid mission. Artemis II, the first crewed mission beyond Earth orbit since Apollo, ultimately took place in 2026. Two members of the group, Christina Koch and Victor Glover, were crew members of this mission.

All eight members of the group have completed their training and have flown or are currently flying. Five were assigned to Soyuz expeditions to the International Space Station (ISS) with Hague as the first of the class to be assigned to fly aboard Expedition 57/58 in November 2018, his flight being aborted during launch. McClain was on 58/59, Hammock Koch and Hague (on his reflight) on 59/60, Morgan on 60/61, and Meir on 61/62. Three other members were assigned to the Commercial Crew cadre for flights to the ISS: Mann was assigned to Boe-CFT and Cassada on CTS-1, both aboard Boeing's Starliner, and Glover was assigned to SpaceX's Dragon 2. Glover flew on SpaceX Crew-1, and Mann and Cassada were subsequently reassigned to Crew Dragon due to delays to Boeing Starliner entering service. Both flew on SpaceX Crew-5.

== See also ==
- NASA Astronaut Group 22
- List of astronauts by year of selection
