= Andrew R. Morgan =

American astronaut

Drew Morgan
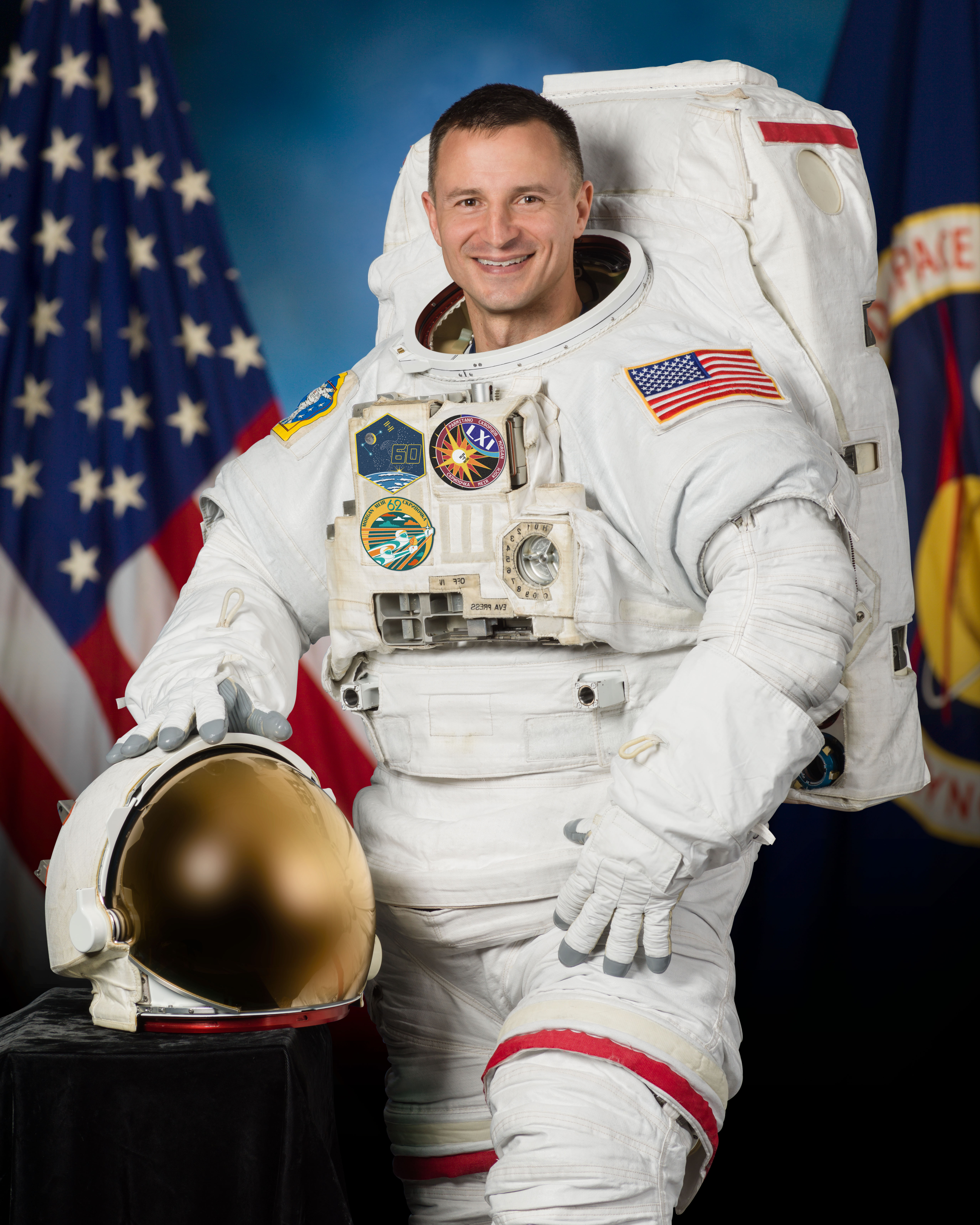
- Born: Andrew Richard Morgan; February 5, 1976 (age 50); Morgantown, West Virginia, U.S.
- Education: United States Military Academy (BS); Uniformed Services University of the Health Sciences (MD)
- Space career

NASA astronaut
- Rank: Brigadier General, U.S. Army
- Time in space: 271 days, 12 hours 48 minutes
- Selection: NASA Group 21 (2013)
- Total EVAs: 7
- Total EVA time: 45 hours, 48 minutes
- Missions: Soyuz MS-13/Soyuz MS-15 (Expedition 60/61/62)
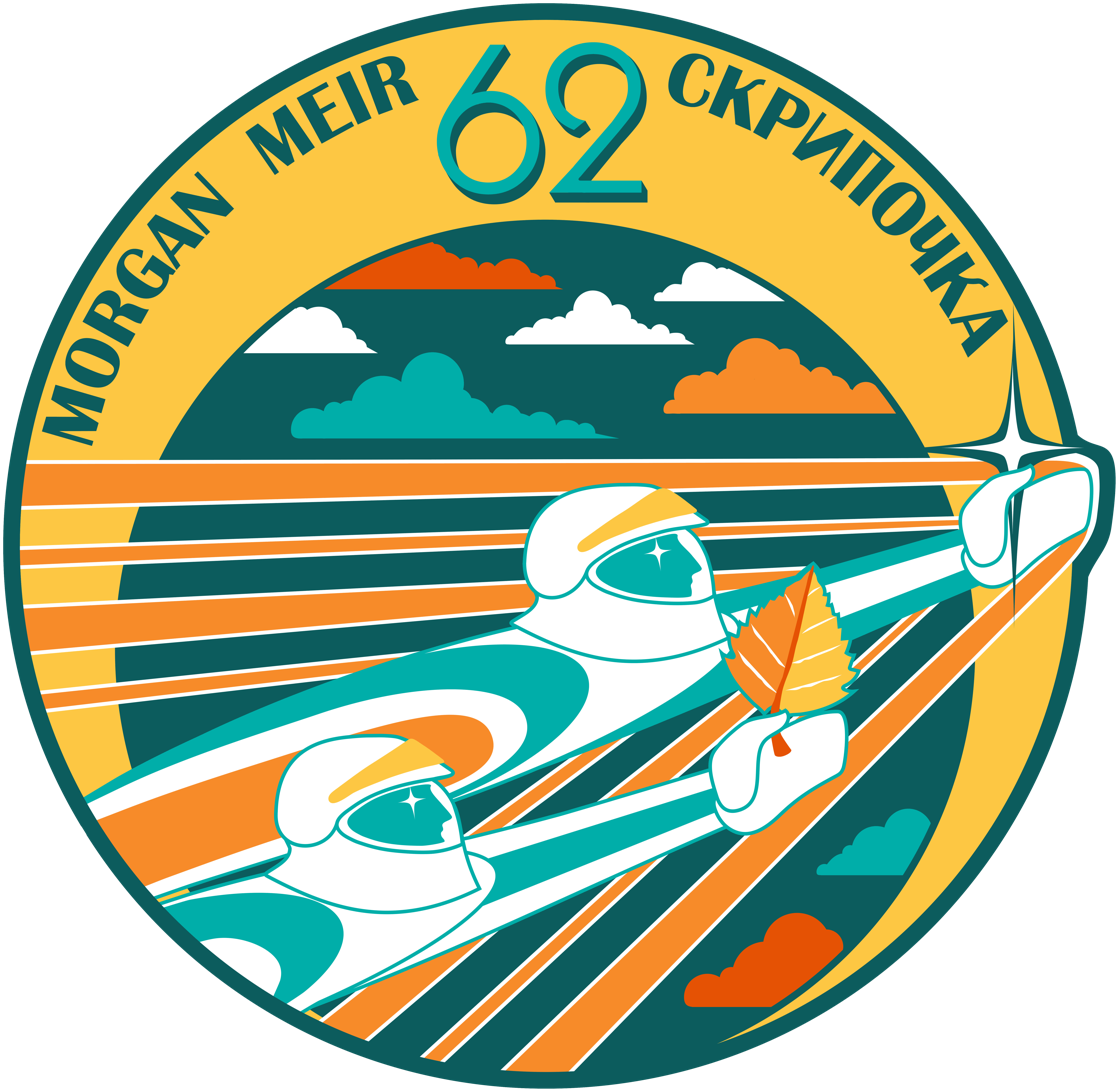
- Mission insignia
- Retired: May 28, 2026

Andrew Richard Morgan (born February 5, 1976) is an American military physician and retired NASA astronaut from the class of 2013.

== Personal life ==
Andrew is married to Stacey Morgan; they have four children.

== Early life and education ==
Morgan was born in Morgantown, West Virginia on February 5, 1976 to Richard and Janice Morgan. He attended Dover High School in Delaware, graduating in 1994 before completing a Bachelor of Science in Environmental Engineering at the West Point US Military Academy in 1998. Morgan was then commissioned into the US Army. During his time at West Point, he was part of the West Point Parachute Team, known as the "Black Knights". He later attended medical school at the Uniformed Services University of the Health Sciences, where he earned his MD. In 2005, he completed his residency in emergency medicine at the Madigan Army Medical Center near Tacoma, Washington. In 2013, he completed a fellowship in primary care sports medicine at Virginia Commonwealth University.

== US Army career ==
Following Morgan's graduation from West Point in 1998, he commissioned into the US Army as a medical officer. He completed his medical training and then volunteered for the US Army Special Operations Command. He was assigned as a physician at Fort Bragg and worked as a medical team member in the Special Operations Command as well as being part of the US Army Parachute Team as a physician. As part of the special operations command, he deployed to Iraq, Afghanistan, and Africa before being given a strategic special operations assignment in Washington, D.C. He was preparing to move to an Army base in Germany for a tour of duty before his selection by NASA in 2013.

From June 2023 to May 2025, Morgan served as the garrison commander for Kwajalein Atoll. He was succeeded in this role in late May 2025 by Col. Matthew Cannon. As of June 2025, he is currently the senior commander at White Sands Missile Range.

== Astronaut career ==
Morgan was selected by NASA in June 2013 as one of the eight members of NASA Astronaut Group 21 (nicknamed "The Eight Balls") and began two years of astronaut basic training, which included training in Russian language, robotics, scientific and technical fields, ISS operations, T-38 flight operations, survival operations, and spacewalk operations. Morgan, along with his seven classmates, graduated from astronaut training and became eligible for future flight assignments on July 7, 2015.

In between completion of his training and assignment to his first flight, Morgan served in NASA EVA/Robotics and Crew Operations branches.

Since his return from his first mission, Morgan served as the Mission Support Branch Chief of the NASA Astronaut Office and Increment Lead for Expedition 67.

In July 2023, Morgan was sworn in as Commander of U.S. Army Garrison-Kwajalein Atoll (USAG-KA) for a two-year tour of duty. He relinquished command to Col. Matthew Cannon on 4 June 2025.

=== Expedition 60/61/62 ===
Morgan was initially assigned to fly a six-month mission to the ISS as flight engineer on Soyuz MS-13 and Expedition 60 and 61. Although, in April 2019, due to several factors including the aborted launch of Soyuz MS-10 in October 2018, Morgan and fellow astronaut Christina Koch's flight's were extended, Morgan's landing was moved from Soyuz MS-13 to Soyuz MS-15, extending his flight to Expedition 62.

Morgan launched into space on board Soyuz MS-13 on July 20, 2019, joining the ISS Expedition 60, 61 and 62 crew as a flight engineer, alongside Roscosmos cosmonaut Aleksandr Skvortsov and Italian ESA astronaut Luca Parmitano. Just six hours later the trio rendezvoused with the ISS, joining the Expedition 60 crew alongside Russian commander Aleksey Ovchinin and American flight engineers Nick Hague and Christina Koch.

On August 21, 2019, Morgan conducted his first spacewalk alongside Hague. The two spent six hours and 32 minutes outside of the ISS installing the International Docking Adapter-3 (IDA-3) docking adapter onto the Pressurized Mating Adapter-3 (PMA-3) docking part, attached to the ISS's Harmony module, the installation of this adapter converted PMA-3 from the older APAS-95 docking system, used by the Space Shuttle, to the newer International Docking System Standard, which will allow the port to be used by the SpaceX Crew Dragon and Boeing CST-100 Starliner spacecraft being developed to ferry crew to the ISS under the Commercial Crew Program.

Over the course of Expedition 61, Morgan participated in six more spacewalks, two alongside Christina Koch, replacing batteries on the station's port truss segments, and four alongside Luca Parmitano, repairing the Alpha Magnetic Spectrometer particle physics experiment, located on the outside of the ISS, both of them were assisted by NASA astronauts Christina Koch and Jessica Meir who operated the Canadarm2 robotic arm from inside the Station. The spacewalks were described as the "most challenging since Hubble repairs".

In November 2019, he cast a ballot from outer space in that year's Pennsylvania elections. During Expedition 62, Morgan was present on the ISS for the arrival and departure of SpaceX CRS-20, the final flight of SpaceX's Cargo Dragon robotic resupply spacecraft before its replacement by Cargo Dragon 2.

On April 9, during the final days of Expedition 62, the crew were joined by the three crew members of Soyuz MS-16, Russian cosmonauts Anatoli Ivanishin and Ivan Vagner, as well as NASA astronaut Christopher Cassidy. Following the arrival of Soyuz MS-16, Expedition 62 spent eight days as a six-person increment. During this period, Morgan participated in a segment of Some Good News, an internet show hosted by American actor John Krasinski to spread good news during the 2020 COVID-19 pandemic. On April 17, 2020, Morgan, alongside NASA astronaut Jessica Meir and Russian cosmonaut Oleg Skripochka returned to Earth aboard Soyuz MS-15, ending a 272-day spaceflight for Morgan, the fourth-longest single spaceflight for an American astronaut. On January 6, 2022, Mark T. Vande Hei and Pyotr Dubrov completed 273 days on ISS, surpassing Morgan's record of 272 days on board.

On May 28, 2026, NASA announced Morgan’s retirement from the agency.

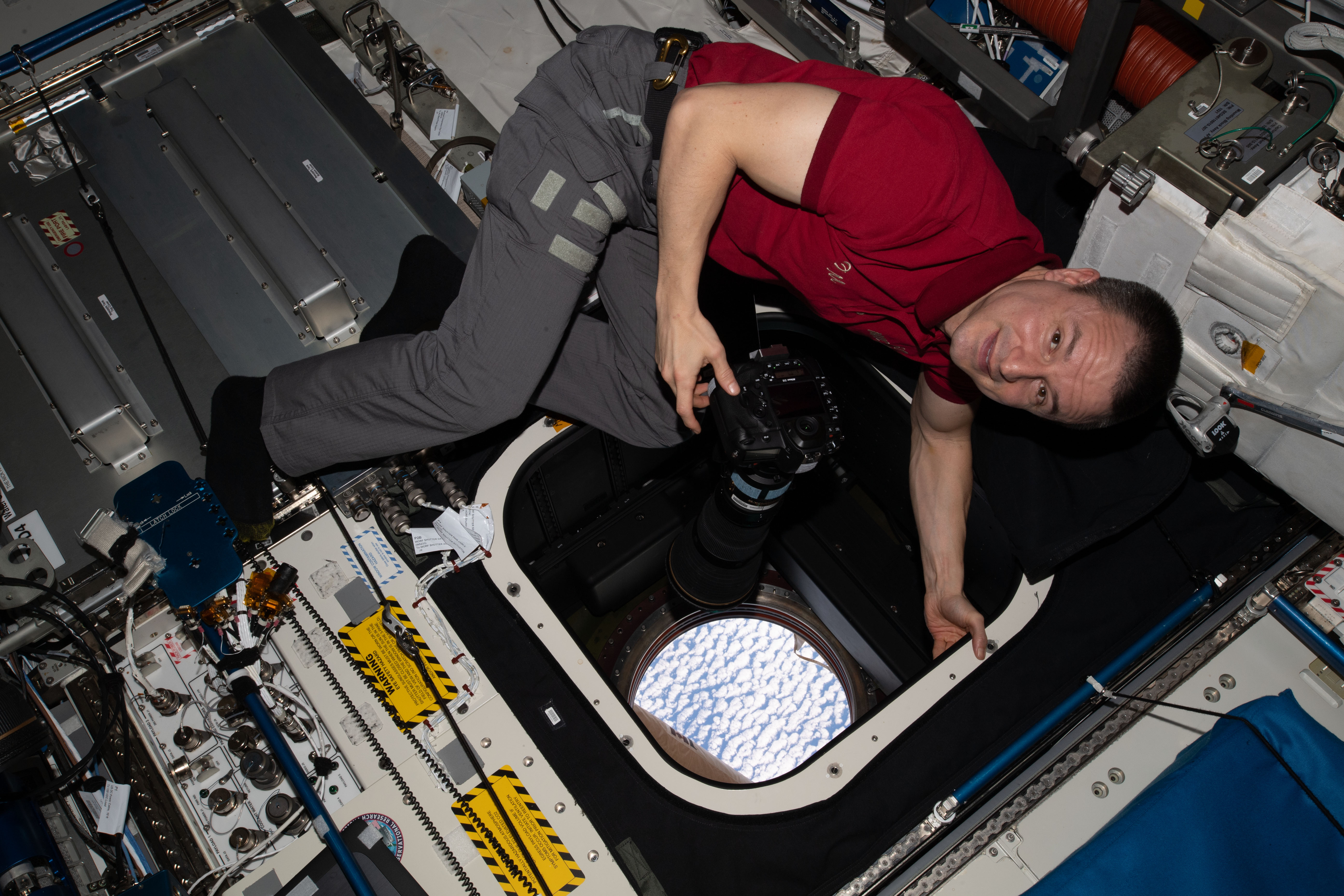
Morgan takes photographs of the Earth from the WORF

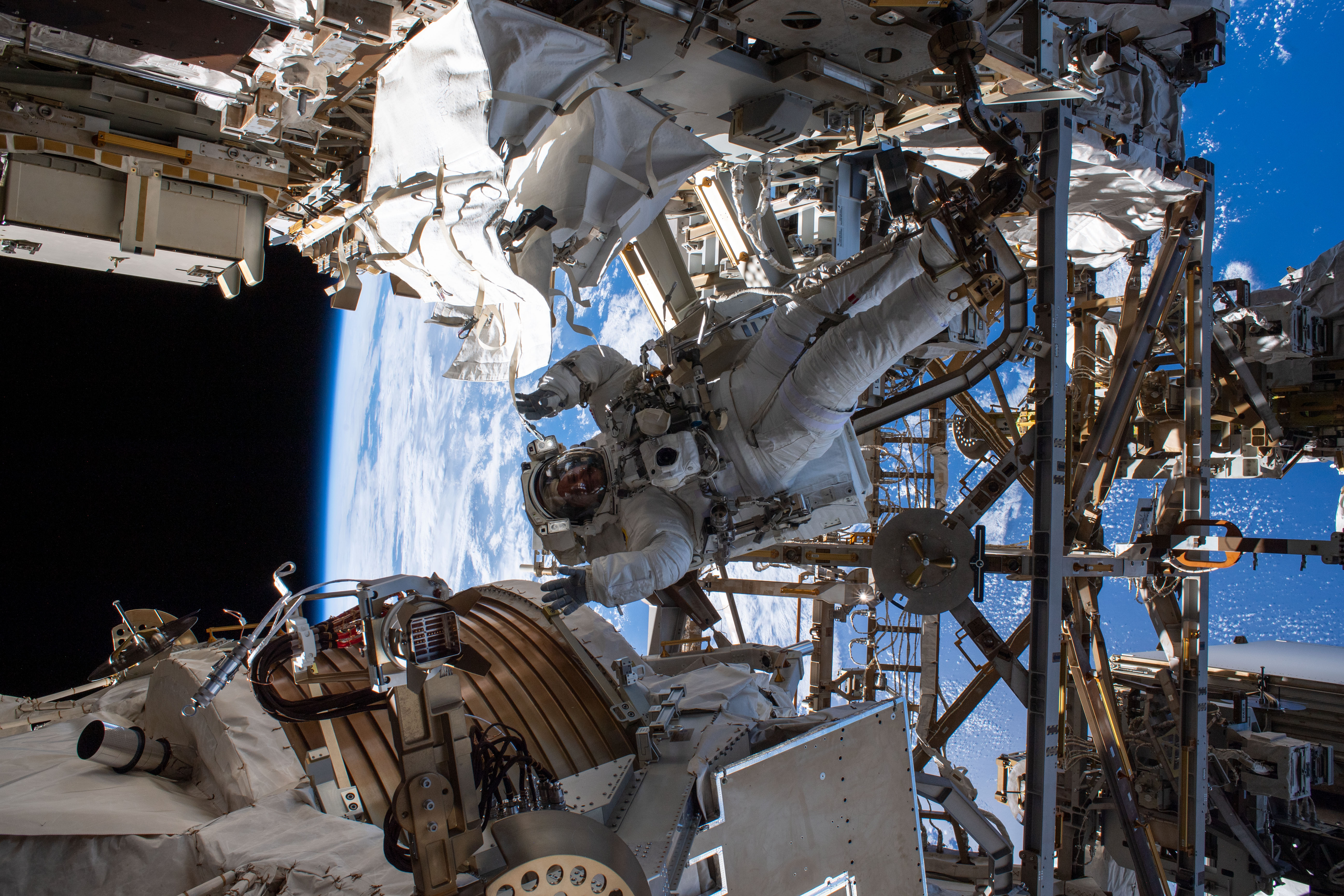
Andrew Morgan during the repair of AMS

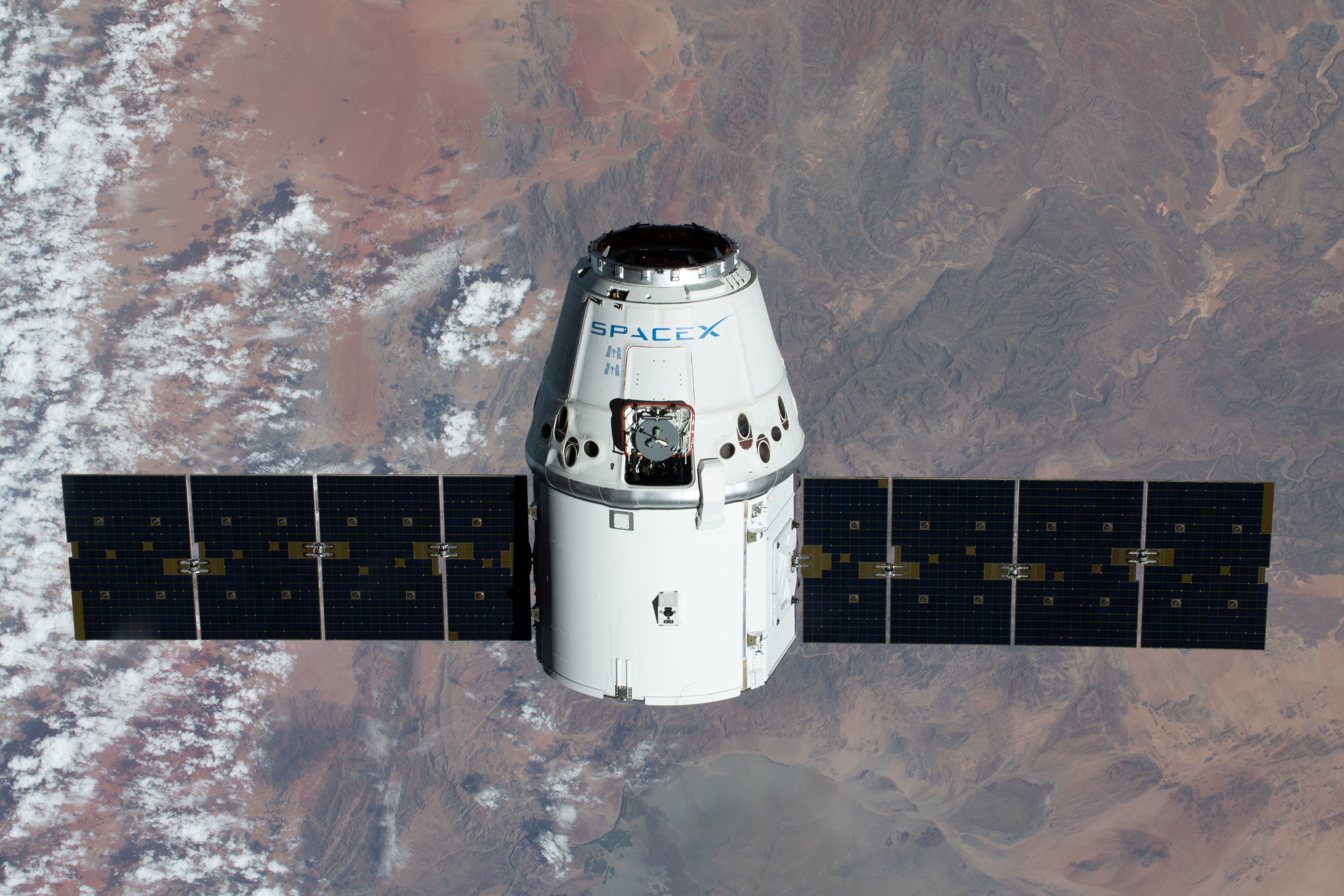
CRS-20 approaching the ISS

== Gallery ==
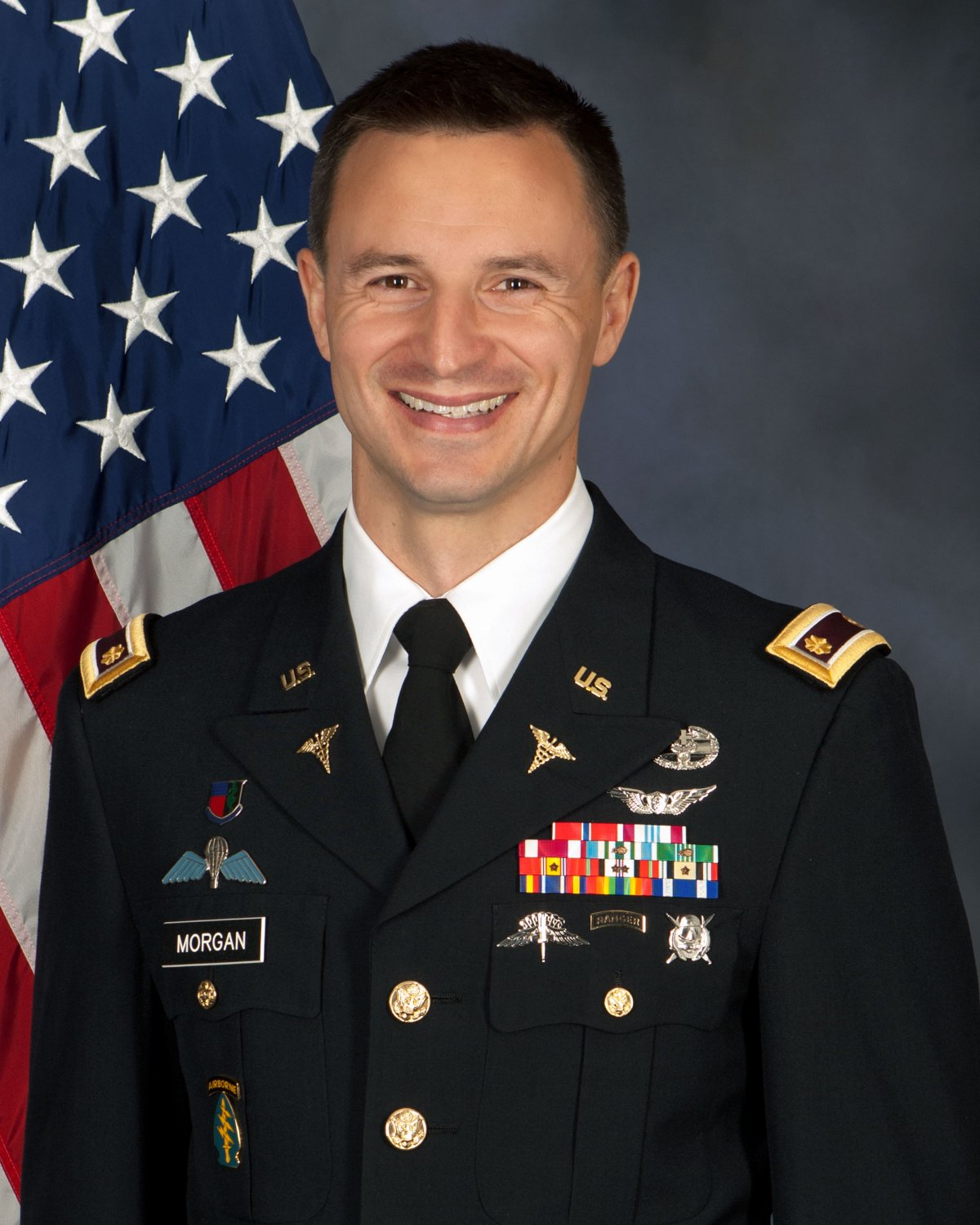
Major Morgan, 2013

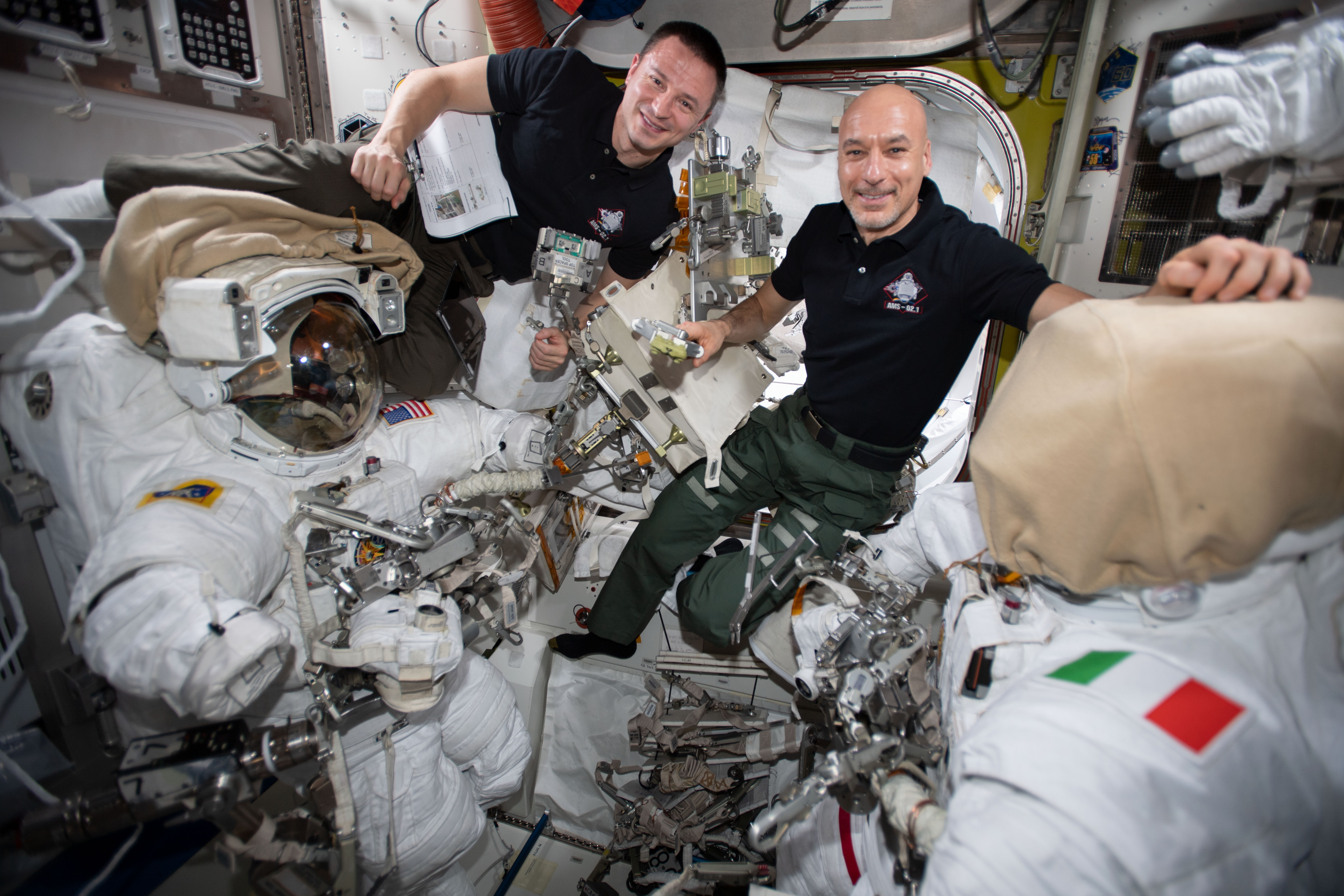
Morgan and ESA commander Luca Parmitano checking U.S. spacesuits and spacewalking tools
