= Expedition 60 =

Long-duration mission to the International Space Station

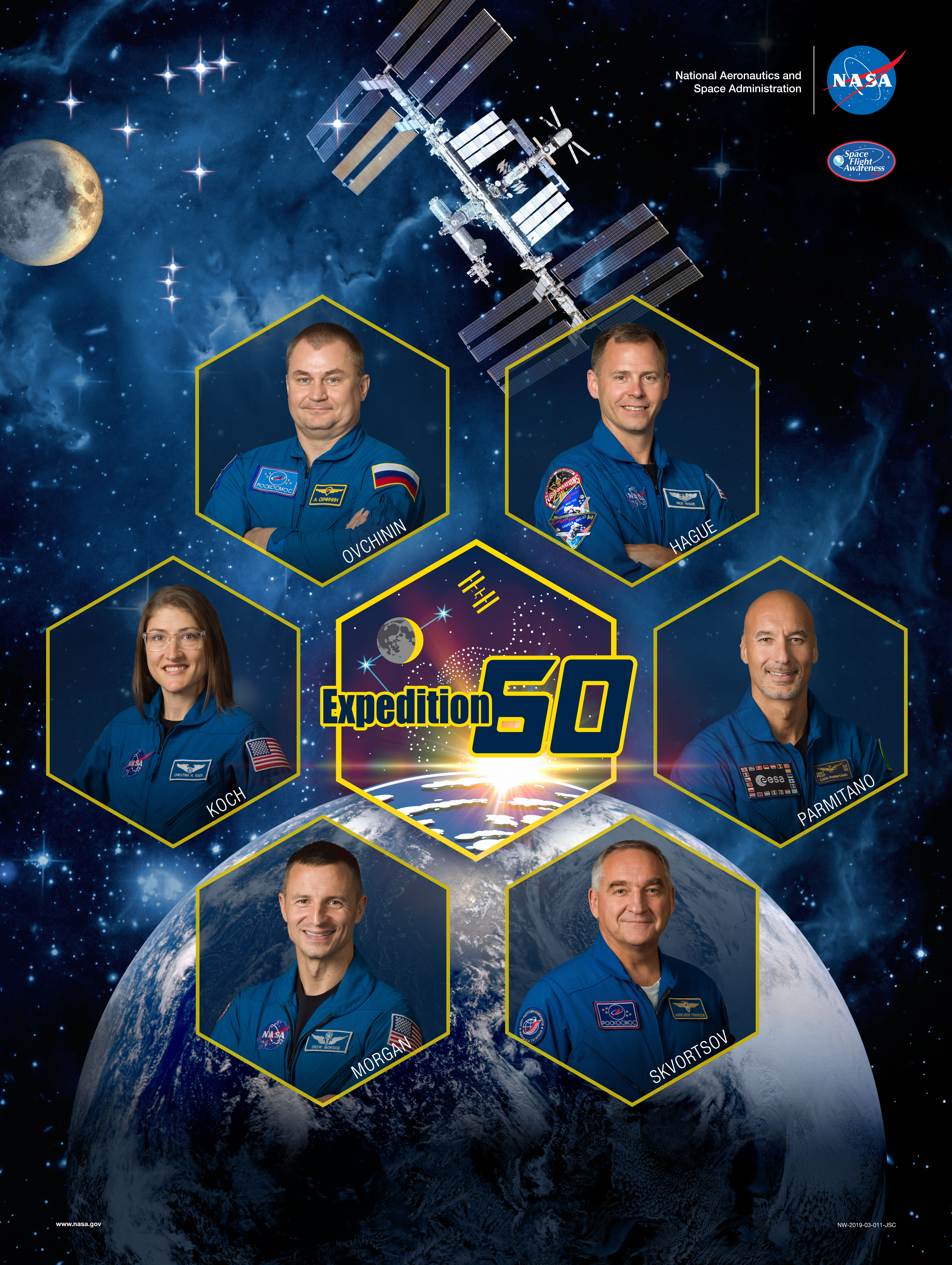
- Mission type: Long-duration expedition
- Mission duration: 100 days, 8 hours, 11 minutes
- Orbits completed: 3,248

Expedition
- Space station: International Space Station
- Began: 24 June 2019, 23:25:33 UTC
- Ended: 3 October 2019, 07:37:32 UTC
- Arrived aboard: Soyuz MS-12; Soyuz MS-13
- Departed aboard: Soyuz MS-12; Soyuz MS-13; Soyuz MS-15

Crew
- Crew size: 6
- Members: Expedition 59/60; Aleksey Ovchinin; Nick Hague; Expedition 59/60/61: Christina Koch; Expedition 60/61: Aleksandr Skvortsov; Luca Parmitano; Expedition 60/61/62: Andrew R. Morgan
- EVAs: 1
- EVA duration: 6 hours, 32 minutes
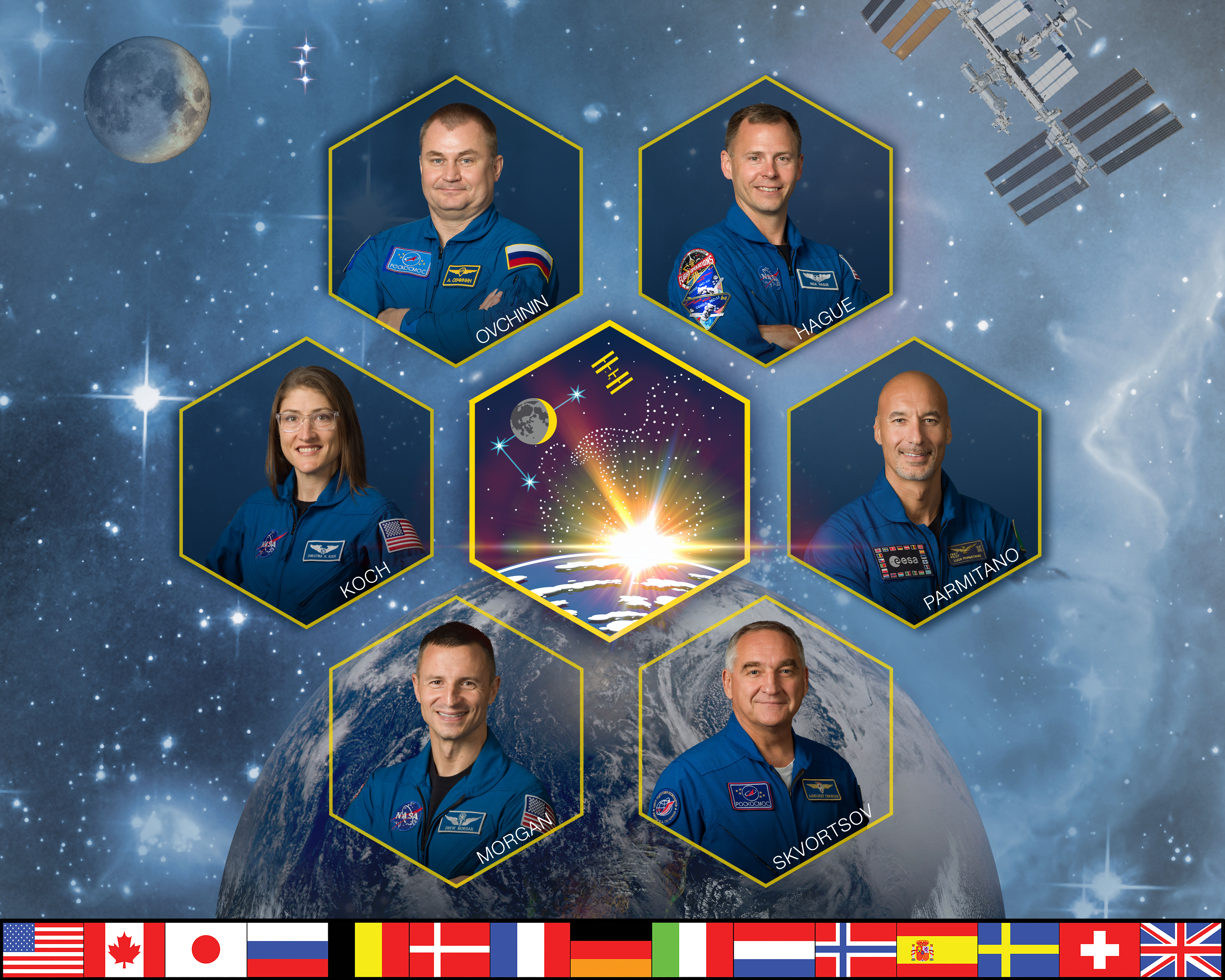
- Promotional Poster Clockwise from top left: Ovchinin, Hague, Parmitano, Skvortsov, Morgan and Koch ISS expeditions

Expedition 60 was the 60th Expedition to the International Space Station, which began on 24 June 2019 with the undocking of the Soyuz MS-11 spacecraft. The expedition was commanded by Aleksey Ovchinin, who transferred from Expedition 59 together with American flight engineers Nick Hague and Christina Koch. They were joined by Aleksandr Skvortsov, Luca Parmitano and Andrew Morgan, who arrived on Soyuz MS-13 on 20 July 2019. The expedition ended on 3 October 2019, when Soyuz MS-12 (carrying Ovchinin, Hague, and spaceflight participant Hazza Al Mansouri) undocked from the station and Koch, Skvortsov, Parmitano and Morgan transferred to Expedition 61.

During this expedition's final days, the station residents totaled 9 individuals temporarily upon the arrival of Soyuz MS-15, where for the first time since the departure of Soyuz TMA-16M in September 2015, the ISS crew exceeded the standard six.

== Crew ==
Position	First part (24 June – 20 July 2019)	Second part (20 July – 3 October 2019)
Commander	Aleksey Ovchinin, Roscosmos; Second (Note: Not counting the aborted flight of Soyuz MS-10) spaceflight	
Flight engineer	Nick Hague, NASA; First spaceflight	
Flight engineer	Christina Koch, NASA; First spaceflight	
Flight engineer	Off Station	Aleksandr Skvortsov, Roscosmos; Third and last spaceflight
Flight engineer	Off Station	Luca Parmitano, ESA; Second spaceflight
Flight engineer	Off Station	Andrew R. Morgan, NASA; Only spaceflight
