= Soyuz MS-15 =

2019 Russian crewed spaceflight to the ISS

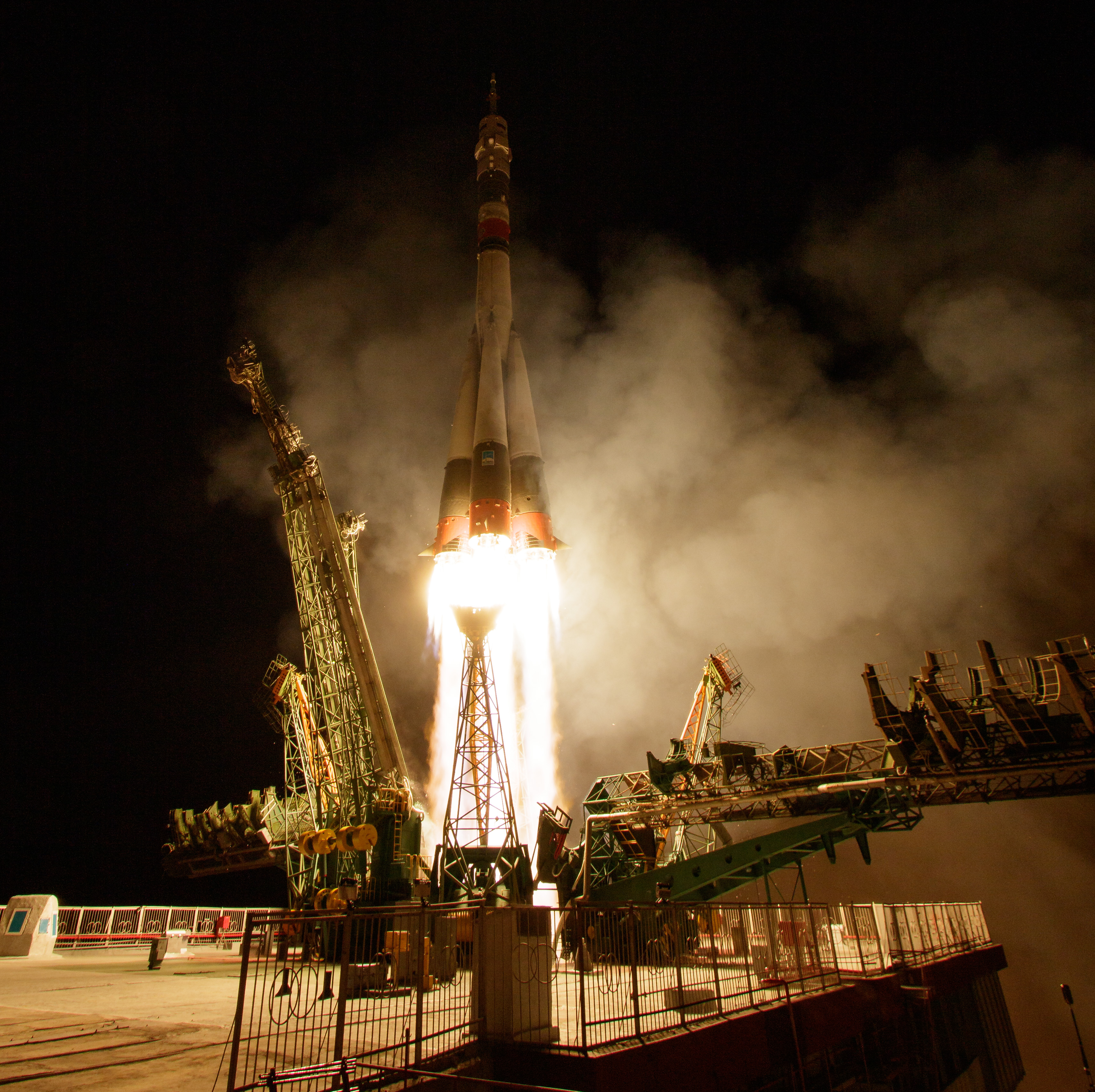
- Soyuz MS-15 launches from Site 1/5 at the Baikonur Cosmodrome, marking the final crewed mission from the historic pad where Yuri Gagarin began humanity's journey into space.
- Names: ISS 61S
- Mission type: ISS crew transport
- Operator: Roscosmos
- COSPAR ID: 2019-064A
- SATCAT no.: 44550
- Mission duration: 204 days, 15 hours and 18 minutes
- Distance travelled: 139,900,000 km (86,900,000 mi)
- Orbits completed: 3,280

Spacecraft properties
- Spacecraft: Soyuz-MS No. 744
- Spacecraft type: Soyuz-MS
- Manufacturer: Energia

Crew
- Crew size: 3
- Members: Oleg Skripochka; Jessica Meir
- Launching: Hazza Al Mansouri
- Landing: Andrew Morgan
- Callsign: Sarmat (Сармат)

Start of mission
- Launch date: 25 September 2019, 13:57:42 UTC
- Rocket: Soyuz-FG No. Ya15000-071
- Launch site: Baikonur, Site 1/5
- Contractor: RKTs Progress

End of mission
- Landing date: 17 April 2020, 05:16:10 UTC
- Landing site: Steppe of Kazakhstan near the town of Dzhezkazgan (47°17′12.6″N 69°32′31.2″E)

Orbital parameters
- Reference system: Geocentric orbit
- Regime: Low Earth orbit
- Perigee altitude: 416 km (258 mi)
- Apogee altitude: 422 km (262 mi)
- Inclination: 51.64°

Docking with ISS
- Docking port: Zvezda aft
- Docking date: 25 September 2019, 19:42:40 UTC
- Undocking date: 17 April 2020, 01:53:00 UTC
- Time docked: 204 days, 6 hours and 10 minutes
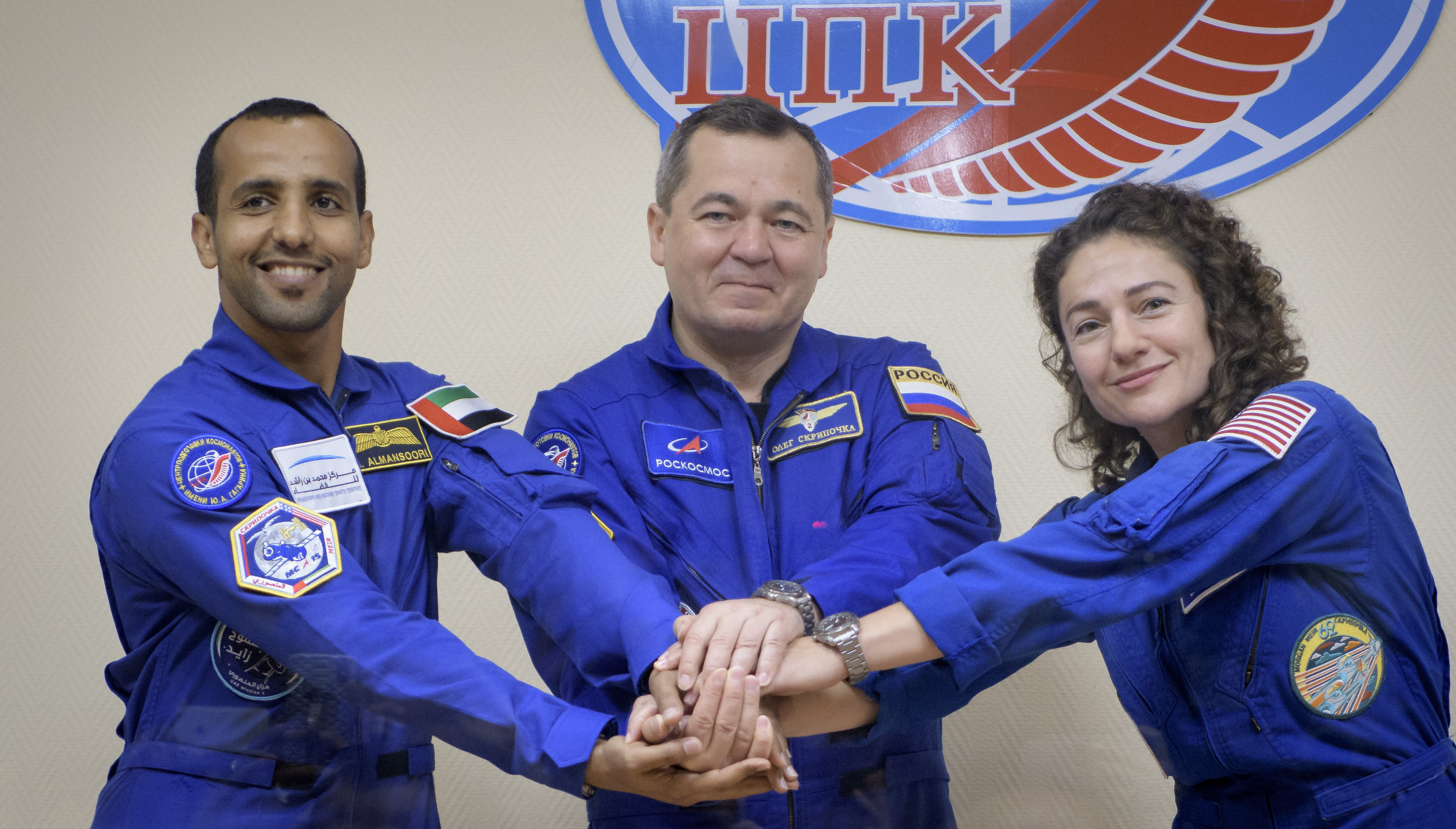
- Mission patch Launching crew, from left: Al Mansouri, Skripochka and Meir Soyuz programme (crewed) Soyuz programme

Soyuz MS-15 was a Soyuz spaceflight launched on 25 September 2019, transporting two members of the Expedition 61 crew and a short duration visiting crew member to the International Space Station. Soyuz MS-15 was the 143rd flight of a Soyuz spacecraft with a crew. It was the last flight of Soyuz-FG launcher before its replacement by the Soyuz-2 in the crewed spaceflight role, and also the final launch from Site 1/5 (Gagarin's Start). The crew consisted of a Russian commander, an American flight engineer, and the first Emirati astronaut. To celebrate this event, pictures of the Soyuz launcher and of Hazza Al Mansouri were projected on Burj Khalifa, the tallest building in the world.

== Crew ==
Prime crew
Position	Launching crew member	Landing crew member
Commander	Oleg Skripochka, Roscosmos; Expedition 61/62; Third and last spaceflight	
Flight engineer	Jessica Meir, NASA; Expedition 61/62; First spaceflight	
Visiting astronaut/Flight engineer	Hazza Al Mansouri, MBRSC; 19th Visiting Expedition; First spaceflight	Andrew Morgan, NASA; Expedition 60/61/62; Only spaceflight

Backup crew
Position	Crew member
Commander	Sergey Ryzhikov, Roscosmos
Flight engineer	Thomas Marshburn, NASA
Visiting astronaut	Sultan Al Neyadi, MBRSC
