= Expedition 61 =

Long-duration mission to the International Space Station

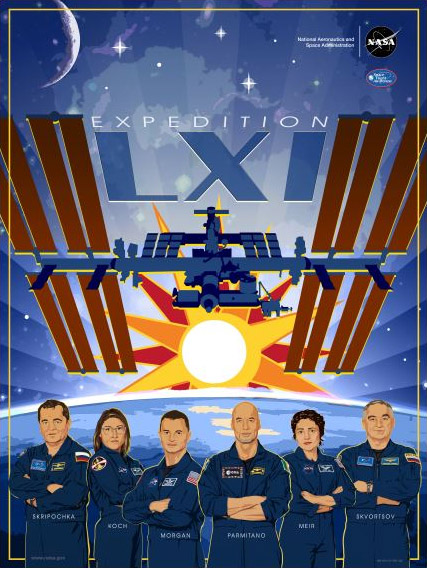
- Promotional Poster
- Mission type: Long-duration expedition
- Mission duration: 125d 22h 12m

Expedition
- Space station: International Space Station
- Began: 3 October 2019, 07:37:32 UTC
- Ended: 6 February 2020, 05:50:28 UTC
- Arrived aboard: Soyuz MS-12; Soyuz MS-13; Soyuz MS-15
- Departed aboard: Soyuz MS-13

Crew
- Crew size: 6
- Members: Expedition 60/61: Luca Parmitano; Aleksandr Skvortsov; Expedition 60/61/62: Andrew Morgan; Expedition 59/60/61: Christina Koch; Expedition 61/62: Oleg Skripochka; Jessica Meir
- EVAs: 9
- EVA duration: 54h 27m
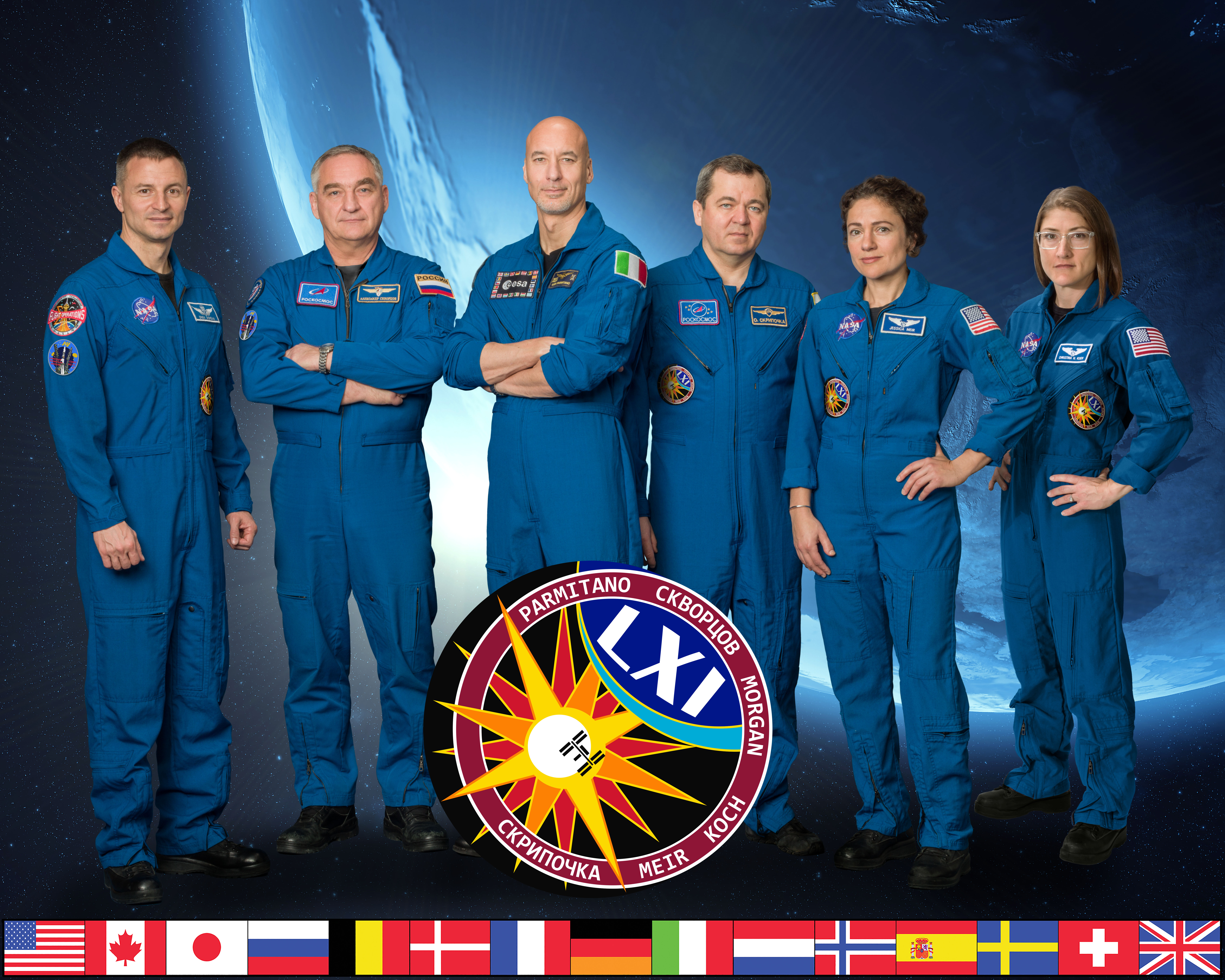
- Expedition 61 mission patch From left: NASA astronaut Andrew Morgan, Roscosmos cosmonaut Alexander Skvortsov, astronaut Luca Parmitano of ESA (European Space Agency), Roscosmos cosmonaut Oleg Skripochka, and NASA astronauts Jessica Meir and Christina Koch. ISS expeditions

Expedition 61 was the 61st expedition to the International Space Station, which began on 3 October 2019 with the undocking of the Soyuz MS-12 spacecraft. The Expedition was commanded by ESA astronaut Luca Parmitano, who became the third European and first Italian astronaut to command the ISS. Parmitano, along with his Soyuz MS-13 colleagues Aleksandr Skvortsov and Andrew Morgan, and Christina Koch from Soyuz MS-12, transferred over from Expedition 60. They were joined by Oleg Skripochka and Jessica Meir, who launched on 25 September 2019 on board Soyuz MS-15.

== Crew ==
Position	Crew member
Commander	Luca Parmitano, ESA; Second spaceflight
Flight engineer	Aleksandr Skvortsov, RSA; Third and last spaceflight
Flight engineer	Andrew Morgan, NASA; Only spaceflight
Flight engineer	Christina Koch, NASA; First spaceflight
Flight engineer	Oleg Skripochka, RSA; Third and last spaceflight
Flight engineer	Jessica Meir, NASA; First spaceflight

== Other crewed spaceflights to the ISS ==
According to a Flight Planning Integration Panel (FPIP) document obtained by NASAspaceflight.com in June 2019, Expedition 61 was tentatively scheduled to see two visits from Commercial Crew Development spacecraft. However, schedule slippages meant these visits will not occur.

- The Crew Dragon Demo-2 mission with American astronauts Bob Behnken and Douglas Hurley had a planning date for a 15 November 2019 launch and 22 November landing, with a brief stay on the ISS in between.
- The Boeing Crewed Flight Test of the Starliner capsule had a planning date for a 30 November 2019 launch. It was proposed American astronauts Mike Finke, Nicole Mann, and Chris Ferguson would dock to the International Space Station on 1 December and remain on the station until May 2020; it was unclear if these astronauts would have been formally considered ISS visitors, part of the Expedition 61 crew, or prompt the start of Expedition 62.

== Spacewalks ==
Expedition 61 crew conducted nine spacewalks, more than in any other increment in the history of the ISS.

Four spacewalks were conducted to repair the Alpha Magnetic Spectrometer. The repairs were conducted by ESA astronaut Luca Parmitano and NASA astronaut Andrew Morgan. Both of them were assisted by NASA astronauts Christina Koch and Jessica Meir, who operated the Canadarm2 robotic arm from inside the Station. The spacewalks were described as the "most challenging since Hubble repairs".

There were multiple spacewalks in order to repair and improve ISS batteries. On 18 October 2019, Christina Koch and Jessica Meir took the first all female spacewalk in history.

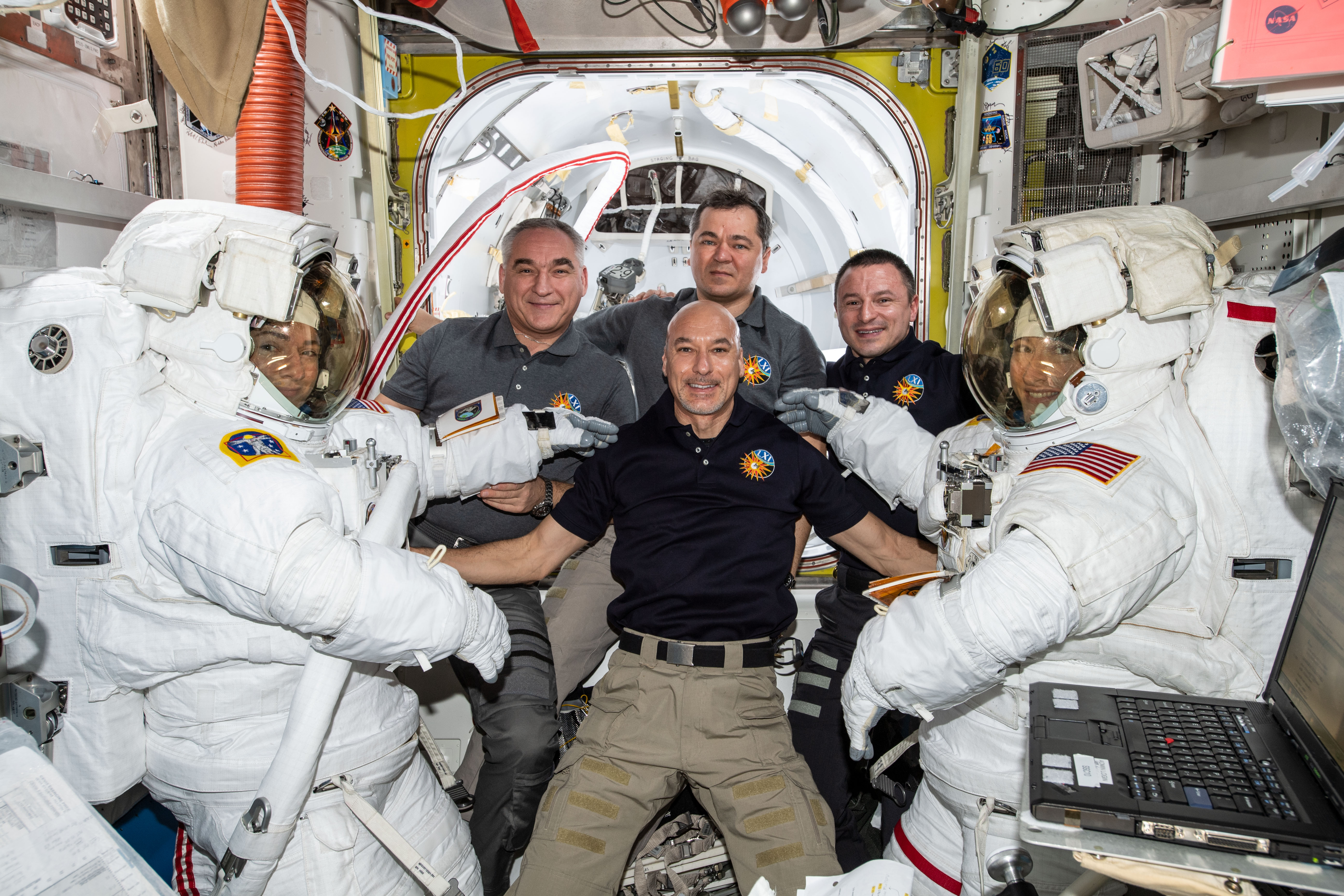
Jessica Meir (left) and Christina Koch (right) before their spacewalk, next to (left to right) Aleksandr Skvortsov, Luca Parmitano (commander), Oleg Skripochka, and Andrew Morgan
