= Oleg Skripochka =

Russian engineer and cosmonaut (born 1969)

- Олег Скрипочка
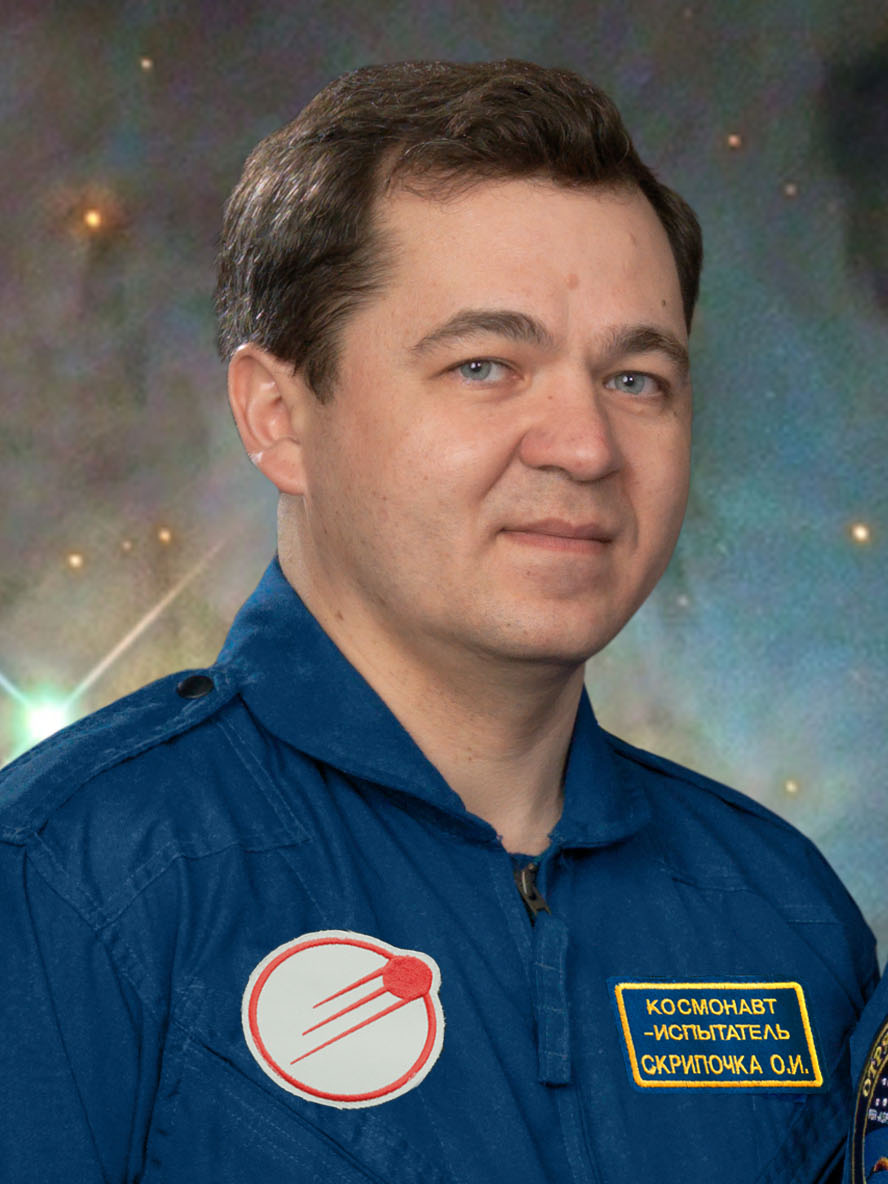
- Skripochka in 2010
- Born: 24 December 1969 (age 56); Nevinnomyssk, Stavropol Krai, Russian SFSR, Soviet Union
- Occupation: Cosmonaut
- Space career

Roscosmos cosmonaut
- Current occupation: Mechanical engineer
- Status: Retired
- Time in space: 536d 03h 49m
- Selection: 1997 Cosmonaut Group
- Total EVAs: 3
- Total EVA time: 16 hours, 40 minutes
- Missions: Soyuz TMA-01M (Expedition 25/26), Soyuz TMA-20M (Expedition 47/48), Soyuz MS-15 (Expedition 61/62)
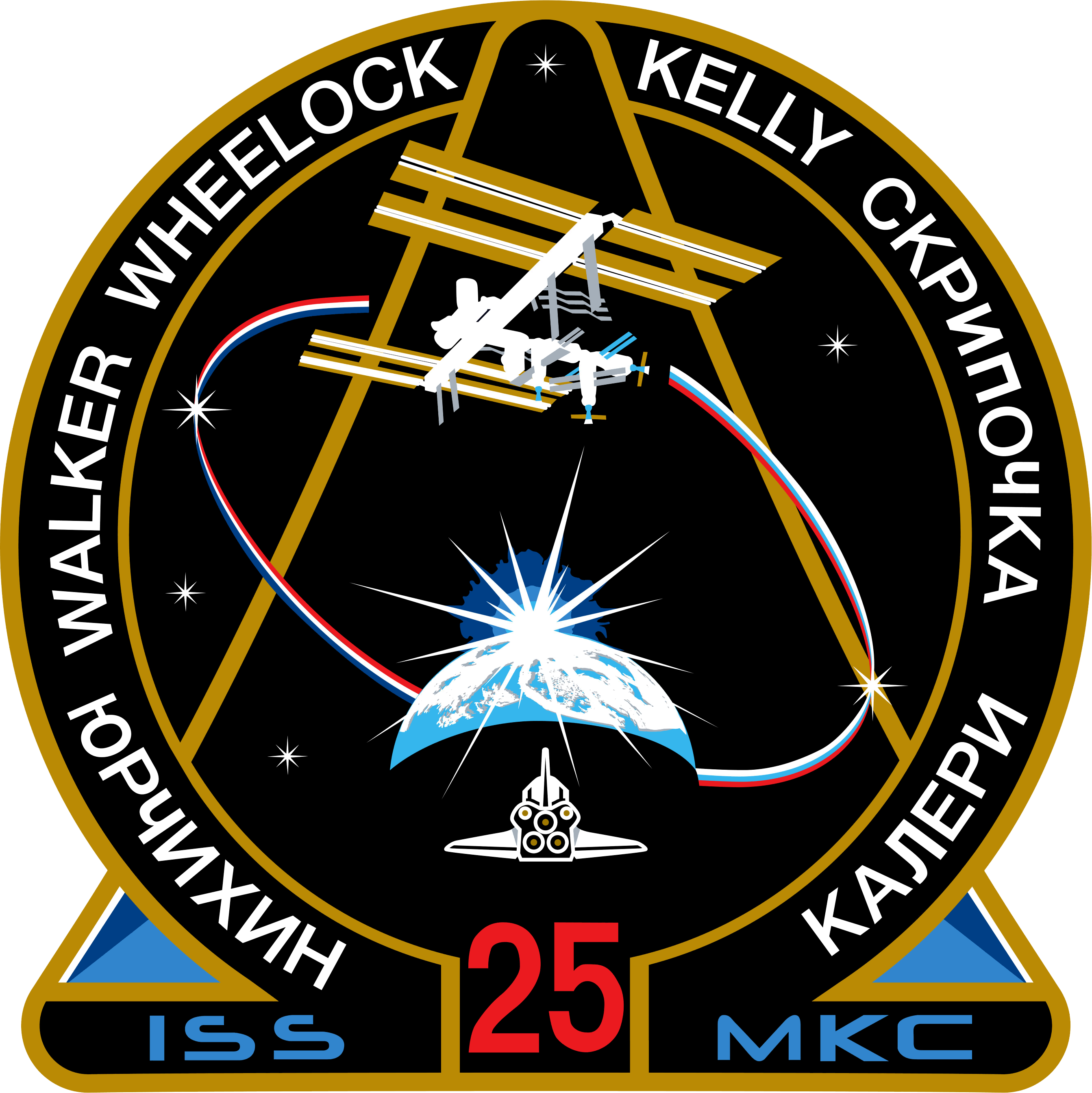
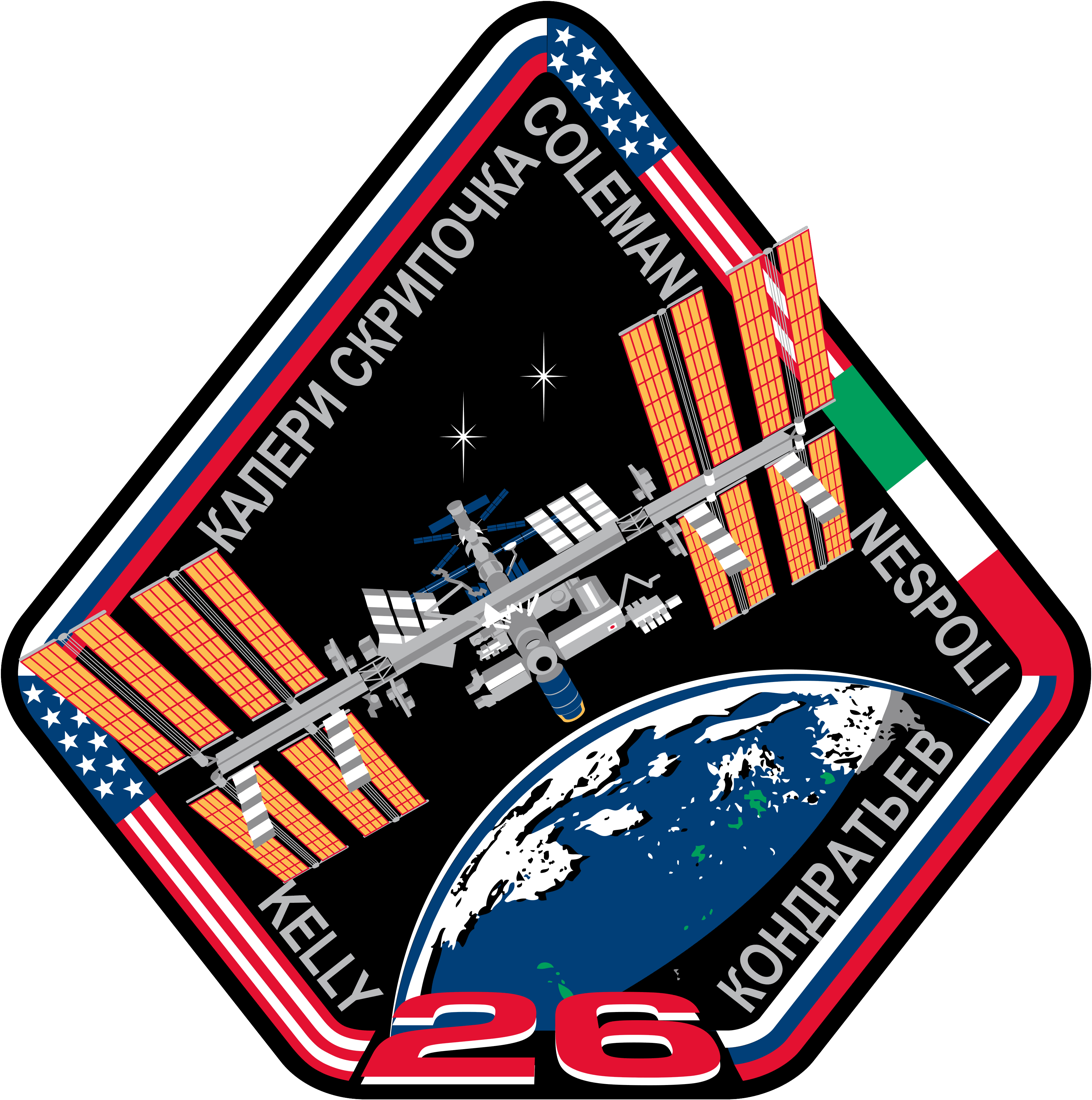
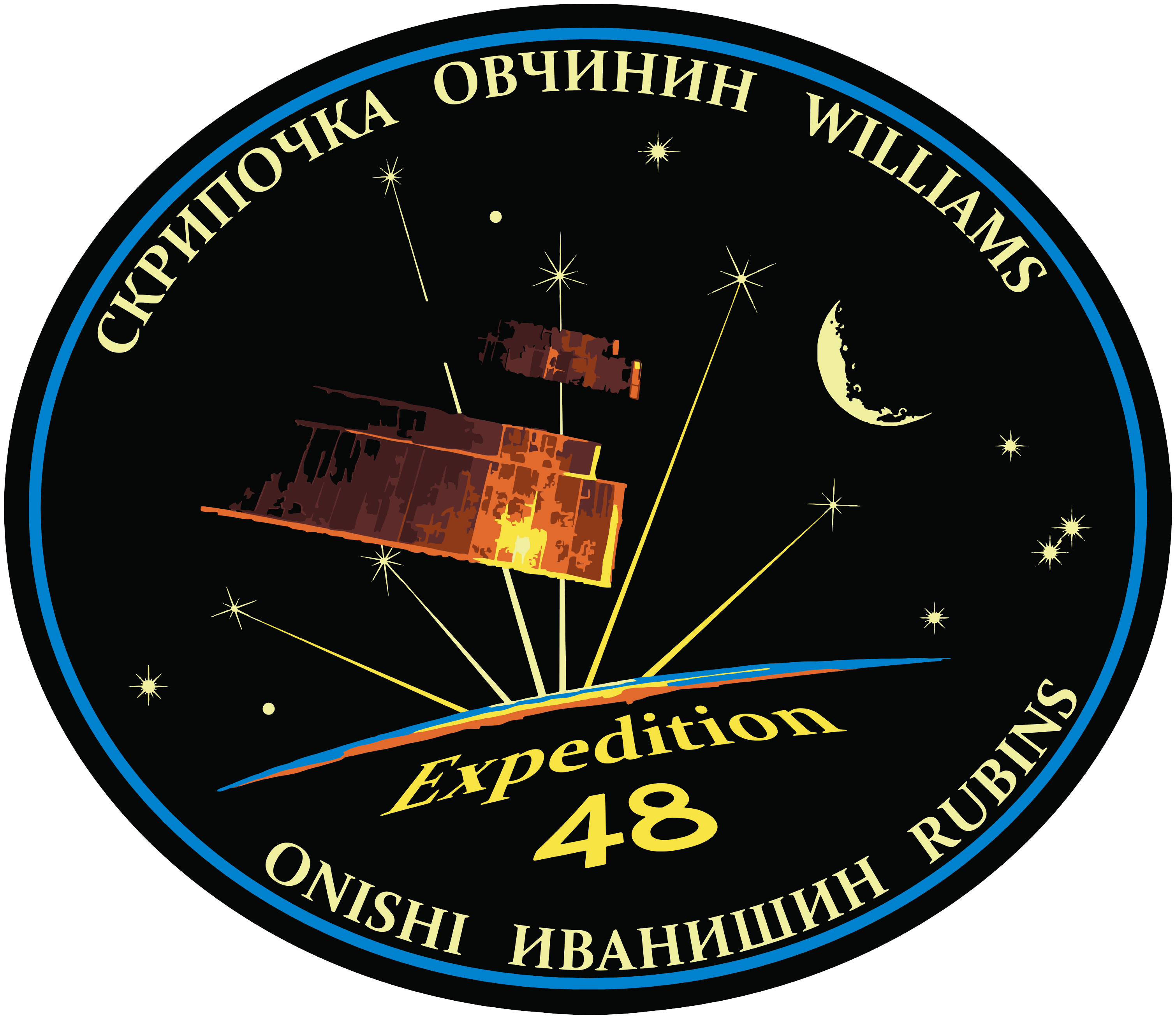
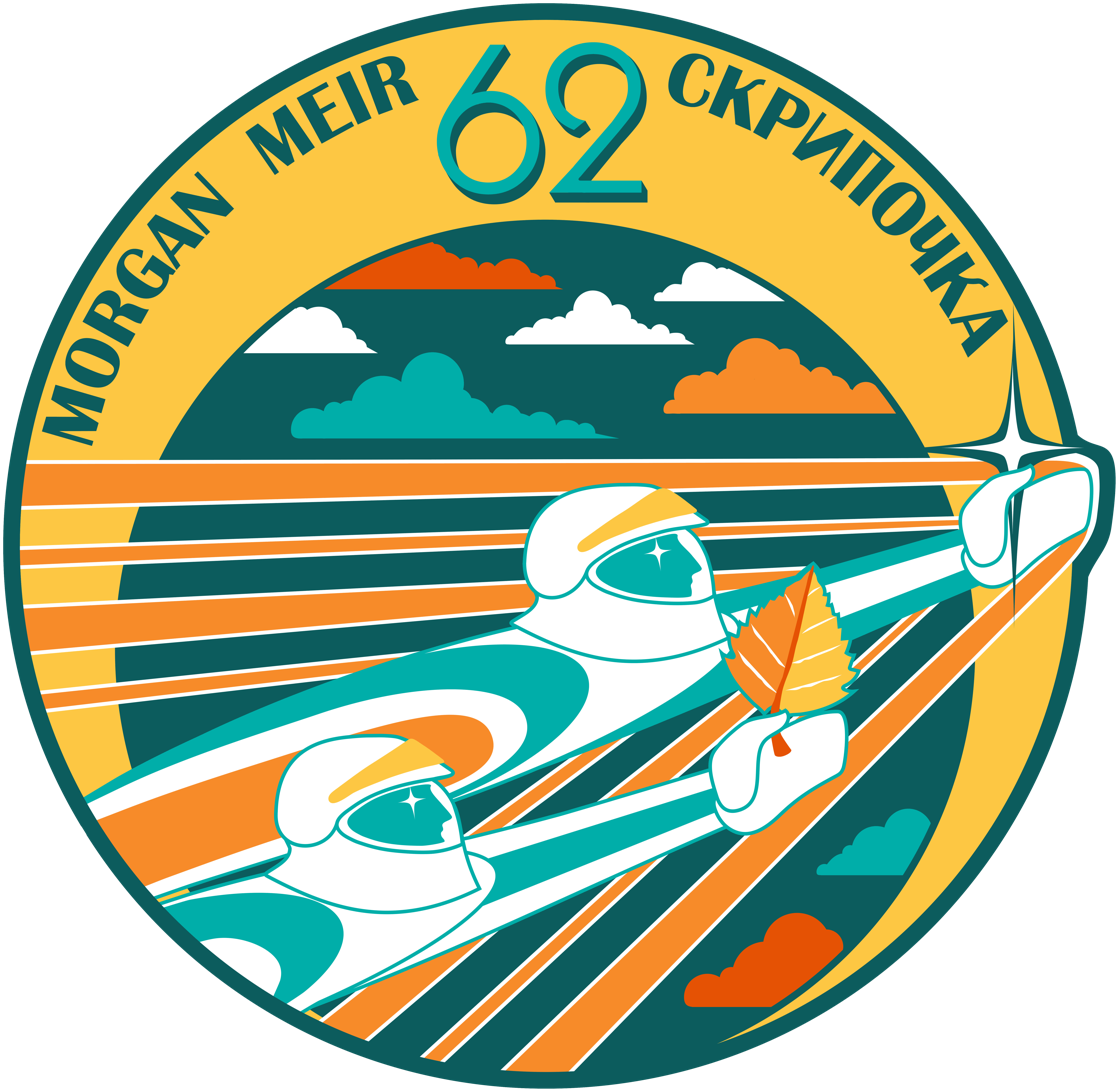
- Mission insignia
- Retired: December 1, 2021

Oleg Ivanovich Skripochka (Russian: Оле́г Ива́нович Скри́почка; born 24 December 1969 in Nevinnomyssk, Stavropol Krai, Russian SFSR, Soviet Union) is a Russian engineer and former cosmonaut. In 2011, he was in space serving as an Expedition 25/26 crewmember.

On 12 April 2011, Skripochka was awarded the titles of Hero of the Russian Federation and Pilot-Cosmonaut of the Russian Federation for courage and heroism in the implementation of long-duration space flight on the International Space Station.

== Education ==
He was born into a soldier's family and lived in Nevinnomyssk in the North Caucasus, in Petropavlovsk-Kamchatsky in the Russian Far East and in Zaporizhia in Soviet Ukraine. Skripochka entered the Bauman Moscow State Technical University after graduating from high school in Zaporizhia in 1987. He graduated in 1993 from the university with a diploma of mechanical engineer in rocket construction.

== Experience ==
Skripochka worked as a test-metal worker between 1987 and 1991 and as a Technician between 1991 and 1993 in the scientific-industrial association project bureau at Energia. After graduating from the Bauman Moscow State Technical University, from August 1993 to August 1997 he worked as an engineer in Energia RSC project bureau on the development of transport and cargo vehicles.

== Roscosmos career ==
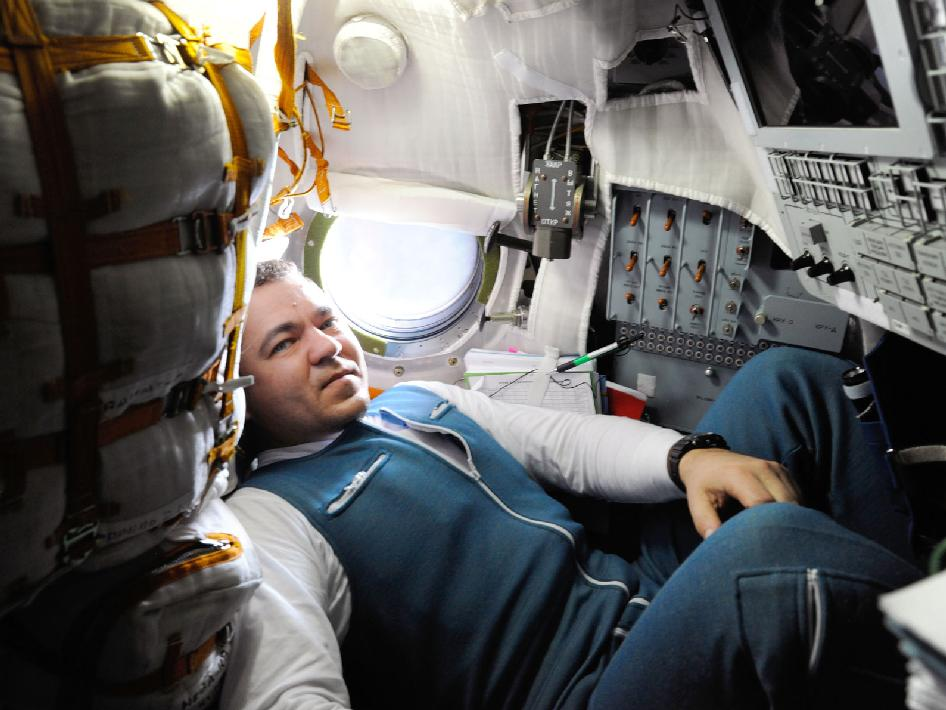
Skripochka is pictured inside the Soyuz TMA-01M spacecraft on docking day with the ISS.

In 1997, Skripochka was selected as a test cosmonaut and from January 1998 to November 1999, he studied the advanced space training course. From April 2007 to April 2008, he trained as an ISS Expedition 17 backup crewmember (Soyuz TMA and ISS flight engineer). From August 2008 he trained as an ISS Expedition 25/26 and Soyuz TMA-M flight engineer.

=== Expedition 25/26 ===
Skripochka was a member (Flight Engineer) of the ISS Expedition 25/26, that was launched on 7 October 2010 from Baikonur Cosmodrome, aboard Soyuz TMA-01M spacecraft, together with cosmonaut Aleksandr Kaleri and NASA astronaut Scott Kelly. Skripochka arrived at the ISS after the Soyuz spacecraft linked up with the space station at 00:01 UTC on 10 October 2010. He stayed on board the ISS till March 2011. During their mission, Skripochka and the rest of the Expedition 25/26 crew participated in a wide array of research, including fundamental physics, biometric experiments and investigations of crystal growth in space, as well as education outreach.

After spending 159 days in space, Skripochka returned to Earth on 16 March 2011. The Soyuz TMA-01M spacecraft carrying Skripochka, Kaleri and Kelly undocked from the Poisk module at 4:27 GMT. Following a nominal re-entry, the Soyuz capsule touched down on its side at 7:54 GMT near Arkalyk in north central Kazakhstan. A few minutes later, Skripochka and his two crew members were pulled from the capsule and placed in reclining chairs.

The weather at the landing side was harsh with high winds and viciously cold temperatures. At one point in his live landing commentary, NASA spokesman Rob Navias said "You would think that was a scene out of the North Pole," to explain the extreme climatic conditions.

=== Spacewalks ===
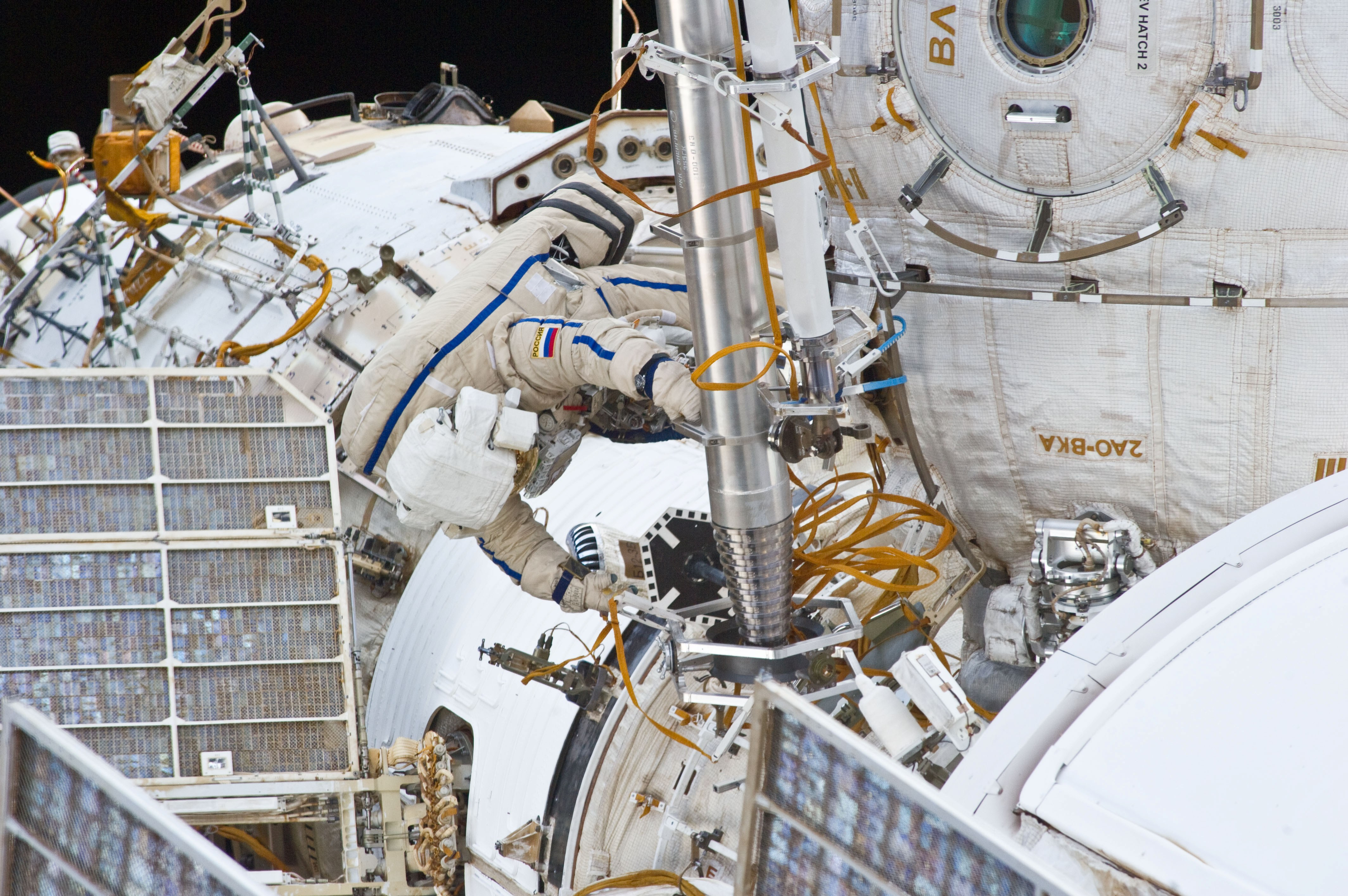
Skripochka participating in Russian EVA #26 works outside the space station.

Skripochka participated in three spacewalks during his stay aboard the space station as an Expedition 25 and 26 Flight Engineer.

=== Russian EVA #26 ===
On 15 November 2010, Skripochka participated in a spacewalk with fellow Russian cosmonaut and Expedition 25 Flight Engineer Fyodor Yurchikhin. At 13:25 UTC, he and Yurchikhin ventured into space outside the ISS from the Pirs airlock to conduct Russian EVA #26. The spacewalk lasted six hours and 27 minutes. It was the first for Skripochka, who was in the spacesuit marked with blue stripes (Orlan-MK #5). The two cosmonauts removed Kontur and Expose-R scientific experiments. The Kontur experiment studied remote object control capability for robotic arms and the Expose-R experiment is a European Space Agency experiment designed to expose organic material to the extreme environment of space. During the spacewalk, Skripochka and Yurchikhin also installed a portable multipurpose workstation on the Zvezda service module and installed handrail extensions between the Poisk Module and both Zvezda and Zarya modules. They performed an experiment called Test, which is aimed at verifying the existence of micro organisms or contamination underneath insulation on the Russian segment of the ISS. Skripochka and Yurchikhin removed a television camera from the Rassvet module, however they were not able to relocate the camera due to interference with insulation where it was to be installed.

=== Russian EVA #27 ===
During the second spacewalk (Russian EVA #27), conducted on 21 January 2011, Skripochka and cosmonaut Dmitri Kondratyev focused to complete installation of a new high-speed data transmission system. Skripochka was designated as Extravehicular 2, and had a blue stripe on his spacesuit. Skripochka also wore a NASA-provided wireless television camera system and helmet lights to provide live point-of-view video to Mission Control-Moscow. Kondratyev and Skripochka began the five-hour, 23-minute spacewalk at 9:29 a.m. EST when the two cosmonauts opened the Pirs hatch and began exiting the Russian segment of the space station. The spacewalk ended at 2:52 p.m EST. They deployed the antenna for the Radio Technical System for Information Transfer, an experimental system designed to enable large data files to be downlinked using radio technology at a speed of about 100 MB/s from space station's Russian segment.

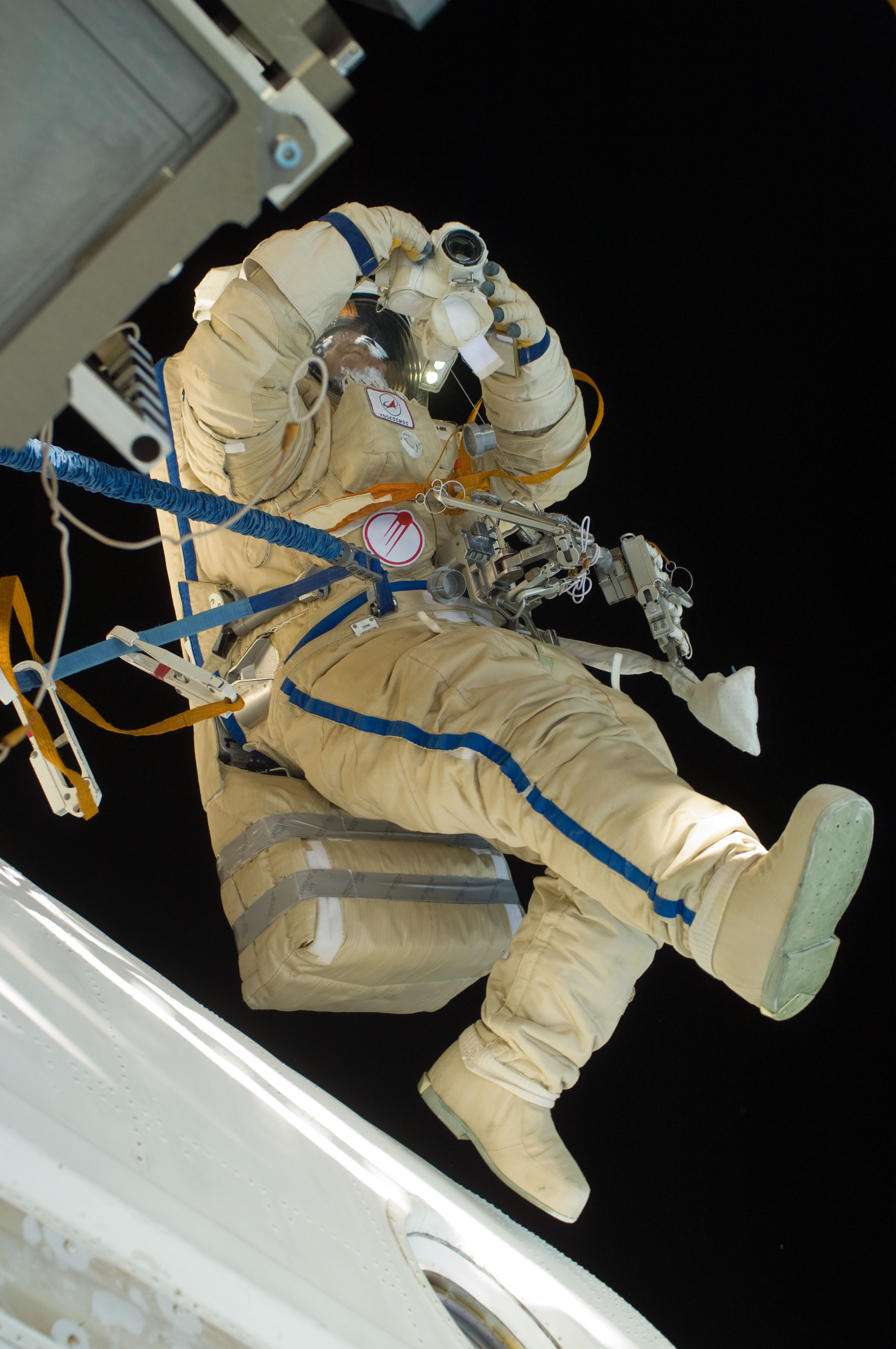
Skripochka during the EVA #28

During the spacewalk, Kondratyev and Skripochka also removed the plasma pulse generator on the port side of the Zvezda module that was part of an experiment to investigate disturbances and changes in the ionosphere from space station impulse plasma flow. The generator, was covered, removed and returned inside the Pirs airlock. They also removed the commercial Expose-R experiment from the port side of Zvezda. The joint Russian and European Space Agency package contains a number of material samples that were left open to space conditions. Working inside the Pirs airlock, Kondratyev and Skripochka grabbed the new docking camera for the Rassvet module (MRM1) and carried it to the worksite on Rassvet. They installed the camera and mated the camera's cable to a pre-wired connector that will route the video into the space station.

=== Russian EVA #28 ===
On 16 February 2011, Skripochka and Kondratyev participated in a spacewalk (Russian EVA #28) outside the ISS. The tasks for Skripochka and Kondratyev included to install a radio antenna, deploy a nano satellite, install two experiments and retrieve two exposure panels on a third experiment. The experiments they installed are the Molniya-Gamma experiment, which measures gamma splashes and optical radiation during terrestrial lightning and thunder conditions, and a high-speed data transmission system experiment that uses radio technology. The exposure panels retrieved are part of the Komplast experiment.

=== Expedition 47/48 ===
Skripochka returned to space on Soyuz TMA-20M at 19 March 2016 03:09 UTC, as part of the Expedition 47/48 crew.

=== Expedition 61/62 ===
Skripochka launched to the International Space Station on board Soyuz MS-15 on 25 September 2019, as a member of Expeditions 61 and 62. He returned to Earth April 17, 2020.

== See also ==
- List of Heroes of the Russian Federation

Preceded by Luca Parmitano	ISS Commander (Expedition 62); 6 February to 17 April 2020	Succeeded by Christopher Cassidy
