= Soyuz MS-13 =

2019 Russian crewed spaceflight to the ISS

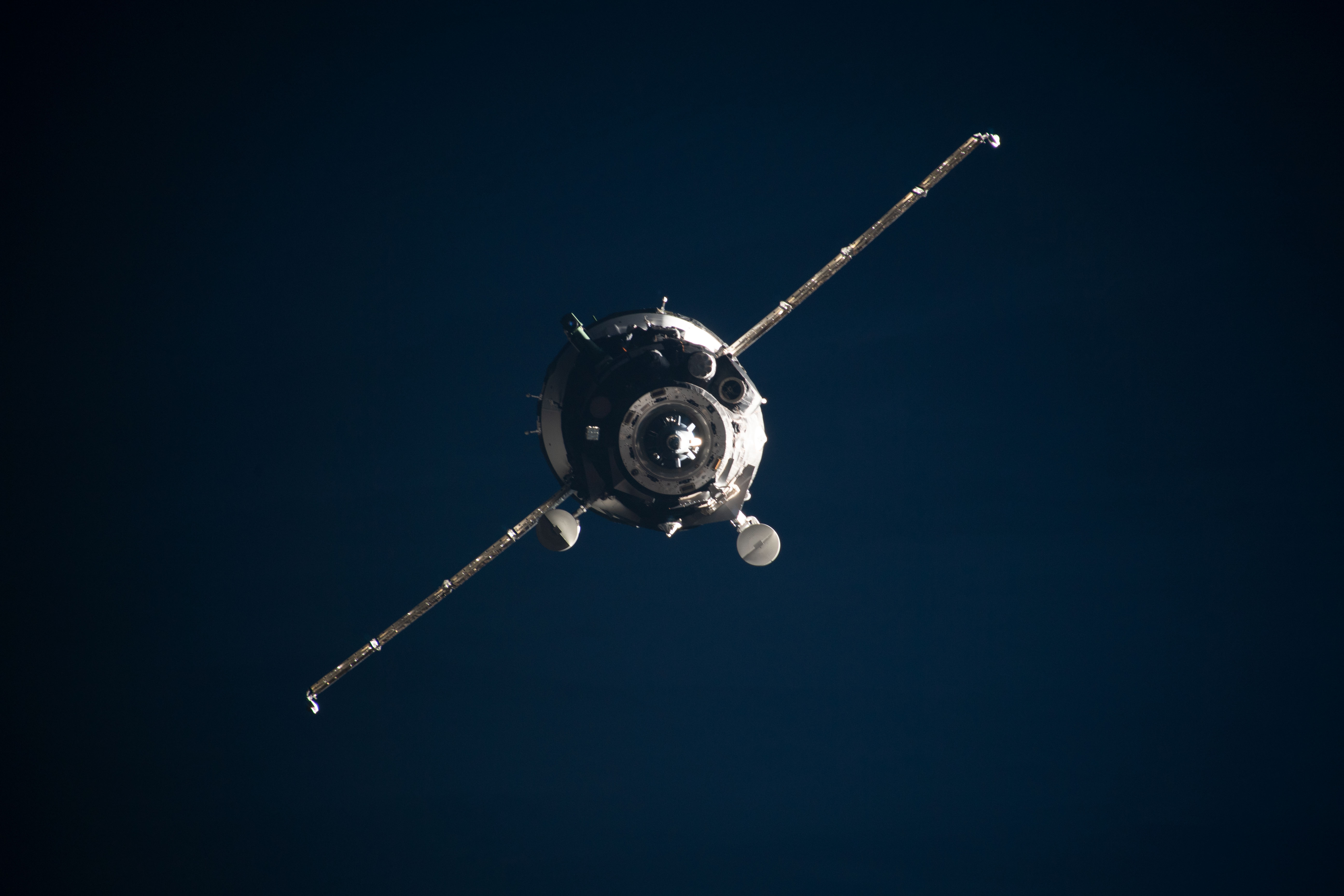
- Soyuz MS-13 approaches the ISS
- Mission type: ISS crew transport
- Operator: Roscosmos
- COSPAR ID: 2019-041A
- SATCAT no.: 44437
- Mission duration: 200d 16h 44m
- Orbits completed: 3,216

Spacecraft properties
- Spacecraft: Soyuz-MS
- Spacecraft type: Soyuz-MS 11F747 No. 746
- Manufacturer: Energia

Crew
- Crew size: 3
- Members: Aleksandr Skvortsov; Luca Parmitano
- Launching: Andrew R. Morgan
- Landing: Christina Koch
- Callsign: Cliff

Start of mission
- Launch date: 20 July 2019, 16:28:21 UTC
- Rocket: Soyuz-FG
- Launch site: Baikonur, Site 1/5
- Contractor: RKTs Progress

End of mission
- Landing date: 6 February 2020, 09:12:45 UTC
- Landing site: Steppes of Kazakhstan.

Orbital parameters
- Reference system: Geocentric
- Regime: Low Earth
- Inclination: 51.6°

Docking with ISS
- Docking port: Zvezda aft
- Docking date: 20 July 2019, 22:47:50 UTC
- Undocking date: 26 August 2019, 03:35 UTC
- Time docked: 36 days, 4 hours and 48 minutes

Docking with ISS (relocation)
- Docking port: Poisk zenith
- Docking date: 26 August 2019, 03:59 UTC
- Undocking date: 6 February 2020, 05:50:28 UTC
- Time docked: 164d 1h 51m
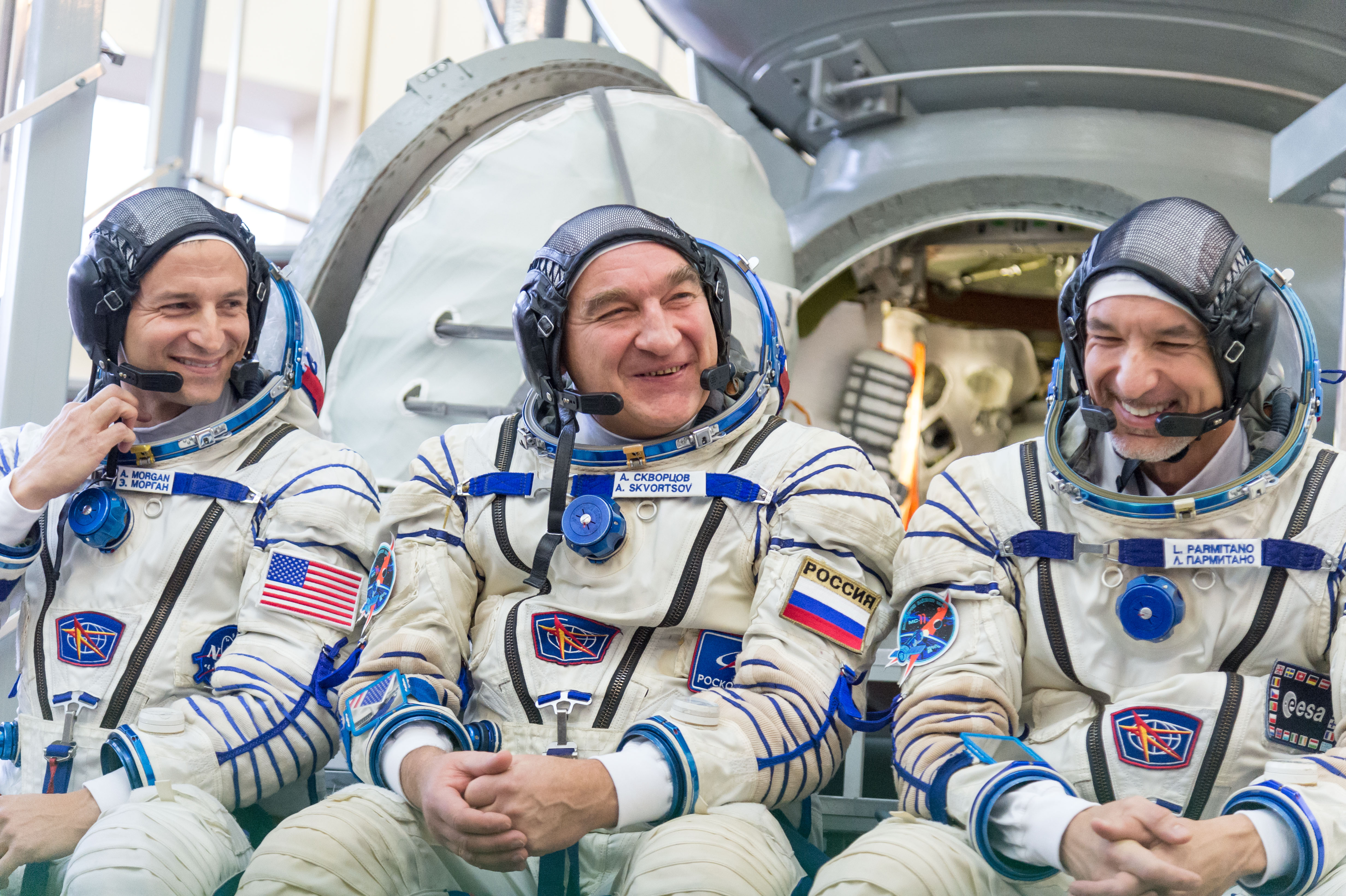
- Mission insignia (l-r) Morgan, Skvortsov and Parmitano Soyuz programme (crewed)

Soyuz MS-13, also designated ISS flight 59S, was a crewed Soyuz mission launched on 20 July 2019 – the 50th anniversary of the first Moon landing – carrying three members of the Expedition 60 crew to the International Space Station: a Russian commander, an American flight engineer, and a European flight engineer. Soyuz MS-13 was the 142nd flight of a Soyuz spacecraft. It was at one point the last Soyuz flight contracted by NASA in the expectation that subsequent astronaut transport would be provided by the Commercial Crew Program, but in early 2019, NASA sought to purchase two additional Soyuz seats to provide greater certainty given delays in that program. The European segment of the mission was called "Beyond".

== Crew ==
Prime crew
Position	Launching crew	Landing crew
Commander	(Russia) Aleksandr Skvortsov, Roscosmos; Expedition 60/61; Third and last spaceflight	
Flight engineer	(Italy) Luca Parmitano, ESA; Expedition 60/61; Second spaceflight	
Flight engineer	(United States) Andrew R. Morgan, NASA; Expedition 60/61/62; Only spaceflight	(United States) Christina Koch, NASA; Expedition 59/60/61; First spaceflight

Backup crew
Position	Crew
Commander	(Russia) Sergey Ryzhikov, Roscosmos
Flight engineer	(United States) Thomas Marshburn, NASA
Flight engineer	(Japan) Soichi Noguchi, NASA

== Relocation ==
The Soyuz crew relocated the MS-13 spacecraft from the aft port of the Zvezda module and performed a manual docking on the Poisk module on 26 August 2019. This cleared the way for Soyuz MS-14 to perform an automatic docking on Zvezda, after a faulty signal amplifier on Poisk caused MS-14's first docking attempt to abort on 24 August 2019. The last time a Soyuz spacecraft was relocated was in August 2015 during the Soyuz TMA-16M mission.
