= Ivan Vagner =

Russian cosmonaut (born 1985)

- Иван Вагнер
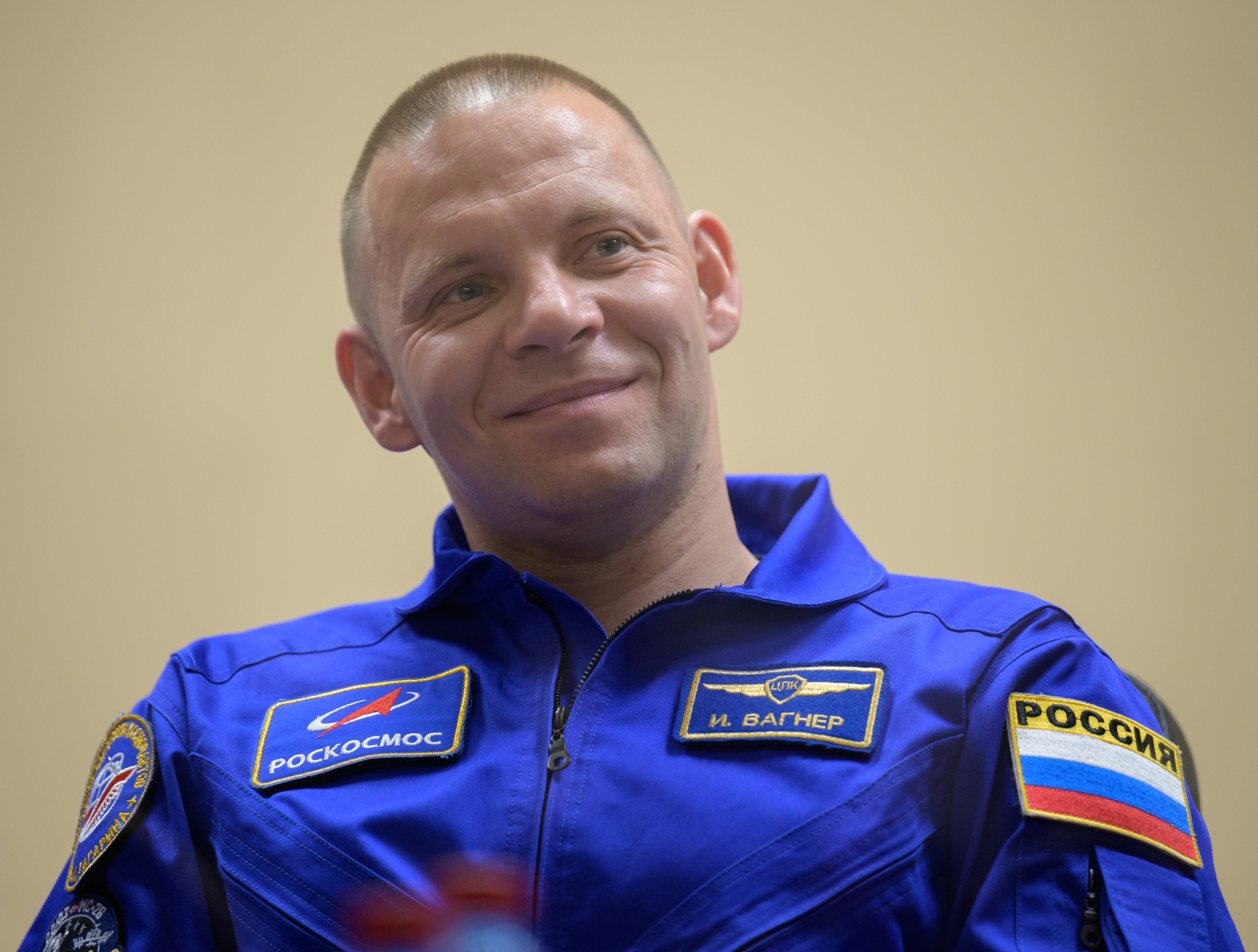
- Born: Ivan Viktorovich Vagner; 10 July 1985 (age 41); Severoonezhsk, Soviet Union
- Education: Baltic State Technical University
- Space career

Roscosmos cosmonaut
- Status: Active
- Time in space: 416 days, 3 hours and 46 minutes
- Selection: 2010 RSA Group
- Total EVAs: 1
- Total EVA time: 7 hours, 17 minutes
- Missions: Soyuz MS-16 (Expedition 62/63); Soyuz MS-26 (Expedition 71/72)
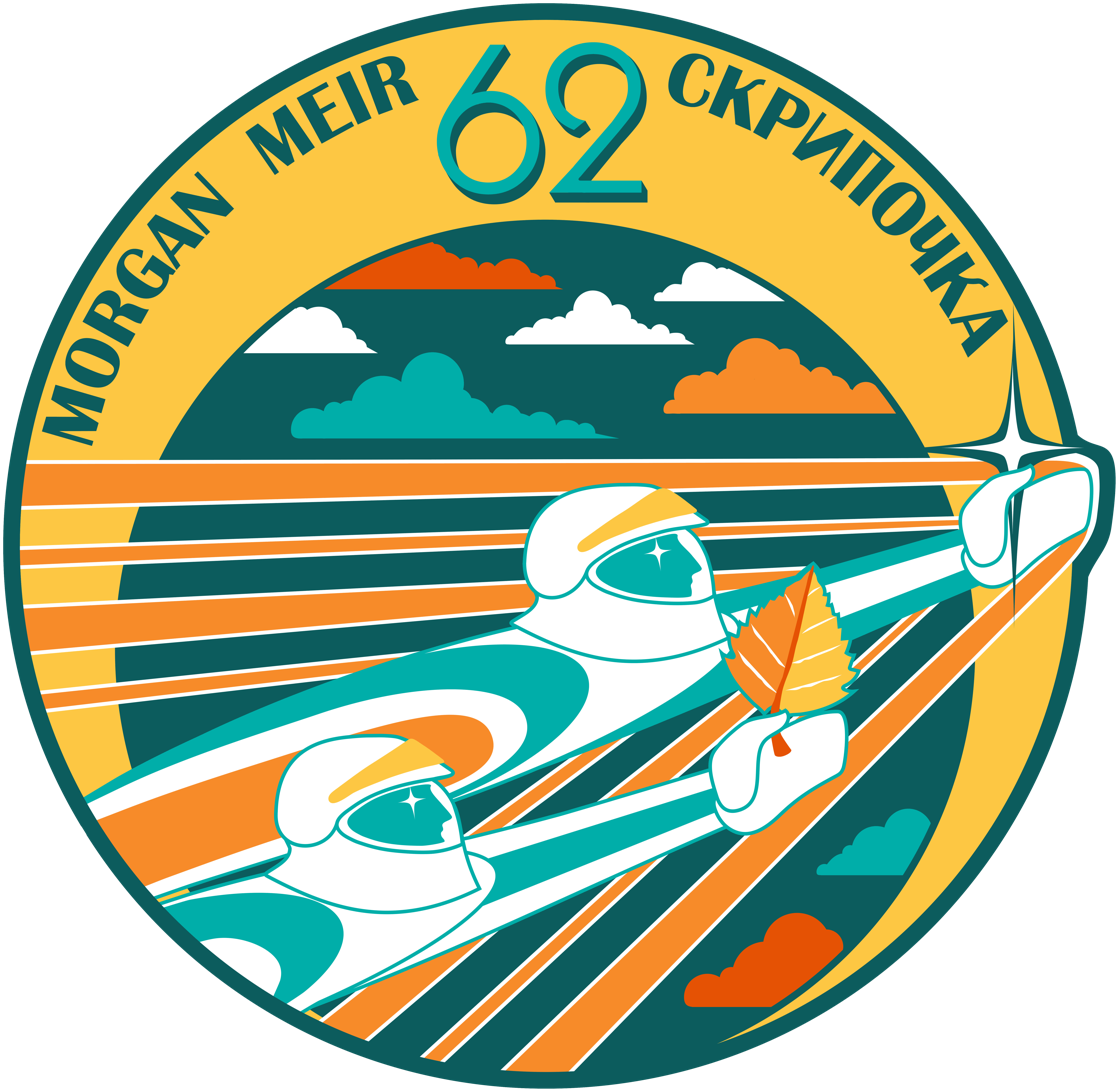
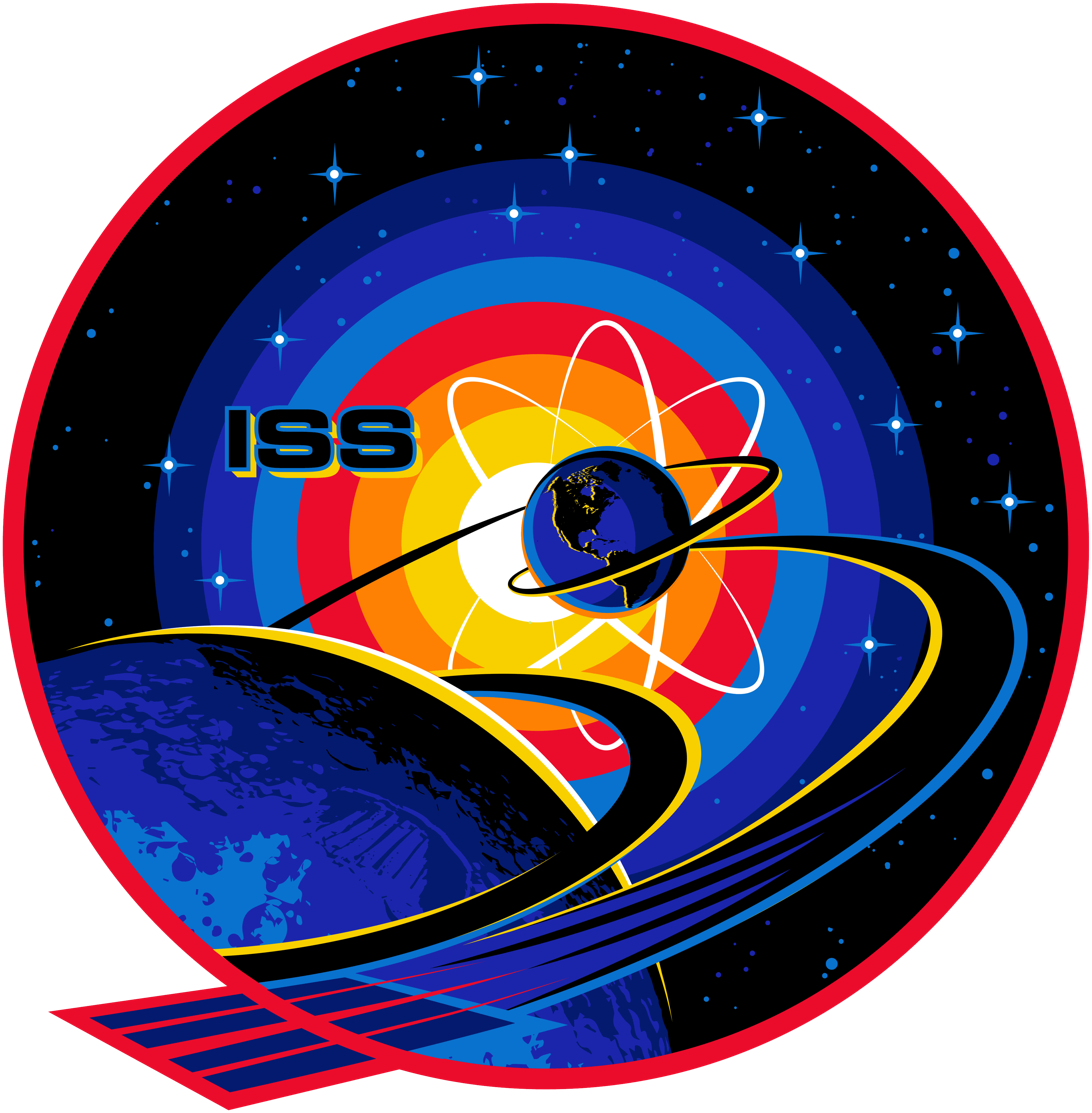
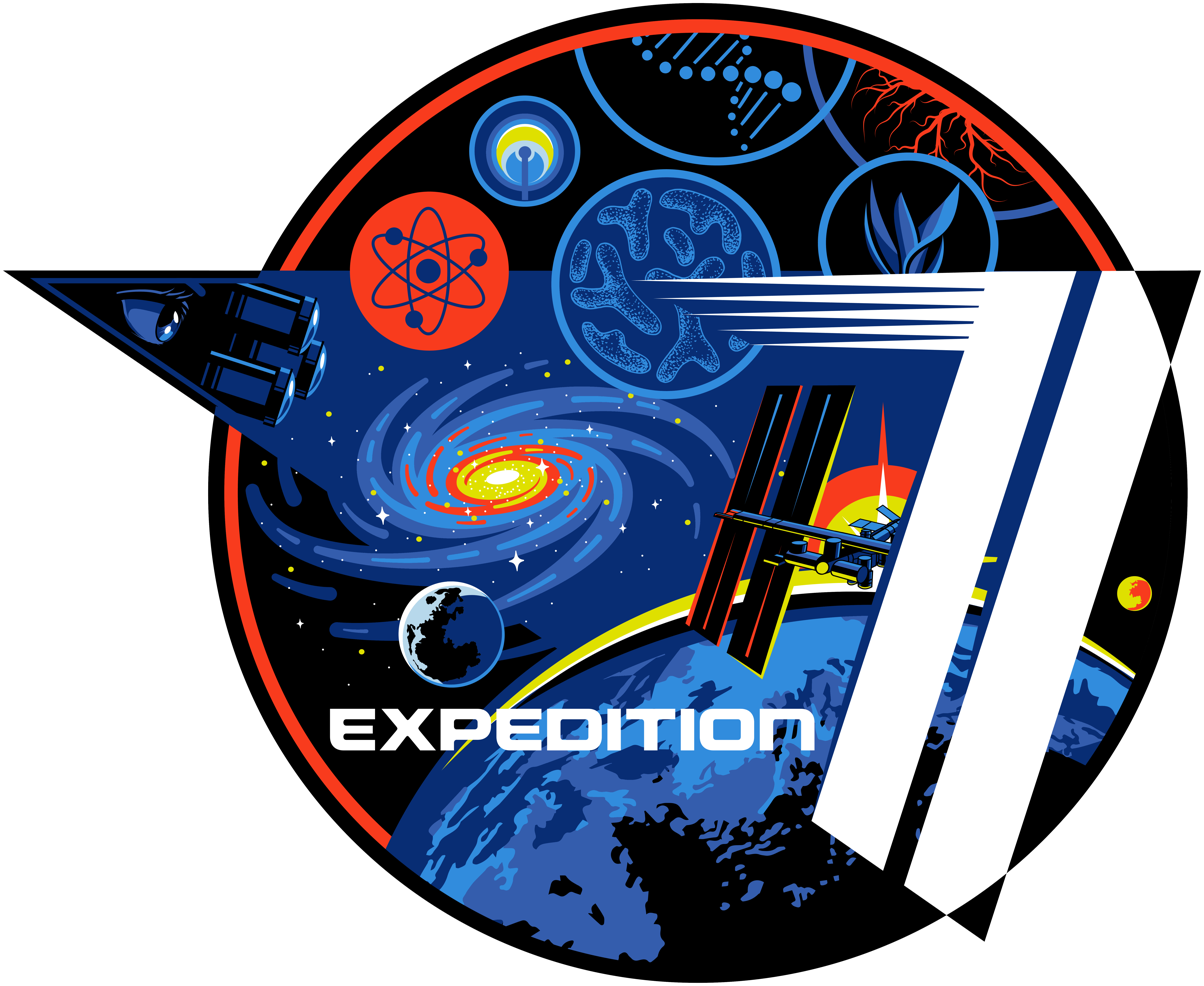
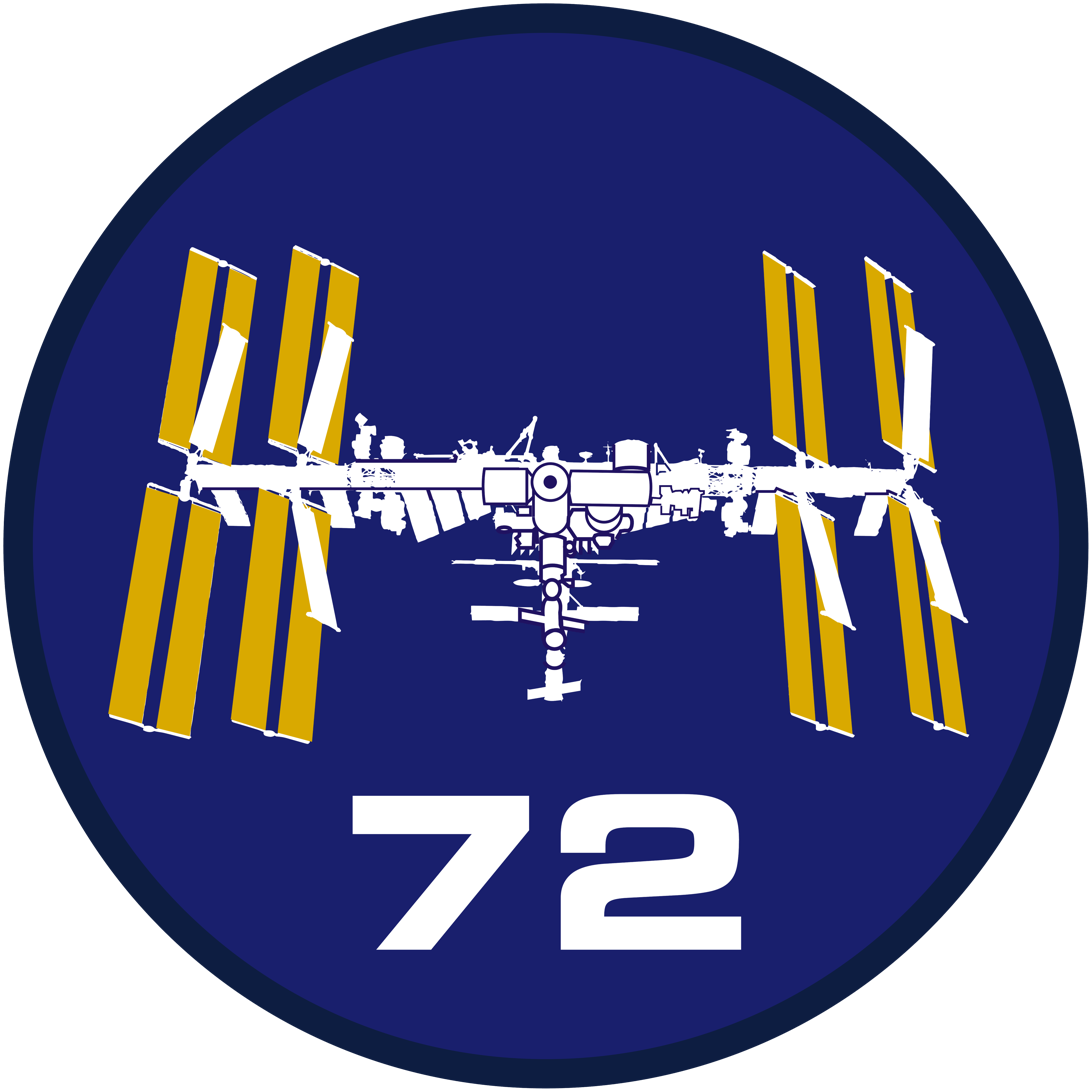
- Mission insignia

Ivan Viktorovich Vagner (Russian: Иван Вагнер, born 10 July 1985) is a Russian engineer and cosmonaut who was selected in October 2010. He graduated from the Baltic State Technical University in 2008, before working as an engineer for RKK Energia.

He began his first spaceflight in April 2020 as a flight engineer on Soyuz MS-16 and Expedition 62/63.

== Early life and education ==
Vagner was born on 10 July 1985 in the Severoonezhsk village in the Arkhangelsk region of Russia. He attended North-Onega secondary school from 1993 to 2003 before going on to study engineering at Baltic State Technical University. In 2009 he graduated from Baltic State with a master's degree in Aeronautical Engineering.

== Engineering career ==
From 2007, Vagner worked as a design engineer for Klimov JSC, a Russian company that builds Gas-turbine engines for military and civil aircraft. The following year he went on to work at RSC Energia as an engineer, working as an assistant flight manager for the International Space Station program from February 2009 until his selection as a cosmonaut in October 2010.

== Cosmonaut career ==
Vagner graduated basic spaceflight training in 2012. In January 2016 he was assigned to the crew of ISS Expedition 53/54 but was removed from the flight in September 2016 due to crew cutbacks on the Russian Orbital Segment on the ISS caused by delays with the launch of the Nauka laboratory module.

=== Expedition 62/63 ===
Vagner was assigned to back up to Russian Flight Engineer Andrei Babkin onboard Soyuz MS-16, scheduled to launch in April 2020. However, in February 2020 Babkin and spacecraft commander Nikolai Tikhonov were removed from the flight due to a temporary health condition with Tikhonov, subsequently Vagner and Anatoli Ivanishin (Tikhonov's backup) were moved forward onto the prime crew.

He, alongside Ivanishin and NASA astronaut Christopher Cassidy, launched successfully arriving in orbit and docking with the ISS six hours later on 9 April 2020, officially joining the Expedition 62 crew alongside Roscosmos cosmonaut Oleg Skripochka and NASA astronauts Jessica Meir and Andrew Morgan. Following a very short hand over period, Skripochka, Meir and Morgan departed the station aboard Soyuz MS-15 leaving Vagner and his two crew mates on board the station as Expedition 63, with Cassidy taking command.

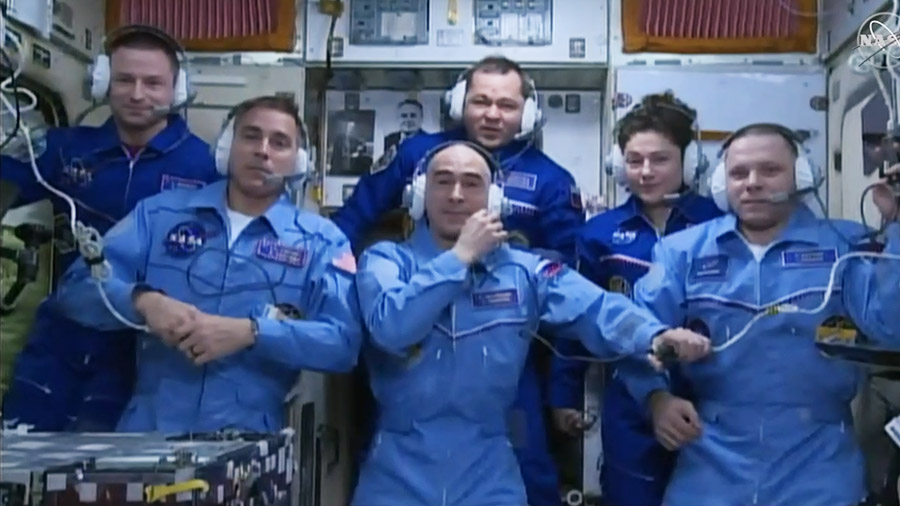
Expedition 62, following the arrival of Soyuz MS-16

During Expedition 63, Vagner and his two crewmates were scheduled to be on board the ISS for the arrival of a number of visiting crewed vehicles. The Expedition 63 crew welcomed the Crew Dragon Demo-2 mission for a stay on board the station on 31 May 2020. This flight marked the first crewed test flight of SpaceX Crew Dragon spacecraft and the first crewed orbital spacecraft to launch from US soil since STS-135, the final flight of the Space Shuttle program, in 2011. The mission was crewed by NASA astronauts Doug Hurley and Robert Behnken, who remained on board the ISS for two months. Expedition 63 was joined by Russian cosmonauts Sergey Ryzhikov and Sergey Kud-Sverchkov, as well as NASA astronaut Kathleen Rubins, who launched aboard Soyuz MS-17 on 14 October 2020.

Vagner trained as the backup Soyuz MS-25 commander.

== Awards ==
On 5 April 2022, Vagner was awarded the title Hero of the Russian Federation.
