= Soyuz MS-17 =

2020 Russian crewed spaceflight to the ISS

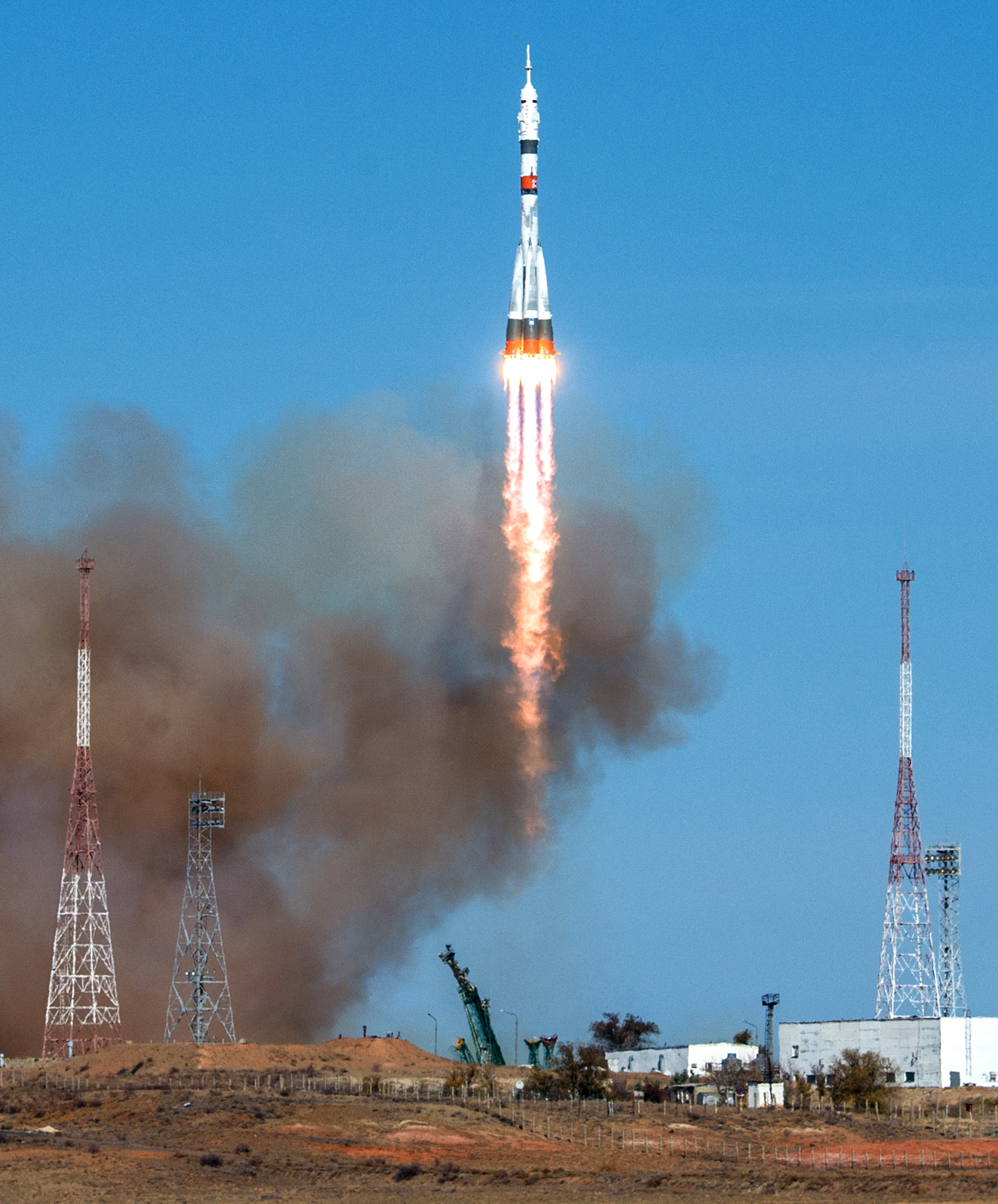
- Favor launches atop a Soyuz-2.1a
- Names: ISS 63S
- Mission type: ISS crew transport
- Operator: Roscosmos
- COSPAR ID: 2020-072A
- SATCAT no.: 46613
- Mission duration: 184 days, 23 hours and 10 minutes

Spacecraft properties
- Spacecraft: Soyuz MS-17 No. 747
- Spacecraft type: Soyuz MS
- Manufacturer: Energia

Crew
- Members: Sergey Ryzhikov; Sergey Kud-Sverchkov; Kathleen Rubins
- Callsign: Фавор (Favor)

Start of mission
- Launch date: 14 October 2020, 05:45:04 UTC
- Rocket: Soyuz-2.1a No. Х15000-045
- Launch site: Baikonur, Site 31/6
- Contractor: RKTs Progress

End of mission
- Landing date: 17 April 2021, 04:55:07 UTC
- Landing site: Kazakh Steppe, 155 km (96 mi) southeast of Jezkazgan (47°19′32″N 69°39′35″E)

Orbital parameters
- Reference system: Geocentric orbit
- Regime: Low Earth orbit
- Inclination: 51.66°

Docking with ISS
- Docking port: Rassvet nadir
- Docking date: 14 October 2020, 08:48:43 UTC
- Undocking date: 19 March 2021, 16:38:27 UTC
- Time docked: 156 days, 7 hours and 49 minutes

Docking with ISS (relocation)
- Docking port: Poisk zenith
- Docking date: 19 March 2021, 17:12:35 UTC
- Undocking date: 17 April 2021, 01:34:04 UTC
- Time docked: 28 days, 8 hours and 21 minutes
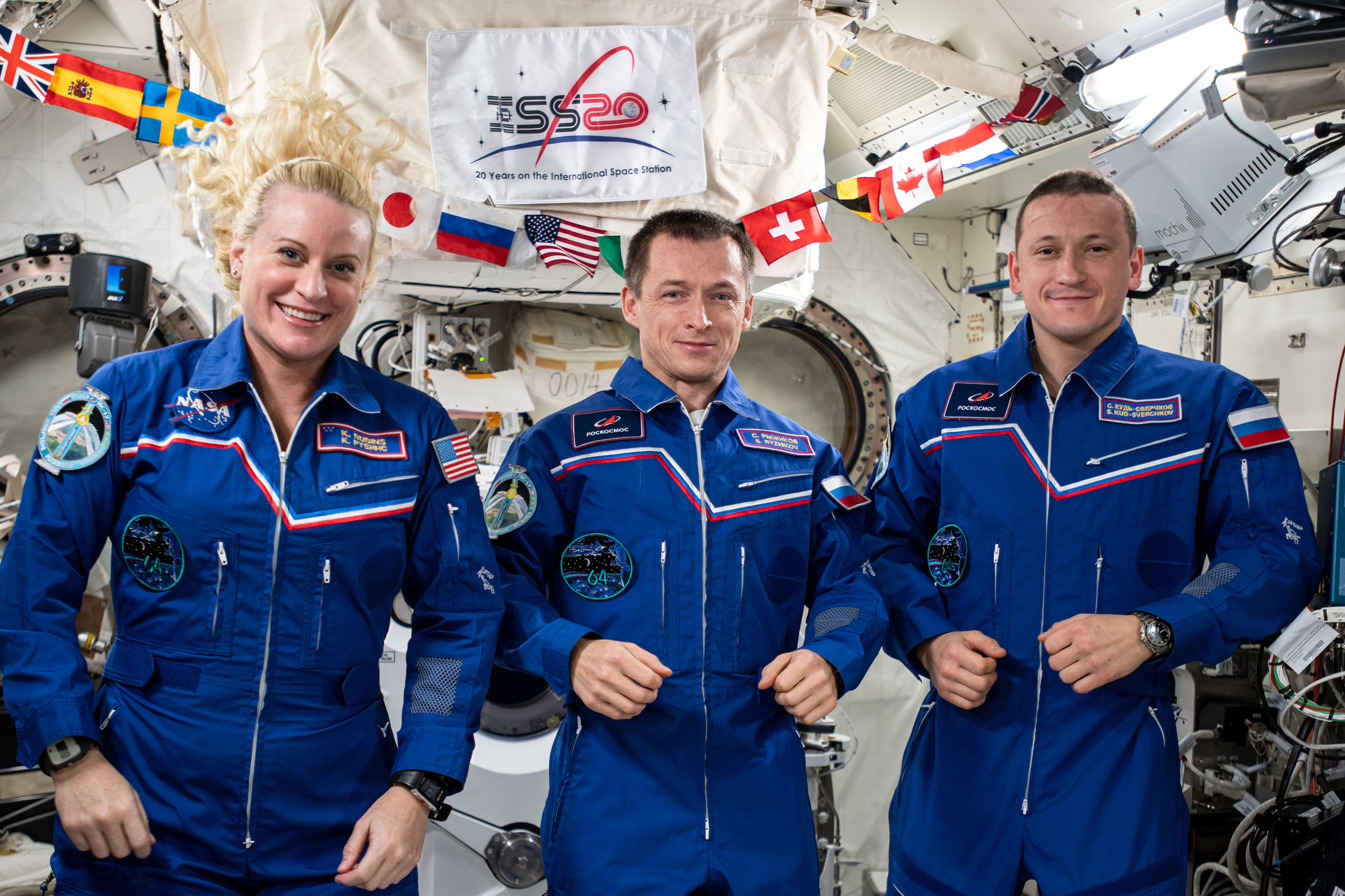
- Mission patch From left: Rubins, Ryzhikov and Kud‑Sverchkov Soyuz programme

Soyuz MS-17 was a Soyuz spaceflight that was launched on 14 October 2020. It transported three crew members of the Expedition 63/64 crew to the International Space Station. Soyuz MS-17 was the 145th crewed flight of a Soyuz spacecraft. The crew consisted of a Russian commander and a Russian and American flight engineer.

The mission marked the first use of a new "ultrafast" two-orbit rendezvous flight plan with the Soyuz, which saw Soyuz MS-17 arrive at the ISS within approximately three hours of the launch.

On 19 March 2021, the crew of Soyuz MS-17 boarded their spacecraft to relocate it from Rassvet to Poisk to make way for the arrival and docking of the Soyuz MS-18 spacecraft, which launched on 9 April 2021 carrying cosmonauts Oleg Novitsky, Pyotr Dubrov and NASA astronaut, Mark T. Vande Hei to the ISS ahead of a six-month stay. The two spacecraft had a nine-day handover period before Soyuz MS-17 departed. This is necessary to avoid de-crewing the Russian Orbital Segment (ROS) of the ISS since no Russian cosmonaut was present aboard SpaceX Crew-1.

== Crew ==
Position	Crew member
Commander	Sergey Ryzhikov, Roscosmos; Expedition 63/64; Second spaceflight
Flight engineer	Sergey Kud-Sverchkov, Roscosmos; Expedition 63/64; First spaceflight
Flight engineer	Kathleen Rubins, NASA; Expedition 63/64; Second and last spaceflight

=== Backup crew ===
Position	Crew member
Commander	Oleg Novitsky, Roscosmos
Flight engineer	Pyotr Dubrov, Roscosmos
Flight engineer	Mark T. Vande Hei, NASA

=== Reserve crew ===
Position	Crew member
Commander	Anton Shkaplerov, Roscosmos
Flight engineer	Andrei Babkin, Roscosmos

== Crew notes ==
Early planning had listed Russian cosmonaut Nikolai Chub as the mission's flight engineer, pending a NASA decision on whether they would purchase more seats on the Soyuz. In May 2020, NASA purchased a Soyuz seat and assigned NASA astronaut Kathleen Rubins to the Flight engineer position, backed up by astronaut Mark T. Vande Hei.

Originally Russian cosmonauts Anatoli Ivanishin and Ivan Vagner were set to fly as Commander and Flight engineer respectively. In February 2020, however, the two cosmonauts were moved to the Soyuz MS-16 flight due to medical issues with the commander of Soyuz MS-16, Nikolai Tikhonov. Ivanishin and Vagner were replaced by Ryzhikov and Kud-Sverchkov. Babkin remains an active cosmonaut, but has not yet been to space, while Tikhonov has retired from Roscosmos' astronaut corps.

Reacting to the COVID-19 pandemic, Roscosmos implemented a two-cosmonaut reserve crew to ensure the flight could go on with no delays, in the unlikely event both the prime and backup crews fall ill. It was not confirmed whether NASA planned to add an astronaut of their own to the reserve crew.

== Gallery ==
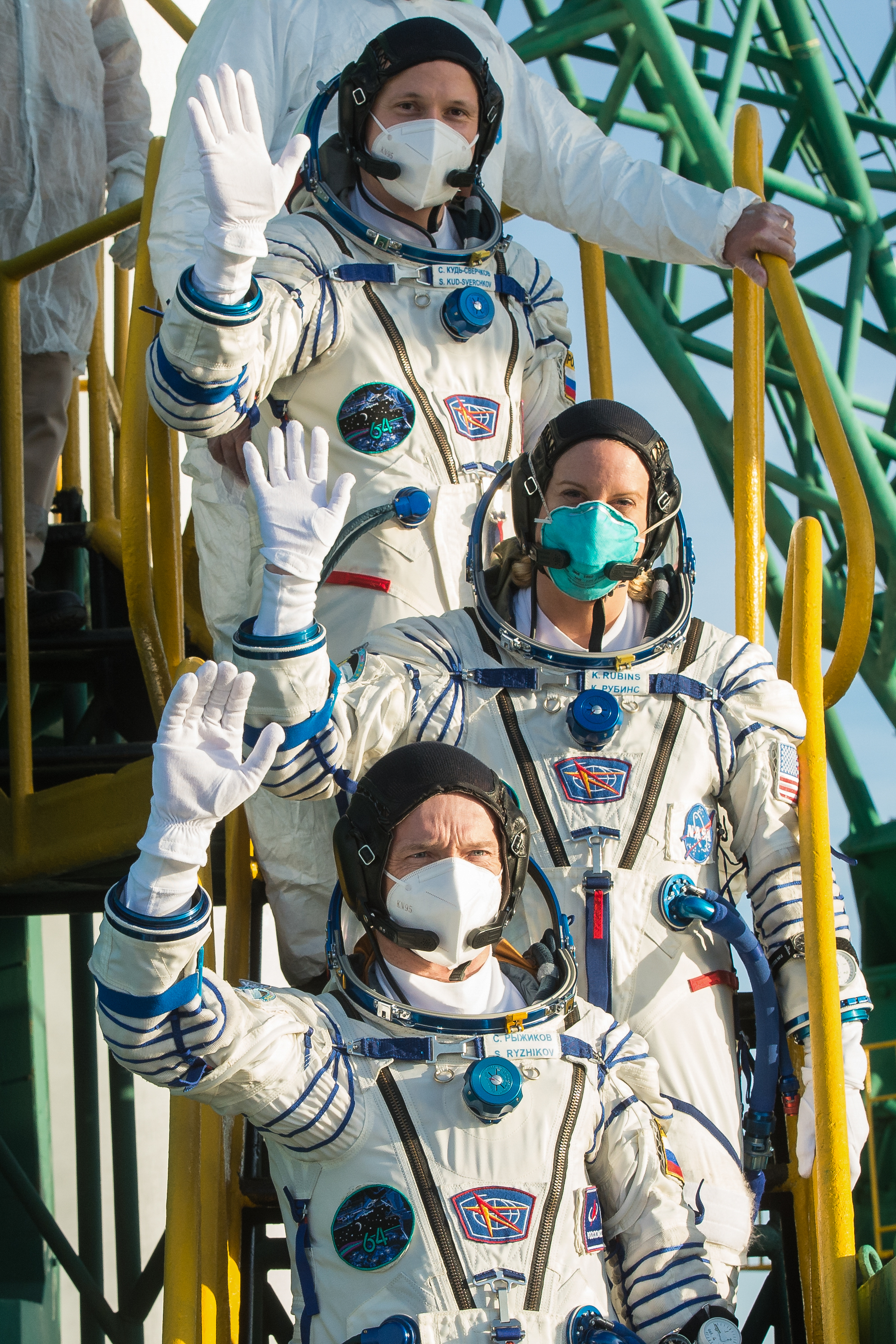

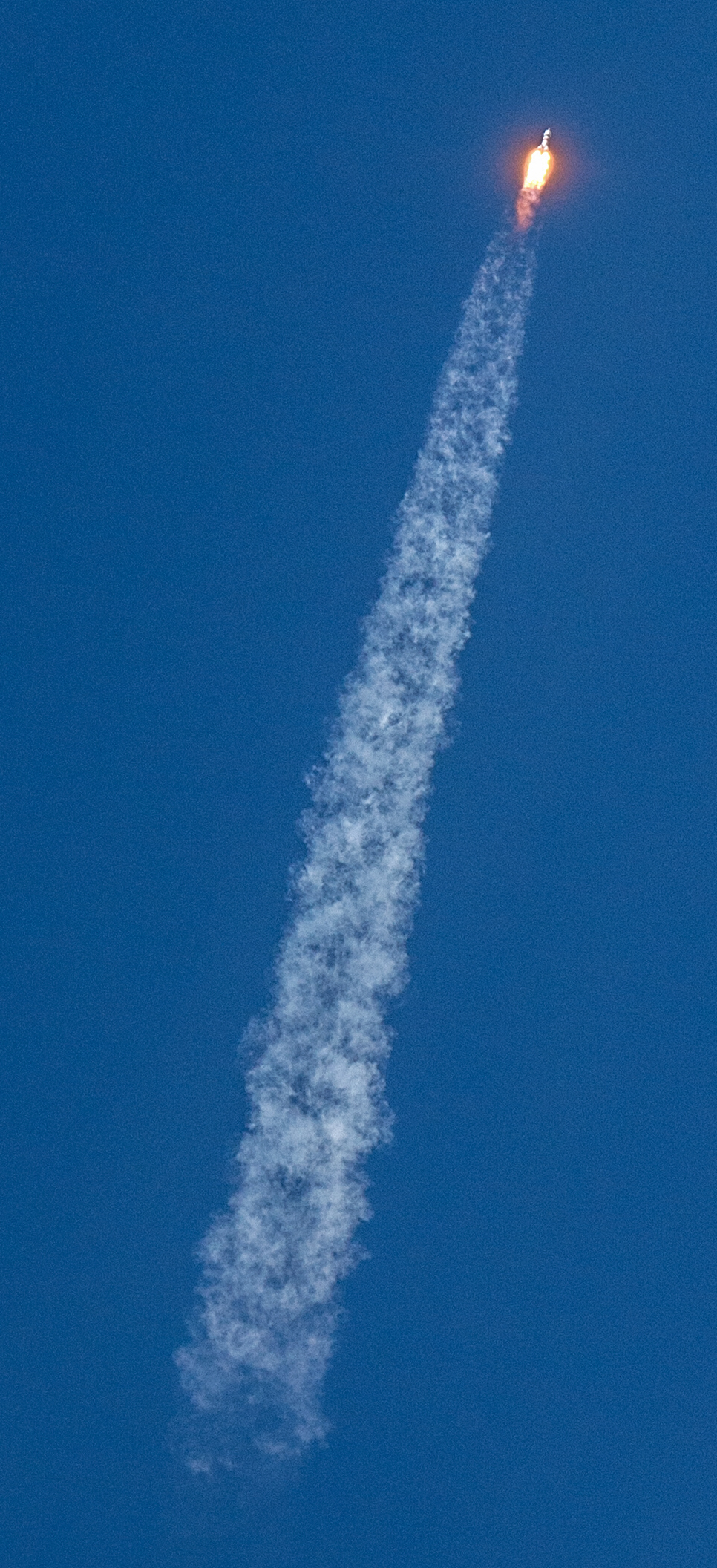
