= List of commanders of the International Space Station =

People that have commanded the ISS

This is a chronological list of commanders of the International Space Station (ISS). A pre-decided inhabitant of the ISS assumes command upon departure of the previous commander, at the end of an expedition, in a small hand-over ceremony. Their responsibility is defined by the ISS Code of Conduct, which states that the ISS commander has some authority over the operations of the ISS, but should ultimately defer most decisions to the Flight Director.

A typical ISS commander handover ceremony from Expedition 57 to 58

The commander keeps a symbolic key of the station with them during their tenure, that is, a copy of the handle opening the hatches to the Russian segment. It is passed on to a new astronaut when they replace the existing commander as the new station commander.

== Responsibilities ==
- Conduct operations in or on the ISS as directed by the Flight Director and in accordance with the Flight Rules, plans and procedures
- Direct the activities of the ISS crewmembers as a single, integrated team to ensure the successful completion of the mission
- Fully and accurately inform the Flight Director, in a timely manner, of the ISS vehicle configuration, status, commanding, and other operational activities on-board (including off-nominal or emergency situations)
- Enforce procedures for the physical and information security of operations and utilization data
- Maintain order
- Ensure crew safety, health and well-being including crew rescue and return
- Take all reasonable action necessary for the protection of the ISS elements, equipment, or payloads

== Ceremony ==
A ceremony occurs at each change of command, similar to rituals in various military services. The new and old commanders together ring a bell. The first occurred when Yury V. Usachev of Expedition 2 replaced Expedition 1 commander William M. Shepherd.

== List ==
Expedition	Patch	Portrait	Commander	Assumed command	Relinquished command	Notes (while in command of the expedition)
Expedition 1			(United States) William M. Shepherd	31 October 2000	19 March 2001	First commander of the ISS and also first American commander of the ISS.
Expedition 2			(Russia) Yury Usachev	19 March 2001	18 August 2001	First Russian commander of ISS.
Expedition 3			(United States) Frank Culbertson	18 August 2001	13 December 2001	Only American onboard ISS during September 11 attacks.
Expedition 4			(Russia) Yury Onufrienko	13 December 2001	10 June 2002	
Expedition 5			(Russia) Valery Korzun	10 June 2002	30 November 2002	
Expedition 6			(United States) Kenneth Bowersox	30 November 2002	4 May 2003	Commanded the ISS while the Columbia disaster happened.
Expedition 7			(Russia) Yuri Malenchenko	4 May 2003	27 October 2003	First person to marry in space.
Expedition 8			(United States) (United Kingdom) Michael Foale	27 October 2003	26 April 2004	
Expedition 9			(Russia) Gennady Padalka	26 April 2004	22 October 2004	
Expedition 10			(United States) Leroy Chiao	22 October 2004	24 April 2005	First Asian-American commander of ISS.
Expedition 11			(Russia) Sergei K. Krikalev	24 April 2005	10 October 2005	
Expedition 12			(United States) William S. McArthur	10 October 2005	7 April 2006	
Expedition 13			(Russia) Pavel Vinogradov	7 April 2006	27 September 2006	
Expedition 14			(United States) Michael López-Alegría	27 September 2006	17 April 2007	
Expedition 15			(Russia) Fyodor Yurchikhin	17 April 2007	19 October 2007	
Expedition 16			(United States) Peggy Whitson	19 October 2007	17 April 2008	First female commander of ISS.
Expedition 17			(Russia) Sergei Volkov	17 April 2008	22 October 2008	Youngest person to command the station at 35.
Expedition 18			(United States) Michael Fincke	22 October 2008	2 April 2009	
Expedition 19			(Russia) Gennady Padalka	2 April 2009	9 October 2009	Second time as commander.
Expedition 20			(Russia) Gennady Padalka	2 April 2009	9 October 2009	Second time as commander.
Expedition 21			(Belgium) Frank De Winne	9 October 2009	1 December 2009	First Belgian national as commander, first ESA astronaut as commander, and first non-American or non-Russian commander.
Expedition 22			(United States) Jeffrey N. Williams	1 December 2009	17 March 2010	
Expedition 23			(Russia) Oleg Kotov	17 March 2010	2 June 2010	
Expedition 24			(Russia) Aleksandr Skvortsov	2 June 2010	22 September 2010	
Expedition 25			(United States) Douglas H. Wheelock	22 September 2010	24 November 2010	
Expedition 26			(United States) Scott J. Kelly	24 November 2010	13 March 2011	
Expedition 27			(Russia) Dmitri Kondratyev	13 March 2011	22 May 2011	
Expedition 28			(Russia) Andrei Borisenko	22 May 2011	14 September 2011	
Expedition 29			(United States) Mike Fossum	14 September 2011	20 November 2011	
Expedition 30			(United States) Dan Burbank	20 November 2011	25 April 2012	
Expedition 31			(Russia) Oleg Kononenko	25 April 2012	1 July 2012	
Expedition 32			(Russia) Gennady Padalka	1 July 2012	15 September 2012	Third time as commander.
Expedition 33			(United States) Sunita Williams	15 September 2012	17 November 2012	
Expedition 34			(United States) Kevin A. Ford	17 November 2012	13 March 2013	
Expedition 35			(Canada) Chris Hadfield	13 March 2013	13 May 2013	First Canadian national as commander.
Expedition 36			(Russia) Pavel Vinogradov	13 May 2013	9 September 2013	Second time as commander.
Expedition 37			(Russia) Fyodor Yurchikhin	9 September 2013	10 November 2013	Second time as commander.
Expedition 38			(Russia) Oleg Kotov	10 November 2013	9 March 2014	Second time as commander.
Expedition 39			(Japan) Koichi Wakata	9 March 2014	12 May 2014	First Japanese national as commander.
Expedition 40			(United States) Steven R. Swanson	12 May 2014	9 September 2014	
Expedition 41			(Russia) Maksim Surayev	9 September 2014	10 November 2014	
Expedition 42			(United States) Barry E. Wilmore	10 November 2014	10 March 2015	
Expedition 43			(United States) Terry W. Virts, Jr.	10 March 2015	10 June 2015	
Expedition 44			(Russia) Gennady Padalka	10 June 2015	5 September 2015	Fourth time as commander; set the record for most time spent in space (878 days) until Oleg Kononenko surpassed him on February 4, 2024.
Expedition 45			(United States) Scott Kelly	5 September 2015	29 February 2016	Second time as commander.
Expedition 46			(United States) Scott Kelly	5 September 2015	29 February 2016	Second time as commander.
Expedition 47			(United States) Timothy L. Kopra	29 February 2016	17 June 2016	
Expedition 48			(United States) Jeffrey Williams	17 June 2016	5 September 2016	Second time as commander.
Expedition 49			(Russia) Anatoli Ivanishin	5 September 2016	28 October 2016	
Expedition 50			(United States) Robert S. Kimbrough	28 October 2016	9 April 2017	
Expedition 51			(United States) Peggy A. Whitson	9 April 2017	1 June 2017	Second time as commander.
Expedition 52			(Russia) Fyodor Yurchikhin	1 June 2017	1 September 2017	Third time as commander.
Expedition 53			(United States) Randolph J. Bresnik	1 September 2017	13 December 2017	
Expedition 54			(Russia) Alexander Misurkin	13 December 2017	26 February 2018	
Expedition 55			(Russia) Anton Shkaplerov	26 February 2018	1 June 2018	
Expedition 56			(United States) Andrew Feustel	1 June 2018	4 October 2018	
Expedition 57			(Germany) Alexander Gerst	4 October 2018	18 December 2018	First German national and second youngest person to command the station at 42.
Expedition 58			(Russia) Oleg Kononenko	18 December 2018	24 June 2019	Second time as commander.
Expedition 59			(Russia) Oleg Kononenko	18 December 2018	24 June 2019	Second time as commander.
Expedition 60			(Russia) Aleksey Ovchinin	24 June 2019	2 October 2019	
Expedition 61			(Italy) Luca Parmitano	2 October 2019	6 February 2020	First Italian national as commander.
Expedition 62			(Russia) Oleg Skripochka	6 February 2020	15 April 2020	
Expedition 63			(United States) Chris Cassidy	15 April 2020	20 October 2020	
Expedition 64			(Russia) Sergey Ryzhikov	20 October 2020	15 April 2021	
Expedition 65			(United States) Shannon Walker	15 April 2021	27 April 2021	Shortest term as commander at 11 days.
Expedition 65			(Japan) Akihiko Hoshide	27 April 2021	4 October 2021	
Expedition 65			(France) Thomas Pesquet	4 October 2021	8 November 2021	First French national as commander.
Expedition 66			(France) Thomas Pesquet	4 October 2021	8 November 2021	
Expedition 66			(Russia) Anton Shkaplerov	8 November 2021	29 March 2022	Second time as commander.
Expedition 67			(United States) Thomas Marshburn	29 March 2022	4 May 2022	
Expedition 67			(Russia) Oleg Artemyev	4 May 2022	28 September 2022	
Expedition 68			(Italy) Samantha Cristoforetti	28 September 2022	12 October 2022	First European female as commander.
Expedition 68			(Russia) Sergey Prokopyev	12 October 2022	26 September 2023	Longest continuous tenure as commander at 349 days.
Expedition 69			(Russia) Sergey Prokopyev	12 October 2022	26 September 2023	
Expedition 70			(Denmark) Andreas Mogensen	26 September 2023	10 March 2024	First Danish national as commander.
Expedition 70			(Russia) Oleg Kononenko	10 March 2024	22 September 2024	Third time as commander.
Expedition 71			(Russia) Oleg Kononenko	10 March 2024	22 September 2024	
Expedition 72			(United States) Sunita Williams	22 September 2024	7 March 2025	Second time as commander.
Expedition 72			(Russia) Aleksey Ovchinin	7 March 2025	18 April 2025	Second time as commander.
Expedition 73			(Japan) Takuya Onishi	18 April 2025	5 August 2025	
Expedition 73			(Russia) Sergey Ryzhikov	5 August 2025	7 December 2025	Second time as commander.
Expedition 74			(United States) Michael Fincke	7 December 2025	12 January 2026	Second time as commander.
Expedition 74			(Russia) Sergey Kud-Sverchkov	12 January 2026	25 July 2026	
Expedition 75			(United States) Jessica Meir	25 July 2026	4 October 2026	
Expedition 75			(Russia) Pyotr Dubrov	4 October 2026	April 2027 (planned)	

== Statistics ==
A Russian national has commanded the station 36 times. A US national has commanded the station 32 times. (Note: Including dual-national Michael Foale) A Japanese national has commanded the station thrice. Italian nationals have commanded the station twice. Belgian, British, Canadian, Danish, German, and French nationals have commanded the station once each.

Gennady Padalka has commanded the station on four separate occasions, more than any other inhabitant.

Fyodor Yurchikhin and Oleg Kononenko have commanded the station thrice. Scott Kelly, Oleg Kotov, Anton Shkaplerov, Pavel Vinogradov, Peggy Whitson, Jeffrey Williams, Sunita Williams, Aleksey Ovchinin, Sergey Ryzhikov, and Michael Fincke have commanded the station twice each.

== See also ==
- List of International Space Station expeditions
- List of human spaceflights to the International Space Station
- List of Soyuz missions
- Uncrewed spaceflights to the International Space Station
- List of Mir expeditions
