= Expedition 64 =

Long-duration mission to the International Space Station

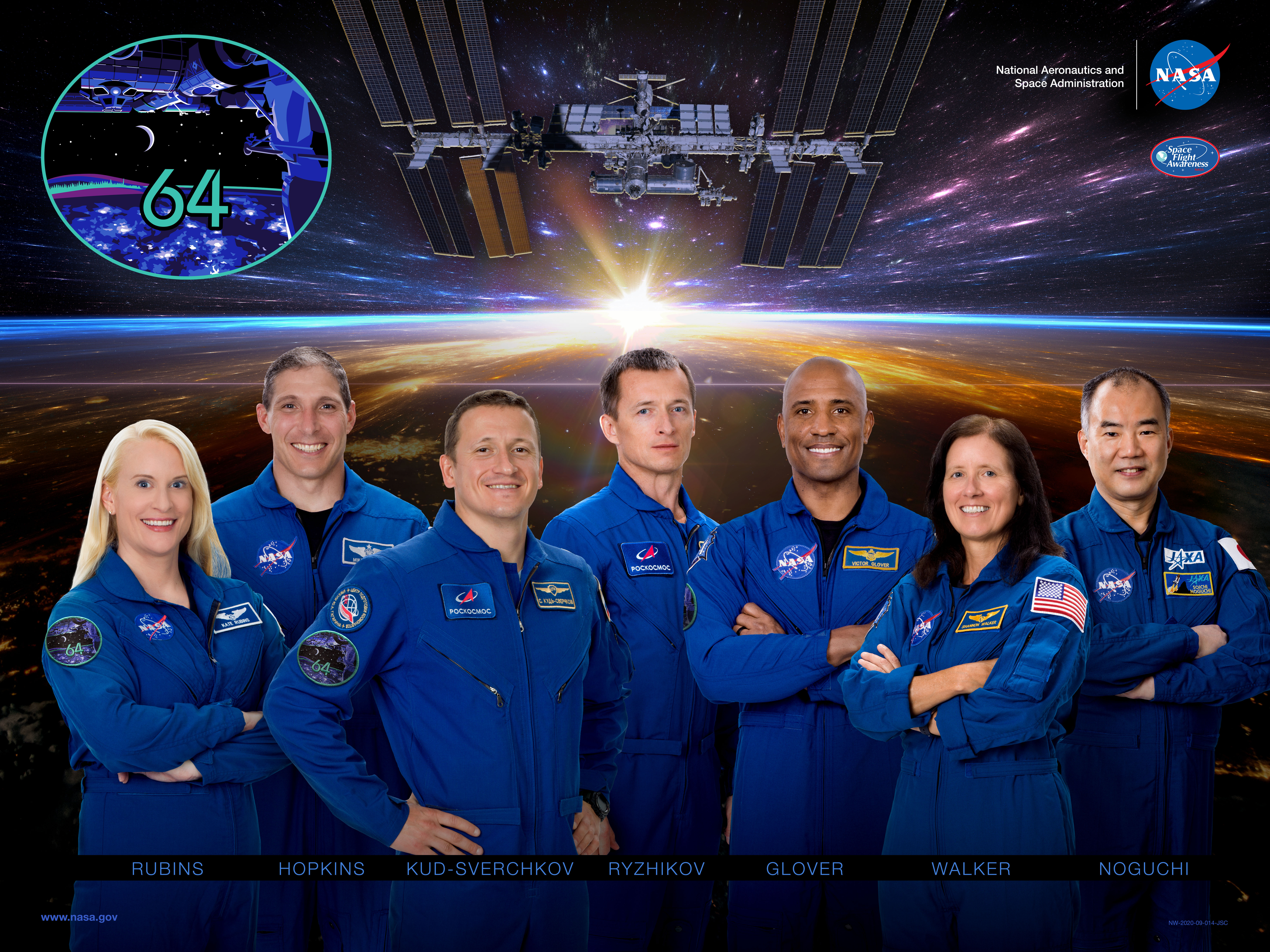
- Promotional Poster
- Mission type: Long-duration expedition
- Operator: NASA / Roscosmos
- Mission duration: 177 days, 2 hours and 1 minute

Expedition
- Space station: International Space Station
- Began: 21 October 2020, 23:32:09 UTC
- Ended: 17 April 2021, 01:34:04 UTC
- Arrived aboard: Soyuz MS-17; SpaceX Crew-1; Soyuz MS-18
- Departed aboard: Soyuz MS-17

Crew
- Crew size: 3-10
- Members: Expedition 63/64: Sergey Ryzhikov; Sergey Kud-Sverchkov; Kathleen Rubins; Expedition 64/65: Mike Hopkins; Victor Glover; Soichi Noguchi; Shannon Walker; Oleg Novitsky; Expedition 64/65/66: Pyotr Dubrov; Mark T. Vande Hei
- EVAs: 6
- EVA duration: 39 hours, 51 minutes
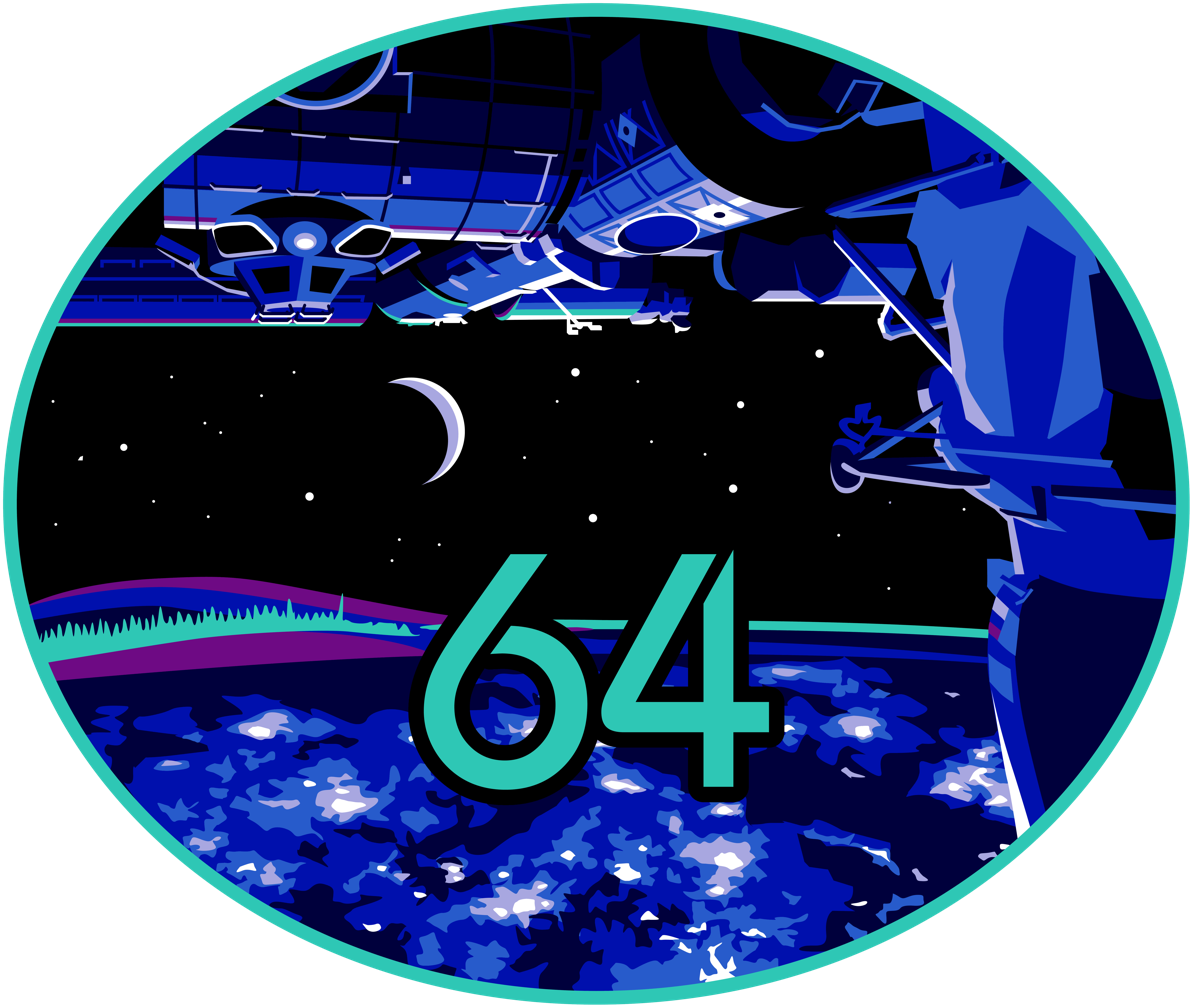
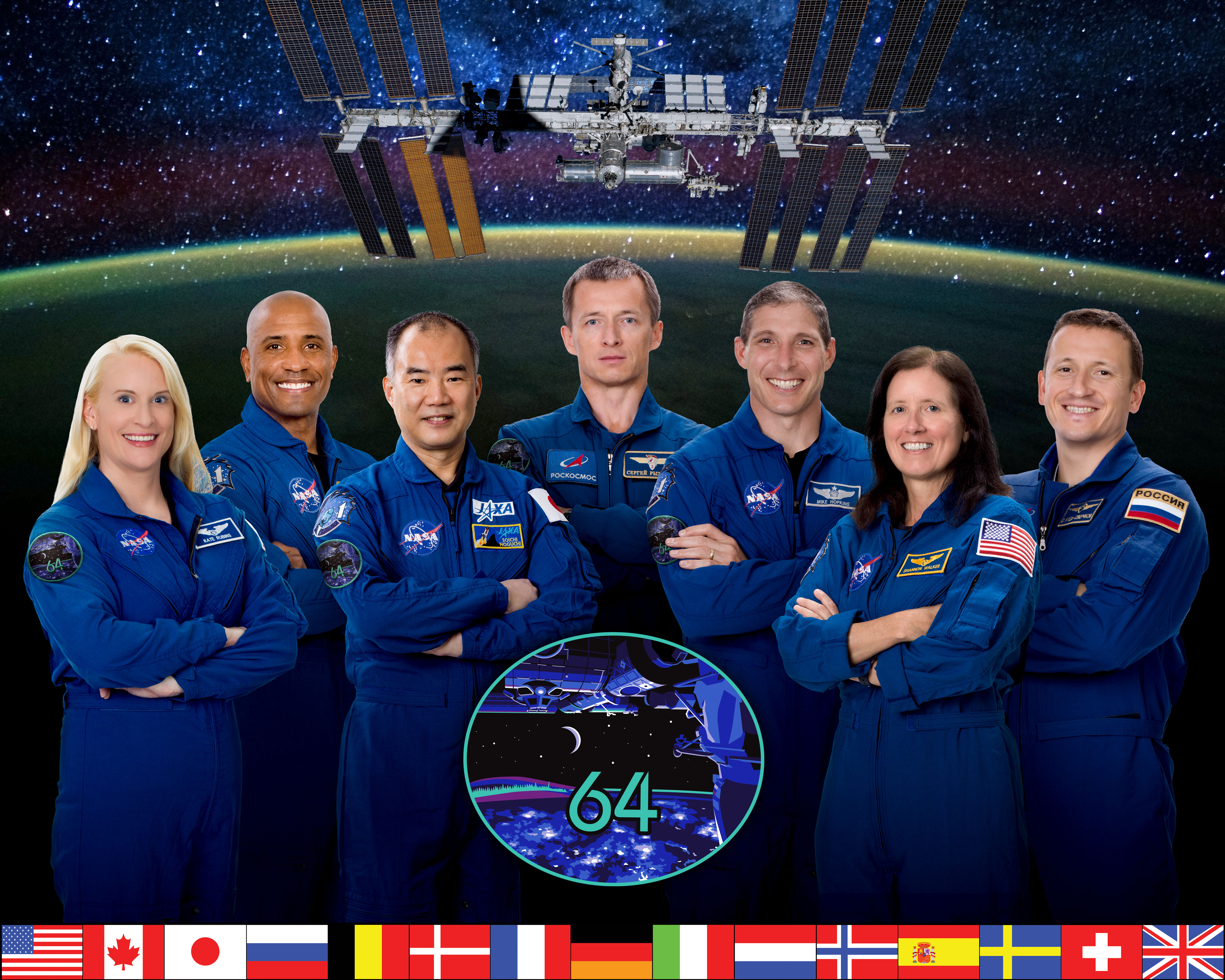
- Expedition 64 mission patch Expedition 64 crew portrait ISS expeditions

Expedition 64 was the 64th long-duration expedition to the International Space Station. The mission began on 21 October 2020 with the undocking and departure of Soyuz MS-16 and ended on 17 April 2021 with the departure of Soyuz MS-17.

== Background, crew, and events ==
The expedition started with the three person crew who launched onboard Soyuz MS-17 featuring ISS commander Sergey Ryzhikov and Sergey Kud-Sverchkov of Roscosmos, as well as NASA astronaut Kathleen Rubins.

On 17 November 2020, the crew reached its full complement with the arrival of SpaceX Crew-1, the first operational flight of NASA's Commercial Crew Program (CCP), featuring NASA astronauts Mike Hopkins, Victor Glover, and Shannon Walker, as well as JAXA astronaut Soichi Noguchi. As Crew-1 consisted of a crew of four instead of three like the Soyuz, this marked the beginning of operations for crews of seven on the ISS.

In the final week of the mission, Soyuz MS-18 and its three-person crew featuring Roscosmos cosmonauts Oleg Novitsky and Pyotr Dubrov, as well as NASA astronaut Mark T. Vande Hei joined the mission.

== Events manifest ==
Events involving crewed spacecraft are listed in bold.

Previous mission: Expedition 63

- 21 October 2020 - **Soyuz MS-16 undocking, official switch from Expedition 63**
- 17 November 2020 - **SpaceX Crew-1 docking**
- 18 November 2020 - EVA 1 (VKD-45) Ryzhikov/Kud-Sverchkov: 6 hrs, 48 mins
- 7 December 2020 - CRS SpX-21 docking
- 6 January 2021 - CRS NG-14 unberthing and release
- 12 January 2021 - CRS SpX-21 undocking
- 27 January 2021 - EVA 2 (US-69) Hopkins/Glover: 6 hrs, 56 mins
- 1 February 2021 - EVA 3 (US-70) Hopkins/Glover: 5 hrs, 20 mins
- 9 February 2021 - Progress MS-15/76P undocking
- 17 February 2021 - Progress MS-16/77P docking
- 22 February 2021 - CRS NG-15 capture and berthing
- 28 February 2021 - EVA 4 (US-71) Rubins/Glover: 7 hrs, 4 mins
- 5 March 2021 - EVA 5 (US-72) Rubins/Noguchi: 6 hrs, 56 mins
- 13 March 2021 - EVA 6 (US-73) Glover/Hopkins: 6 hrs, 47 mins
- 19 March 2021 - **Soyuz MS-17 redocking**
- 5 April 2021 - **SpaceX Crew-1 redocking**
- 9 April 2021 - **Soyuz MS-18 docking**
- 15 April 2021 - ISS Expedition 64/65 change of command ceremony from Sergey Ryzhikov to Shannon Walker
- 17 April 2021 - **Soyuz MS-17 docking, official switch to Expedition 65**

Next mission: Expedition 65

== Crew ==
Flight	Astronaut	First part (21 October – 17 November 2020)	Second part (17 November 2020 – 9 April 2021)	Third part (9 – 17 April 2021)
Soyuz MS-17	Sergey Ryzhikov, Roscosmos; Second spaceflight	Commander		
Soyuz MS-17	Sergey Kud-Sverchkov, Roscosmos; First spaceflight	Flight engineer		
Soyuz MS-17	Kathleen Rubins, NASA; Second and last spaceflight	Flight engineer		
SpaceX Crew-1	Mike Hopkins, NASA; Second and last spaceflight	Off station	Flight engineer	
SpaceX Crew-1	Victor Glover, NASA; First spaceflight	Off station	Flight engineer	
SpaceX Crew-1	Soichi Noguchi, JAXA; Third and last spaceflight	Off station	Flight engineer	
SpaceX Crew-1	Shannon Walker, NASA; Second and last spaceflight	Off station	Flight engineer	
Soyuz MS-18	Oleg Novitsky, Roscosmos; Third spaceflight	Off station		Flight engineer
Soyuz MS-18	Pyotr Dubrov, Roscosmos; First spaceflight	Off station		Flight engineer
Soyuz MS-18	Mark T. Vande Hei, NASA; Second spaceflight	Off station		Flight engineer

== Extravehicular activity ==
Several spacewalks for Expedition 63 were planned to carry out work on the scientific and power systems on the ISS. Delays to the NASA Commercial Crew Program left Chris Cassidy as the only crew member on the US Orbital Segment (USOS) for an extended period of time. The arrival of the Crew Dragon Demo-2 mission permitted four EVAs by Cassidy and Robert Behnken to replace the remaining nickel-hydrogen batteries on the S6 Truss with new lithium-ion batteries.

The planned work for activating the Bartolomeo scientific package located on the outside of the Columbus laboratory module, delivered on SpaceX CRS-20, was postponed until Expedition 64.

Ryzhikov and Kud-Sverchkov performed a spacewalk on 18 November 2020 to conduct initial preparations for the replacement of the Pirs docking compartment by the Nauka laboratory module, which lasted 6 hours and 48 minutes. This was the first EVA to be conducted from the Poisk airlock. Coverage of the spacewalk, which NASA has designated "Russian Spacewalk #47", began at 14:30 UTC and lasted more than six hours.

During late January through early March 2021, NASA executed five spacewalks. The 27 January spacewalk, begun at 12:28 UTC and lasting 6 hours and 56 minutes, was conducted by Hopkins and Glover to install a Ka band antenna on Columbus in preparation for Bartolomeo's activation, replace a pin on the Quest Joint Airlock, and remove a grapple fixture on the P4 Truss for the beginning of a series of experimental solar array wing upgrades.

The 1 February spacewalk, begun at 12:56 UTC and lasting 5 hours and 20 minutes, was conducted by Hopkins and Glover to conclude a four-year campaign, initiated by Shane Kimbrough and Peggy Whitson on Expedition 50, to replace the batteries on the Integrated Truss Structure. Hopkins and Glover also installed and upgraded several cameras on the starboard truss, the Destiny laboratory, and the Kibo robotic arm.

The 28 February spacewalk, begun at 11:12 UTC and lasting 7 hours and 4 minutes, was conducted by Rubins and Glover to install on the P6 Truss brackets for the experimental solar array upgrades, the main materials for which launched in June 2021 aboard SpaceX CRS-22.

The 5 March spacewalk, begun at 11:37 UTC and lasting 6 hours and 56 minutes, was conducted by Rubins and Noguchi to continue the bracket installation work. They had also initially planned to deploy a new airlock cover to strengthen Quest, replace a wireless video transceiver on the Unity node, route more cables on Bartolomeo, and vent and rearrange ammonia hoses. Rubins and Noguchi abandoned the planned additional work because they encountered difficulties with several bolts during the bracket installation.

The 13 March spacewalk, begun at 13:14 UTC and lasting 6 hours and 47 minutes, was conducted by Hopkins and Glover to finish the work not taken up by Rubins and Noguchi, although they deferred installing clamps on Bartolomeo to a future spacewalk.
