= Expedition 63 =

Long-duration mission to the International Space Station

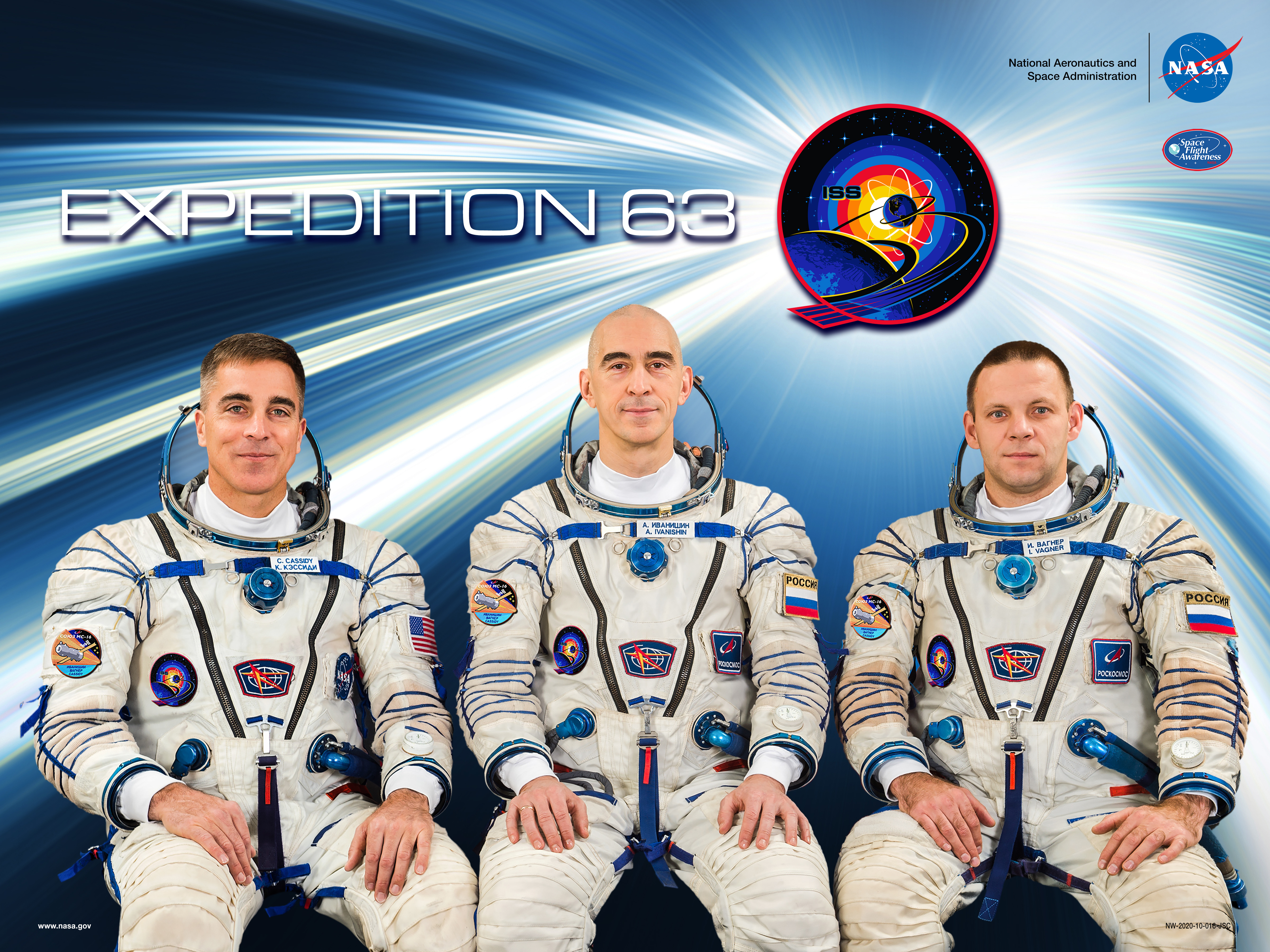
- Promotional Poster (without Demo-2 crew)
- Mission type: Long-duration expedition
- Mission duration: 187 days, 21 hours and 38 minutes

Expedition
- Space station: International Space Station
- Began: 17 April 2020, 01:53:30 UTC
- Ended: 21 October 2020, 23:32:09 UTC
- Arrived aboard: Soyuz MS-16; Crew Dragon Demo-2; Soyuz MS-17
- Departed aboard: Crew Dragon Demo-2; Soyuz MS-16

Crew
- Crew size: 3-6 (cumulative total: 8)
- Members: Expedition 62/63: Anatoli Ivanishin; Ivan Vagner; Chris Cassidy; Expedition 63: Doug Hurley; Bob Behnken; Expedition 63/64: Sergey Ryzhikov; Sergey Kud-Sverchkov; Kathleen Rubins
- EVAs: 4
- EVA duration: 23 hours 37 minutes
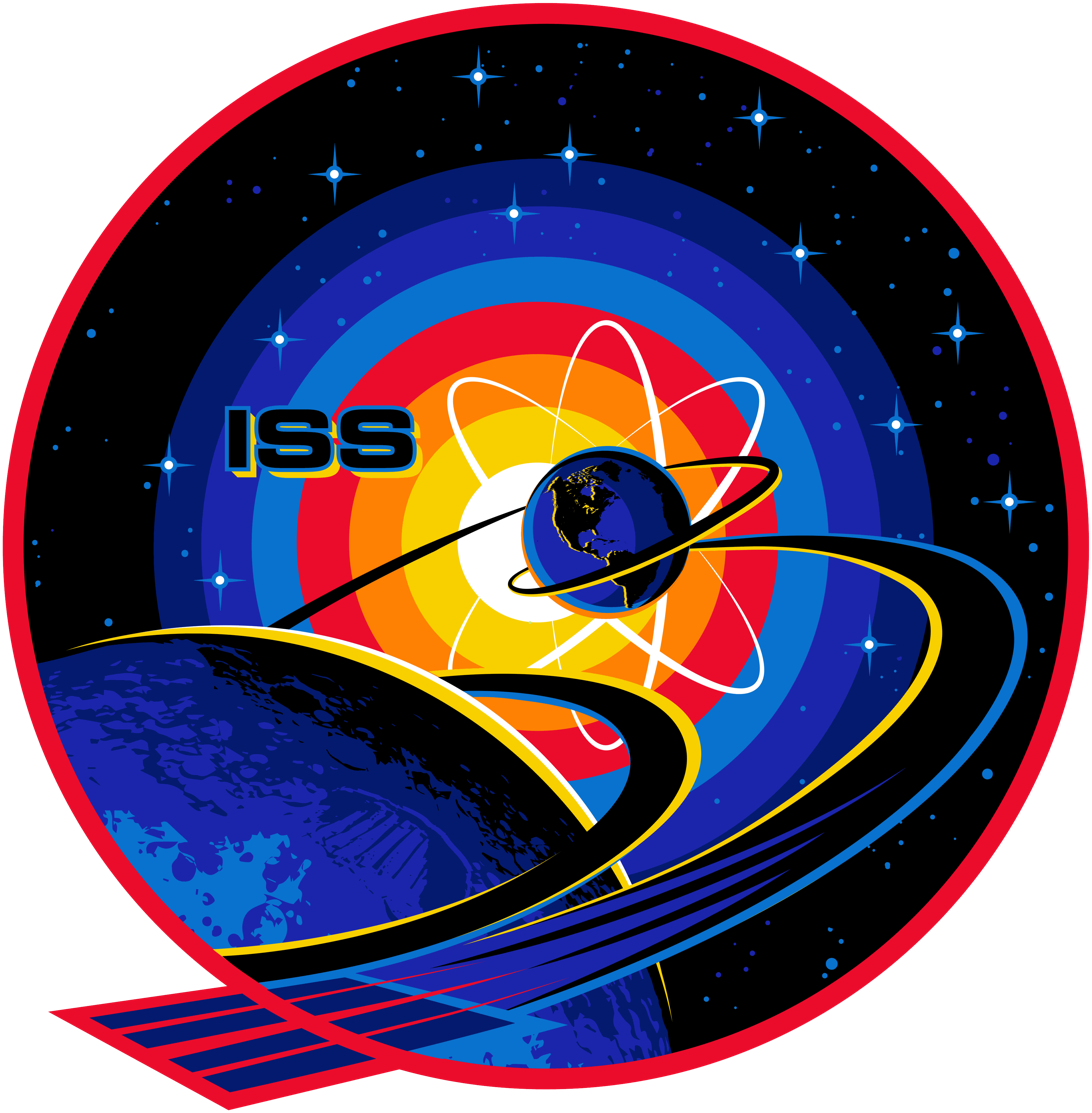
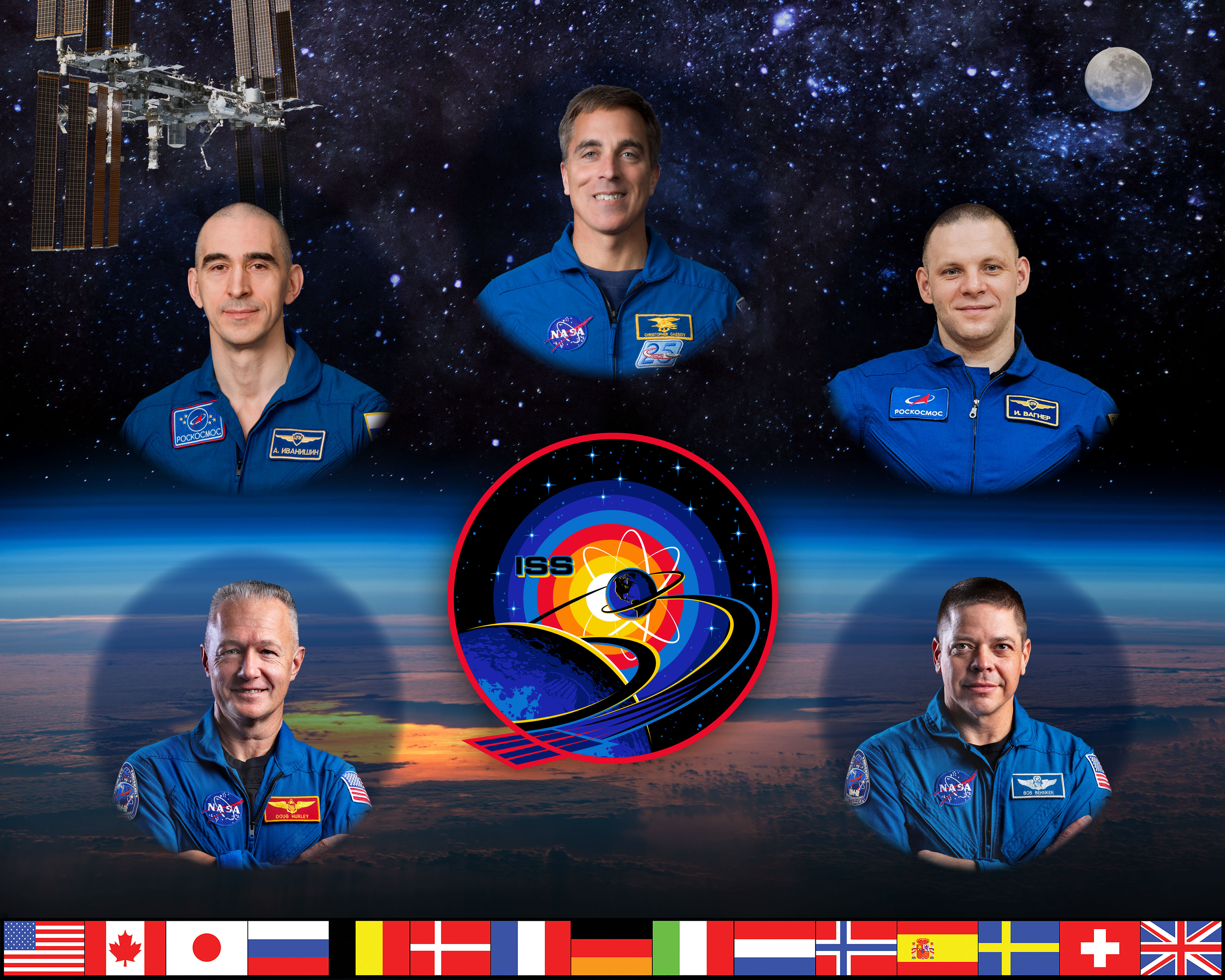
- Expedition 63 mission patch Up: Roscosmos cosmonaut Anatoli Ivanishin, NASA astronaut Chris Cassidy, Roscosmos cosmonaut Ivan Vagner (Soyuz MS-16), and down: NASA astronauts Doug Hurley and Bob Behnken (Crew Dragon Demo-2) ISS expeditions

Expedition 63 was the 63rd long-duration mission to the International Space Station. The expedition began on 17 April 2020 with the undocking of Soyuz MS-15 and continued until the undocking of Soyuz MS-16 on 21 October 2020, an unusual double-length expedition increment.

== Background, Crew, and Events ==
The expedition initially consisted of American commander Chris Cassidy, as well as Russian flight engineers Anatoli Ivanishin and Ivan Vagner.

On 31 May 2020, the expedition welcomed the Crew Dragon Demo-2 crew, the first crewed flight of SpaceX's Crew Dragon spacecraft named Endeavour after the eponymous Space Shuttle vehicle. The mission's two crew members Doug Hurley and Bob Behnken of NASA undocked from the ISS on 1 August 2020 to help bolster research on the station and participate in several spacewalks outside of the station.

On 14 October 2020, Soyuz MS-17 and its crew members Sergey Ryzhikov and Sergey Kud-Sverchkov of Roscosmos, as well as NASA astronaut Kathleen Rubins joined the expedition.

== Events manifest ==
Events involving crewed spacecraft are listed in bold.

Previous mission: Expedition 62

- 17 April 2020 - **Soyuz MS-15 undocking, official switch from Expedition 62**
- 25 April 2020 - Progress MS-14/75P docking
- 11 May 2020 - CRS NG-13 unberthing and release
- 25 May 2020 - HTV-9 capture and berthing
- 31 May 2020 - **SpaceX Demo-2 docking**
- 26 June 2020 - EVA 1 (US-65) Cassidy/Behnken: 6 hrs, 7 mins
- 1 July 2020 - EVA 2 (US-66) Cassidy/Behnken: 6 hrs, 1 min
- 8 July 2020 - Progress MS-13/74P undocking
- 16 July 2020 - EVA 3 (US-67) Behnken/Cassidy: 6 hrs
- 21 July 2020 - EVA 4 (US-68) Behnken/Cassidy: 5 hrs, 29 mins
- 23 July 2020 - Progress MS-15/76P docking
- 1 August 2020 - **SpaceX Demo-2 undocking**
- 18 August 2020 - HTV-9 unberthing and release
- 5 October 2020 - CRS NG-14 capture and berthing
- 14 October 2020 - **Soyuz MS-17 docking**
- 20 October 2020 - ISS Expedition 63/64 change of command ceremony from Chris Cassidy to Sergey Ryzhikov
- 21 October 2020 - **Soyuz MS-16 undocking, official switch to Expedition 64**

Next mission: Expedition 64

== Crew ==
Flight	Astronaut	First part (17 April – 31 May 2020)	Second part (31 May – 1 August 2020)	Third part (1 August – 14 October 2020)	Fourth part (14–21 October 2020)
Soyuz MS-16	Anatoli Ivanishin, Roscosmos; Third and last spaceflight	Flight engineer			
Soyuz MS-16	Ivan Vagner, Roscosmos; First spaceflight	Flight engineer			
Soyuz MS-16	Chris Cassidy, NASA; Third and last spaceflight	Commander			
SpaceX Demo-2	Doug Hurley, NASA; Third and last spaceflight	Off station	Flight engineer	Off station	
SpaceX Demo-2	Bob Behnken, NASA; Third and last spaceflight	Off station	Flight engineer	Off station	
Soyuz MS-17	Sergey Ryzhikov, Roscosmos; Second spaceflight	Off station			Flight engineer
Soyuz MS-17	Sergey Kud-Sverchkov, Roscosmos; First spaceflight	Off station			Flight engineer
Soyuz MS-17	Kathleen Rubins, NASA; Second and last spaceflight	Off station			Flight engineer

== Crewed test flight ==
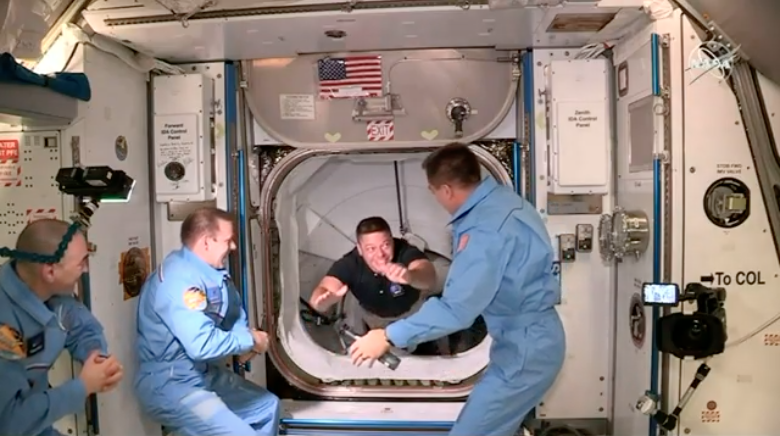
Bob Behnken enters the ISS shortly after the Crew Dragon hatch opened.

Mission	Astronauts	Docking (UTC)	Undocking (UTC)	Duration
Crew Dragon Demo-2	Doug Hurley; Bob Behnken	31 May 2020; 14:27	1 August 2020; 23:35	64 days
Crew Dragon Demo-2	SpaceX spacecraft C206, later named Endeavour in honor of the Space Shuttle orbiter, launched to the station on 30 May 2020 and docked to the station approximately 19 hours later. The flight was the first crewed test flight of SpaceX's Crew Dragon spacecraft and the first crewed spaceflight to launch from the United States since STS-135 in July 2011. The flight was originally planned as a two-week test flight, but crew members Doug Hurley and Bob Behnken stayed aboard the station for approximately two months.			

== Extravehicular activity ==
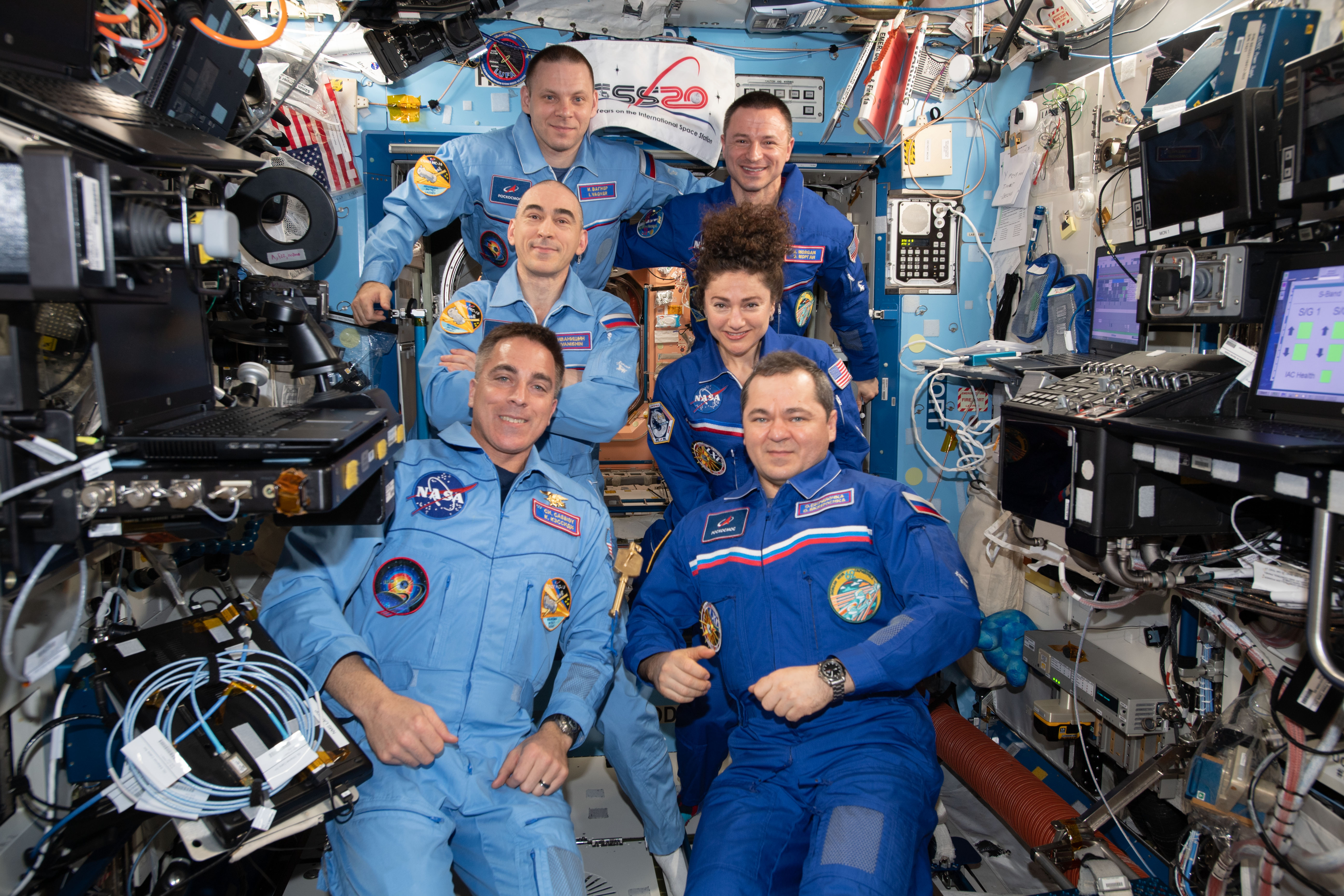
The Expedition 62 and 63 crews pose together moments after Oleg Skripochka handed over ISS command to Chris Cassidy.

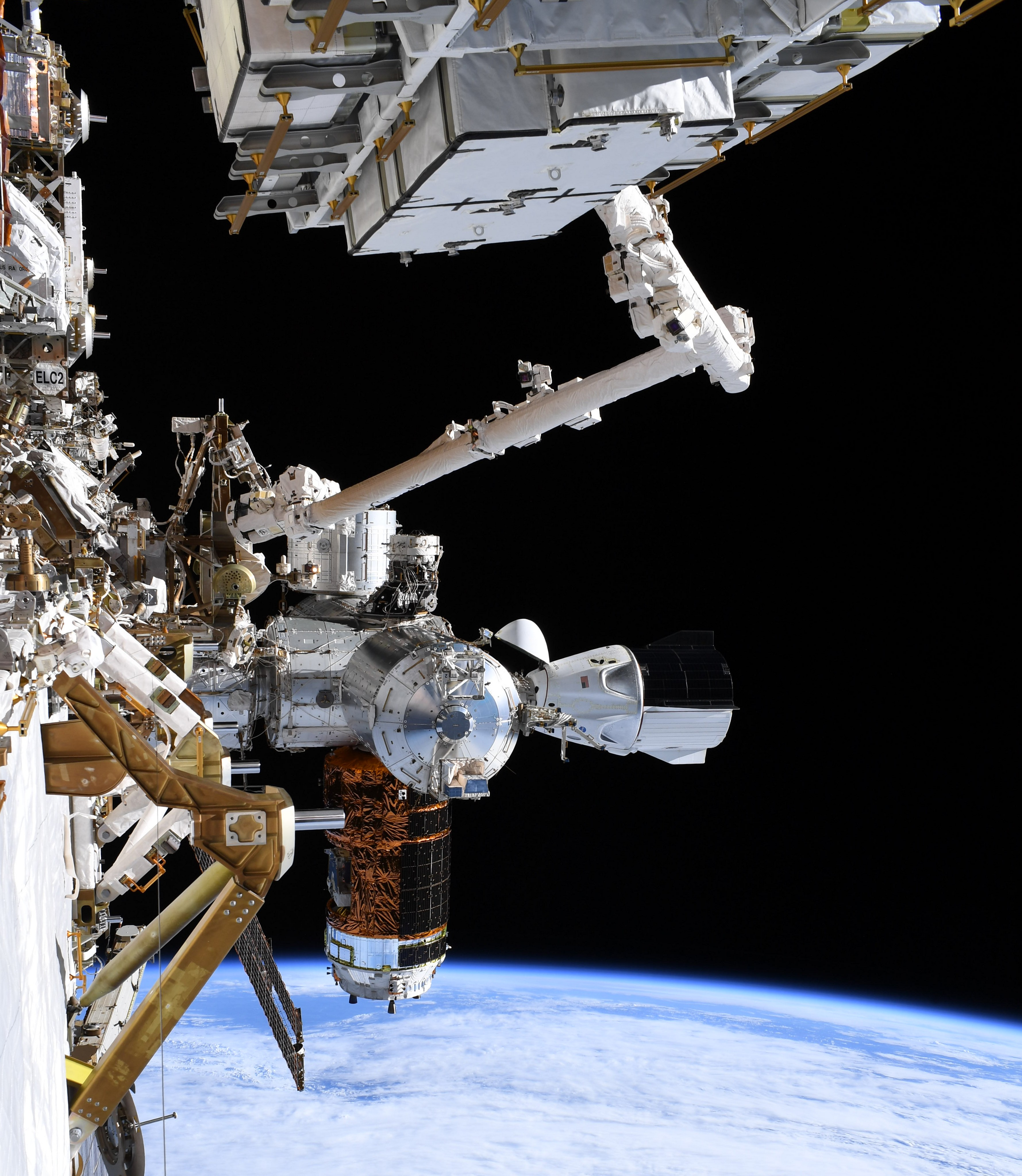
On 26 June 2020, spacewalkers Behnken and Cassidy completed the first of four scheduled spacewalks.

Since delays to the NASA Commercial Crew Program could have left Cassidy as the only crew member on the US Orbital Segment (USOS) for an extended period of time, Anatoli Ivanishin carried out training on American Extravehicular Mobility Unit (EMU) spacesuits. In the unlikely event that an unscheduled EVA had to take place before any more USOS crew members arrived on the station, if Ivanishin had taken part in an EVA in the EMU, he would have been the first Russian cosmonaut to use an EMU since Yuri Malenchenko (who performed the EVA with NASA Astronaut Peggy Whitson) during Expedition 16 in 2007. For the same reason, Vagner has had to train on the USOS Robotic Arm (Canadarm2) in order to robotically support any spacewalk carried out by Cassidy and Ivanishin. With the flight of Crew Dragon Demo-2 being extended to approximately 65 days, NASA astronauts Doug Hurley and Bob Behnken were trained to carry out any EVAs alongside Cassidy if the need arose. During any excursions, Cassidy and Behnken would perform the EVAs with Hurley supporting the spacewalk robotically from inside the station.

Several spacewalks were planned to carry out work on the scientific and power systems on the ISS. This includes work activating the Bartolomeo scientific package located on the outside of the Columbus laboratory module, which was delivered on CRS-20 earlier in the year. NASA revealed on 19 May 2020 that with Demo-2 plans solidified, they were now planning as many as five EVAs by Cassidy and Behnken to install Bartolomeo and replace the remaining nickel-hydrogen batteries on the S6 Truss with new lithium-ion batteries.

On 26 June 2020, Expedition 63's first spacewalk, American spacewalk 65, began at 11:32 UTC with Cassidy and Behnken. The two NASA astronauts concluded their spacewalk at 17:39 UTC, after six hours and seven minutes. The two NASA astronauts completed all the work planned for this first of four spacewalks: to replace batteries that provide power for the station's solar arrays on the starboard truss of the complex, as well as initial tasks originally planned for the second scheduled spacewalk on 1 July 2020. The new batteries provide an improved and more efficient power capacity for operations. The spacewalkers removed five of six aging nickel-hydrogen batteries for one of two power channels for the starboard 6 (S6) truss, installed two of three new lithium-ion batteries, and installed two of three associated adapter plates that are used to complete the power circuit to the new batteries. Mission control reports that the two new batteries are working.

On 1 July 2020, American spacewalk 66 began at 11:13 UTC with astronauts Cassidy and Behnken. The two NASA astronauts concluded their spacewalk at 17:14 UTC, after six hours and one minute. The two NASA astronauts completed half the work to upgrade the batteries that provide power for one channel on one pair of the station's solar arrays. They moved and connected one new lithium-ion battery to complete the circuit to the new battery and relocated one nickel-hydrogen battery to an external platform for future disposal. They also loosened the bolts on nickel-hydrogen batteries that will be replaced to complete the power capability upgrade on the far starboard truss and complete the station's battery replacement work that began in January 2017.

On 16 July 2020, American spacewalk 67 began at 11:10 UTC with astronauts Cassidy and Behnken. The two NASA astronauts concluded their spacewalk at 17:10 UTC, after six hours. The two NASA astronauts completed all the work to replace batteries that provide power for the station’s solar arrays on the starboard truss of the complex. They removed six aging nickel-hydrogen batteries for the second of two power channels for the starboard 6 (S6) truss, installed three new lithium-ion batteries, and installed the three associated adapter plates that are used to complete the power circuit to the new batteries. The work nearly completes a 3.5-year effort to upgrade the International Space Station’s power system. At completion, 24 new lithium-ion batteries and adapter plates will replace 48 aging nickel-hydrogen batteries. In April 2019, one of the newly installed lithium-ion batteries on the near port truss blew a fuse, so two nickel-hydrogen batteries were re-installed to take its place. A new replacement lithium-ion battery arrived to the space station in January 2020 aboard the SpaceX Dragon on its 19th commercial resupply services mission and is stowed on the station’s truss until it can be installed during a future spacewalk later this year.

On 21 July 2020, American spacewalk 68 began at 11:12 UTC with astronauts Cassidy and Behnken. The two NASA astronauts concluded their spacewalk at 16:41 UTC, after five hours and 29 minutes. The two NASA astronauts installed a protective storage unit that includes two Robotic External Leak Locator (RELL) units the Canadian Space Agency’s Dextre robot can use to detect leaks of ammonia, which is used to operate the station’s cooling system. Behnken and Cassidy then removed two lifting fixtures at the base of station solar arrays on the near port truss, or backbone, of the station. The “H-fixtures” were used for ground processing of the solar arrays prior to their launch. They then completed tasks to prepare the outside of the Tranquility module for the arrival later this year of the Nanoracks commercial airlock on a SpaceX cargo delivery mission. After its installation, the airlock will enable be used to deploy commercial and government-sponsored experiments into space. They also routed Ethernet cables and removed a lens filter cover from an external camera. This was the 10th spacewalk for each astronaut, tying them with Michael Lopez-Alegria and Peggy Whitson as the only other U.S. astronauts to complete 10 spacewalks. Behnken has now spent a total of 61 hours and 10 minutes spacewalking, which makes him the U.S. astronaut with the third most total time spacewalking, behind Lopez-Alegria and Andrew Feustel, and the fourth most overall. Cassidy now has spent a total of 54 hours and 51 minutes spacewalking and is ninth on the worldwide list for total time spacewalking. Space station crew members have conducted 231 spacewalks in support of assembly and maintenance of the orbiting laboratory. Spacewalkers have now spent a total of 60 days, 12 hours, and 3 minutes working outside the station.

== Cubesat ==
On 13 July 2020, the Kibo Remote Manipulator System (RMS) removed the Nanoracks NRCSD-18 deployer from the Kibō airlock. The deployer ejected the DemMi (1998-067RP) cubesat at 13:40:25 UTC and the TechEdSat-10 (1998-067RQ) cubesat at 16:55:25 UTC. DeMi (Deformable Mirror experiment) is a 6U cubesat for DARPA and Aurora Flight Sciences. TechEdSat-10 is a 6U cubesat for Ames Research Center of the NASA and San Jose State University to test controlled reentry technology.
