= Andrei Babkin =

Russian engineer and cosmonaut

- Андре́й Ба́бкин
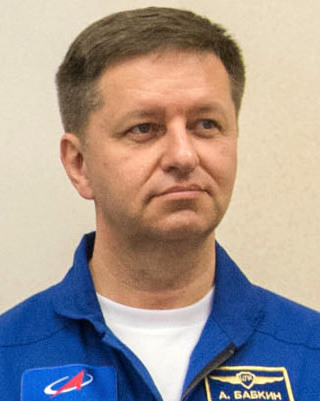
- Babkin in 2020
- Born: Andrei Nikolaevich Babkin; April 21, 1969 (age 57); Bryansk, Russia SFSR, Soviet Union
- Education: Moscow Aviation Institute
- Space career

Roscosmos cosmonaut
- Previous occupation: Engineer for Energia
- Status: Retired
- Time in space: None
- Selection: RKKE-17 Cosmonaut Group (2010)

Andrei Nikolaevich Babkin (Russian: Андре́й Никола́евич Ба́бкин) is a Russian engineer and cosmonaut who was selected in April 2010. He was scheduled to make his first flight into space in April 2020 onboard Soyuz MS-16, although in February 2020 he and Nikolai Tikhonov were removed from the flight for medical reasons. Russian media reported that based on future crew assignments, he was unlikely to ever fly into space for Roscosmos. In September 2024, he was removed from the roster of active cosmonauts.

== Early life and education ==
Babkin was born on 21 April 1969 in the city of Bryansk, Russia, he graduated secondary school in 1986 and went on to study engineering at the Bryansk Institute of Transport until 1990. He then attended the Moscow Aviation Institute, graduating in 1995 with a systems engineering degree, specializing in life support systems and aircraft protection.

He would later attend Moscov Aviation Institute again, doing a postgraduate course systems analysis, management and information processing. He graduated in 2005 and defended his thesis, "Formation of technical and ergonomic requirements for the system of means of extra-ship activity (VCA) of the crew on the surface of Mars” the following year.

== Engineering career ==
In 1997 Babkin started working as an engineer for RSC Energia, he worked on the Mir and International Space Station programs, developing new tools for use on Spacewalks on board the two stations. He then went on to lead the maintenance side of the search and recovery teams for the Soyuz spacecraft.

Later in his career at Energia, he went on to work on spacesuit development, working on the Orlan space suit. He was a trained safety diver for mock spacewalks in the Gagarin Cosmonaut Training Center hydrolaboratory. He continued to work at Energia until his selection as a cosmonaut in 2010.

== Cosmonaut career ==
Babkin was selected as a cosmonaut in April 2010 and participated in basic training from October of that year to July 2012 before becoming eligible for assignments to a long-duration flight to the International Space Station. He has completed flight training in an L-39 Albatros jet training aircraft and over 100 parachute jumps.

Babkin has so far been removed from the prime crew of three long-duration flights to the ISS, he was briefly assigned to the crew of ISS Expedition 59/60, although was removed from the flight due to crew cutbacks on the Russian Orbital Segment of the ISS caused by delays with the Nauka module. He was later assigned to fly on Expedition 61/62, although was again removed from the flight due to crew assignment changes caused by the aborted launch of Soyuz MS-10.

=== Expedition 62/63 ===
He was later assigned to the crew of Expedition 62/63, scheduled for launch on Soyuz MS-16 on 9 April 2020 alongside Russian cosmonaut Nikolai Tikhonov and NASA astronaut Christopher Cassidy. Due to delays with NASA's Commercial Crew Program leaving Cassidy as the only crew member on the US Orbital Segment for an extended period of time, Tikhonov and Babkin had to take special training on US EVA equipment in case something caused the crew to need undertake an emergency spacewalk while Cassidy was the only NASA astronaut on board the station. Babkin but was removed from the flight on 19 February 2020 due to a medical issue with Tikhnov which arose and forced his and Babkin's removal from the flight. He was moved to the flight's backup crew. Again, due medical reasons, he was replaced from the Soyuz MS-18 backup crew.
