= Sergey Ryzhikov (cosmonaut) =

Russian cosmonaut and military officer (born 1974)

- Сергей Рыжиков
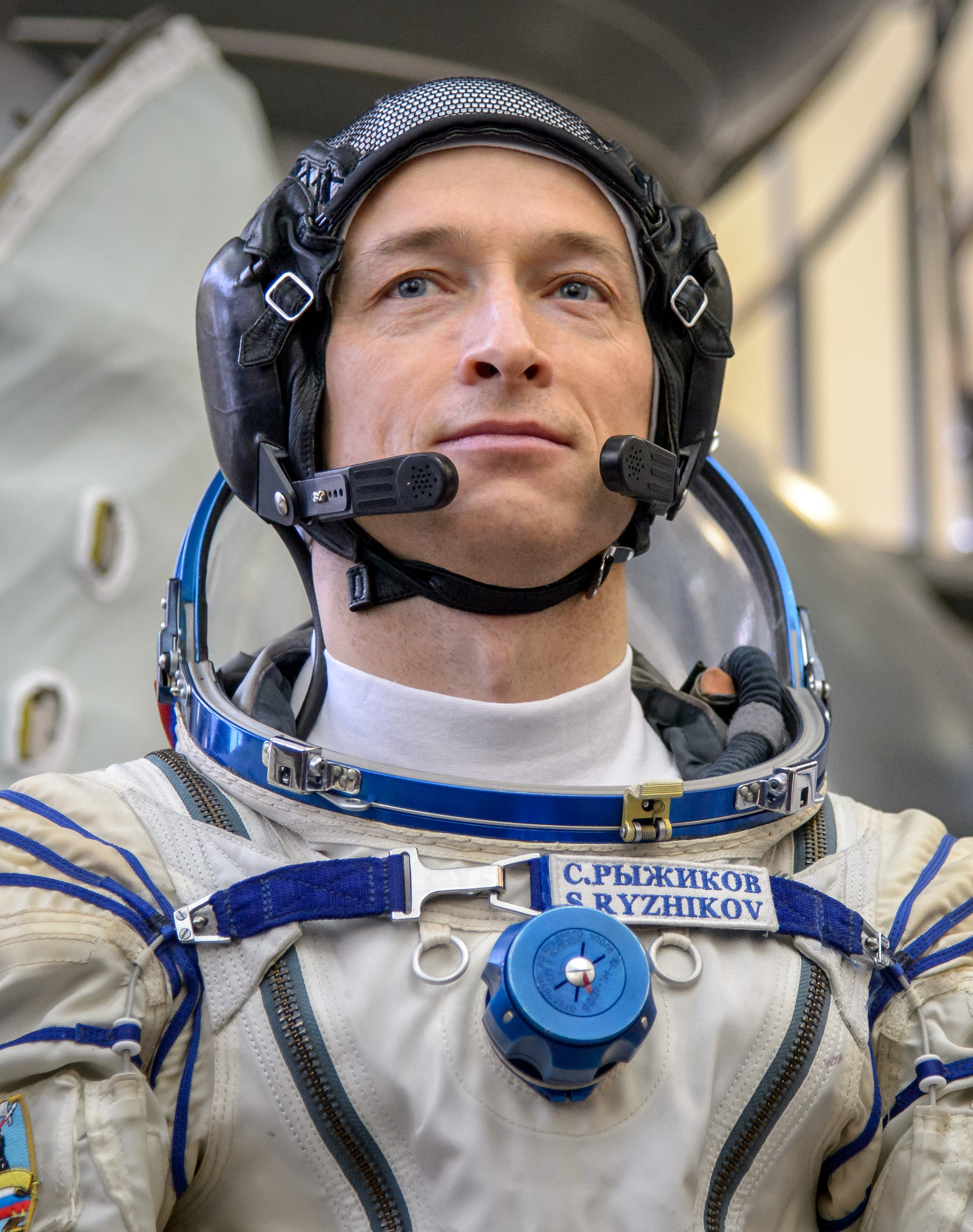
- Ryzhikov in 2016
- Born: Sergey Nikolayevich Ryzhikov; 19 August 1974 (age 52); Bugulma, Russian SFSR, Soviet Union
- Awards: Hero of the Russian Federation; Order of Merit for the Fatherland; Pilot-Cosmonaut of the Russian Federation
- Space career

Roscosmos cosmonaut
- Current occupation: Test cosmonaut
- Status: Active
- Rank: Lieutenant colonel, Russian Air Force
- Time in space: 603 days, 1 hour, and 42 minutes
- Selection: TsPK-14 Cosmonaut Group (2006)
- Total EVAs: 3
- Total EVA time: 19 hours, 51 minutes
- Missions: Soyuz MS-02 (Expedition 49/50); Soyuz MS-17 (Expedition 63/64); Soyuz MS-27 (Expedition 72/73)
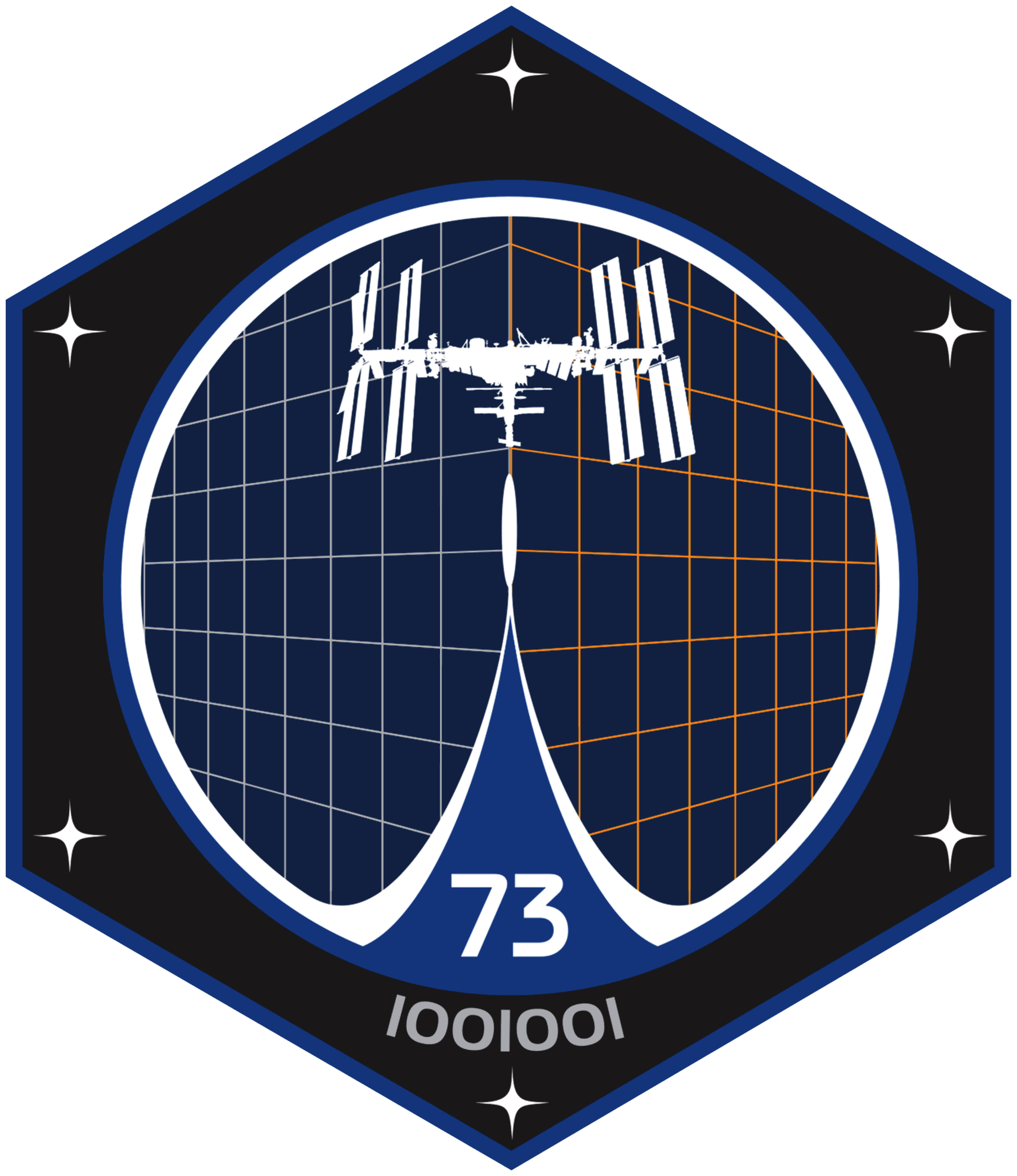
- Mission insignia

Sergey Nikolayevich Ryzhikov (Russian: Сергей Николаевич Рыжиков; born on 19 August 1974), lieutenant colonel of Russian Air Force, is a Russian cosmonaut, selected in 2006. He is a veteran of three long duration spaceflights to the ISS.

== Early life and education ==
Ryzhikov was born on 19 August 1974 in Bugulma, Tatar Autonomous Soviet Socialist Republic. He graduated from secondary school in Nizhnevartovsk, Russia in 1991 where he was part of the young aviators club. He graduated from the Kachinsky Higher Military Aviation School of Pilots in 1996 with a degree in command tactical fighter aviation.

== Military career ==
Following his graduation, Ryzhikov trained as a pilot in the Russian Air Force. In 1997, he was assigned as a pilot in the 76th Air Army, based out of Andreapol.

He has over 700 flying hours in L-39 Albatros and Mig 29 aircraft as well as holding a "parachute instructor" qualification with over 350 parachute jumps.

== Cosmonaut career ==
Ryzhikov was selected as a cosmonaut by Roscosmos in October 2006 and began training at the Yuri Gagarin Cosmonaut Training Center in Star City, Russia in February 2007. He completed training in June 2009 and became eligible for a future flight to the International Space Station.

In 2011, Ryzhikov served as cavenaut into the ESA CAVES training in Sardinia, alongside Thomas Pesquet, Tim Peake, Norishige Kanai and Randolph Bresnik.

=== Expedition 49/50 ===
In 2016, Ryzhikov served as backup commander of the Soyuz TMA-20M mission, backing up Russian cosmonaut Aleksey Ovchinin as flight engineer for ISS Expedition 47/48. Following the launch of Soyuz TMA-20M on 19 March 2016, Ryzhikov was assigned to the prime crew of ISS Expedition 49/50 as a flight engineer.

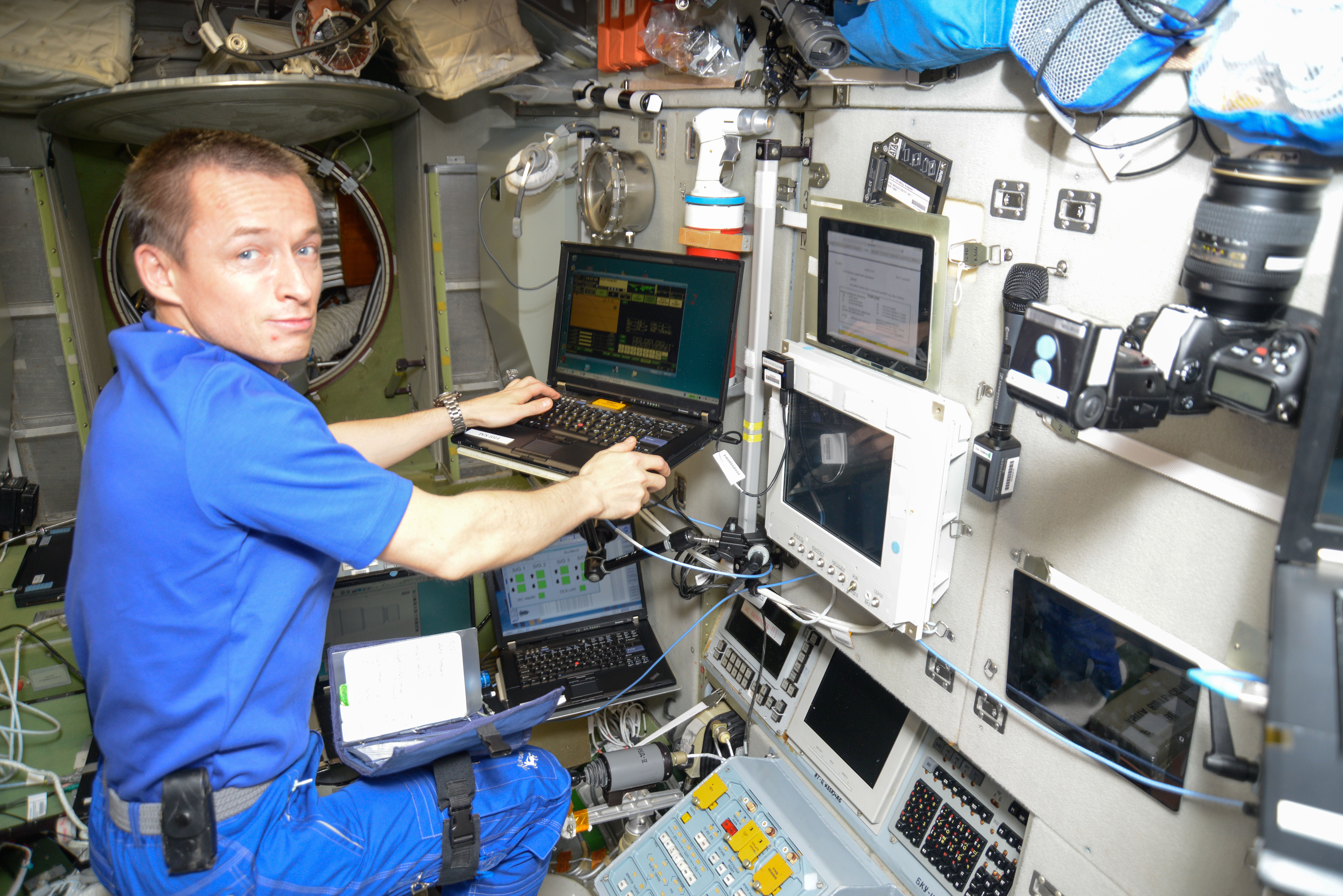
Ryzhikov at work in the Zvezda module (2016-12-20).

Ryzhikov was assigned as commander of the Soyuz MS-02 spacecraft. He and his two crewmates, Roscosmos cosmonaut Andrei Borisenko and NASA astronaut Shane Kimbrough were originally scheduled to launch on 23 September 2016 and dock to the ISS two days later, although the launch was delayed indefinitely due to technical issues with the Soyuz spacecraft. Ryzhikov and his two crewmates finally launched on 19 October 2016 and successfully docked with the ISS two days later, joining the Expedition 49 crew alongside Russian cosmonaut Anatoli Ivanishin, JAXA astronaut Takuya Onishi, and NASA astronaut Kathleen Rubins. Originally, the Expedition 49 crew were scheduled to work together as a six-person crew for two months, although due to the lengthy delay with the launch of Soyuz MS-02, Expedition 49 only spent about one week as a six-person increment, with Ivanishin, Onishi, and Rubins returning to Earth on 30 October 2016.

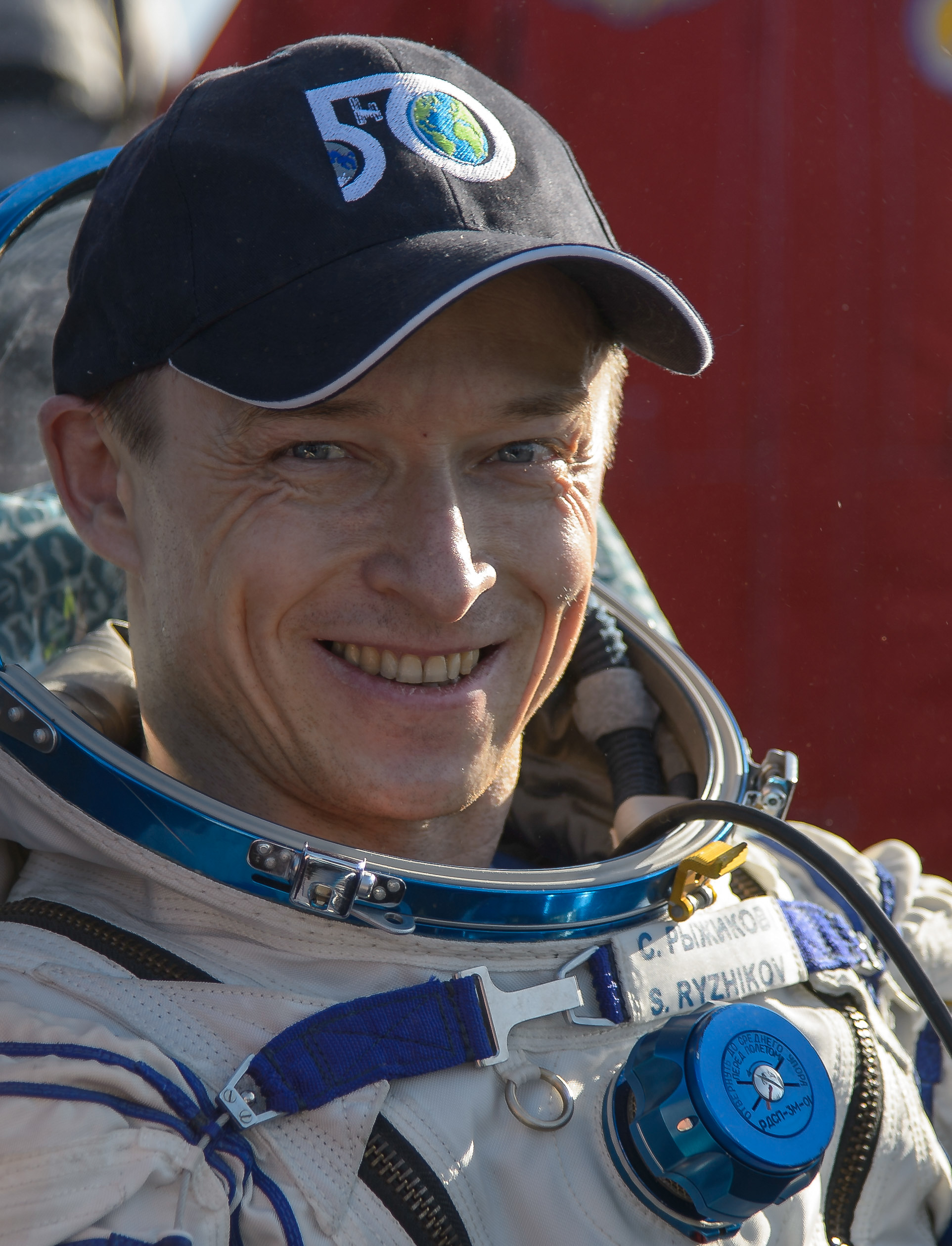
Ryzhikov following the landing of Soyuz MS-02 (2017-04-10).

Following the landing of Soyuz MS-01, Ryzhikov, Borisenko, and Kimbrough transferred over to Expedition 50, with Kimbrough taking command of the station. The trio was shortly joined by the Soyuz MS-03 spacecraft, carrying Russian cosmonaut Oleg Novitsky, ESA astronaut Thomas Pesquet, and NASA astronaut Peggy Whitson, bringing Expedition 50 up to six crew members. During Expedition 50, Ryzhikov was on board the station for four US spacewalks and observed the arrival of three uncrewed resupply spacecraft. Expedition 50 lasted until 10 April 2017, when Ryzhikov, Borisenko, and Kimbrough departed the station onboard Soyuz MS-02, starting Expedition 51 with Whitson in command. The trio landing in Kazakhstan hours after their departure from the ISS, wrapping up 173 days in space.

=== Expedition 63/64 ===
In November 2019, Ryzhikov was assigned to the backup crew of ISS Expedition 63/64, acting as stand in to Soyuz MS-17 and Expedition 63 cosmonaut Anatoli Ivanishin. He continued in that assignment until February 2020, when a medical issue with the crew of Soyuz MS-16 resulted in Ivanishin being pushed up to MS-16, resulting in Ryzhikov taking Ivanishin's place.

Ryzhikov launched from Baikonur on October 14, 2020, alongside Russian cosmonaut Sergey Kud-Sverchkov and NASA astronaut Kathleen Rubins.

On October 20, 2020, Ryzhikov became the ISS commander for Expedition 64.

On 18 November 2020, Ryzhikov, along with fellow crew member Sergey Kud-Sverchkov, conducted their first spacewalk. The spacewalk began at 15:12 UTC and finished after 6 hours and 48 minutes. The tasks were a leak tightness check for the exit hatch in Poisk, replacement of the liquid flow regulator's removable panel on Zarya (aborted because of a "bulky bolt"), work on scientific equipment, commutation of the Tranzit-B antenna on Pirs to the Poisk module (to ensure continuity of communications with the Orlan suits), and changing the position of sensors for the precipitation and pressure control unit on the Poisk module.

The MS-17 crew returned to Earth on 17 April 2021 after almost 185 days on orbit.

=== Expedition 72/73 ===
On 8 April 2025, Ryzhikov flew on Soyuz MS-27 with Alexey Zubritsky and Jonny Kim. The crew returned on 9 December 2025.

== See also ==
- List of Heroes of the Russian Federation

| Preceded by Christopher Cassidy | ISS Commander (Expedition 64); 20 October 2020 to 15 April 2021 | Succeeded by Shannon Walker |
| Preceded by Takuya Onishi | ISS Commander (Expedition 73); 5 August to 7 December 2025 | Succeeded by Michael Fincke |
