= Soyuz MS-16 =

2020 Russian crewed spaceflight to the ISS

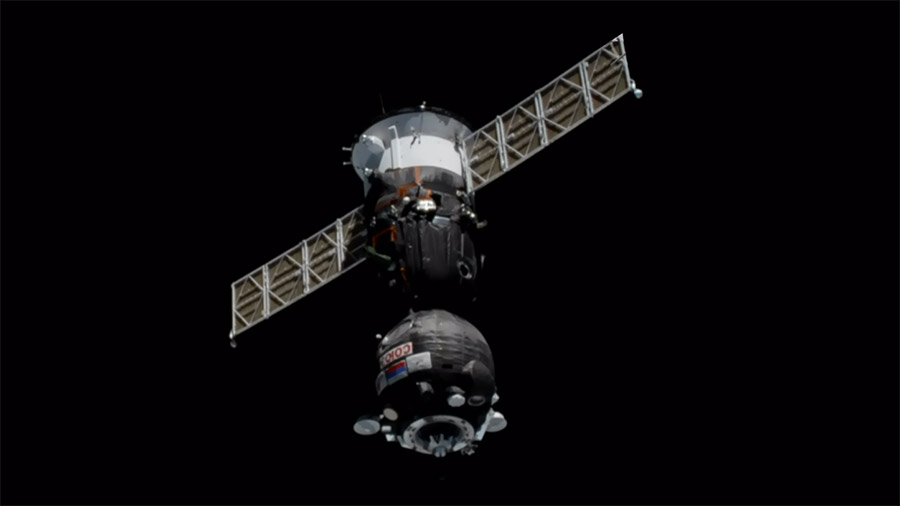
- Irkut approaches the ISS
- Names: ISS 62S
- Mission type: ISS crew transport
- Operator: Roscosmos
- COSPAR ID: 2020-023A
- SATCAT no.: 45476
- Mission duration: 195 days, 18 hours and 49 minutes

Spacecraft properties
- Spacecraft: Soyuz MS-16 No. 745
- Spacecraft type: Soyuz MS
- Manufacturer: Energia
- Launch mass: 7,280 kg (16,050 lb)

Crew
- Crew size: 3
- Members: Anatoli Ivanishin; Ivan Vagner; Christopher Cassidy
- Callsign: Irkut
- Expedition: Expedition 62/63

Start of mission
- Launch date: 9 April 2020, 08:05:06 UTC
- Rocket: Soyuz-2.1a No. B15000-042
- Launch site: Baikonur, Site 31/6
- Contractor: RKTs Progress

End of mission
- Landing date: 22 October 2020, 02:54:12 UTC
- Landing site: Kazakh Steppe, 150 km (93 mi) southeast of Zhezkazgan

Orbital parameters
- Reference system: Geocentric orbit
- Regime: Low Earth orbit
- Inclination: 51.66°

Docking with ISS
- Docking port: Poisk zenith
- Docking date: 9 April 2020, 14:13:18 UTC
- Undocking date: 21 October 2020, 23:31:41 UTC
- Time docked: 195 days, 9 hours and 18 minutes
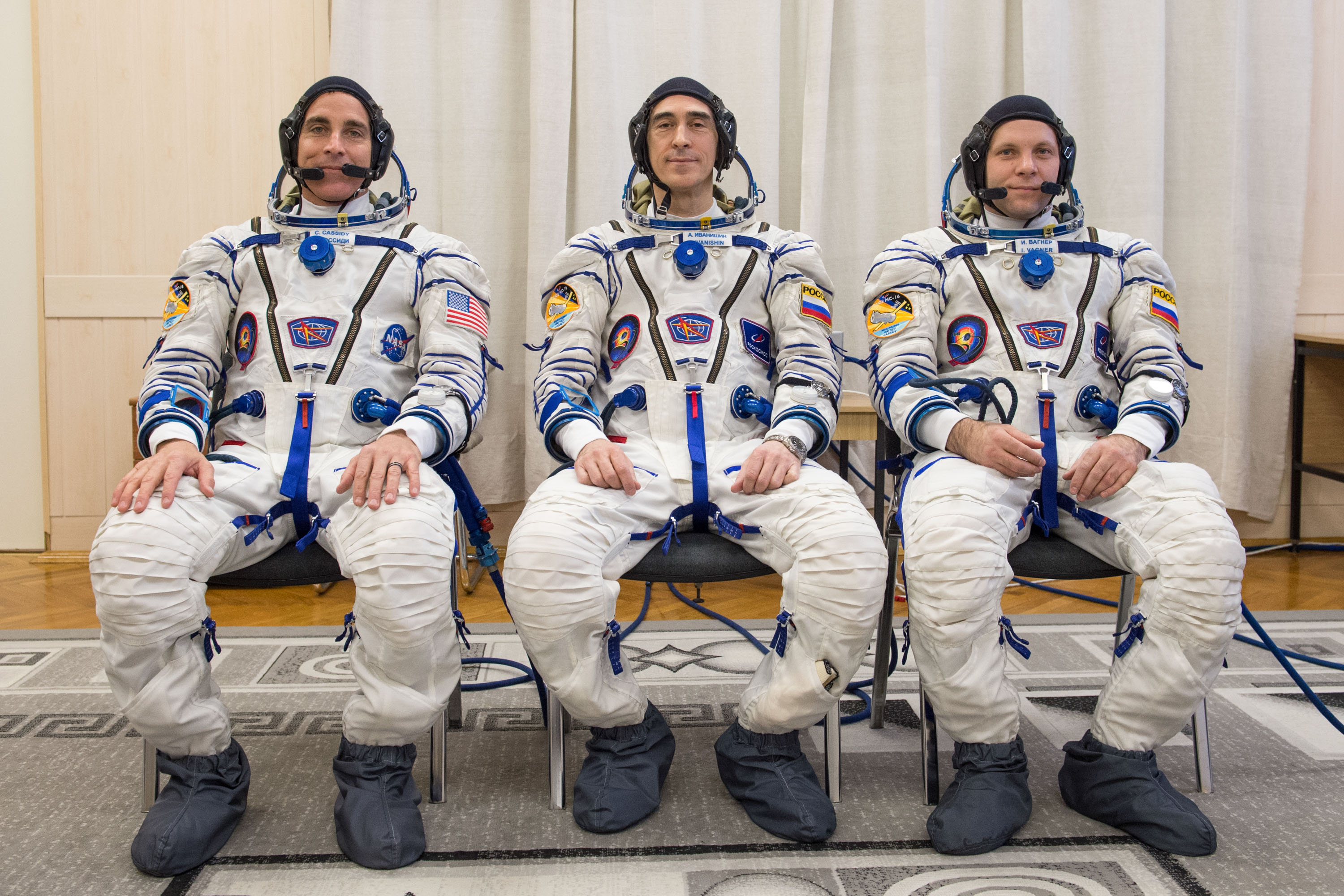
- Mission patch From left: Cassidy, Ivanishin and Vagner Soyuz programme

Soyuz MS-16 was a Soyuz spaceflight launched on 9 April 2020, which transported three members of the Expedition 62/63 crew to the International Space Station.

This flight was the first crewed launch using the Soyuz 2.1a launch vehicle, and the first crewed Russian mission not to launch from Gagarin's Start since Soyuz MS-02 in 2016.

== Crew ==
Position	Crew member
Commander	Anatoli Ivanishin, Roscosmos; Expedition 62/63; Third and last spaceflight
Flight engineer	Ivan Vagner, Roscosmos; Expedition 62/63; First spaceflight
Flight engineer	Christopher Cassidy, NASA; Expedition 62/63; Third and last spaceflight

=== Backup crew ===
Position	Crew member
Commander	Sergey Ryzhikov, Roscosmos
Flight engineer	Andrei Babkin, Roscosmos
Flight engineer	Stephen Bowen, NASA

=== Crew notes ===
This flight would have marked the first spaceflight for rookie cosmonaut Nikolai Tikhonov, who has been removed from several ISS flights due to delays to the Russian Nauka laboratory module starting with Soyuz MS-04. Tikhonov and Babkin were replaced by their backups, Ivanishin and Vagner, for medical reasons. Tikhonov, the original Soyuz commander, suffered an eye injury, and Russian officials opted to swap both Russian crew members with the back-up crew.

Tikhonov and Babkin were expected to fly on Soyuz MS-17, scheduled for October 2020 when Tikhonov's eye injury was set to have had healed, although the two were not assigned to this mission. Tikhonov has since retired from roscosmos, while Babkin remains an active cosmonaut, but he has not yet been assigned to a future spaceflight.

Due to the COVID-19 pandemic, the crew's families and media representatives could not watch the launch in Baikonur, and the usual pre-launch traditions dating back to Yuri Gagarin's flight on Vostok 1 were canceled.

== Mission ==
Soyuz MS-16 was launched on 9 April 2020 at 08:05:06 UTC. The Soyuz 2.1a booster's first and core stage engines ignited on time and lifted the rocket away from its firing stand at the Baikonur Cosmodrome, with cosmonaut Anatoli Ivanishin, joined by the rookie Ivan Vagner on the left and astronaut Chris Cassidy on the right. Like Ivanishin, Cassidy is making his third space flight. NASA administrator Jim Bridenstine tweeted congratulations: "Chris Cassidy, Anatoly Ivanishin and Ivan Vagner are safely in orbit, no virus is stronger than the human desire to explore. I'm grateful to the entire @NASA and @roscosmos teams for their dedication to making this launch a success".

The International Space Station passed directly over the launch site about three minutes before the launch and the booster climbed directly into the plane of its orbit. Six orbits after that, at 14:13:18 UTC, the Soyuz docked at the Poisk docking compartment.

== Return ==
The Soyuz capsule undocked from the International Space Station at approximately 23:32:00 UTC and landed in the steppes of Kazakhstan at 02:54:12 UTC.
