= Expedition 62 =

62nd long duration mission to the ISS

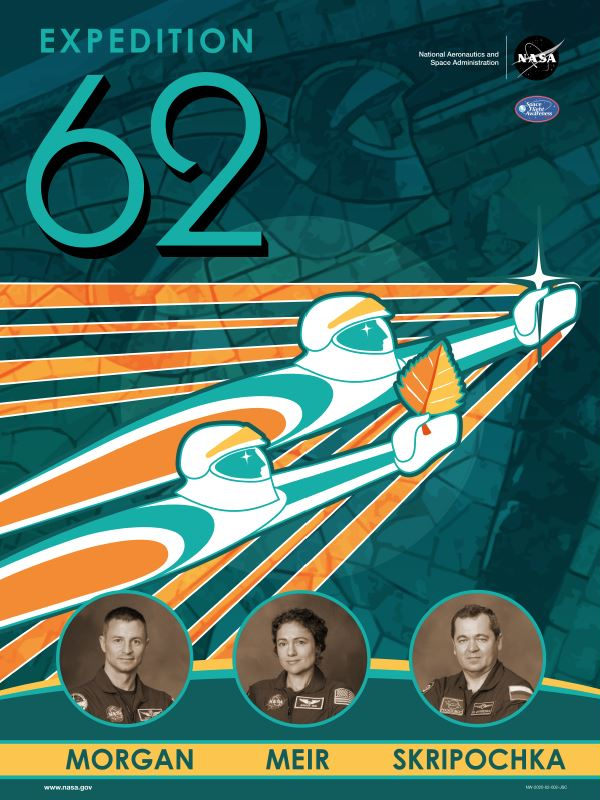
- Promotional Poster
- Mission type: Long-duration expedition
- Mission duration: 70d 20h 3m

Expedition
- Space station: International Space Station
- Began: 6 February 2020, 05:50:28 UTC
- Ended: 17 April 2020, 01:53:30 UTC
- Arrived aboard: Soyuz MS-13; Soyuz MS-15; Soyuz MS-16
- Departed aboard: Soyuz MS-15

Crew
- Crew size: 6
- Members: Expedition 61/62: Oleg Skripochka; Jessica Meir; Expedition 60/61/62: Andrew Morgan; Expedition 62/63: Anatoli Ivanishin; Ivan Vagner; Christopher Cassidy
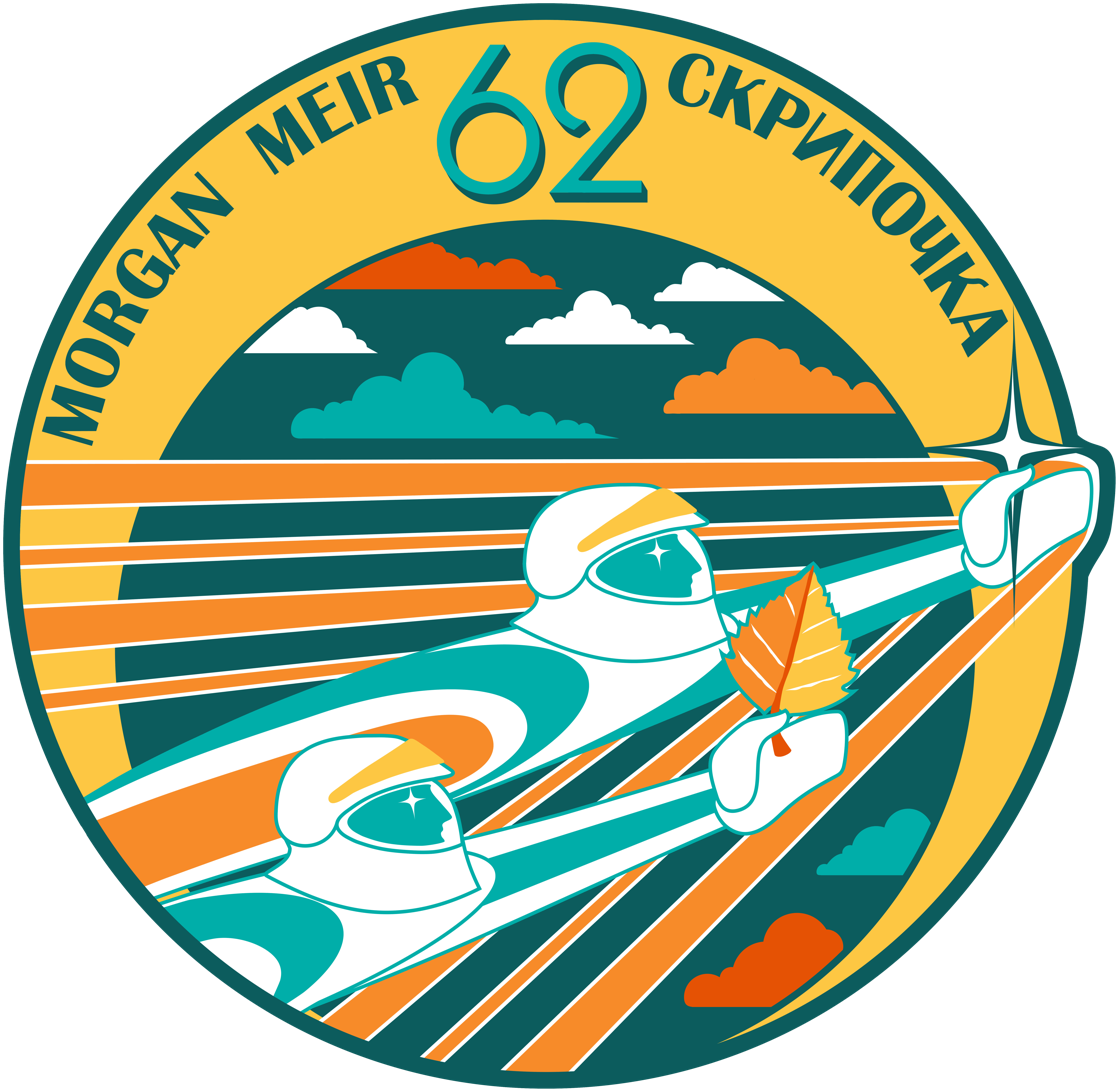
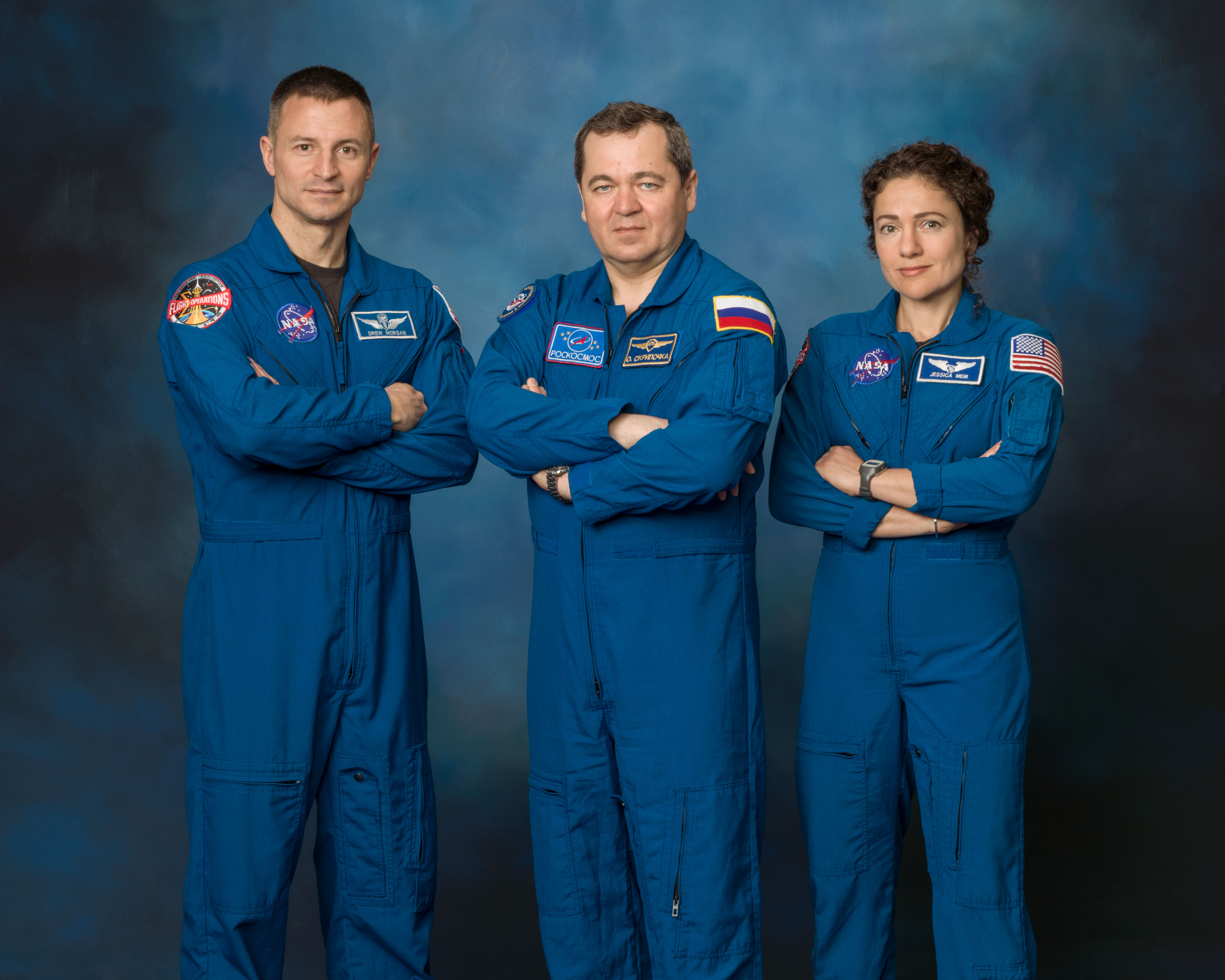
- Expedition 62 mission patch From left: NASA astronaut Andrew Morgan, Roscosmos cosmonaut Oleg Skripochka, and NASA astronaut Jessica Meir. ISS expeditions

Expedition 62 was the 62nd long duration mission to the International Space Station, which began 5:50 UTC on 6 February 2020 with the undocking of the Soyuz MS-13 spacecraft. The expedition consisted of Russian commander Oleg Skripochka, as well as American flight engineers Jessica Meir and Andrew Morgan.

== Crew ==
Position	First part (6 February – 9 April 2020)	Second part (9–17 April 2020)
Commander	Oleg Skripochka, RSA; Third and last spaceflight	
Flight engineer	Jessica Meir, NASA; First spaceflight	
Flight engineer	Andrew Morgan, NASA; Only spaceflight	
Flight engineer	Off station	Anatoli Ivanishin, RSA; Third and last spaceflight
Flight engineer	Off station	Ivan Vagner, RSA; First spaceflight
Flight engineer	Off station	Christopher Cassidy, NASA; Third and last spaceflight

== Crew notes ==
Soyuz MS-16 was originally meant to transport the Expedition 63/64 crew to the ISS, carrying Tikhonov, Babkin and Japanese astronaut Akihiko Hoshide to the ISS. On 31 October 2019 it was announced that NASA astronaut Chris Cassidy would fly the mission instead of Hoshide, in order to make sure an American astronaut was on board the station at all times, in the face of delays with the Commercial Crew Program. These changes also meant that Soyuz MS-16's crew would make up part of Expedition 62. The expedition also marked the first time the Russian segment of the ISS has had three crew members since Expedition 50 and was one of the shortest expeditions in the program at just over two months long.

== Patch design notes ==
In February 2019, graphic designer and art director Jessie Bowers (Cypha) designed the Expedition 62 patch. This mission patch is the final ISS expedition insignia that bears the crew's surnames. All succeeding patches have no names in their graphics since the expedition member sizes has expanded to eleven individuals.
