= Anatoly Ivanishin =

Russian cosmonaut (born 1969)

- Анатолий Иванишин
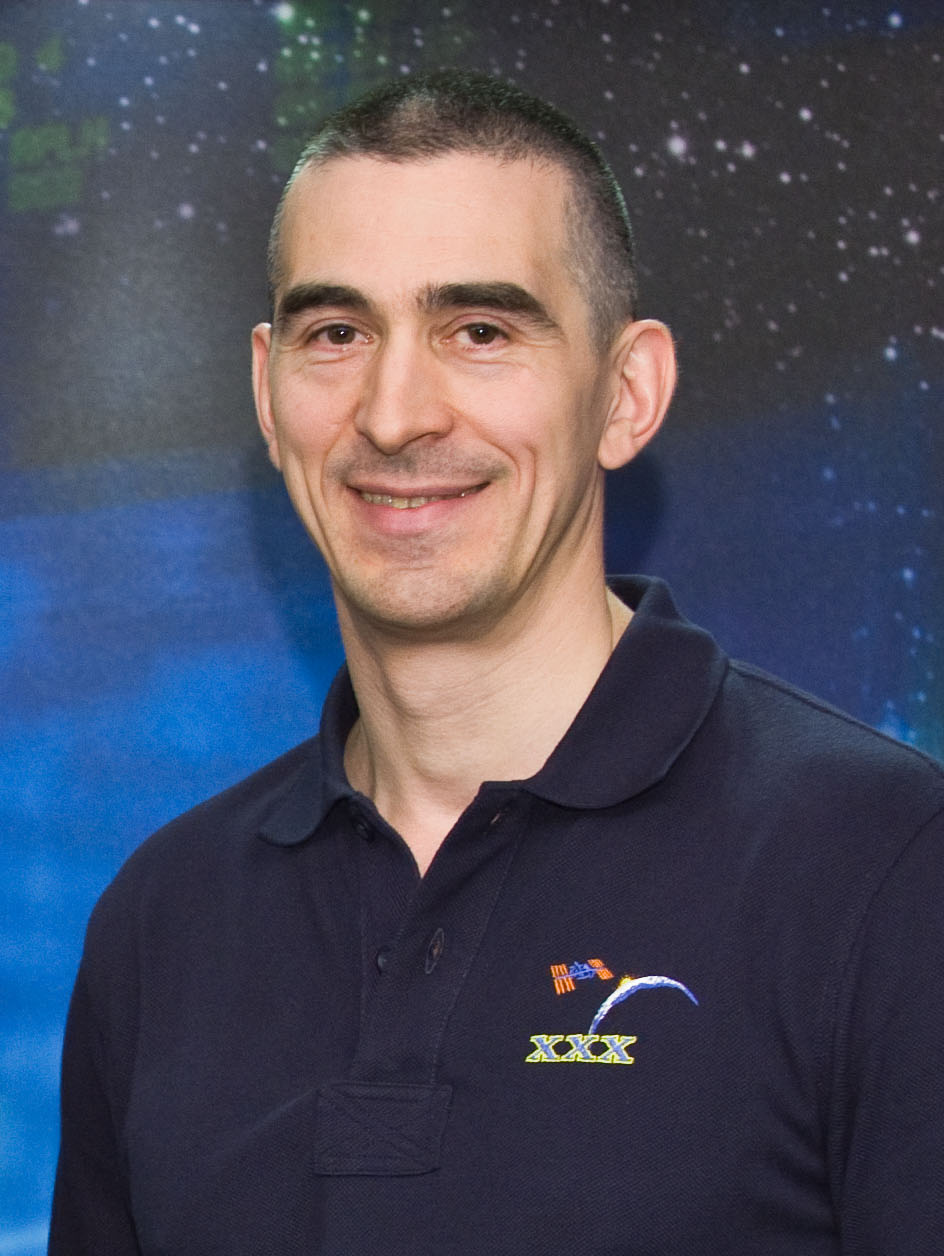
- Ivanishin in 2011
- Born: Anatoli Alekseyevich Ivanishin; 15 January 1969 (age 57); Irkutsk, Russian SFSR, Soviet Union
- Education: Chernihiv Higher Military Aviation School of Pilots; Moscow State University
- Occupation: Pilot
- Awards: Hero of the Russian Federation; Order of Merit for the Fatherland (IV); Pilot-Cosmonaut of the Russian Federation; NASA Distinguished Public Service Medal; NASA Space Flight Medal
- Space career

Roscosmos cosmonaut
- Status: Retired
- Rank: Colonel, Russian Air Force (reserve)
- Time in space: 476 days, 4 hours, 41 minutes
- Selection: TsPK-13 Cosmonaut Group (2003)
- Missions: Soyuz TMA-22 (Expedition 29/30); Soyuz MS-01 (Expedition 48/49); Soyuz MS-16 (Expedition 62/63)
- Retired: 15 October 2021

Anatoli Alekseyevich Ivanishin (Russian: Анатолий Алексеевич Иванишин; born 15 January 1969) is a former Russian cosmonaut. His first visit to space was to the International Space Station on board the Soyuz TMA-22 spacecraft as an Expedition 29/Expedition 30 crew member, launching in November 2011 and returning in April 2012. Ivanishin was the commander of the International Space Station for Expedition 49.

== Personal life ==
He was born in Irkutsk in Siberia. Ivanishin is married to Svetlana Ivanishina. They have one son, Vladislav Ivanishin, born in 1993. His father is Alexey Ivanishin and his mother is Nina Ivanishina.

== Early life and education ==
In 1986 Ivanishin finished secondary school education from Irkutsk. In 1986 he unsuccessfully attempted to enter the Chernigov Higher Military Aviation School for Pilots. He entered the Irkutsk Polytechnic Institute, and in 1987 completed his first year. In his second attempt Ivanishin entered the Chernigov Higher Military Aviation School in 1987, and in 1991 graduated with a gold medal. In 2003 Ivanishin graduated from the Moscow State University in Economics, Statistics and Information Theory.

== Military career ==
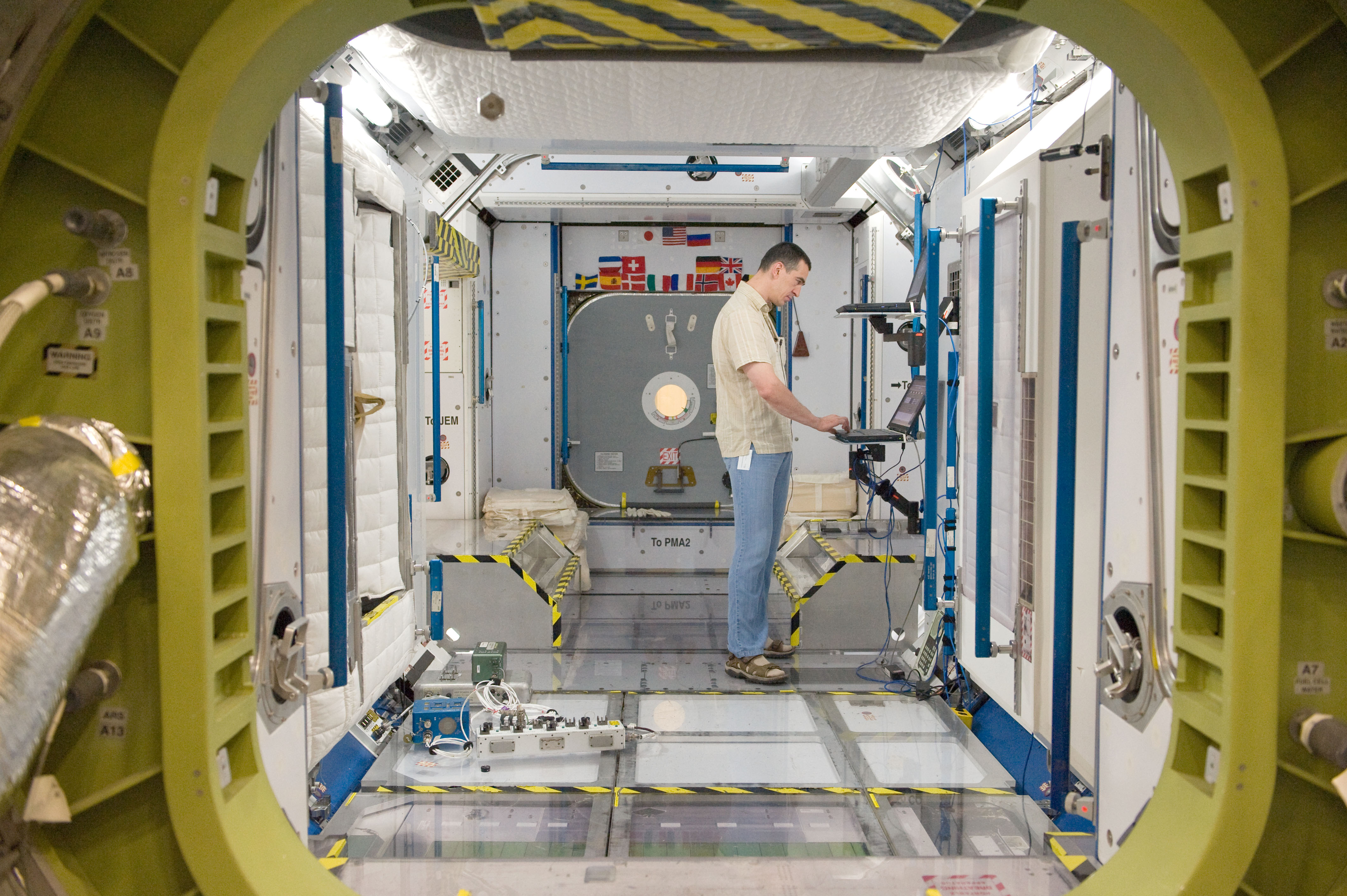
Anatoly Ivanishin participates in a training session at NASA's Johnson Space Center.

Since 1991, Ivanishin has served in combatant units of the Russian Air Force. After graduating from the Chernigov Higher Military Aviation School, he served in the Borisoglebsk military unit, Voronezh region, where Ivanishin flew MiG-29 jet fighter planes. Since 1992, he served as a senior fighter pilot in the 159th Fighter Aviation Regiment based in Petrozavodsk, Karelia, part of the 6th Air Army. During the service he flew Su-27 jet fighter aircraft. He has logged 507 hours of flying time and has successfully made 180 parachute jumps.

== Cosmonaut career ==
On 29 May 2003, Ivanishin was enlisted as a cosmonaut candidate to go through space training. On 16 June 2003, he began training and passed the state examinations with a rating of "excellent" on 28 June 2005. On 5 July 2005, Ivanishin was awarded the test cosmonaut qualification.

On October 15, 2021, Roscosmos announced that Ivanishin was retiring from the Cosmonaut training centre to devote most of his time to "scientific activities"

=== Expedition 29/30 ===
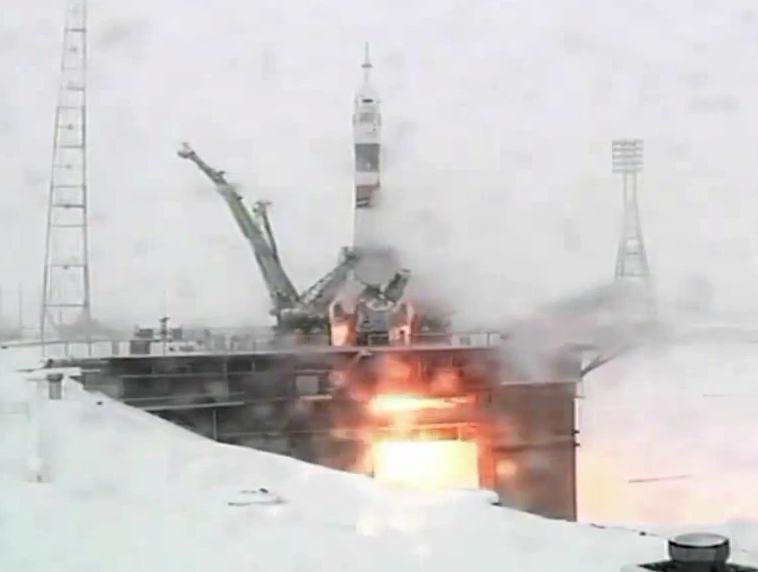
The launch of Soyuz TMA-22 in blizzard conditions

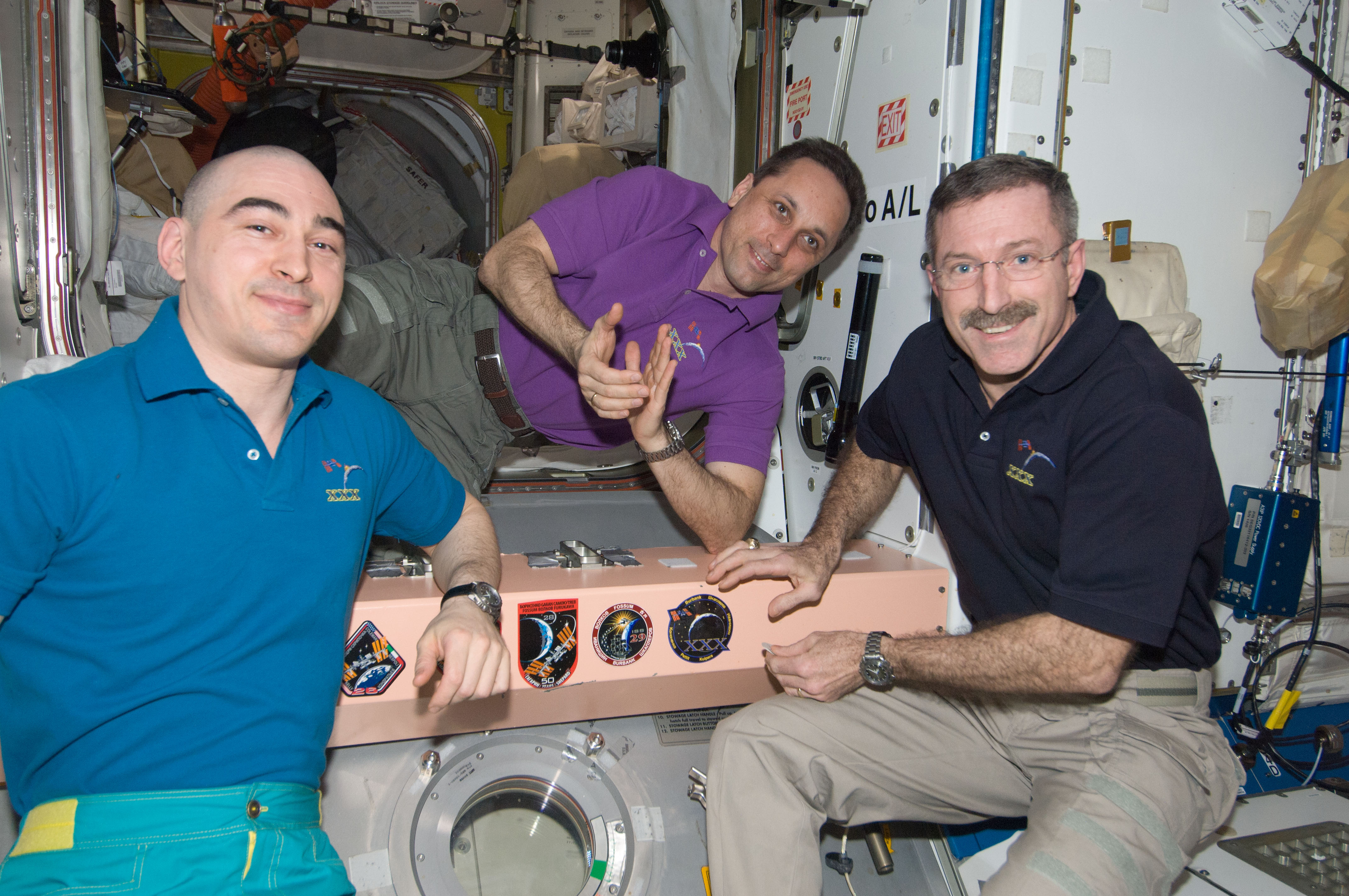
Ivanishin (left) pictured with his fellow Soyuz crew members during Expedition 30

Ivanishin served as the Soyuz TMA-20 backup commander, backing up Russian cosmonaut Dimitri Kondratyev for ISS Expedition 26/27, directly holding the position of Expedition 27 backup Commander. TMA-20 launched on 15 December 2010, following which Ivanishin was assigned as Flight Engineer for ISS Expedition 29/30.

On 14 November 2011, Ivanishin launched on his first flight into space as flight engineer on board Soyuz TMA-22 alongside Roscosmos cosmonaut Anton Shkaplerov and NASA astronaut Daniel Burbank, the three successfully arrived at the space station on 16 November following a two-day free flight to the ISS. They officially joined Roscosmos cosmonaut Sergey Volkov, JAXA astronaut Satoshi Furukawa and NASA astronaut Mike Fossum as members of the Expedition 29 crew. The Expedition ended only days later with the departure of Soyuz TMA-02M on 21 November 2011, carrying Volkov, Furukawa and Fossum back to Earth, following which Burbank took command of the station for Expedition 30.

The three were soon joined by Roscosmos cosmonaut Oleg Kononenko, Dutch ESA astronaut André Kuipers and NASA astronaut Donald Pettit, who launched aboard Soyuz TMA-03M on 21 December 2011. On 16 February 2012, Ivanishin supported a spacewalk by his fellow cosmonauts, Shkaplerov and Kononenko, who performed a six-hour, 15-minute EVA from the Pirs airlock module on the Russian segment of the ISS. The two set up several experiments on the outside of the station and moved a Strela crane from Pirs to the Poisk module while Burbank and Ivanishin remained inside Soyuz TMA-22 in case of an emergency.

Due to a delay with the launch of the Expedition 31/32 crew on board Soyuz TMA-04M, the landing of Soyuz TMA-22 was delayed from March to late April 2012. Ivanishin, along with Shkaplerov and Burbank, landed safely in Kazakhstan on 27 April, wrapping up his first spaceflight after 165 days in orbit.

=== Expedition 48/49 ===
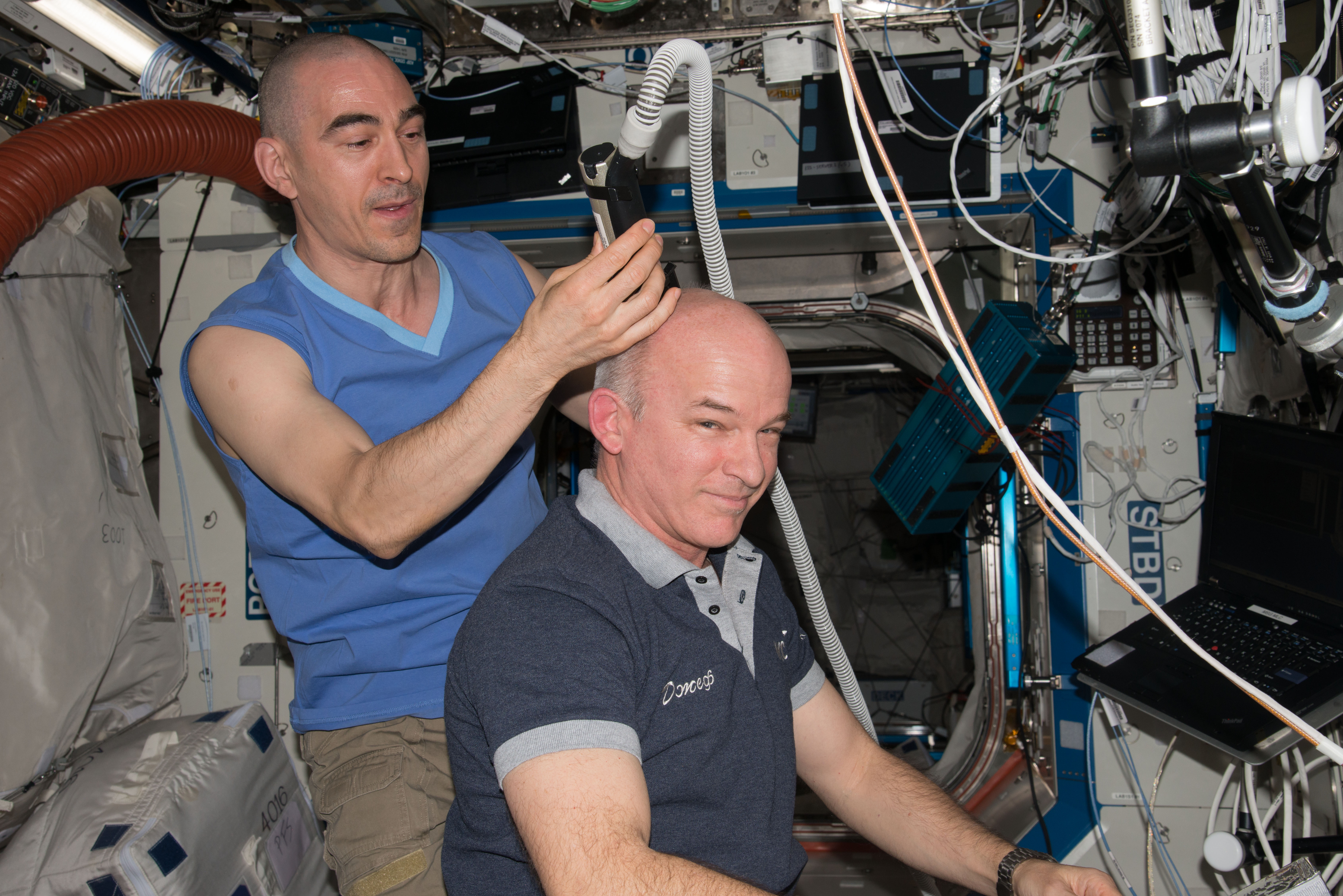
Ivanishin (left) pictured giving Expedition 48 Commander Jeff Williams a haircut

For his second flight, Ivanishin was assigned to the crew of ISS Expedition 48/49, serving as a flight engineer on Expedition 48 and Commander on Expedition 49. Originally this flight was to have launched on Soyuz TMA-20M, the final flight of the Soyuz TMA-M series of spacecraft, although delays with the launch of the first Soyuz MS series spacecraft, originally scheduled to launch the Expedition 47/48 crew, was pushed back to Expedition 48/49, so Ivanishin's crew instead were assigned to launch aboard Soyuz MS-01.

Ivanishin, alongside JAXA astronaut Takuya Onishi and NASA astronaut Kathleen Rubins launched into space on board Soyuz MS-01 on 7 July 2016, following a delay from 24 June due to issues with the spacecraft software. The trio spent two days in orbit testing various new systems on the Soyuz MS spacecraft, before rendezvous and docking with the ISS on 9 July, officially becoming members of the Expedition 48 crew alongside NASA astronaut Jeff Williams and Russian cosmonauts Aleksey Ovchinin and Oleg Skripochka.

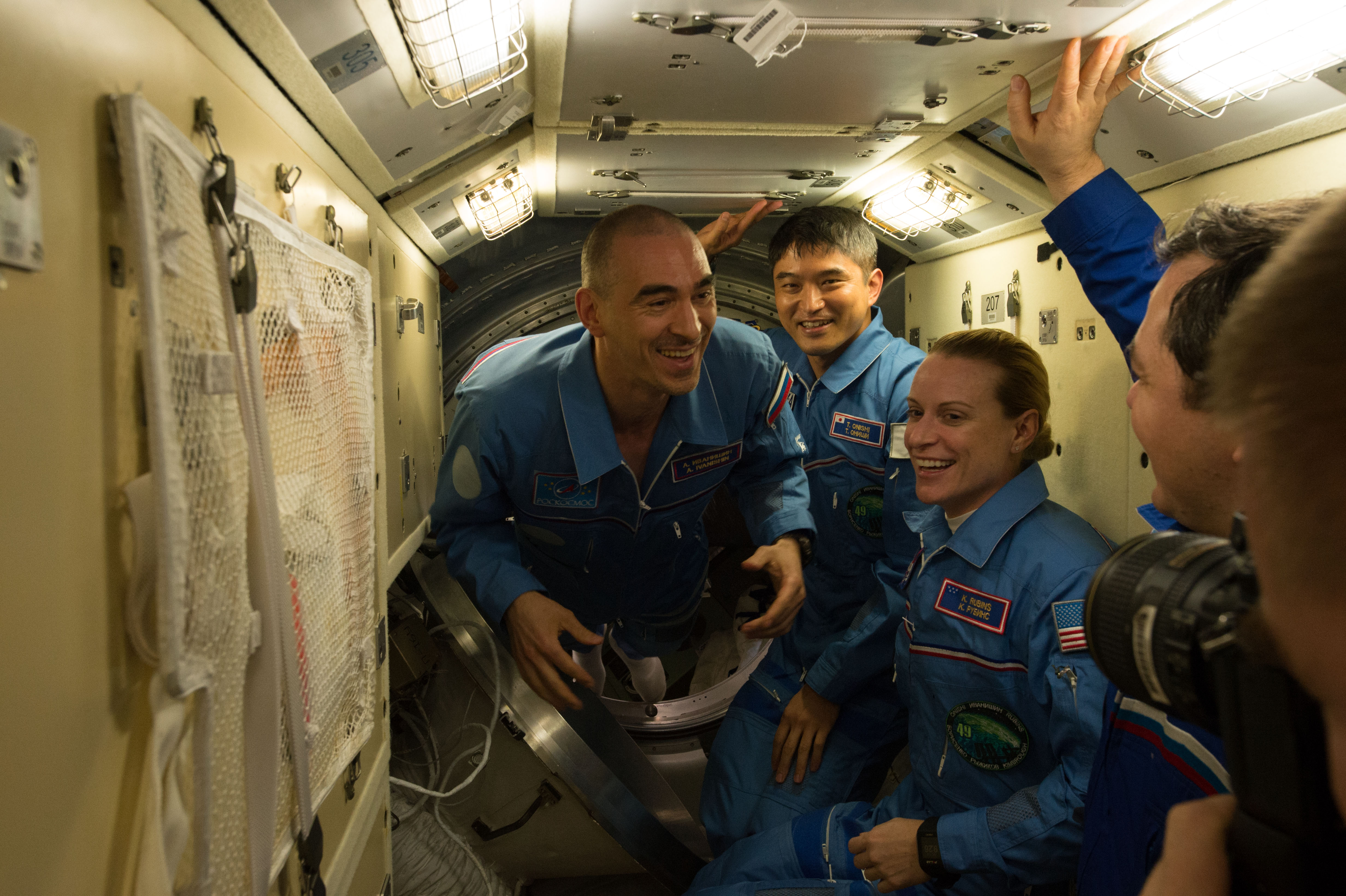
Ivanishin (left) alongside fellow Soyuz crew members shortly after docking to the ISS

Expedition 48 officially ended on 6 September 2016 with the departure of Soyuz TMA-20M, following which Ivanishin took Command of the station for Expedition 49. They were supposed to be joined by the three crew members on Soyuz MS-02 on 25 September, although continuing issues with the introduction of the Soyuz MS spacecraft forced the launch of MS-02 to be delayed due to technical reasons. Soyuz MS-02 was successfully launched on 19 October 2016, carrying Roscosmos cosmonauts Sergey Ryzhikov and Andrei Borisenko as well as NASA astronaut Shane Kimbrough to the station. They arrived on 21 October and joined Ivanishin and his crew.

Following a very short period of six crew operations with the crew of Soyuz MS-02, Ivanishin handed over command of the station to Kimbrough, following which he returned to Earth with his two crewmates on 29 October 2016 following 115 days in space, bringing up Ivanishin's total time in orbit to 280 days.

=== Expedition 62/63 ===
Ivanishin was assigned to back up Russian Soyuz Commander Nikolai Tikhonov for the mission of Soyuz MS-16, scheduled for launch in April 2020. However, in February 2020 Tikhonov and Russian Flight Engineer Andrei Babkin were removed from the flight due to a temporary health condition with Tikhonov. Subsequently, Ivanishin and Ivan Vagner (Babkin's backup) were moved forward onto the prime crew.

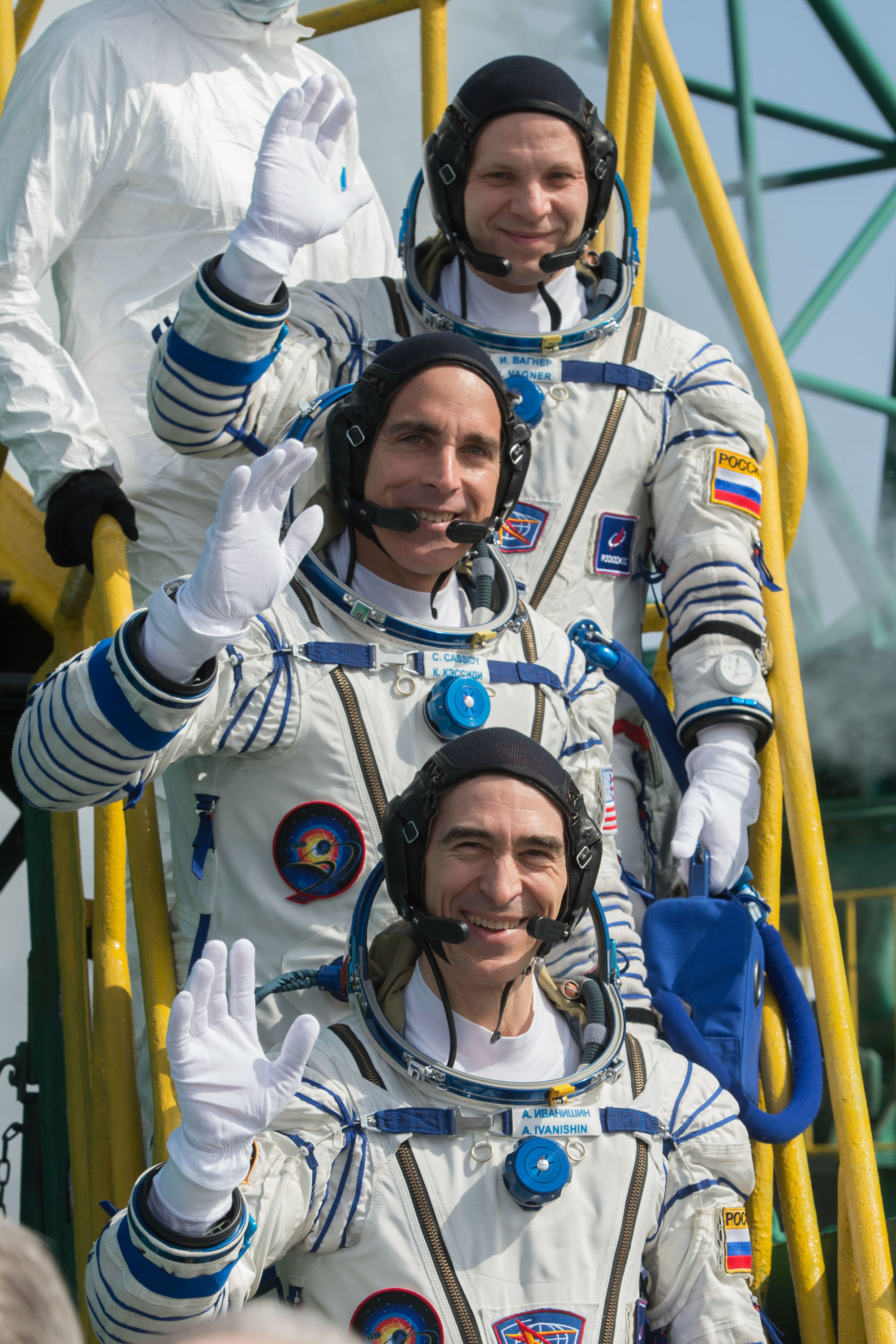
Ivanishin, Cassidy and Vagner prior to launch.

Ivanishin launched aboard Soyuz MS-16, along with Vagner and NASA astronaut Christopher Cassidy, on 9 April 2020. The trio successfully arrived in orbit and docked with the ISS six hours later, officially joining the Expedition 62 crew alongside Roscosmos cosmonaut Oleg Skripochka and NASA astronauts Jessica Meir and Andrew R. Morgan. Following just eight days of six-person operations, Morgan, Meir and Skripochka departed the space station aboard Soyuz MS-15, following which Ivanishin and his two crewmates transferred over to Expedition 63, with Cassidy taking command of the station.

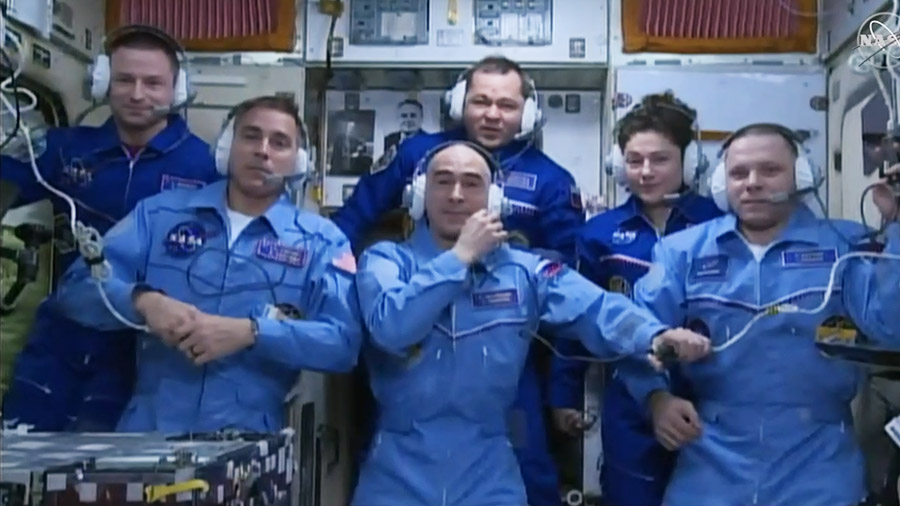
Expedition 62 following the arrival of Soyuz MS-16.

The Expedition 63 crew welcomed the Crew Dragon Demo-2 mission for a stay on board the station on 31 May 2020. This flight marked the first crewed test flight of the SpaceX Crew Dragon spacecraft and the first crewed orbital spacecraft to launch from US soil since STS-135, the final flight of the Space Shuttle program, in 2011. The mission was crewed by NASA astronauts Doug Hurley and Robert Behnken, who stayed on board the ISS for two months.

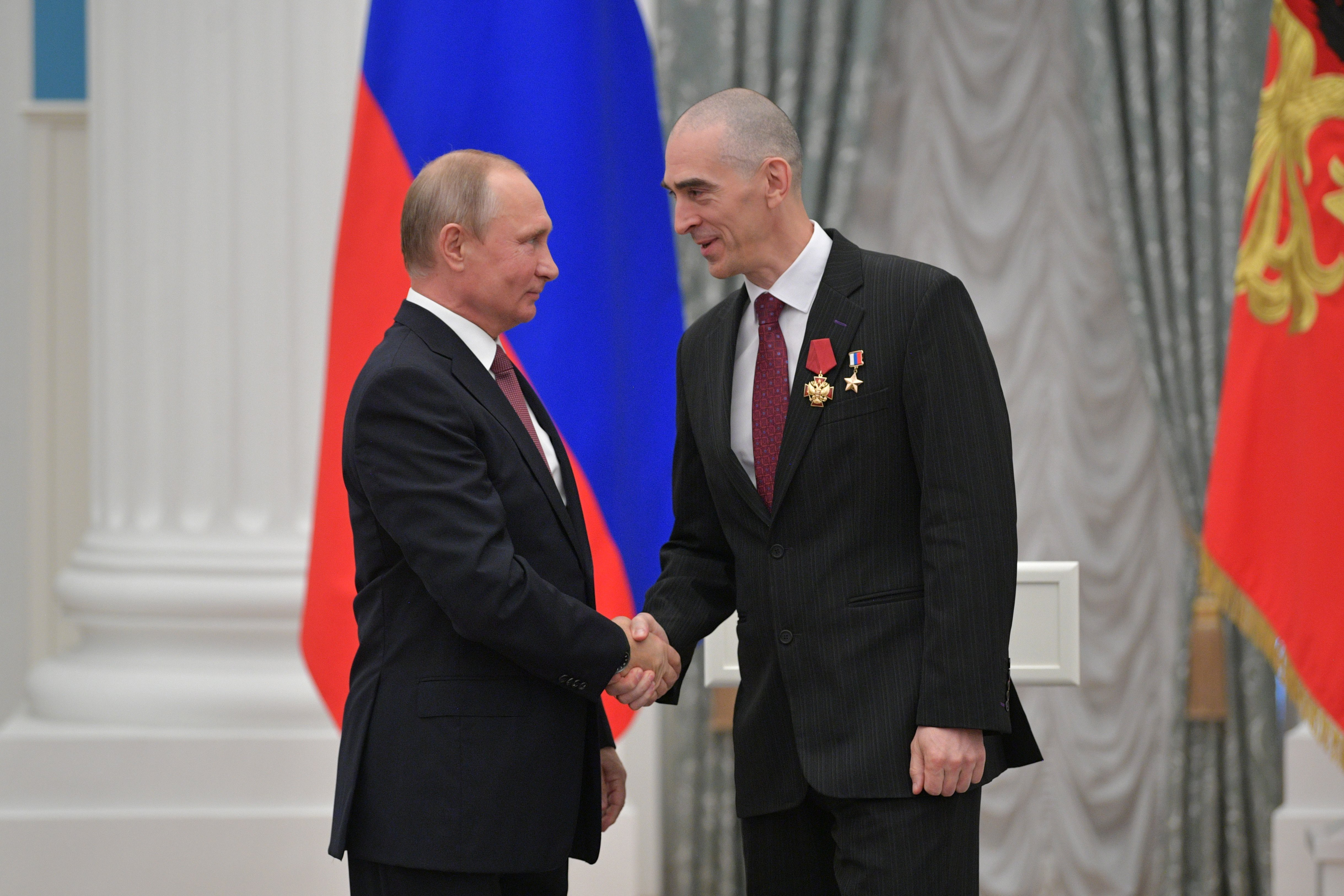
Presentation of the Order "For Merit to the Fatherland", 4th class (June 27, 2018)

== See also ==
- List of Heroes of the Russian Federation
- 2015 in spaceflight

| Preceded by Jeffrey Williams | ISS Commander (Expedition 49); 6 September to 30 October 2016 | Succeeded by Robert S. Kimbrough |
