= Andrey Borisenko =

Russian cosmonaut (born 1964)

- Андрей Борисенко
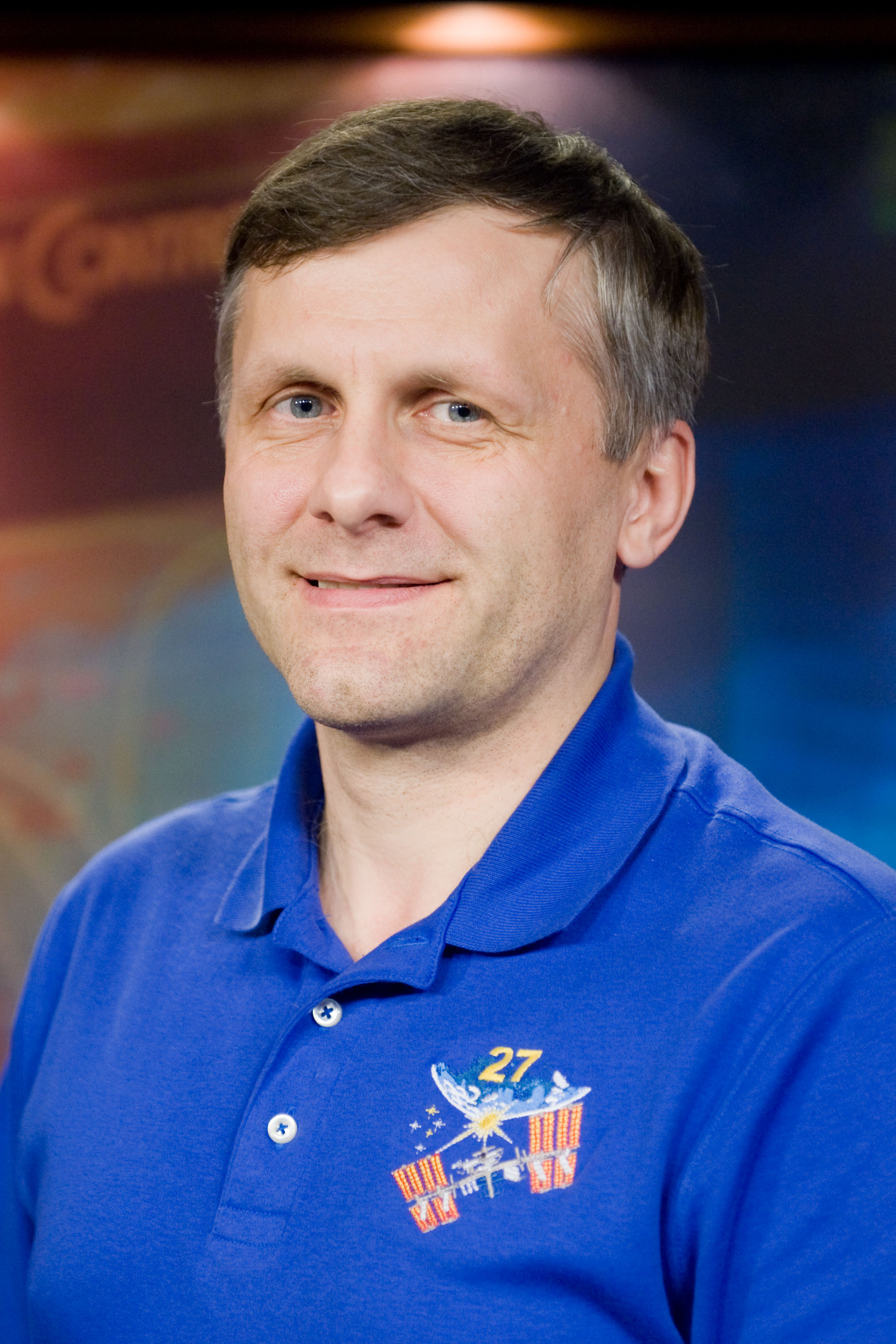
- Born: 17 April 1964 (age 62); Leningrad, Russian SFSR, Soviet Union
- Space career

Roscosmos cosmonaut
- Status: Retired
- Time in space: 337 days 8 hours 57 minutes
- Selection: 2003 RKKE Group
- Missions: Soyuz TMA-21 (Expedition 27/28), Soyuz MS-02 (Expedition 49/50)
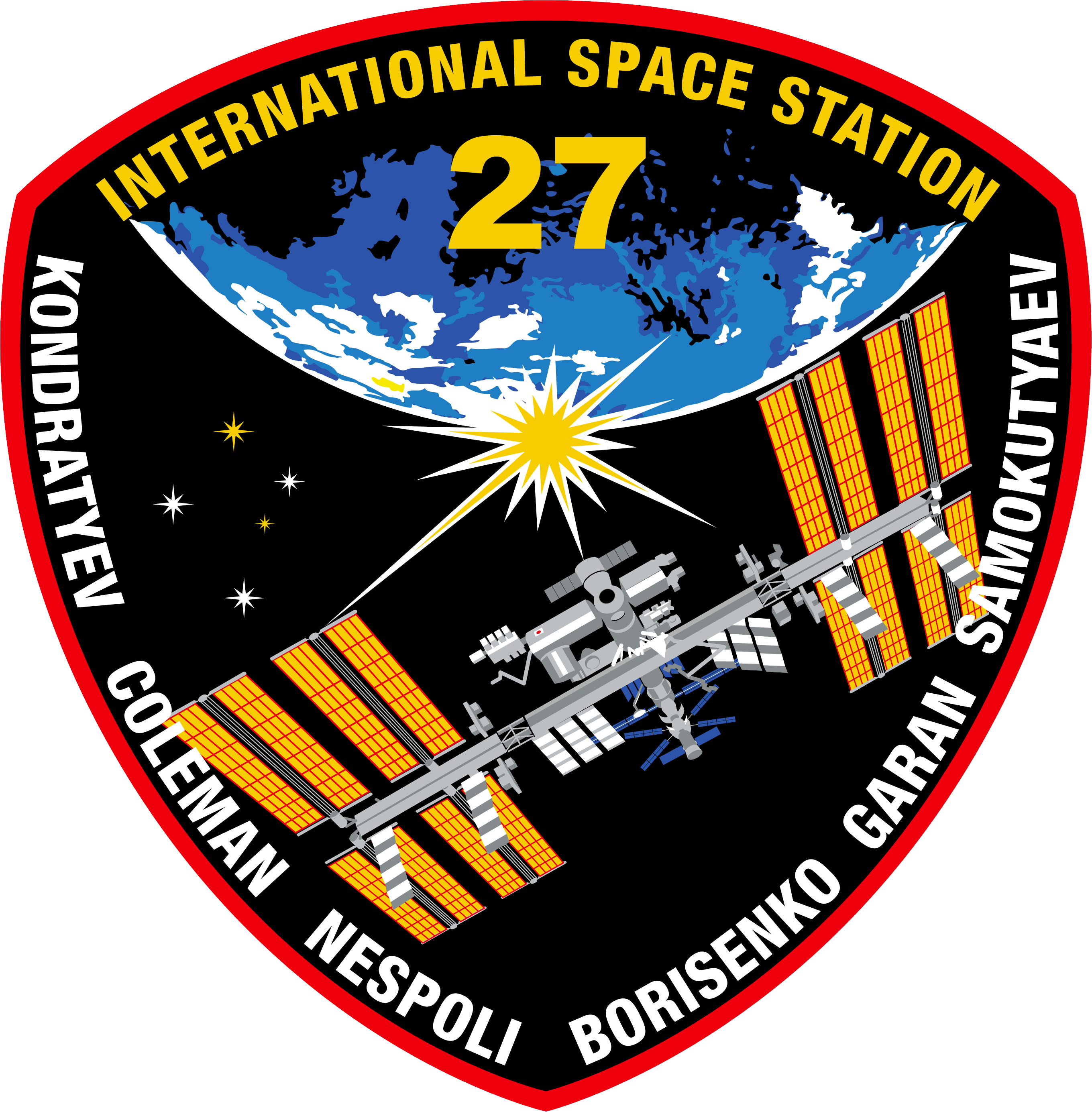
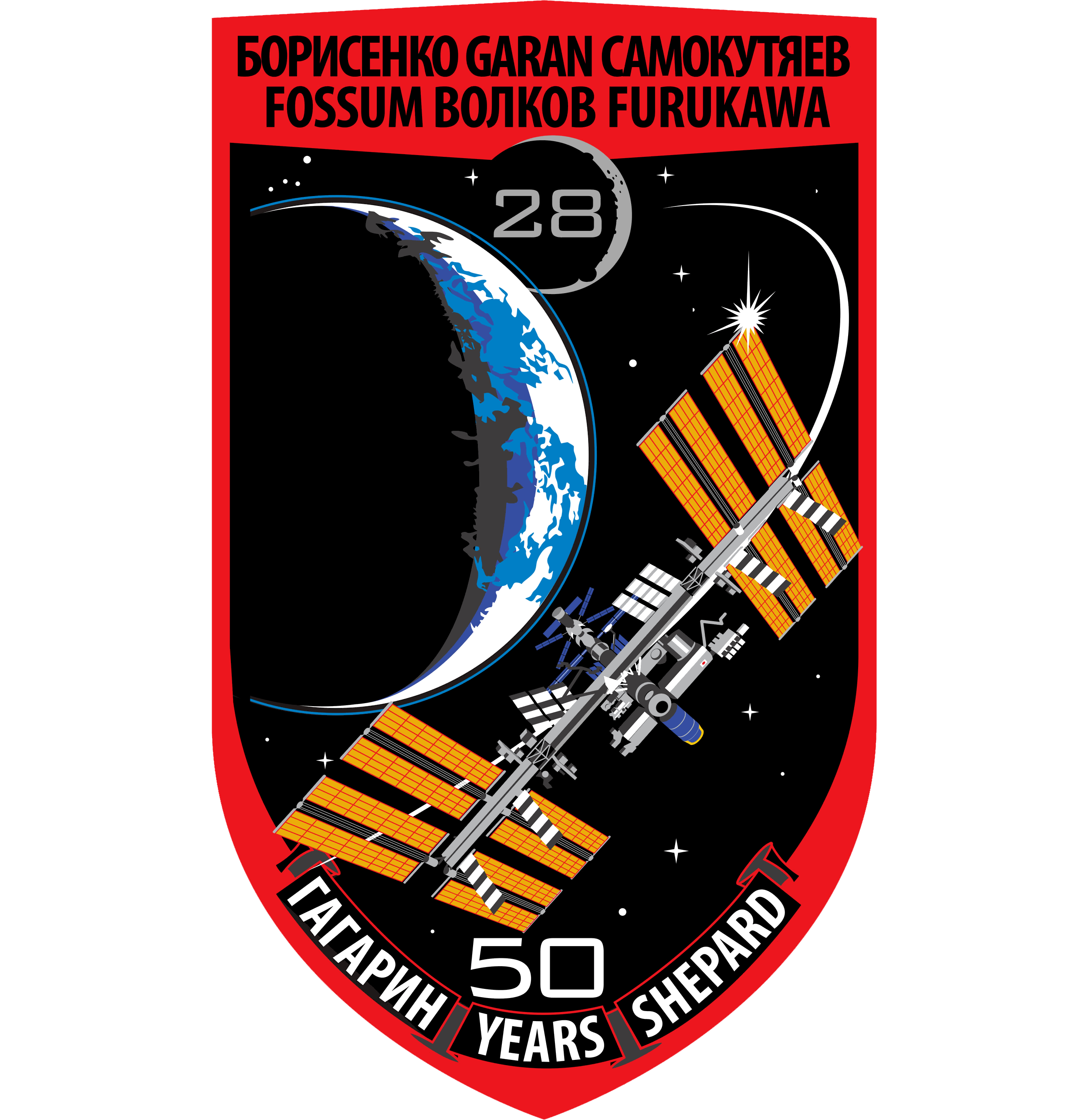
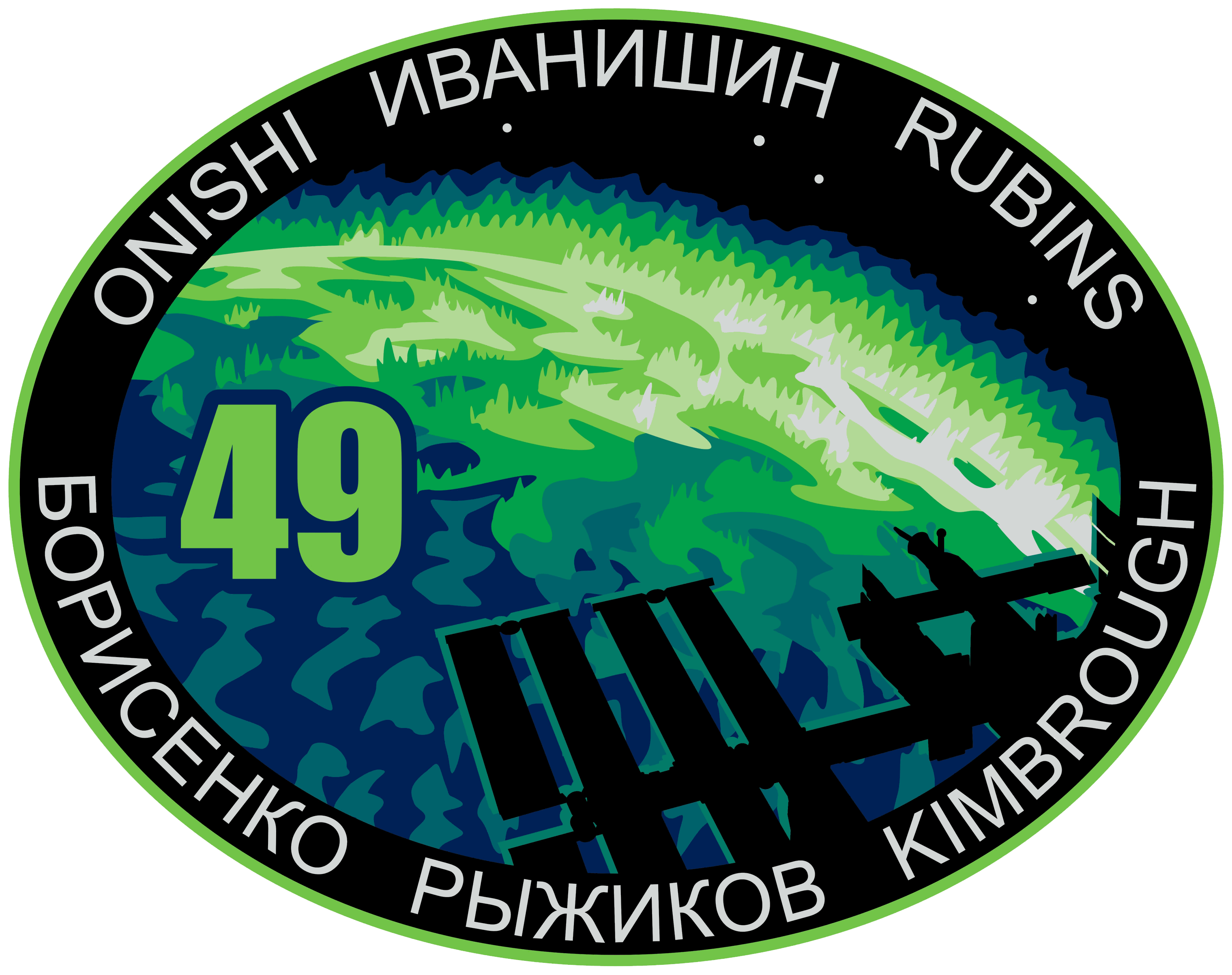
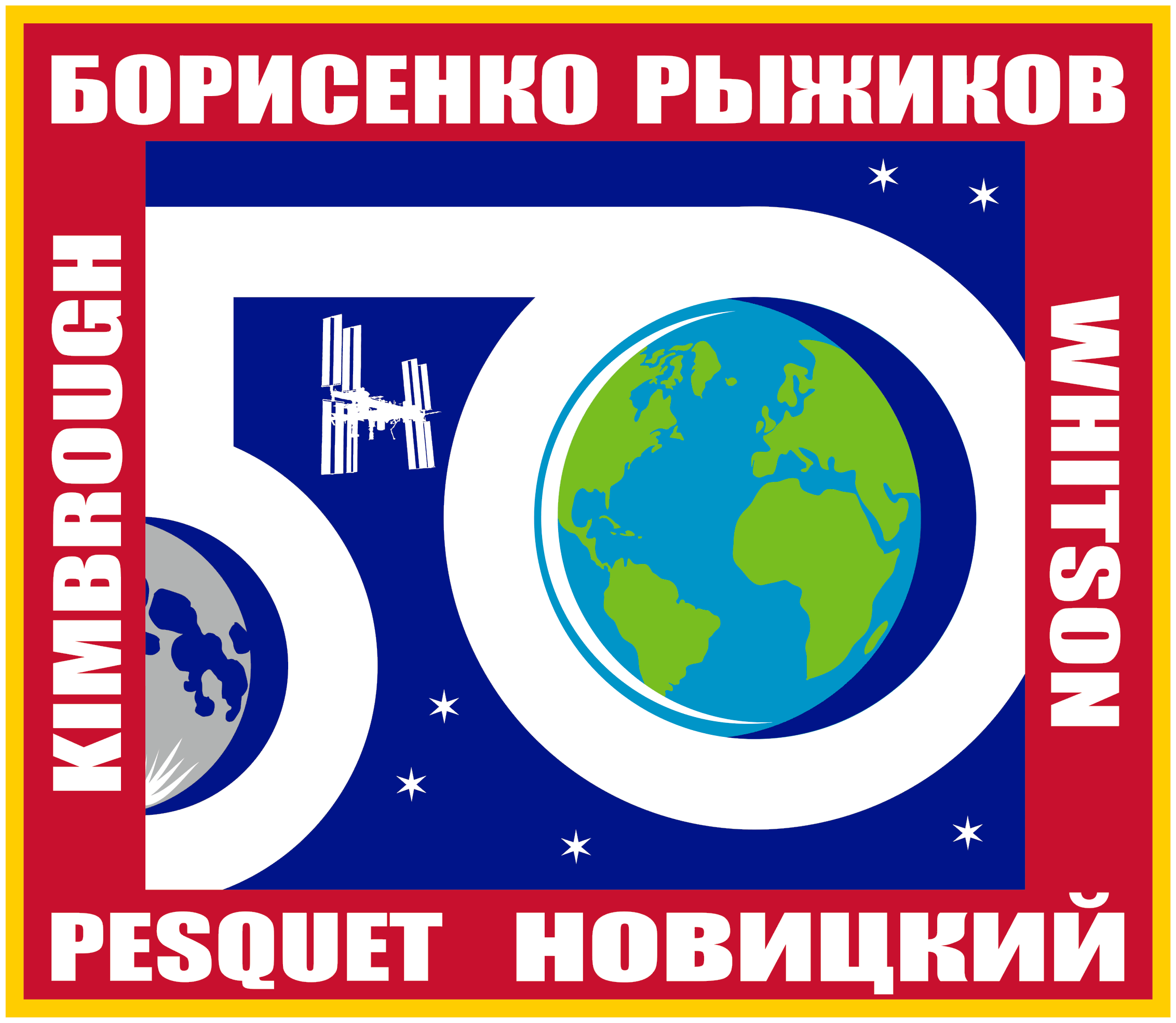
- Mission insignia
- Retired: February 26, 2021

Andrey Ivanovich Borisenko (Russian: Андрей Иванович Борисенко; born 17 April 1964) is a former Russian cosmonaut. He was selected as a cosmonaut in May 2003 and is a veteran of two long duration missions to the International Space Station.

Borisenko served as a flight engineer on board Soyuz TMA-21 for Expedition 27, the 27th long-duration mission to the International Space Station (ISS). He also served as the commander of the International Space Station for Expedition 28. He launched for the second time in October 2016 onboard Soyuz MS-02 as a flight engineer of Expedition 49 and Expedition 50. He returned to Earth in April 2017.

== Personal life ==
Borisenko is married to Natalya Aleksandrovna Borisenko. They have two children. His parents, Ivan Andreevich and Natalya Mikhailovna Borisenko, live in St Petersburg.

In 2018, in an exhibition on space at the Lycée International de Saint-Germain-en-Laye organised by the Russian Section, he lent his suit for display.

== Education ==
Borisenko graduated from the Leningrad Physics and Mathematics School #30 in 1981. He then entered the Leningrad Military Mechanical Institute and graduated in 1987 with the qualification "Flight and Control Dynamics".

== Experience ==
Following graduation from the institute Borisenko worked for a military unit from 1987–1989. In 1989, he started working at RSC Energia where he was responsible for the Mir motion control system and took part in the Mission Control Center - Moscow (MCC-M) on board systems operation analysis board. In 1999, Borisenko was a shift flight director at the MCC-M, first for the Mir space station and then for the International Space Station (ISS).

== Cosmonaut career ==
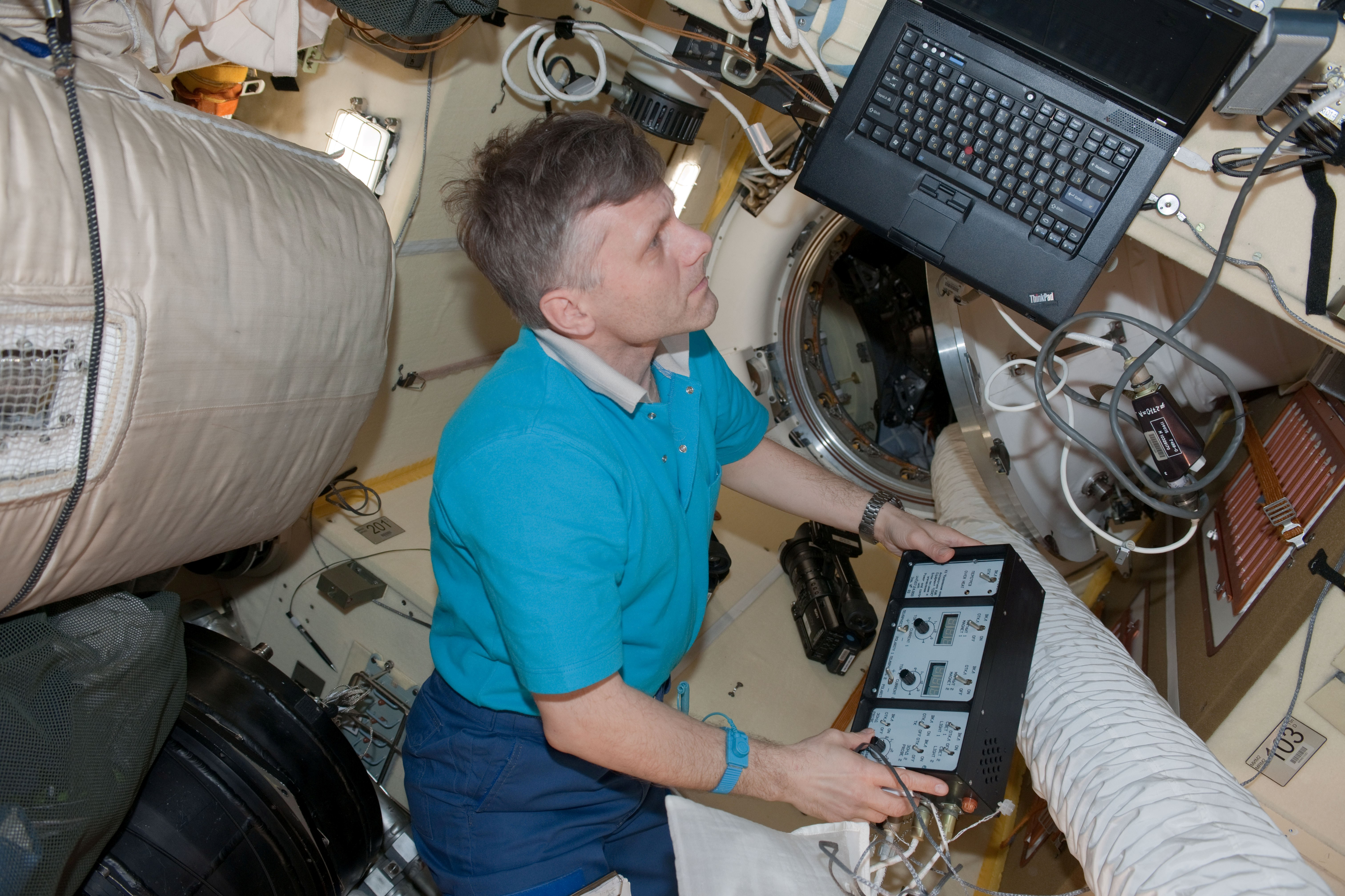
Inside the space station, Borisenko conducts the Russian experiment KPT-10 "Kulonovskiy Kristall".

Borisenko was selected as a cosmonaut candidate from RSC Energia on 29 May 2003. He started basic spaceflight training in June 2003 and completed it in June 2005 by passing the state exams with excellent grades. He received qualification of test-cosmonaut on 5 July 2005 from the Interdepartmental Qualification Commission. From July 2005 to August 2008 he participated in advanced space flight training.

For his first assignment he was assigned as backup ISS flight engineer and Soyuz commander for Expedition 24/25, although due to crew rearrangements he was moved forward to the backup crew for ISS Expedition 23/24, training as backup ISS flight engineer and Commander and Soyuz flight engineer.

=== Expedition 27/28 ===
Following the launch of ISS Expedition 23/24 on Soyuz TMA-18 in April 2010, Borisenko was released from his duties on the flight's backup crew and assigned to the prime crew of Expedition 27/28, as flight engineer on Expedition 27 and commander on Expedition 28. He and his two crewmates, Soyuz commander Aleksandr Samokutyayev of Roscosmos and NASA astronaut Ronald Garan, launched aboard Soyuz TMA-21 from the Baikonur Cosmodrome's Gagarin's Start launch pad, at 23:18:20 UTC on 4 April 2011. The launch of Soyuz TMA-21 was dedicated to the 50th anniversary of the first crewed space flight by Yuri Gagarin performed in 1961. After 2 days of autonomous flight, the Soyuz TMA-21 spacecraft docked with the International Space Station (ISS) on April 6 at 23:09 UTC, with the crew officially joining the crew of Expedition 27, alongside Russian commander Dmitri Kondratyev, NASA astronaut Catherine Coleman and Italian astronaut Paolo Nespoli.

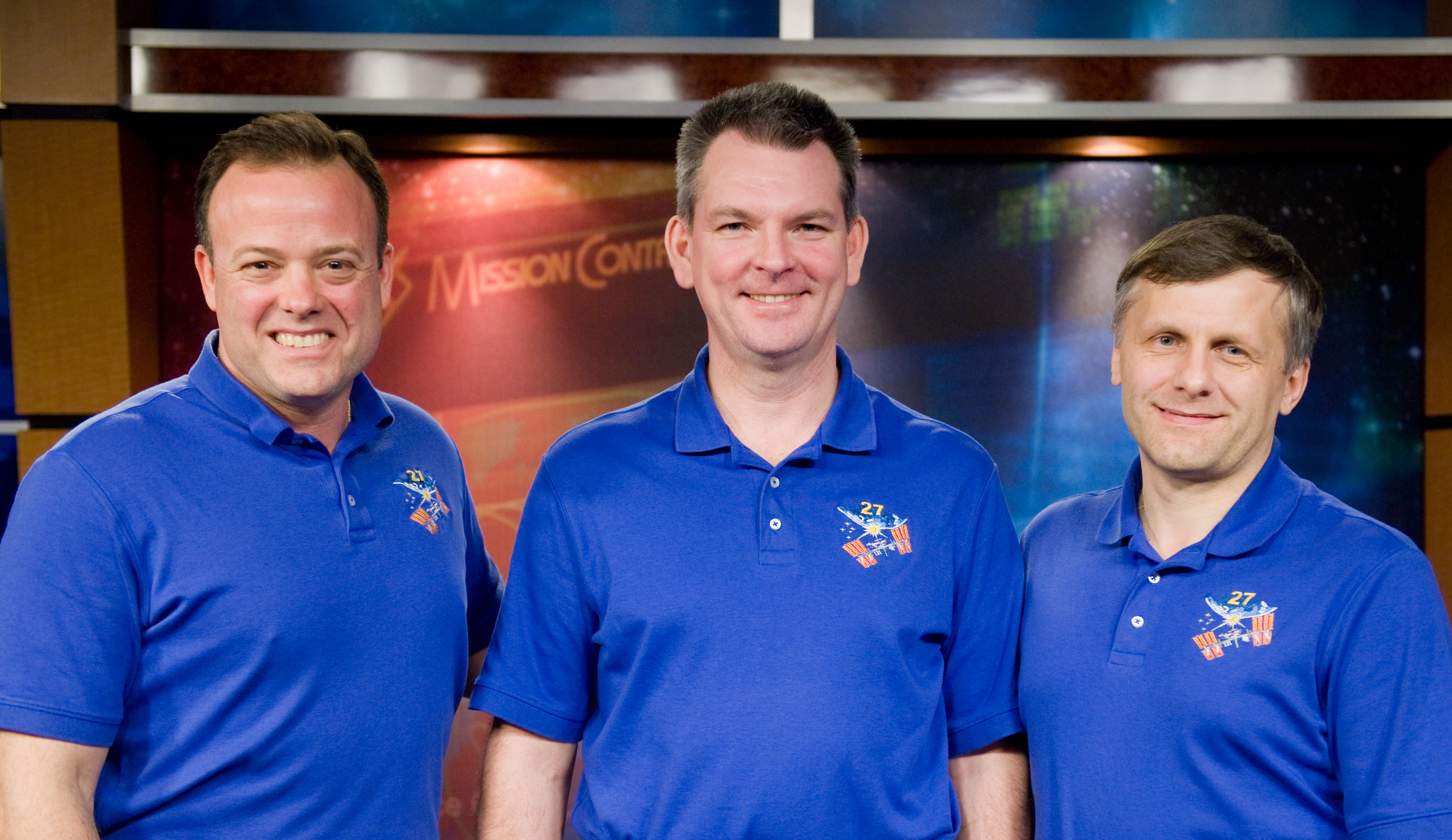
Soyuz TMA-21 crewmembers Ron Garan (left), Aleksandr Samokutyev (centre) and Borisenko (right).

On 22 May 2011 Kondratyev officially handed over command to Borisenko, with Expedition 27 officially ending with the departure of Soyuz TMA-20, carrying Kondratyev, Coleman and Nespoli back to Earth on 24 May 2011. The Expedition 28 crew would soon be joined by the crew of Soyuz TMA-02M, carrying Russian cosmonaut Sergey Volkov, JAXA astronaut Satoshi Furukawa and NASA astronaut Mike Fossum.

Borisenko concluded his stay aboard the ISS, when his spaceship, Soyuz TMA-21 undocked from the Russian segment's Poisk module at 00:38 UTC on September 16. On the same day, the Soyuz TMA-21 capsule carrying Borisenko and his two crew mates, Alexander Samokutyaev and Ron Garan touched down (3:59:39 UTC) at 93 miles southeast of the city of Zhezkazgan in Kazakhstan. During the Soyuz re-entry, repeated calls to the spacecraft from the Russian Mission Control in Korolyov, near Moscow, went unanswered for several minutes. Communication was eventually established between the crew and a plane circling the landing site.

On the ground, Borisenko appeared to be in good spirits as he flashed up an enthusiastic "thumbs-up" signal shortly after he was pulled out of the Soyuz landing capsule. He and his colleagues were carried on their chairs to a makeshift inflatable hospital for further medical check ups. After attending the traditional greeting ceremony at the airport in Karaganda, Kazakhstan, Borisenko boarded a plane to return to the training base in Star City, Russia.

=== Expedition 49/50 ===
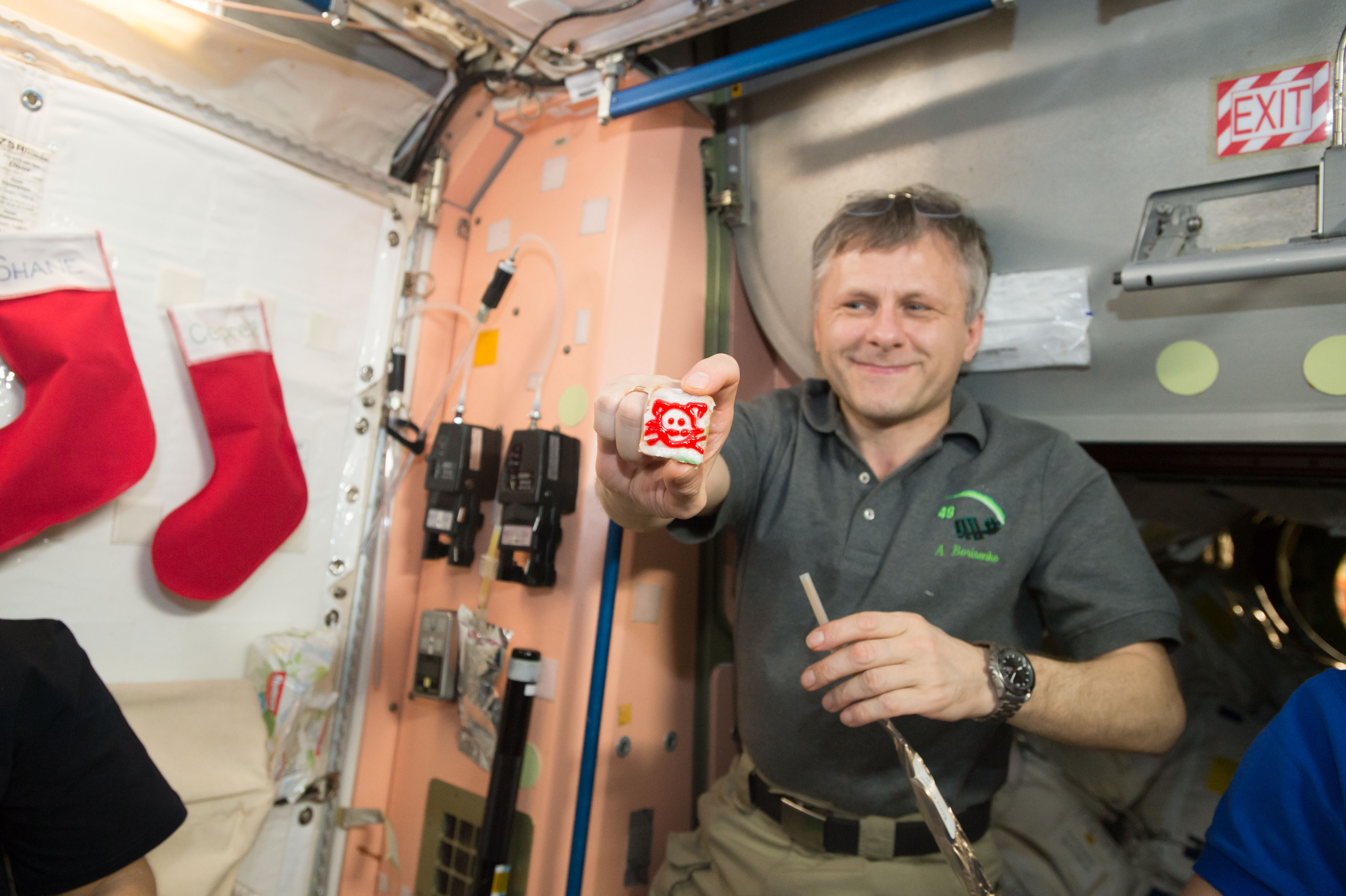
Borisenko pictured on Christmas Eve 2016

Borisenko launched for a second time on 19 October 2016 aboard Soyuz MS-02 as Flight Engineer, launch was originally scheduled for 23 September although was delayed due to technical issues with the spacecraft.

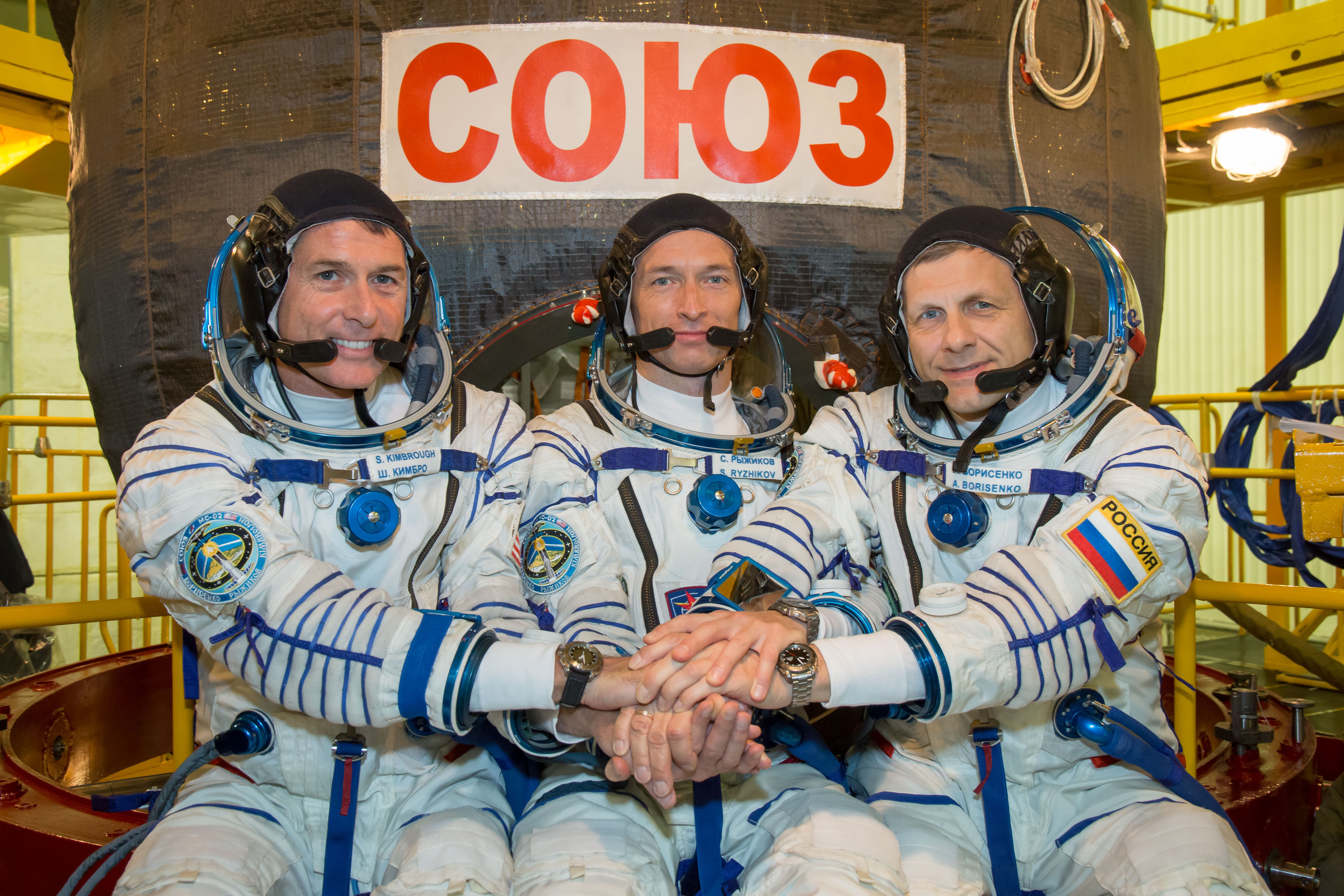
Borisenko (right), pictured with Soyuz MS-02 crew members Shane Kimbrough (left), and commander Sergey Ryzhikov (centre)

Borisenko and his two crew mates, Roscosmos cosmonaut Sergey Ryzhikov and NASA astronaut Shane Kimbrough rendezvoused and docked to the ISS on the 21st of October following a two-day rendezvous, and officially joined the Expedition 49 alongside Russian commander Anatoly Ivanishin and flight engineers Takuya Onishi of JAXA and Kathleen Rubins of NASA. Due to month long launch delay Soyuz MS-02 faced, the hand over period was short, Expedition 49 ended on 30 October 2016 when Ivanishin, Onishi and Rubins returned to Earth aboard Soyuz MS-01, leaving the MS-02 trio on board the ISS as Expedition 50 with Kimbrough taking command.

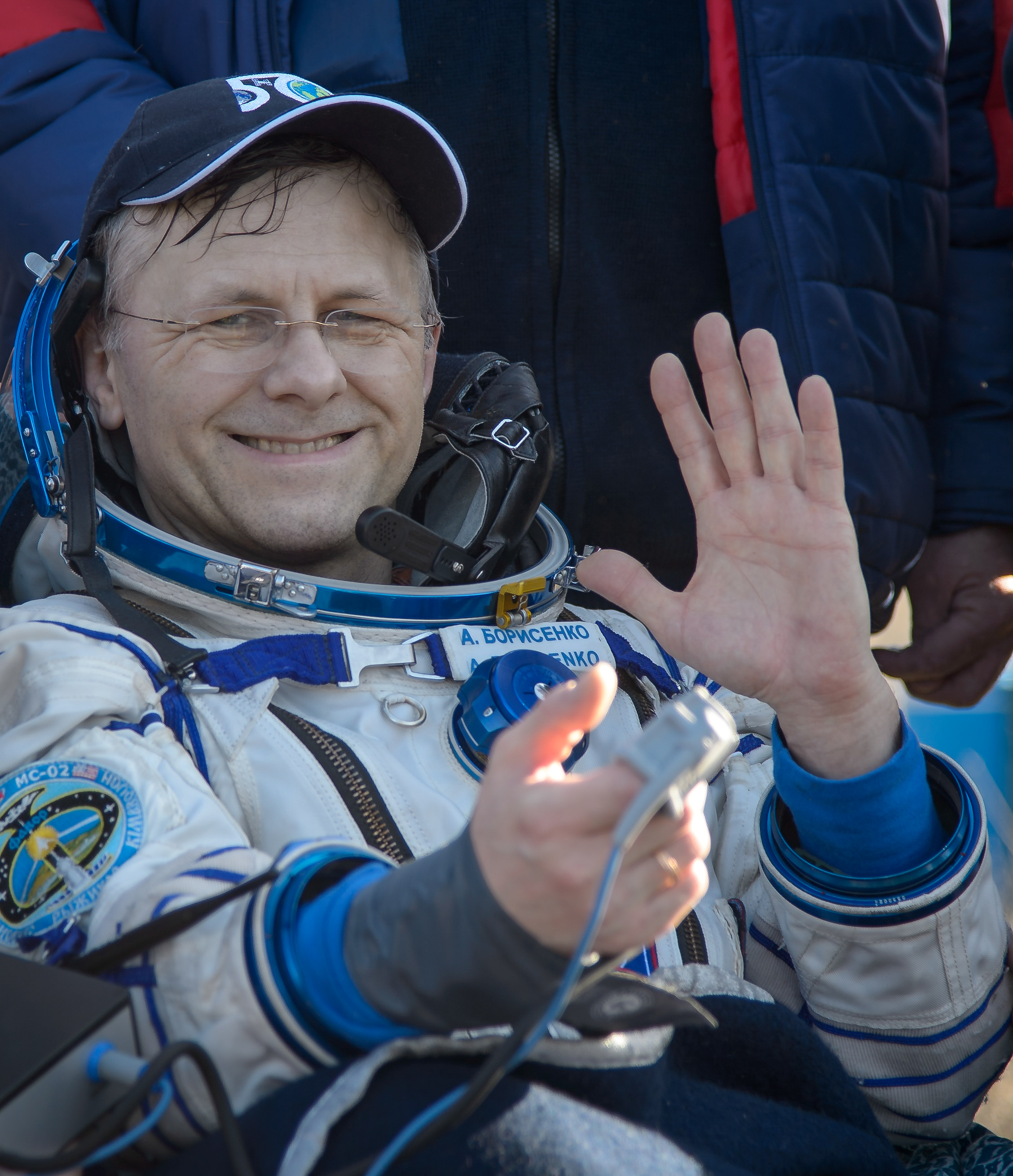
Borisenko following the landing of Soyuz MS-02.

The rest of the Expedition 50 crew joined Borisenko and his two crew mates on 19 November 2016 when Soyuz MS-03, carrying Russian cosmonaut Oleg Novitsky, French astronaut Thomas Pesquet, and NASA astronaut Peggy Whitson docked to the station. During the Expedition the Russian Orbital Segment of the ISS was supposed to welcome the Progress MS-04 uncrewed resupply spacecraft, although the spacecraft failed to reach the ISS due to an issue with the Soyuz-U launch vehicle's third stage which shutdown sooner than intended. Progress flights quickly resumed during Expedition 50, with the launch of Progress MS-05 in February 2017.

Borisenko continued to work as a flight engineer with the Expedition 50 crew until 10 April 2017, when he, Ryzhikov and Kimbrough un-docked from the ISS, officially ending Expedition 50 and starting Expedition 51. The trio safely landed on the Kazakh Steppe less than five hours later, wrapping up a 173-day spaceflight and bringing Borisenko's total time in space to 337 days.

== Film ==
In 2016, Borisenko and Mikhail Kornienko appeared as themselves in the comedy film Yolki 5.

== See also ==
- List of Heroes of the Russian Federation

Preceded by Dmitri Kondratyev	ISS Expedition Commander; 23 May to 16 September 2011	Succeeded by Michael Fossum
