= Expedition 49 =

49th expedition to the International Space Station

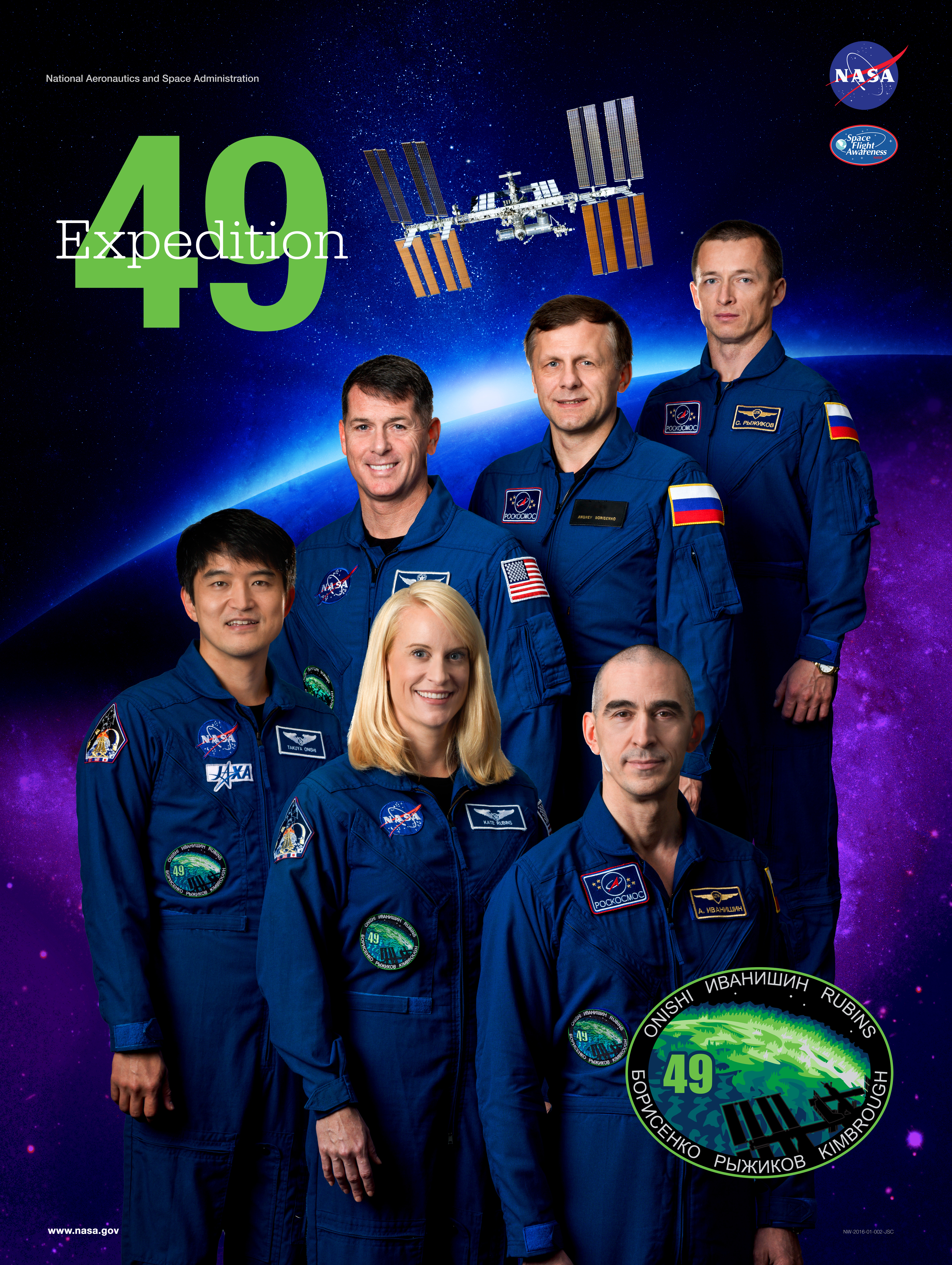
- Promotional Poster
- Mission type: Long-duration expedition

Expedition
- Space station: International Space Station
- Began: 6 September 2016 UTC
- Ended: 30 October 2016 UTC
- Arrived aboard: Soyuz MS-01; Soyuz MS-02
- Departed aboard: Soyuz MS-01; Soyuz MS-02

Crew
- Crew size: 6
- Members: Expedition 48/49: Kathleen Rubins; Anatoli Ivanishin; Takuya Onishi; Expedition 49/50: Shane Kimbrough; Andrey Borisenko; Sergey Ryzhikov
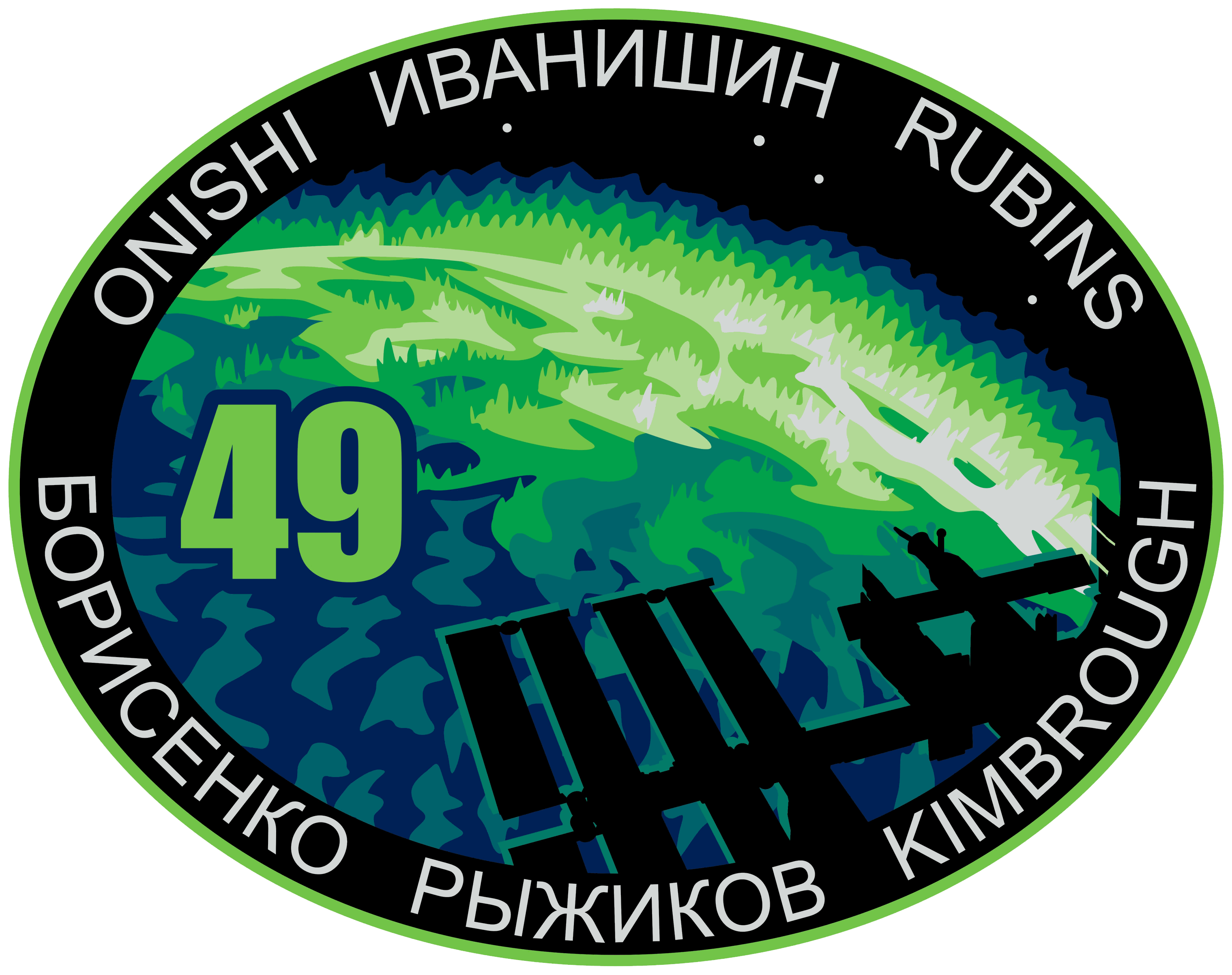
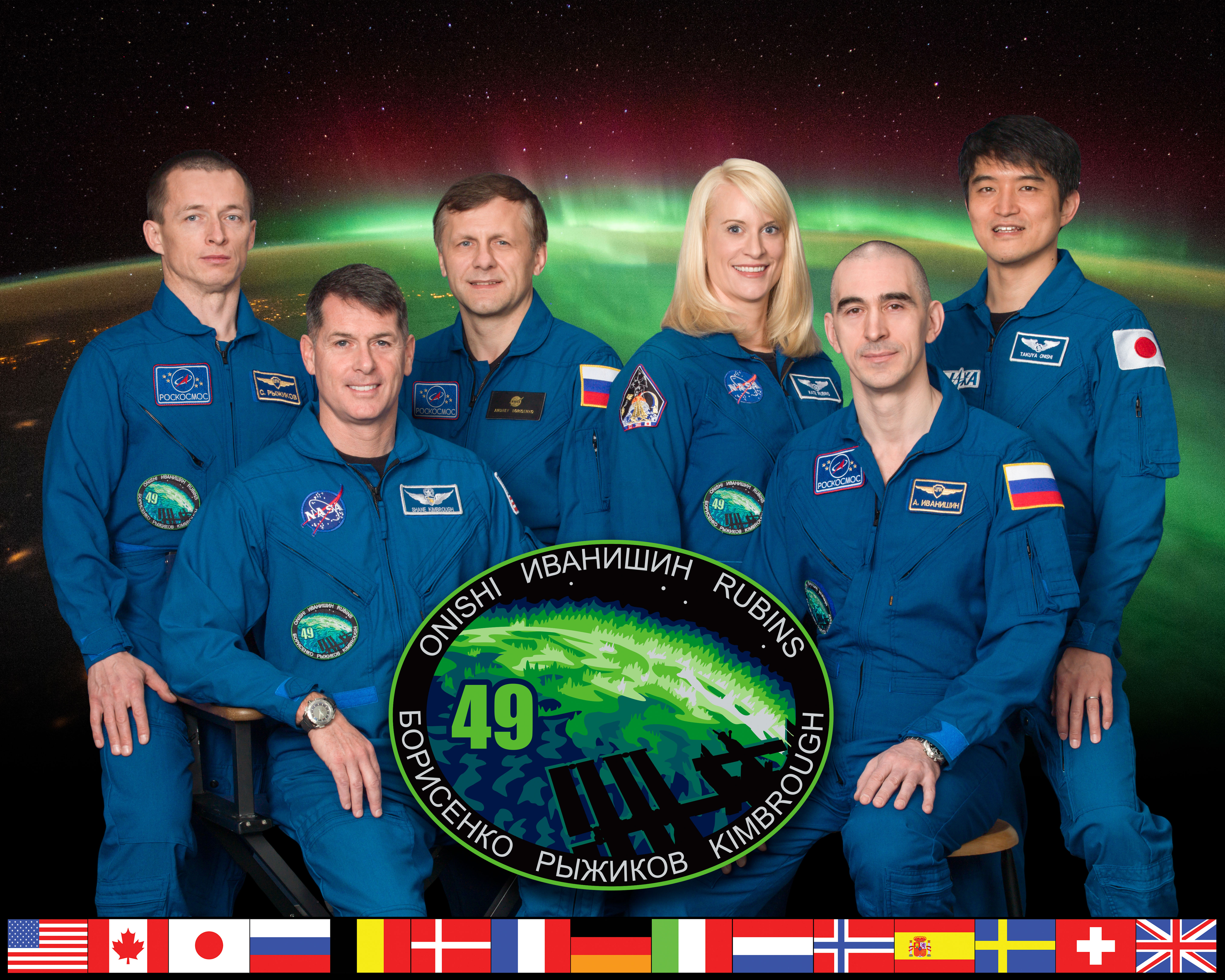
- Expedition 49 mission patch (l-r) Ryzhikov, Kimbrough, Borisenko, Rubins, Ivanishin, Onishi ISS expeditions

Expedition 49 was the 49th expedition to the International Space Station.

Anatoli Ivanishin, Kathleen Rubins and Takuya Onishi transferred from Expedition 48. Expedition 49 began upon the departure of Soyuz TMA-20M on September 6, 2016 and concluded upon the departure of Soyuz MS-01 in October 2016. The crew of Soyuz MS-02 then transferred to Expedition 50.

== Crew ==
Position	First Part (September to October 2016)	Second Part (October 2016)
Commander	Anatoli Ivanishin, RSA; Second spaceflight	
Flight engineer	Kathleen Rubins, NASA; First spaceflight	
Flight engineer	Takuya Onishi, JAXA; First spaceflight	
Flight engineer		Shane Kimbrough, NASA; Second spaceflight
Flight engineer		Andrey Borisenko, RSA; Second and last spaceflight
Flight engineer		Sergey Ryzhikov, RSA; First spaceflight

== Notes ==
One US Segment based EVA was planned for Expedition 49, this was later postponed.

A soccer ball belonging to Ellison Onizuka who was killed in the Space Shuttle Challenger disaster was brought to the ISS by Shane Kimbrough.
