= Expedition 48 =

48th expedition to the International Space Station

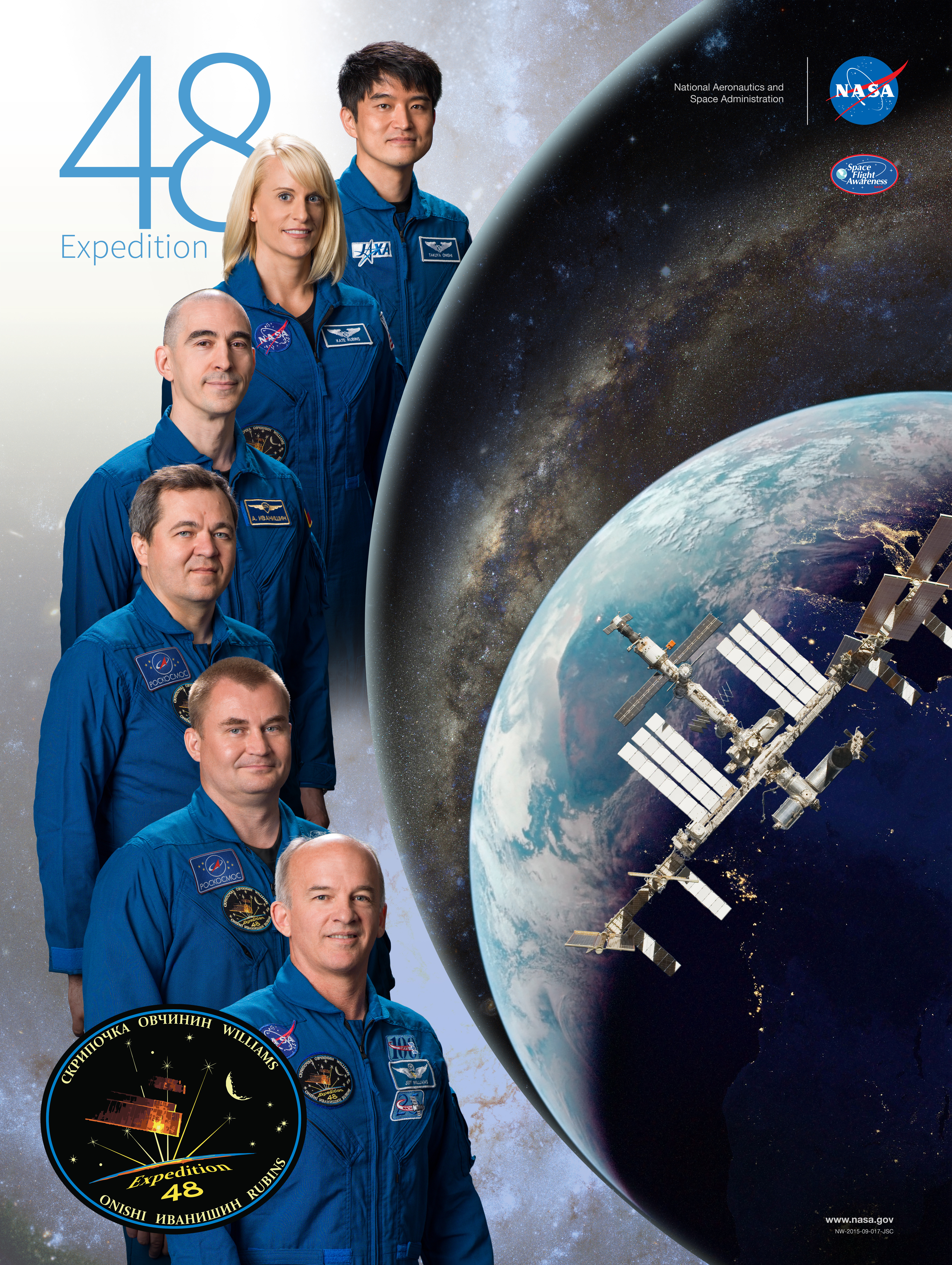
- Promotional Poster
- Mission type: Long-duration expedition

Expedition
- Space station: International Space Station
- Began: 18 June 2016 05:52 UTC
- Ended: 6 September 2016 21:51 UTC
- Arrived aboard: Soyuz TMA-20M; Soyuz MS-01
- Departed aboard: Soyuz TMA-20M; Soyuz MS-01

Crew
- Crew size: 6
- Members: Expedition 47/48: Aleksey Ovchinin; Oleg Skripochka; Jeffrey Williams; Expedition 48/49: Kathleen Rubins; Anatoli Ivanishin; Takuya Onishi
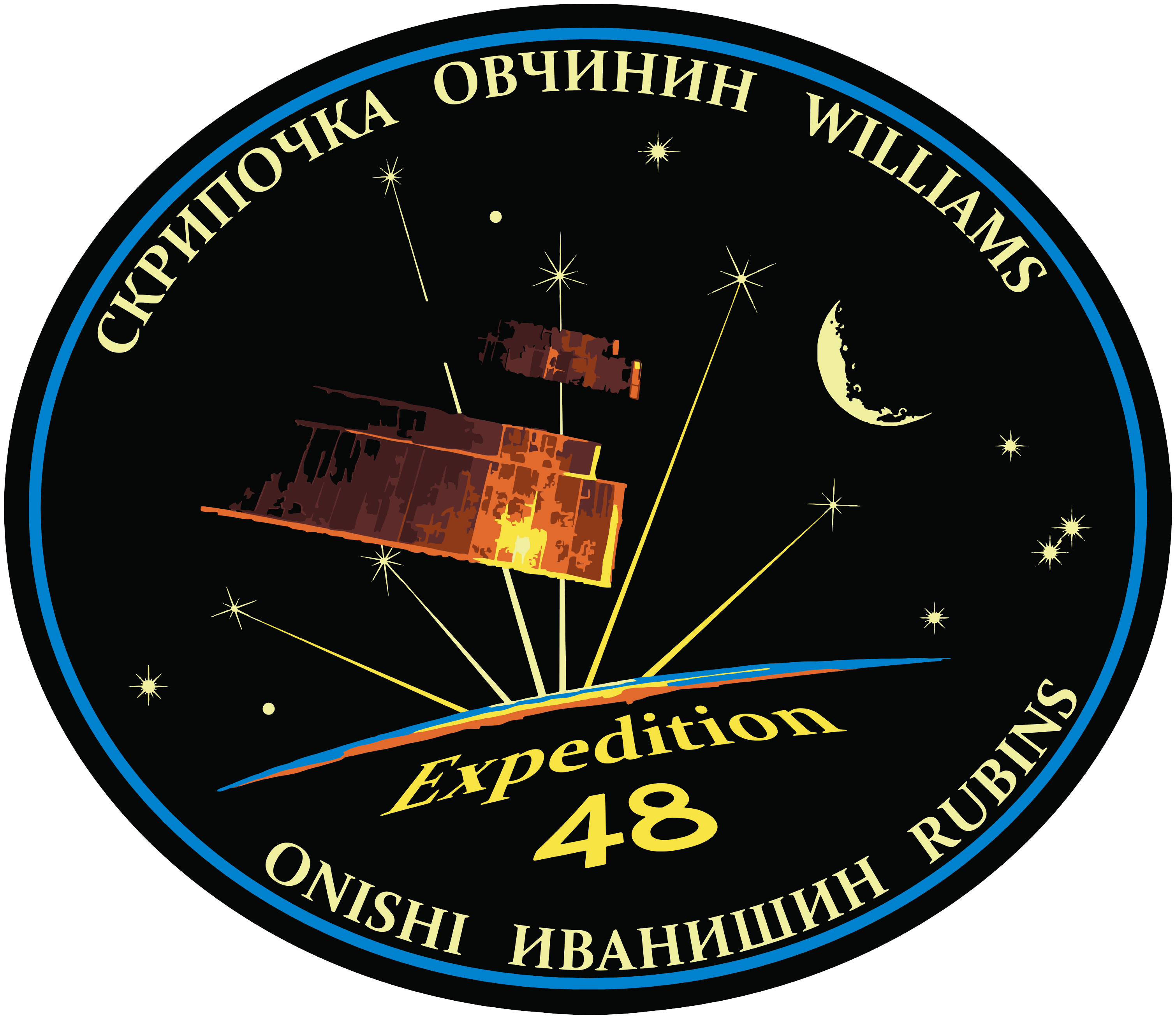
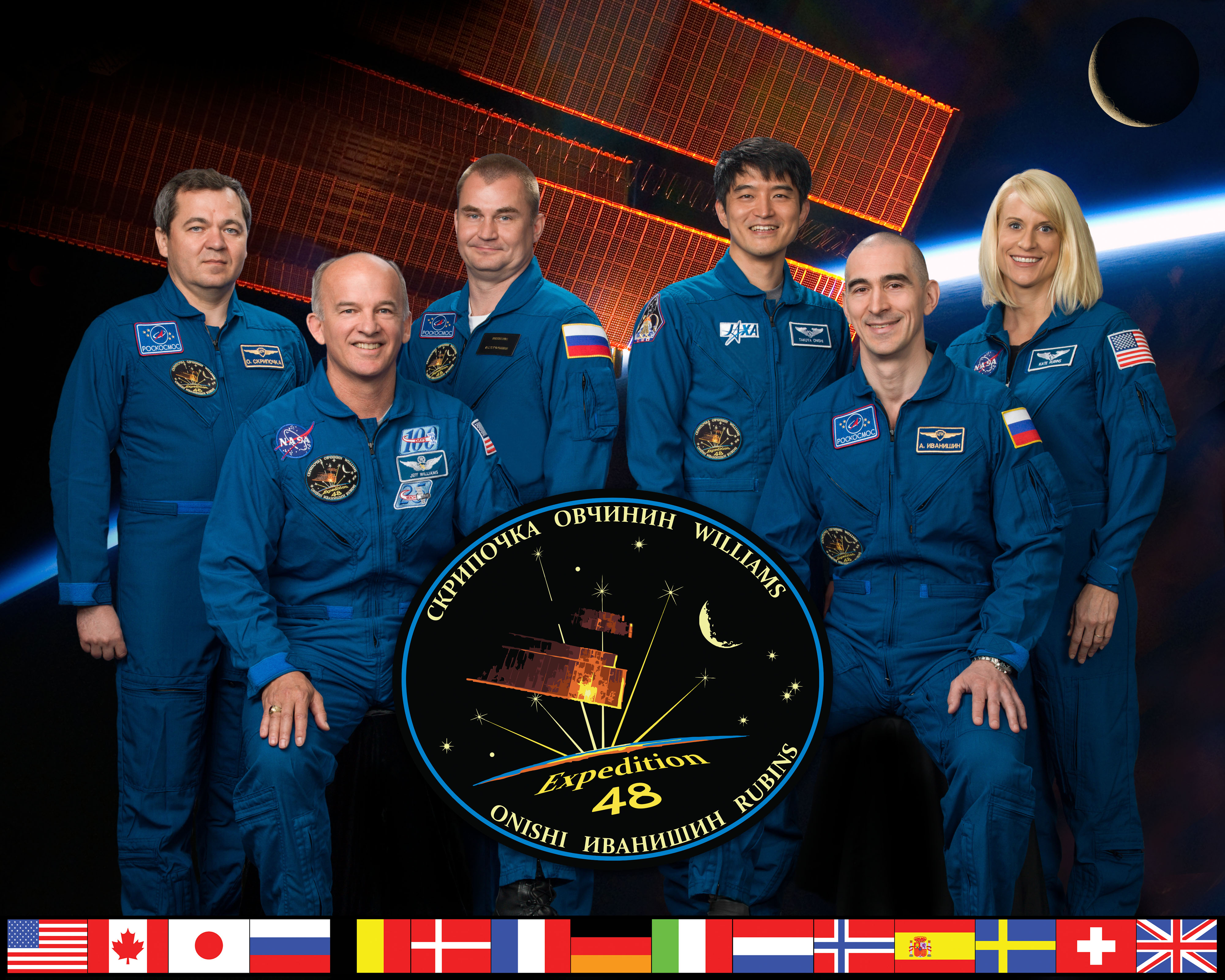
- Expedition 48 mission patch (l-r) Skripochka, Williams, Ovchinin, Onishi, Ivanishin, Rubins ISS expeditions

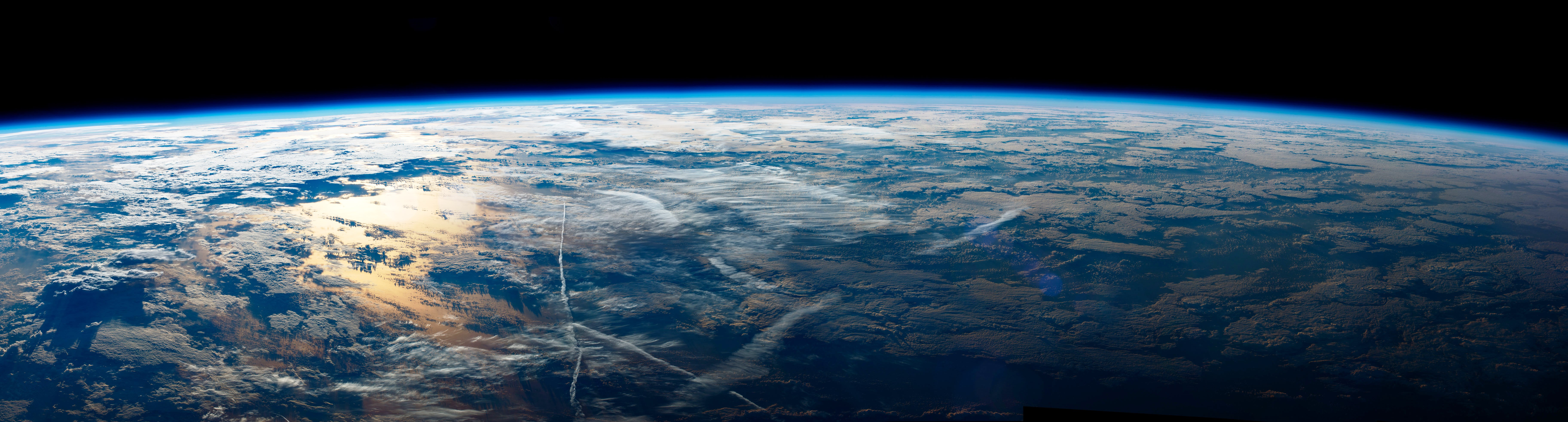
Sunrise panorama taken by Jeff Williams during Expedition 48.

Expedition 48 was the 48th expedition to the International Space Station.

Jeffrey Williams, Aleksey Ovchinin and Oleg Skripochka transferred from Expedition 47. Expedition 48 began upon the departure of Soyuz TMA-19M on 18 June 2016 and concluded upon the departure of Soyuz TMA-20M on September 6, 2016. The crew of Soyuz MS-01 were transferred to Expedition 49.

== Crew ==
Position	First Part (June 2016)	Second Part (July to September 2016)
Commander	Jeffrey Williams, NASA; Fourth and last spaceflight	
Flight engineer	Aleksey Ovchinin, RSA; First spaceflight	
Flight engineer	Oleg Skripochka, RSA; Second spaceflight	
Flight engineer		Anatoli Ivanishin, RSA; Second spaceflight
Flight engineer		Takuya Onishi, JAXA; First spaceflight
Flight engineer		Kathleen Rubins, NASA; First spaceflight

== EVA performed ==
	Spacewalkers	Start (UTC)	End (UTC)	Duration
1.	Jeff Williams; Kate Rubins	August 19, 2016; 13:04	August 19, 2016; 19:02	5 hours 58 minutes
1.	Installation of the International Docking Adapter (IDA) on Pressurized Mating Adapter-2 and installation of cables for the next IDA			
2.	Jeff Williams; Kate Rubins	September 1, 2016; 11:53	September 1, 2016; 17:41	6 hours 48 minutes
2.	The main objective of this EVA was to retract a thermal radiator on the Integrated Truss Structure segment P1. This radiator was supposed to be retracted during Expedition 45's EVA 2 (November 6, 2015) but was not completed. The radiator had been deployed on Expedition 33's EVA 1 (November 1, 2012) in an attempt to isolate a coolant leak. Additional completed tasks included installing HD video cameras on the port/outboard side of the station (one zenith, one nadir), applying additional torque to SARJ bolts, photographing the inside of the SARJ, tying back a protective blanket covering hardware which will be robotically manipulate later, and tying back Crew and Equipment Translation Aid (CETA) Cart brake handles to keep them out of the SARJ rotation envelope.			
