= Soyuz MS-02 =

2016 Russian crewed spaceflight to the ISS

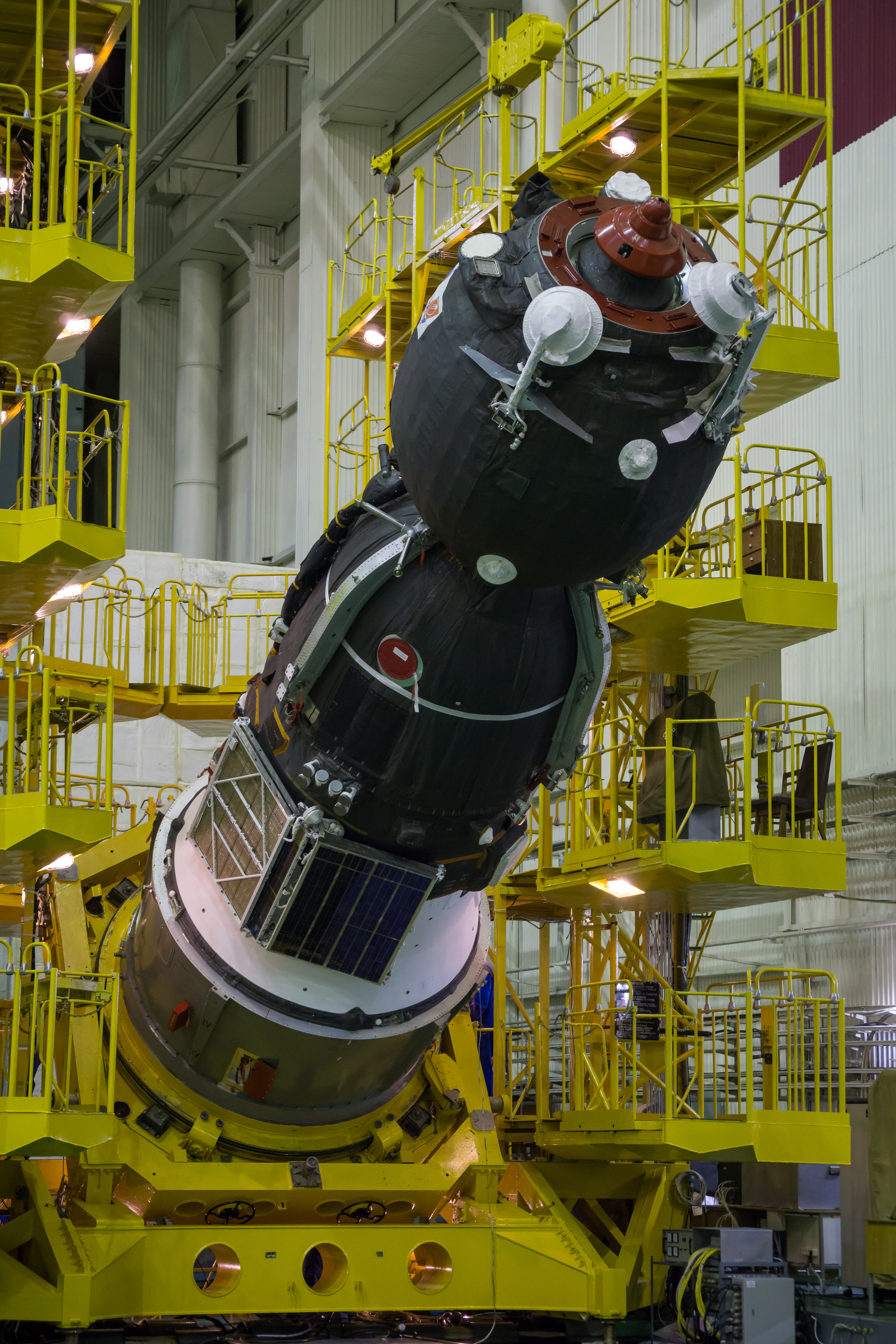
- Soyuz MS-02 during preflight checks
- Mission type: ISS crew transport
- Operator: Roscosmos
- COSPAR ID: 2016-063A
- SATCAT no.: 41820
- Mission duration: 173 days 3 hours 16 minutes 21 seconds
- Distance travelled: 118 million kilometers
- Orbits completed: 2,768

Spacecraft properties
- Spacecraft: Soyuz MS
- Spacecraft type: Soyuz MS 11F732A48
- Manufacturer: Energia
- Launch mass: 7080 kg

Crew
- Crew size: 3
- Members: Sergey Ryzhikov; Andrey Borisenko; Shane Kimbrough
- Callsign: Favor

Start of mission
- Launch date: 19 October 2016, 08:05:00 UTC
- Rocket: Soyuz-FG
- Launch site: Baikonur, Site 31
- Contractor: RKTs Progress

End of mission
- Landing date: 10 April 2017, 11:20 UTC
- Landing site: Steppes of the Kazakhstan

Orbital parameters
- Reference system: Geocentric orbit
- Regime: Low Earth orbit
- Inclination: 51.66°

Docking with ISS
- Docking port: Poisk zenith
- Docking date: 21 October 2016, 09:52 UTC
- Undocking date: 10 April 2017, 07:57 UTC
- Time docked: 171 days
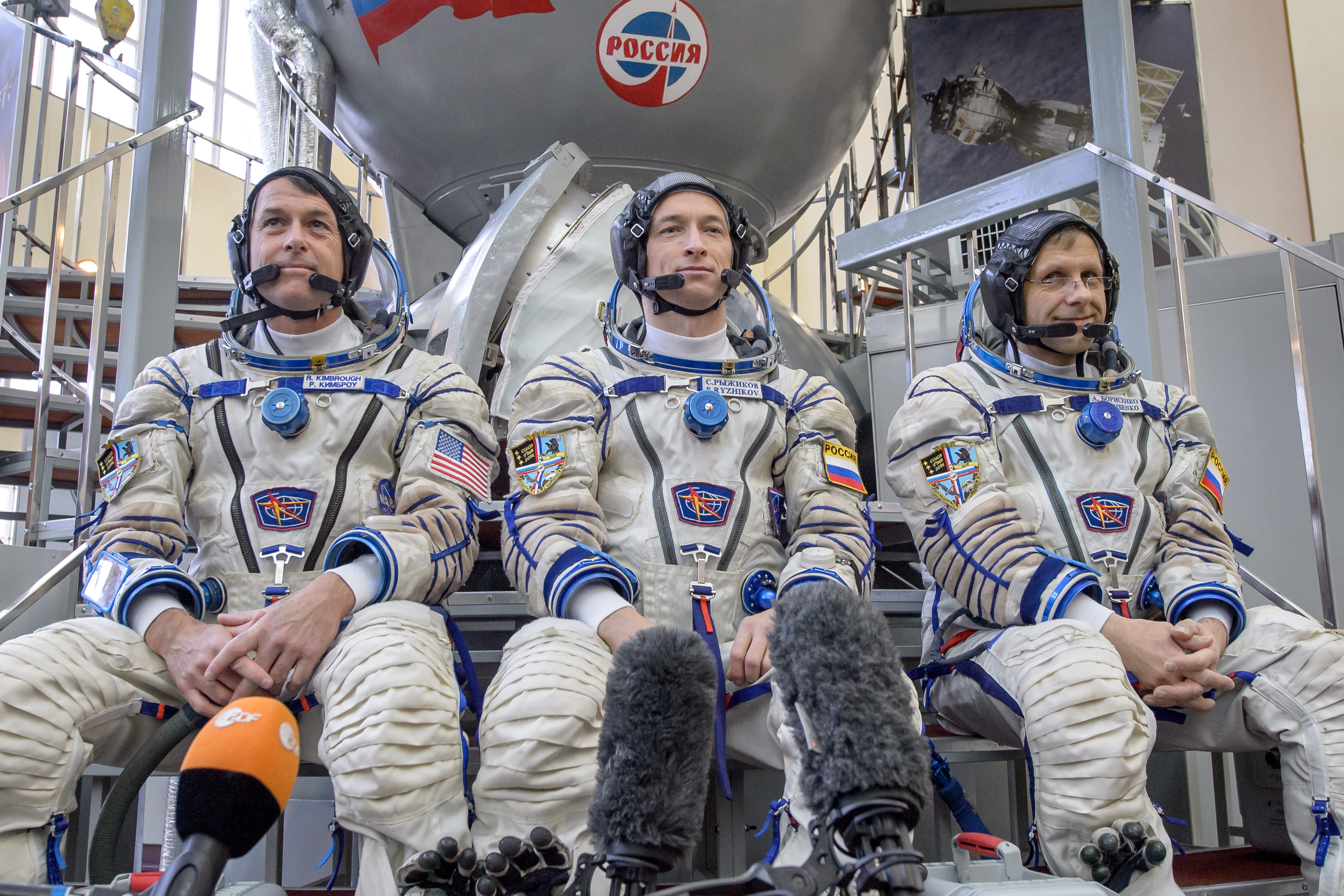
- Mission insignia (l-r) Kimbrough, Ryzhikov and Borisenko Soyuz programme (crewed)

Soyuz MS-02 was a 2016 Soyuz spaceflight that was planned for a 23 September 2016 launch, but because of technical difficulties it launched on 19 October 2016. It transported three members of the Expedition 49 crew to orbit and docked with the International Space Station. Soyuz MS-02 was the 131st flight of a Soyuz spacecraft. The crew consisted of a Russian commander and flight engineer, as well as an American flight engineer. Soyuz MS-02 docked with Poisk (MRM-2) module on 21 October 2016.

Soyuz MS-02 returned to Earth on 10 April 2017. During its descent, the capsule was partially depressurized when the main parachute deployed. The landing occurred at 11:20 UTC. The total flight duration was 173 days.

== Partial depressurization ==
During the final stage of its descent, Soyuz MS-02 suffered a partial depressurization about eight kilometers above the ground. When the main parachute was deployed, a buckle that was part of the deployment system struck a welding seam, partially depressurizing the capsule. The depressurization did not put the crew in danger as they were at a relatively safe height within the atmosphere when it occurred. Russian officials believe that the way the parachute was packed caused the buckle to strike the capsule.

== Crew ==
Prime crew
Position	Crew
Commander	(Russia) Sergey Ryzhikov, Roscosmos; Expedition 49; First spaceflight
Flight engineer	(Russia) Andrey Borisenko, Roscosmos; Expedition 49; Second and last spaceflight
Flight engineer	(United States) Shane Kimbrough, NASA; Expedition 49; Second spaceflight

Backup crew
Position	Crew
Commander	(Russia) Alexander Misurkin, Roscosmos
Flight engineer	(Russia) Nikolai Tikhonov, Roscosmos
Flight engineer	(United States) Mark T. Vande Hei, NASA
