= Soyuz MS-01 =

2016 Russian crewed spaceflight to the ISS

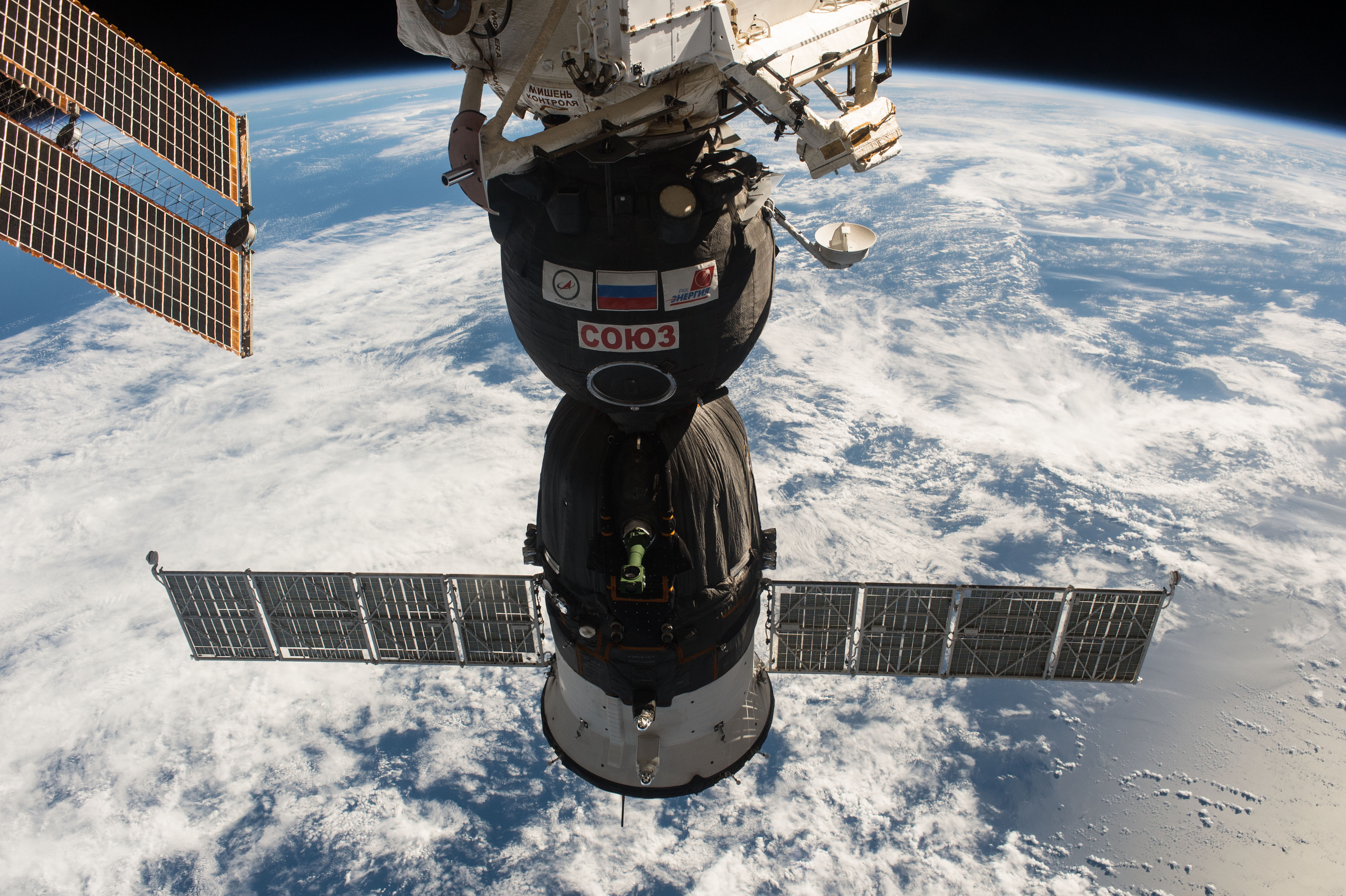
- Soyuz MS-01 docked to the ISS.
- Mission type: ISS crew transport
- Operator: Roscosmos
- COSPAR ID: 2016-044A
- SATCAT no.: 41639
- Mission duration: 115 days 2 hours 22 minutes

Spacecraft properties
- Spacecraft: Soyuz MS
- Spacecraft type: Soyuz-MS 11F732A48
- Manufacturer: Energia
- Launch mass: 7080 kg

Crew
- Crew size: 3
- Members: Anatoli Ivanishin; Takuya Onishi; Kathleen Rubins
- Callsign: Irkut

Start of mission
- Launch date: 7 July 2016, 01:36 UTC
- Rocket: Soyuz-FG
- Launch site: Baikonur, Site 1/5
- Contractor: RKTs Progress

End of mission
- Landing date: 30 October 2016, 03:58 UTC
- Landing site: Steppe of Kazakhstan

Orbital parameters
- Reference system: Geocentric orbit
- Regime: Low Earth orbit
- Inclination: 51.66°

Docking with ISS
- Docking port: Rassvet nadir
- Docking date: 9 July 2016, 04:12 UTC
- Undocking date: 30 October 2016 00:35 UTC
- Time docked: 113 days
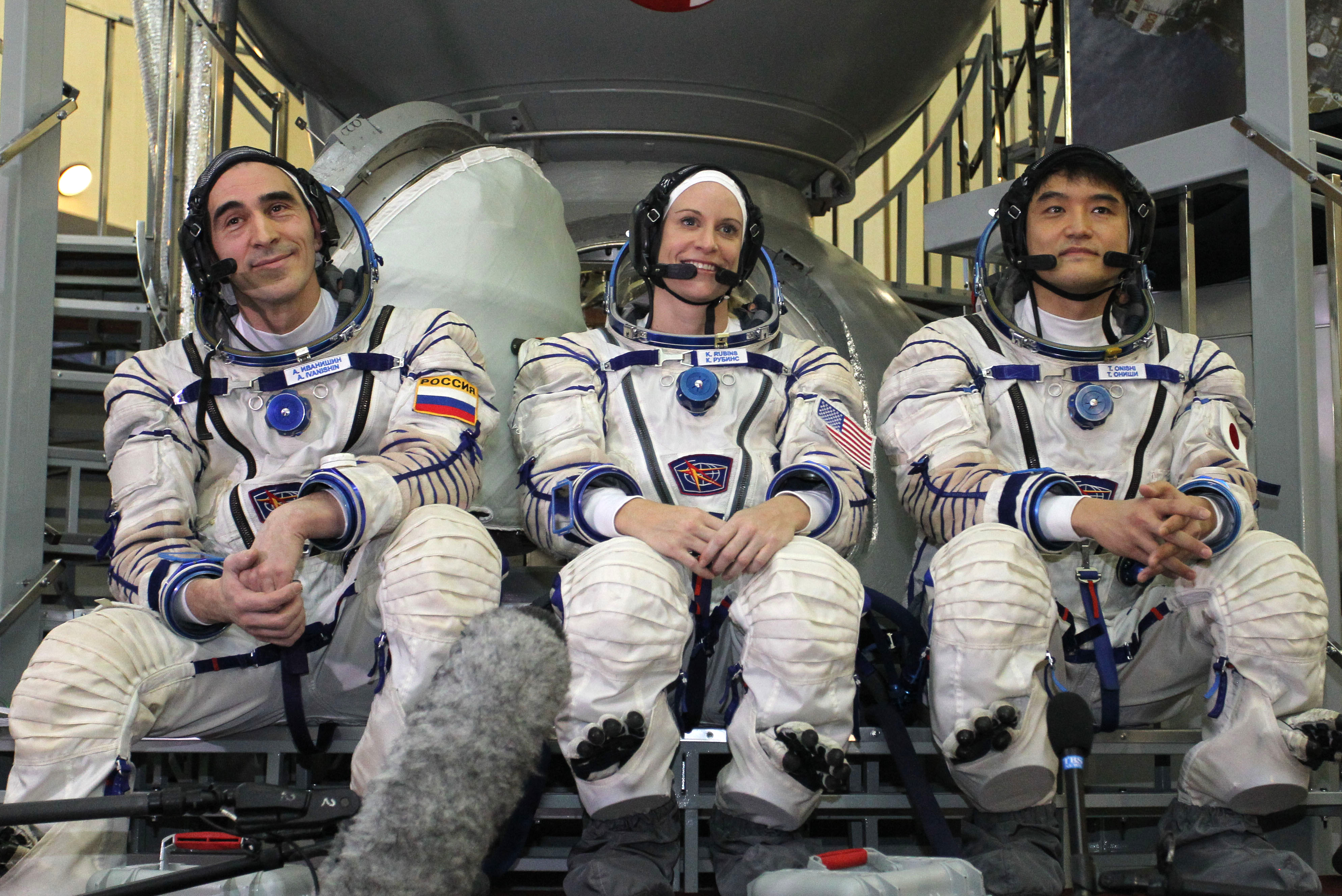
- Mission insignia (l-r) Ivanishin, Rubins and Onishi Soyuz programme (crewed)

Soyuz MS-01 was a 2016 Soyuz spaceflight to the International Space Station. Originally scheduled for launch in June 2016, the mission successfully lifted off from Kazakhstan on 7 July 2016. It transported three members of the Expedition 48 crew to the International Space Station. Soyuz MS-01 is the 130th flight of a Soyuz spacecraft, and the first with the new version Soyuz MS. The crew consisted of a Russian commander, a Japanese flight engineer, and an American flight engineer.

On 6 June 2016, the launch was rescheduled to July 2016 due to flaws in the control system that could affect the docking to the ISS. The spacecraft was successfully docked on 9 July 2016 and returned to Earth on 30 October 2016.

== Crew ==
Position	
Commander	(Russia) Anatoli Ivanishin, Roscosmos; Expedition 48; Second spaceflight
Flight engineer	(Japan) Takuya Onishi, JAXA; Expedition 48; First spaceflight
Flight engineer	(United States) Kathleen Rubins, NASA; Expedition 48; First spaceflight

=== Backup crew ===
Position	
Commander	(Russia) Oleg Novitskiy, Roscosmos
Flight engineer	(France) Thomas Pesquet, ESA
Flight engineer	(United States) Peggy Whitson, NASA
