= Takuya Onishi =

Japanese astronaut, engineer and pilot (born 1975)

- 大西 卓哉
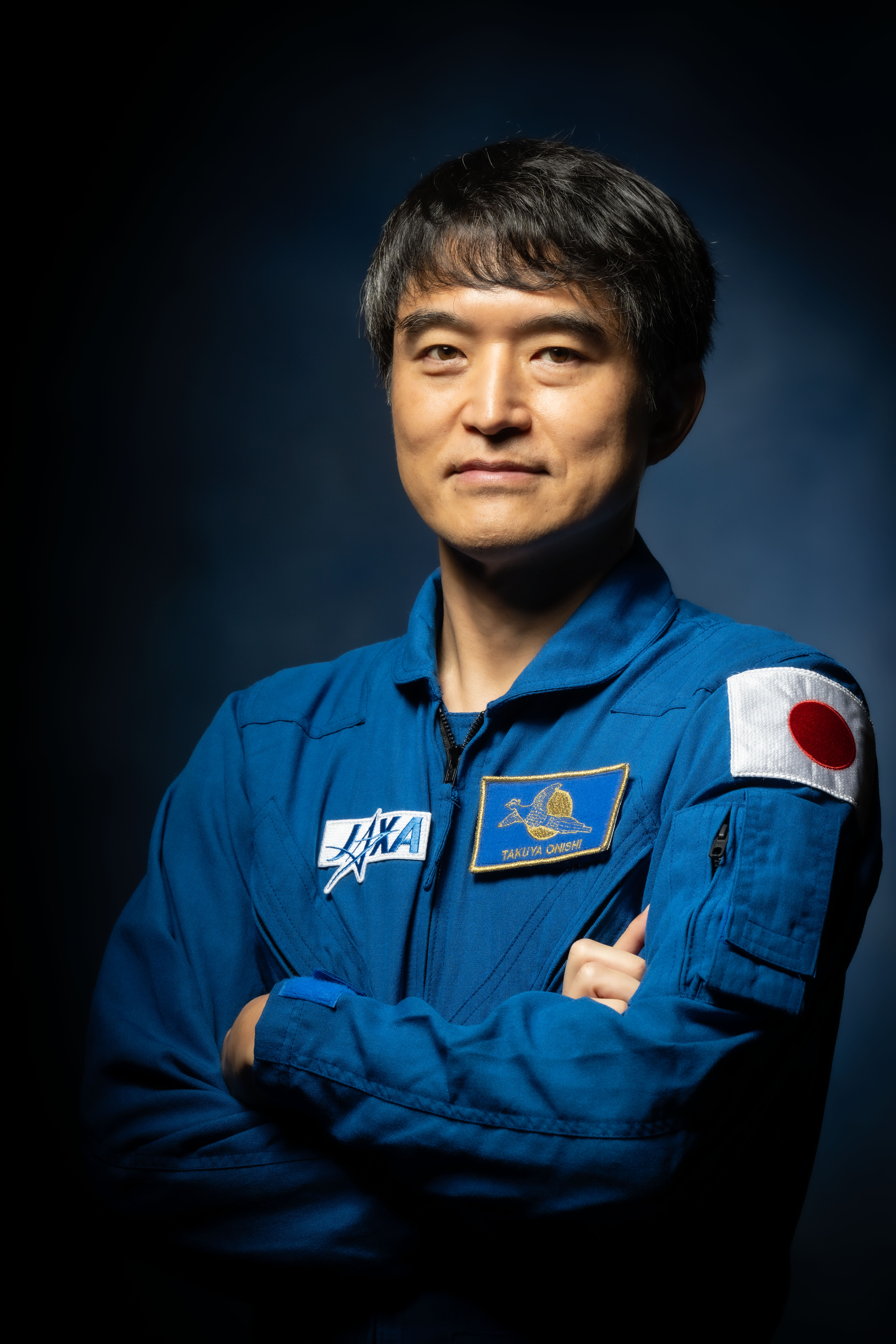
- Ōnishi in 2024
- Born: 22 December 1975 (age 50); Nerima, Tokyo, Japan
- Education: University of Tokyo (BEng)
- Space career

JAXA astronaut
- Previous occupation: Pilot, All Nippon Airways
- Status: Active
- Time in space: 262 days, 18 hours, 51 minutes
- Selection: 2009 JAXA Group; NASA Group 20 (2009)
- Missions: Soyuz MS-01 (Expedition 48/49); SpaceX Crew-10 (Expedition 72/73)
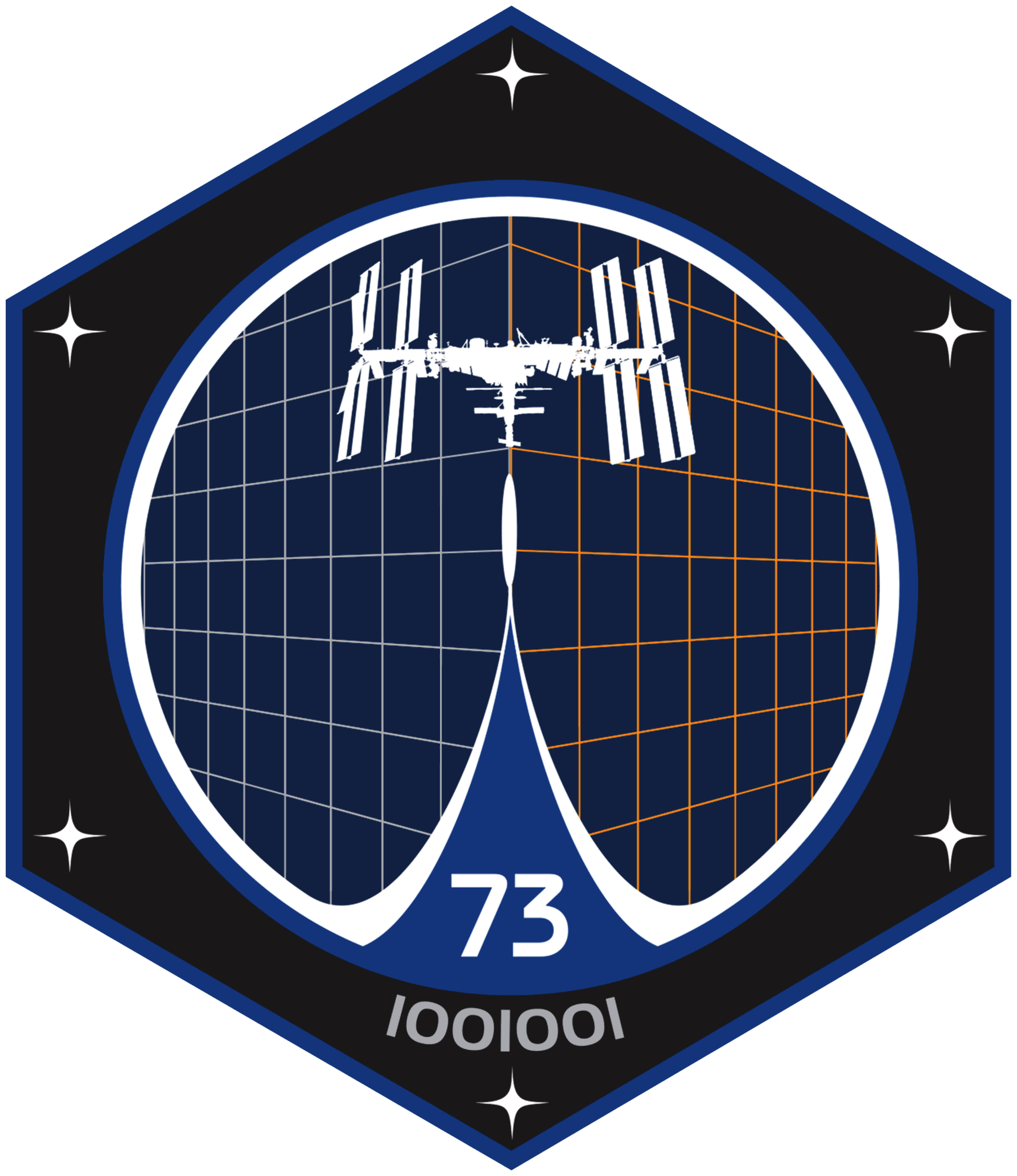
- Mission insignia

Takuya Onishi (Japanese: 大西 卓哉, Hepburn: Ōnishi Takuya; born 22 December 1975) is a Japanese astronaut selected for the Japan Aerospace Exploration Agency (JAXA) in 2009. He spent four months on board the International Space Station in 2016. In March 2025, he arrived at the ISS as part of Expedition 72/73.

== Early life ==
Onishi was born in Nerima, Tokyo, Japan on 22 December 1975. He graduated from Seiko Gakuin High School in Yokohama in 1994 and received a Bachelor of Engineering degree in Aeronautical and Space Engineering from the University of Tokyo in 1998. He joined All Nippon Airways (ANA) in 1998 and was assigned to the Passenger Service Department, Haneda airport, Tokyo, where he was a check-in agent and assisted disabled people in boarding.

== Career in aviation ==
Onishi completed two years of basic flight training in Bakersfield, California and one year of advanced flight training in Tokyo. He was hired by All Nippon Airways as a first officer on Boeing 767 airplanes in October 2003, flying both domestic and international routes.

== JAXA career ==
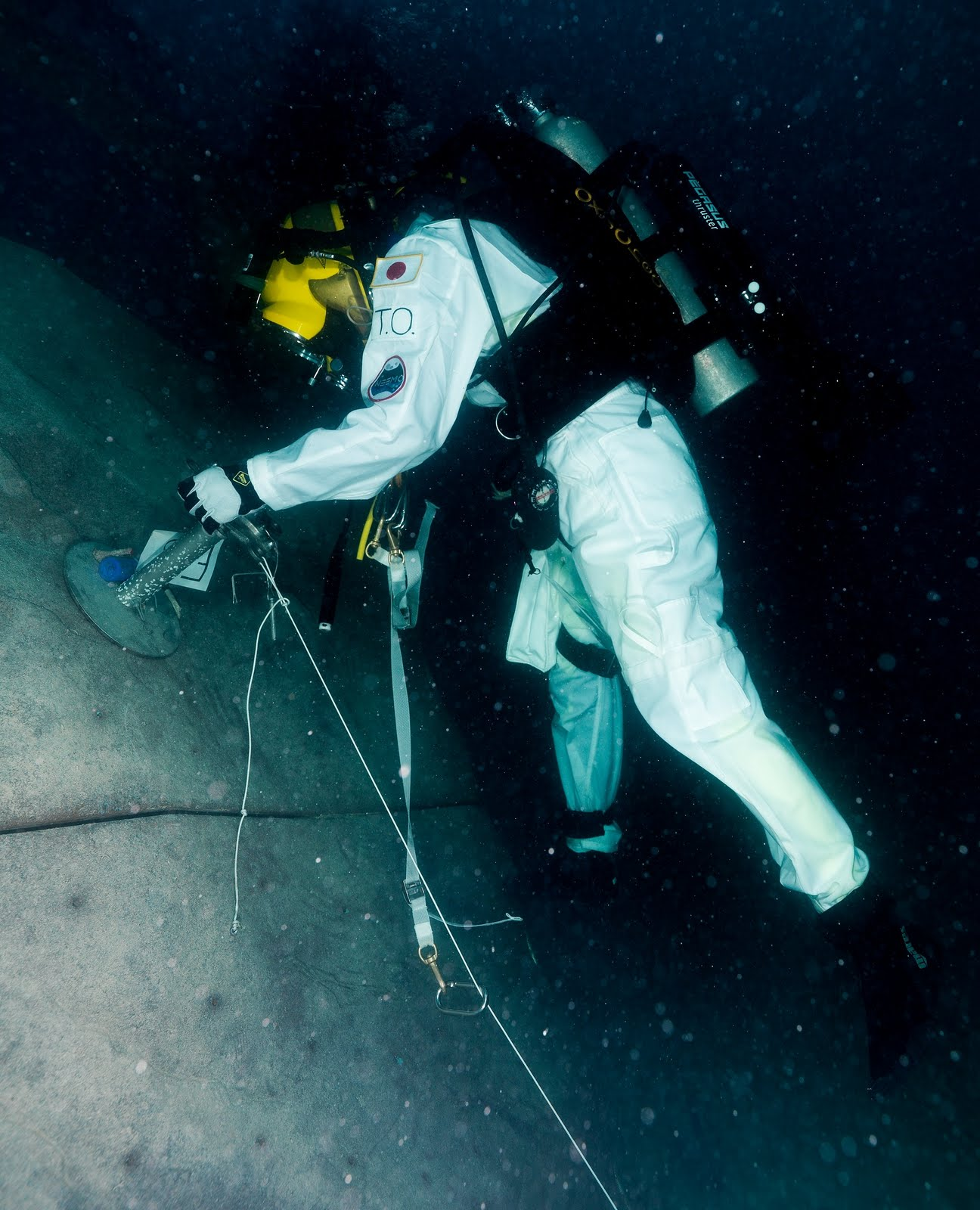
Onishi performing EVA on simulated asteroid during NEEMO 15 mission.

In February 2009, Onishi was selected by the Japanese Aerospace Exploration Agency (JAXA) as one of the Japanese astronaut candidates for the International Space Station (ISS). Starting in April 2009, he attended the ISS Astronaut Basic Training domestic program at Tsukuba Space Center in Japan.

Onishi arrived at NASA's Johnson Space Center in Houston, Texas, in August 2009. As one of the fourteen members of the 20th NASA astronaut class, he took part in an Astronaut Candidate Training program that included scientific and technical briefings, intensive instruction in ISS systems, Extravehicular Activity (EVA), robotics, physiological training, T-38 Talon flight training, and water and wilderness survival training.

Having completed his training as an astronaut, Onishi was given the opportunity to fly to the International Space Station and engage in scientific experiments at the Japanese Experiment Module space laboratory, as well as in the maintenance and operations of the station.

Onishi joined International Space Station Expedition 48/49 as a crew member. The mission successfully launched on July 6, 2016, and Onishi was expected to spend four months at the ISS. He returned to Earth after 115 days in space.

On September 19, 2011, NASA announced that Onishi would serve as an aquanaut aboard the Aquarius underwater laboratory during the NEEMO 15 undersea exploration mission from October 17–30, 2011. Delayed by stormy weather and high seas, the mission began on October 20, 2011. On the afternoon of October 21, Onishi and his crewmates officially became aquanauts, having spent over 24 hours underwater. NEEMO 15 ended early on October 26 due to the approach of Hurricane Rina.

In 2019, Onishi participated, with the colleagues Jeanette Epps, Joe Acaba, Alexander Gerst, Nikolai Chub, and Joshua Kutryk, in the ESA CAVES training organized by the European Space Agency and held between Italy and Slovenia, becoming a "cavenaut".

In 2023, Onishi participated in the ESA PANGAEA training organized by the European Space Agency, held between Italy (Bletterbach canyon), Germany (Noerdlingen-Ries crater) and Spain (Lanzarote Island), together with colleagues Thomas Pesquet and Jessica Wittner.

On 14 March 2025, he joined the SpaceX Crew-10 mission to the International Space Station as part of Expedition 72/73.

== Honors ==
Asteroid 163153 Takuyaonishi, discovered by Japanese astronomer Akimasa Nakamura at the Kuma Kogen Astronomical Observatory in 2002, was named in his honor. The official naming citation was published by the Minor Planet Center on 18 February 2011 (M.P.C. 73984).

== Personal life ==
Onishi enjoys flying, playing the saxophone, movies, and hiking.

Preceded by Aleksey Ovchinin	ISS Commander (Expedition 73); 18 April to 5 August 2025	Succeeded by Sergey Ryzhikov
