= Expedition 51 =

51st long duration stay in the International space station

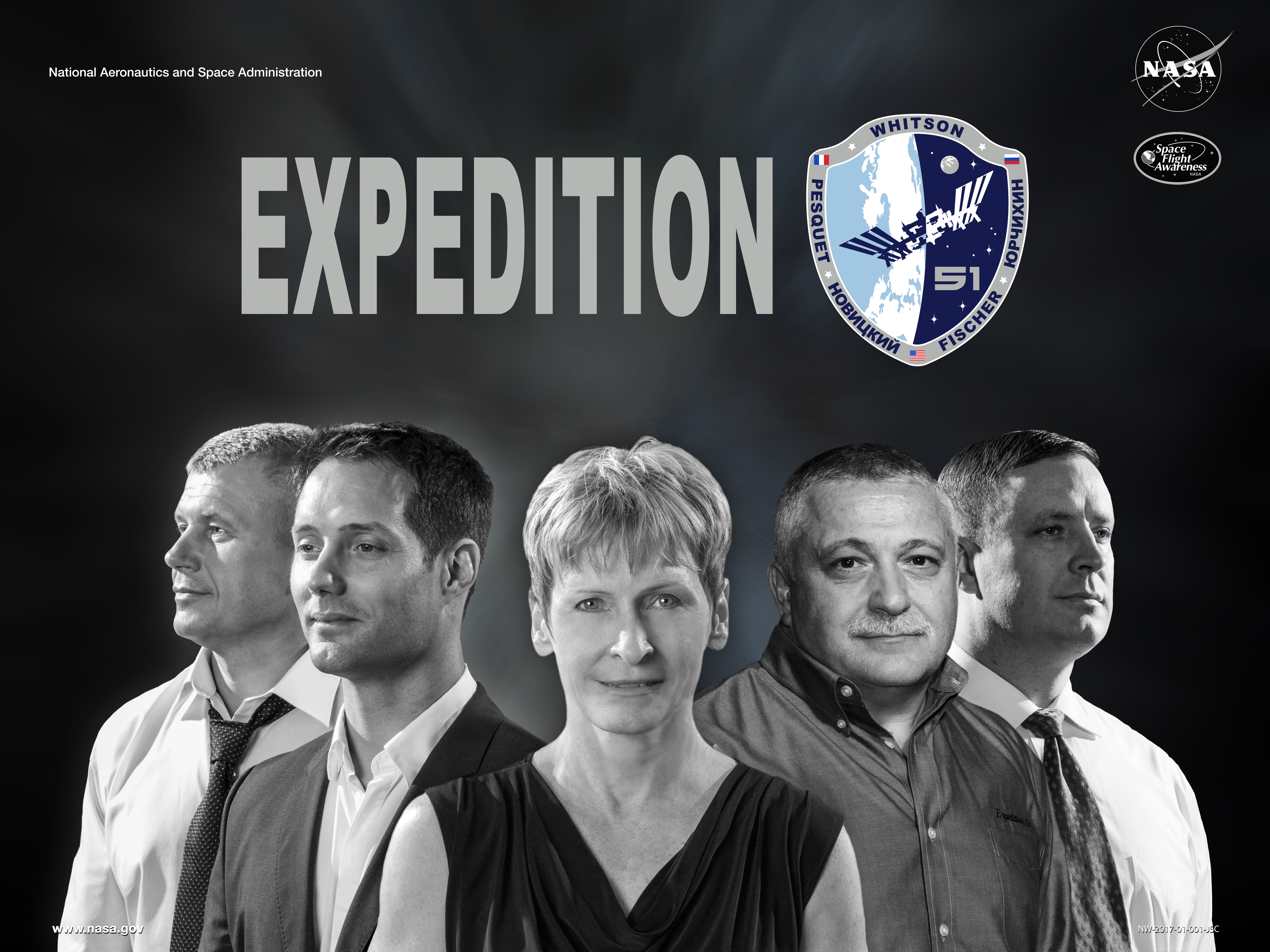
- Promotional Poster
- Mission type: Long-duration expedition

Expedition
- Space station: International Space Station
- Began: 10 April 2017 UTC
- Ended: 2 June 2017 UTC
- Arrived aboard: Soyuz MS-03; Soyuz MS-04
- Departed aboard: Soyuz MS-03; Soyuz MS-04

Crew
- Crew size: 5
- Members: Expedition 50/51: Oleg Novitsky; Thomas Pesquet; Expedition 51/52: Fyodor Yurchikhin; Jack Fischer; Expedition 50/51/52; Peggy Whitson
- EVAs: 2
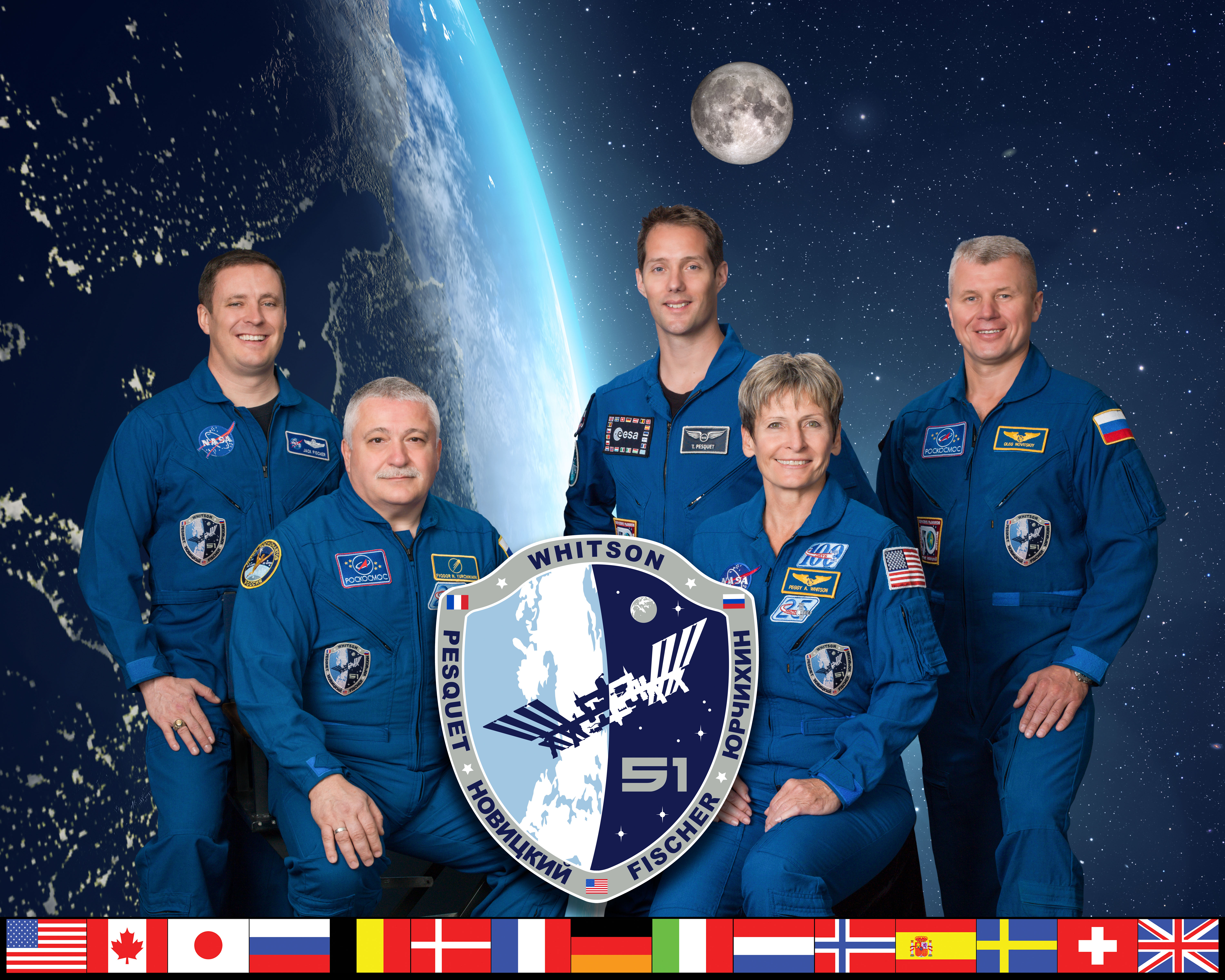
- Expedition 51 mission patch (l-r) Fischer, Yurchikhin, Pesquet, Whitson, Novitskiy ISS expeditions

Expedition 51 (April – June 2017) was the 51st expedition to the International Space Station, which began upon the departure of Soyuz MS-02 on April 10, 2017, and concluded upon the departure of Soyuz MS-03 on June 2, 2017. Peggy Whitson, Oleg Novitskiy and Thomas Pesquet were transferred from Expedition 50, with Peggy Whitson taking the commander role. She is the first woman to command two expeditions to the ISS, having previously commanded Expedition 16.

Due to a decision to cut down the number of participating Russian cosmonauts in 2017, only two cosmonauts were launched on Soyuz MS-04 on April 20, 2017 - bringing the total crew number to five. Transfer of Command from Expedition 51 to Expedition 52 was done on June 1, 2017. Expedition 51 officially ended on June 2, 2017, 10:47 UTC, with the undocking of Soyuz MS-03.

== Crew ==
Position	First Part (April 2017)	Second Part (April to June 2017)
Commander	Peggy A. Whitson, NASA; Third (last NASA) spaceflight	
Flight engineer	Oleg Novitsky, RSA; Second spaceflight	
Flight engineer	Thomas Pesquet, ESA; First spaceflight	
Flight engineer		Fyodor Yurchikhin, RSA; Fifth and last spaceflight
Flight engineer		Jack D. Fischer, NASA; Only spaceflight

== Mission overview ==
=== Expedition 50/51 launch and docking ===
Soyuz MS-03 launched on November 17, 2016, transporting Oleg Novitskiy, Peggy Whitson and Thomas Pesquet. MS-03 docked with the Rassvet module on November 19, 2016.

=== April 2017 - Expedition 51 begins ===
==== Prep for visitors ====
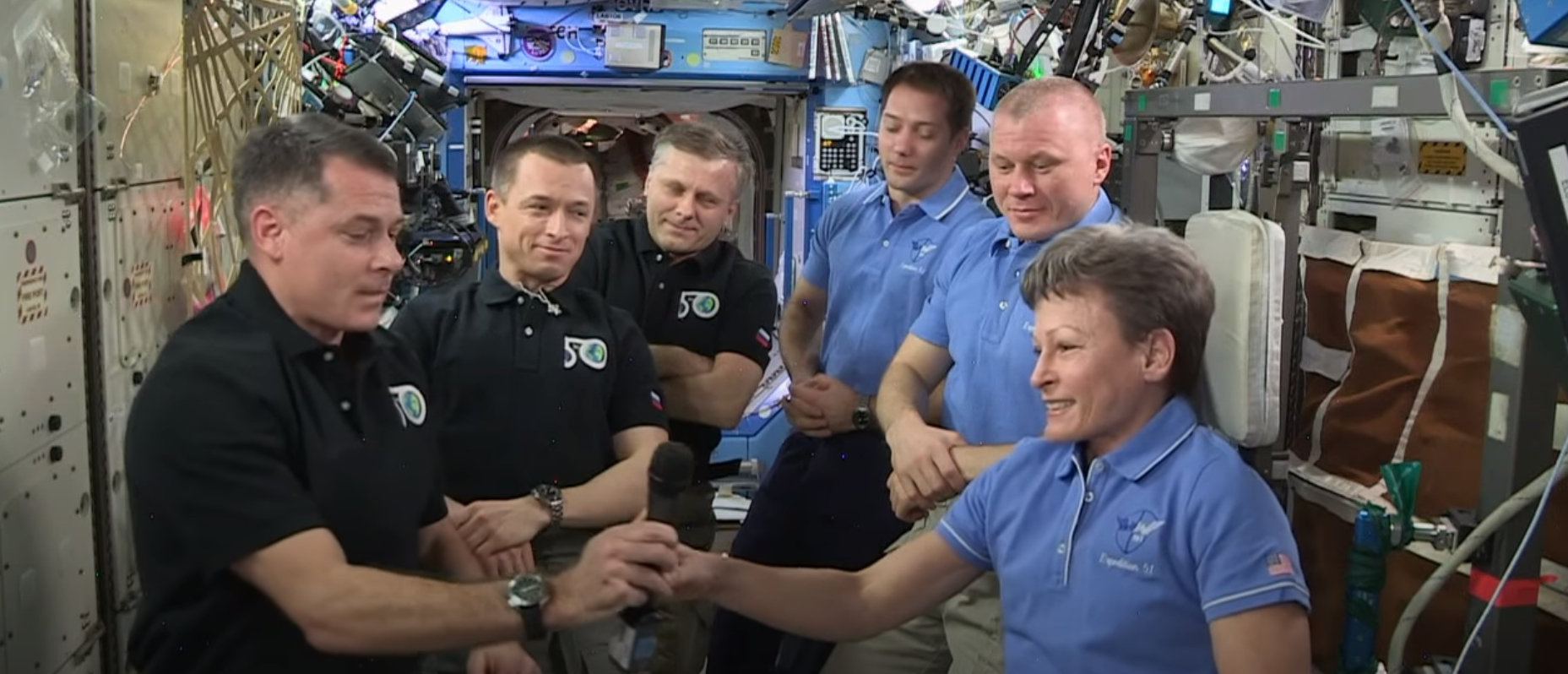
Astronaut Shane Kimbrough (far left) handed over station command to Peggy Whitson (far right). In between, from left to right are Sergey Ryzhikov and Andrey Borisenko of Expedition 50 in black and Thomas Pesquet and Oleg Novitiskiy of Expedition 51 in blue.

On April 9, 2017, Expedition 50, commanded by NASA astronaut Shane Kimbrough, handed over control of the station to Expedition 51 commanded by Whitson. Kimbrough, along with cosmonauts Sergey Ryzhikov and Andrey Borisenko of Roscosmos, undocked from the station at 7:57 UTC on April 10 in the Soyuz MS-02 spacecraft, they landed safely southeast of Dzhezkazgan, Kazakhstan. Once Expedition 50 departed, the crew started up their human research and maintenance on the U.S. spacesuits. Whitson explored how new lights installed in the station were affecting the crew health and wellness while Pesquet dumped cooling water and purged gas buildup from the water tanks inside the spacesuits in preparation for the May 12 spacewalk. Throughout the Expedition, the crew swapped between their roles as orbital scientists to maintenance technicians, from a morning of observing what happens to materials heated to extreme temperatures in zero-g to flushing water tanks in Progress M-66.

==== Research ====
The crew grew Chinese cabbage and Red Romaine lettuce in the Veggie facility. Veg-03 had a goal of further demonstrating the proof of concept for the Veggie plant growth chamber and planting pillows. Long duration missions in the Solar System require a fresh food supply to supplement the crew diets. Previous investigations focused on productivity, but the limited quarters of the ISS hampered large-scale crop production tests.

The crew installed and configured the JAXA Protein Crystal Growth #12 experiment in the JEM Ryutai rack. The two canisters contained 47 protein samples prepared by Russian and Japanese researchers to grow high quality proteins in a microgravity environment at constant temperature for 6 weeks in order to develop drugs for multi-drug-resistant bacteria, Alzheimer's disease, muscular dystrophy and periodontitis.

==== New arrivals: Soyuz MS-04 and Cygnus-7 ====
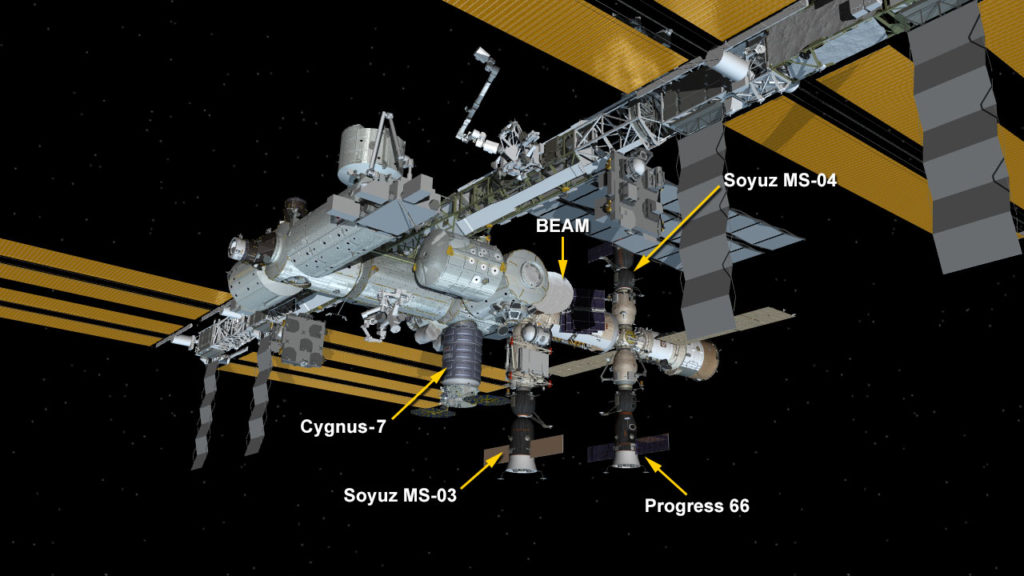
ISS Configuration - April 2017

The Soyuz MS-04 launched from the Baikonur Cosmodrome in Kazakhstan at 7:13 UTC on Thursday, April 20 with Fyodor Yurchikhin and Jack Fischer. They docked their Soyuz on the Poisk module at 13:18 UTC. The hatches opened at 15:25 UTC on April 20 to complete the full Expedition 51 complement to five: Whitson, Novitskiy, Pesquet, Yurchikhin and Fischer. On April 20, Pesquet and Whitson used the Space Station's robotic Canadarm2 to capture Orbital ATK's Cygnus-7 cargo spacecraft at 10:05 UTC. The Cygnus was docked to the Earth-facing port of the Unity module at 12:39 UTC, it had brought more than 7,600 pounds of research and supplies to support Expeditions 51 and 52.

==== Milestone ====
On April 24, 2017, Peggy Whitson broke the United States record for the most cumulative time spent in space, surpassing Jeff Williams record of 534 days. She received a congratulatory call from the President of the United States Donald Trump where she and Fischer discussed NASA's research in space and plans to go to Mars in the 2030s.

=== May 2017 - Research and EVAs ===
==== Research continued ====
One symptom of living in space for long periods is the pressure that builds up behind the eyes due to the upward flow of fluids resulting in astronauts reporting vision problems during and after their long-term missions. Expedition 51 regularly underwent ultrasound scans of their eyes and vision tests as part of a long running series of studies to help NASA plan missions further out in space. Another symptom of living in space is bone loss, Whitson and Pesquet setup samples for an OsteoOmics bone study to help research the molecular mechanisms the impact the bones of astronauts in space. Ficher, Yurchikhin and Novitskiy tested a unique suit that reversed the upward flow of fluids in a joint NASA-Roscosmos study called "Fluid Shifts". Another study, a winning proposal submitted during a student science competition, was tracking how space travel impacted astronaut's DNA and immune system. Pesquet completed the study for Genes in Space. Fischer strapped himself into a device for the NeuroMapping experiment on May 19 that tested how the human brain structure and function changes in space.

==== Cubesat deployment ====
On May 15, Japan's Kibo lab module ejected numerous types of Cubesats into space to study the earth's thermosphere properties and test experimental radar systems. Later in May, 17 cubesats were deployed over two days by NanoRacks, a private company with facilities on the Kibo Lab module.

==== 200th Station spacewalk - EVA 1 ====
Whitson and Fischer completed a four-hour space walk on May 12 to replace a large avionics box that supplied electricity and data connection to science experiments. They also installed a connector that routed data to the Alpha Magnetic Spectrometer, they repaired insulation at a connection point for the Japanese Robotic Arm and installed a protective shield on the Pressurized Mating Adapter-3. At the 200th spacewalk mark, astronauts had completed a total of 1,247 hours and 55 minutes working outside of the station.

==== Computer relay box replacement - EVA 2 ====
One of two fully redundant multiplexer-demultiplexer (MDM) data relay boxes on the S0 truss failed on May 21 at 18:28 UTC. The crew was informed of the failure, but were not in any danger from it. On May 23, Whitson and Fischer completed a 2-hour and 46 minute spacewalk where they replaced the MDM-1 computer relay box and installed a pair of antennas to enhance wireless communication for future spacewalks.

=== June 2017 - Handover to Expedition 52 ===
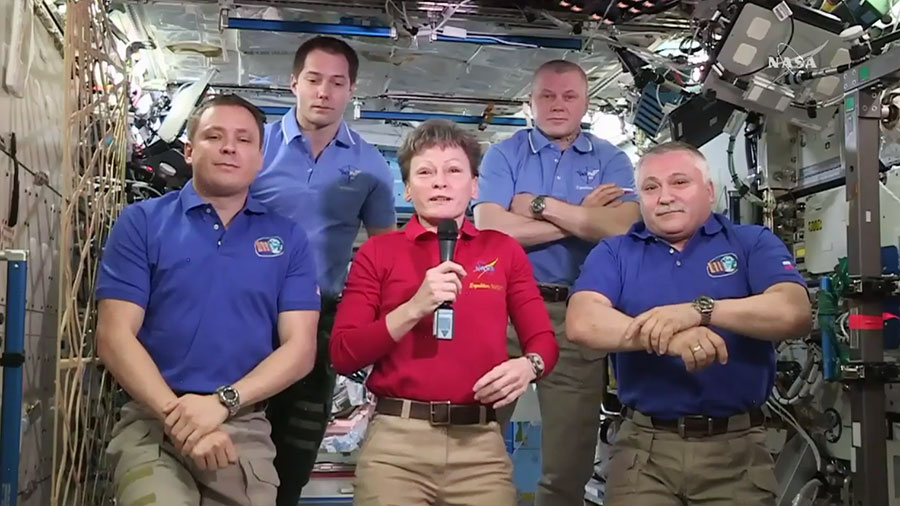
Whitson (in red), transferred command to Yurchikhin (front row, right). Fischer (left). Behind (from left): Pesquet & Novitskiy.

On June 1, Expedition 51, commanded by Whitson, handed over command of the International Space Station to Russian cosmonaut Fyodor Yurchikhin in the traditional Change of Command ceremony. Expedition 52 officially began with the departure of Soyuz MS-03 on June 2, 2017, with Oleg Novitskiy of Roscosomos and Thomas Pesquet of ESA aboard.

== Spacewalks ==
EVA #	Spacewalkers	Start (UTC)	End (UTC)	Duration
Expedition 51; EVA 1	Peggy Whitson; Jack D. Fischer	May 12, 2017; 13:08	May 12, 2017; 17:21	4 hours 13 minutes
Expedition 51; EVA 1	Replaced ExPRESS Carrier Avionics (ExPCA), Installed Pressurized Mating Adapter-3 (PMA-3) Forward Shield, Installed Alpha Magnetic Spectrometer (AMS) MIL-1553 Terminator, Secured Multilayer Insulation (MLI) on Japanese Manipulator System, Relocated a Portable Foot Restrain to PMA-3			
EVA 2	Peggy Whitson; Jack D. Fischer	May 23, 2017; 12:20	May 23, 2017; 15:06	2 hours 46 minutes
EVA 2	Replace failed Multiplexer-Demultiplexer (MDM), Installed two Wireless Communication Anntenna's			

== Uncrewed spaceflights to the ISS ==
Resupply missions that visited the International Space Station during Expedition 51:

Spacecraft: ISS flight number	Country	Mission	Launcher	Launch (UTC)	Docked/Berthed (UTC) ^{†}	Undocked/Unberthed (UTC)	Duration (Docked)	Deorbit
Cygnus CRS OA-7: CRS OA-7	United States	Logistics	Atlas V 401	18 Apr 2017, 15:11:26	22 Apr 2017, 10:16	4 Jun 2017, 11:05	43d 49m	11 Jun 2017, 17:08
