= Expedition 50 =

50th expedition to the International Space Station

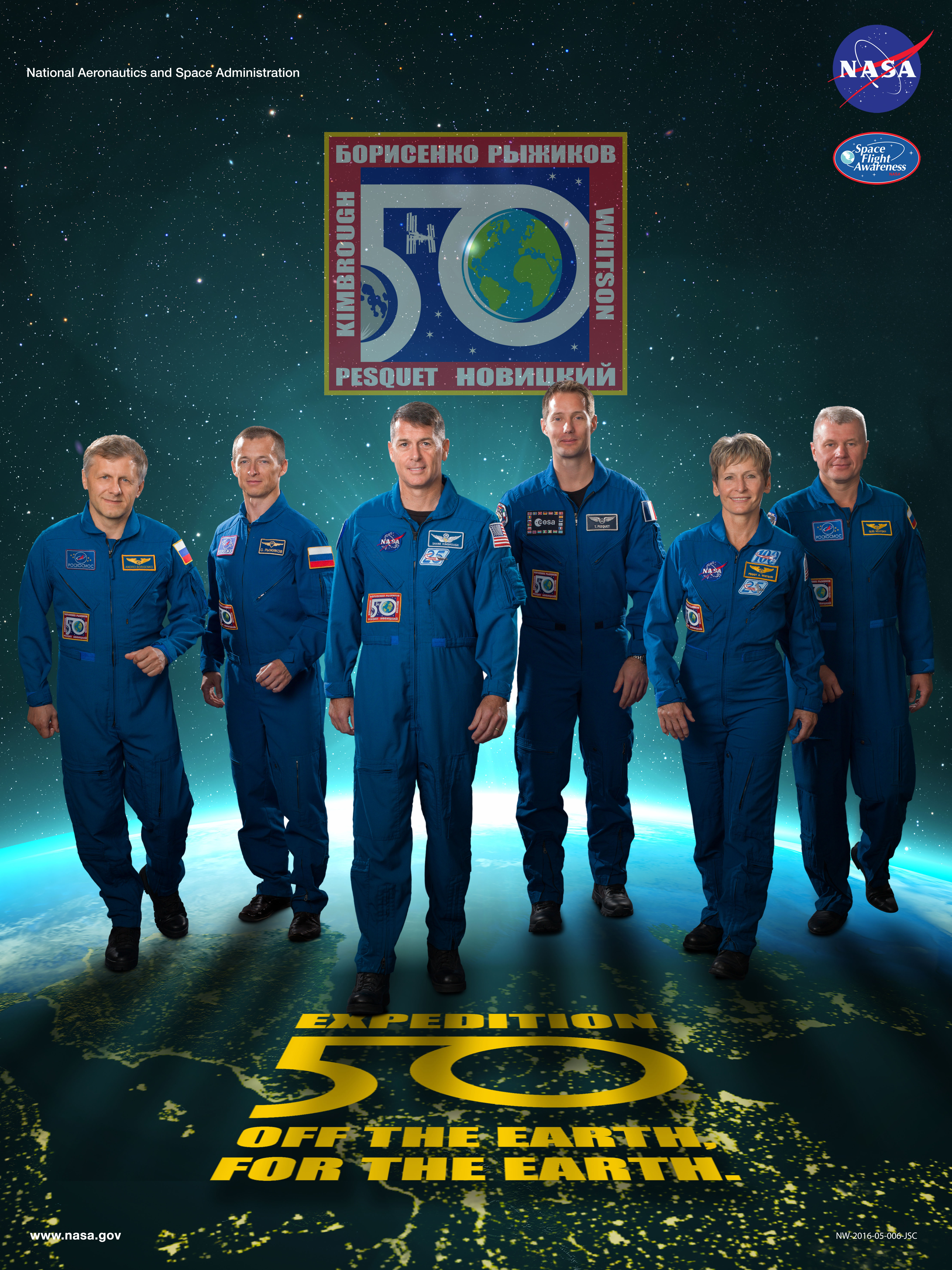
- Promotional Poster
- Mission type: Long-duration expedition

Expedition
- Space station: International Space Station
- Began: 30 October 2016 UTC
- Ended: 10 April 2017 UTC
- Arrived aboard: Soyuz MS-02; Soyuz MS-03
- Departed aboard: Soyuz MS-02; Soyuz MS-03; Soyuz MS-04

Crew
- Crew size: 6
- Members: Expedition 49/50: Shane Kimbrough; Andrey Borisenko; Sergey Ryzhikov; Expedition 50/51: Oleg Novitsky; Thomas Pesquet; Expedition 50/51/52: Peggy Whitson
- EVAs: 4
- EVA duration: 26 hours 8 min
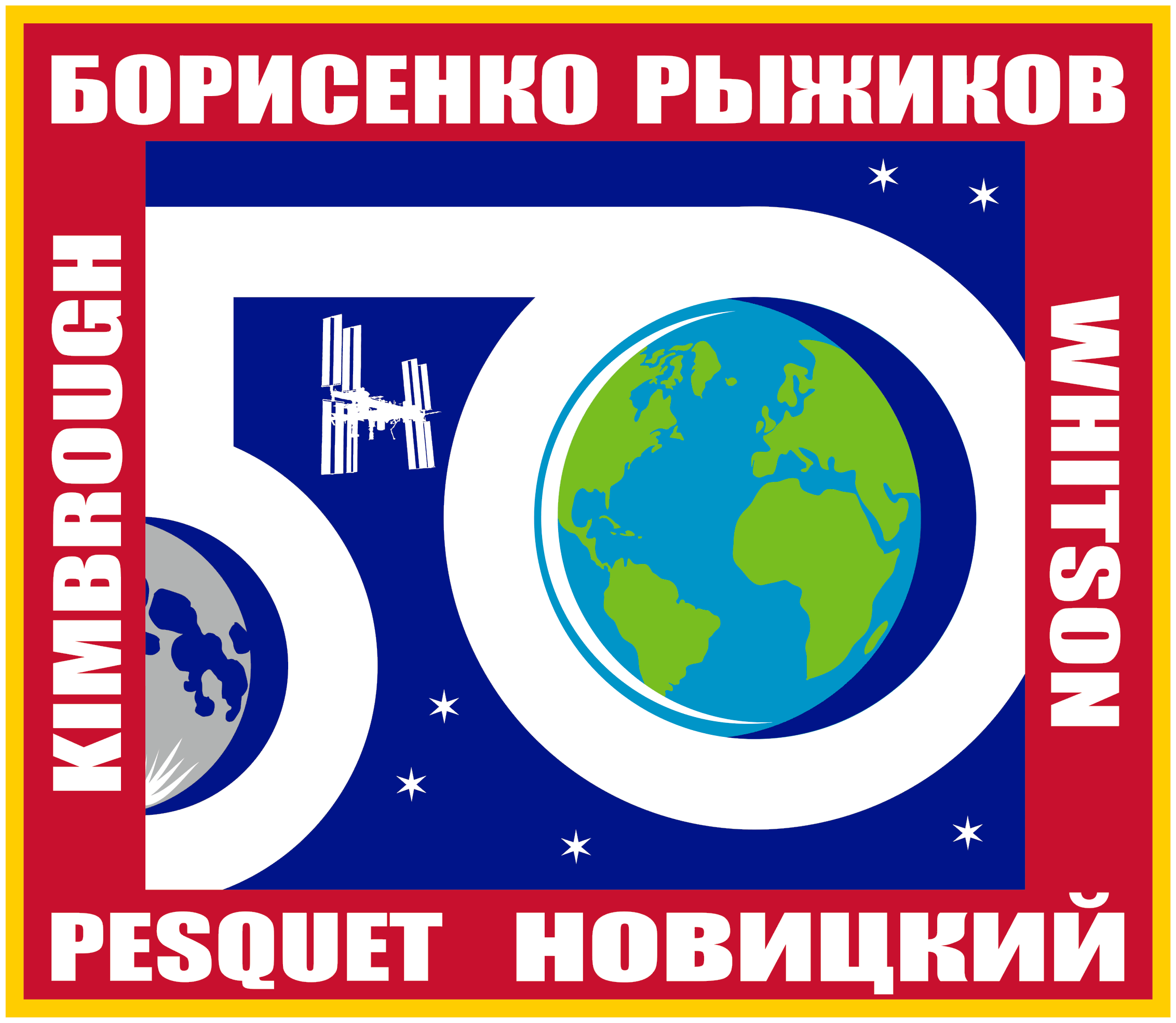
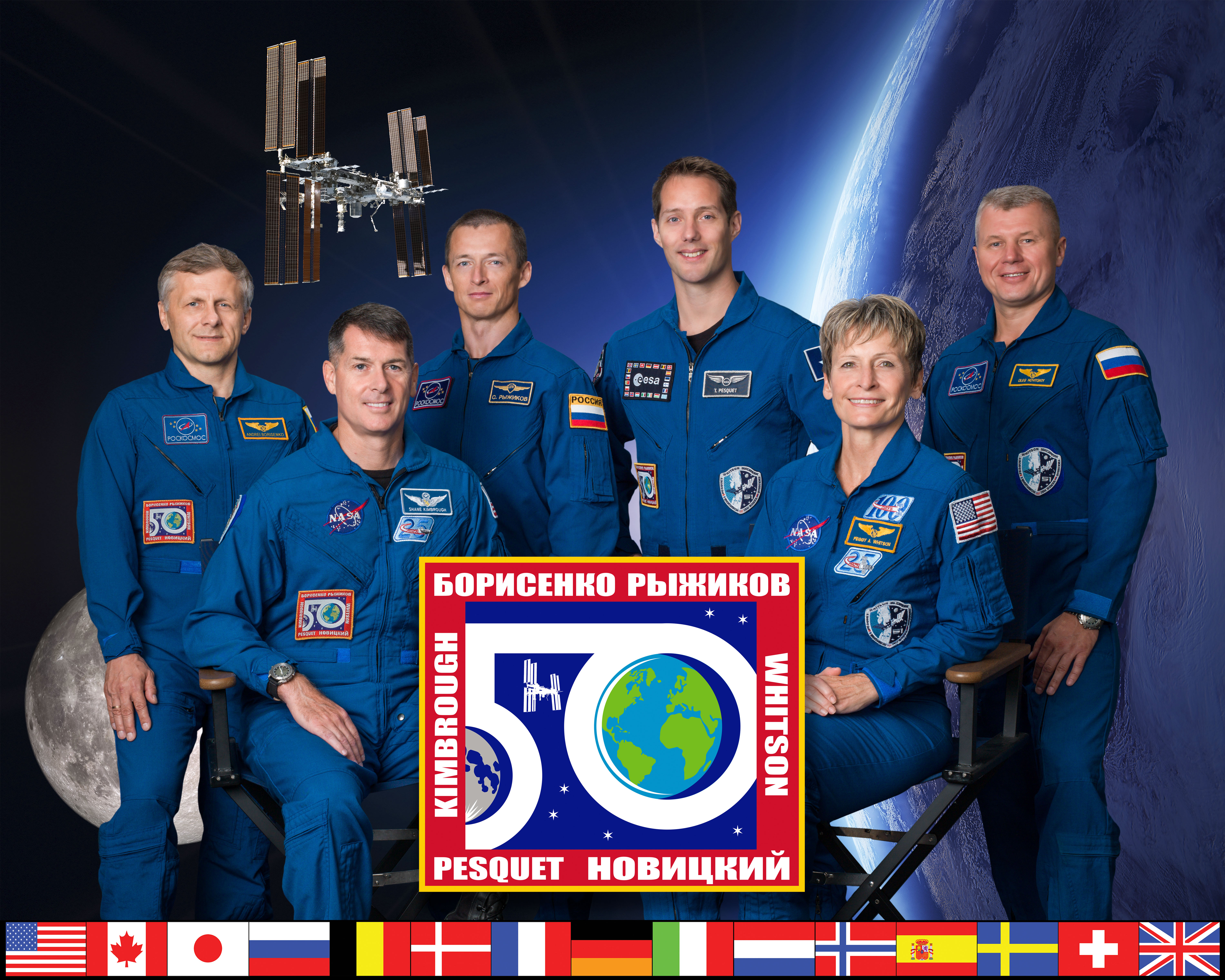
- Expedition 50 mission patch (l-r) Borisenko, Kimbrough, Ryzhikov, Pesquet, Whitson, Novitsky ISS expeditions

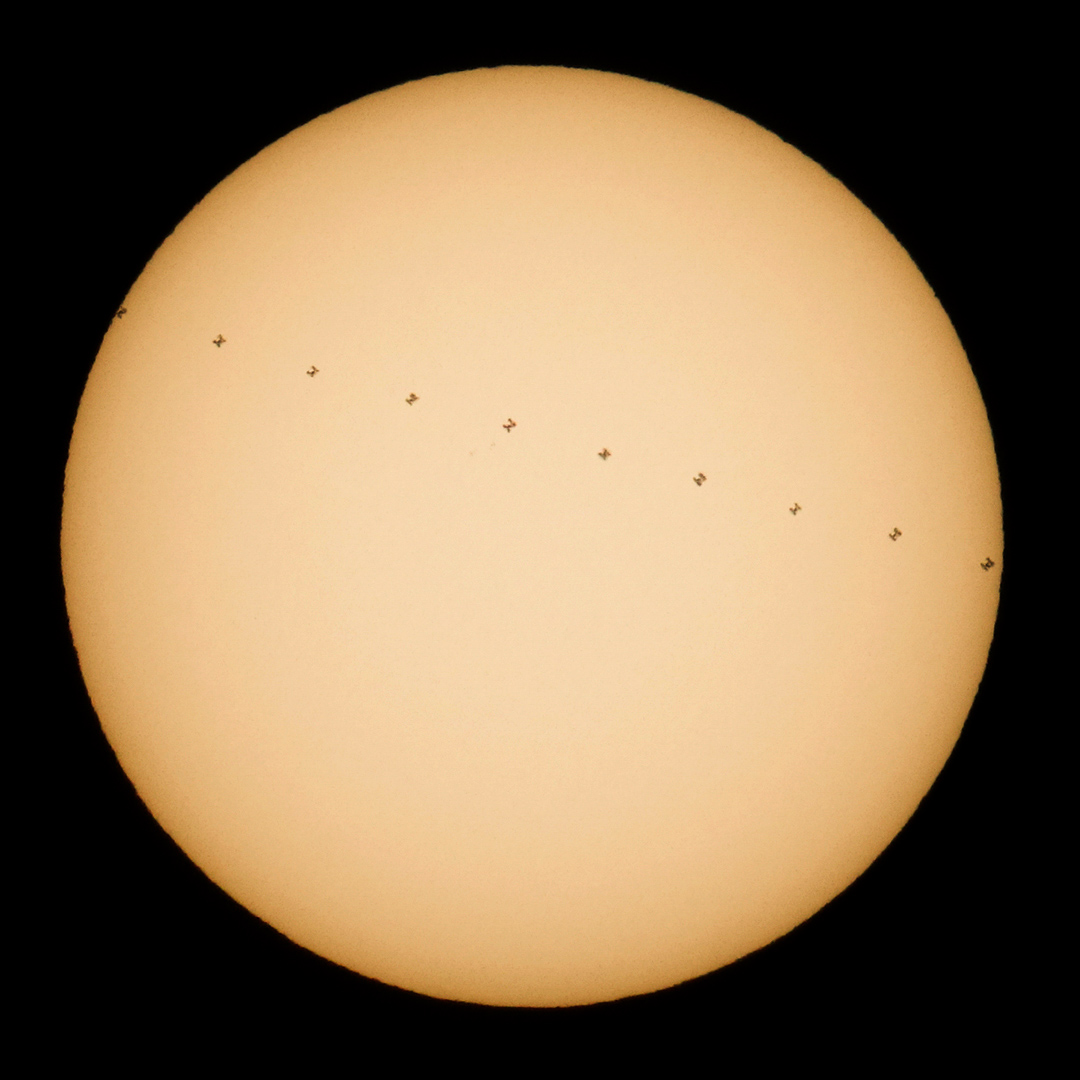
The ISS as seen from California transiting the Sun on December 17, 2016

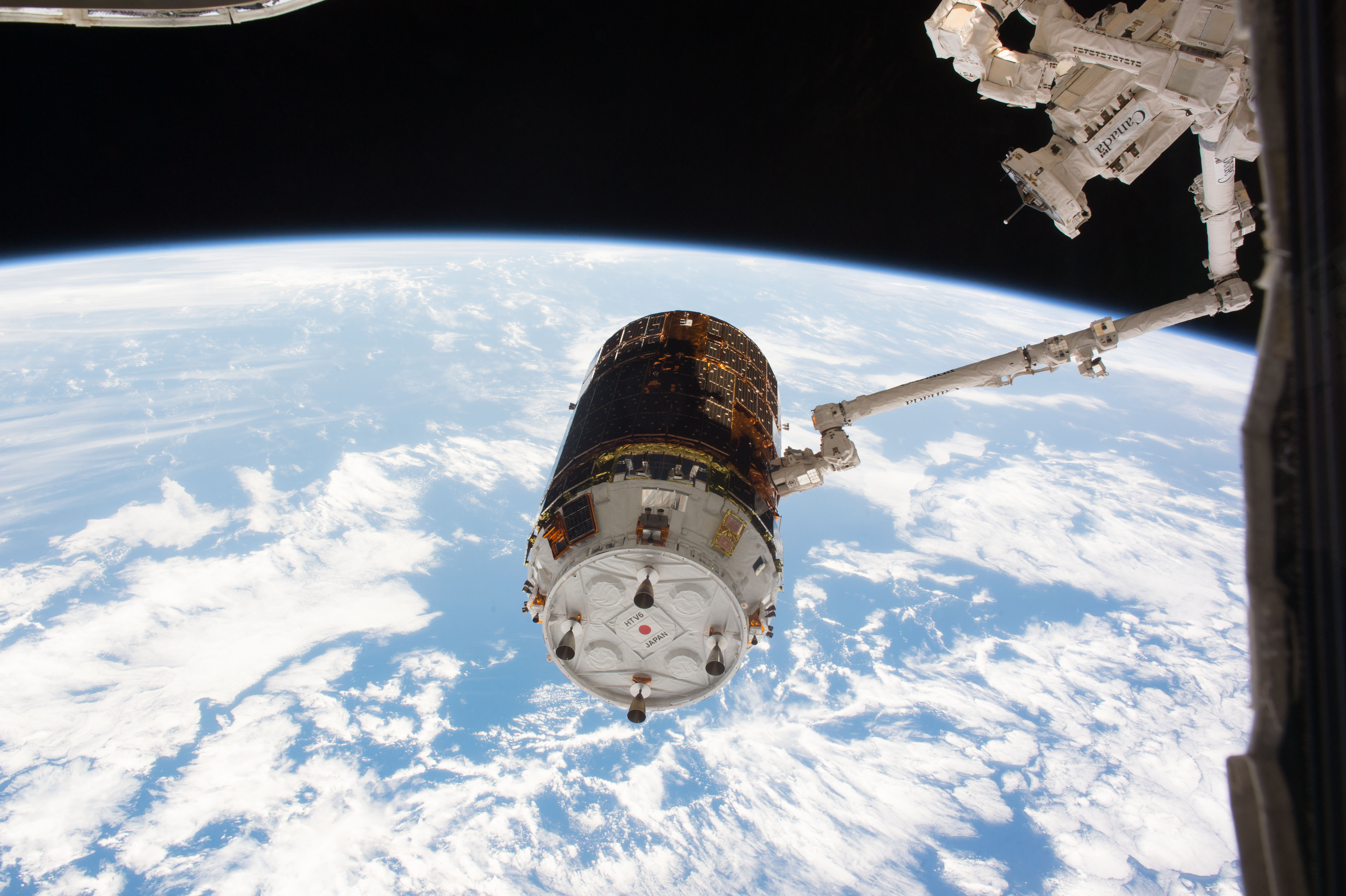
HTV-6 grappled by the ISS robotic arm December 13, 2016

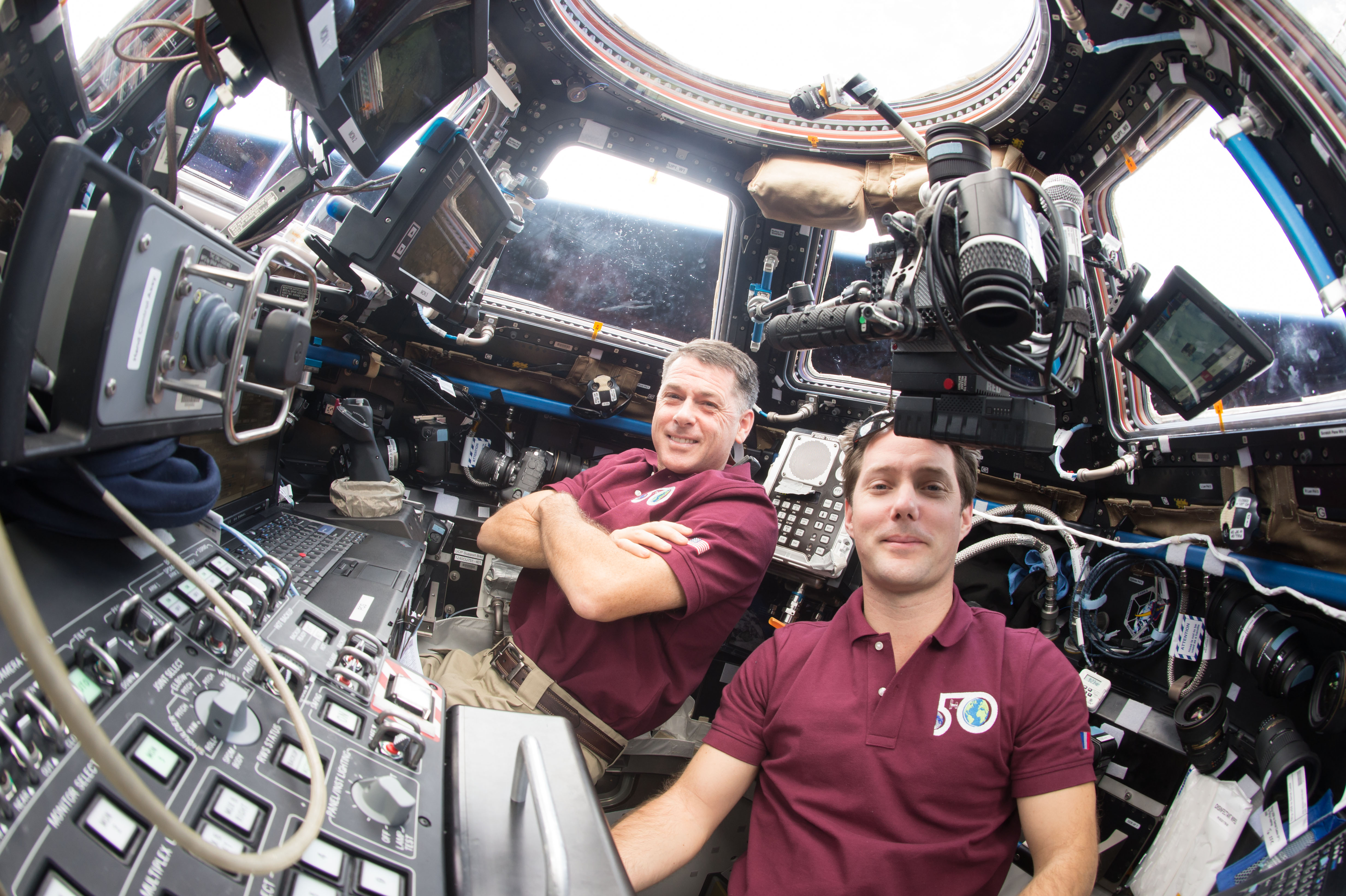
Expedition 50 crewmembers Kimbrough (left) and Pesquet (right) in the ISS Cupola, December 2016

Expedition 50 was the 50th expedition to the International Space Station. Shane Kimbrough, Andrey Borisenko and Sergey Ryzhikov transferred from Expedition 49. Expedition 50 began upon the departure of Soyuz MS-01 on October 28, 2016 and was concluded upon the departure of Soyuz MS-02 on April 10, 2017. The crew of Soyuz MS-03 were transferred to Expedition 51.

After the launch of Soyuz MS-03, Peggy Whitson, at age 56, became the oldest woman to fly into space. By taking command of Expedition 51 on April 10, 2017, she also became the first woman to command two ISS expeditions (after Expedition 16 in 2007–2008). Soyuz MS-03 docked at the International Space Station on November 19, 2016, bringing the total number of people in the station to 6.

== Crew ==
Position	First Part (October to November 2016)	Second Part (November 2016 to April 2017)
Commander	Shane Kimbrough, NASA; Second spaceflight	
Flight engineer	Sergey Ryzhikov, RSA; First spaceflight	
Flight engineer	Andrey Borisenko, RSA; Second and last spaceflight	
Flight engineer		Peggy Whitson, NASA; Third (last NASA) spaceflight
Flight engineer		Oleg Novitsky, RSA; Second spaceflight
Flight engineer		Thomas Pesquet, ESA; First spaceflight

== Mission overview ==
=== Expedition 49/50 launch and docking ===
Soyuz MS-02 launched on October 19, 2016, transporting Robert S. Kimbrough, Andrei Borisenko and Sergey Ryzhikov, who would make up the Expedition 49/50 crew. MS-02 docked with the (Poisk (MRM-2) module on October 21, 2016.

=== Expedition 50/51 launch and docking ===
Soyuz MS-03 launched on November 17, 2016, transporting Oleg Novitskiy, Peggy Whitson and Thomas Pesquet. MS-03 docked with the Rassvet module on November 19, 2016.

=== Activities ===
On 25 December 2016, the crew celebrated Christmas by floating in micro-gravity and opening Christmas presents recently delivered on a Japanese cargo spacecraft. One astronaut wore a Santa hat in orbit. The French astronaut Pesquet shared special French food with the station crew. Pesquet also made a Christmas-time special video for the ESA.

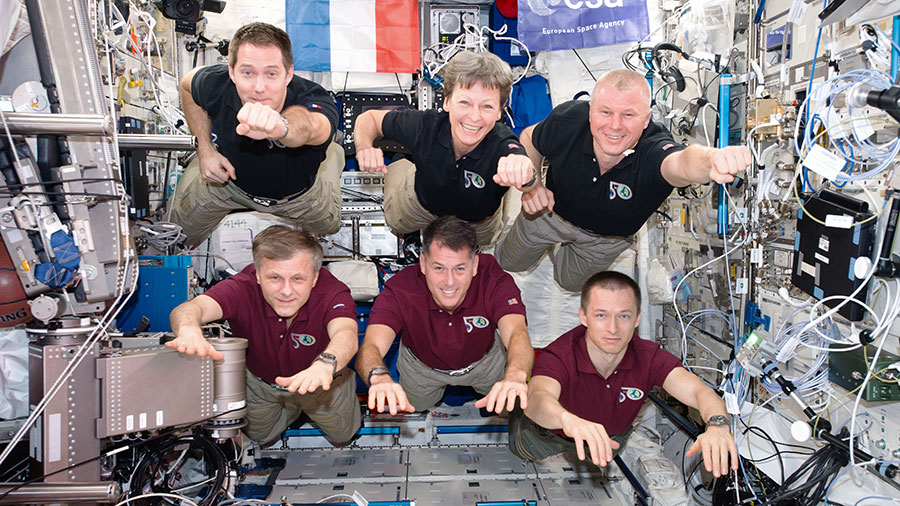
The six-person Expedition 50 crew poses for a group portrait inside the Columbus lab module. (Top row from left) Thomas Pesquet, Peggy Whitson and Oleg Novitskiy. (Bottom row from left) Andrey Borisenko, Kimbrough and Sergey Ryzhikov.

== Uncrewed spaceflights to the ISS ==
A number of resupply missions visited the International Space Station during Expedition 50.

Spacecraft: ISS flight number	Country	Mission	Launcher	Launch (UTC)	Docked/Berthed (UTC) ^{†}	Undocked/Unberthed (UTC)	Duration (Docked)	Deorbit
Cygnus CRS OA-5: CRS OA-5	United States	Logistics	Antares 230	17 Oct 2016, 23:45:40	23 Oct 2016, 11:28	21 Nov 2016, 12:35	29d 1h 7m	27 Nov 2016, 23:36
Progress MS-04: ISS-65P	Russia	Logistics	Soyuz-U	1 Dec 2016, 14:51:45	Spacecraft separated from third stage before reaching orbit; loss of mission			
Kounotori 6: HTV-6	Japan	Logistics	H-IIB	9 Dec 2016, 13:26:47	13 Dec 2016, 10:37	27 Jan 2017 15:45	45d 5h 8m	5 February 2017, 15:06
SpaceX CRS-10: CRS SpX-10	United States	Logistics	Falcon 9	19 February 2017, 14:39:00	23 February 2017, 13:12	19 March 2017, 09:11	23d 19h 54m	19 March 2017, 14:00
Progress MS-05: ISS-66P	Russia	Logistics	Soyuz-U	22 February 2017 05:58:33	24 February 2017, 08:34	20 Jul 2017, 17:46	146d 9h 16m	20 Jul 2017, 20:58

== Spacewalks ==
EVA #	Spacewalkers	Start (UTC)	End (UTC)	Duration
EVA 1	Peggy Whitson; Shane Kimbrough	January 6, 2017; 11:23	January 6, 2017; 17:55	6 hours 32 minutes
EVA 1	Installed adapter plates and cables for new batteries on 3A power channel, pictures of AMS, removal of camera and routing of Ethernet cable.			
EVA 2	Shane Kimbrough (France) Thomas Pesquet	January 13, 2017; 11:22	January 13, 2017; 17:20	5 hours 58 minutes
EVA 2	Primary objectives: Retrieve Adapter Plate E and F from the Express Pallet (EP), Install Adapter Plate F in Slot 6, Relocate Battery 4 to Adapter Plate F, Install Adapter Plate E in Slot 4, Retrieve and Install Adapter Plate D in Slot 2, Fasten H1 Bolts on Li-Ion Batteries in Slots 1 and 5. Get-ahead tasks:Node 3 Shields Bundle #3 Temp Stow, Mobile Transporter Relay Assembly (MTRA) Camera Light Pan and Tilt Assembly (CLPA) Swap, Latching End Effector (LEE) A Worksite Interface Fixture (WIF) Adapter R&R, S0 aft to Z1 forward (Rat's Nest) Photo Mapping, Secure Solar Array Blanket Boxes (SABB) Restraints, Relocate Shields Bundle #2 to Node 3.			
EVA 3	Shane Kimbrough (France) Thomas Pesquet	March 24, 2017; 11:24	March 24, 2017; 17:58	6 hours 34 minutes
EVA 3	Prepare PMA for move, EXT-2 MDM removal & replace with new EPIC MDM, Camera Work, Lubricated Canadarm2 end effector and inspected a radiator value.			
EVA 4	Shane Kimbrough; Peggy Whitson	March 30, 2017; 12:29	March 30, 2017; 19:33	7 hours 4 minutes
EVA 4	EXT-1 MDM removal & replace with new EPIC MDM, Node 3 axial shields install including replacing a lost shield with the PMA-3 cover, PMA-3 cummerbunds install, PMA-3 cover removal, PMA-3 connections, close Node 3 port CDC, Inspection & cleaning of the Earth-facing berthing port of the Harmony module.			

== See also ==
- Christmas on the International Space Station
