= Soyuz MS-03 =

2016 Russian crewed spaceflight to the ISS

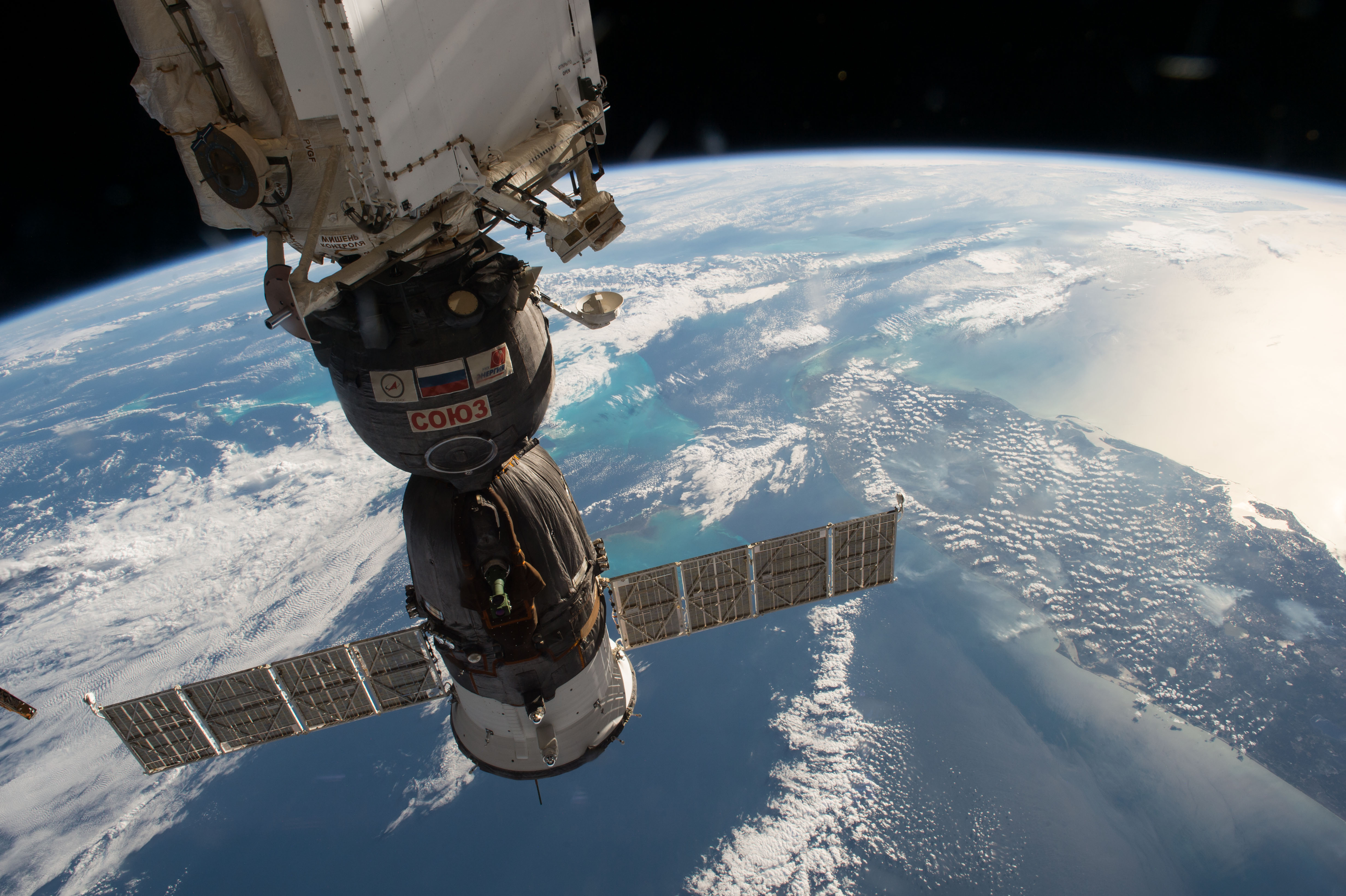
- Soyuz MS-03 docked to International Space Station (ISS).
- Mission type: ISS crew transport
- Operator: Roscosmos
- COSPAR ID: 2016-070A
- SATCAT no.: 41864
- Mission duration: 196 days 17 hours 49 minutes

Spacecraft properties
- Spacecraft: Soyuz MS
- Spacecraft type: Soyuz MS 11F732A48
- Manufacturer: Energia
- Launch mass: 7080 kg

Crew
- Crew size: 3 (launching); 2 (landing)
- Members: Oleg Novitsky; Thomas Pesquet
- Launching: Peggy Whitson
- Callsign: Kazbek

Start of mission
- Launch date: 17 November 2016, 20:17:00 UTC
- Rocket: Soyuz-FG
- Launch site: Baikonur, Site 1
- Contractor: RKTs Progress

End of mission
- Landing date: 2 June 2017, 14:10 UTC
- Landing site: Steppes of the Kazakhstan

Orbital parameters
- Reference system: Geocentric orbit
- Regime: Low Earth orbit
- Inclination: 51.66°

Docking with ISS
- Docking port: Rassvet nadir
- Docking date: 19 November 2016, 21:58 UTC
- Undocking date: 2 June 2017, 10:47 UTC
- Time docked: 194 days
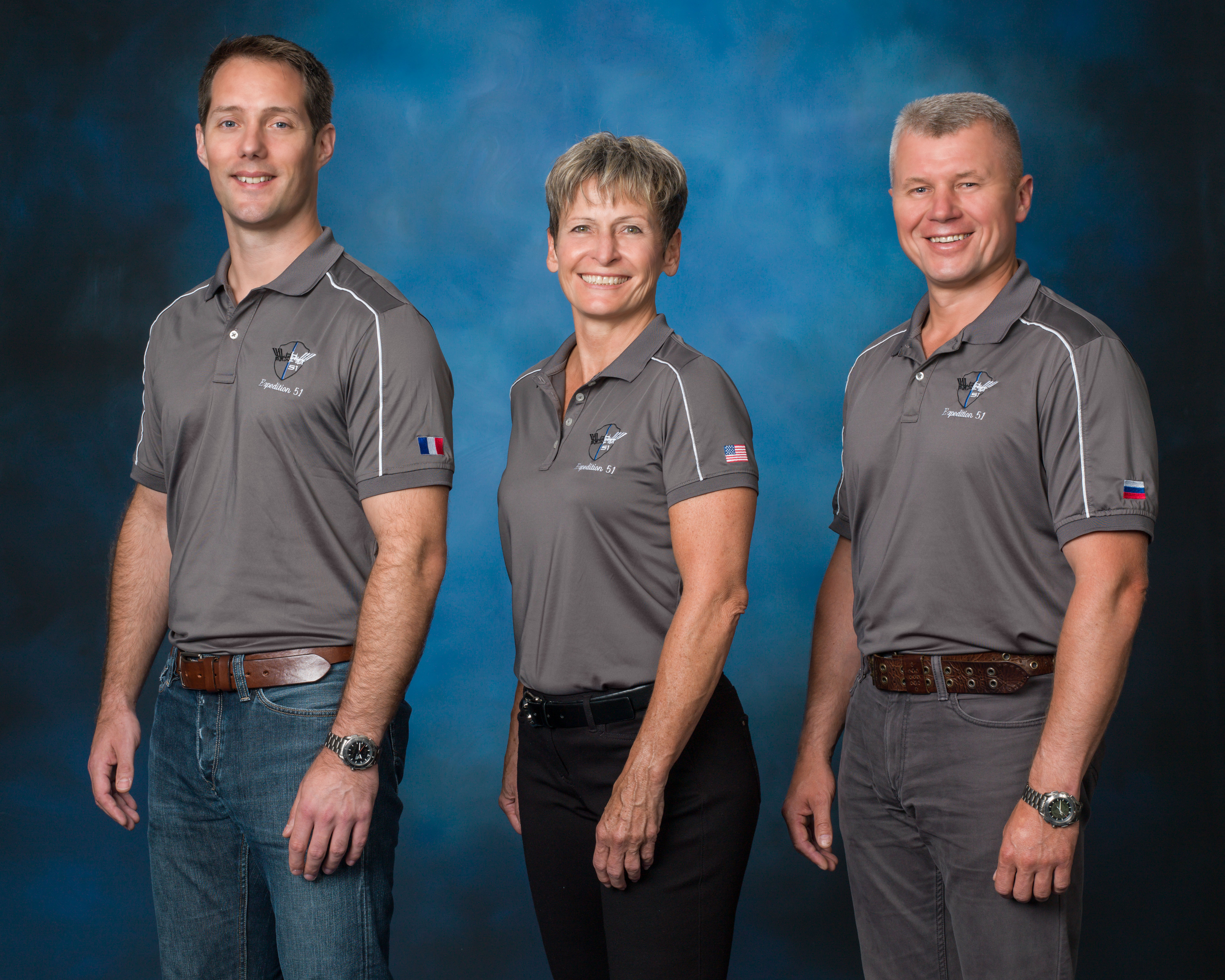
- Mission insignia (l-r) Pesquet, Whitson and Novitsky Soyuz programme (crewed)

Soyuz MS-03 was a Soyuz spaceflight launched on 17 November 2016. It transported three members of the Expedition 50 crew to the International Space Station. MS-03 was the 132nd flight of a Soyuz spacecraft. The crew consisted of a Russian commander with American and French flight engineers. The European segment of the mission was called "Proxima".

== Crew ==
Prime crew
Position	Launching crew	Landing crew
Commander	(Russia) Oleg Novitsky, Roscosmos; Expedition 50; Second spaceflight	
Flight engineer	(France) Thomas Pesquet, ESA; Expedition 50; First spaceflight	
Flight engineer	(United States) Peggy Whitson, NASA; Expedition 50/51/52; Third (last NASA) spaceflight	None

Backup crew
Position	Crew
Commander	(Russia) Fyodor Yurchikhin, Roscosmos
Flight engineer	(United States) Jack D. Fischer, NASA
Flight engineer	(Italy) Paolo Nespoli, ESA

== Mission highlights ==
Soyuz MS-03 launched with Expedition 50/51 on 17 November 2016, at 20:17 UTC. Astronaut Peggy Whitson, at age 56, became the oldest woman to fly into space. Soyuz MS-03 docked at the International Space Station on 19 November 2016. On 2 June 2017, Soyuz MS-03 undocked from the ISS, carrying Oleg Novitsky and Thomas Pesquet back to Earth after 196 days in space. Whitson remained on the ISS and returned on Soyuz MS-04 on 3 September 2017.
