= Shane Kimbrough =

American astronaut (born 1967)

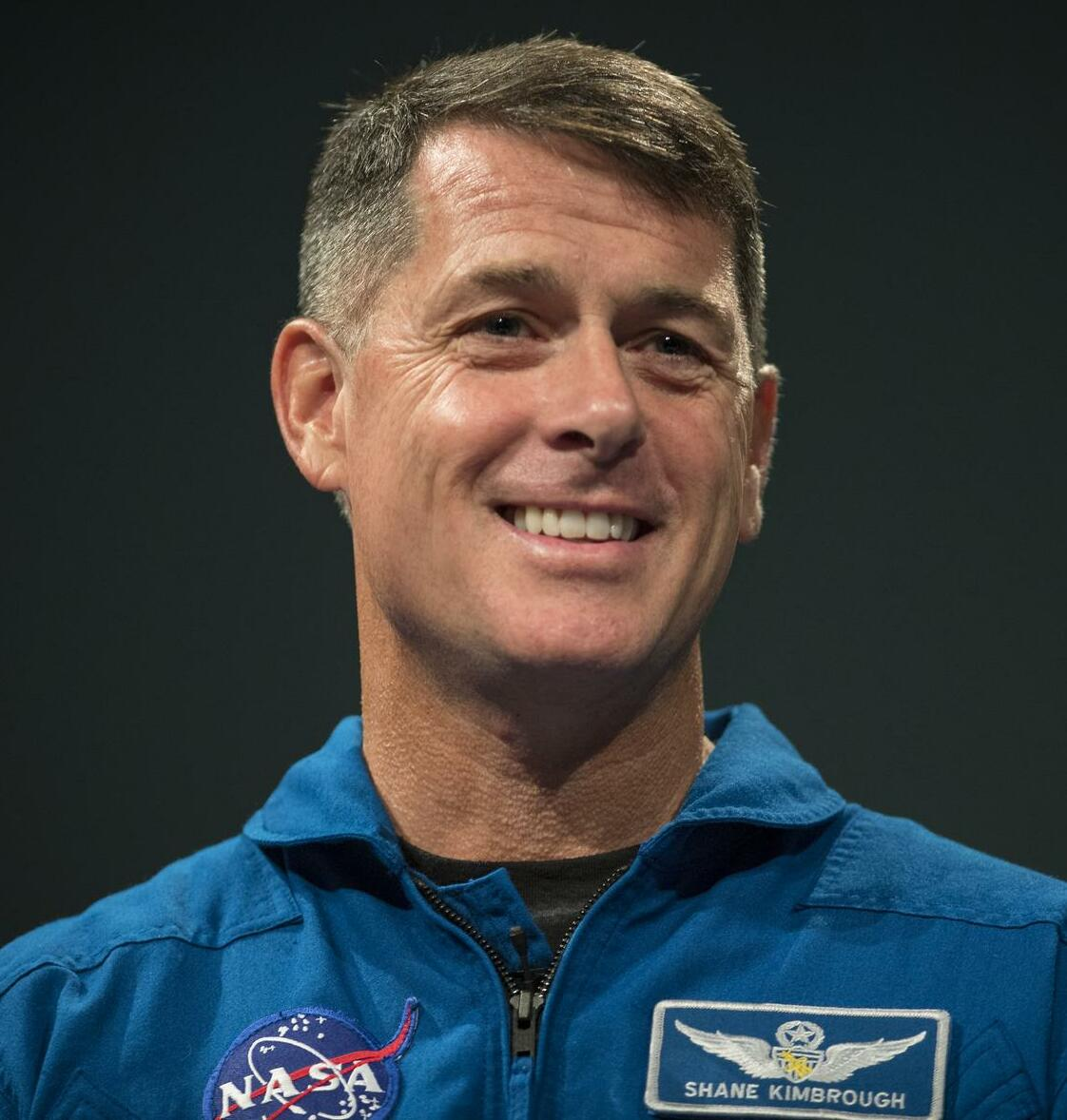
- Kimbrough at the Smithsonian National Air and Space Museum in September 2017
- Born: Robert Shane Kimbrough; June 4, 1967 (age 59); Killeen, Texas, U.S.
- Education: United States Military Academy (BS); Georgia Institute of Technology (MS)
- Space career

NASA astronaut
- Rank: Colonel, USA (ret.)
- Time in space: 388d 17h 28m
- Selection: NASA Group 19 (2004)
- Total EVAs: 9
- Total EVA time: 59h 28m
- Mission: STS-126; Soyuz MS-02 (Expedition 49/50); SpaceX Crew-2 (Expedition 65/66)
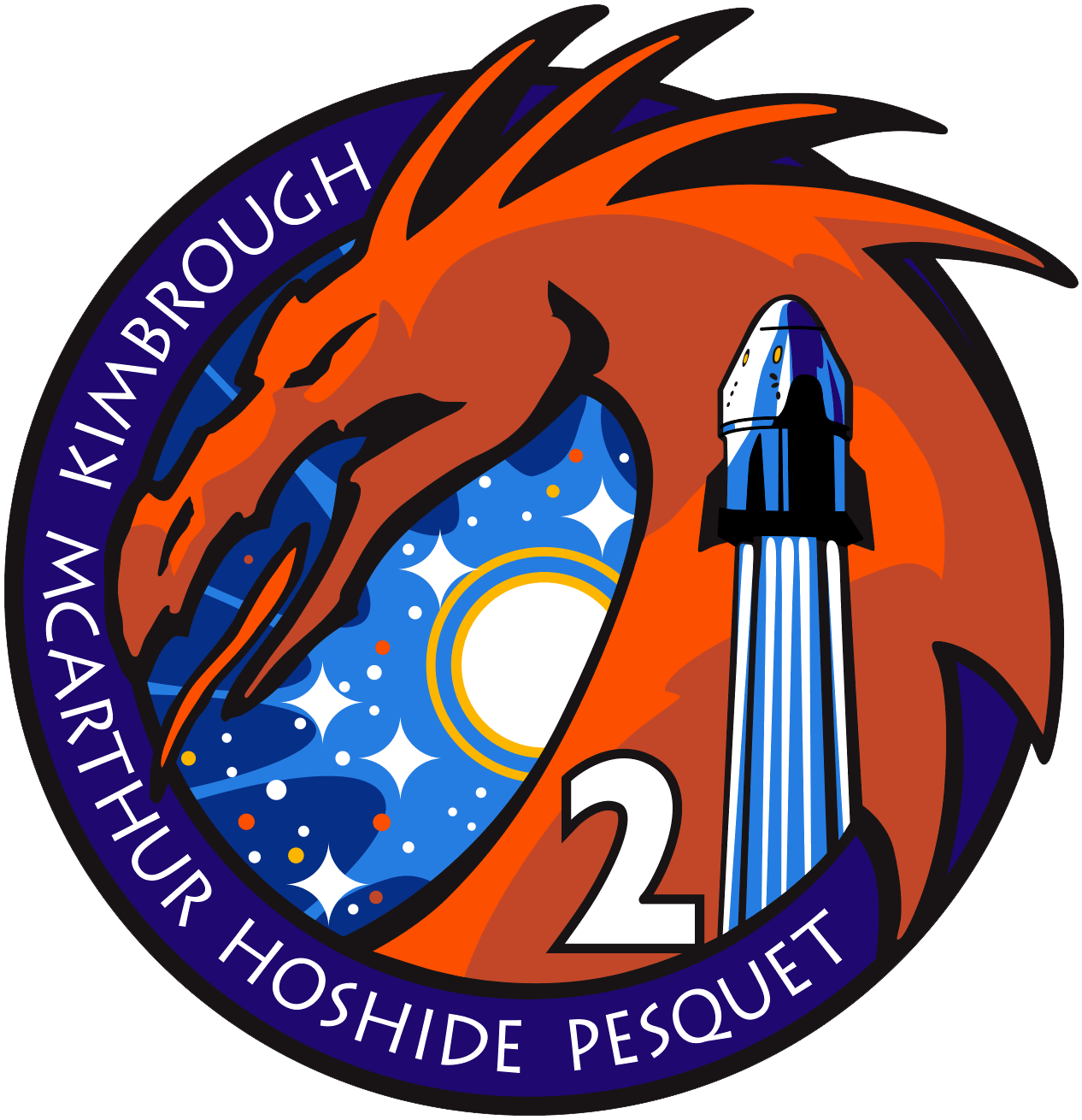
- Mission insignia
- Retired: July 31, 2022

Robert Shane Kimbrough (born June 4, 1967) is a retired United States Army officer and former NASA astronaut. He was part of the first group of candidates selected for NASA astronaut training following the Space Shuttle Columbia disaster. Kimbrough is a veteran of three spaceflights, the first being a Space Shuttle flight, and the second being a six-month mission to the ISS on board a Russian Soyuz craft. He was the commander of the International Space Station for Expedition 50, and returned to Earth in April 2017. He is married to the former Robbie Lynn Nickels.

== Early life ==
Born June 4, 1967, in Killeen, Texas, Kimbrough graduated from The Lovett School in Atlanta, Georgia in 1985. Kimbrough graduated from the United States Military Academy in 1989 with a Bachelor of Science degree in aerospace engineering. He played for the West Point baseball team for four years, and was selected as team captain his senior year.

== Military career ==
Kimbrough served as an Apache helicopter pilot in the first Gulf War, Operation Desert Storm in 1991. Kimbrough later attended and graduated from Georgia Tech with a M.S. in operations research in 1998. In 2000, he joined NASA and was assigned as a Flight Simulation Engineer on the Shuttle Training Aircraft where he helped NASA train astronauts on landing procedures for several years before he himself was selected for training in 2004.

He retired from the U.S. Army with the rank of colonel.

== NASA career ==
=== STS-126 ===
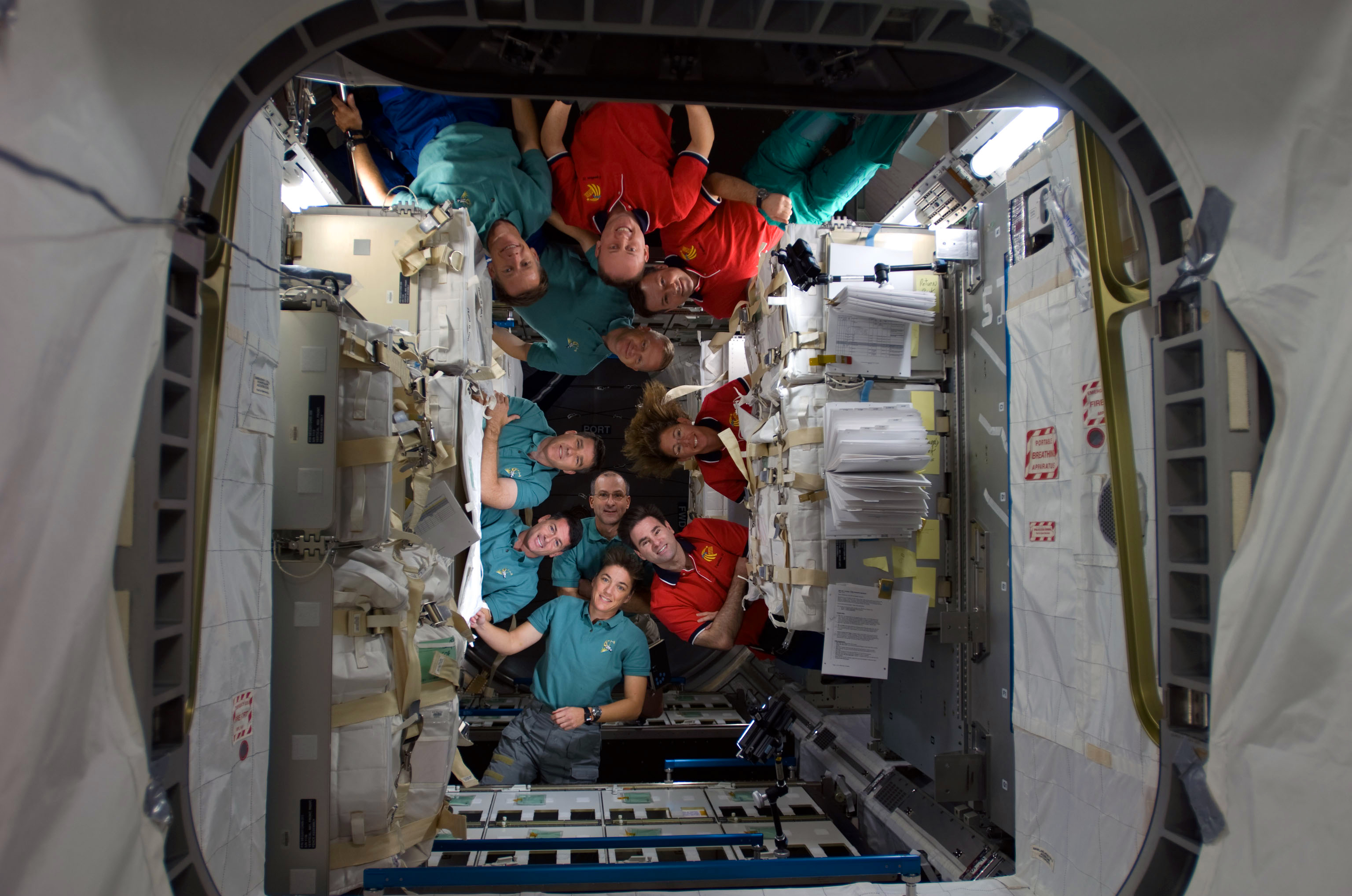
STS-126 and Expedition 18 group photo

Kimbrough was a mission specialist on STS-126, which launched on November 14, 2008. During the mission, Kimbrough performed two EVAs. On the tenth anniversary of the International Space Station, Stefanyshyn-Piper and Kimbrough successfully conducted the mission's second EVA, and Kimbrough's first, which lasted 6 hours, 45 minutes. Kimbrough's second EVA was performed on November 24, 2008, and lasted 6 hours and 7 minutes. At the completion of the mission, Kimbrough's cumulative spacewalk time, was 12 hours, 52 minutes.

=== Expedition 49/50 ===
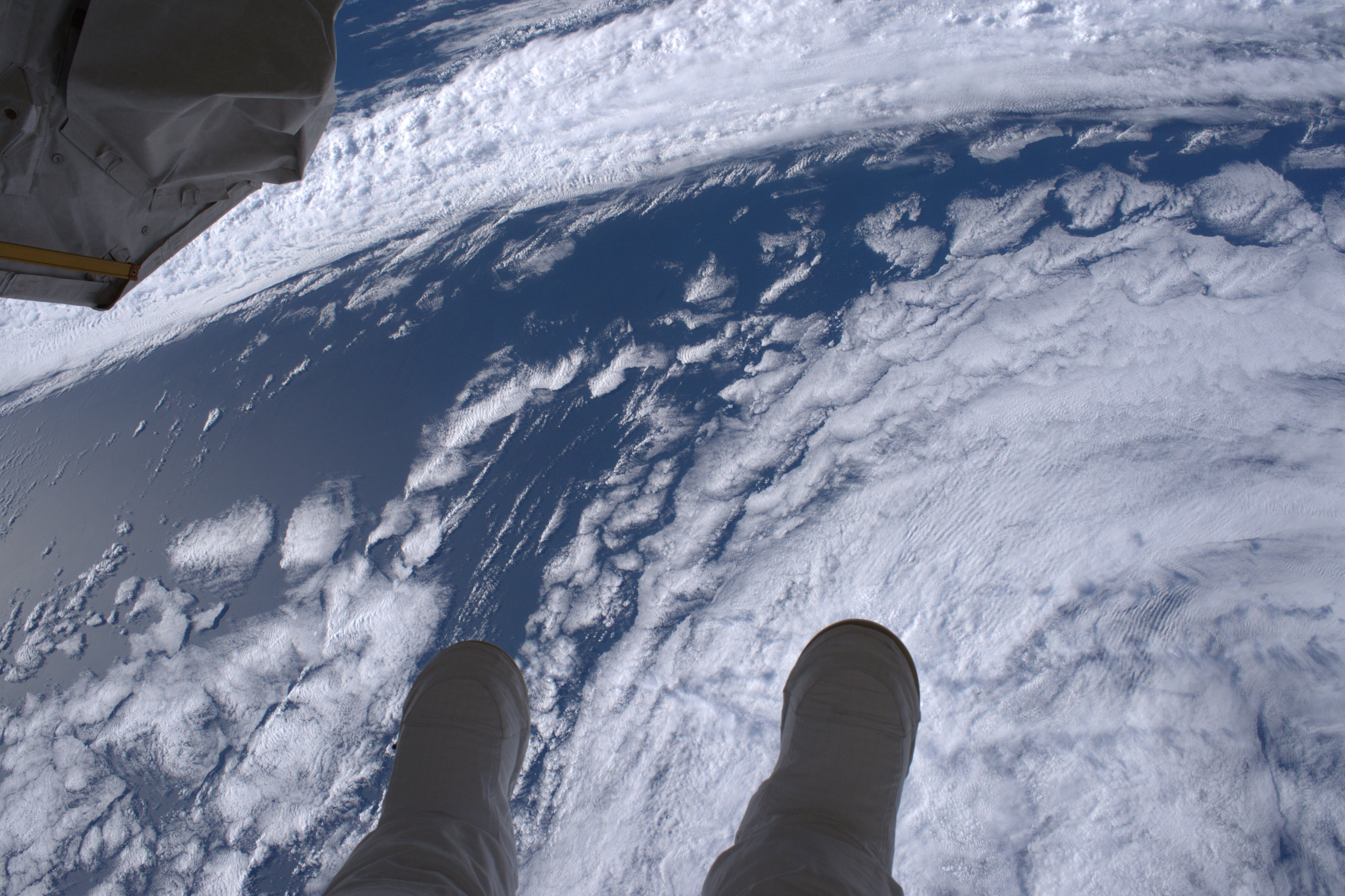
Shane Kimbrough during EVA on March 24, 2017

Kimbrough launched onboard Soyuz MS-02 to the International Space Station on October 19, 2016, as part of a four-month mission for Expedition 49 /50. Kimbrough became commander of Expedition 50 upon the departure of Soyuz MS-01 on October 28.

On January 6, 2017, Kimbrough performed his third EVA, along with Peggy Whitson. During the EVA, they installed three new adapter plates and hooked up electrical connectors preparing the way to replace the ISS batteries. The EVA lasted 6 hours and 32 minutes.

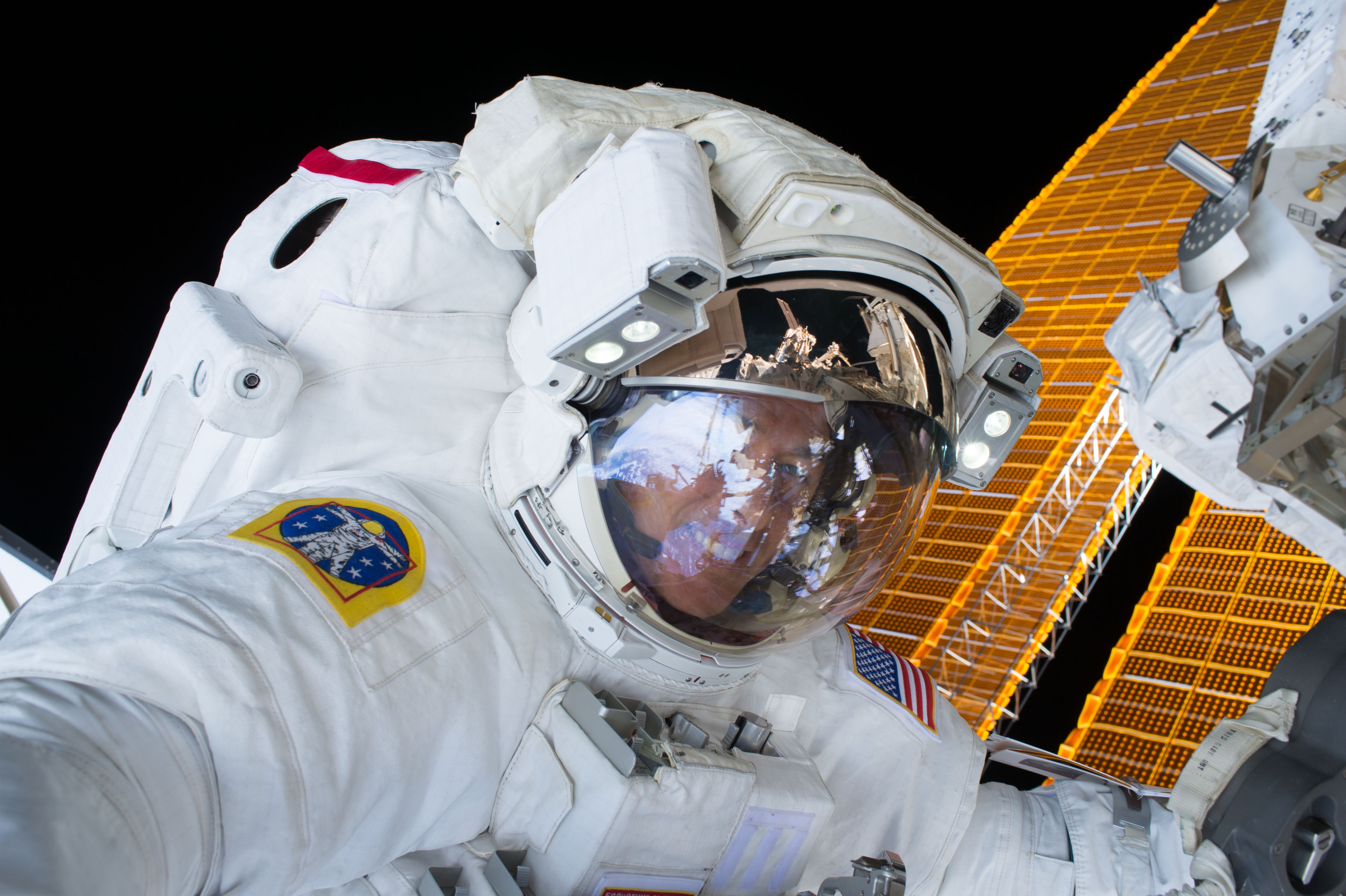
Kimbrough during an EVA with Peggy Whitson

Kimbrough performed his fourth EVA with astronaut Thomas Pesquet on January 13, 2017. During the EVA, they prepared the infrastructure to replace the ISS batteries. The EVA lasted for 5 hours and 58 minutes.

On March 23, 2017, Kimbrough performed his fifth EVA with Thomas Pesquet. The main objective was to prepare the Pressurized Mating Adapter-3 (PMA-3) for installation of the second International Docking Adapter, which will accommodate commercial crew vehicle dockings. The EVA lasted for 6 hours and 34 minutes.

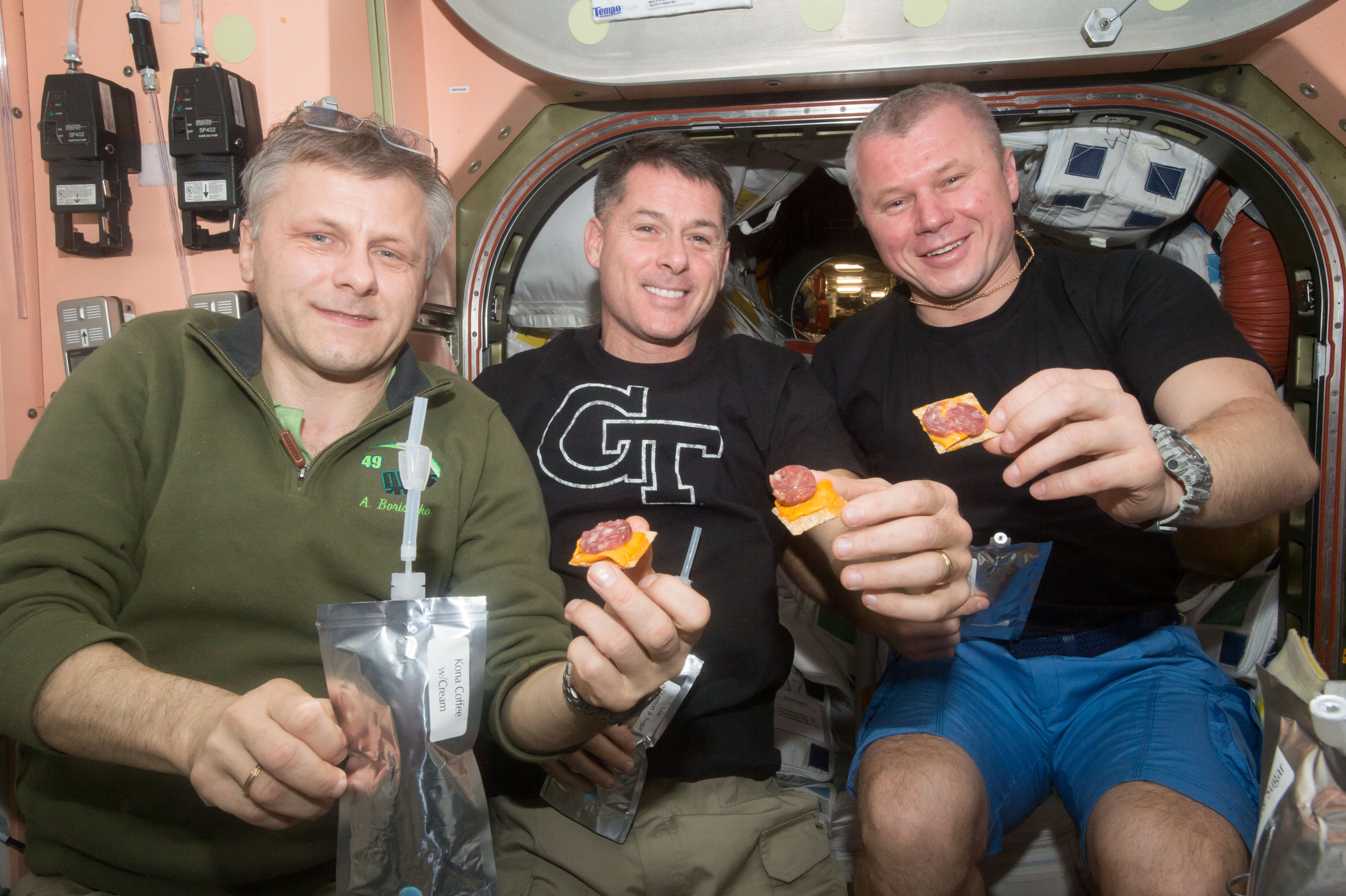
Kimbrough photographed during a meal with crew members Andrei Borisenko and Oleg Novitskiy

On March 30, 2017, Kimbrough performed his sixth EVA with Peggy Whitson. During the EVA they connected the PMA-3 as well as installing new shields in Node 3 axial shields after losing one shield. Additionally installed another upgraded computer relay boxes on the station's truss. The EVA lasted 7 hours and 4 minutes. During this EVA Whitson became the record holder for the most EVAs (eight) for a woman.

Kimbrough carried a soccer ball recovered from the wreckage of the Space Shuttle Challenger to the ISS, after which it was returned to the family of Challenger astronaut Ellison Onizuka and put on display at Clear Lake High School in Houston.

=== Expedition 65/66 ===
In July 2020, NASA announced that Kimbrough would fly to space for the third time as commander of SpaceX Crew-2 along with NASA astronaut Megan McArthur, JAXA astronaut Akihiko Hoshide, and ESA astronaut Thomas Pesquet. Crew-2 launched and docked with the ISS on April 24, 2021, beginning their 6 month mission.

During his stay on the ISS, he performed 3 EVAs to install the iROSA solar arrays on the P6 Truss, with Thomas Pesquet. Some of the experiments he did included Earth observations, protein crystal growth and cultivating cotton and peppers.

Crew-2 splashed down off the coast of Florida on November 9, 2021 after a 199-day mission.

=== Retirement ===
Kimbrough retired from NASA on July 31, 2022.

Preceded by Anatoli Ivanishin	ISS Commander (Expedition 50); 30 October 2016 to 10 April 2017	Succeeded by Peggy Whitson
