= Oleg Novitsky =

Russian cosmonaut (born 1971)

- Олег Новицкий
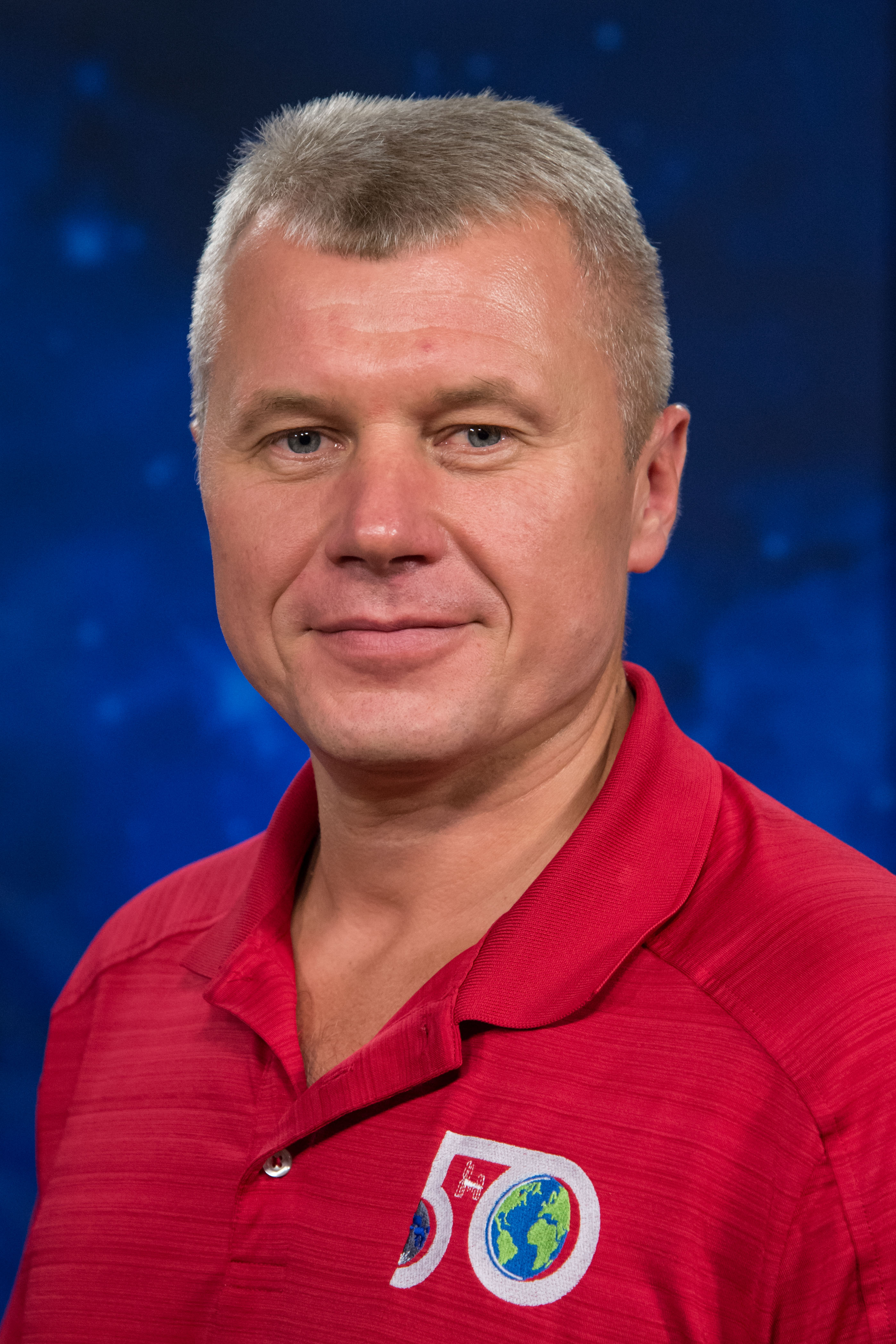
- Novitskiy in 2016
- Born: October 12, 1971 (age 55); Chervyen, Minsk Voblast, Byelorussian SSR, USSR (now Belarus)
- Awards: Hero of the Russian Federation
- Space career

Roscosmos cosmonaut
- Status: Retired
- Rank: Lieutenant-Colonel, Russian Air Force
- Time in space: 545 days, 1 hour, 39 minutes
- Selection: 2006 TsPK-14 Cosmonaut Group
- Total EVAs: 3
- Total EVA time: 22 hours, 38 minutes
- Mission: Soyuz TMA-06M (Expedition 33/34), Soyuz MS-03 (Expedition 50/51), Soyuz MS-18 (Expedition 64/65), Soyuz MS-25/Soyuz MS-24
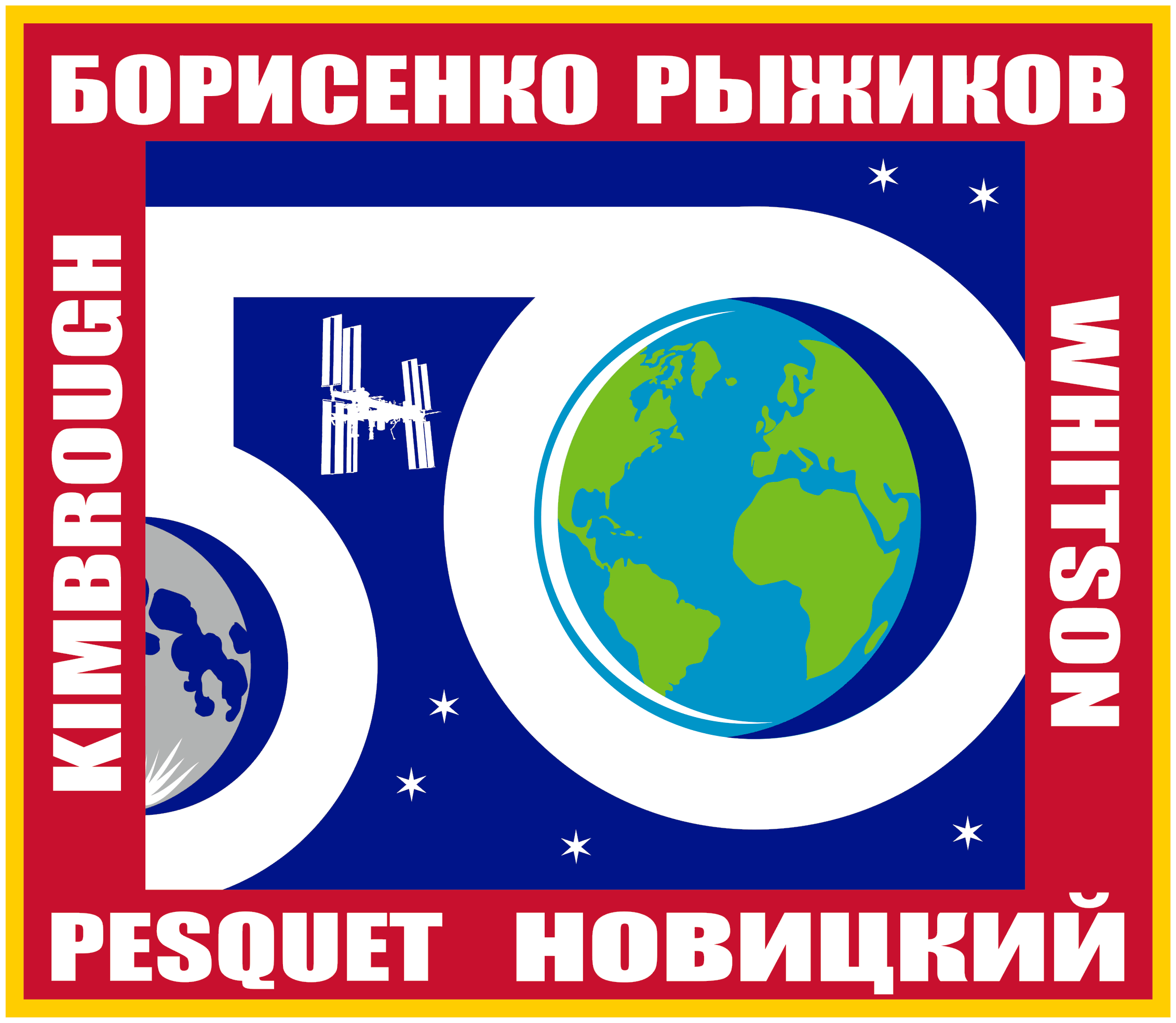
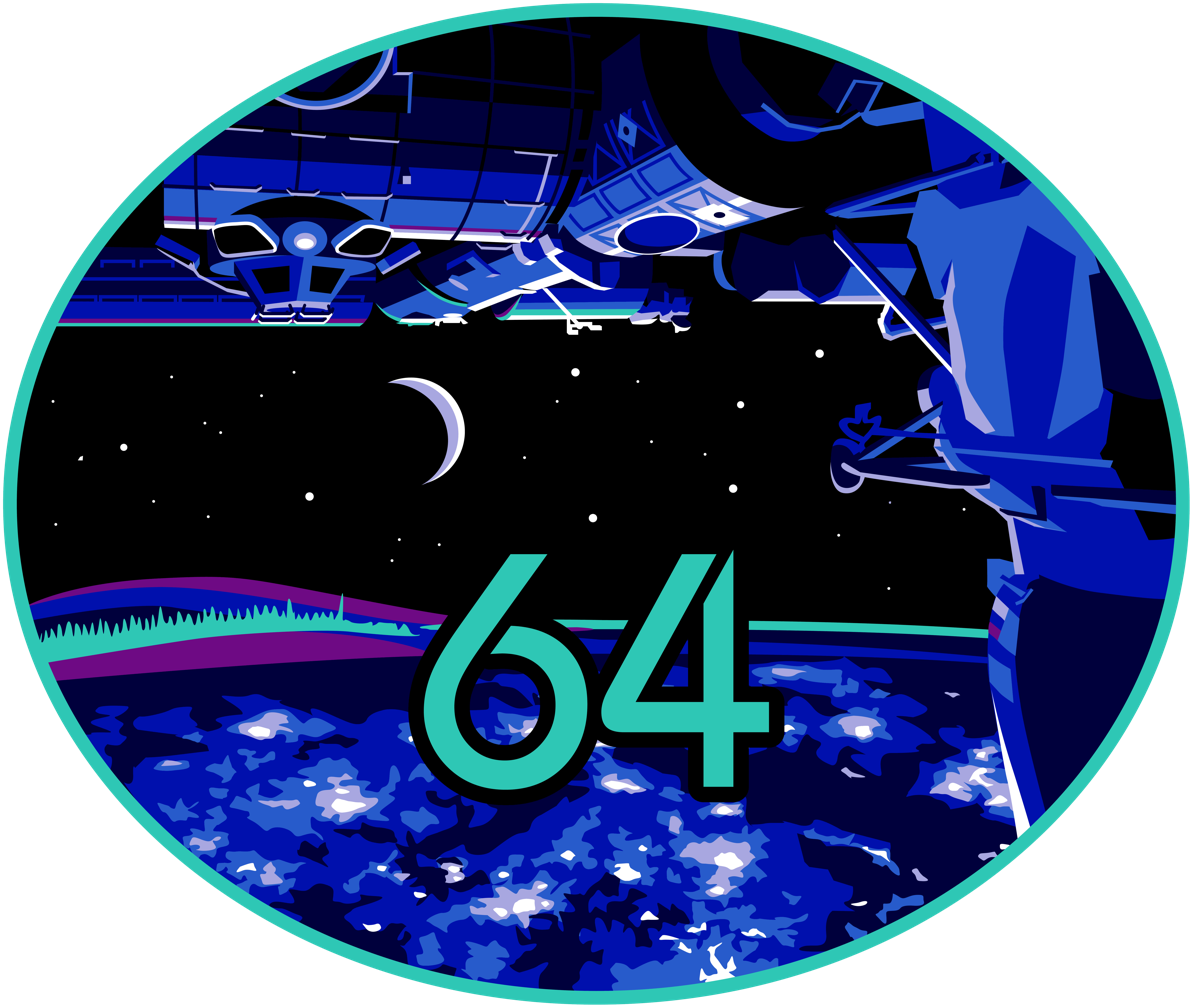
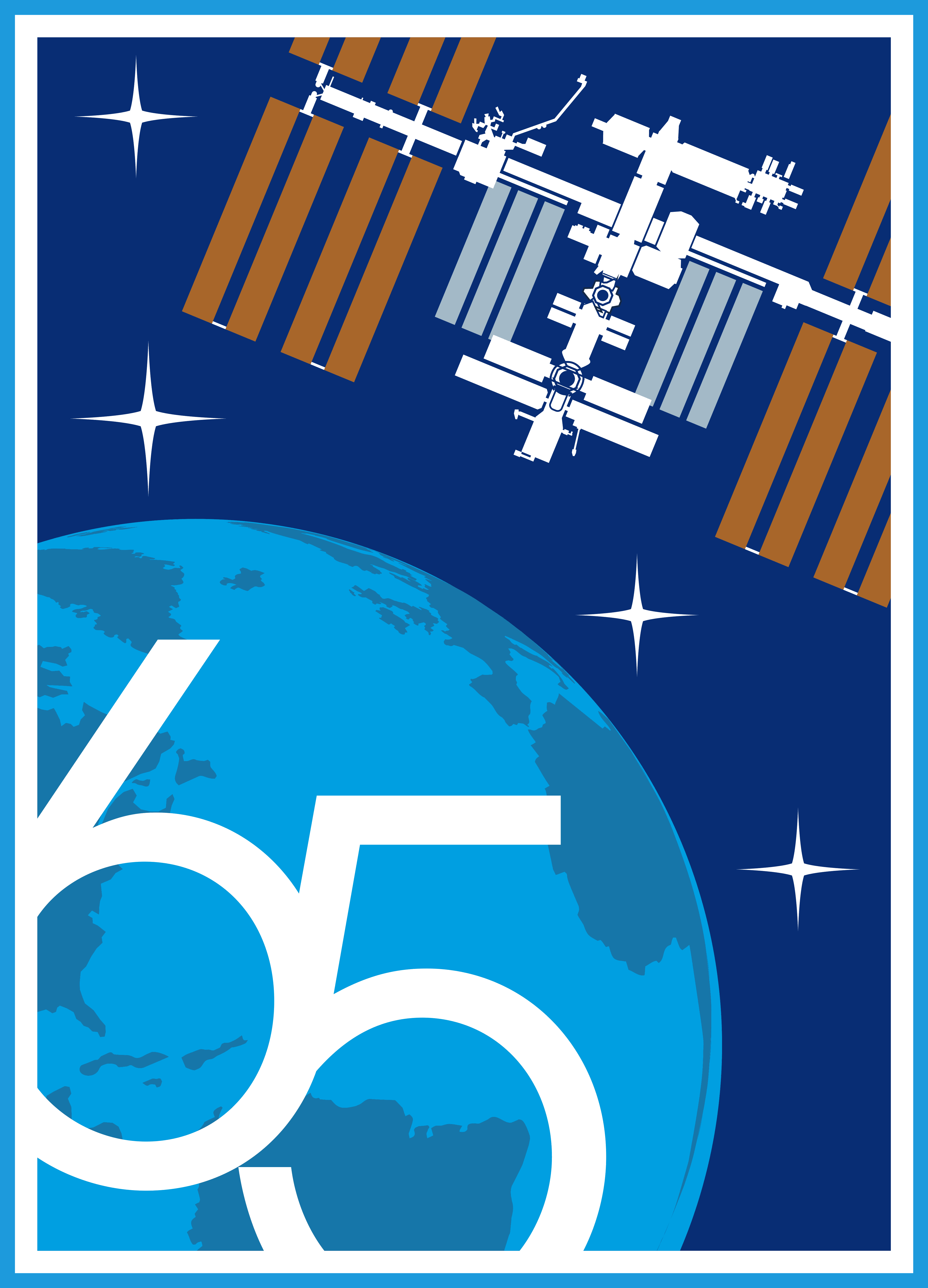
- Mission insignia
- Retired: June 2025

Oleg Viktorovich Novitsky (Russian: Олег Викторович Новицкий; also tr. Novitskiy; born October 12, 1971) is a former Lieutenant Colonel in the Russian Air Force who logged over 700 hours of flight time and was awarded for bravery. He also served as a Russian cosmonaut with Roscosmos and participated in multiple expeditions, during which he spent over 545 days in space.

== Biography ==
Novitsky was born on October 12, 1971, in Cherven, a Belarusian town of Minsk Region. He graduated from school No.2 in Cherven in 1988 and entered the Borisoglebsk Military Pilot School named after V. Chkalov.

In 1994 he graduated from the Kachinskoye Military Pilot School named after A. Myasnikov, where he studied at the department specializing in command tactical aviation. Novitsky was certified as a pilot-engineer. Between September and December 1995, Novitsky served as a pilot-instructor in the fighter aviation regiment of V. Chkalov Training Center. From December 1995 to June 2004 he served in a variety of positions, from pilot to air squadron deputy commander at the fighter air regiment of the 1st Guard Composite Air Division of the 4th Air Army and Air Defense Army of the North Caucasus Military Command.

Graduated in 2006 from the Yuri Gagarin Air Force Academy specializing in military units/Air Force detachments management. After graduation from the Academy Novitsky was a commander of an attack air squadron. By the time of selection to the Cosmonaut Corps he has mastered skills of piloting the Л-39 and Су-25 aircraft. He has logged a total of 700 hours of flight time. He is a Class 2 military pilot. Novitsky is a qualified paratrooper instructor and military diver.

== Spaceflight experience ==
Novitsky was selected as a cosmonaut in 2006. Between February 2007 and July 2009 he completed basic spaceflight training and passed state exams with excellent grades. On August 1, 2009, he was qualified as a test-cosmonaut by the Interdepartmental Qualification Board, and between August 2009 and March 2010 he took the ISS advanced training course.

=== Expedition 33/34 ===
From March 2010 to May 2012 he trained as the ISS Expedition 31/32 backup crew member, the Soyuz TMA-M Commander/ISS Flight Engineer. Part of Expedition 33/34 to the international space station where he served as ISS flight engineer. He was launched to space as part of the Soyuz TMA-06M crew on October 23, 2012, and returned on March 16, 2013. Overall time in space was 143 days 16 hours and 15 minutes.

=== Expedition 50/51 ===
Novitsky returned to space as part of Expedition 50/51, which launched on November 17, 2016 aboard Soyuz MS-03.

On June 2, 2017, MS-03 undocked from the ISS, carrying Novitsky and Thomas Pesquet back to Earth after 196 days in space. Peggy Whitson remained on the ISS and returned on Soyuz MS-04. Soyuz MS-03 touched down just over 3 hours after undocking, concluding Novitsky's second spaceflight.

=== Expedition 64/65 ===
Novitsky returned to space for the third time in April 2021, launching aboard Soyuz MS-18, alongside Roscosmos cosmonaut Pyotr Dubrov and American astronaut Mark T. Vande Hei. Novitsky landed on MS-18 on 17 October 2021 with actress Yulia Peresild and director Klim Shipenko.

=== Soyuz MS-25/MS-24 ===
Novitsky was elected commander of Soyuz MS-25. He flew with Belarusian cosmonaut Marina Vasilevskaya and NASA astronaut Tracy Caldwell Dyson. Novitsky and Vasilevskaya spent 13 days at the station and returned on Soyuz MS-24 with NASA astronaut Loral O'Hara.

== Cinematography ==
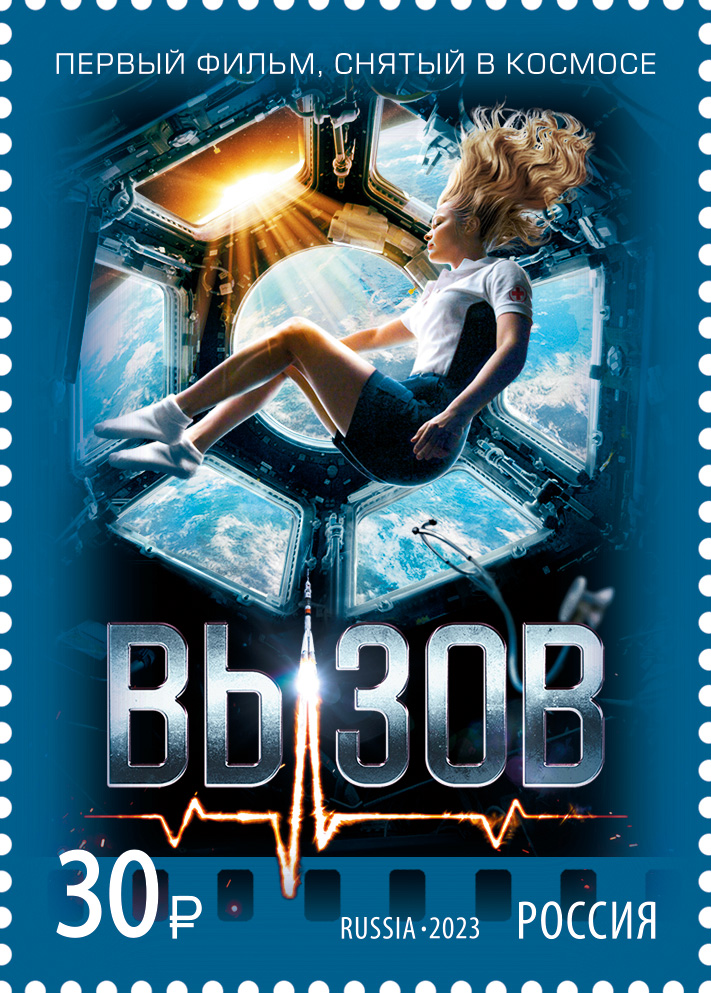
Russian stamp dedicated to the film The Challenge

Cosmonaut Anton Shkaplerov (commander) and Klim Shipenko, the director of the film The Challenge together with the film's star, Yulia Peresild, will go to the ISS on the Soyuz MS-19 scheduled for October 5, 2021. The drama is a joint project of Roscosmos, Russia's Channel One and the Yellow, Black and White studio. Since May 24 the crew members have been training at the Yuri Gagarin Cosmonaut Training Center. Alternates trained for the mission and filming are actress Alyona Mordovina and director Alexey Dudin and the commander Oleg Artemyev. On July 23, 2021, the prime crew participated in a four-hour simulation inside a Soyuz replica while wearing the Sokol suit, and on July 30, the spacecraft began its pre-launch preparation.

The director and actress returned to Earth on October 17, 2021, on Soyuz MS-18, with Commander Oleg Novitsky, who will play the role of a cosmonaut who needs medical assistance in the film. Cosmonaut Pyotr Dubrov and astronaut Mark Vande Hei, who arrived at the ISS on Soyuz MS-18, joined Shkaplerov on the return of Soyuz MS-19. Soyuz MS-19 landed on 30 March 2022.

=== Movie portion to be shot on ISS ===
Klim Shipenko shot about 35–40 minutes of film on the ISS, as well as taking on the position of director, operator, art director, and makeup artist. Oleg Novitsky and Pyotr Dubrov will appear in the film, with Dubrov and Mark Vande Hei assisting in the production. Shkaplerov will appear in some scenes of the movie.

== Honors and awards ==
Ministry of Defense of Russian Federation medals:

- Hero of the Russian Federation
- “For Participation in Military Operations”
- “For Military Virtue”, II degree
- “For Distinguished Military Service”, I, II and III degree
- “For Service in the Air Force”.
- Veteran of Military Operations

== See also ==
- List of Heroes of the Russian Federation
