= Christmas on the International Space Station =

Christmas traditions and celebration in the International Space Station

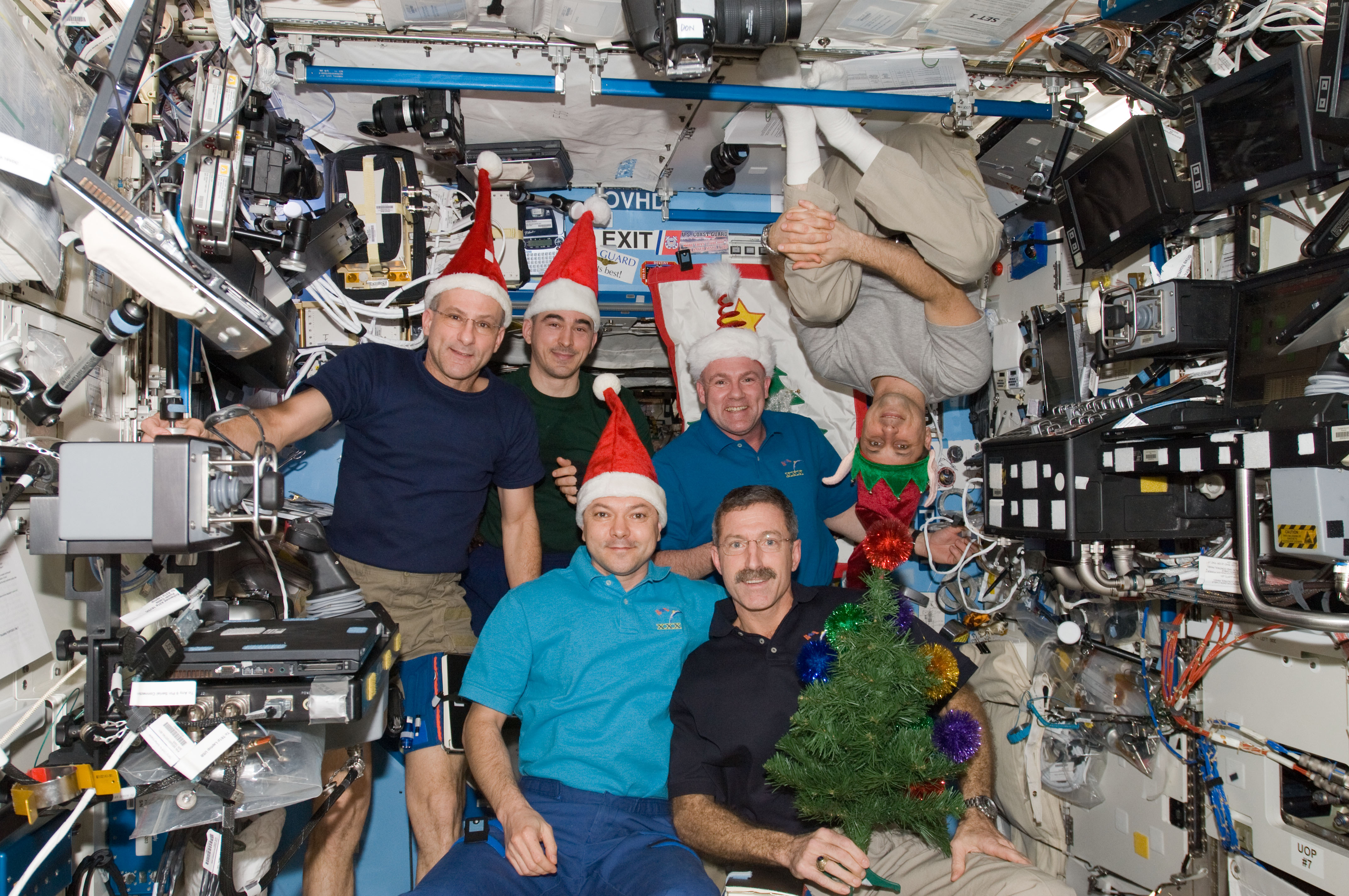
Expedition 30 in a Christmas time crew photo, 25 December 2011

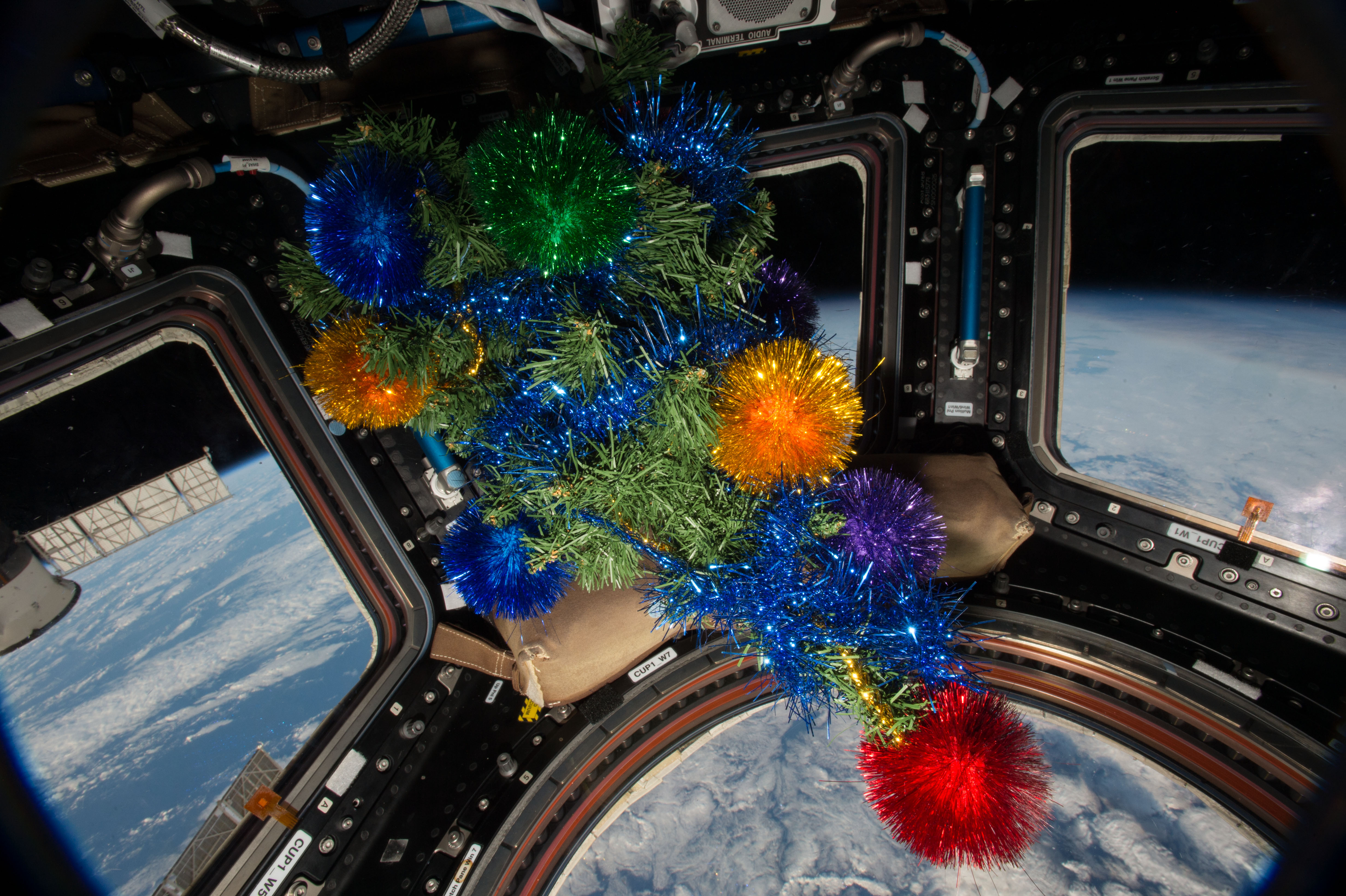
A Christmas tree floating in the Cupola, December 2015

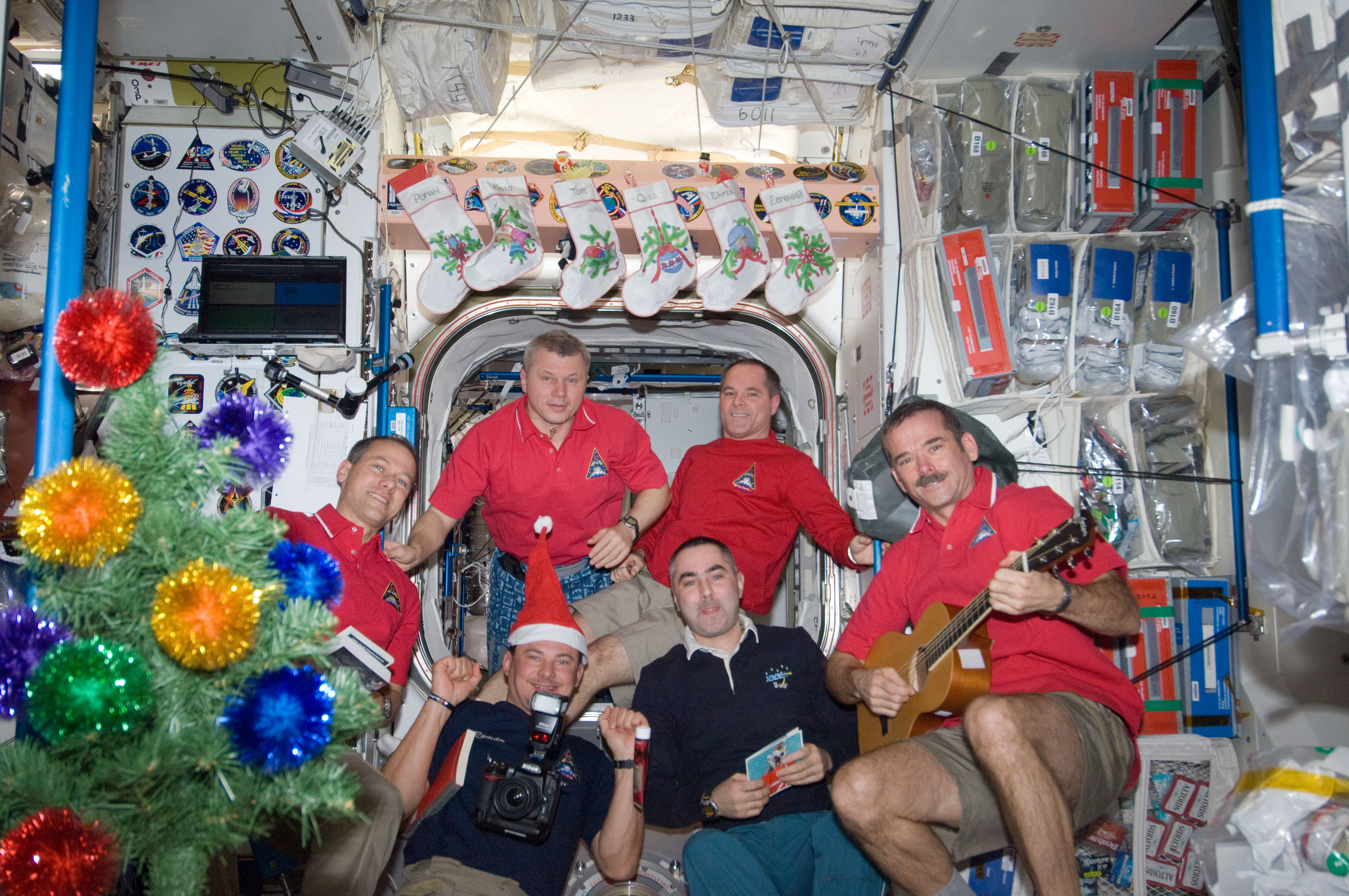
Expedition 34 crew members assemble in Node 1 on Christmas Eve, 2012.

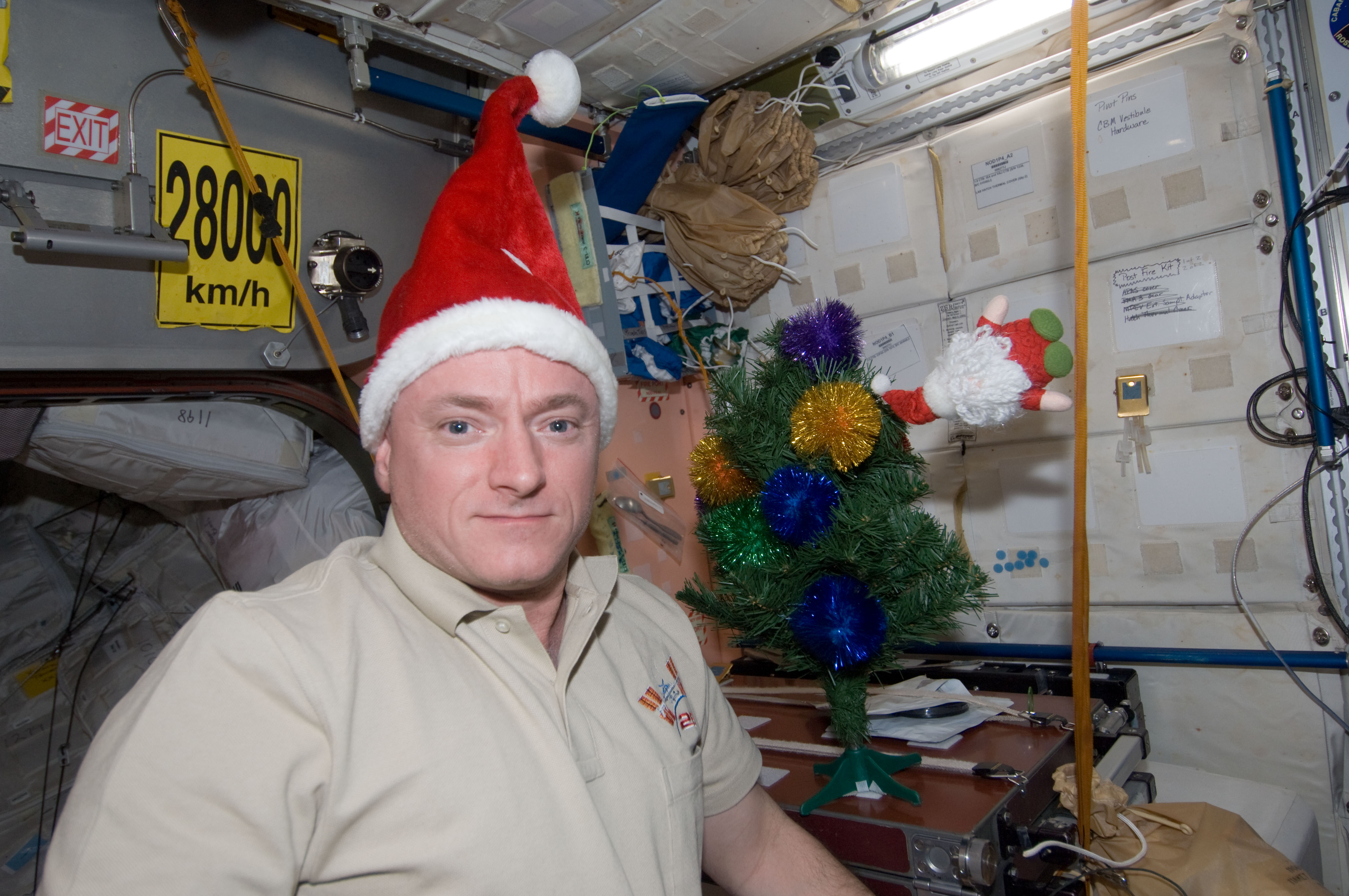
Astronaut Scott Kelly with Santa Claus hat

Christmas on the International Space Station covers the celebration of Christmas on the International Space Station. Christmas is celebrated each year by the International Space Station crew, their families, and ground-staff. Crew are given time off duty according to their respective culture, religion/faith and ethnicity. The Russian Orthodox Church celebrates Christmas according to the Julian calendar, whilst the Catholic Church and the various Protestant denominations use the Gregorian calendar so the crew may celebrate Christmas more than once on the station choosing between 25 December or 6, 7 or 19 January.

== History ==
Expedition 1 arrived on the ISS on 2 November 2000, celebrating their first Christmas on board the station later that year. Other celebrations included Expedition 30, with the arrival of Donald Pettit, Oleg Kononenko, and André Kuipers. The station has been continuously occupied since 2000, so every Christmas has been experienced by a crew. The holiday is popular enough that one of the traditions that has developed is having a Christmas dinner.

On 25 December 2011, the crew of Expedition 30 took a break on Christmas to take a crew photo. This included Dan Burbank, Oleg Kononenko, Don Pettit, Anatoly Ivanishin, Andre Kuipers, and Anton Shkaplerov.

On 24 December 2013, astronauts made a rare Christmas Eve extravehicular activity, installing a new ammonia pump for the station's cooling system. The faulty cooling system had failed earlier in the month, halting many of the station's science experiments. Astronauts had to brave a "mini blizzard" of noxious ammonia while installing the new pump. It was only the second Christmas Eve spacewalk in NASA history.

On 25 December 2016, the crew celebrated Christmas by floating in micro-gravity and opening Christmas presents recently delivered on a Japanese cargo spacecraft. One astronaut wore a Santa hat in orbit. The French astronaut, Thomas Pesquet, shared special French food with station crew. Pesquet also made a Christmas-time special video for the ESA.

== See also ==
- Religion in space
