= Expedition 73 =

Long-duration mission to the International Space Station

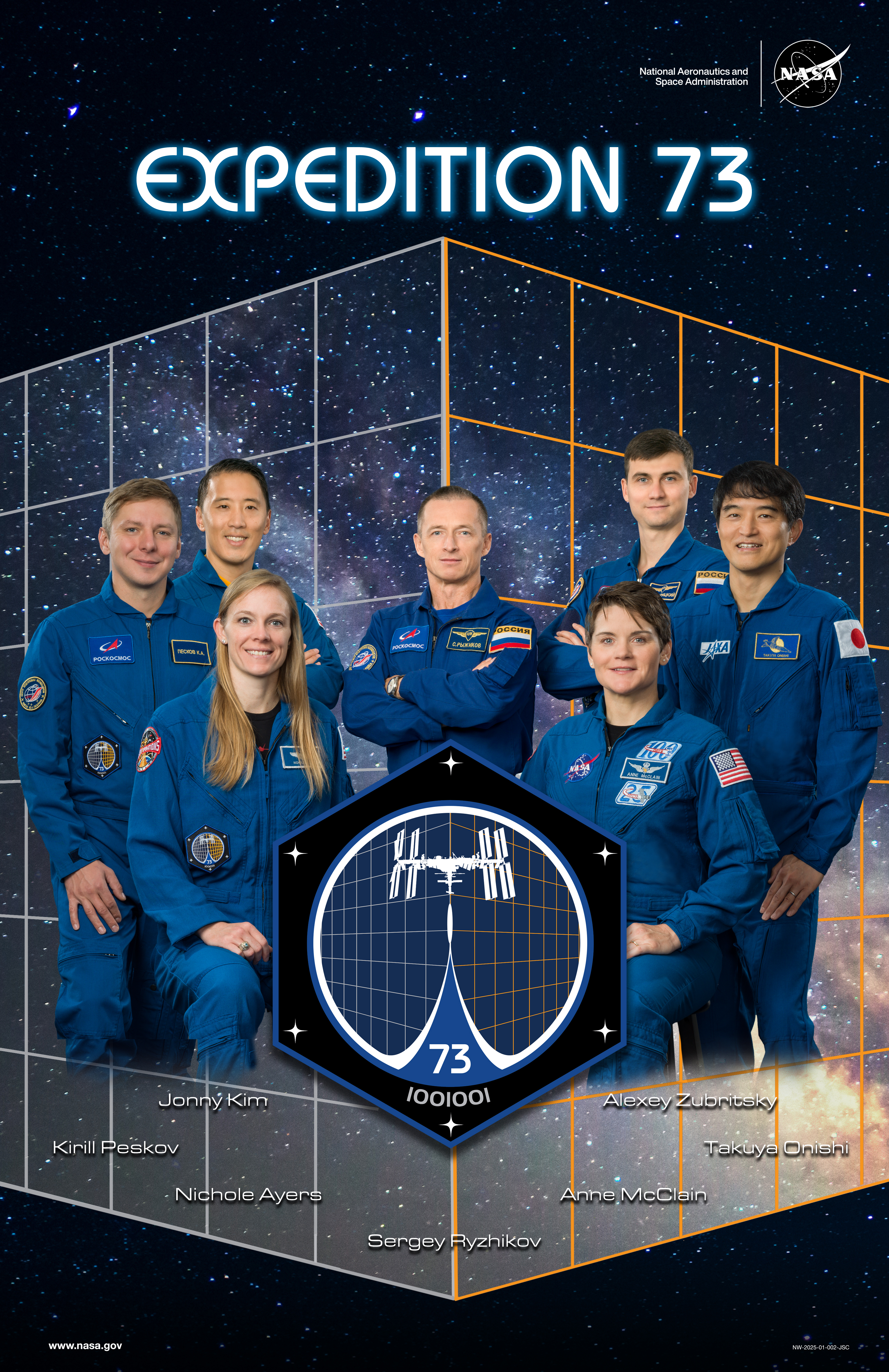
- First-half crew Promotional Poster
- Mission type: Long-duration expedition
- Operator: NASA / Roscosmos
- Mission duration: 233 days, 3 hours and 43 minutes

Expedition
- Space station: International Space Station
- Began: 19 April 2025
- Ended: 9 December 2025
- Arrived aboard: SpaceX Crew-10; Soyuz MS-27; SpaceX Crew-11; Soyuz MS-28
- Departed aboard: SpaceX Crew-10; Soyuz MS-27

Crew
- Crew size: 7–11
- Members: Expedition 72/73: Anne McClain; Nichole Ayers; Takuya Onishi; Kirill Peskov; Sergey Ryzhikov; Alexey Zubritsky; Jonny Kim; Expedition 73/74: Zena Cardman; Michael Fincke; Kimiya Yui; Oleg Platonov; Sergey Kud-Sverchkov; Sergey Mikayev; Christopher Williams
- EVAs: 3
- EVA duration: 18 hours, 47 minutes
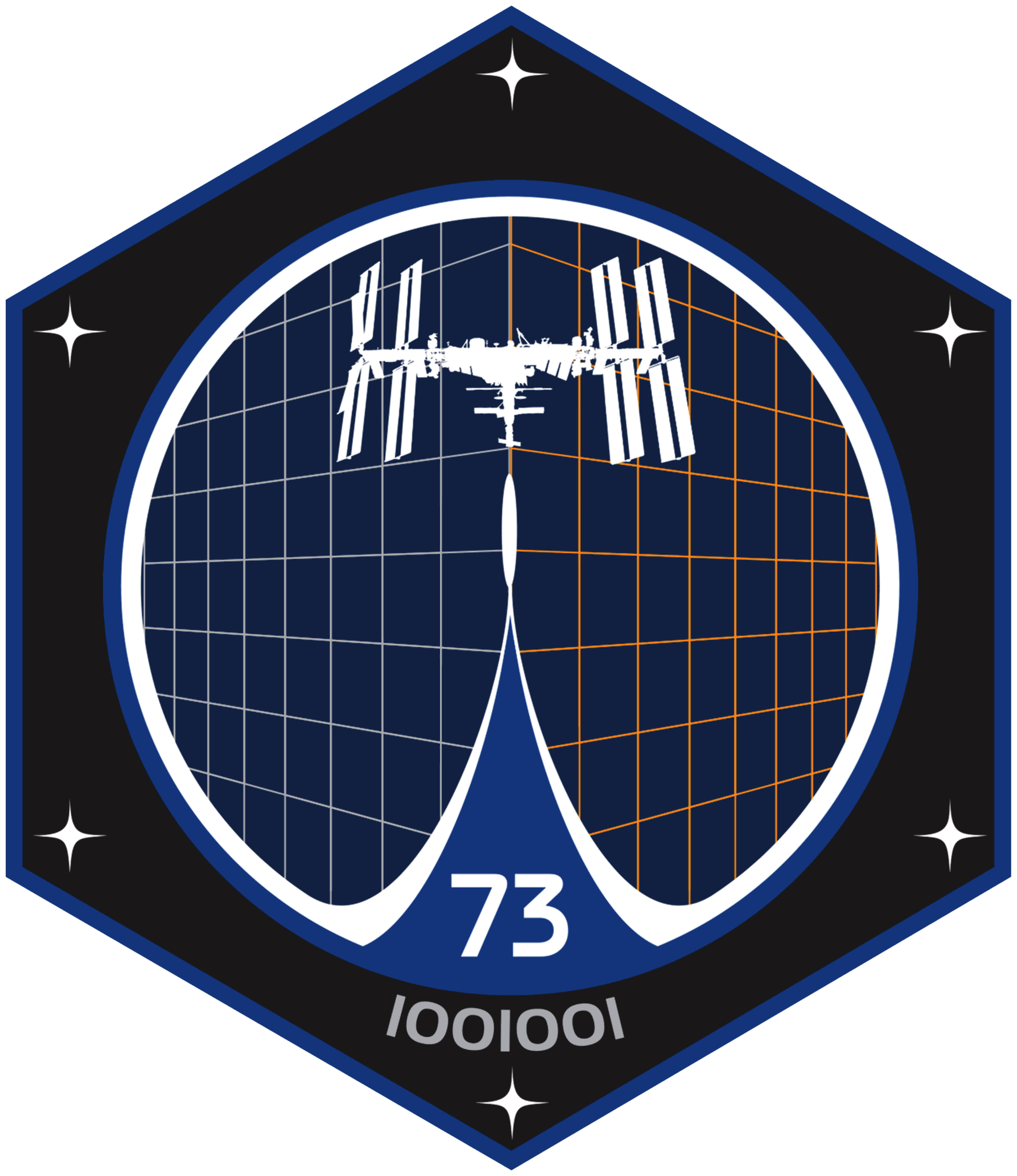
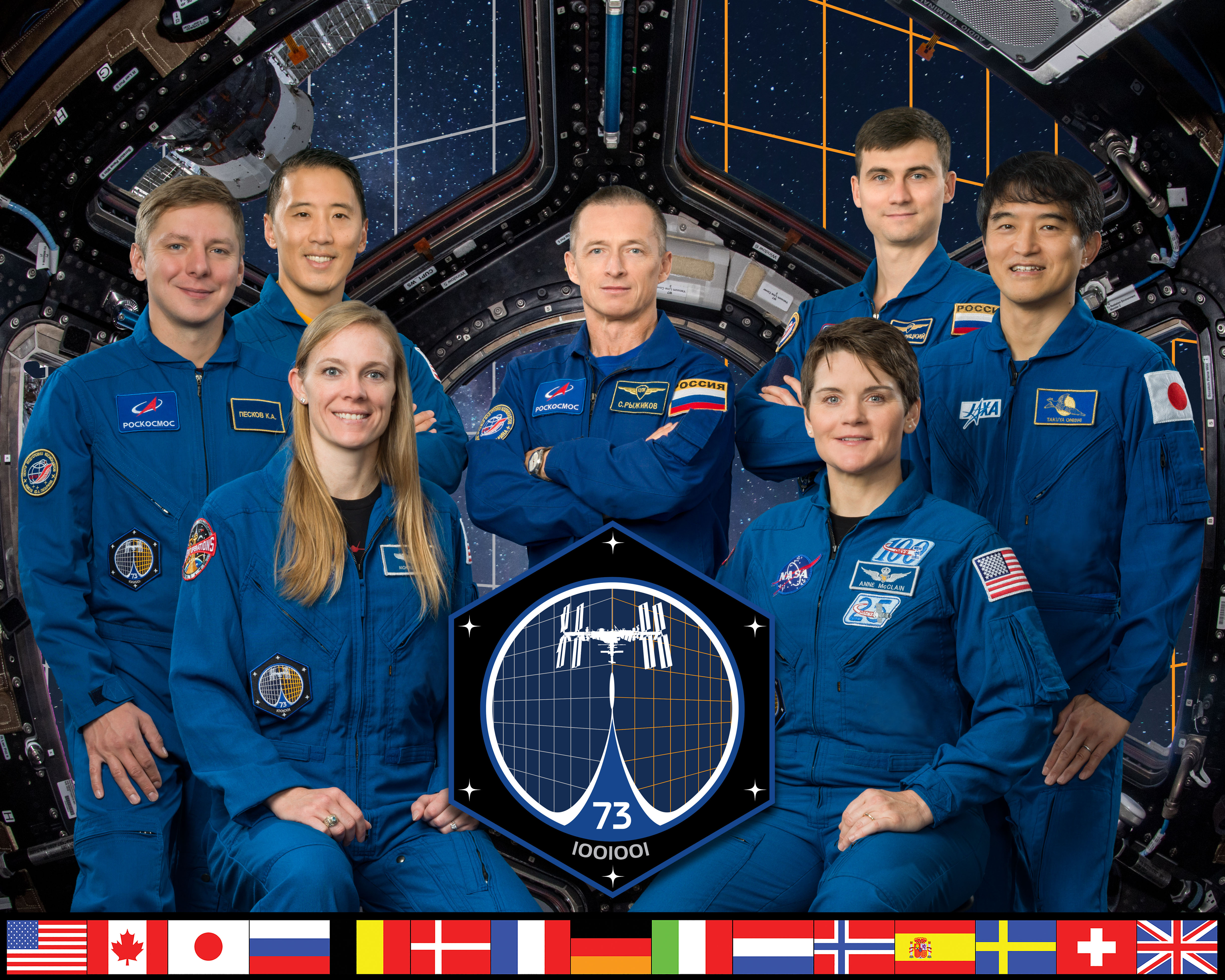
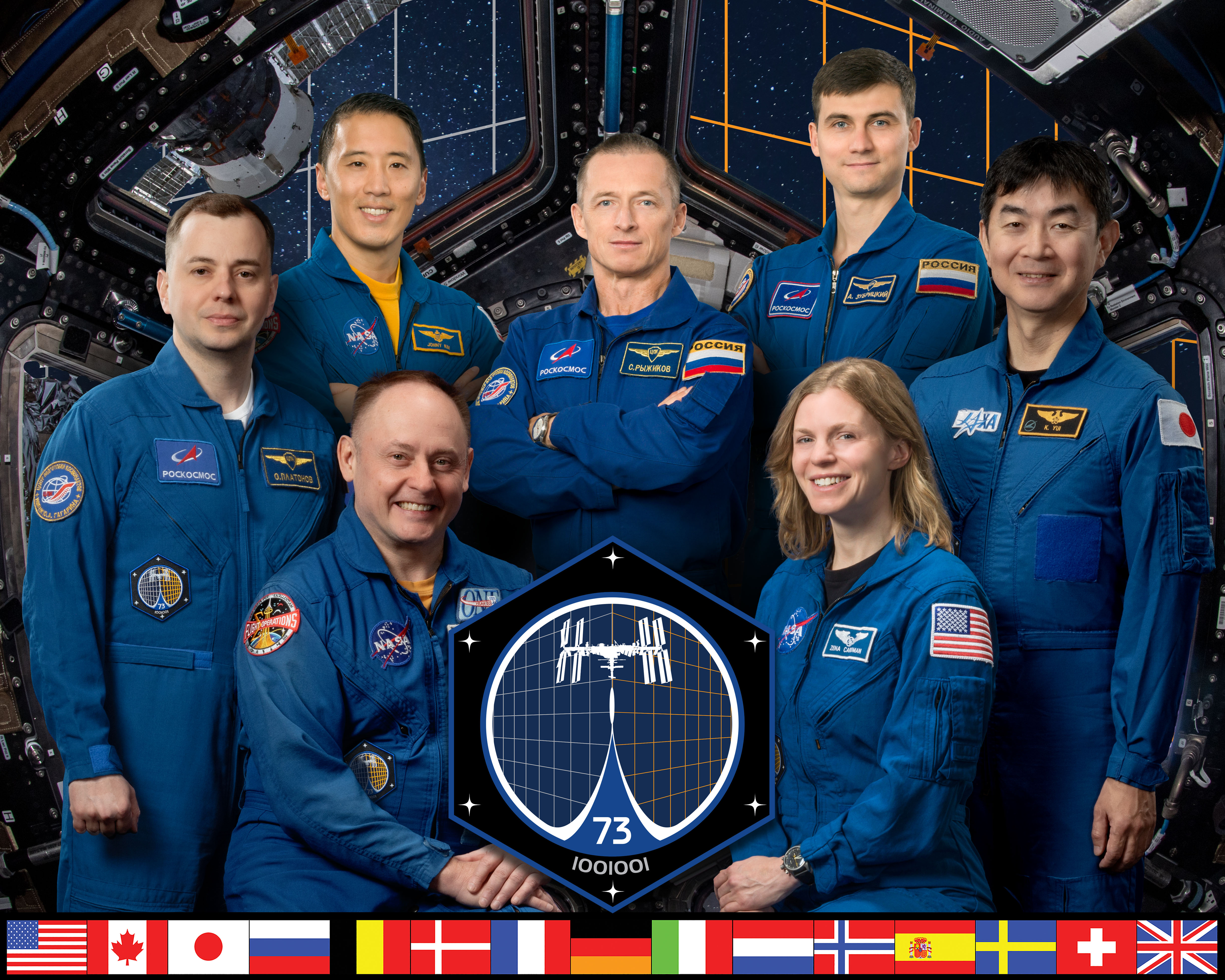
- Expedition 73 mission patch: The first half crew, from left to right, top row: Peskov, Kim, Ryzhikov, Zubritsky, and Onishi Bottom row: Ayers and McClain; The second half crew, from left to right, top row: Platonov, Kim, Ryzhikov, Zubritsky, and Yui Bottom row: Fincke and Cardman; Expeditions

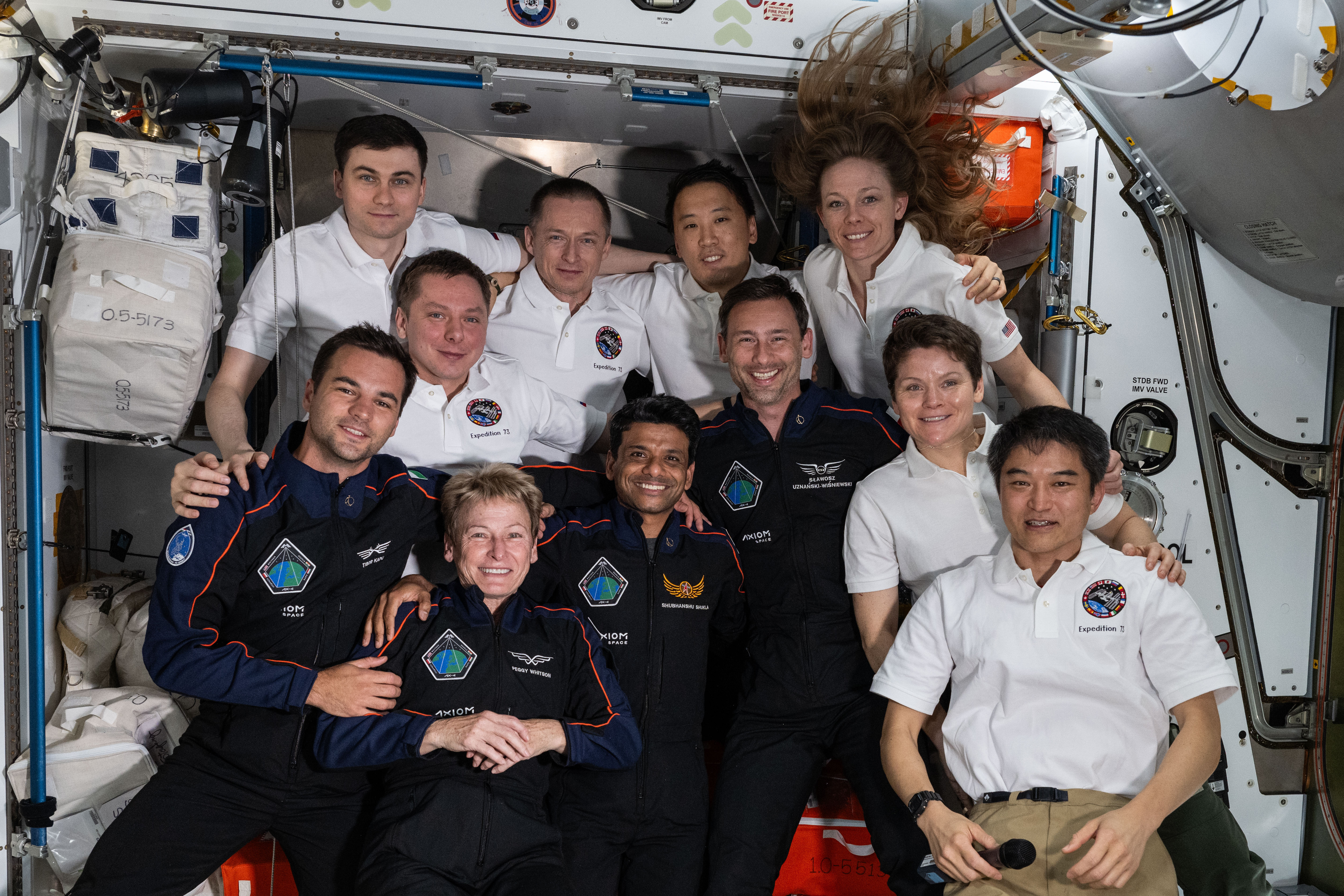
Axiom Mission 4 (black jumpsuits) and Expedition 73 first-half (white jumpsuit) crews

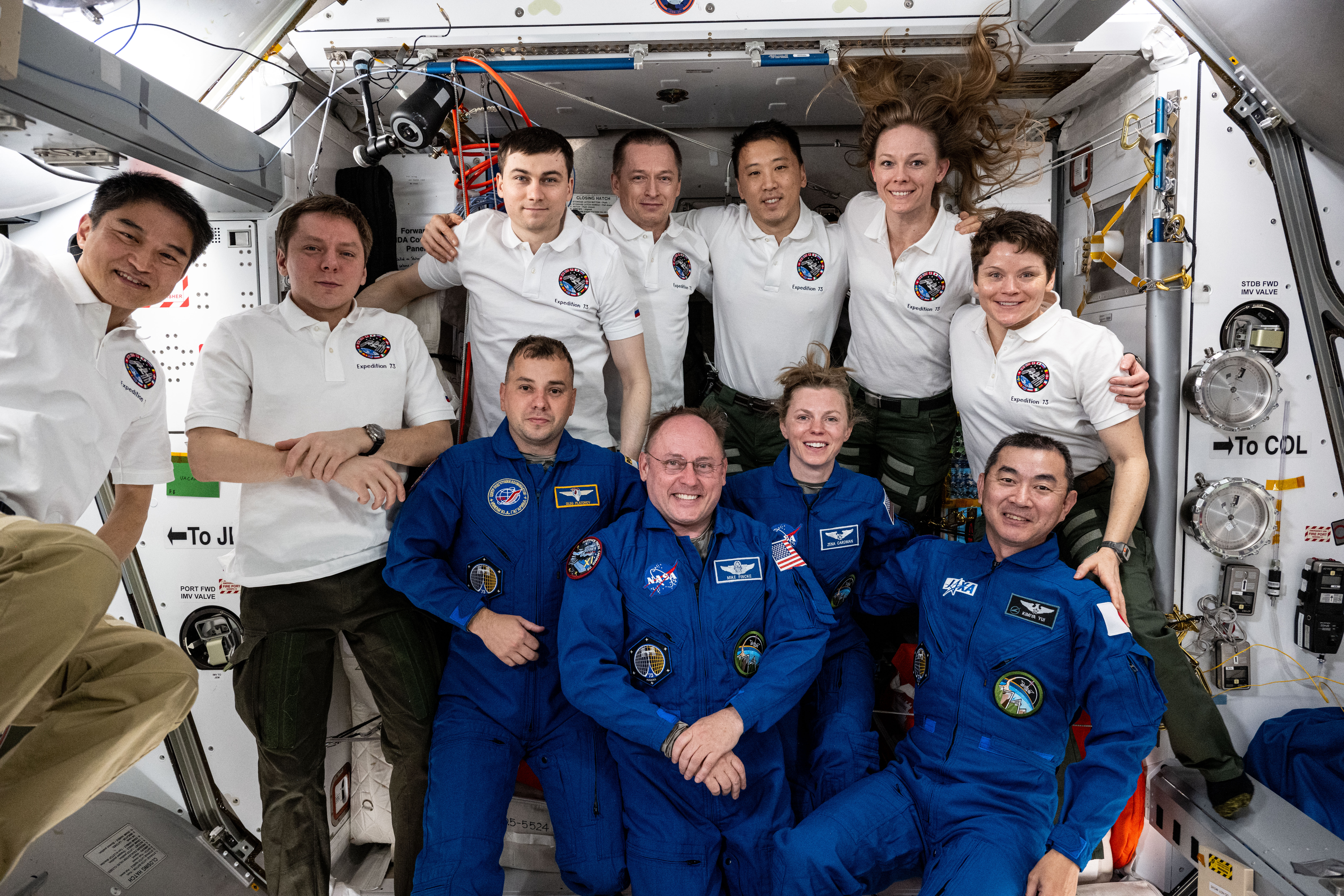
Expedition 73 crew

Expedition 73 was the 73rd long-duration expedition to the International Space Station (ISS). The expedition began with the departure of Soyuz MS-26 on 19 April 2025 with JAXA astronaut Takuya Onishi taking over the ISS command and concluded with the undocking of Soyuz MS-27 on 9 December 2025. It continued the extensive scientific research conducted aboard the ISS, focusing on various fields, including biology, human physiology, physics, and materials science. The crew members also maintained and upgraded the space station systems.

== Background, Crew, and Events ==
The expedition commenced with a crew consisting of NASA astronauts Anne McClain, Nichole Ayers, and Jonny Kim, JAXA astronaut Takuya Onishi, and Roscosmos cosmonauts Kirill Peskov, Sergey Ryzhikov, and Alexey Zubritsky.

The expedition saw three spacewalks. On May 1, 2025, McClain and Ayers performed a 5-hour, 44-minute EVA to install a modification kit on the port side of the station’s truss structure enabling the future installation of its seventh iROSA and relocated an antenna that communicates with approaching and departing commercial crew and cargo spacecraft.

On June 26, 2025, the crew was joined by the staff of Axiom Mission 4's Crew Dragon Grace: commander Peggy Whitson of the United States, pilot Shubhanshu Shukla of India, and mission specialists Sławosz Uznański-Wiśniewski of Poland and Tibor Kapu of Hungary. Their mission marked India, Poland, and Hungary's return to crewed spaceflight for the first time in over 40 years. During their two-week stay aboard the ISS, the astronauts carried out 60 experiments planned by 31 different countries.

SpaceX Crew-11 arrived at the ISS on August 2, transporting NASA astronauts Zena Cardman and Michael Fincke, JAXA astronaut Kimiya Yui, and Roscosmos cosmonaut Oleg Platonov. The mission featured a handover with Crew-10 of six days. Onishi handed over command of the space station to Ryzhikov on August 5. Crew-10 departed with McClain, Ayers, Onishi, and Peskov on August 8.

On October 16, Ryzhikov and Zubritsky performed a 6-hour, 9-minute spacewalk to install the Ekran-M payload onto the Nauka module frame, jettisoned some cameras and a mounting platform, cleaned the windows on Zvezda service module, and removed a SSK panel and a Biorisk container. On October 28, Ryzhikov and Zubritsky performed a 6-hour, 54-minute spacewalk to install the final set of payloads onto the Nauka module frame the IPI plasma injector into slots two and three, relocate the ERA control panel, clean the Nauka science window, and replace a cassette in the Ekran-M payload.

Soyuz MS-28 arrived at the station on November 27, 2025, transporting NASA astronaut Christopher Williams and Roscosmos cosmonauts Sergey Kud-Sverchkov and Sergey Mikayev.

On December 1, 2025, following the reberthing of Cygnus NG-23 to the Unity module, all eight ISS docking ports were simultaneously occupied for the first time in the station's operation. Cygnus had been temporarily positioned on Canadarm2 on November 24 to clear the approach corridor for Soyuz MS-28 at the Rassvet nadir port. At this time, the station hosted eight visiting vehicles: two SpaceX Dragon 2 spacecraft (Crew-11 and CRS-33), the Northrop Grumman Cygnus XL freighter (NG-23), the JAXA's HTV-X cargo ship (HTV-X1), Roscosmos Soyuz MS crew vehicles (MS-27 and MS-28), and two Progress MS cargo spacecraft (MS-31 and MS-32).

After a handover period, Ryzhikov transferred command of the ISS to Fincke on December 7. The expedition concluded on December 9 with the departure of Ryzhikov, Zubritsky, and Kim aboard Soyuz MS-27.

== Events manifest ==
Events involving crewed spacecraft are listed in bold.

Previous mission: Expedition 72

- 19 April 2025 - **Soyuz MS-26 undocking, official switch from Expedition 72**
- 22 April 2025 - CRS SpX-32 docking
- 1 May 2025 - EVA 1 (US-93) McClain/Ayers: 5 hrs, 44 mins
- 23 May 2025 - CRS SpX-32 undocking
- 26 June 2025 - **Axiom Mission 4 docking (non-Expedition crew)**
- 1 July 2025 - Progress MS-29 undocking
- 5 July 2025 - Progress MS-31 docking
- 14 July 2025 - **Axiom Mission 4 undocking (non-Expedition crew)**
- 2 August 2025 - **SpaceX Crew-11 docking**
- 5 August 2025 - ISS Expedition 73 change of command from Takuya Onishi to Sergey Ryzhikov
- 8 August 2025 - **SpaceX Crew-10 undocking**
- 25 August 2025 - CRS SpX-33 docking
- 9 September 2025 - Progress MS-30 undocking
- 13 September 2025 - Progress MS-32 docking
- 18 September 2025 - CRS NG-23 capture and berthing
- 16 October 2025 - EVA 2 (VKD-64) Ryzhikov/Zubritsky: 6 hrs, 9 mins
- 28 October 2025 - EVA 3 (VKD-65) Ryzhikov/Zubritsky: 6 hrs, 54 mins
- 29 October 2025 - HTV-X1 capture and berthing
- 24 November 2025 - CRS NG-23 unberthing
- 27 November 2025 - **Soyuz MS-28 docking**
- 1 December 2025 - CRS NG-23 reberthing
- 7 December 2025 - ISS Expedition 73/74 change of command from Sergey Ryzhikov to Michael Fincke
- 9 December 2025 - **Soyuz MS-27 undocking, official switch to Expedition 74**

Next mission: Expedition 74

== Crew ==
Flight	Astronaut	Increment 73a	Increment 73b	Increment 73c	Increment 73d
Flight	Astronaut	19 Apr-2 Aug 2025	2-8 Aug 2025	8 Aug-27 Nov 2025	27 Nov-9 Dec 2025
Soyuz MS-27	Sergey Ryzhikov, Roscosmos; Third spaceflight	Flight engineer		Commander	
Soyuz MS-27	Alexey Zubritsky, Roscosmos; First spaceflight	Flight engineer			
Soyuz MS-27	Jonny Kim, NASA; Only spaceflight	Flight engineer			
SpaceX Crew-10	Anne McClain, NASA; Second spaceflight	Flight engineer		Off station	
SpaceX Crew-10	Nichole Ayers, NASA; First spaceflight	Flight engineer		Off station	
SpaceX Crew-10	Takuya Onishi, JAXA; Second spaceflight	Commander		Off station	
SpaceX Crew-10	Kirill Peskov, Roscosmos; First spaceflight	Flight engineer		Off station	
SpaceX Crew-11	Zena Cardman, NASA; First spaceflight	Off station	Flight engineer		
SpaceX Crew-11	Michael Fincke, NASA; Fourth and last spaceflight	Off station	Flight engineer		
SpaceX Crew-11	Kimiya Yui, JAXA; Second spaceflight	Off station	Flight engineer		
SpaceX Crew-11	Oleg Platonov, Roscosmos; First spaceflight	Off station	Flight engineer		
Soyuz MS-28	Sergey Kud-Sverchkov, Roscosmos; Second spaceflight	Off station			Flight engineer
Soyuz MS-28	Sergey Mikayev, Roscosmos; First spaceflight	Off station			Flight engineer
Soyuz MS-28	Christopher Williams, NASA; First spaceflight	Off station			Flight engineer

== Vehicle manifest ==
Vehicle	Purpose	Port	Docking date	Undocking date
Vehicles inherited from Expedition 72
Progress MS-29	Cargo	Poisk zenith	23 Nov 2024	1 Jul 2025
Progress MS-30	Cargo	Zvezda aft	1 Mar 2025	9 Sep 2025
SpaceX Crew-10 "Endurance"	Exp. 72/73 crew	Harmony forward	16 Mar 2025	8 Aug 2025
Soyuz MS-27 "Favor"	Exp. 72/73 crew	Prichal nadir	8 Apr 2025	9 Dec 2025
Vehicles docked during Expedition 73
CRS SpX-32	Cargo	Harmony zenith	22 Apr 2025	23 May 2025
Ax-4 "Grace"	Visiting commercial mission	Harmony zenith	26 Jun 2025	14 Jul 2025
Progress MS-31	Cargo	Poisk zenith	5 Jul 2025	16 Mar 2026 (Exp. 74)
SpaceX Crew-11 "Endeavour"	Exp. 73/74 crew	Harmony zenith	2 Aug 2025	14 Jan 2026 (Exp. 74)
CRS SpX-33	Cargo	Harmony forward	25 Aug 2025	26 Feb 2026 (Exp. 74)
Progress MS-32	Cargo	Zvezda aft	13 Sep 2025	20 Apr 2026 (Exp. 74)
CRS NG-23	Cargo	Unity nadir	18 Sep 2025	24 Nov 2025
CRS NG-23	Cargo	Unity nadir	1 Dec 2025 (reberth)	12 Mar 2026 (Exp. 74)
HTV-X1	Cargo	Harmony nadir	29 Oct 2025	6 Mar 2026 (Exp. 74)
Soyuz MS-28 "Gyrfalcon"	Exp. 73/74 crew	Rassvet nadir	27 Nov 2025	26 Jul 2026 (Exp. 74)

Segment	US Orbital Segment				Russian Orbital Segment			
Period	Harmony forward	Harmony zenith	Harmony nadir	Unity nadir	Rassvet nadir	Prichal nadir	Poisk zenith	Zvezda aft
19–22 Apr 2025	SpaceX Crew-10	Vacant	Vacant	Vacant	Vacant	Soyuz MS-27	Progress MS-29	Progress MS-30
22 Apr–23 May 2025	SpaceX Crew-10	CRS SpX-32	Vacant	Vacant	Vacant	Soyuz MS-27	Progress MS-29	Progress MS-30
23 May–26 Jun 2025	SpaceX Crew-10	Vacant	Vacant	Vacant	Vacant	Soyuz MS-27	Progress MS-29	Progress MS-30
26 Jun–1 Jul 2025	SpaceX Crew-10	Ax-4	Vacant	Vacant	Vacant	Soyuz MS-27	Progress MS-29	Progress MS-30
1–5 Jul 2025	SpaceX Crew-10	Ax-4	Vacant	Vacant	Vacant	Soyuz MS-27	Vacant	Progress MS-30
5–14 Jul 2025	SpaceX Crew-10	Ax-4	Vacant	Vacant	Vacant	Soyuz MS-27	Progress MS-31	Progress MS-30
14 Jul–2 Aug 2025	SpaceX Crew-10	Vacant	Vacant	Vacant	Vacant	Soyuz MS-27	Progress MS-31	Progress MS-30
2–8 Aug 2025	SpaceX Crew-10	SpaceX Crew-11	Vacant	Vacant	Vacant	Soyuz MS-27	Progress MS-31	Progress MS-30
8–25 Aug 2025	Vacant	SpaceX Crew-11	Vacant	Vacant	Vacant	Soyuz MS-27	Progress MS-31	Progress MS-30
25 Aug–9 Sep 2025	CRS SpX-33	SpaceX Crew-11	Vacant	Vacant	Vacant	Soyuz MS-27	Progress MS-31	Progress MS-30
9–13 Sep 2025	CRS SpX-33	SpaceX Crew-11	Vacant	Vacant	Vacant	Soyuz MS-27	Progress MS-31	Vacant
13–18 Sep 2025	CRS SpX-33	SpaceX Crew-11	Vacant	Vacant	Vacant	Soyuz MS-27	Progress MS-31	Progress MS-32
18 Sep–29 Oct 2025	CRS SpX-33	SpaceX Crew-11	Vacant	CRS NG‑23	Vacant	Soyuz MS-27	Progress MS-31	Progress MS-32
29 Oct–24 Nov 2025	CRS SpX-33	SpaceX Crew-11	HTV-X1	CRS NG‑23	Vacant	Soyuz MS-27	Progress MS-31	Progress MS-32
24–27 Nov 2025	CRS SpX-33	SpaceX Crew-11	HTV-X1	Vacant	Vacant	Soyuz MS-27	Progress MS-31	Progress MS-32
27 Nov–1 Dec 2025	CRS SpX-33	SpaceX Crew-11	HTV-X1	Vacant	Soyuz MS-28	Soyuz MS-27	Progress MS-31	Progress MS-32
1–9 Dec 2025	CRS SpX-33	SpaceX Crew-11	HTV-X1	CRS NG‑23	Soyuz MS-28	Soyuz MS-27	Progress MS-31	Progress MS-32

The Prichal aft, forward, starboard, and aft ports all have yet to be used since the module originally docked to the station and are not included in the table.
