= Cygnus NG-23 =

Summer 2025 cargo mission to the ISS

NG-23
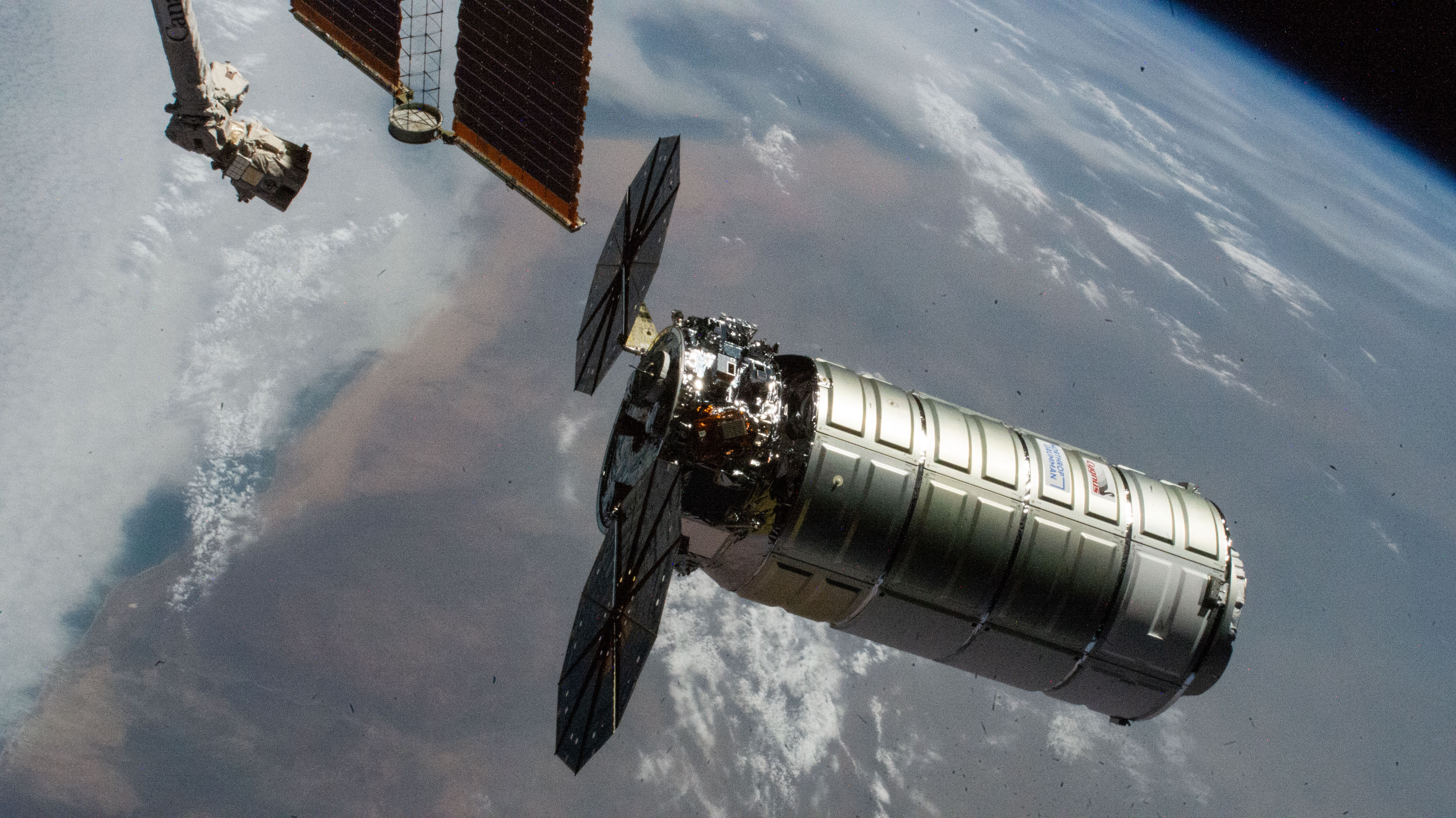
- NG-23 shortly before it was captured by the Canadarm2
- Names: CRS NG-23
- Mission type: ISS resupply
- Operator: Northrop Grumman
- COSPAR ID: 2025-208A
- SATCAT no.: 65616
- Mission duration: 180 days, 1 hour and 48 minutes

Spacecraft properties
- Spacecraft: S.S. William "Willie" C. McCool
- Spacecraft type: Cygnus XL
- Manufacturer: Northrop Grumman; Thales Alenia Space
- Launch mass: 10,200 kg (22,500 lb)

Start of mission
- Launch date: September 14, 2025, 22:11:49 UTC (6:11:49 pm EDT)
- Rocket: Falcon 9 Block 5 (B1094‑4)
- Launch site: Cape Canaveral, SLC‑40
- Contractor: SpaceX

End of mission
- Disposal: Deorbited
- Decay date: March 14, 2026

Orbital parameters
- Reference system: Geocentric orbit
- Regime: Low Earth orbit
- Inclination: 51.66°

Berthing at ISS
- Berthing port: Unity nadir
- RMS capture: September 18, 2025, 11:24 UTC
- Berthing date: September 18, 2025, 14:10 UTC
- Unberthing date: November 24, 2025
- Time berthed: 66 days, 9 hours and 50 minutes

Reberthing with ISS
- Reberthing port: Unity nadir
- Reberthing date: December 1, 2025
- Unreberthing date: March 12, 2026, 04:00 UTC
- RMS release: March 12, 2026, 11:06 UTC
- Time reberthed: 101 days and 4 hours

Cargo
- Mass: 4,911 kg (10,827 lb)
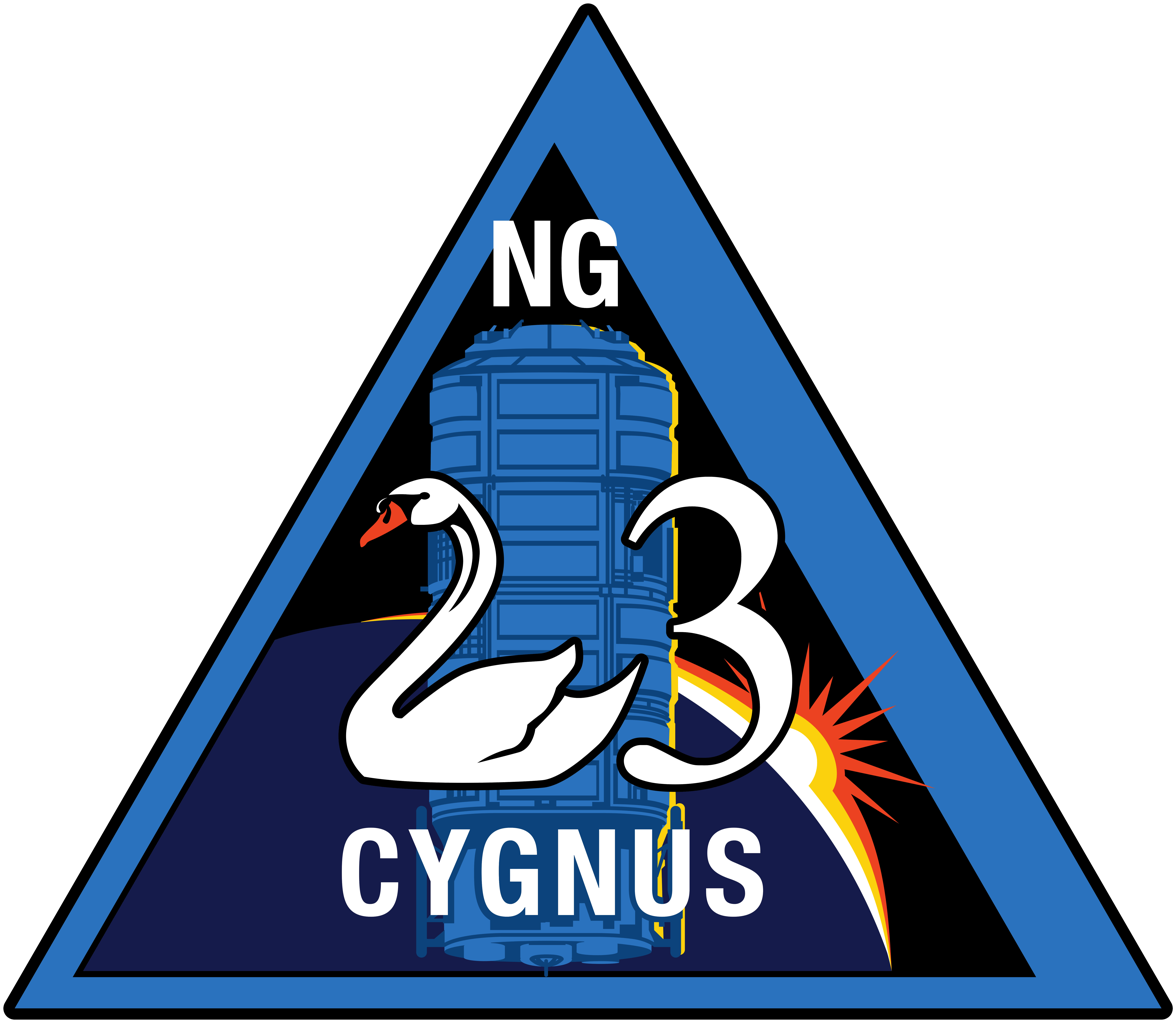
- Mission patch Commercial Resupply Services Cygnus flights

NG-23 was a cargo resupply mission to the International Space Station (ISS) under NASA's Commercial Resupply Services (CRS) contract. Operated by Northrop Grumman, the flight successfully launched on September 14, 2025, aboard a Falcon 9 Block 5 rocket. The spacecraft is named S.S. William "Willie" C. McCool in honor of the NASA astronaut who died in the Space Shuttle Columbia disaster in 2003.

The mission debuted the Cygnus XL spacecraft configuration, featuring a pressurized cargo module measuring 7.89 meters (25.9 ft) in length, with a payload capacity of 5,000 kilograms (11,000 lb), an increase of 19.5%, and a pressurized cargo volume of 36 cubic metres (1,300 cu ft), an increase of 15.5%.

It is the third Cygnus launch on a Falcon 9, arranged after Northrop Grumman's Antares 230+ was retired in 2023 due to supply chain disruptions stemming from the Russian invasion of Ukraine. A successor, the Antares 300, is under development with no Russian or Ukrainian components.

== Background ==
The Cygnus cargo spacecraft was developed by Orbital Sciences Corporation with partial funding from NASA's Commercial Orbital Transportation Services (COTS) program. It pairs a pressurized cargo module built by Thales Alenia Space—derived from the Multi-Purpose Logistics Module used on the Space Shuttle—with a service module based on Orbital's GEOStar satellite bus.

The first Standard Cygnus flew in 2013, followed by the larger Enhanced Cygnus in 2015. Orbital Sciences became Orbital ATK in 2015 and was acquired by Northrop Grumman in 2018. Since then, Northrop Grumman has continued CRS operations. NG-23 is the eleventh Cygnus mission under the CRS-2 contract.

== Mission ==
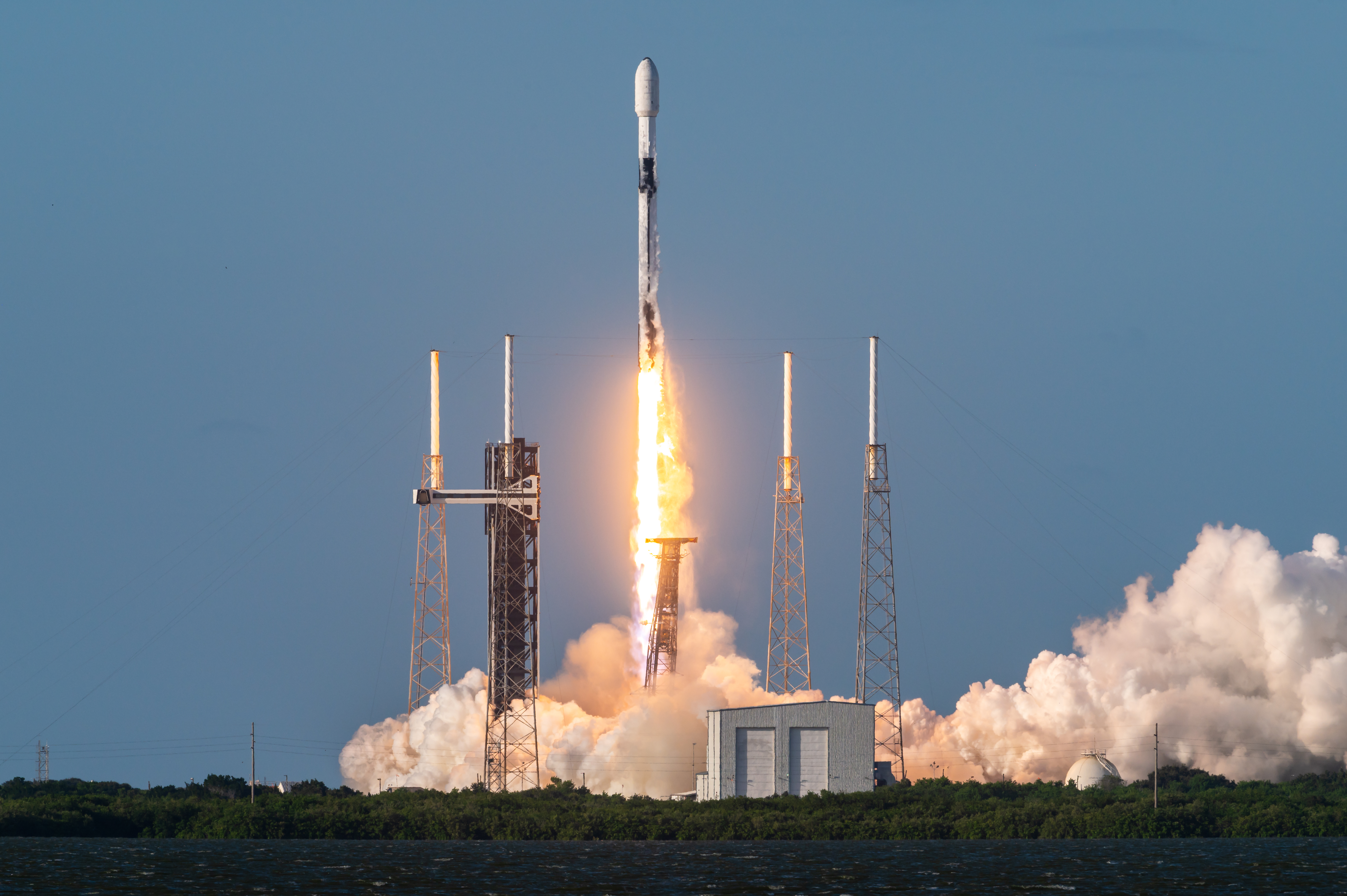
Launch of Cygnus NG-23

The Pressurized Cargo Module (PCM) was manufactured by Thales Alenia Space in Turin, Italy and assembly of the service module for the NG-23 spacecraft took place at Northrop Grumman's facility in Dulles, Virginia. The service module was integrated with the pressurized cargo module at the Space Systems Processing Facility at the Kennedy Space Center.

The flight marks the first launch of the Cygnus XL configuration, designed to increase cargo capacity and volume for future Commercial Resupply Services (CRS) missions. NASA and Northrop Grumman conducted additional certification work to assess the thermal and life-support impacts of the larger design, as well as to evaluate how the Canadarm2 could best accommodate the heavier and longer vehicle.

NG-23 lifted off on September 14, 2025, at 22:11:49 UTC (6:11:49 pm EDT) aboard a Falcon 9 Block 5 rocket from Space Launch Complex 40 at the Cape Canaveral Space Force Station. After reaching orbit, the Cygnus XL spacecraft began its planned engine burns to rendezvous with the International Space Station, but two burns shut down early due to a conservative software safeguard. NASA postponed the September 17 docking while engineers worked on an alternate plan, keeping Cygnus at a safe distance. On September 18, astronaut Jonny Kim, with help from Zena Cardman, captured the spacecraft using Canadarm2 at 11:24 UTC. Ground teams at Northrop Grumman's control center in Dulles and NASA's Johnson Space Center in Houston, Texas completed berthing a few hours later.

The spacecraft was unberthed on 24 November 2025 and held on Canadarm2 away from the docking port, as its position would otherwise interfere with the approach corridor for Soyuz MS-28 at the Rassvet nadir docking port. If this maneuver was not possible to be carried out, NG-23 would have been required to depart in November.

Following the reberthing of NG-23 to Unity module on 1 December 2025, for the first time, all eight International Space Station docking ports were occupied. The space station currently hosts: SpaceX Dragon 2s (Crew-11 and CRS-33), Northrop Grumman's Cygnus XL (NG-23), JAXA’s HTV-X1, Roscosmos' Soyuz MS (MS-27 and MS-28), Progress MS (MS-31 and MS-32) spacecraft. NG-23 remained at the station until March 12, 2026.

The Cygnus XL is equipped with "Extend the Lab" capabilities, allowing experiments to be conducted within the spacecraft by delivering power to the experiments, enabling science to take place without unloading them. Cygnus is also capable of performing ISS reboosts if requested by NASA. After unberthing, but before its controlled destructive reentry, the Cygnus XL will conduct a secondary mission to test the PALOMINO electrospray thruster subsystem developed by Revolution Space.

== Manifest changes ==
NG-23 was advanced in the launch schedule by four months after the indefinite delay of Cygnus NG-22, whose pressurized cargo module was damaged during transportation to the launch site in early 2025. Following inspections, NASA and Northrop Grumman replaced NG-22 with the next available vehicle, NG-23, which launched in September 2025.

== See also ==
- Uncrewed spaceflights to the International Space Station
