= Anne McClain =

United States Army officer and astronaut

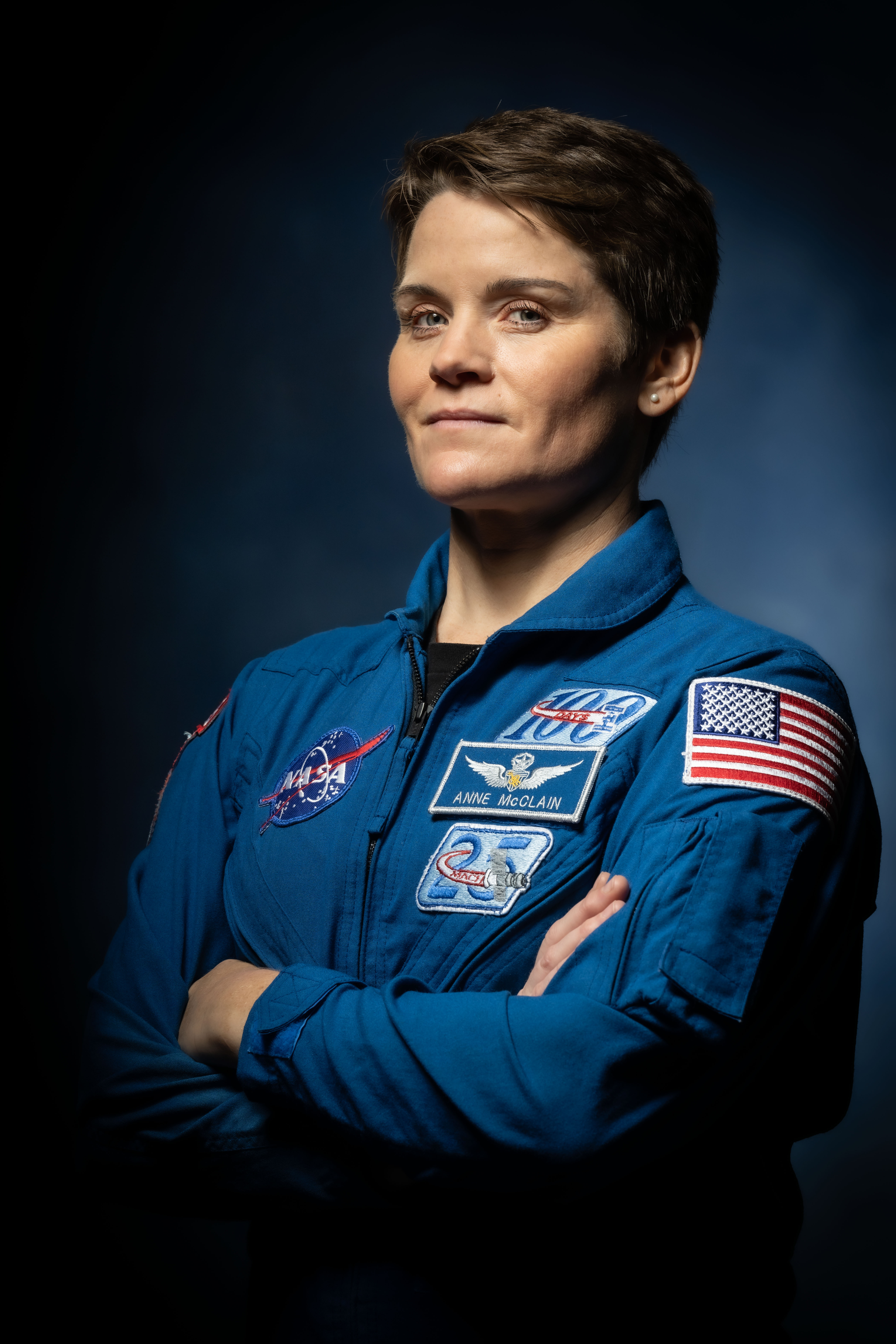
- McClain in 2024
- Born: Anne Charlotte McClain; June 7, 1979 (age 47); Spokane, Washington, U.S.
- Education: United States Military Academy (BS); University of Bath (MS); University of Bristol (MA)
- Spouse: Summer Worden (m. 2014; div. 2019)
- Awards: Defense Superior Service Medal
- Space career

NASA astronaut
- Rank: Colonel, US Army
- Time in space: 351 days, 7 hours and 45 minutes
- Selection: NASA Group 21 (2013)
- Total EVAs: 3
- Total EVA time: 18 hours, 52 minutes
- Missions: Soyuz MS-11 (Expedition 57/58/59); SpaceX Crew-10 (Expedition 72/73)
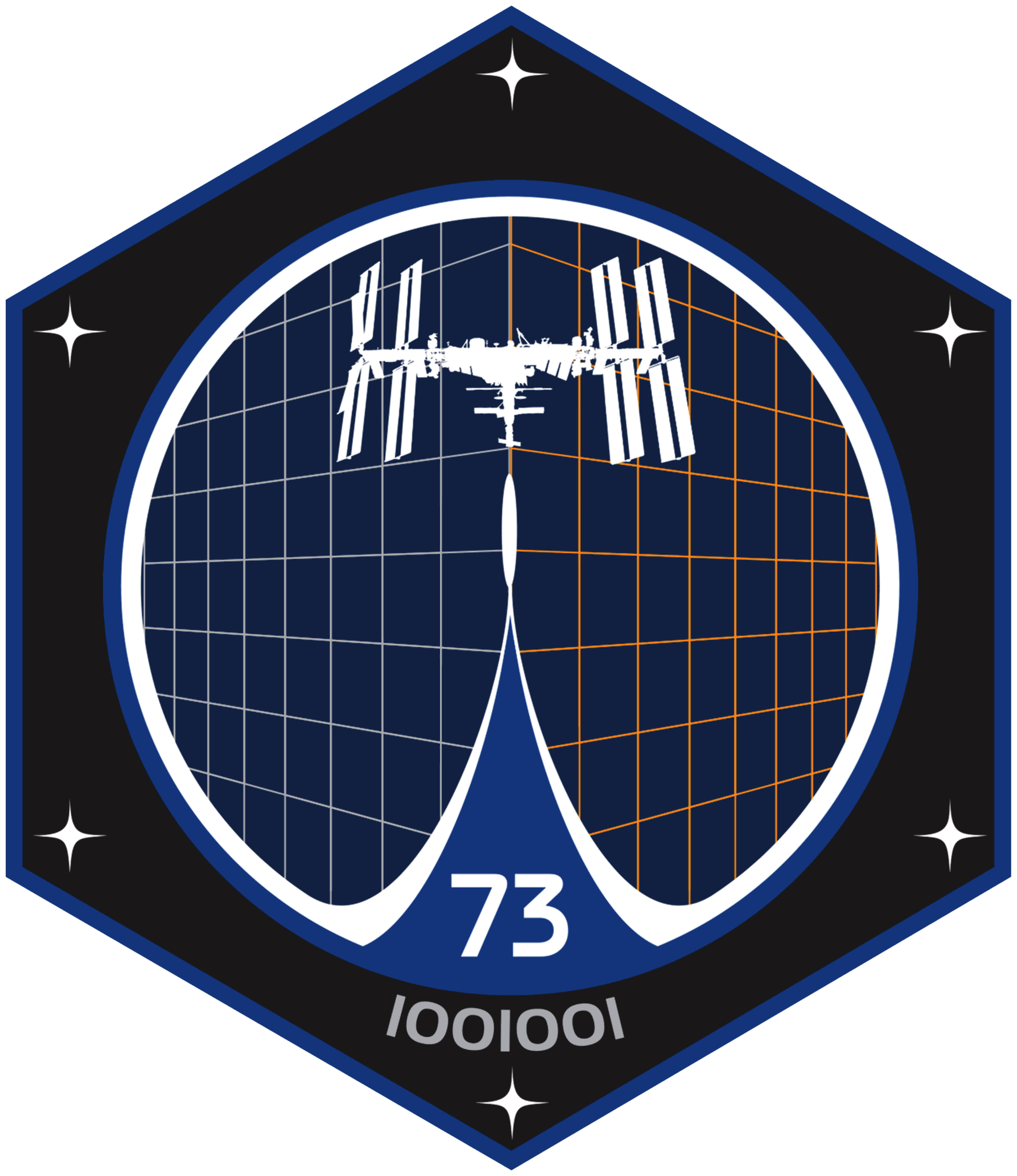
- Mission insignia

Anne Charlotte McClain (born June 7, 1979) is a colonel in the United States Army, engineer, and a NASA astronaut. Her call sign, "Annimal", dates back to her rugby career; she also uses the call sign in her X handle, AstroAnnimal. She was a flight engineer for Expedition 57/58/59 and Expedition 72/73 to the International Space Station.

== Education ==
Born and raised in Spokane, Washington, McClain wanted to become an astronaut at a young age. In 1997, McClain graduated from Gonzaga Preparatory School in Spokane. She did a brief stint at Spokane Community College where she played softball and enrolled in R.O.T.C. at Gonzaga University, waiting on an appointment to the United States Military Academy, West Point, where she earned a bachelor's degree in mechanical engineering and was commissioned as an army officer in 2002. She then attended the University of Bath, where she earned a master's degree in aerospace engineering in 2004, and the University of Bristol, where she earned a master's degree in international relations in 2005. Both master's degrees were completed through a Marshall Scholarship. Her work on unsteady aerodynamics and flow visualization of free-to-roll non-slender delta wings was later published through the American Institute of Aeronautics and Astronautics.

McClain traveled to Africa for eight weeks with Operation Crossroads Africa, working on a construction project in Uganda.

== Competitive sports ==
McClain is an avid rugby player who began playing the sport at Gonzaga University and the United States Military Academy. She played for Clifton Rugby Football Club in the Women's Premiership, the top level of the sport in England, as well as for domestic club teams including the Atlanta Harlequins and Seattle Rugby Club. She earned her first cap for the United States women's national rugby union team, known as the Women's Eagles, in 2004 and went on to captain and coach USA Rugby South. While her U.S. Army commitments thwarted her international career in rugby and prevented her participation in the 2006 Women's Rugby World Cup, she participated at that level for a decade interrupted only by her deployment to Iraq, and credits the sport for her success in becoming an astronaut.

According to an interview published on the NASA Johnson YouTube channel, McClain said that the rugby training was helpful when training with a space suit in a neutral buoyancy pool.

== Military career ==
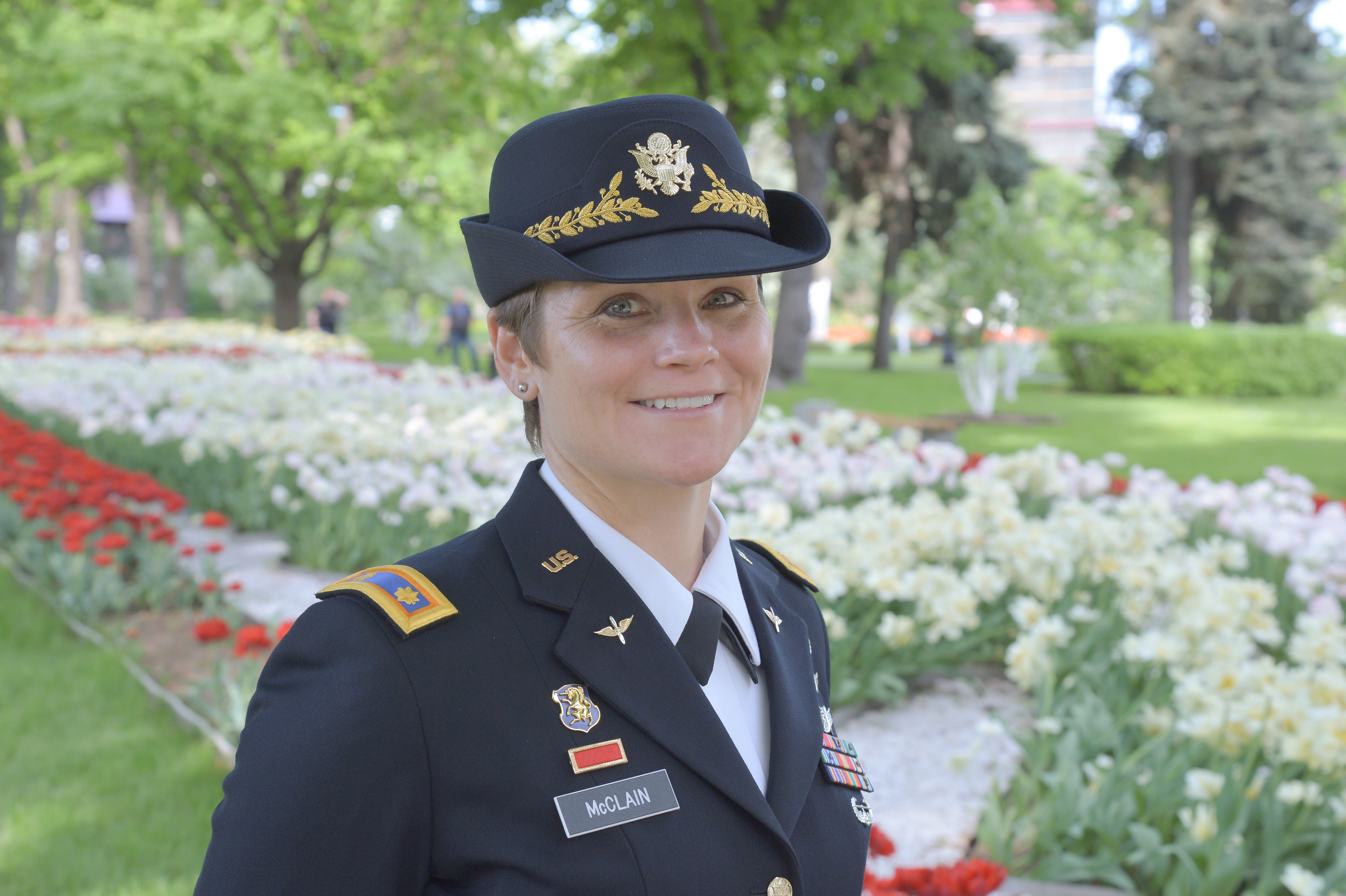
McClain in Army Service Uniform in 2018

Following her studies, McClain qualified as a Bell OH-58 Kiowa Warrior helicopter pilot. She was deployed to the 2nd Battalion, 6th Cavalry Regiment at Wheeler Army Airfield, Hawaii. McClain rose through the ranks, starting as an Air Traffic Control Platoon Leader, Aviation Intermediate Maintenance Platoon Leader, to Detachment Commander.

McClain was deployed to the Persian Gulf and flew 800 hours and 216 combat missions during the 15 months deployment as part of Operation Iraqi Freedom.

In 2009, McClain participated in Aviation Captain's Career Course and was then assigned to 1st Battalion, 14th Aviation Regiment at Fort Rucker as the battalion operations officer and OH-58D instructor. In May 2010, she was appointed Commander of C Troop, 1st Battalion, 14th Aviation Regiment, responsible for the Army's initial entry training, instructor pilot training, and maintenance test pilot training in the OH-58D Kiowa Warrior. She completed Command and General Staff College and the C-12 fixed wing multiengine qualification courses in 2011 and 2012.

She also served as a command squadron intelligence officer. McClain graduated from the Naval Test Pilot School in June 2013. In total, McClain has logged over 2,000 hours on various aircraft type including the Kiowa Warrior, the Beechcraft C-12 Huron, the Sikorsky UH-60 Black Hawk, and the Eurocopter UH-72 Lakota.

== NASA career ==
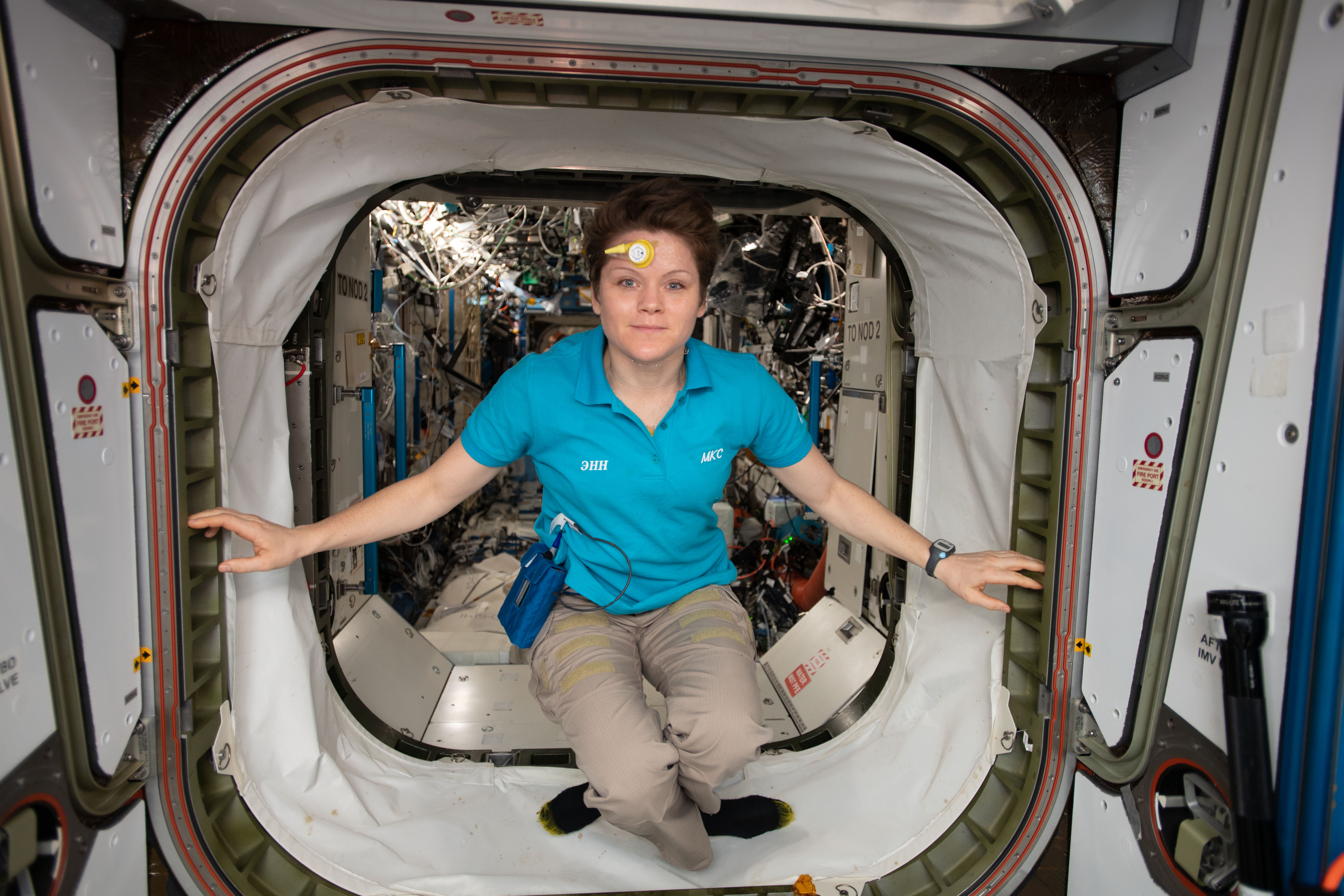
McClain inside the vestibule between the Harmony and Destiny modules, wearing a sensor on her forehead collecting data on how the circadian rhythm is affected by long spaceflight

In June 2013, the same month as her graduation as a test pilot, McClain was selected by NASA as part of Astronaut Group 21 at 34 years old. She completed training in July 2015, making her available for future missions. She flew to the International Space Station in December 2018 and returned to Earth in June 2019. On December 9, 2020, McClain was announced as one of NASA's Artemis astronauts.

=== Expedition 57/58/59 ===
For her first spaceflight assignment, McClain was assigned to as flight engineer to ISS Expedition 60/61, scheduled for launch aboard Soyuz MS-13 in June–July 2019, although in January 2018, NASA astronaut Jeanette Epps was removed from the prime crew of Expedition 56/57, resulting in her backup, Serena Aunon-Chancellor taking her place on the flight. Due to this, McClain was moved up to take Aunon-Chancellor's spot on the Expedition 56/57 backup crew, and, in turn, was assigned to the prime crew of Expedition 58/59, alongside Russian cosmonaut Oleg Kononenko and Canadian astronaut David Saint-Jacques.

The Expedition 58/59 trio launched aboard Soyuz MS-11 to the International Space Station at 06:32 ET (11:32 GMT) on December 3, 2018, from the Cosmodrome in Baikonur, Kazakhstan. The launch was originally scheduled for December 20, 2018, but was rescheduled to the earlier date after the failure of Soyuz MS-10 with Expedition 57/58 on October 11, 2018. The crew successfully rendezvoused with the ISS six hours later, spending just over two weeks with the Expedition 57 crew, whose landing had been delayed due to the aborted launch of MS-10.

On March 22, 2019, McClain and Nick Hague performed their first spacewalk to install the adapter plates while Dextre swaps the batteries between spacewalks. The extravehicular activity (EVA) lasted 6 hours and 39 minutes. They also removed debris from the Unity module in preparation for the arrival of Cygnus NG-11 in April, stowing tools for the repair of the flex hose rotary coupler, and securing tiebacks on the solar array blanket boxes.

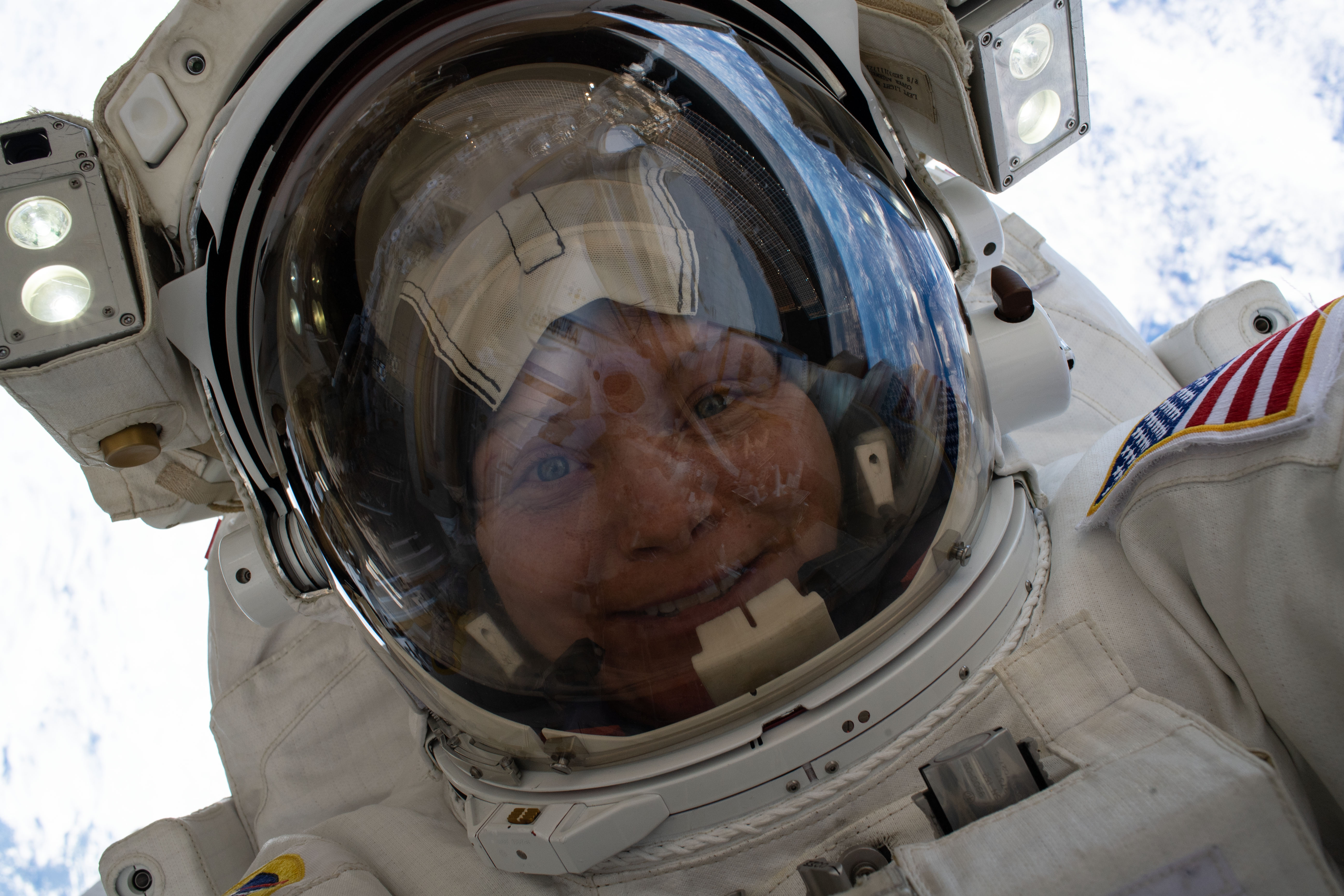
McClain takes a selfie during her first spacewalk, Expedition 59 EVA 1, on March 22, 2019.

McClain was scheduled to perform a second EVA on March 29, with Christina Koch, which would have been the first all-female spacewalk, but spacesuit sizing issues resulted in this EVA's being reassigned to Hague and Koch. McClain conducted a second spacewalk with Saint-Jacques on April 8.

McClain, Saint-Jacques, and Kononenko returned to Earth on board Soyuz MS-11 on June 24, 2019.

=== Expedition 72/73 ===
McClain was selected as commander for the SpaceX Crew-10 mission to the International Space Station alongside pilot Nichole Ayers and mission specialists Takuya Onishi and Kirill Peskov. The flight was launched on 14 March 2025.

== Awards ==
McClain is a recipient of the Defense Superior Service Medal, the Legion of Merit, Bronze Star Medal, the Air Medal with Valor device, two additional Air Medals, two Army Commendation Medals, two Army Achievement Medals, the Iraq Campaign Medal with two service stars, the Global War on Terrorism Service Medal, and three Overseas Service Ribbons. She has also received an honorary Doctorate in Engineering from the University of Bath.

== Personal life ==
McClain married Summer Worden, a former United States Air Force intelligence officer, in 2014 and became stepmother to Worden's son. McClain and Worden divorced in 2019, following a dispute over parental rights.

On August 23, 2019, The New York Times reported that Worden filed a complaint against McClain through the Federal Trade Commission accusing her of illegally accessing Worden’s personal bank account while residing in the International Space Station. This accusation outed McClain as a member of the LGBTQ community, making her the third known LGBT astronaut after Sally Ride and Wendy B. Lawrence. The claims were later found to be false, and McClain was cleared. On April 7, 2020, Worden was indicted on two charges of knowingly making false statements. Worden pleaded guilty to the charges in November 2025. In February 2026, Worden was sentenced to 3 months in federal prison with 2 years of supervised release, and ordered to pay $210,000 in restitution. Worden was revealed to have doxxed McClain, resulting in threatening calls to McClain.

McClain resides in suburban Houston, Texas.

== Gallery ==
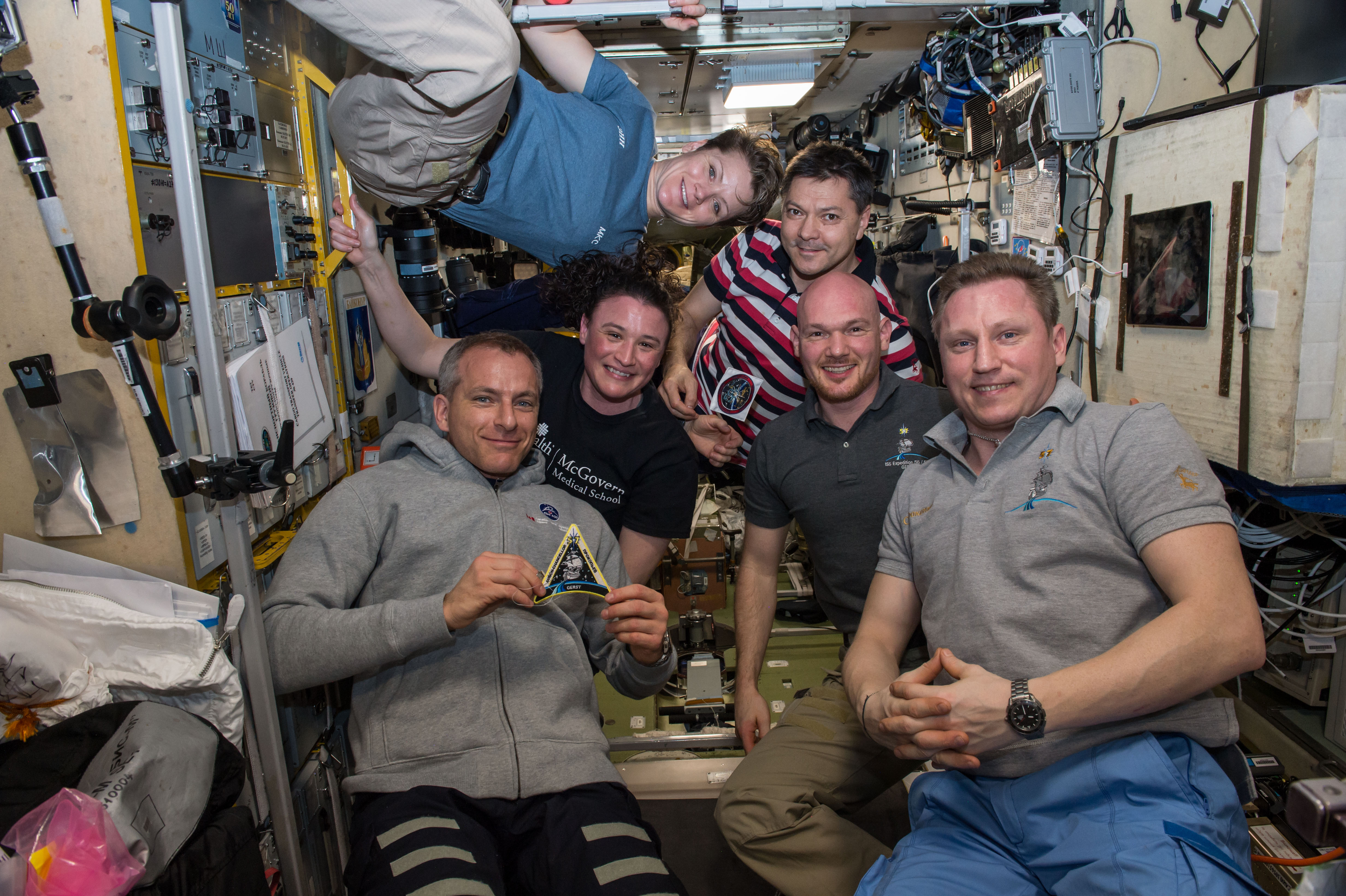
The newly expanded six-member Expedition 57 crew poses for a portrait inside the International Space Station's Zvezda service module on December 10, 2018

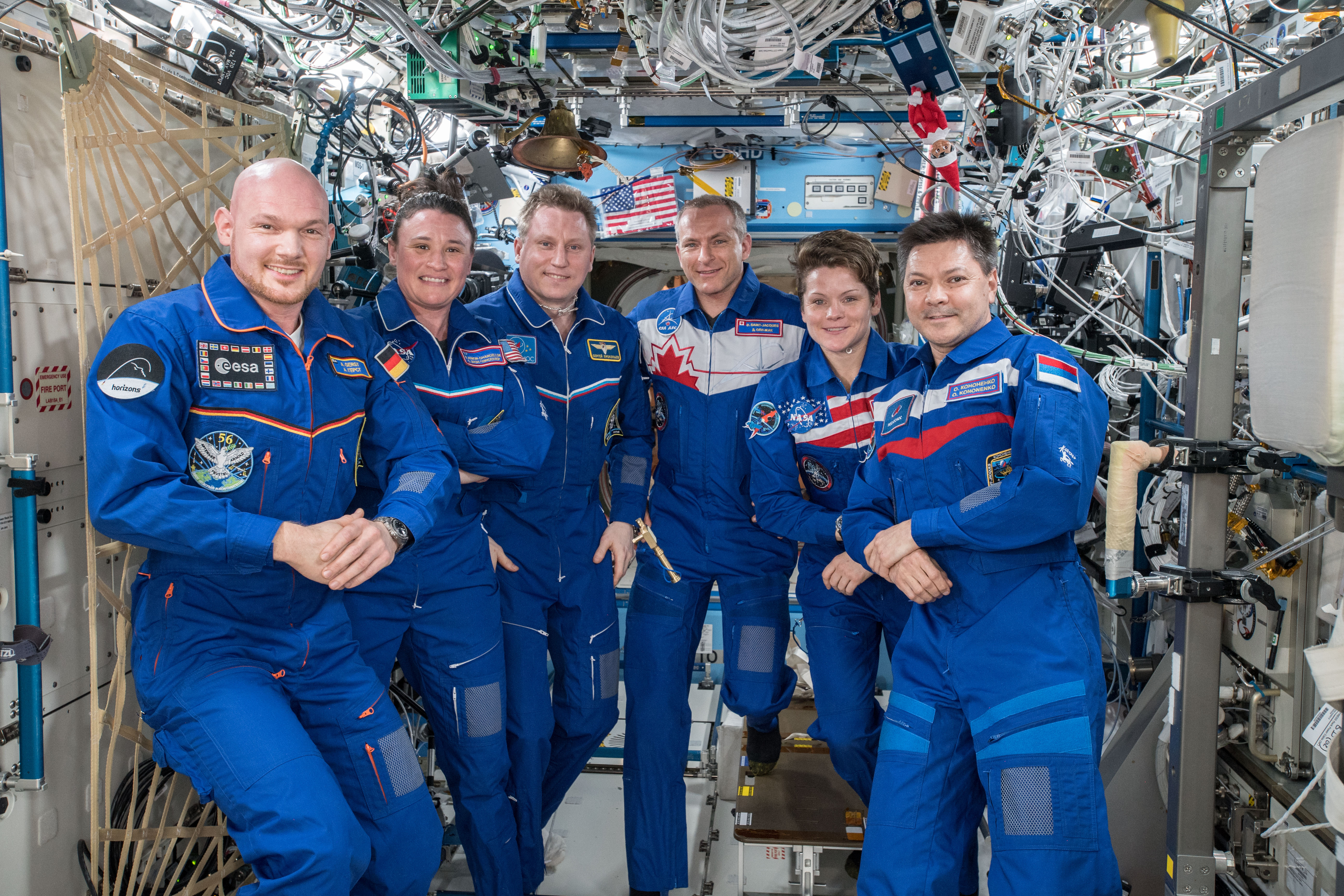
Expedition 57 crew gathers inside the Destiny laboratory on December 18, 2018

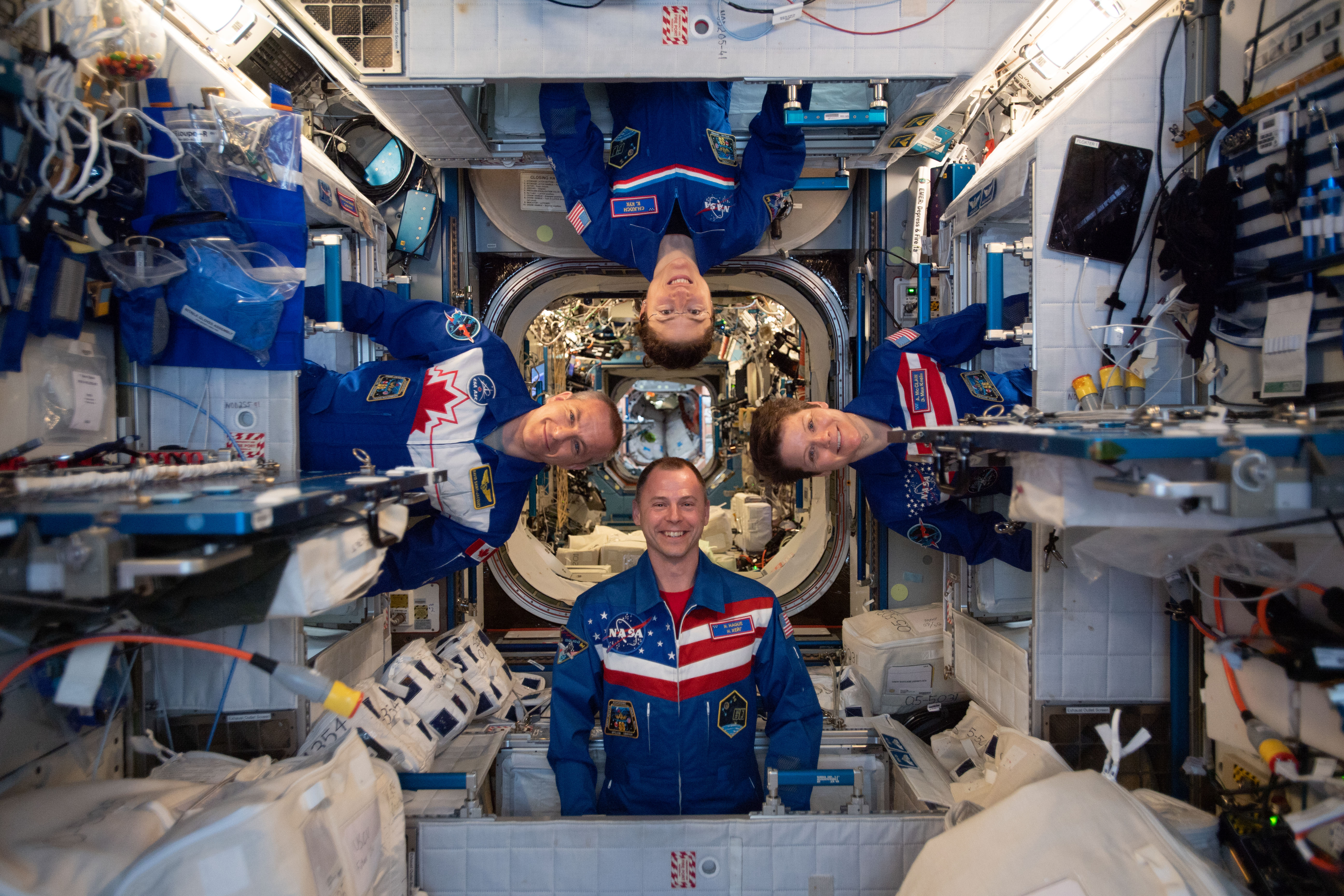
Four Expedition 59 astronauts pose for a playful portrait inside the Harmony module on May 4, 2019

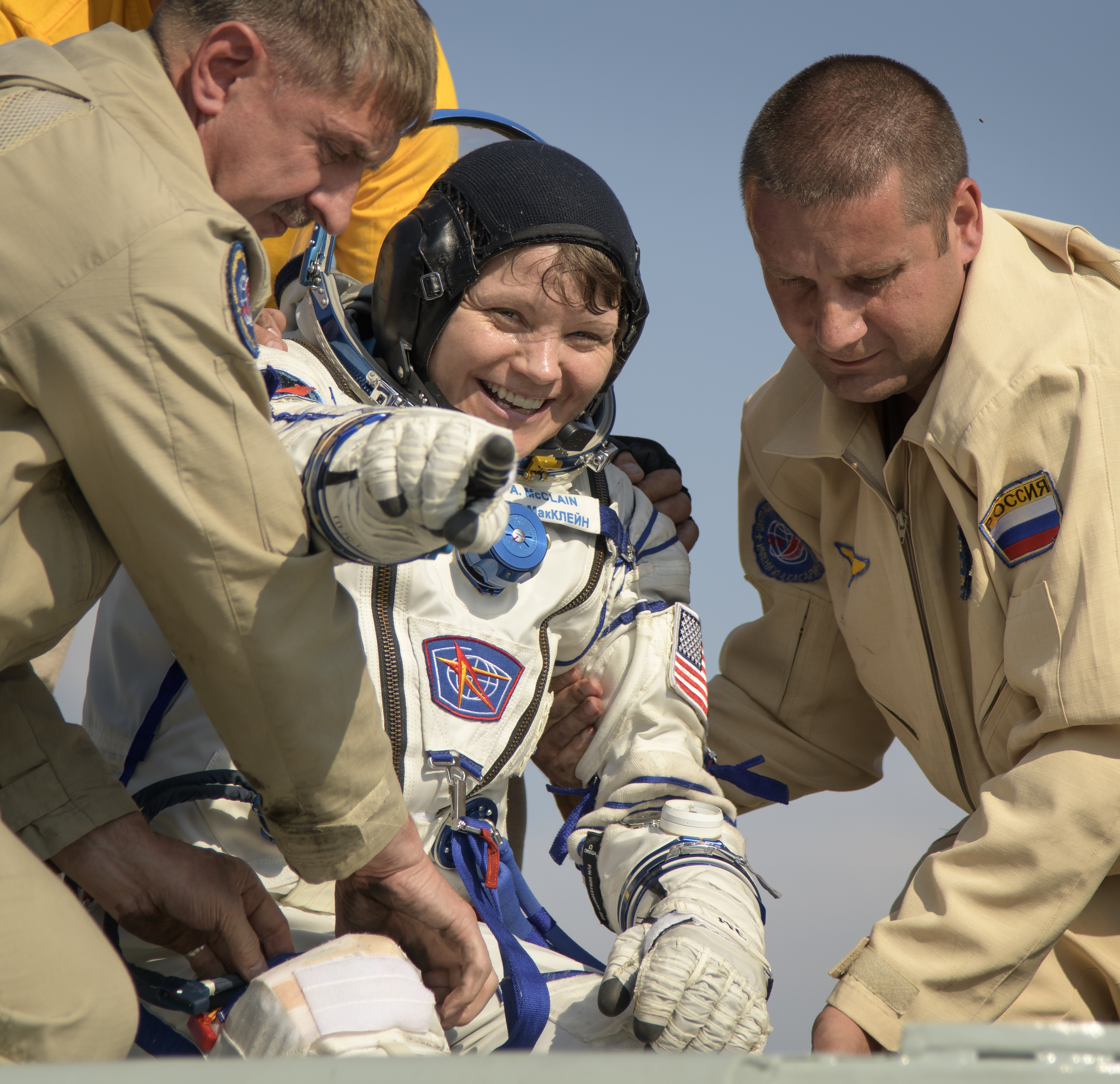
Anne McClain after her first landing near the town of Zhezkazgan on June 25, 2019

== See also ==
- List of female astronauts
- List of female explorers and travelers
- Women in science
