= Oleg Platonov (cosmonaut) =

Russian cosmonaut (born 1986)

- Олег Платонов
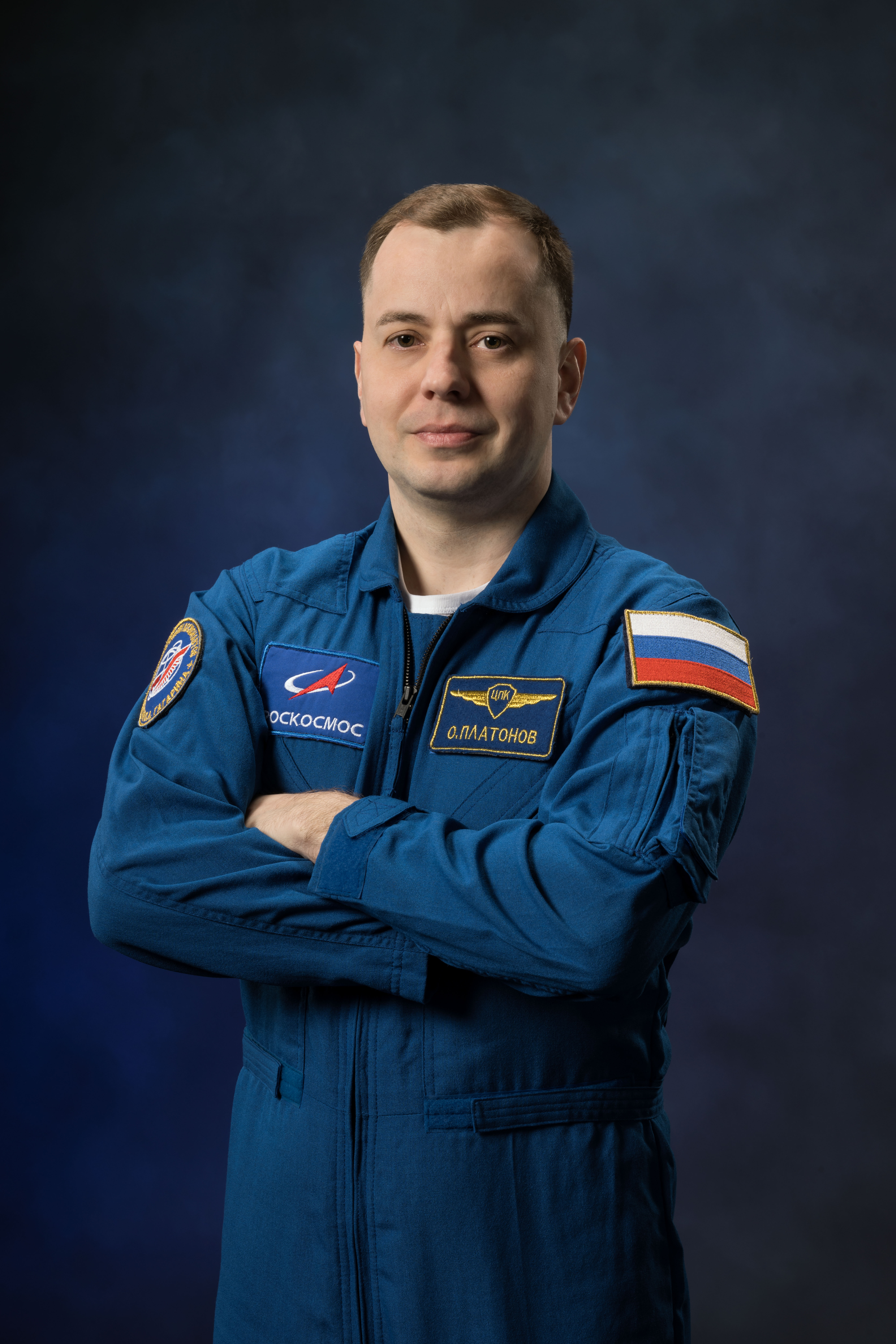
- Platonov in 2025
- Born: Oleg Vladimirovich Platonov; 27 June 1986 (age 40); Chelyabinsk, Russian SFSR, Soviet Union
- Education: Krasnodar Higher Military Aviation School of Pilots
- Space career

Roscosmos cosmonaut
- Current occupation: Test cosmonaut
- Previous occupation: Military pilot
- Status: Active
- Rank: Lieutenant colonel, Russian Air Force
- Time in space: 166 days, 16 hours and 57 minutes
- Selection: 17th Cosmonaut Group (2018)
- Missions: SpaceX Crew-11 (Expedition 73/74)
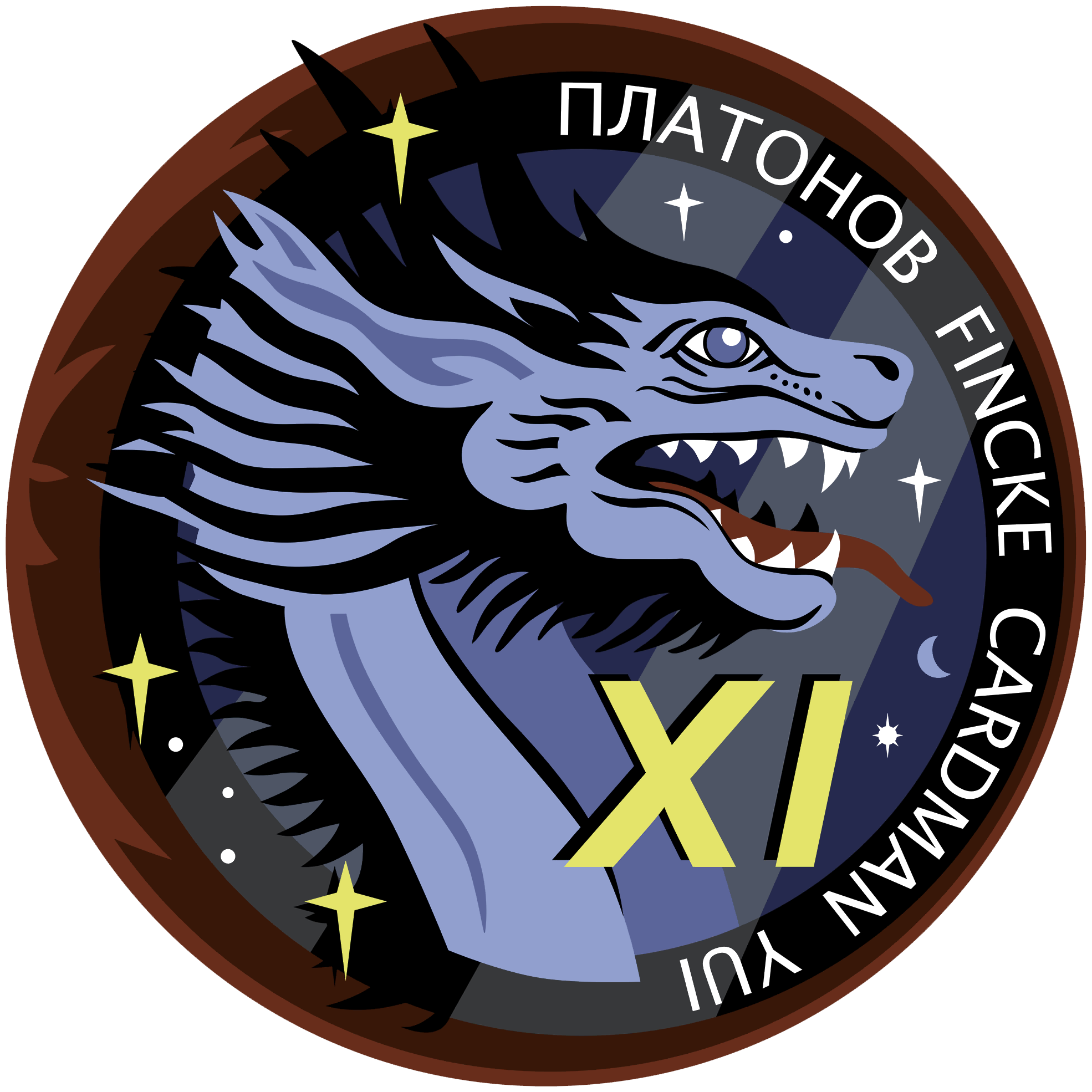
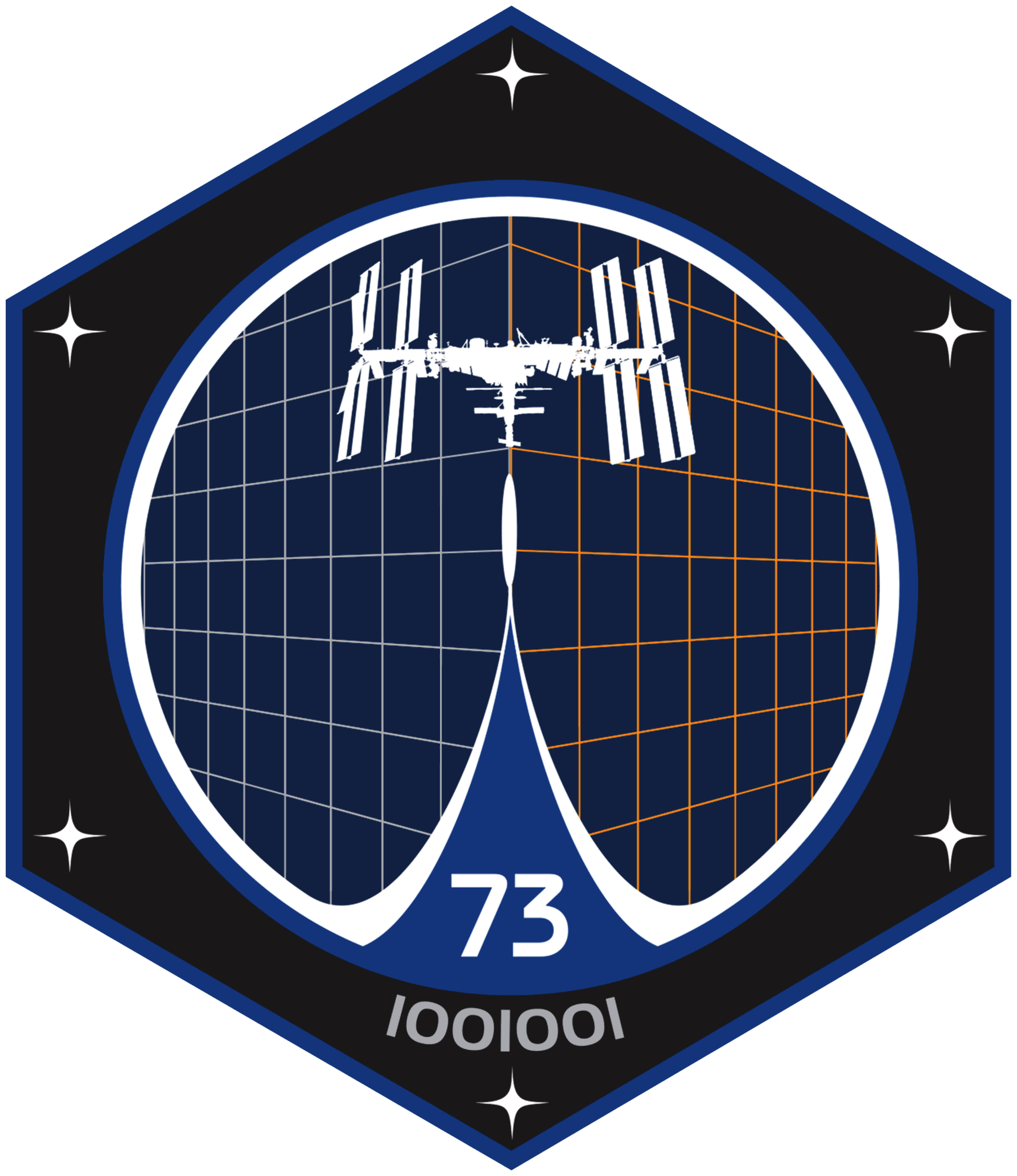
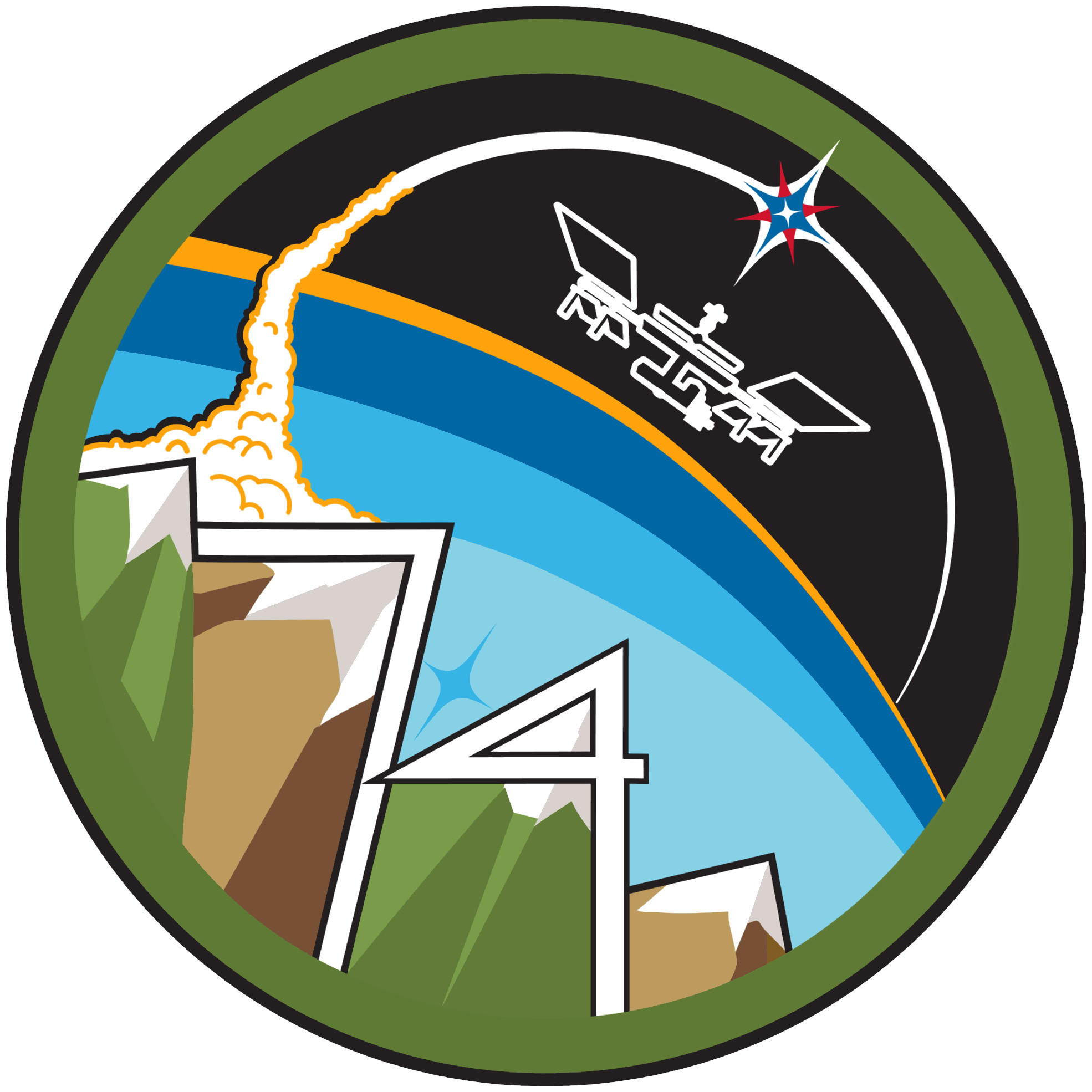
- Mission insignia

Oleg Vladimirovich Platonov (Russian: Олег Владимирович Платонов; born 27 June 1986) is a Russian cosmonaut selected by Roscosmos in 2018 as part of the Group 17 cosmonaut selection. A former military pilot and engineer, Platonov was scheduled to make his first spaceflight aboard the Soyuz MS-25 mission to the International Space Station (ISS) in 2024. This was changed to the SpaceX Crew-11 after a seat swap with a US astronaut.

== Early life and education ==
Oleg Platonov was born on 27 June 1986 in Chelyabinsk, Russian SFSR, Soviet Union (now Russia). After completing his secondary education, he enrolled at the Krasnodar Higher Military Aviation School of Pilots, specializing in "Aircraft Operation and Air Traffic Management." He graduated on 18 October 2008 with a degree in engineering and become a pilot with the Russian Air Force.

== Military career ==
Following his graduation, Platonov served in the Russian Air Force from October 2008 to November 2018. Initially stationed in Artyom, Primorsky Krai, he began as a pilot and advanced to senior pilot within an aviation unit of a fighter squadron until February 2014. That month, he was appointed commander of an aviation unit within the 22nd Guards Fighter Aviation Regiment of the Russian Aerospace Forces, achieving the rank of major.

== Cosmonaut career ==
Platonov was selected as a cosmonaut candidate by Roscosmos in 2018 as part of the Group 17 selection process. He completed his basic cosmonaut training and was officially qualified as a test cosmonaut. In February 2025, Roscosmos announced that Platonov would fly aboard a U.S. Crew Dragon spacecraft as part of the Crew-11 mission, which launched in August 2025, under a seat-swap agreement with NASA. However, he was initially assigned to the Soyuz MS-25 mission, planned for earlier in 2024, marking his first spaceflight to the ISS.

== See also ==
- List of cosmonauts
- Roscosmos Cosmonaut Corps
- Soyuz programme
