= SpaceX Crew-11 =

2025 American crewed spaceflight to the ISS

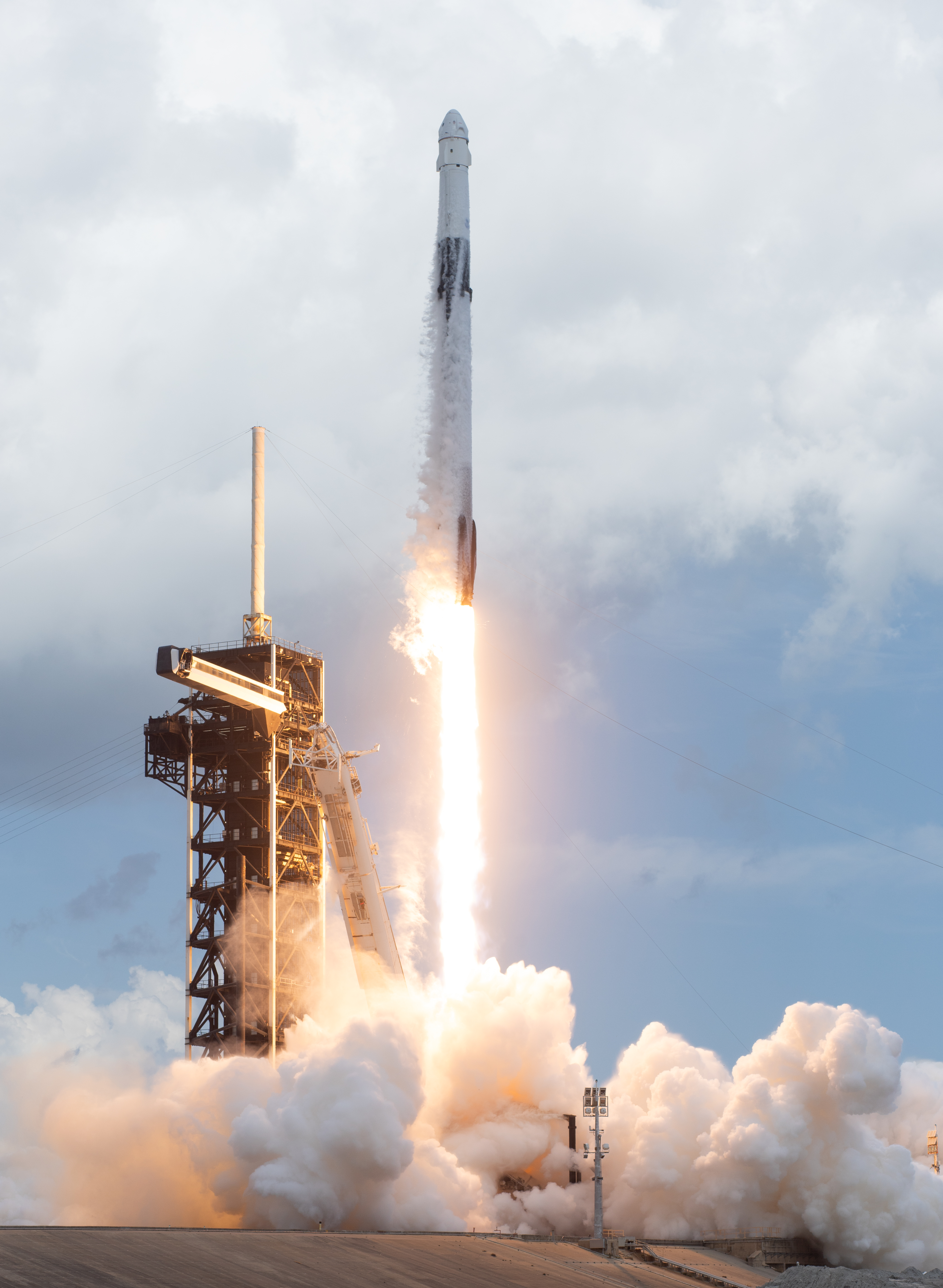
- Launch of Crew-11
- Names: USCV-11
- Mission type: ISS crew transport
- Operator: SpaceX
- COSPAR ID: 2025-166A
- SATCAT no.: 65077
- Mission duration: 166 days, 16 hours and 57 minutes

Spacecraft properties
- Spacecraft: Crew Dragon Endeavour
- Spacecraft type: Crew Dragon
- Manufacturer: SpaceX

Crew
- Crew size: 4
- Members: Zena Cardman; Michael Fincke; Kimiya Yui; Oleg Platonov
- Expedition: Expedition 73/74

Start of mission
- Launch date: August 1, 2025, 15:43:42 UTC (11:43:42 am EDT)
- Rocket: Falcon 9 Block 5 (B1094-3), Flight 512
- Launch site: Kennedy, LC‑39A

End of mission
- Recovered by: MV Shannon
- Landing date: January 15, 2026, 08:41:36 UTC (12:41:36 am PST)
- Landing site: Pacific Ocean near San Diego (32.6°N 117.7°W)

Orbital parameters
- Reference system: Geocentric orbit
- Regime: Low Earth orbit
- Perigee altitude: 192 km (119 mi)
- Apogee altitude: 214 km (133 mi)
- Inclination: 51.65°

Docking with ISS
- Docking port: Harmony zenith
- Docking date: August 2, 2025, 06:26:56 UTC
- Undocking date: January 14, 2026, 22:20 UTC
- Time docked: 165 days, 15 hours and 53 minutes
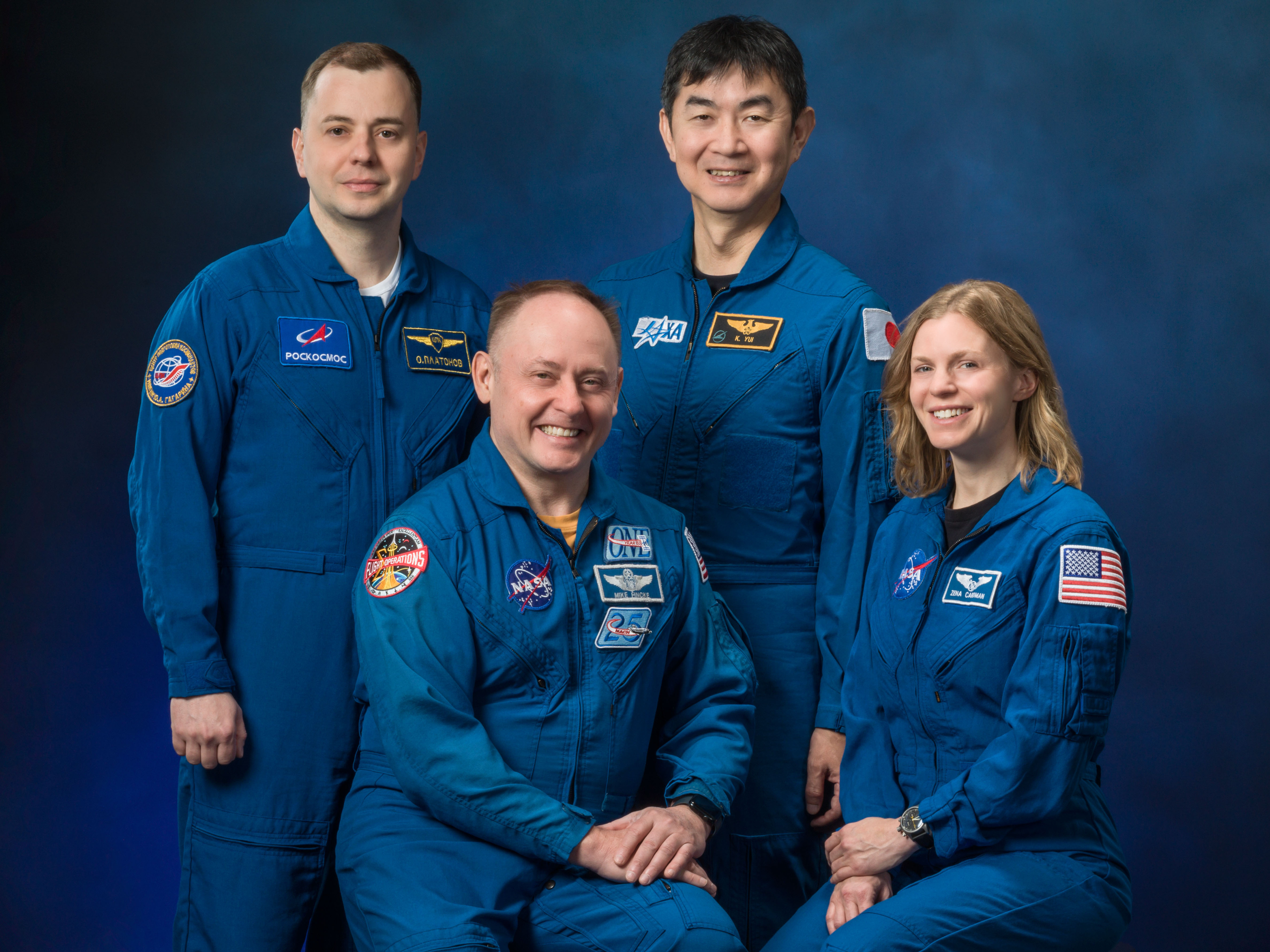
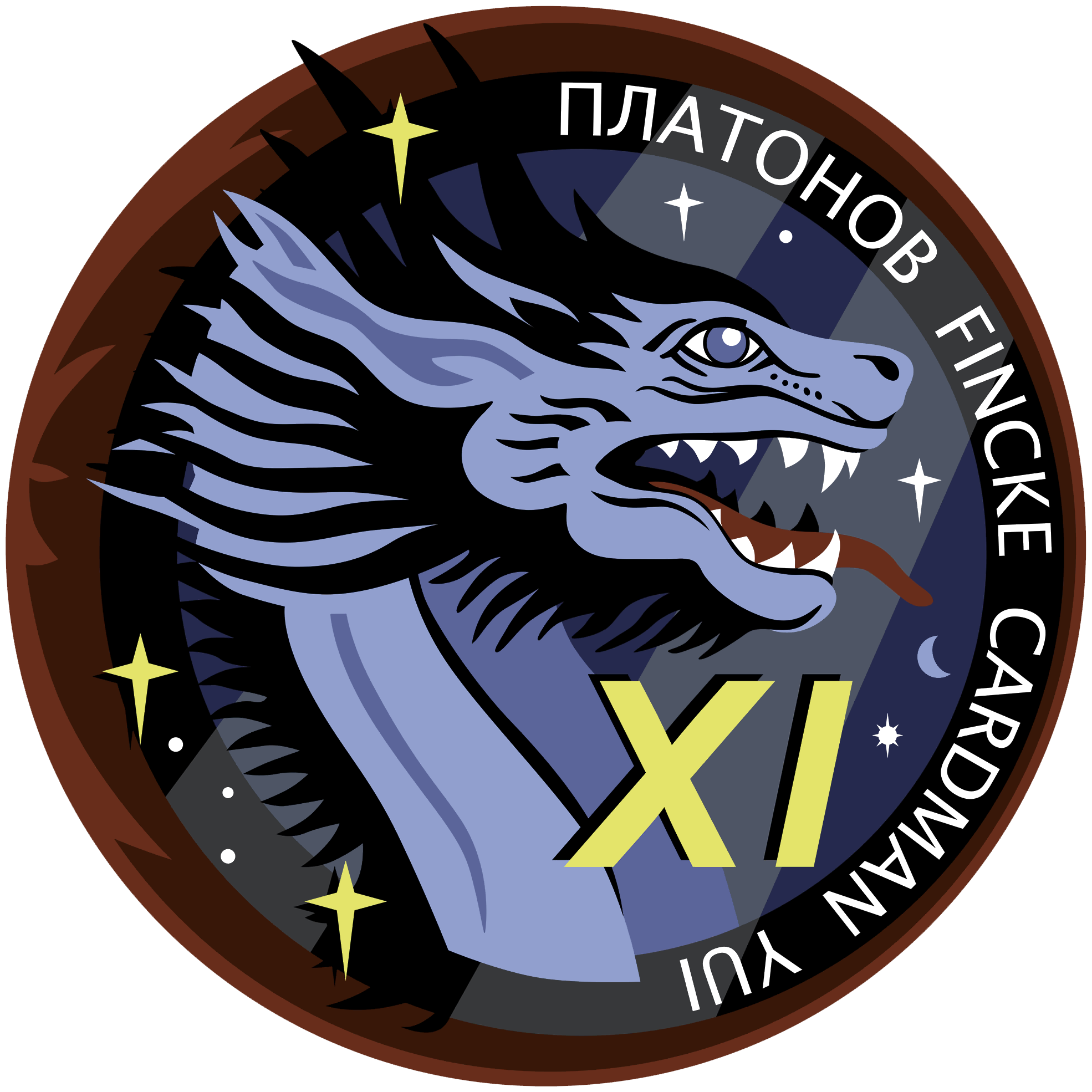
- NASA (left), SpaceX (middle), and JAXA (right) mission patches Clockwise, from top left: Platonov, Yui, Cardman, and Fincke Commercial Crew Program Crew Dragon flights

SpaceX Crew-11 was the eleventh operational NASA Commercial Crew Program flight and the 19th crewed orbital flight of a Crew Dragon spacecraft. The mission transported four crew members, NASA astronauts Zena Cardman and Michael Fincke, JAXA astronaut Kimiya Yui, and Roscosmos cosmonaut Oleg Platonov, to the International Space Station (ISS). The mission launched on August 1, 2025 and docked with the ISS the next day. On January 8, 2026, NASA announced that the mission would end about a month earlier than planned due to a medical situation involving Fincke.

== Crew ==
Zena Cardman was originally assigned to SpaceX Crew-9, but she and Stephanie Wilson were removed from that flight, which launched with only two crew members and returned with the crew of the Boeing Crew Flight Test due to issues with the Boeing Starliner Calypso, while Michael Fincke and Kimiya Yui were initially assigned to Boeing Starliner-1, but they were reassigned to Crew-11 due to testing with the Boeing Starliner capsule.

Prime crew
Position	Crew
Commander	Zena Cardman, NASA; Expedition 73/74; First spaceflight
Pilot	Michael Fincke, NASA; Expedition 73/74; Fourth and last spaceflight
Mission specialist	Kimiya Yui, JAXA; Expedition 73/74; Second spaceflight
Mission specialist	Oleg Platonov, Roscosmos; Expedition 73/74; First spaceflight

Backup crew
Position	Crew
Mission specialist	Oleg Artemyev, Roscosmos

== Mission ==
=== Launch ===
Attempt	Planned	Result	Turnaround	Reason	Decision point	Weather go (%)	Notes
1	31 Jul 2025, 12:09:20 pm	Scrubbed	—	Weather	31 Jul 2025, 12:08 pm (T−00:01:07)	90%	Storm clouds at launch pad.
2	1 Aug 2025, 11:43:42 am	Success	0 days 23 hours 34 minutes			75%	

The eleventh SpaceX operational mission in the Commercial Crew Program was scheduled for launch on July 31, 2025, but was scrubbed due to weather. After a quick turn around, SpaceX was able to launch the mission the next day on August 1, 2025. At 14 hours, 43 minutes, and 10 seconds, it was the fastest Crew Dragon rendezvous to date before later being surpassed by SpaceX Crew-13 at 7 hours, 55 minutes, and 10 seconds.

=== Medical incident ===
On January 7, 2026, NASA announced the mission would be shortened due to an undisclosed medical situation experienced by one of its crew members. The incident led to the cancellation of two planned spacewalks on January 8 and 15, including preparations for installation of ISS Roll-Out Solar Arrays (iROSAs) and other maintenance tasks on the Harmony module and the station’s S6 and S4 truss. At a news conference on January 8, 2026, NASA administrator Jared Isaacman announced that Crew-11 would return to Earth earlier than planned due to the medical situation. Crew-11 ultimately splashed down on January 15, 2026 about a month earlier than planned.

In a statement on February 25, 2026, Fincke revealed that he experienced the medical event, in which he was rendered unable to speak for a period of 20 minutes. He said that the event required immediate attention from his crewmates, and thanks to their actions under the guidance of NASA flight surgeons, he was quickly stabilized. He said that the decision to return home early was driven by a desire to take advantage of advanced medical imaging not available on the space station. After splashdown, Fincke was treated at Scripps Memorial Hospital La Jolla and stated that he is subsequently doing "very well".

== Gallery ==
SpaceX Crew-11
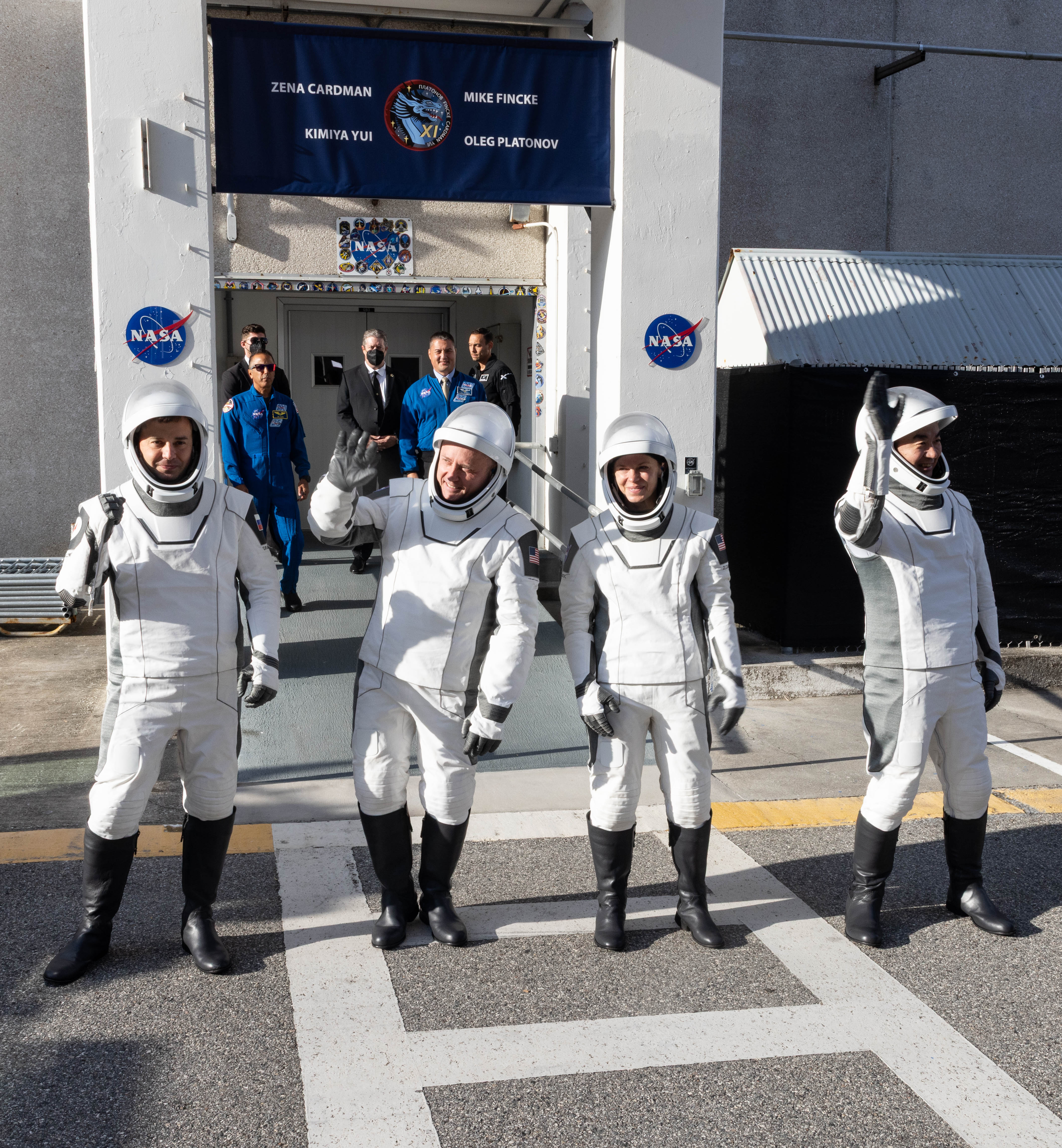
Crew-11 astronauts walk out from the O&C Building

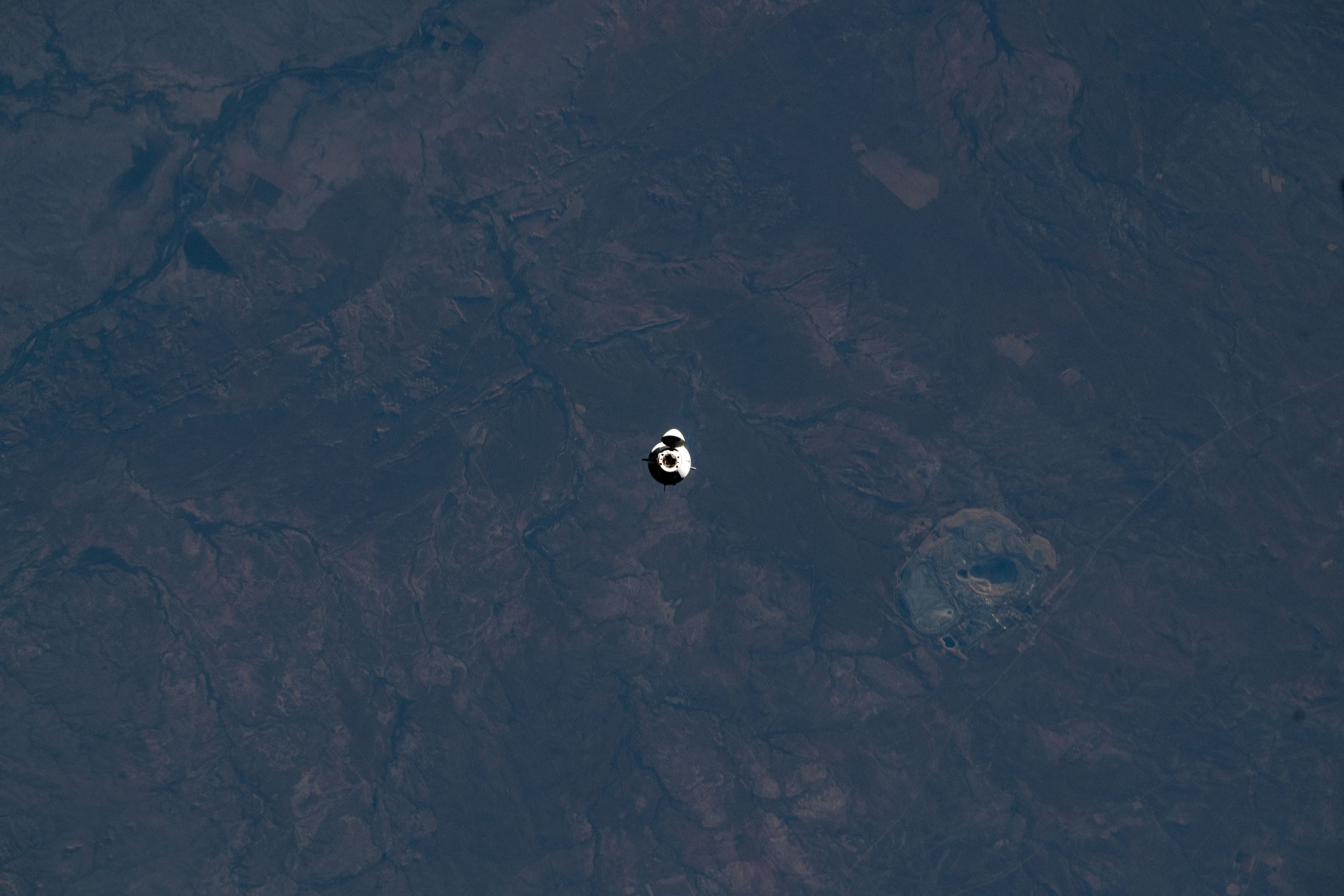
Crew Dragon Endeavour approaches the ISS

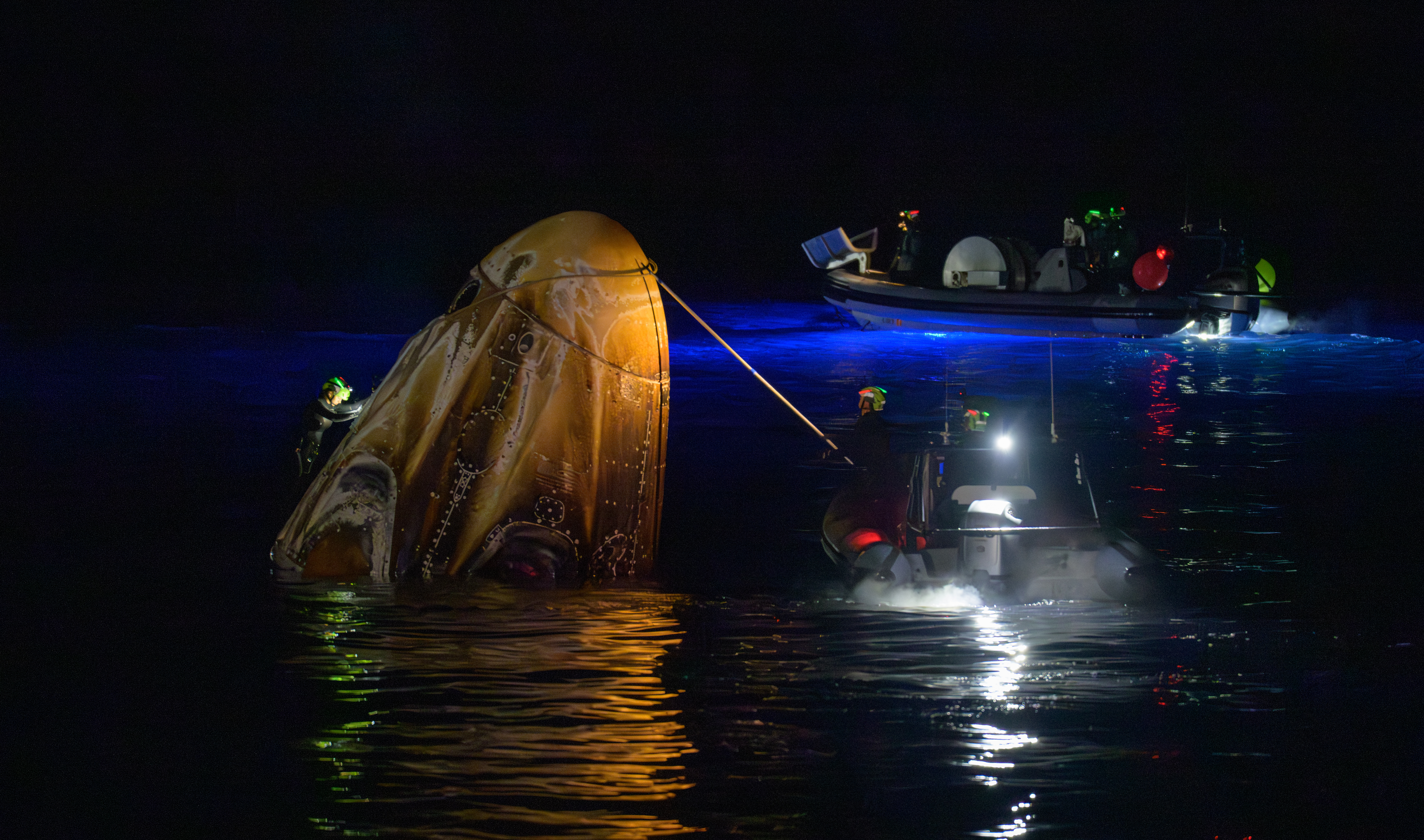
Support teams approach Crew Dragon Endeavour after splashdown in the Pacific Ocean
