= Progress MS-30 =

2025 Russian resupply spaceflight to the ISS

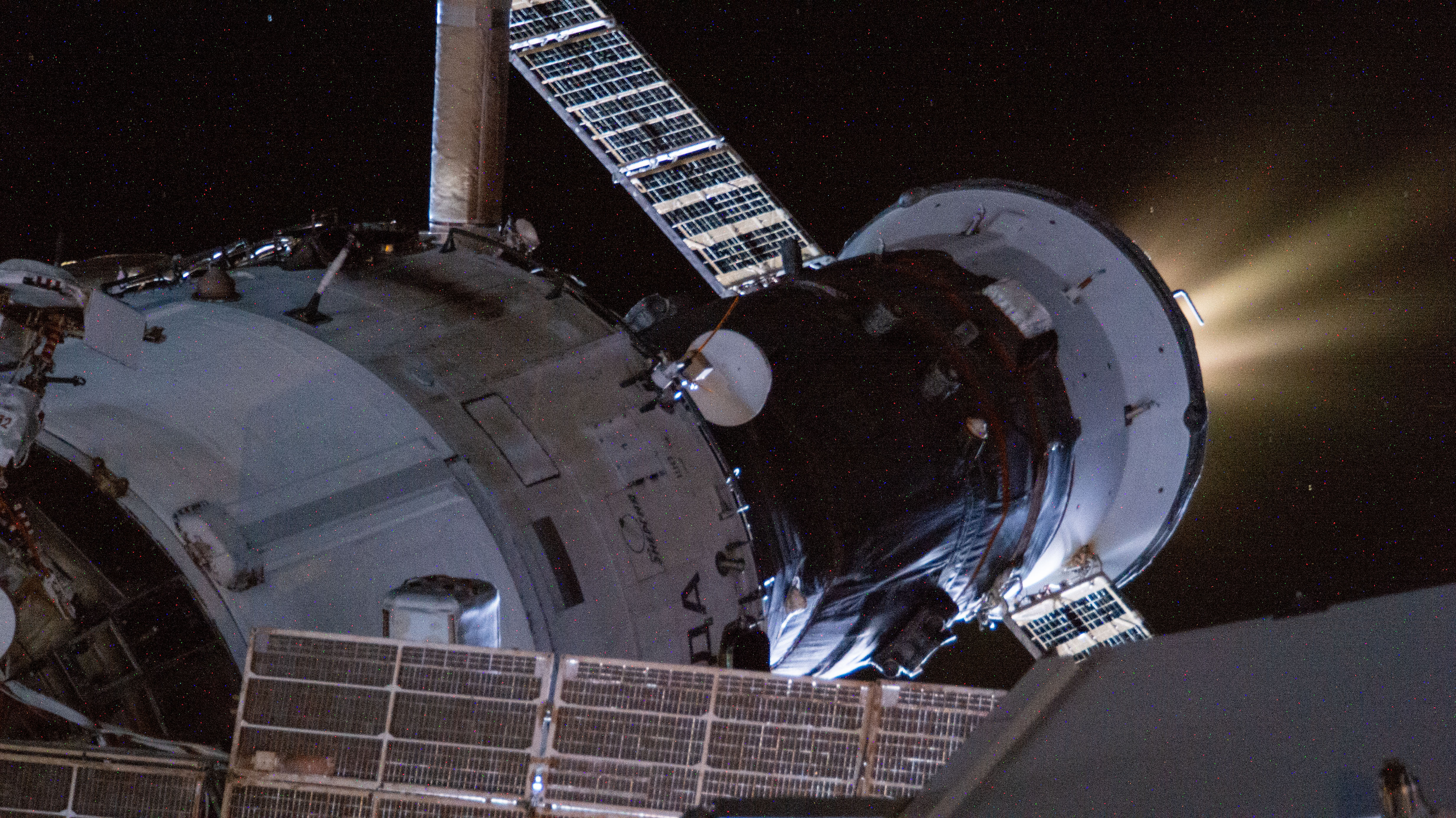
- Progress MS-30 fires its thrusters to reboost the International Space Station
- Names: Progress 91; ISS 91P
- Mission type: ISS resupply
- Operator: Roscosmos
- COSPAR ID: 2025-041B
- SATCAT no.: 63129
- Mission duration: 193 days, 22 hours and 34 minutes

Spacecraft properties
- Spacecraft: Progress MS-30 No. 460
- Spacecraft type: Progress MS
- Manufacturer: Energia
- Launch mass: 7,280 kg (16,050 lb)

Start of mission
- Launch date: 27 February 2025, 21:24:27 UTC (28 February 2025, 02:24:27 AQTT)
- Rocket: Soyuz-2.1a (No. M15000-076)
- Launch site: Baikonur, Site 31/6
- Contractor: RKTs Progress

End of mission
- Disposal: Deorbited
- Decay date: 9 September 2025, 19:59 UTC

Orbital parameters
- Reference system: Geocentric orbit
- Regime: Low Earth orbit
- Inclination: 51.65°

Docking with ISS
- Docking port: Zvezda aft
- Docking date: 1 March 2025, 23:02:30 UTC
- Undocking date: 9 September 2025, 15:45:30 UTC
- Time docked: 191 days, 16 hours and 43 minutes

Cargo
- Mass: 2,599 kg (5,730 lb)
- Pressurised: 1,179 kg (2,599 lb)
- Fuel: 950 kg (2,090 lb)
- Gaseous: 50 kg (110 lb)
- Water: 420 kg (930 lb)

Progress MS-30 (Russian: Прогресс МC-30), Russian production No. 460, identified by NASA as Progress 91, was a Progress spaceflight launched by Roscosmos to resupply the International Space Station (ISS). It is the 183rd flight of a Progress spacecraft.

== Mission ==
The Progress MS-30 cargo spacecraft was assembled by Energia in September 2024 and transported by rail from its manufacturing facility in Korolev, Russia to the Baikonur Cosmodrome in Kazakhstan, arriving by the end of the month. Final testing and processing began in mid-January 2025, with propellant and pressurized gas loading completed on 16 February. The loading of food and other supplies into the pressurized compartment followed on 18 February.

On 20 February, the spacecraft was attached to the launch vehicle adapter, and the next day, it was enclosed within the payload fairing, which featured an insignia commemorating the 100th birthday of Pavel Belyayev, commander of the Voskhod 2 mission that conducted the world's first spacewalk in 1965. The encapsulated spacecraft was transported by rail to Site 31/6 on 22 February and integrated with the Soyuz-2.1a rocket by 24 February. The rocket was rolled out to the launch pad on 25 February.

Progress MS-30 launched on 27 February 2025 at 21:24:27 UTC (28 February 2025 at 02:24:27 AQTT, local time at the launch site). Following a two-day free flight, it docked with the aft port of the ISS's Zvezda module on 1 March at 23:03 UTC.

== Manifest ==
Each Progress mission delivers over a thousand kilograms of supplies in its pressurized section, accessible to crewmembers. These supplies include consumables such as food, water, and air, along with equipment for maintenance and scientific research. In its unpressurized section, the spacecraft carries tanks of water, fuel, and gases to replenish the station’s resources and sustain its onboard atmosphere. These resources are transferred to the station through an automated process.

For this mission, Progress MS-30 was loaded with a total of 2,599 kg (5,730 lb) of cargo and supplies prior to launch. The cargo manifest includes the following:

- Pressurized supplies: 1,179 kg (2,599 lb)
- Fuel: 950 kg (2,090 lb)
- Water: 420 kg (930 lb)
- Nitrogen gas: 50 kg (110 lb)

Among the supplies loaded into the pressurized compartment was a new Orlan-MKS spacesuit.

== See also ==
- Uncrewed spaceflights to the International Space Station
- List of Progress missions
