= Progress MS-31 =

2025 Russian resupply spaceflight to the ISS

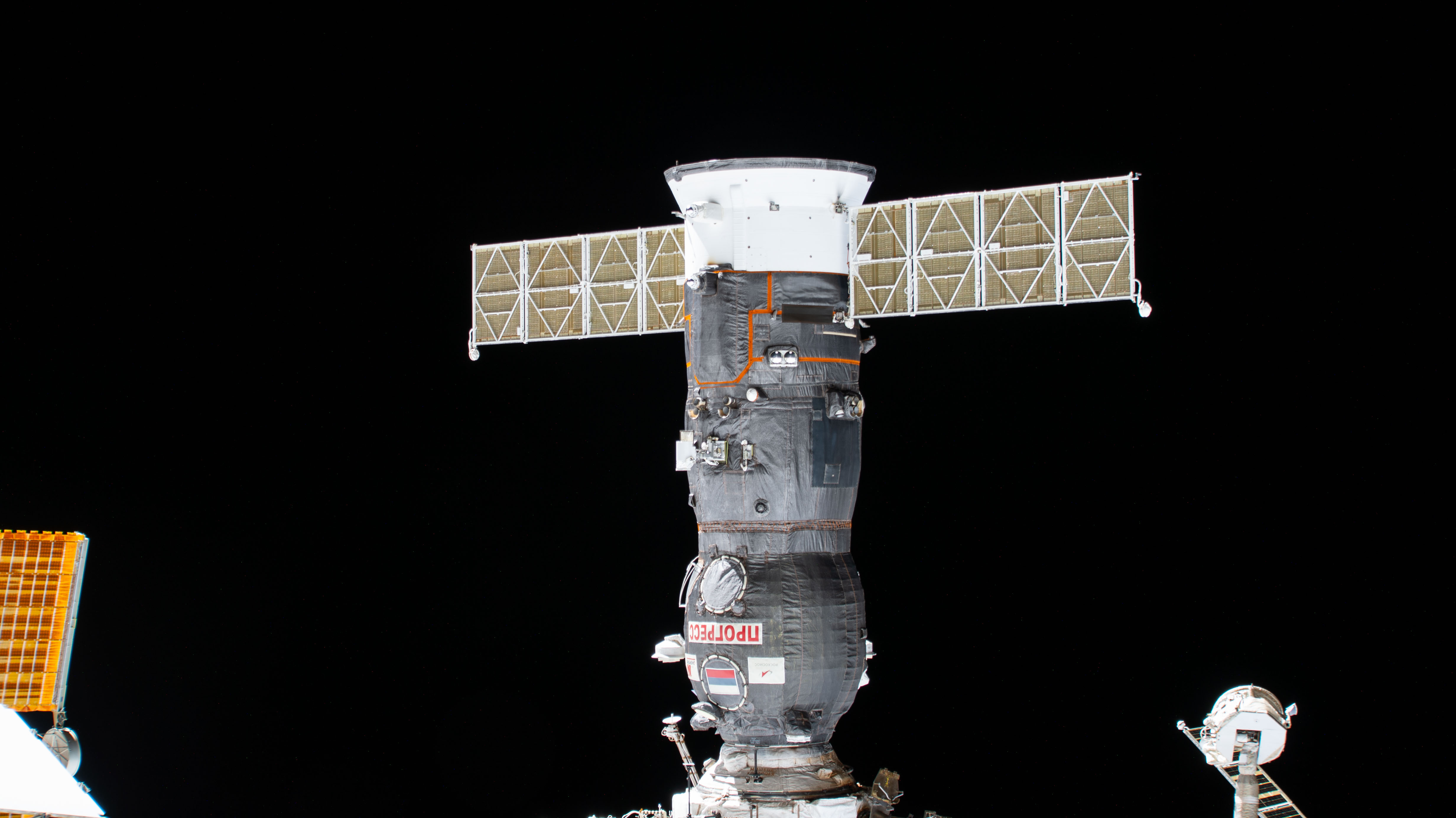
- Progress MS-31 docked to the Poisk module
- Names: Progress 92; ISS 92P
- Mission type: ISS resupply
- Operator: Roscosmos
- COSPAR ID: 2025-146A
- SATCAT no.: 64751
- Mission duration: 255 days, 21 hours and 49 minutes

Spacecraft properties
- Spacecraft: Progress MS-31 No. 461
- Spacecraft type: Progress MS
- Manufacturer: Energia
- Launch mass: 7,280 kg (16,050 lb)

Start of mission
- Launch date: 3 July 2025, 19:32:40 UTC (4 July 2025, 00:32:40 AQTT)
- Rocket: Soyuz-2.1a
- Launch site: Baikonur, Site 31/6
- Contractor: RKTs Progress

End of mission
- Disposal: Deorbited
- Decay date: 16 March 2026, 17:21 UTC

Orbital parameters
- Reference system: Geocentric orbit
- Regime: Low Earth orbit
- Inclination: 51.65°

Docking with ISS
- Docking port: Poisk zenith
- Docking date: 5 July 2025, 21:25 UTC
- Undocking date: 16 March 2026, 13:24 UTC
- Time docked: 253 days, 15 hours and 59 minutes

Cargo
- Mass: 2,625 kg (5,787 lb)
- Pressurised: 1,205 kg (2,657 lb)
- Fuel: 950 kg (2,090 lb)
- Gaseous: 50 kg (110 lb)
- Water: 420 kg (930 lb)

Progress MS-31 (Russian: Прогресс МC-31), Russian production No. 461, identified by NASA as Progress 92, was a Progress cargo spacecraft launched by Roscosmos to resupply the International Space Station (ISS). It is the 184th flight of a Progress spacecraft.

== Mission ==
Progress MS-31 was launched on 3 July 2025 at 19:32 UTC. Following a two-day free flight, it docked to the zenith (space-facing) port of the ISS's Poisk module on 5 July at 21:27 UTC.

== Cargo ==
Each Progress mission delivers pressurized and unpressurized cargo to the station. The pressurized section carries consumables such as food, water, and air, along with equipment for maintenance and scientific research. The unpressurized section contains tanks of fuel, water, and gases, which are transferred to the station through automated systems.

For this mission, Progress MS-31 carried a total of 2,625 kg (5,787 lb) of cargo and supplies, including:

- Pressurized supplies: 1,205 kg (2,657 lb)
- Fuel: 950 kg (2,090 lb)
- Water: 420 kg (930 lb)
- Nitrogen gas: 50 kg (110 lb)

== See also ==
- Uncrewed spaceflights to the International Space Station
- List of Progress missions
