= 2025 in spaceflight =

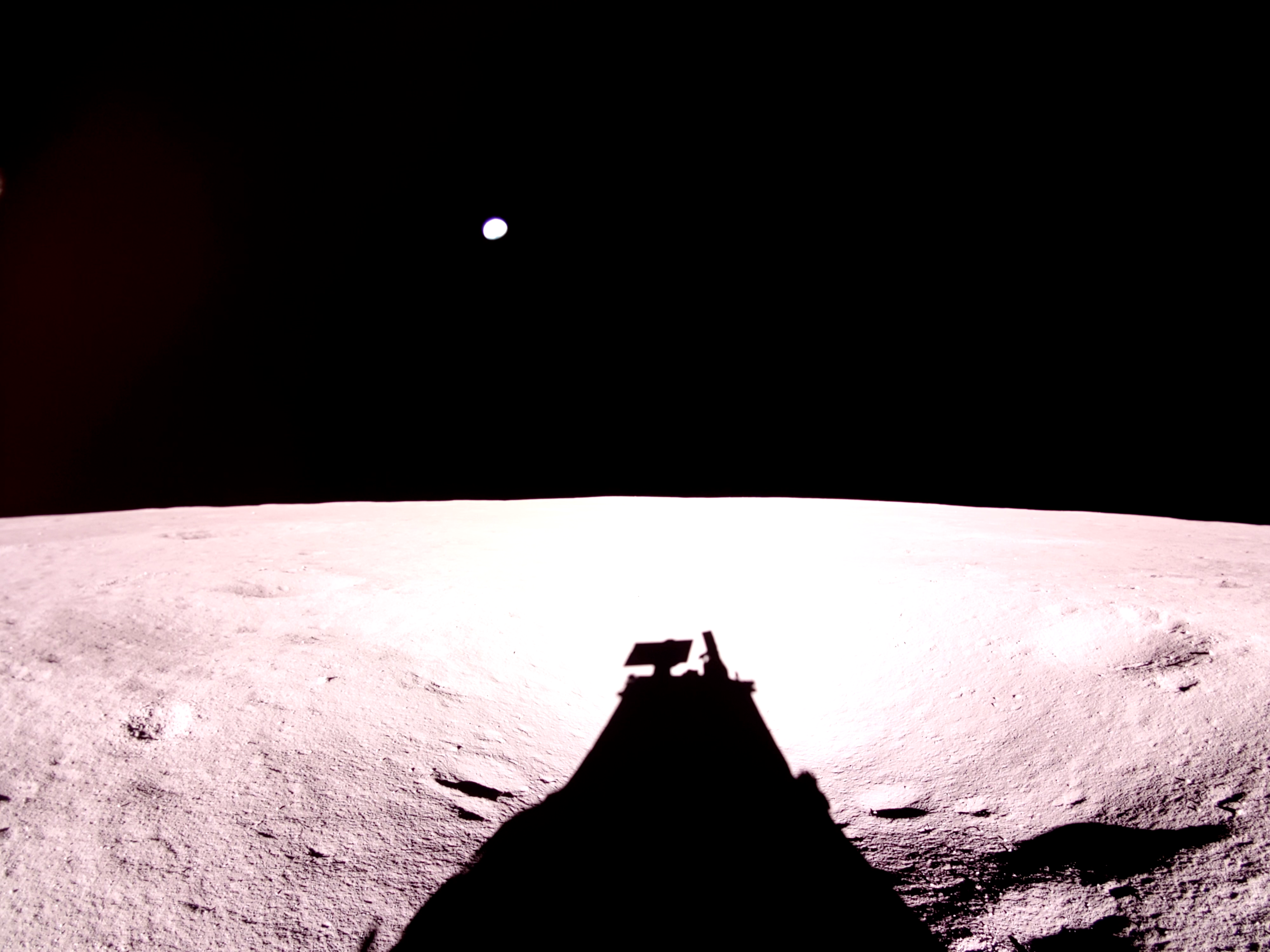
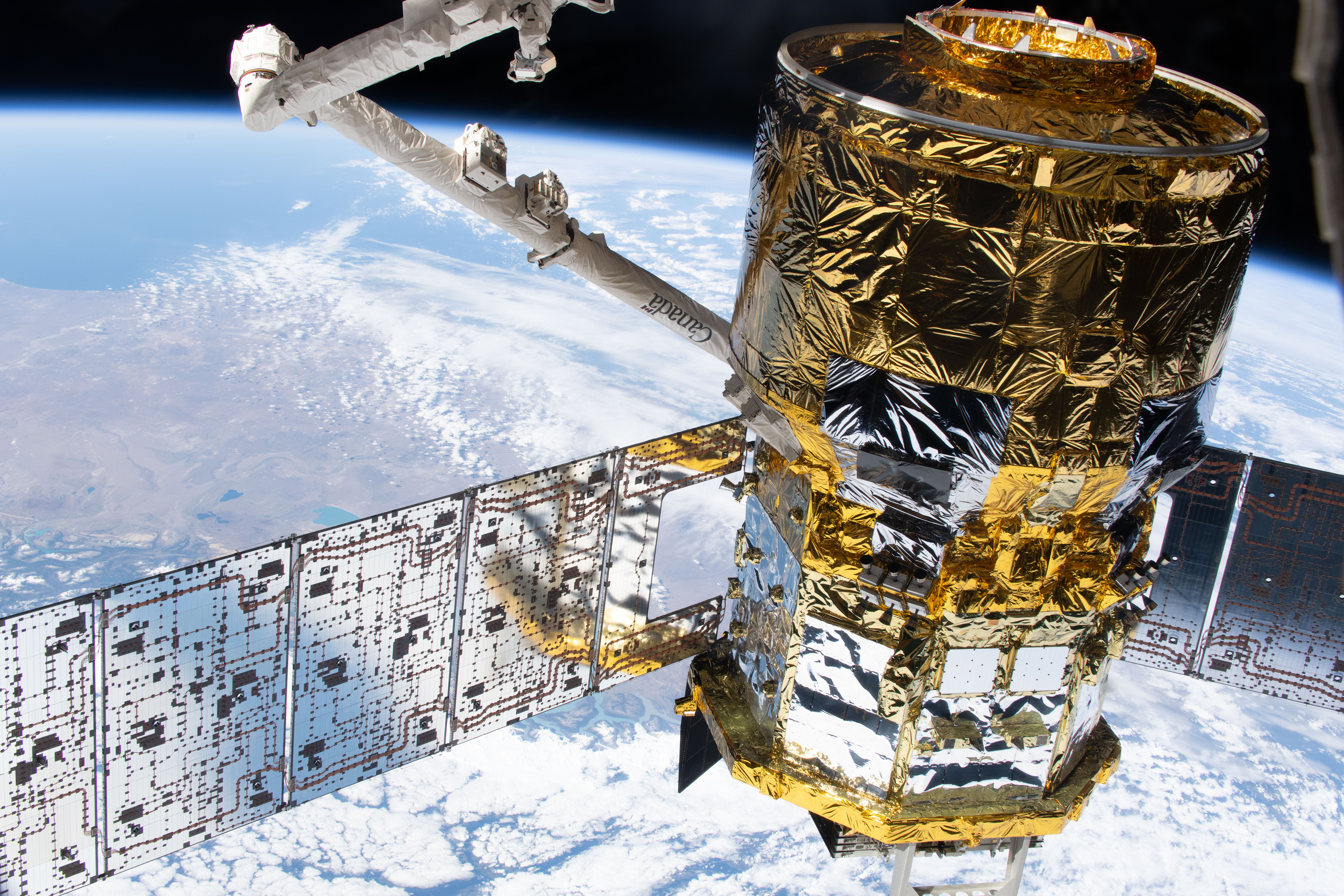
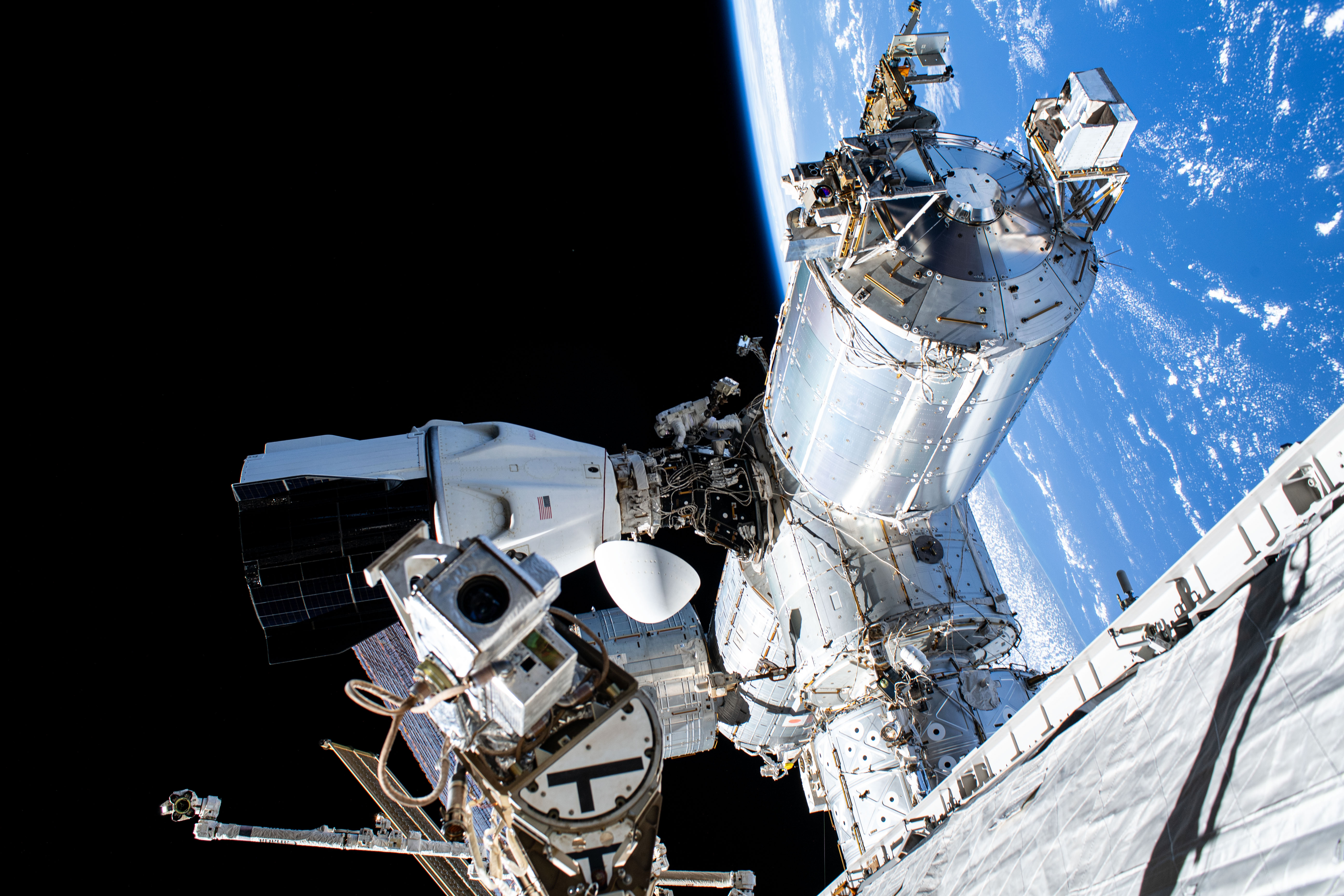
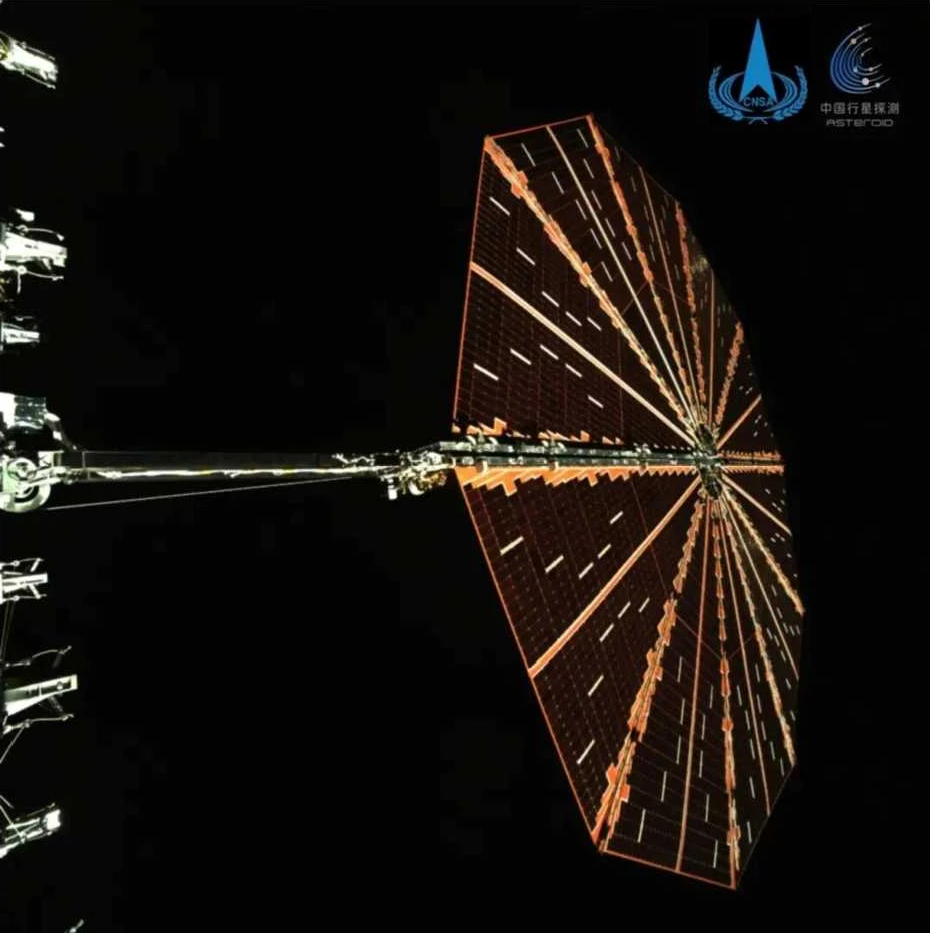
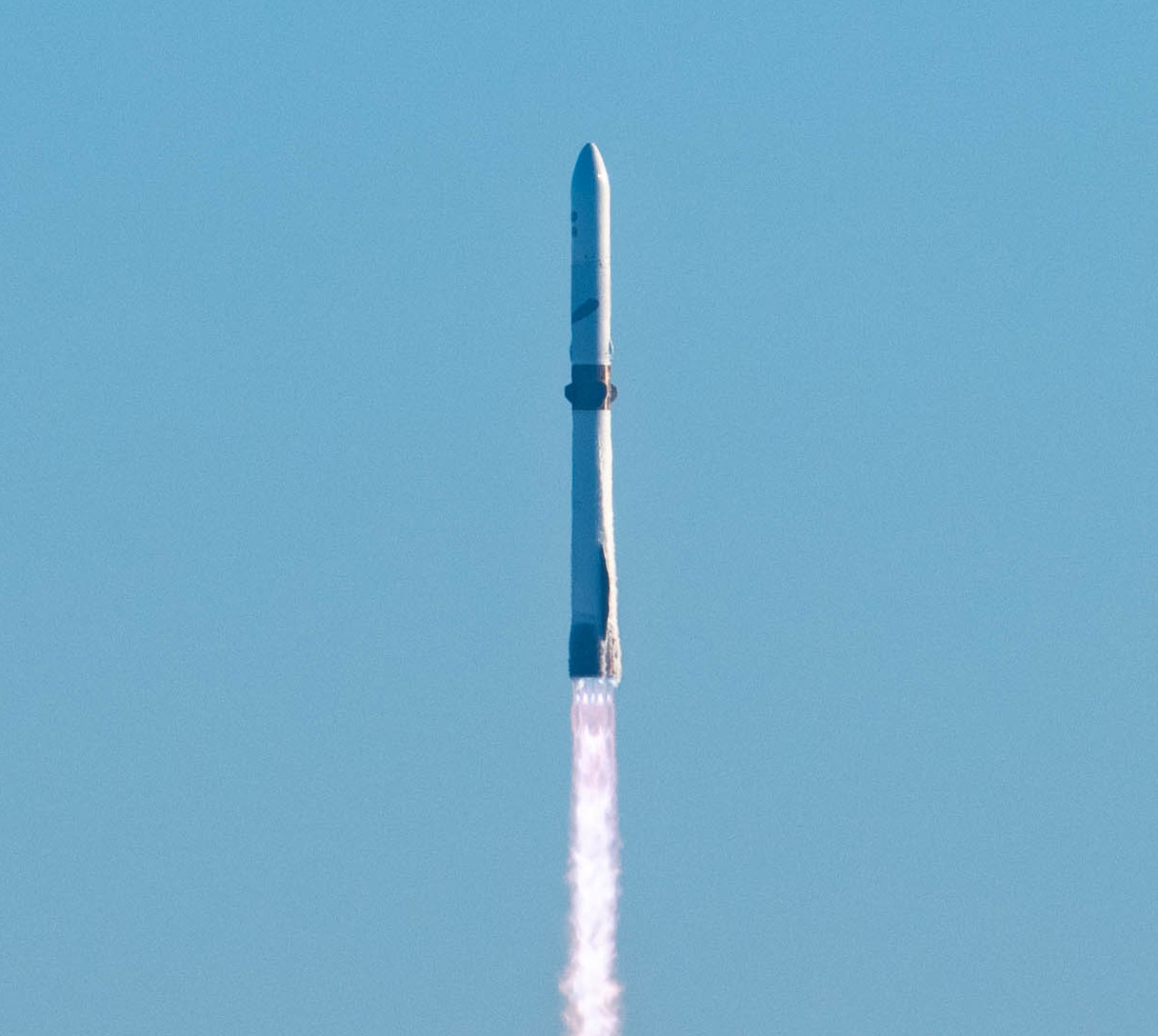
- Highlights from spaceflight in 2025 (Note: Clockwise from top: Firefly Aerospace's Blue Ghost lunar lander successfully landed on the Moon.; Butch Wilmore and Sunita Williams (pictured on a spacewalk) successfully returned to Earth aboard SpaceX Crew-9 after launching on the anomaly-plagued Starliner Crewed Flight Test; Blue Origin launched New Glenn twice, successfully recovering the first stage on the second flight (pictured).; Solar arrays of Tianwen-2 probe launched by CNSA on its way towards asteroid 469219 Kamoʻoalewa.; JAXA launched HTV-X on a test flight to the ISS.)

Orbital launches
- First: 4 January
- Last: 30 December
- Total: 330
- Successes: 317
- Failures: 13
- Partial failures: 0

National firsts
- Satellite: Botswana; Montenegro
- Space traveller: Bahamas; Malta; Saint Kitts and Nevis; Panama; New Zealand; Nigeria

Rockets
- Maiden flights: Eris-1; H3-24W; HANBIT-Nano; Long March 8A; Long March 12A; New Glenn 7×2; Spectrum; Starship Block 2; Vulcan Centaur VC4S; Zhuque-3
- Retirements: H-IIA 202 (Note: Last active configuration of this launch vehicle to be retired); Soyuz-2.1v / Volga; Starship Block 2

Crewed flights
- Orbital: 8
- Orbital travellers: 28
- Suborbital: 7
- Suborbital travellers: 42
- Total travellers: 70
- EVAs: 6

2025 in spaceflight

Spaceflight in 2025 followed the 2020s trend of record-breaking numbers of orbital launches with 317 successes and new developments in low-Earth orbit human spaceflight (Fram2, Cygnus XL, HTV-X). Spaceflight in 2025 included numerous private companies' launches using reusable launch vehicles (Falcon 9 and for the first time also New Glenn). Three private robotic landers attempted landing on the Moon, resulting in one full (Blue Ghost M1) and one partial success (IM-2).

Among the year's highlights in Solar system science were launches and innovative operations of seven heliophysics and space weather missions by NASA, NOAA, and ESA (PUNCH, TRACERS, IMAP, SWFO-L1, Carruthers, PROBA-3, and Solar Orbiter). In 2025, humanity got the first close-up view of one new Solar system object, the main belt asteroid Donaldjohanson visited by the NASA probe Lucy. CNSA launched the Tianwen-2 asteroid sample return mission and NASA launched the twin ESCAPADE spacecraft to study the atmosphere of Mars.

== Overview ==
=== Astronomy and astrophysics ===
In March 2025, NASA launched two astronomy missions on a single Falcon 9 flight to low-Earth orbit. SPHEREx is a space telescope designed to perform an all-sky survey to measure the near-infrared spectra of hundreds of millions of galaxies. PUNCH is a constellation of four small satellites for observing the Sun's corona.

ESA's PROBA-3 mission, launched in December 2024, successfully demonstrated precise formation flying of a space telescope spacecraft and an occulter spacecraft, delivering its first coronography pictures of the Sun in June 2025.

=== Exploration of the Solar System ===
On 18 February, ESA's Solar Orbiter left the orbital plane of the solar system after successfully completing its 4th Venus flyby, tilting its orbit to 17°. The mission's first images and videos of the Sun's south pole were taken in March and then released on 11 June. These are the first images of the Sun's poles taken from outside the ecliptic plane.

AstroForge's Brokkr-2 was launched on 27 February to perform a flyby of a near-Earth asteroid and determine if the asteroid is metallic. The mission failed due to communication issues.

China launched the Tianwen-2 (ZhengHe) asteroid sample-return and comet probe on 28 May. It will rendezvous with near-Earth asteroid 469219 Kamo'oalewa in mid-2026, attempt to collect samples, and return samples back to Earth in late 2027. Then it will travel to main-belt comet 311P/PANSTARRS for a decade-long mission to further explore the mysterious comet-like object.

On 10 September 2025, a paper was published in Nature that discussed potential biosignatures in the Martian rock Cheyava Falls discovered by NASA's Perseverance rover in 2024. According to NASA, these results are "the closest we have ever come to discovering life on Mars".

NASA's twin ESCAPADE spacecraft were launched on 13 November on New Glenn with the aim of investigating the effects of the solar wind on the Martian atmosphere. The two spacecraft were launched on an innovative trajectory where they stay in a staging orbit around the Sun-Earth Lagrange point L_{2} until late 2026 when the Mars transfer window opens.

Multiple American, Chinese, and European interplanetary spacecraft attempted observing the third known interstellar object 3I/ATLAS, which had its closest approach to the Sun in 2025. The observations by ESA's Trace Gas Orbiter were used to predict the object's path, resulting in a substantial increase in accuracy. This was the first time that astrometric data from a spacecraft at another planet have been accepted in the Minor Planet Center's database.

On 6 December, NASA lost contact with the MAVEN spacecraft orbiting Mars.

=== Lunar exploration ===
On 15 January, Blue Ghost Mission 1 by Firefly Aerospace and Hakuto-R Mission 2 by ispace launched together on a Falcon 9.

Firefly Aerospace's lunar lander carried NASA-sponsored experiments and commercial payloads as a part of Commercial Lunar Payload Services program to Mare Crisium. Landing was completed successfully on 2 March 2025. The mission exceeded expectations by transmitting over 110 GB of scientific and imaging data, including high‐definition views of the lunar horizon glow and an eclipse, far surpassing previous CLPS mission data yields.

Epic Aerospace's Chimera-1 Space tug was planned to transition from TLI to Geosynchronous but failed due to a possible communication failure.

On 5 June, Hakuto-R Mission 2, carrying the RESILIENCE lunar lander and the TENACIOUS micro rover, attempted a landing in Mare Frigoris but crashed into the lunar surface.

Intuitive Machines's lunar lander IM-2, carrying NASA-sponsored experiments and commercial rovers (Yaoki, AstroAnt, Micro-Nova, and MAPP LV1) and payloads as a part of Commercial Lunar Payload Services program to Mons Mouton, was launched on 27 February 2025 on a Falcon 9 launch vehicle with Brokkr-2 and Lunar Trailblazer. IM-2 landed on 6 March 2025. The spacecraft was intact after touchdown but resting on its side, thereby complicating its planned science and technology demonstration mission; this outcome is similar to what occurred with the company's IM-1 Odysseus spacecraft in 2024.

NASA's Lunar Trailblazer aimed to aid in the understanding of lunar water and the Moon's water cycle. The mission failed as contact was never established with spacecraft after launch.

=== Human spaceflight ===
On 30 January, Sunita Williams broke the world record for the most time spent on spacewalk by a woman when she accumulated 62 hours and 6 minutes on her ninth EVA. The record was previously held by Peggy Whitson with 60 hours and 21 minutes.

On 1 April at 01:46 (UTC), (Note: SpaceX's Fram2 mission launched on March 31, 2025 at 9:46 PM EDT.) Fram2 launched aboard a SpaceX Falcon 9 rocket, becoming the first crewed spaceflight to enter a polar retrograde orbit, i.e., to fly over Earth's poles.

The Axiom Mission 4 to the ISS (25 June to 15 July), which debuted the newest Crew Dragon capsule Grace, carried a four-person crew including commander Peggy Whitson, pilot Shubhanshu Shukla of ISRO, and mission specialists Sławosz Uznański-Wiśniewski, an ESA project astronaut from Poland, and Tibor Kapu, representing the Hungarian Space Office. For India, this was the first human spaceflight mission under the Gaganyyan program. For India, Poland, and Hungary, this was their second human spaceflight after their first astronauts participated in the Interkosmos program in the 1970s and 1980s.

In September, Northrop Grumman debuted the newest version of its uncrewed resupply spacecraft, Cygnus XL, with increased payload capacity and pressurized volume.

JAXA debuted its new resupply spacecraft, HTV-X, that flew aboard H3 on 26 October 2025 (HTV-X1) and successfully arrived at ISS on 29 October 2025.

The Chinese crewed spacecraft Shenzhou 20 was expected to return to Earth in early November 2025 after the arrival of the Shenzhou 21 crew to the Tiangong space station. However, due to suspected space debris damage, the Shenzhou 20 crew returned to Earth on 14 November using the Shenzhou 21 spacecraft instead. On 25 November, China launched the Shenzhou 22 spacecraft without crew to serve as a replacement return craft for the Shenzhou 21 crew. Shenzhou 20 subsequently returned uncrewed on 19 January 2026.

The Russian Soyuz MS vehicle No. 759, planned for the Soyuz MS-28 mission, was damaged during testing. Roscosmos replaced it with the vehicle No. 753, previously intended for commercial missions which had been cancelled following Russia's invasion of Ukraine. During the launch of Soyuz MS-28 to ISS on 27 November, the Site 31 launch complex at the Baikonur Cosmodrome, Russia's only launch site for flights to the ISS, sustained substantial damage.

Following the reberthing of Cygnus NG-23 to Unity module on 1 December 2025, for the first time, all eight International Space Station docking ports were occupied. It was held on Canadarm2 away from its docking port on 24 November 2025, as its position would otherwise interfere with the approach corridor for Soyuz MS-28 at the Rassvet nadir docking port. The space station currently hosts: SpaceX Dragon 2s (Crew-11 and CRS-33), Northrop Grumman's Cygnus XL (NG-23), JAXA’s HTV-X1, Roscosmos' Soyuz MS (MS-27 and MS-28), Progress MS (MS-31 and MS-32) spacecraft. Alongside all the three docking ports of Tiangong Space Station were occupied by Shenzhou spacecraft (20 and 22) and Tianzhou 9 spacecraft.

=== Rocket innovation ===
Blue Origin completed the maiden flight of its New Glenn rocket on 16 January 2025. The second stage successfully placed its payload into orbit, while the first stage failed to land on the recovery ship offshore. On its second flight on 13 November, the first stage "Never Tell Me The Odds" landed on the Jacklyn drone ship, making it the first non-SpaceX orbital-class booster to successfully land propulsively.

Zhuque-3 became the first non-American launch vehicle to attempt recovery of its first stage booster when it launched on its maiden flight on December 3. An anomaly during its landing burn resulted in a crash landing. A second attempt from a Chinese rocket was made on 23 December with the debut flight of Long March 12A. While the launch itself was successful the booster failed to land.

=== Satellite technology ===
ISRO successfully completed the docking of two SpaDeX satellites (SDX-01 & SDX-02) in the early hours of 16 January 2025. With this success, India became one of the few countries in the world to have achieved a successful in-space docking using indigenous technology.

Kuiper Systems, Amazon's satellite internet subsidiary, has started initial launches. It plans a constellation of over 3,000 satellites. The launches will occur on Atlas V, Falcon 9, Vulcan Centaur, Ariane 6 and New Glenn launch vehicles.

Guowang, a Chinese satellite internet constellation, has started regular launches. A constellation of over 13,000 satellites in low-Earth orbit is expected by the project's end.

NASA-ISRO Synthetic Aperture Radar (NISAR), a joint project between NASA and ISRO to co-develop and launch a dual-frequency synthetic aperture radar satellite that is used for remote sensing was launched on 30 July 2025. It is notable for being the first dual-band radar imaging satellite.

ESA launched four new missions for the EU's Earth observation programme Copernicus. The atmosphere-monitoring Sentinel-4A and Sentinel-5A launched in July and August aboard other European satellites in a two-missions-one-satellite approach, while the radar missions Sentinel-1D and Sentinel-6B launched as standalone spacecraft in November. ESA also launched two new Earth observation satellite missions of its FutureEO programme, the radar-equipped Earth Explorer 7 Biomass for monitoring carbon storage in forests and a pair of HydroGNSS satellites for GNSS reflectometry, the first Scout-type mission of the programme. Furthermore, the ESA-supported Earth observation constellations AIX, HiVE, and IRIDE launched their first satellites in 2025.

== Orbital launches ==
Numbers of orbital launches
| Month | Total | Successes | Failures | Partial failures |
|---|---|---|---|---|
| January | 22 | 21 | 1 | 0 |
| February | 20 | 20 | 0 | 0 |
| March | 27 | 24 | 3 | 0 |
| April | 26 | 25 | 1 | 0 |
| May | 29 | 27 | 2 | 0 |
| June | 25 | 25 | 0 | 0 |
| July | 24 | 23 | 1 | 0 |
| August | 29 | 28 | 1 | 0 |
| September | 31 | 30 | 1 | 0 |
| October | 26 | 26 | 0 | 0 |
| November | 31 | 30 | 1 | 0 |
| December | 40 | 38 | 2 | 0 |
| Total | 330 | 317 | 13 | 0 |

== Deep-space rendezvous ==
| Date (UTC) | Spacecraft | Event | Remarks |
|---|---|---|---|
| 8 January | BepiColombo | Sixth gravity assist at Mercury | Success |
| 13 February | Blue Ghost Mission 1 | Lunar orbit insertion | Success |
| 14 February | Hakuto-R Mission 2 | Lunar flyby | This flyby placed the lander into a low-energy ballistic transfer orbit for capture into lunar orbit in mid-May. |
| 18 February | Solar Orbiter | Fourth gravity assist at Venus | This flyby of Venus will increase the inclination of the spacecraft's orbit from about 7.7 to around 17 degrees. |
| 1 March | Europa Clipper | Gravity assist at Mars | Success, target altitude of 884 km |
| 2 March | Blue Ghost Mission 1 | Lunar landing | Success; Landing site is in Mare Crisium near Mons Latreille, coordinates 18.56°N 61.81°E |
| 2 March | Juno | 70th perijove | On the day of this perijove, Juno flew by Thebe at a distance of 31,780 km. |
| 3 March | IM-2 Athena | Lunar orbit insertion | Success |
| 6 March | IM-2 Athena | Lunar landing | Partial success; Lander tipped over after touchdown. Landing site is on Mons Mouton, coordinates 84.7906°S 29.1957°E) |
| 12 March | Hera | Gravity assist at Mars | Success, target altitude of 5,000 km Conducted observations and a flyby of the Martian moon Deimos |
| 22 March | Parker Solar Probe | 23rd perihelion | Success |
| 20 April | Lucy | Flyby of asteroid 52246 Donaldjohanson | Success, target altitude 922 km |
| 6 May | Hakuto-R Mission 2 | Lunar orbit insertion | Success |
| 10 May | Kosmos 482 descent stage | Earth entry and impact | The Blok L upper stage failed to deliver the spacecraft to a Venus transfer orbit, stranding Kosmos 482's descent stage in orbit for 53 years (other components entered as early as 1972). The stage's entry was monitored by Roscosmos, with the vehicle impacting the Indian Ocean west of Jakarta. |
| 5 June | Hakuto-R Mission 2 | Lunar landing | Landing targeted for Mare Frigoris, landing failure |
| 19 June | Parker Solar Probe | 24th perihelion | Success |
| 31 August | Juice | Gravity assist at Venus | Success, target altitude of 5,088 km |
| 14 September | Juno | 76th perijove | End of second mission extension. On the day of this perijove, Juno flew by Io and begun a third mission extension. |
| 15 September | Parker Solar Probe | 25th perihelion | Success |
| 23 September | OSIRIS-APEX | Gravity assist at Earth | Success, target altitude 3,442 km |
| 6 November | Chandrayaan-3 Propulsion module | Lunar Flyby | Success, target altitude of 3,740 km from lunar surface, spacecraft outside communication range. |
| 11 November | Chandrayaan-3 Propulsion module | Lunar Flyby | Success, target altitude of 4,537 km from lunar surface, conducted engineering and scientific tests as well as an orbit change manoeuvre. |
| 12 December | Parker Solar Probe | 26th perihelion | Success |

== Extravehicular activities (EVAs) ==
| Start date/time | Duration | End time | Spacecraft | Crew | Remarks |
|---|---|---|---|---|---|
| 16 January; 13:01 | 6 hours | 19:01 | Expedition 72; ISS Quest | (United States) Nick Hague; (United States) Sunita Williams | Hague and Williams ventured outside and replaced the Rate Gyro Assembly Gyroscope 2 on the S0 Truss, replaced the retro reflectors on IDA 3, installed shields on NICER to patch holes in the light shades, relocated the C2V2 cables out of the way so the astronauts and Canadarm 2 could access the worksite, tested a tool on the AMS jumpers, and photographed the AMS jumpers so they can be de-mated on a future spacewalk. As part of a get-ahead task, they inspected an ammonia vent line on Unity and inspected a foot restraint located near the Z1 Radio Antenna. This spacewalk was originally supposed to be performed by Andreas Mogensen and Loral O'Hara during Expedition 70, but it was delayed indefinitely due to a radiator leak on Nauka. |
| 20 January; 08:55 | 8 hours, 17 minutes | 17:12 | Shenzhou 19; TSS Wentian | (China) Cai Xuzhe; (China) Song Lingdong | Tasks included installation of space debris protection devices and inspections of the exterior of the TSS. |
| 30 January; 12:43 | 5 hours, 26 minutes | 18:09 | Expedition 72; ISS Quest | (United States) Sunita Williams; (United States) Barry Wilmore | Wilmore and Williams successfully removed a faulty radio communications unit, although the time needed for this meant that other tasks that were scheduled for the spacewalk weren't accomplished. Williams broke the record for the woman to have spent the most on EVA, with a total of 62 hours and 6 minutes. |
| 1 May; 13:05 | 5 hours, 44 minutes | 18:49 | Expedition 73; ISS Quest | (United States) Anne McClain; (United States) Nichole Ayers | McClain and Ayers relocated a communications antenna, installed a mounting bracket for a future Roll Out Solar Array, installed a jumper cable to provide power from the P6 truss to the Russian Orbital Segment and removed bolts from a micrometeoroid cover. |
| 22 May; 00:50 | 7 hours, 59 minutes | 08:49 | Shenzhou 20; TSS Tianhe | (China) Chen Dong; (China) Chen Zhongrui | Tasks included installation of more space debris protection devices and inspections of the exterior, fixing damages to the TSS. First Chinese EVA from core module since transitioning into application and development phase. |
| 26 June; 07:00 | 6 hours, 29 minutes | 13:29 | Shenzhou 20; TSS Wentian | (China) Chen Dong; (China) Chen Zhongrui | Tasks included installation of more space debris protection devices and inspections of the exterior, fixing damages to the TSS. They added foot restraints and EVA interface adapters on portable work platform for future EVAs. |
| 15 August; 04:17 | 6 hours, 30 minutes | 10:47 | Shenzhou 20; TSS Wentian | (China) Chen Dong; (China) Wang Jie | Tasks included completing installation of debris protection devices and auxiliary extravehicular facilities, and inspecting and maintaining external equipment. |
| 25 September; 11:30 | 6 hours, 35 minutes | 17:35 | Shenzhou 20; TSS Wentian | (China) Chen Zhongrui; (China) Wang Jie | Tasks included completing installation of debris protection devices for the space station and inspecting external equipment and facilities. It marked the first time that two members of China's third batch of taikonauts jointly carried out an EVA. So far, the Shenzhou-20 crew has completed four EVAs, making them one of the Chinese crews with the most extravehicular missions. |
| 16 October; 17:10 | 6 hours, 9 minutes | 23:19 | Expedition 73; ISS Poisk | (Russia) Sergey Ryzhikov; (Russia) Alexey Zubritsky | Ryzhikov and Zubritsky ventured out and installed the Ekran-M payload onto the Nauka Module frame, jettisoned some cameras and a mounting platform, and cleaned the windows on the Zvezda Service Module. As getahead task they removed SKK panel 3 and Biorisk container 2 and brought them inside. |
| 28 October; 14:18 | 6 hours, 54 minutes | 21:12 | Expedition 73; ISS Poisk | (Russia) Sergey Ryzhikov; (Russia) Alexey Zubritsky | Ryzhikov and Zubritsky ventured out and installed the IPI plasma injector onto the Nauka Module, relocated the ERA control panel, cleaned the Nauka science window, and replaced a cassette in the Ekran-M payload which was installed on the last spacewalk. The original task to jettison some hardware on the Zvezda Service Module and some window cleaning equipment will be moved to the next spacewalk to prevent debris strikes on the HTV-X, which is on final approach. |
| 9 December; 02:28 | 8 hours, 17 minutes | 10:45 | Shenzhou 21; TSS Wentian | (China) Zhang Lu; (China) Wu Fei | Tasks included inspecting and photographing the window of the Shenzhou 20 reentry capsule, installing space debris protection devices outside the Tianhe core module, and replacing the multi-layer cover of the temperature control adapter. |

== Orbital launch statistics ==
=== By country ===
For the purposes of this section, the yearly tally of orbital launches by country assigns each flight to the country of origin of the rocket, not to the launch services provider or the spaceport. For a launch attempt to be considered orbital it must be trying to achieve a positive perigee. Launches from the Moon are not included in the statistics.

| Country | Launches | Successes | Failures | Partial failures |
|---|---|---|---|---|
| Australia | 1 | 0 | 1 | 0 |
| China | 93 | 90 | 3 | 0 |
| France | 4 | 4 | 0 | 0 |
| Germany | 1 | 0 | 1 | 0 |
| India | 5 | 4 | 1 | 0 |
| Iran | 1 | 0 | 1 | 0 |
| Israel | 1 | 1 | 0 | 0 |
| Italy | 3 | 3 | 0 | 0 |
| Japan | 4 | 3 | 1 | 0 |
| Russia | 17 | 17 | 0 | 0 |
| South Korea | 2 | 1 | 1 | 0 |
| United States | 198 (Note: Includes Electron launches from Māhia) | 194 | 4 | 0 |
| World | 330 | 317 | 13 | 0 |

=== By rocket ===
- Angara-1.2
- Angara A5
- Ariane 6
- Atlas V
- Ceres-1
- Electron
- Falcon 9 new
- Falcon 9 reused
- H-IIA
- H3
- GSLV
- LVM3
- PSLV
- Jielong 3
- Kinetica 1
- Kuaizhou 1A
- Kuaizhou 11
- Long March 2
- Long March 3
- Long March 4
- Long March 5
- Long March 6
- Long March 7
- Long March 8
- Long March 11
- Long March 12
- Soyuz-2
- Soyuz 2.1v
- Starship
- New Glenn
- Vega C
- Zhuque-2
- Others

==== By family ====
| Family | Country | Launches | Successes | Failures | Partial failures | Remarks |
|---|---|---|---|---|---|---|
| Alpha | United States | 1 | 0 | 1 | 0 | |
| Angara | Russia | 4 | 4 | 0 | 0 | |
| Ariane | France | 4 | 4 | 0 | 0 | |
| Atlas | United States | 5 | 5 | 0 | 0 | |
| Ceres | China | 6 | 5 | 1 | 0 | |
| Electron | United States | 18 | 18 | 0 | 0 | |
| Eris | Australia | 1 | 0 | 1 | 0 | Maiden flight |
| Falcon | United States | 165 | 165 | 0 | 0 | |
| Gravity | China | 1 | 1 | 0 | 0 | |
| H-series | Japan | 4 | 3 | 1 | 0 | |
| HANBIT-Nano | South Korea | 1 | 0 | 1 | 0 | Maiden flight |
| Hyperbola | China | 1 | 1 | 0 | 0 | |
| ILV | India | 5 | 4 | 1 | 0 | |
| Jielong | China | 4 | 4 | 0 | 0 | |
| Kinetica | China | 5 | 5 | 0 | 0 | |
| Kuaizhou | China | 4 | 3 | 1 | 0 | |
| Long March | China | 69 | 69 | 0 | 0 | |
| Minotaur | United States | 1 | 1 | 0 | 0 | |
| New Glenn | United States | 2 | 2 | 0 | 0 | Maiden flight |
| Nuri | South Korea | 1 | 1 | 0 | 0 | |
| R-7 | Russia | 13 | 13 | 0 | 0 | |
| Shavit | Israel | 1 | 1 | 0 | 0 | |
| Spectrum | Germany | 1 | 0 | 1 | 0 | Maiden flight |
| Starship | United States | 5 | 2 | 3 | 0 | |
| Vega C | Italy | 3 | 3 | 0 | 0 | |
| Vulcan | United States | 1 | 1 | 0 | 0 | |
| Zhuque | China | 3 | 2 | 1 | 0 | |
| Zuljanah | Iran | 1 | 0 | 1 | 0 | Unclear whether it was an orbital or suborbital attempt. |

==== By type ====
| Rocket | Country | Family | Launches | Successes | Failures | Partial failures | Remarks |
|---|---|---|---|---|---|---|---|
| Alpha | United States | Alpha | 1 | 0 | 1 | 0 | |
| Angara-1.2 | Russia | Angara | 3 | 3 | 0 | 0 | |
| Angara A5 | Russia | Angara | 1 | 1 | 0 | 0 | |
| Ariane 6 | France | Ariane | 4 | 4 | 0 | 0 | |
| Atlas V | United States | Atlas | 5 | 5 | 0 | 0 | |
| Ceres-1 | China | Ceres | 6 | 5 | 1 | 0 | |
| Electron | United States | Electron | 18 | 18 | 0 | 0 | |
| Eris-1 | Australia | Eris | 1 | 0 | 1 | 0 | Maiden flight |
| Falcon 9 | United States | Falcon | 165 | 165 | 0 | 0 | |
| GSLV | India | ILV | 2 | 2 | 0 | 0 | |
| Gravity-1 | China | Gravity | 1 | 1 | 0 | 0 | |
| H-IIA | Japan | H-series | 1 | 1 | 0 | 0 | Final flight |
| H3 | Japan | H-series | 3 | 2 | 1 | 0 | |
| HANBIT-Nano | South Korea | HANBIT-Nano | 1 | 0 | 1 | 0 | Maiden flight |
| Hyperbola-1 | China | Hyperbola | 1 | 1 | 0 | 0 | |
| Jielong 3 | China | Jielong | 4 | 4 | 0 | 0 | |
| Kinetica 1 | China | Kinetica | 5 | 5 | 0 | 0 | |
| Kuaizhou 1 | China | Kuaizhou | 3 | 2 | 1 | 0 | |
| Kuaizhou 11 | China | Kuaizhou | 1 | 1 | 0 | 0 | |
| Long March 2 | China | Long March | 13 | 13 | 0 | 0 | |
| Long March 3 | China | Long March | 15 | 15 | 0 | 0 | |
| Long March 4 | China | Long March | 7 | 7 | 0 | 0 | |
| Long March 5 | China | Long March | 4 | 4 | 0 | 0 | |
| Long March 6 | China | Long March | 11 | 11 | 0 | 0 | |
| Long March 7 | China | Long March | 7 | 7 | 0 | 0 | |
| Long March 8 | China | Long March | 7 | 7 | 0 | 0 | |
| Long March 11 | China | Long March | 1 | 1 | 0 | 0 | |
| Long March 12 | China | Long March | 4 | 4 | 0 | 0 | |
| LVM3 | India | ILV | 2 | 2 | 0 | 0 | |
| Minotaur IV | United States | Minotaur | 1 | 1 | 0 | 0 | |
| New Glenn | United States | New Glenn | 2 | 2 | 0 | 0 | Maiden flight |
| Nuri | South Korea | Nuri | 1 | 1 | 0 | 0 | |
| PSLV | India | ILV | 1 | 0 | 1 | 0 | |
| Shavit 2 | Israel | Shavit | 1 | 1 | 0 | 0 | |
| Soyuz-2 | Russia | R-7 | 13 | 13 | 0 | 0 | |
| Spectrum | Germany | Spectrum | 1 | 0 | 1 | 0 | Maiden flight |
| Starship | United States | Starship | 5 | 2 | 3 | 0 | |
| Vega C | Italy | Vega | 3 | 3 | 0 | 0 | |
| Vulcan Centaur | United States | Vulcan | 1 | 1 | 0 | 0 | |
| Zhuque-2 | China | Zhuque | 2 | 1 | 1 | 0 | |
| Zhuque-3 | China | Zhuque | 1 | 1 | 0 | 0 | Maiden flight |
| Zuljanah | Iran | Zuljanah | 1 | 0 | 1 | 0 | Unclear whether it was an orbital or suborbital attempt. |

==== By configuration ====
| Rocket | Country | Type | Launches | Successes | Failures | Partial failures | Remarks |
|---|---|---|---|---|---|---|---|
| Alpha | United States | Alpha | 1 | 0 | 1 | 0 | |
| Angara-1.2 | Russia | Angara-1.2 | 3 | 3 | 0 | 0 | |
| Angara A5 / Briz-M | Russia | Angara A5 | 1 | 1 | 0 | 0 | |
| Ariane 62 | France | Ariane 6 | 4 | 4 | 0 | 0 | |
| Atlas V 551 | United States | Atlas V | 5 | 5 | 0 | 0 | |
| Ceres-1 | China | Ceres-1 | 5 | 4 | 1 | 0 | |
| Ceres-1S | China | Ceres-1 | 1 | 1 | 0 | 0 | |
| Electron | United States | Electron | 18 | 18 | 0 | 0 | |
| Eris-1 | Australia | Eris-1 | 1 | 0 | 1 | 0 | Maiden flight |
| Falcon 9 Block 5 | United States | Falcon 9 | 165 | 165 | 0 | 0 | |
| GSLV Mk II | India | GSLV | 2 | 2 | 0 | 0 | |
| Gravity-1 | China | Gravity-1 | 1 | 1 | 0 | 0 | |
| H-IIA 202 | Japan | H-IIA | 1 | 1 | 0 | 0 | Final flight |
| H3-22S | Japan | H3 | 2 | 1 | 1 | 0 | |
| H3-24W | Japan | H3 | 1 | 1 | 0 | 0 | Maiden flight |
| HANBIT-Nano | South Korea | HANBIT-Nano | 1 | 0 | 1 | 0 | Maiden flight |
| Hyperbola-1 | China | Hyperbola | 1 | 1 | 0 | 0 | |
| Jielong 3 | China | Jielong 3 | 4 | 4 | 0 | 0 | |
| Kinetica 1 | China | Kinetica 1 | 5 | 5 | 0 | 0 | |
| Kuaizhou 1A | China | Kuaizhou 1 | 2 | 1 | 1 | 0 | |
| Kuaizhou 1A Pro | China | Kuaizhou 1 | 1 | 1 | 0 | 0 | |
| Kuaizhou 11 | China | Kuaizhou 11 | 1 | 1 | 0 | 0 | |
| Long March 2C | China | Long March 2 | 2 | 2 | 0 | 0 | |
| Long March 2C / YZ-1S | China | Long March 2 | 1 | 1 | 0 | 0 | |
| Long March 2D | China | Long March 2 | 7 | 7 | 0 | 0 | |
| Long March 2F/G | China | Long March 2 | 3 | 3 | 0 | 0 | |
| Long March 3B/E | China | Long March 3 | 13 | 13 | 0 | 0 | |
| Long March 3C/E | China | Long March 3 | 1 | 1 | 0 | 0 | |
| Long March 3C/E / YZ-1 | China | Long March 3 | 1 | 1 | 0 | 0 | |
| Long March 4B | China | Long March 4 | 4 | 4 | 0 | 0 | |
| Long March 4C | China | Long March 4 | 3 | 3 | 0 | 0 | |
| Long March 5 | China | Long March 5 | 2 | 2 | 0 | 0 | |
| Long March 5B / YZ-2 | China | Long March 5 | 2 | 2 | 0 | 0 | |
| Long March 6 | China | Long March 6 | 1 | 1 | 0 | 0 | |
| Long March 6A | China | Long March 6 | 10 | 10 | 0 | 0 | |
| Long March 7 | China | Long March 7 | 1 | 1 | 0 | 0 | |
| Long March 7A | China | Long March 7 | 6 | 6 | 0 | 0 | |
| Long March 8 | China | Long March 8 | 1 | 1 | 0 | 0 | |
| Long March 8A | China | Long March 8 | 6 | 6 | 0 | 0 | Maiden flight |
| Long March 11H | China | Long March 11 | 1 | 1 | 0 | 0 | |
| Long March 12 | China | Long March 12 | 3 | 3 | 0 | 0 | |
| Long March 12A | China | Long March 12 | 1 | 1 | 0 | 0 | |
| LVM3 | India | LVM 3 | 2 | 2 | 0 | 0 | |
| Minotaur IV | United States | Minotaur IV | 1 | 1 | 0 | 0 | |
| New Glenn 7×2 | United States | New Glenn | 2 | 2 | 0 | 0 | Maiden flight |
| Nuri | South Korea | Nuri | 1 | 1 | 0 | 0 | |
| PSLV-XL | India | PSLV | 1 | 0 | 1 | 0 | |
| Shavit 2 | Israel | Shavit 2 | 1 | 1 | 0 | 0 | |
| Soyuz-2.1a | Russia | Soyuz-2 | 6 | 6 | 0 | 0 | |
| Soyuz-2.1b | Russia | Soyuz-2 | 1 | 1 | 0 | 0 | |
| Soyuz-2.1b / Fregat-M | Russia | Soyuz-2 | 5 | 5 | 0 | 0 | |
| Soyuz 2.1v / Volga | Russia | Soyuz-2 | 1 | 1 | 0 | 0 | Final flight |
| Spectrum | Germany | Spectrum | 1 | 0 | 1 | 0 | Maiden flight |
| Starship Block 2 | United States | Starship | 5 | 2 | 3 | 0 | Maiden flight |
| Vega C | Italy | Vega C | 3 | 3 | 0 | 0 | |
| Vulcan Centaur VC4S | United States | Vulcan Centaur | 1 | 1 | 0 | 0 | Maiden flight |
| Zhuque-2E | China | Zhuque-2 | 2 | 1 | 1 | 0 | |
| Zhuque-3 | China | Zhuque-3 | 1 | 1 | 0 | 0 | maiden flight |
| Zuljanah | Iran | Zuljanah | 1 | 0 | 1 | 0 | Unclear whether it was an orbital or suborbital attempt. |

=== By spaceport ===
- Bowen
- Alcântara
- Jiuquan
- Taiyuan
- Wenchang
- Xichang
- Yellow Sea
- Kourou
- Satish Dhawan
- Semnan
- Palmachim
- Tanegashima
- Baikonur
- Māhia
- Andøya
- Plesetsk
- Vostochny
- Naro
- Cape Canaveral
- Kennedy
- MARS
- Starbase
- Vandenberg

| Site | Country | Launches | Successes | Failures | Partial failures | Remarks |
|---|---|---|---|---|---|---|
| Alcântara | Brazil | 1 | 0 | 1 | 0 | |
| Andøya | Norway | 1 | 0 | 1 | 0 | First orbital launch |
| Baikonur | Kazakhstan | 6 | 6 | 0 | 0 | |
| Bowen | Australia | 1 | 0 | 1 | 0 | First launch |
| Cape Canaveral | United States | 82 | 82 | 0 | 0 | |
| Jiuquan | China | 34 | 31 | 3 | 0 | |
| Kennedy | United States | 27 | 27 | 0 | 0 | |
| Kourou | France | 7 | 7 | 0 | 0 | |
| Māhia | New Zealand | 17 | 17 | 0 | 0 | |
| MARS | United States | 1 | 1 | 0 | 0 | |
| Naro | South Korea | 1 | 1 | 0 | 0 | |
| Palmachim | Israel | 1 | 1 | 0 | 0 | |
| Plesetsk | Russia | 9 | 9 | 0 | 0 | |
| Satish Dhawan | India | 5 | 4 | 1 | 0 | |
| Semnan | Iran | 1 | 0 | 1 | 0 | |
| Starbase | United States | 5 | 2 | 3 | 0 | |
| Taiyuan | China | 12 | 12 | 0 | 0 | |
| Tanegashima | Japan | 4 | 3 | 1 | 0 | |
| Vandenberg | United States | 66 | 65 | 1 | 0 | |
| Vostochny | Russia | 2 | 2 | 0 | 0 | |
| Wenchang | China | 21 | 21 | 0 | 0 | |
| Xichang | China | 19 | 19 | 0 | 0 | |
| Yellow Sea | China | 7 | 7 | 0 | 0 | |
| Total | | 330 | 317 | 13 | 0 | |

=== By orbit ===
- Transatmospheric
- Low Earth
- Low Earth (ISS)
- Low Earth (CSS)
- Low Earth (SSO)
- Low Earth (polar)
- Low Earth (retrograde)
- Medium Earth
- Molniya
- Geosynchronous
- Lunar transfer
- Heliocentric

| Orbital regime | Launches | Achieved | Not achieved | Accidentally achieved | Remarks |
|---|---|---|---|---|---|
| Transatmospheric | 5 | 2 | 3 | 0 | |
| Low Earth / Sun-synchronous | 278 | 269 | 9 | 0 | Including flights to ISS and Tiangong (CSS) |
| Geosynchronous / Tundra / GTO | 34 | 33 | 1 | 0 | |
| Medium Earth / Molniya | 8 | 8 | 0 | 0 | |
| High Earth / Lunar transfer | 2 | 2 | 0 | 0 | |
| Heliocentric orbit / Planetary transfer | 3 | 3 | 0 | 0 | |
| Total | 330 | 317 | 13 | 0 | |

== Suborbital launch statistics ==
=== By country ===
For the purposes of this section, the yearly tally of suborbital launches by country assigns each flight to the country of origin of the rocket, not to the launch services provider or the spaceport. Flights intended to fly below 80 km (50 mi) are omitted. This includes suborbital flights for all purposes, including scientific and military application.

| Country | Launches | Successes | Failures | Partial failures |
|---|---|---|---|---|
| Canada | 4 | 3 | 1 | 0 |
| Iran | 698 (Note: From the Twelve-Day War) | 698 | 0 | 0 |
| Japan | 1 | 1 | 0 | 0 |
| Netherlands | 1 | 1 | 0 | 0 |
| New Zealand | 1 | 1 | 0 | 0 |
| North Korea | 2 | 2 | 0 | 0 |
| Taiwan | 1 | 0 | 1 | 0 |
| United States | 22 | 22 | 0 | 0 |
| Yemen | 8 | 8 | 0 | 0 |
| World | 738 | 736 | 2 | 0 |

== Maiden flights ==
| Rocket | Origin | Organization | Reusable | Launch | Outcome | Ref. |
|---|---|---|---|---|---|---|
| New Glenn 7×2 | United States | Blue Origin | First stage | 16 January | Success | |
| Starship Block 2 | United States | SpaceX | First stage | 16 January | Failure (Note: Later in the year, Starship Block 2 achieved the planned transatmospheric orbit and deployed mock-ups of Starlink V3 satellites.) | |
| Long March 8A | China | China Academy of Launch Vehicle Technology | —N/a | 11 February | Success | |
| Spectrum | Germany | Isar Aerospace | —N/a | 30 March | Failure | |
| Eris Block 1 | Australia | Gilmour Space Technologies | —N/a | 29 July | Failure | |
| Vulcan Centaur VC4S | United States | ULA | —N/a | 13 August | Success | |
| H3-24W | Japan | JAXA/MHI | —N/a | 26 October | Success | |
| Zhuque-3 | China | LandSpace | First stage | 3 December | Success | |
| HANBIT-Nano | South Korea | Innospace | —N/a | 23 December | Failure | |
| Long March 12A | China | Shanghai Academy of Spaceflight Technology | First stage | 23 December | Success | |
