= Comunidade Quilombola de Itamatatiua =

The Quilombola Community of Itamatatiua is a quilombo remnant community, a traditional Brazilian population, located in the Brazilian municipality of Alcântara, Maranhão, Brazil. The community was certified as a quilombo remnant by the Palmares Cultural Foundation through Ordinance No. 08/2006, of May 12, 2006.

== Certification ==
The community was certified as a quilombo remnant by the Palmares Cultural Foundation through Ordinance No. 08, of May 12, 2006, published in the Official Gazette of the Union. This certification guarantees the recognition of the community's ethnic and cultural identity, in addition to enabling access to specific public policies, such as education, health, and programs to promote traditional production. Certification is also an essential step in the land regularization process of the traditional quilombo territory. However, although the community has an open process at the National Institute for Colonization and Agrarian Reform (INCRA), the definitive land titling has not yet been completed.

In 2005, the Quilombola communities of Alcântara filed complaints with the Inter-American Commission on Human Rights of the OAS for racial discrimination and violations of territorial rights resulting from the installation of the Alcântara Launch Center (CLA). The case progressed to the Inter-American Court of Human Rights (IACHR), and in April 2023, the Brazilian State was found guilty of systematic human rights violations against the Quilombola communities surrounding the Alcântara Launch Center (CLA) in the municipality of Alcântara. This was the first time the Brazilian State had been tried in a case involving Quilombola communities and the first time the Brazilian Armed Forces had been confronted in an international court. During this trial, the Brazilian State formally acknowledged the violation of the rights of the Quilombola communities, issued a public apology, and committed to repairing the damage caused, including the titling of the lands. In September 2024, the federal government delivered land titles to these communities as part of fulfilling this agreement.

The lack of land title (land regularization) creates difficulties for quilombola communities in requesting social and urban policies to improve living conditions, such as urban infrastructure for energy, water and sewage networks.

== Tradition and history ==
The community is located about 60 km from the municipal seat of Alcântara. Recognized for its rich Afro-Indigenous heritage, the community preserves ancestral traditions, with emphasis on the artisanal production of ceramics, practiced for more than three centuries. This activity represents not only an important source of economic sustenance, but also a central element of local cultural identity, functioning as a link between generations and an expression of the historical resistance of the quilombo.

A phenomenological study highlights the importance of natural elements, especially clay, in the local ceramic process. These components of geodiversity are appropriated by the artisans, becoming incorporated into the material culture, community identity and historical resistance.

The ceramics of Itamatatiua have been highlighted in local cultural initiatives. On August 14, 2024, it was announced that the Alcântara Museum, through the project "Alcântara: From Dinosaurs to the Space Age", developed by the Federal University of Maranhão in partnership with the Alcântara Museum and the Sousândrade Foundation, would begin exhibiting objects produced by the community. The action aims to illustrate the development of Alcântara through its crafts, culture, tradition and innovation.

The handicrafts practiced in Itamatatiua are the result of accumulated knowledge passed down through generations. The artisans of the community possess tacit knowledge about techniques for extracting, preparing, and shaping natural raw materials, transforming them into artifacts that express values, worldviews, and their own cultural identities. Due to this cultural and economic value, funding and research institutions have promoted actions to ensure the continuity of these traditional practices. In this context, design has acted as a tool to support product development and the appreciation of Brazilian handicrafts. However, such interventions require sensitive and respectful approaches, as there are real risks of product distortion and the distortion of local culture if the autonomy, knowledge, and sociocultural contexts of the communities involved are not taken into account.

== The Children of Saint Teresa ==
Itamatatiua stands out in the fight for cultural preservation, and being a region far from the city of Alcântara, it has very specific customs and beliefs within the community, such as devotion to Saint Teresa of Ávila, thus the people call themselves children of Saint Teresa.

The belief in and devotion to Saint Teresa of Ávila is part of the life of this community; these lands belonged to the Carmelite Order. Saint Teresa of Ávila is a saint of devotion for the Carmelite Order, known as Saint Teresa of Jesus.

The story goes that a black couple received the land as a donation, and this is confirmed by the land ownership record, which is carved into a stone and kept by the former residents.

Oral accounts state that devotion to Saint Teresa of Ávila has been present since ancient times. They recount that the Saint's image was found in the Chora Well and from then on began to manifest itself through dreams, indicating where and how she wanted her church to be built. The community attributes many miracles to the Saint and considers her the protector of the territory where the community is located.

== Quilombola Museum of Itamatatiua ==
In October 2025, the Quilombola Museum of Itamatatiua was inaugurated in Alcântara. The result of a joint effort between the Federal University of Maranhão (UFMA) and the Itamatatiua Women's Association, the space highlights the traditional work carried out by the community's ceramists at the Itamatatiua Ceramic Production Center, tells the story of the centuries-old method of ceramic production, and provides information about the history of the quilombola community.
