= Innospace HANBIT-TLV =

Test launch vehicle manufactured by Innospace

HANBIT-TLV
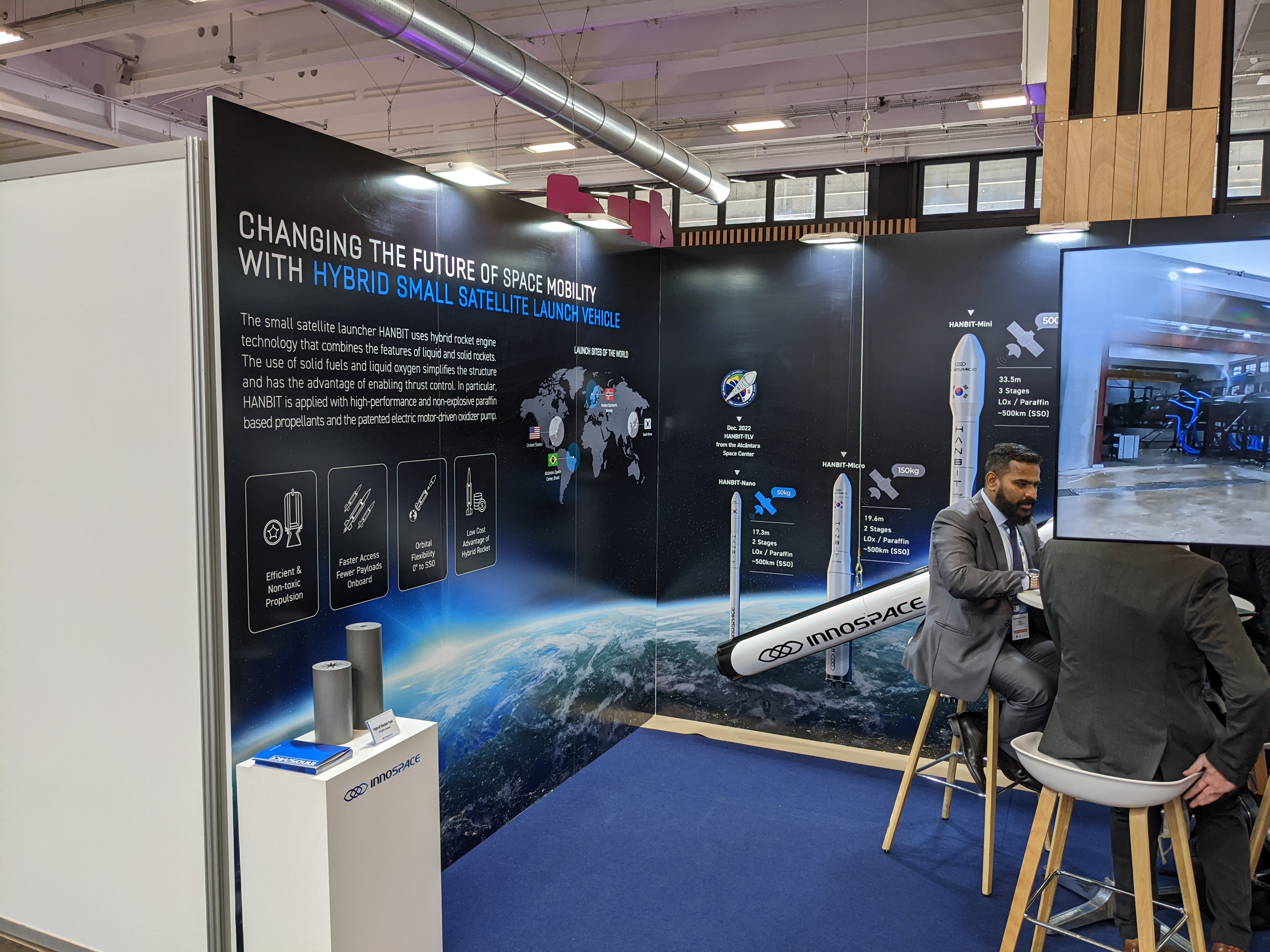
- HANBIT-TLV (International Astronautical Congress, 2022)
- Function: Launch vehicle
- Manufacturer: Innospace
- Country of origin: South Korea

Size
- Height: 16.3 m (53 ft)
- Diameter: 1 m (3 ft 3 in)
- Mass: 9,200 kg (20,300 lb)
- Stages: 1

Launch history
- Status: Launch completed
- Launch sites: Alcantara Space Center
- First flight: 19 March 2023

HANBIT-TLV (Korean: 한빛-TLV) is a suborbital test launch vehicle manufactured by Innospace, a private space startup company in South Korea. With its launch on March 19, 2023, it became the first test launch vehicle launched by the country's private company.

== History ==
On December 16, 2022, Innospace announced that the launch date of the independently developed engine verification test launch vehicle HANBIT-TLV was set for December 19, 2022 at 6:00 p.m. KST. The launch site is the Alcântara Space Center in Brazil.

However, due to weather issues, it was postponed and the launch was decided to be held on December 20 at 6:00 a.m. BRT.

HANBIT-TLV was launched at 2:52 p.m. BRT on March 19, 2023, from the Alcantara Space Center. After ignition on its own launch pad, it burned stably for 106 seconds, flew normally for 4 minutes and 33 seconds, and then landed normally within the safety zone set in the Brazilian sea. As a result of the final analysis of flight performance analysis data such as combustion chamber pressure, electric pump output, control system operation, flight trajectory, and attitude measured during the flight, it was finally confirmed that the engine operated normally and maintained thrust stability during the flight.

The HANBIT-TLV carried the SISNAV (Sistema de Navegação Inercial) inertial navigation system as a payload for the Brazilian Air Force. It was confirmed that SISNAV successfully completed its mission by obtaining flight environment operation performance data.

=== Plan ===
The launch of the two-stage small satellite launch vehicle HANBIT-NANO with a payload transport capacity of 50kg in 2023 is scheduled for March 2025.

== Design ==
It is a single-stage test launch vehicle developed for the purpose of developing flight performance verification of a 15-ton thrust hybrid engine. The hybrid engine independently developed by Innospace is an engine that combines the strengths of solid and liquid rockets. It uses solid fuel Paraffin wax and oxidizing agent (LOx) as propellants (fuel), making it simple in structure and capable of thrust control.

== See also ==
- Small satellite
