= HANBIT-NANO flight 1 =

Inaugural launch of the HANBIT-Nano rocket

Innospace HANBIT-NANO launch
- Launch: 21 December 2025, 10:13 p.m. UTC-3
- Operator: Innospace
- Pad: Alcântara Launch Center Innospace Pad
- Payload: (Brazil) FloripaSat-2A / 2B; (Brazil) Jussara-K; (India) Solaras S2; (Brazil) PION-BR2
- Outcome: Failure
- Launch duration: 33 seconds

HANBIT-NANO Flights

Innospace HANBIT-NANO Flight 1 (Spaceward) was the launch of Innospace HANBIT-NANO, by Innospace with the goal of launching 8 different payloads, between satellites and experiments, to low Earth orbit.

The launch happened on 22 December 2025, with a failure 33 seconds after T-0, destroying the rocket.

== Backstory ==
The HANBIT-Nano rocket underwent Integrated Interface System Testing in early 2025; it is scheduled to be shipped to the Alcântara Center on April 2, with a launch planned for July 2025. However, upon receiving authorization from the Brazilian Space Agency in May 2025, with a launch window scheduled for between October 13 and November 7, the newspaper O Globo reported that they did not have had a launch date. On May 27, Innospace announced that the launch had been rescheduled from July to the second half of 2025 due to issues with the electric pump and the first-stage hybrid propulsion system.

On 10 November, the integration of the payload—consisting of eight payloads, including five satellites and three experiments—began, with the launch scheduled for the 22nd, at 3 p.m. UTC-3, when the rocket would place its payloads into an orbit 300 km above the Earth's surface with an inclination of 40 degrees. Operation Spaceward mobilized 400 Brazilian Air Force personnel. In order to conduct additional safety tests, on 21 November the launch window was extended to 22 December, with the launch now scheduled for the 17th. On December 15, preparations reached their final stage, and the launch was scheduled for 3:45 p.m. UTC-3 on the 17th. On the 17th, the launch was rescheduled for the 19th due to an anomaly "detected in the cooling system of the first-stage oxidizer supply system." On the 19th, the launch was postponed from 3:34 p.m. UTC-3 to 5:00 p.m. UTC-3 and then to 9:30 p.m. UTC-3 due to weather conditions at Alcântara, facing yet another delay due to a problem with the second-stage fuel valve, and was then rescheduled for 22 December.

== Launch ==
On December 22, at 10:13 p.m. UTC−3, the HANBIT-Nano successfully launched from the base, breaking the sound barrier and passing the point of maximum aerodynamic pressure, before being destroyed approximately 33 seconds later. The Brazilian Air Force reported that "After leaving the launch pad, the vehicle began its vertical trajectory as planned. However, there was a malfunction in the vehicle that caused it to crash into the ground" within the space base area. The investigation into the accident began on 26 January 2026.

Kim Soo-jong, CEO of Innospace, revealed to shareholders the results of the investigation involving Innospace, the CENIPA, the Brazilian Air Force, the Alcântara Space Center and independent investigators, who, in addition to analyzing the telemetry data, recovered and examined 300 pieces of debris. It was discovered that during the structural reinforcement process in Brazil, insufficient compression of the first-stage engine sealing components caused a gas leak, which ruptured 33 seconds into the flight. In a letter, Kim Soo-Jong expressed regret over the loss and indicated that a new launch would take place in 2026. CENIPA's final report was released on June 12.

== See also ==
- VLS-1 V01
- List of Brazilian satellites
- Brazil–South Korea relations

== Report ==
- CENIPA (2026). Final report (PDF).
