= FTB =

FTB may refer to:

== Banks ==
- Finance Trust Bank, in Uganda

== Entertainment ==
- Flower Travellin' Band, a Japanese rock band
- From the Bench Digital Entertainment, a Spanish video game developer
- Fukui Television Broadcasting, a Japanese TV station

== Other uses ==
- California Franchise Tax Board, collects income tax
- Canon FTb, a camera
- Fédération des travailleurs de Burundi, a trade union
- First-time buyer of residential property
- FT Braunschweig, a German football club
- FTB, a Brazilian research rocket made by Fogtrein
