= 14-XS =

2021 Brazilian Air Force mission

- Mission type: Sub-orbital spaceflight Technological demonstrator
- Operator: Brazilian Air Force
- Range: 200 km (120 mi)
- Apogee: 160 km (99 mi)

Spacecraft properties
- Spacecraft: 14-X (scramjet engine)
- Manufacturer: Orbital Engenharia

Start of mission
- Launch date: 14 December 2021
- Rocket: VSB-30 V32
- Launch site: Alcântara Space Center
- Contractor: Brazilian Air Force

End of mission
- Destroyed: Ocean Atlantic
- Landing date: 14 December 2021
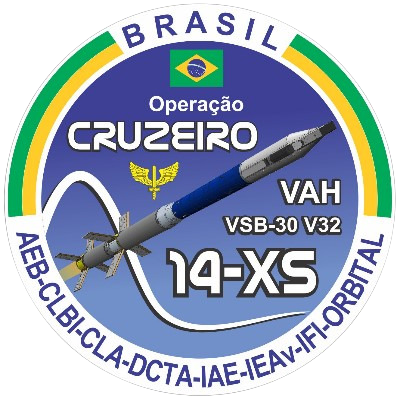
- 14-X

14-XS was an Operação Cruzeiro mission conducted by the Brazilian Air Force at the Alcantara Launch Center on December 14, 2021.

== Mission ==
The flight was a test to demonstrate scramjet technology. The device was launched by a Hypersonic Accelerator Vehicle (based on the VSB-30 rocket) and accelerated to Mach 6 to an altitude of 30 kilometers, from where it continued until it reached a suborbital apogee at an altitude of 160 kilometers and 200 kilometers down range from the launch site, impacting at the Atlantic Ocean. The model tested combustion in a hypersonic environment and Mach 6 speed was reached at 50 km.

Both the Alcântara Launch Center and the Barreira do Inferno Launch Center acted as tracking stations. The vehicle was the first with a scramjet engine built in Brazil and reached up to 5,000 hp. The vehicle was built by Orbital Engenharia.

Both the rocket and the 14-X were built in São José dos Campos. The engine has been under development since 2008, with the goal of enabling the Brazilian industry to develop aerospace experiments.

== See also ==
- 14-X
- Brazilian space program
