= Alcântara, Maranhão =

Alcântara
- Municipality
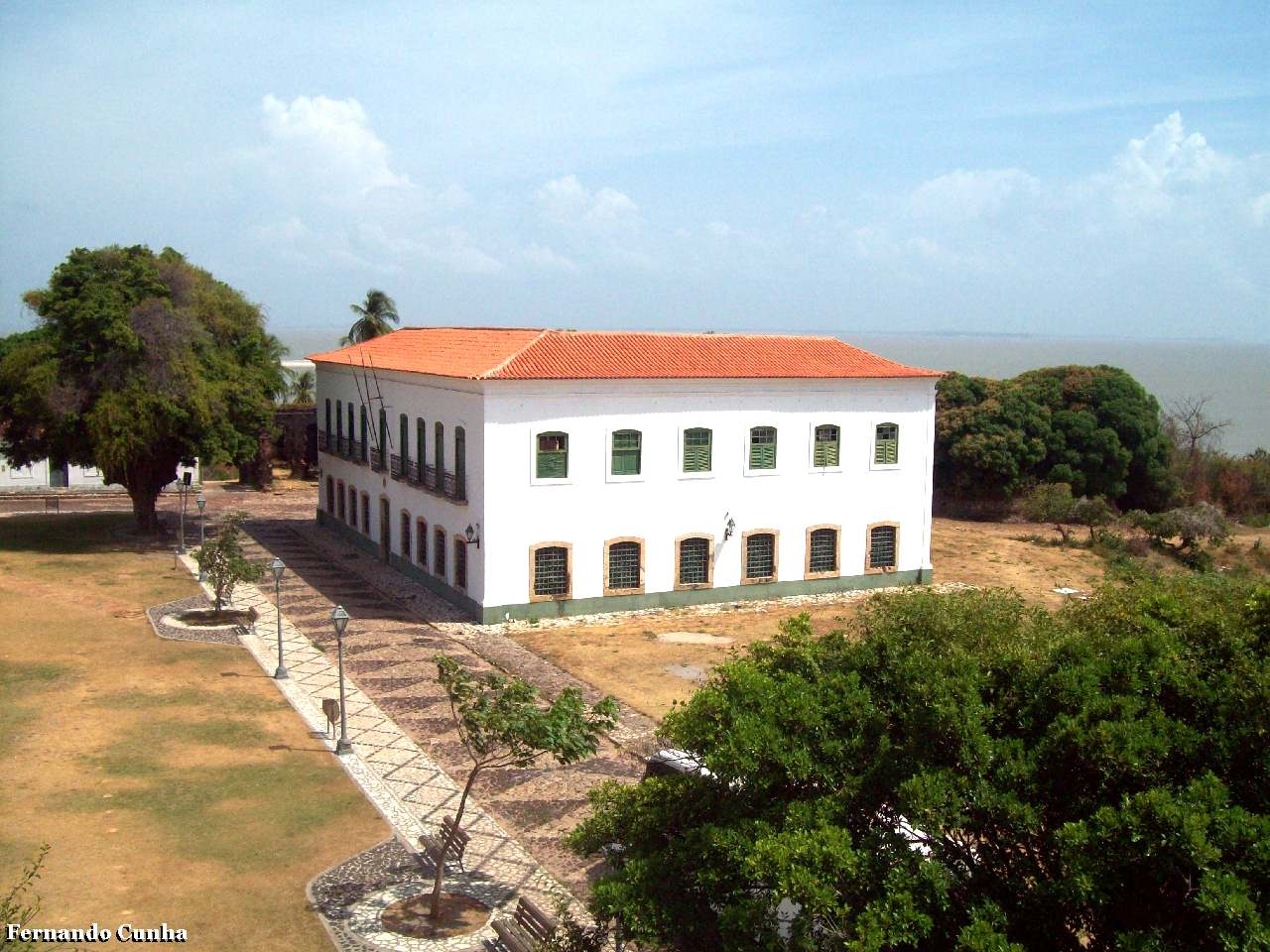
- Alcântara government building

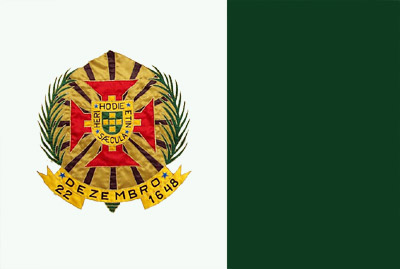
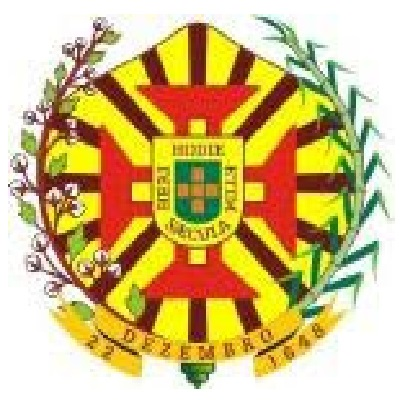
- Flag Coat of arms

- Location in Maranhão state

- Location in Brazil
- Coordinates: 02°24′32″S 44°24′54″W
- Country: Brazil
- Region: Northeast
- State: Maranhão

Area
  - Total: 1,458 km^{2} (563 sq mi)

Population (2020)
  - Total: 22,112
  - Density: 15.17/km^{2} (39.28/sq mi)
- Time zone: UTC−3 (BRT)
- Postal code: 65250-000
- Area code: +55 98

National Historic Heritage of Brazil
- Designated: 1948
- Reference no.: 390

Alcântara is a Brazilian municipality in the state of Maranhão. The municipality has a population of 22,112 (2020) and an area of 1,458 square kilometres (563 mi^{2}). The municipality is 30 kilometres (19 mi) away from the state capital of Maranhão, São Luís, directly across the Bay of São Marcos.

== History ==
The region of present-day Alcântara was the site of a cluster of Tupinambá villages, the main one being known by the name of Tapuitapera. The French arrived in Maranhão in 1612, led by Daniel de La Touche, Lord of La Lavadière, and established relations with these villages. The French built the first chapel in Tapuitapera.

The Portuguese defeated the French in the Battle of Guaxenduba in the Bay of São José in November 1614, and troops of the Captaincy of Pernambuco commanded by Alexandre de Moura subsequently expelled the French from Maranhão in 1615. The Portuguese began the process of colonizing the region of Alcântara between 1616 and 1618. With the division of captaincies in the region, Tapuitapera became the seat of the Captaincy of Cumã. The captaincy occupied the region between the mouth of the Mearim, Pindaré, and Turiaçu rivers. The captaincy's first donataries (donatórios) were Antonio Coelho de Carvalho and his grandson Francisco de Albuquerque Coelho de Carvalho.

The Portuguese lost possession of the region as part of the Dutch invasion of 1641 and the town was Tapuitapera was abandoned. With the recapture of the territory by the Portuguese, Tapuitapera was elevated to town status as the Vila de Santo Antônio de Alcântara in 1648. Some sugar and cotton production returned in this period. A town hall, pillory, and parish church were established in the town, all symbols of Portuguese Imperial power.

The Captaincy of Cumã was abolished by Royal Charter in approximately 1754 as part of the wider reincorporating of captaincies donated to the Crown.

== Geography ==
The climate of Alcântara is favorable, characterized by two well-defined seasons: a rainy season from January to June, and a dry season from July to December. The annual average temperature is 26.5 °C, and the wind blows predominantly from the east at an average speed of 12 m/s.

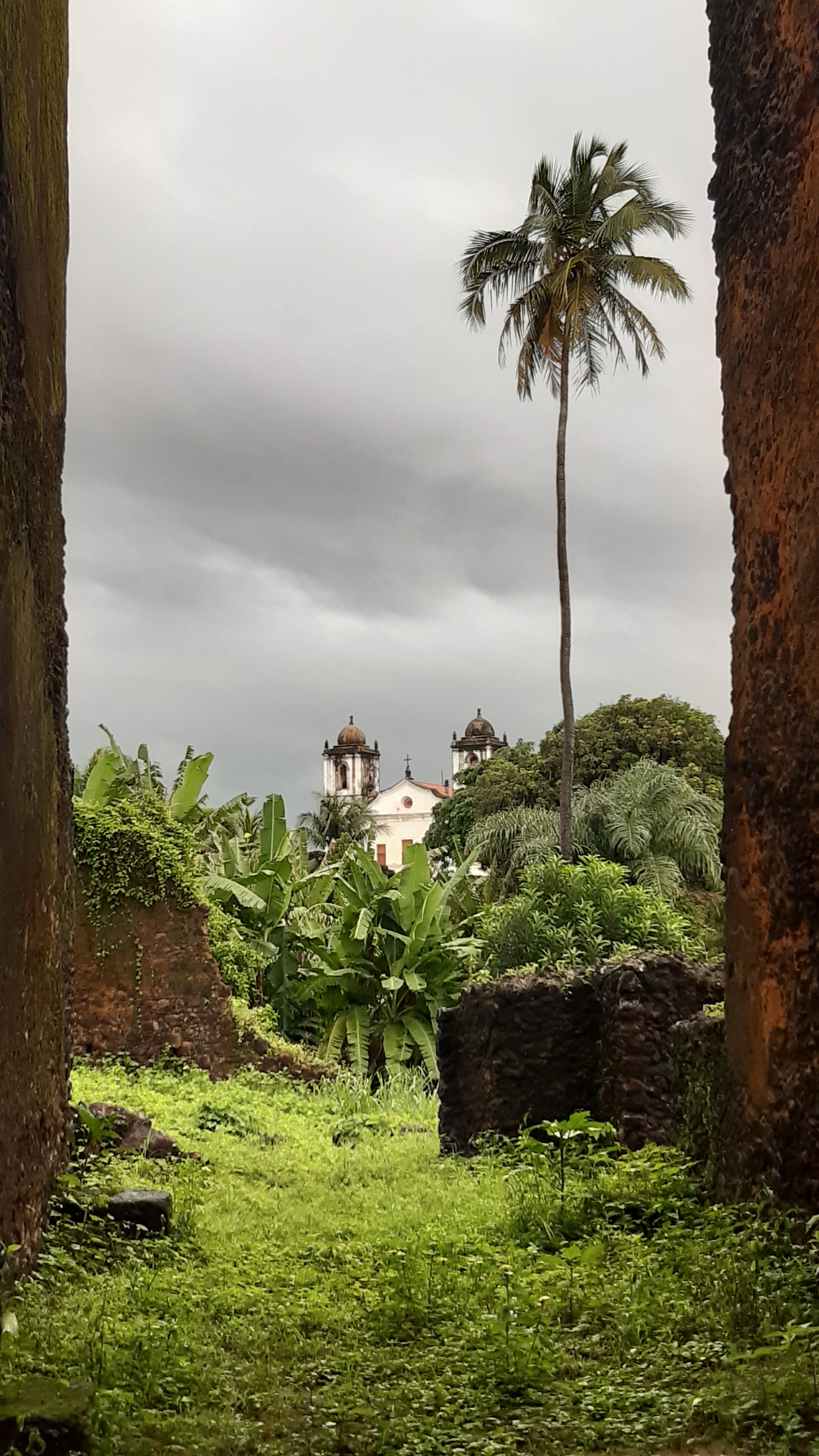
A view of the Igreja e Convento do Carmo (pt) framed by the ruins of Palácio Negro, Alcântara in 2024

The municipality contains a small part of the Baixada Maranhense Environmental Protection Area, a 1,775,035.6-hectare (4,386,208-acre) sustainable use conservation unit created in 1991 that has been a Ramsar Site since 2000.

The town's economy is based mainly on tourism and fishing.

== Historic Center of Alcântara ==
The urban area of Alcântara was listed by the Brazilian federal government in 1948 as the Architectural and Urban Ensemble of Alcântara (Conjunto Arquitetônico e Urbanístico de Alcântara). It covers 140 hectares (350 acres) and includes numerous 18th and 19th century residences, churches, and government buildings. The historic center is noted for its numerous ruins of both built and unbuilt projects. The ruins of the Parish Church of Saint Matthew remains in the Praça da Matriz, the principal public square; only its façade remains. The ruins of numerous unfinished stately town homes are located both on the square and on side streets leading to the square.

== Demography ==
Alcântara is the municipality with the largest number of quilombola communities in Brazil, with more than 200 communities.

With the economic decline, the drop in exports and the shift of production to the valleys of the Itapecuru, Mearim and Pindaré Rivers, land was abandoned by the owners of large farms and by the religious orders of the Carmelite Order, the Jesuits, the Carmelites and the Mercedarians, who also owned land in Alcântara, leading the black population to promote other forms of organization and occupation of the territory.

The expansion of the launch center has become a conflict point for the preponderance of quilombola communities. More than 300 families from 32 communities were forced from their homes during the construction of the launch center in the 1980s, and the federal government pursued plans to expand the center while denying land title to the quilombola communities. In a ceremony on 19 September 2024, Luiz Inácio Lula da Silva signed two ordinances and a decree allocating 78.1 hectares of land in Alcântara to the quilombola communities for titling, a cancellation of the federal government's efforts to seize 12.6 hectares from the quilombolas for the launch center.

In separate litigation brought by quilombola communities, the Inter-American Court of Human Rights ruled against Brazil's federal government and the Brazilian Armed Forces, ruling that the federal government violated the fundamental rights and compromised the “collective life project” of 171 quilombola communities during the installation and operation of the Alcântara military rocket launch base. The court ordered the government to grant title to the 78.1 hectares of traditional territory within three years, pay US$4 million to the residents' associations and carry out further acts of reconciliation with the communities.

== Infrastructure ==
=== Rocket Launch Center ===
The Brazilian Space Agency maintains a launch site near Alcântara.

The Alcântara launch center is located near the historic town of Alcântara, close to the city of Sao Luis, capital of the state of Maranhão. The geographic coordinates are 2°18′S and 44°22′W.

The launch center comprises the Cyclone-4 launch site, under the responsibility of ACS, and a set of facilities under the responsibility of the Brazilian Air Force (FAB), and the Brazilian Space Agency (AEB), which include general infrastructure and dedicated complexes for the launching of the Brazilian Satellite Launch Vehicle (SLV).

The overall infrastructure consists of an airport with a 2,600 meter-long runway, a Command and Control Sector equipped with telemetry, communication, meteorology, radar and electricity supply systems, and an Administrative center with hotels, a hospital and administrative buildings.

The general infrastructure also includes roads, and a project for a seaport which is currently underway.

=== Technical Complex ===
The main components of the Cyclone-4 launch site are the Technical Complex and the Launch Complex. The Satellite Assembly Integration and Testing Building is located in the Technical Complex. This building has clean rooms for receiving, testing, fuelling and satellite integration to the launch vehicle payload unit. This building is connected to the Launch Vehicle Assembly, Integration and Testing Building, where the launch vehicle parts are received and tested, and the entire vehicle assembled. The integration of the payload unit, already with the satellite, to the launch vehicle is performed in this building.

The Launch Complex receives the Cyclone-4 launch vehicle horizontally by a railway that connects the launch complex to the technical complex. The launch vehicle is tilted to the vertical position, and the final tests are performed automatically. The launch complex is designed so that the launch vehicle fuelling and launching are performed automatically, thus allowing a safe and reliable operation.

On August 22, 2003, an accident occurred when a VLS-1 rocket accidentally exploded, killing 21 Brazilian technicians.

== Notable people ==
- Helton da Silva Arruda (born 1978), Brazilian professional footballer (goalkeeper)
- Antônio Pedro da Costa Ferreira, Baron of Pindaré (1778–1860), Brazilian politician, lawyer and nobleman
