= Alexey Zubritsky =

Russian cosmonaut (born 1992)

- Алексей Зубрицкий
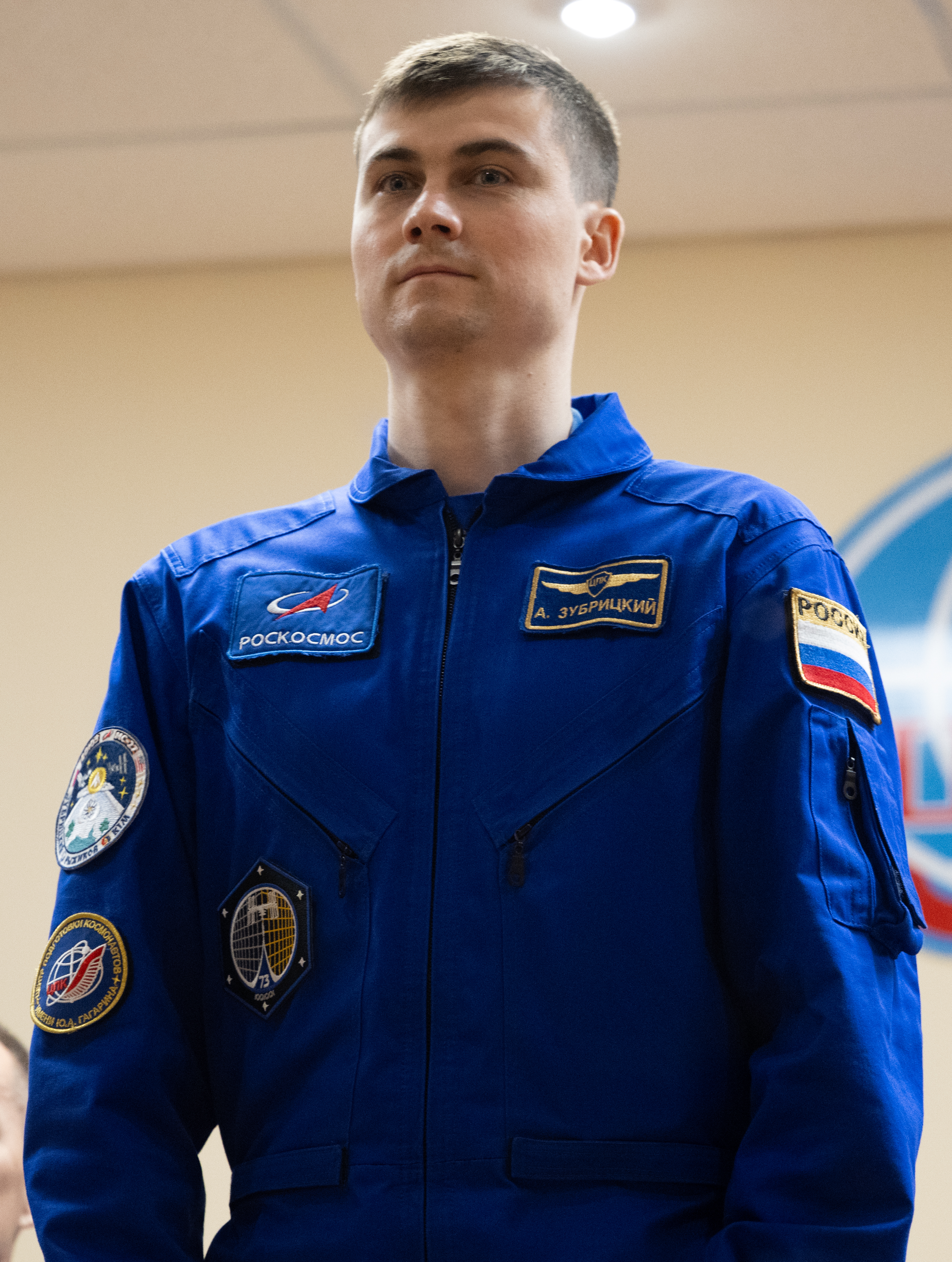
- Zubritsky in 2025
- Born: Alexey Vitalyevich Zubritsky; 22 August 1992 (age 34); Volodymyrivske, Zaporizhzhia, Ukraine
- Citizenship: Russia
- Education: Ivan Kozhedub National University of the Air Force
- Space career

Roscosmos cosmonaut
- Current occupation: Test cosmonaut
- Previous occupation: Military pilot
- Status: Active
- Rank: Senior lieutenant, Russian Air Force
- Time in space: 244 days, 23 hours, 16 minutes
- Selection: 17th Cosmonaut Group (2018)
- Total EVAs: 2
- Total EVA time: 13 hours, 3 minutes
- Missions: Soyuz MS-27 (Expedition 72/73)
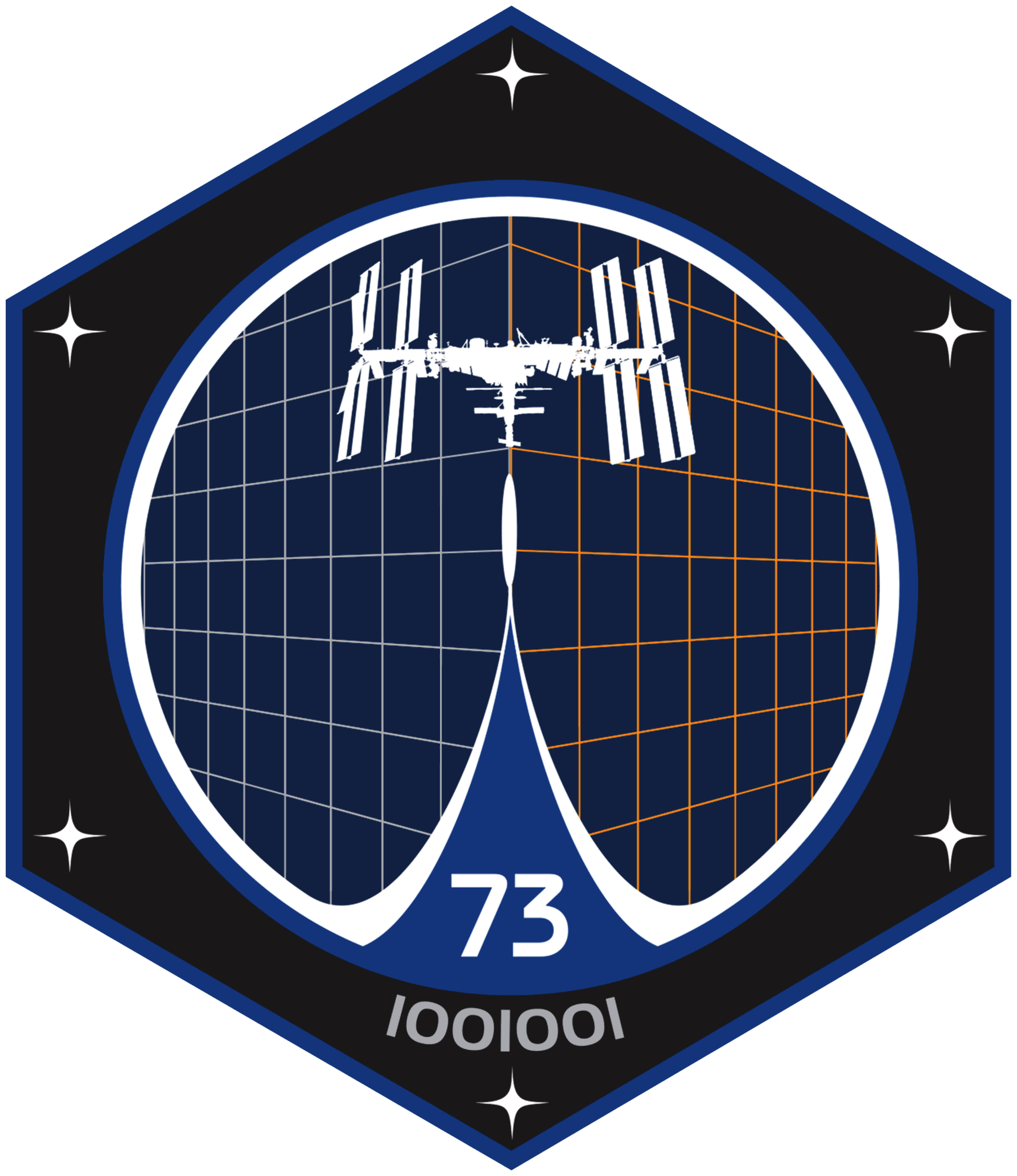
- Mission insignia

Alexey Vitalyevich Zubritsky (Russian: Алексей Витальевич Зубри́цкий; born 22 August 1992) is a Russian military pilot and cosmonaut, selected in 2018. Zubritsky is the 135th cosmonaut of the Roscosmos Cosmonaut Corps.

== Early life and education ==
Alexey Zubritsky was born on 22 August 1992 in the village of Vladimirovskoe, Zaporizhzhia Oblast, Ukraine. He graduated from secondary school in Zaporizhzhia in 2009. He graduated from the Ivan Kozhedub National University of the Air Force in 2013, with a degree in Aviation Unit Operations Management, specializing in Flight Operation and Combat Use of Aircraft.

== Military career ==
From September 2013 to March 2014, Zubritsky served as a pilot in the 204th Tactical Aviation Brigade, flying the MiG-29 fighter and L-39 jet trainer, based in Sevastopol, Crimea.

Following the Russian annexation of Crimea, Zubritsky continued to serve in Sevastopol, now part of the 4th Guards Air and Air Defence Forces Army.

In March 2014, Zubritsky served in the 38th Fighter Aviation Regiment, before transferring to the 31st Fighter Aviation Regiment in December 2014.

From July 2015 to November 2018, Zubritsky served as a senior pilot in the 960th Assault Aviation Regiment, flying the Su-25 attack aircraft.

Following the end of his contract in 2024, Zubritsky retired to the reserves after ten years of service, and over 500 hours of total flight time and a class qualification of "Military Pilot, Third Class".

== Cosmonaut career ==
He was selected to join the Roscosmos Cosmonaut Corps in 2018 and made his first flight to space on Soyuz MS-27 on 8 April 2025 and served as a flight engineer on the International Space Station during Expedition 72 and 73.

In November 2024, Zubritsky was selected as the seventh TASS special correspondent on the International Space Station.

=== Expedition 72/73 ===
Zubritsky was selected as flight engineer, together with Roscosmos cosmonaut commander Sergey Ryzhikov and NASA astronaut flight engineer Jonny Kim for Expedition 72/73, launching from Baikonur Cosmodrome on 8 April 2025, aboard Soyuz MS-27.

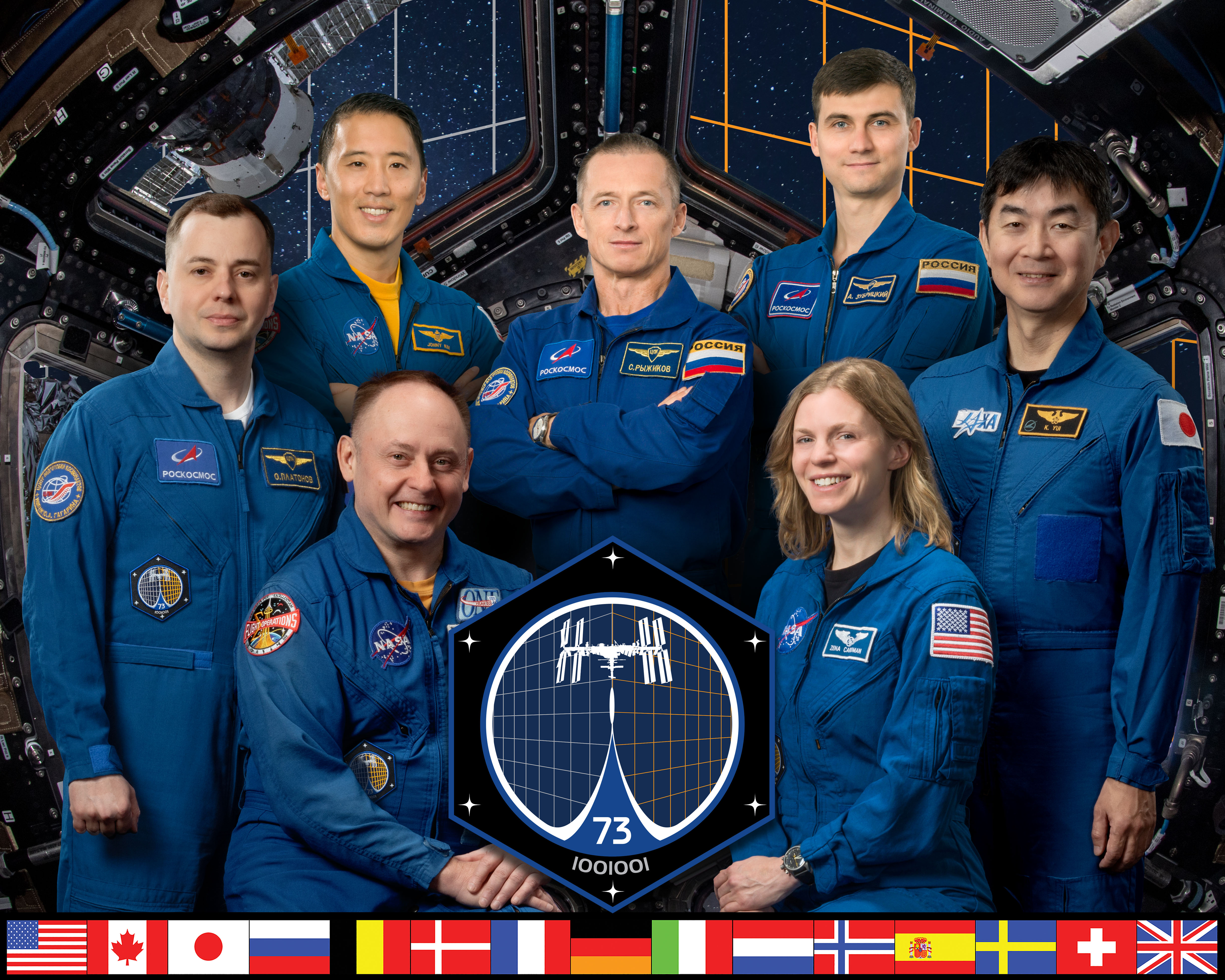
Expedition 73 portrait

On 9 May 2025, Zubritsky, Sergey Ryzhikov, and Kirill Peskov unveiled a Victory Banner in honor of the 80th anniversary of victory in the Great Patriotic War.

On October 16, Ryzhikov and Zubritsky performed a 6-hour, 9-minute spacewalk to install the Ekran-M payload onto the Nauka module frame, jettisoned some cameras and a mounting platform, cleaned the windows on Zvezda service module, and removed a SSK panel and a Biorisk container.

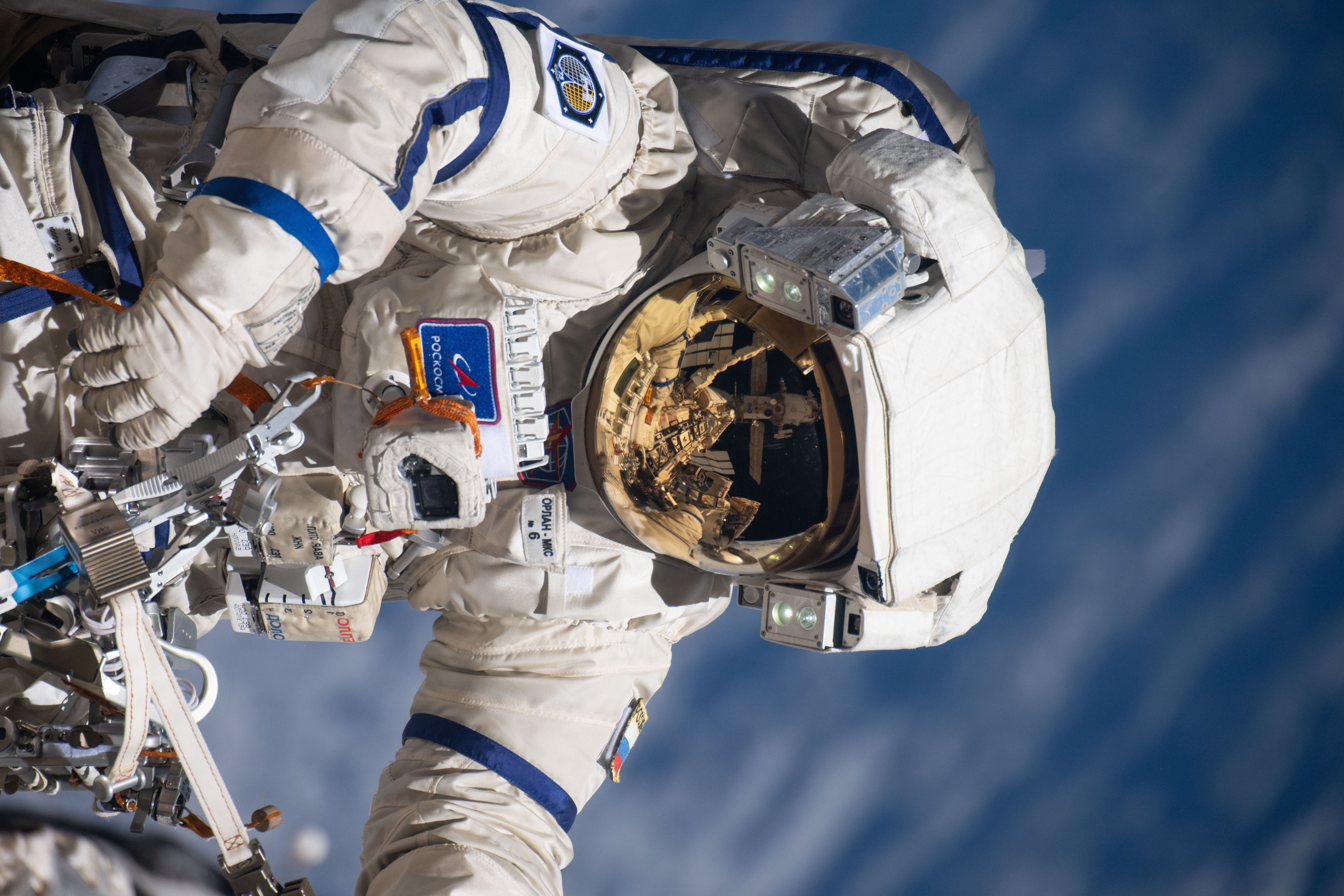
Zubritsky during an EVA on 28 October 2025.

On October 28, Ryzhikov and Zubritsky performed a 6-hour, 54-minute spacewalk to install the final set of payloads onto the Nauka module frame the IPI plasma injector into slots two and three, relocate the ERA control panel, clean the Nauka science window, and replace a cassette in the Ekran-M payload. Roscosmos announced that, for the first time in history, perfect crystal gallium arsenide structures had been grown in outer space.

Zubritsky, Ryzhikov, and Kim returned to Earth on 9 December 2025.

== Personal life ==
Zubritsky is an active snowboarder, is interested in sailing, and is a qualified diver. Favorite books: the Harry Potter series, The Lord of the Rings by Tolkien, and Draft by Lukyanenko.

Zubritsky married in 2017 and has a son and daughter.

== Awards ==
- Medal "For Distinguished Military Service" 3rd and 2nd Class
- NASA Space Flight Medal (2026)
