= Fogtrein =

Brazilian research rocket family

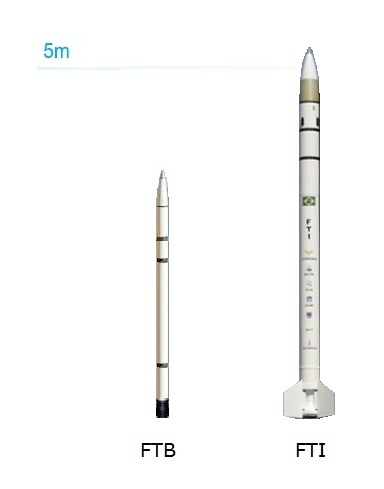
Brazilian Training rockets FTB and FTI

Fogtrein, is the name given to a family of Brazilian research rockets created jointly by the Air Force Command (COMAer) and Avibras.

The rockets are used for testing, qualification and training of teams in the Alcântara Launch Center (CLA) and the Barreira do Inferno Launch Center (CLBI).

These vehicles are designed to be launched in adverse conditions such as high salinity, winds up to 10 m/s and rain up to 10 mm/h. All models will admit payloads (5 kg to 30 kg), with electric networks and telemetry equipment, along experiments of interest in the academic and scientific community.

== Models ==
=== Basic Training Rocket (FTB) ===
FTB (Basic Training Rocket) is intended for operational training of a Launch Center, in isolation, without participation of the remote station for redundant monitoring vehicle, with telemetry in S band and apogee greater than 30 km.

- Stages: Single-stage
- Status : In service.
- Height : 3.05 m
- Diameter : 12.7 cm
- Mass : 67.8 kg
- Payload : 5 kg
- Thrust at launch:
- Apogee : 30 km
- First launch : August 10, 2009
- Last launch: November 7, 2012
- Launches: 26 (in August 2014)

==== Launches ====
List of FTB launches:

| Order | Date | Launch site |
|---|---|---|
| 01 | 10.08.2009 | Alcântara Launch Center |
| 02 | 13.08.2009 | Alcântara Launch Center |
| 03 | 20.10.2009 | Barreira do Inferno Launch Center |
| 04 | 21.10.2009 | Barreira do Inferno Launch Center |
| 05 | 25.02.2010 | Barreira do Inferno Launch Center |
| 06 | 27.04.2010 | Alcântara Launch Center |
| 07 | 29.04.2010 | Barreira do Inferno Launch Center |
| 08 | 26.07.2010 | Alcântara Launch Center |
| 09 | 20.09.2010 | Alcântara Launch Center |
| 10 | 27.04.2011 | Barreira do Inferno Launch Center |
| 11 | 16.06.2011 | Alcântara Launch Center |
| 12 | 17.06.2011 | Alcântara Launch Center |
| 13 | 20.10.2011 | Barreira do Inferno Launch Center |
| 14 | 14.03.2012 | Alcântara Launch Center |
| 15 | 29.03.2012 | Barreira do Inferno Launch Center |
| 16 | 21.05.2012 | Alcântara Launch Center |
| 17 | 29.05.2012 | Alcântara Launch Center |
| 18 | 21.06.2012 | Barreira do Inferno Launch Center |
| 19 | 08.08.2012 | Alcântara Launch Center |
| 20 | 19.09.2012 | Barreira do Inferno Launch Center |
| 21 | 27.09.2012 | Alcântara Launch Center |
| 22 | 31.10.2012 | Alcântara Launch Center |
| 23 | 07.11.2012 | Alcântara Launch Center |
| 24 | 13.03.2013 | Barreira do Inferno Launch Center |
| 25 | 23.05.2013 | Alcântara Launch Center |
| 26 | 08.08.2013 | Alcântara Launch Center |
| 27 | 12.03.2014 | Alcântara Launch Center |
| 28 | 28.08.2014 | Barreira do Inferno Launch Center |
| 29 | 02.10.2014 | Barreira do Inferno Launch Center |
| 30 | 10.12.2014 | Barreira do Inferno Launch Center |
| 31 | 19.06.2015 | Barreira do Inferno Launch Center |
| 32 | 27.08.2015 | Alcantara Space Center |

=== Intermediate Training Rocket (FTI) ===
FTI (Intermediate Training Rocket) is intended for operational training of a Launch Center, in isolation, without participation of the remote station for redundant monitoring vehicle, with telemetry in S-band, C-band transponders, flight termination, and height above 60 km.

- Stages: Single-stage
- Status : In service.
- Height : 5.4 m
- Diameter : 30 cm
- Mass : 490 kg
- Payload : 30 kg
- Thrust at launch:
- Apogee : 60 km
- First launch : August 3, 2010
- Last launch:
- Launches: 8 (on 2013)

==== Launches ====
List of FTI launches:

| Number | Date | Launch site | Comments |
|---|---|---|---|
| 01 | 03.08.2010 | Barreira do Inferno Launch Center | |
| 02 | 30.09.2010 | Alcântara Launch Center | |
| 03 | 26.05.2011 | Alcantara Space Center | |
| 04 | 27.05.2011 | Alcantara Space Center | |
| 05 | 31.08.2011 | Alcantara Space Center | Failure |
| 06 | 02.09.2011 | Alcantara Space Center | |
| 07 | 13.11.2012 | Alcantara Space Center | Operação Tangará I |
| 08 | 29.11.2012 | Alcantara Space Center | |
| 09 | 13.06.2013 | Alcantara Space Center | |
| 10 | 26.06.2013 | Barreira do Inferno Launch Center | |
| 11 | 09.05.2014 | Alcantara Space Center | Operação Águia I |
| 12 | 21.08.2014 | Alcantara Space Center | |
| 13 | 31.10.2015 | Alcantara Space Center | Operação São Lourenço |

=== Advanced Training Rocket (FTA) ===
FTA (Advanced Training Rocket) is intended for operational training on two launch centers, one being responsible for the launch and the other for remote monitoring of vehicle and payloads, with telemetry in S-band, C-band transponders, flight termination, and height exceeding 160 km.

- Stages: Two-stages
- Location : To be developed.
- Apogee : 100 km (planned)
