= Innospace HANBIT-NANO =

South Korean planned small-lift launch vehicle

HANBIT-NANO
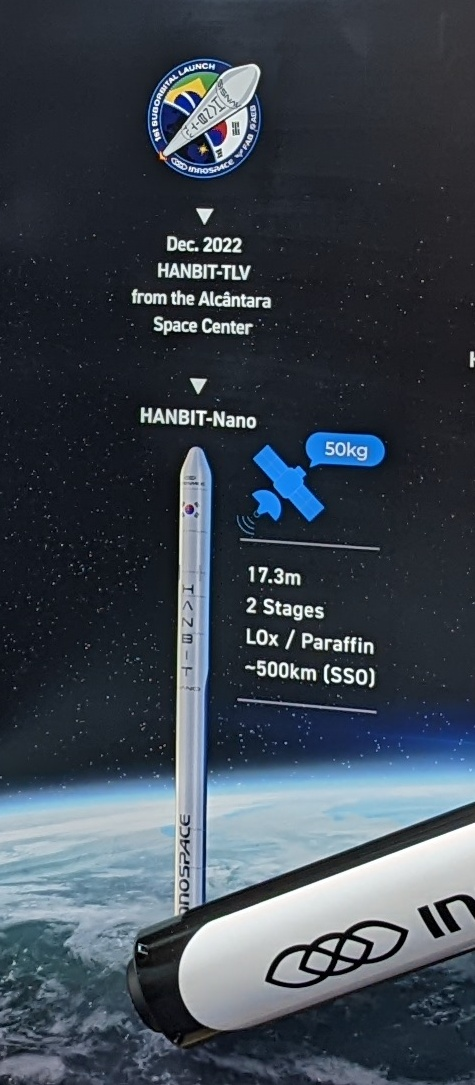
- HANBIT-NANO (International Astronautical Congress, 2022)
- Function: Launch vehicle
- Manufacturer: Innospace
- Country of origin: South Korea

Size
- Height: 21.8 m (72 ft)
- Diameter: 1.4 m (4 ft 7 in)
- Stages: 2

Capacity

Payload to SSO
- Altitude: 500 km (310 mi)
- Mass: 90 kg (200 lb)

Launch history
- Status: Active
- Launch sites: Alcantara Space Center
- Total launches: 1
- Success(es): 0
- Failure: 1
- First flight: 23 December 2025

First stage
- Thrust: 245 kN
- Specific impulse: 292 sec
- Burn time: 150 sec
- Propellant: Paraffin / LOx

Second stage
- Thrust: 34 kN (Hyper); 29 kN (LiMER)
- Specific impulse: 325 sec (Hyper); 350 sec (LiMER)
- Burn time: 270 sec (Hyper); 300 sec (LiMER)
- Propellant: Paraffin / LOx (Hyper); Methane / LOx (LiMER)

HANBIT-NANO (Korean: 한빛-나노) is a two-stage small-lift launch vehicle currently under development by South Korean space startup Innospace.

== Development ==
In December 2024, the first and second stage separation verification tests, which are essential steps in the development of HANBIT-Nano, were successfully completed. The test was conducted at the company's Cheongju plant in North Chungcheong Province, and was carried out in a test facility that simulated the single separation process.

The first launch was initially scheduled for July 2025 from the Alcantara Launch Center in Brazil. In May 2025 INNOSPACE announced that it was rescheduled to the second half of 2025 due to technical issues with the first-stage electric pump and hybrid propulsion system.

On October 20, 2025, Innospace announced that they got the authorization from KASA for their first orbital mission, Spaceward.

== Design ==
It is a two-stage launch vehicle that is 21.8 m long and 1.4 m in diameter and can launch 90 kg into a sun-synchronous orbit at an altitude of 500 km.

The first stage is powered by a single 25-ton hybrid engine. The second stage uses one of two interchangeable engines depending on the customer's mission requirements: either the 3.5-ton hybrid engine 'Hyper' or the 3-ton methane engine 'LiMER'. This design enables customized launch services tailored to specific payloads.

Instead of using gunpowder to create explosive force during the separation, a split nut method using pressure and screws has been adopted. Innospace explained, "Compared to the method using gunpowder, the structure is simple and lightweight, and in particular, it can minimize the impact on the projectile and payload during the separation process."

The fairing was designed by the company to maximize weight reduction and durability by using a lightweight carbon composite layering method instead of a metal structure. A high-temperature coating material is applied to ensure heat resistance in extreme environments.

== Launch sites ==
Starting from Alcantara, Innospace is contracting with numbers of space centers around the world to allow for multiple launch locations aiming for various orbits.

In August 2023, Innospace has signed multi-year, multi-launch agreement with Australian commercial spaceport owner and operator, Equatorial Launch Australia (ELA), to use the Arnhem Space Centre.

Innospace is also investigating strategic options to acquire additional launch sites in Europe, specifically the Andøya Space Center in Norway, as well as Naro Space Center in South Korea to promptly respond to the growing global demand for launching small satellites.

== Launch history ==
Flight No.	Name	Date / time (UTC)	Launch site	Payload	Payload mass	Orbit	Customer	Launch outcome
F1	"Spaceward"	December 23, 2025 00:15	Alcantara Space Center	5 CubeSats, 3 non-separating experimental devices, 1 branding item (Brazil) FloripaSat-2A / 2B, (Brazil) Jussara-K, (India) Solaras S2, (Brazil) PION-BR2	22 kg	Low Earth, 300 km	Various institutes in Brazil, India, and South Korea	Failure

== See also ==
- HANBIT-TLV – Test launch vehicle manufactured by Innospace
- South Korean space program
