= Alcântara Space Center =

Brazilian Space Center

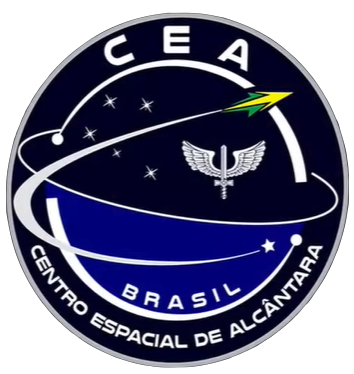

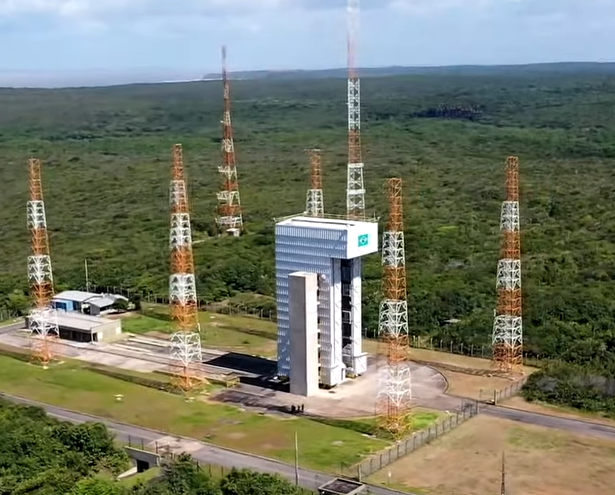
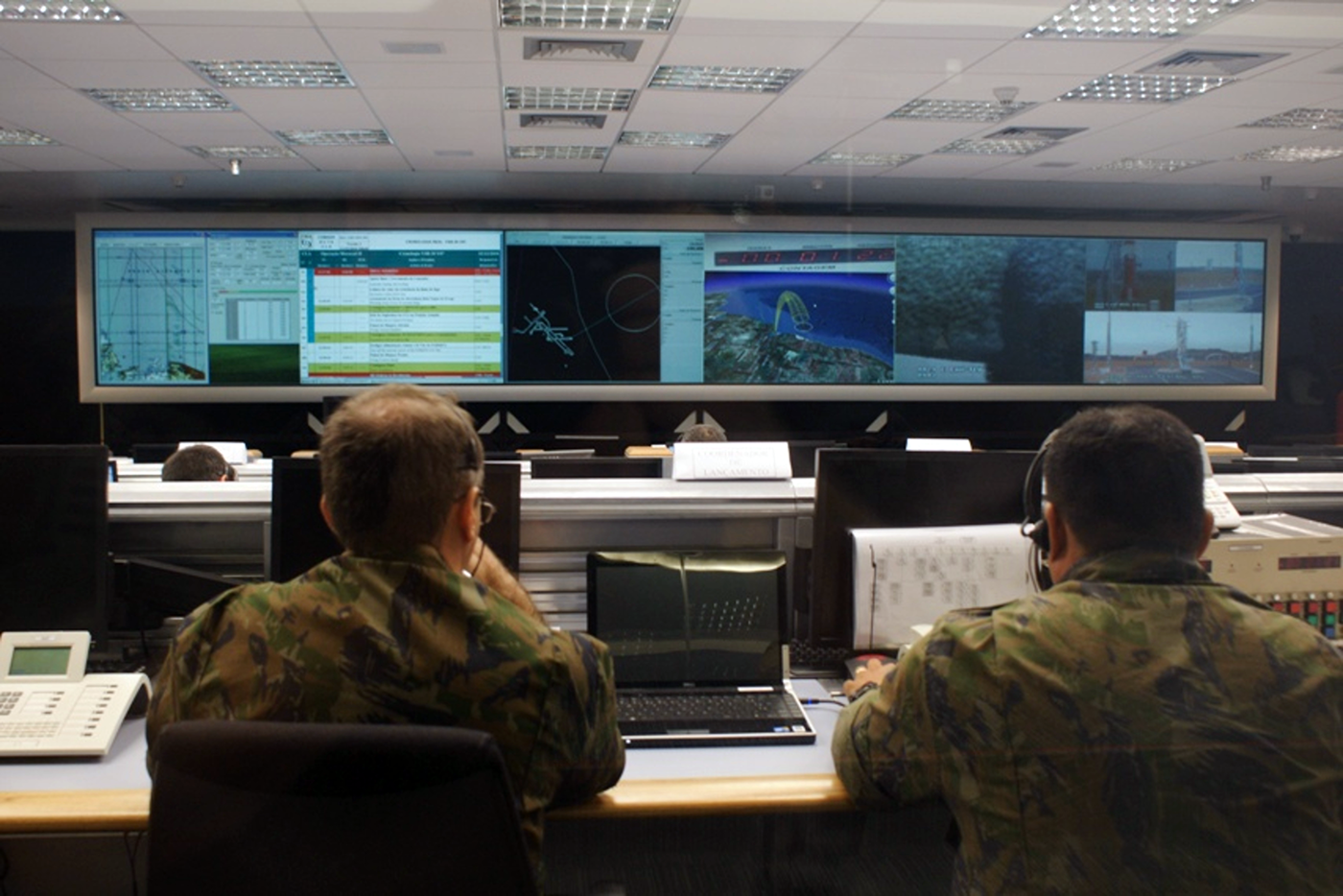
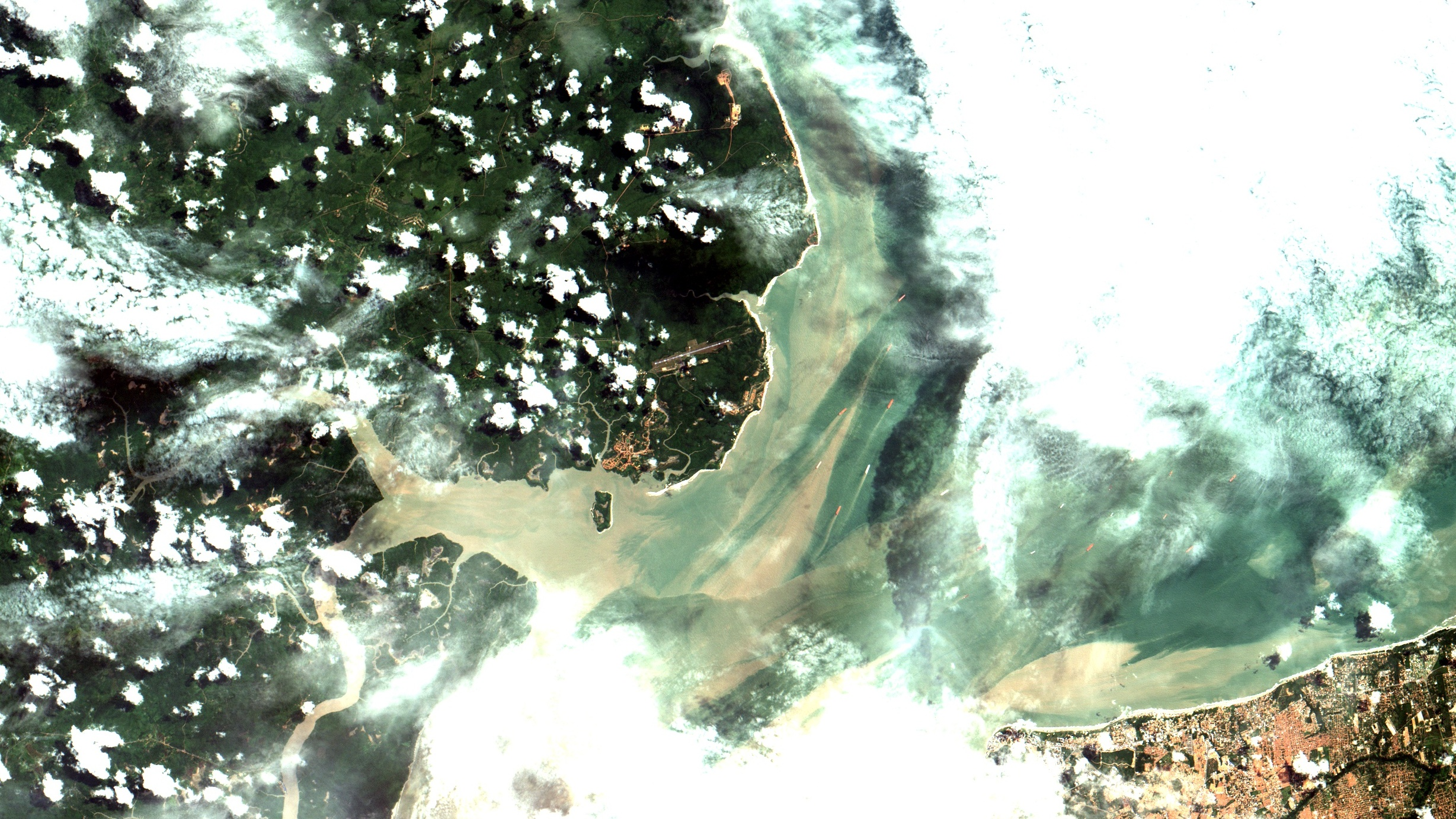
- Left to right from the top: VLS Pad, Control Center, Command Room, Tracking Antenna, Alcântara area from space

- Location of the Alcântara Space Center
- Abbreviation: CEA
- Formation: 1982; 44 years ago
- Type: Spaceport
- Location: Alcântara, Maranhão, Brazil
- Coordinates: 02°20′22″S 44°25′03″W
- Official language: Portuguese; English
- Owner: Aerospace Operations Command; Brazilian Air Force; Brazilian Space Agency
- Director: Col. Marcello Correa De Souza
- Website: fab.mil.br/cla
- Formerly called: Alcântara Launch Center

The Alcântara Space Center (Portuguese: Centro Espacial de Alcântara, CEA), formerly known as Alcântara Launch Center (Portuguese: Centro de Lançamento de Alcântara,) is a space center and launching facility of the Brazilian Space Agency in the city of Alcântara, located on Brazil's northern Atlantic coast, in the state of Maranhão. It is operated by the Brazilian Air Force (Comando da Aeronáutica). The CEA is the closest launching base to the equator. This gives the launch site a significant advantage in launching geosynchronous satellites, an attribute shared by the Guiana Space Centre.

Due to its location, it is well-positioned for geosynchronous launch. As such, several agencies and companies have studied or signed agreements to launch from Alcântara, including Ukraine's Tsyklon-4, Israel's Shavit, Russia's Proton, Virgin Orbit's LauncherOne and Innospace's Hanbit-Nano.

Construction of the base began in 1982. The first launch occurred on February 21, 1990, when the sounding rocket Sonda 2 XV-53 was launched. On August 22, 2003, the explosion of the third VLS-1 (XV-03) killed 21 people.

== Construction ==
Construction of the Alcântara Space Center began in 1982, as the Brazilian Space Agency's existing rocket range at Barreira do Inferno Launch Center was being overtaxed by growing demand for launch capacity. In 2020, the government of Brazil announced their plan to expand the base by more than 12,000 hectares.

=== Controversies ===
The construction of the space center was controversial, as the site for the center was located on several quilombos, settlements inhabited largely by descendants of escaped slaves in Brazil. In 1980, Brazil's military government forcibly relocated more than 300 families to inland villages away from the coast to make way for the center. This heavily disrupted their traditional livelihood of fishing and led to multiple cases of malnutrition among the residents.

Human rights concerns over the displacement of locals were reported on during the center's planned expansions in 2001 and 2021, with residents and activists lobbying the government to halt expansions to prevent more communities from being displaced. In 2023, the Brazilian government issued a public apology to the quilombolas and offered reparations.

== Public-private partnership ==
Companies based in Alcântara as of 2021, with the objective of orbital and sub-orbital launches, for commercial purposes or in partnership with the Brazilian government:

- (Canada) C6 Launch
- (United States) Hyperion Rocket Systems
- (United States) OrionAST
- (South Korea) Innospace

As of August 2021, the Brazilian government established Ordinance No. 698, a regulation that follows the FAA 14 CFR part 450 standard, which deals with launch and re-entry licenses in order to follow the world standard in space activities.

=== Agreement between Brazil and the U.S. ===
In 2019, Brazil and the U.S. signed an agreement, with the objective of preventing unauthorized access or transfer of U.S. technologies related to the launches from Alcântara.

== Structures ==
- Engine preparation facilities (Preparação de Propulsores - PPP)
- Payload preparation facilities (Preparação de Carga Útil - PPCU)
- Liquid-fuel loading facilities (Preparação de Carregamento de Propelentes - PCPL)
- Universal launch tower
- Mobile Integration Tower (TMI - Torre Móvel de Integração): 33m × 10m × 13m, 380 metric tons. Used for VLS rocket assembly.
- Control center (Prédio de Controle Avançado - CASAMATA).
- 2600m runway

== List of launchpads ==
The Alcântara launch pads include:

- VLS Pad (with Mobile Integration Tower - TMI) 02.31770°S 44.36779°W
- MRL Pad (general sounding rocket pad) 02.31608°S 44.36730°W
- "Universal" pad for rockets up to 10 tons 02.31599°S 44.36782°W
- A newly built pad to support Innospace's launches 02.31698°S 44.36873°W

== Launch list ==
The list of flights conducted and planned from Alcântara:

=== Alcântara Space Center (from 2021) ===
Date	Vehicle	Type	Operator	Mission	Payload	Orbit	Result	Ref
14 December 2021	14-X (XS VSB-30 V32)	Hypersonic glide vehicle	FAB	Qualification flight	—	Suborbital	Success	
23 October 2022	VSB-30	Two-stage suborbital launcher	AEB	Santa Branca Operation	PSM	Suborbital	Success	
19 March 2023	HANBIT-TLV	Single-stage suborbital launcher	Innospace	Astrolábio Operation (test flight)	SISNAV	Suborbital	Success	
22 December 2025	HANBIT-Nano	Two-stage orbital launcher	Innospace	Spaceward (orbital test flight)	8 payloads	Low Earth	Failure	
19 August 2026	SEBIT	Single-stage suborbital launcher	Innospace	Test mission	—	Suborbital	Failure	
November 2026	HANBIT-Nano	Two-stage orbital launcher	Innospace	Return-to-flight mission		Low Earth	Planned	
TBA	VS-50	Two-stage suborbital launcher	AEB	Qualification of VLM-1 subsystems	TBA	Suborbital	Planned	
TBA	VLM-1	Three-stage orbital launcher	AEB	VLM-1 Maiden Flight (fully operational)	TBA	Low Earth	Planned	

=== Alcântara Launch Center (1982-2022) ===
Date	Vehicle	Mission	Result	Altitude
1 December 1985	VLS-R1	VLS test launch	Failure	Failure in flight, apogee of 10 km
18 May 1989	VLS-R2	VLS test launch	Success	50 km
21 February 1990	Sonda 2 XV-53	Alcântara Ionosphere	Success	101 km
26 November 1990	Sonda 2 XV-54	Manival Ionosphere	Success	91 km
9 December 1991	Sonda 2 XV-55	Aguas Belas Ionosphere	Success	88 km
1 June 1992	Sonda 3 XV-24	Aeronomy	Success	282 km
31 October 1992	Sonda 2 XV-56	Ponta de Areia Ionosphere	Success	32 km
22 March 1993	Sonda 2 XV-57	Maruda Ionosphere	Success	102 km
2 April 1993	VS-40 PT-01	VS-40 Test	Success	950 km
19 August 1994	Nike Orion	MALTED/CADRE Ionosphere	Success	140 km
20 August 1994	Nike Orion	MALTED/CADRE Ionosphere	Success	140 km
24 August 1994	Nike Orion	MALTED/CADRE Ionosphere	Success	140 km
25 August 1994	Nike Orion	MALTED/CADRE Ionosphere	Success	140 km
9 September 1994	Black Brant	Ionosphere	Success	250 km
21 September 1994	Black Brant	Ionosphere	Success	250 km
23 September 1994	Nike Tomahawk	Ionosphere	Success	270 km
23 September 1994	Nike Tomahawk	Ionosphere	Success	270 km
24 September 1994	Nike Tomahawk	Ionosphere	Success	270 km
24 September 1994	Nike Tomahawk	Ionosphere	Success	270 km
6 October 1994	Black Brant	Ionosphere	Failure	250 km
14 October 1994	Black Brant	Guará H.Alt Spread F Ionosphere	Success	956 km
15 October 1994	Black Brant	Ionosphere	Success	250 km
28 April 1997	VS-30 XV-01	VS-30 Test	Success	128 km
2 November 1997	VLS-1 V01	VLS-1	Failure	Destroyed during launch
21 March 1998	VS-40	VS-40 Test	Success	900 km
15 March 1999	VS-30 XV-04	Operação San Marcos	Success	128 km
11 December 1999	VLS-1 V02	SACI-2	Failure	10 km (Destroyed by range safety)
6 February 2000	VS-30 XV-05	Lençóis Maranhenses	Success	148 km
21 August 2000	VS-30/Orion XV-01	Baronesa	Success	315 km
23 November 2002	VS-30/Orion XV-02	Piraperna Ionosphere	Success	434 km
1 December 2002	VS-30 XV-06	Cumã	Failure	145 km
22 August 2003	VLS-1 XV-03	SATEC	Failure	Exploded on ground (2003 Alcântara VLS accident)
23 October 2004	VSB-30 XV-01	Cajuana Test	Success	100 km
23 October 2004	VSB-30 V01	VSB-30 Flight Test	Success	259 km
19 July 2007	VSB-30 V04	Cumã II	Success	242 km
29 May 2009	Orion	Maracati 1	Success	93 km
10 August 2009	FTB	FogTrein I	Success	
12 December 2010	VSB-30 V07	Maracati 2	Success	242 km (payload recovered)
8 December 2012	VS-30/Orion V.10	Iguaiba	Success	52 km
9 August 2013	FTB	Operação Falcão	Success	32 km
9 May 2014	FTB	Operação Águia I	Success	
21 August 2014	FTI	Operação Águia II	Success	
1 September 2014	VS-30 V.13	Operação Raposa	Success	L-5 liquid engine test
12 September 2018	VS-30 V.14	Operação MUTITI	Success	120 km
22 May 2019	FTB	Operação Águia I/2019	Success	2 launchers
25 June 2020	FTB	Operação Falcão I/2020	Success	30 km
23 November 2021	FTI	Operação Águia III	Success	~60 km
14 December 2021	14-XS	Operação Cruzeiro	Success	280 km
1 June 2022	FTB	Operação Falcon I/2022	Success	30 km
23 October 2022	VSB-30 V.29	Operação Santa Branca	Success	227 km
Source: Astronautix (Until 2010)

== See also ==
- Aerospace Operations Command Brazilian space command
- Rocket Launch Sites Worldwide
