= Innospace =

Korean aerospace company

INNOSPACE
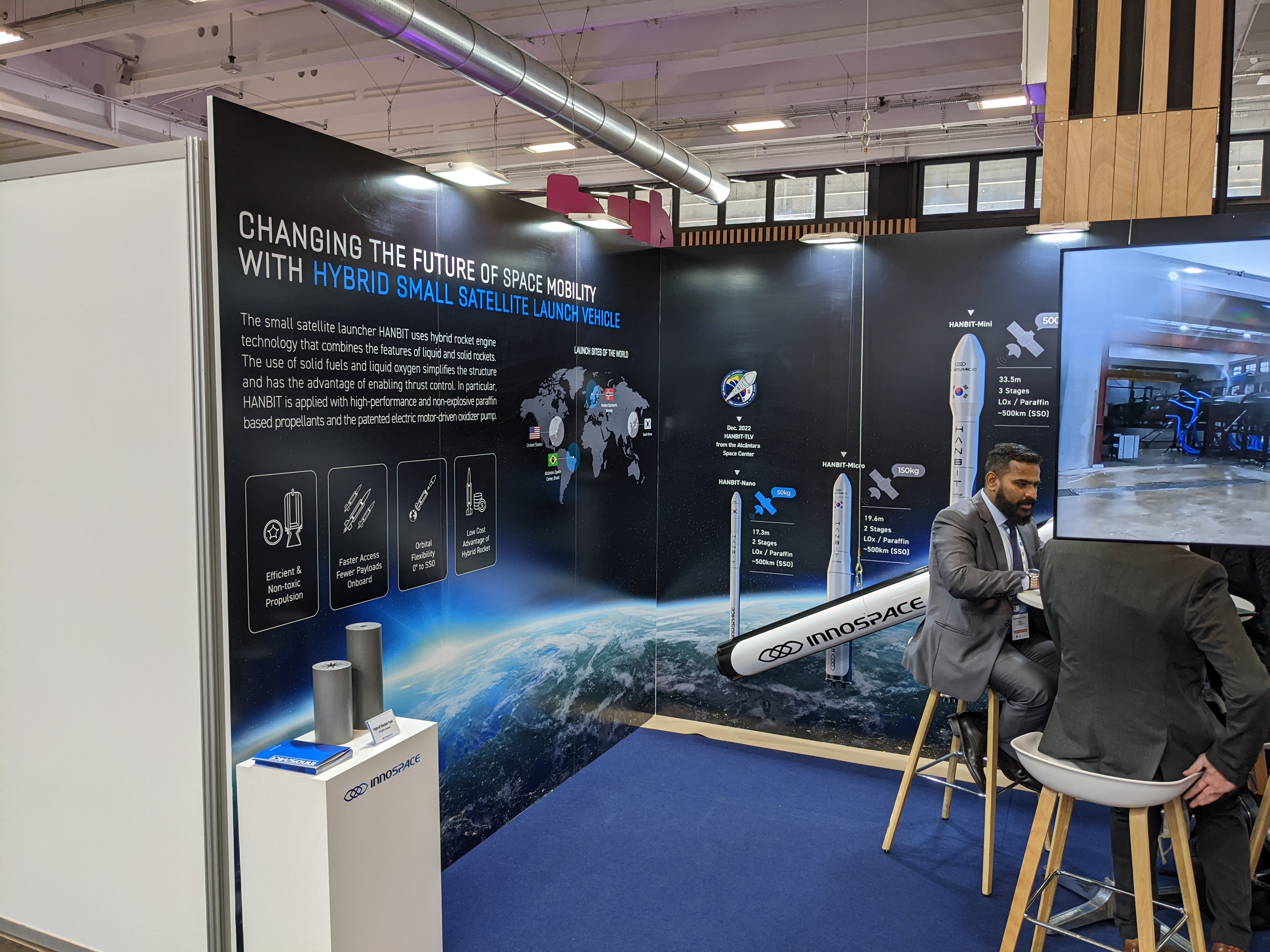
- Innospace stand at the IAC 2022
- Native name: 이노스페이스
- Industry: Aerospace industry
- Founded: September 2017; 8 years ago
- Headquarters: Sejong City, South Korea
- Products: Launch vehicle
- Website: www.innospc.com

Innospace (Korean: 이노스페이스) is a South Korean startup company specializing in developing a hybrid space rocket. It was founded in 2017.

== History ==
Innospace was founded in 2017 by Kim Soo-jong, who received his master's and doctorate in aerospace engineering from Korea Aerospace University.

In June 2024, the company signed a launch service contract with Italy's CShark S.r.l. and Thailand's EOS Orbit for the small satellite launch vehicle HANBIT. Under this contract, Innospace will perform commercial launch missions to place 35 CShark's satellites into target orbit over a three-year period starting in 2025 and one EOS Orbit's satellite in orbit starting in 2025. According to what Innospace revealed in March 2025, the company succeeded in independently developing HANBIT-NANO's launch pad.

== Completed missions ==
=== HANBIT-TLV ===
On 21 March 2023, the company launched its HANBIT-TLV single-stage thrust hybrid suborbital rocket from the Alcantara Space Center in Brazil. This was the first space vehicle launch by the South Korea’s private sector. The company's shares were first publicly traded on 2 July 2024.

== Future missions ==
The company planned its first commercial space missions in 2025.

=== HANBIT-Nano ===
HANBIT-Nano is a two-stage launch vehicle that is 21.8m long and 1.4m in diameter and can launch 90kg into a sun-synchronous orbit at an altitude of 500 km. The first stage is equipped with one 25-ton hybrid engine, and the second stage is equipped with one 3-ton engine. The second stage operates the hybrid engine HyPER and the methane engine LiMER according to the launch mission requested by the customer, thereby providing a customized launch service.

HANBIT-Nano configuration
	First Stage	Second Stage HyPER	Second Stage LiMER
Thrust	245 kN	34 kN	29 kN
Burn Time	150 s	270 s	300 s
SI	292 s	325 s	350 s
Fuel	Paraffin / LOX	Paraffin / LOX	Methane / LOX

=== HANBIT-Micro ===
HANBIT-Micro is a two-stage launch vehicle that is 22.5m long and 1.4m in diameter and can launch 170 kg into a sun-synchronous orbit at an altitude of 500 km. The first stage is equipped with one 25-ton hybrid engine, and the second stage is equipped with one 3-ton methane engine. A final kick stage capable of 4 kN thrust performs the final orbital maneuvering.

HANBIT-Micro configuration
	First Stage	Second Stage	Kick Stage
Thrust	245 kN	2x 29 kN	4 kN
Burn Time	130 s	250 s	390 s
SI	292 s	350 s	350 s
Fuel	Paraffin / LOX	Methane / LOX	Methane / LOX

=== HANBIT-Mini ===
HANBIT-Mini is a three-stage launch vehicle that is 39.6m long and 3.7m in diameter and can launch 1300 kg into a sun-synchronous orbit at an altitude of 500 km. The first stage is equipped with nine 25-ton hybrid engines, and the second stage is equipped with one 25-ton hybrid engine, and the third stage with two 3-ton methane engines.

HANBIT-Mini configuration
	First Stage	Second Stage	Third Stage
Thrust	9x 245 kN	245 kN	2x 29 kN
Burn Time	130 s	150 s	350 s
SI	292 s	325 s	350 s
Fuel	Paraffin / LOX	Paraffin / LOX	Methane / LOX

=== SEBIT ===
SEBIT is a multipurpose suborbital rocket powered by a three-ton-class hybrid rocket engine. The rocket is intended for customer payload testing, technology verification and research missions.

SEBIT configuration
	Single Stage
Thrust	29 kN
Fuel	Methane / LOX

== See also ==
- South Korean space program
