= Expedition 74 =

Long-duration mission to the International Space Station

- First-half crew Promotional Poster
- Mission type: Long-duration expedition
- Operator: NASA / Roscosmos
- Mission duration: 229 days, 5 hours and 21 minutes

Expedition
- Space station: International Space Station
- Began: 9 December 2025
- Ended: 26 July 2026
- Arrived aboard: SpaceX Crew-11; Soyuz MS-28; SpaceX Crew-12; Soyuz MS-29
- Departed aboard: SpaceX Crew-11; Soyuz MS-28

Crew
- Crew size: 3–10
- Members: Expedition 73/74: Zena Cardman; Michael Fincke; Kimiya Yui; Oleg Platonov; Sergey Kud-Sverchkov; Sergey Mikayev; Christopher Williams; Expedition 74/75: Jessica Meir; Jack Hathaway; Sophie Adenot; Andrey Fedyaev; Pyotr Dubrov; Anna Kikina; Anil Menon
- EVAs: 3
- EVA duration: 20 hours, 27 minutes
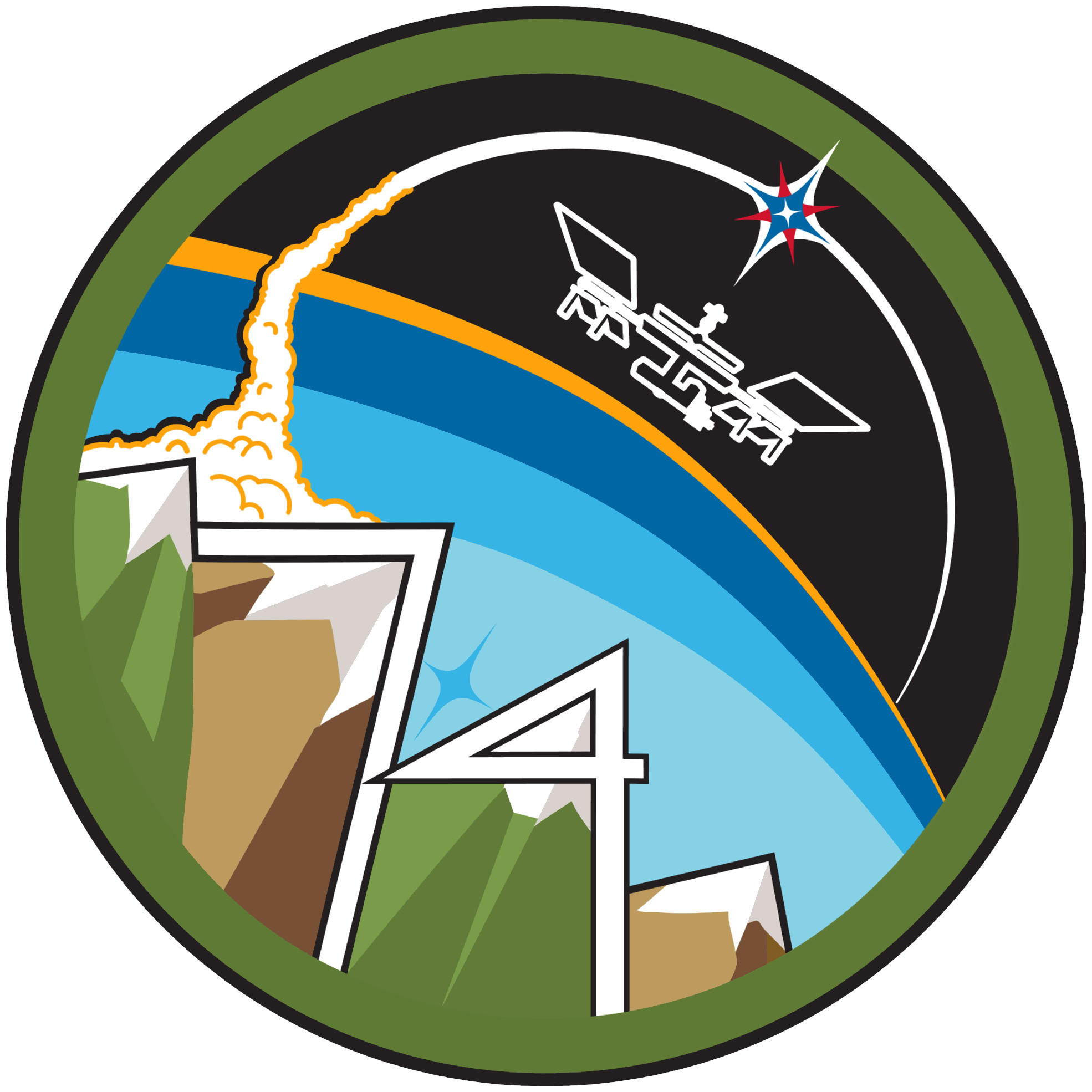
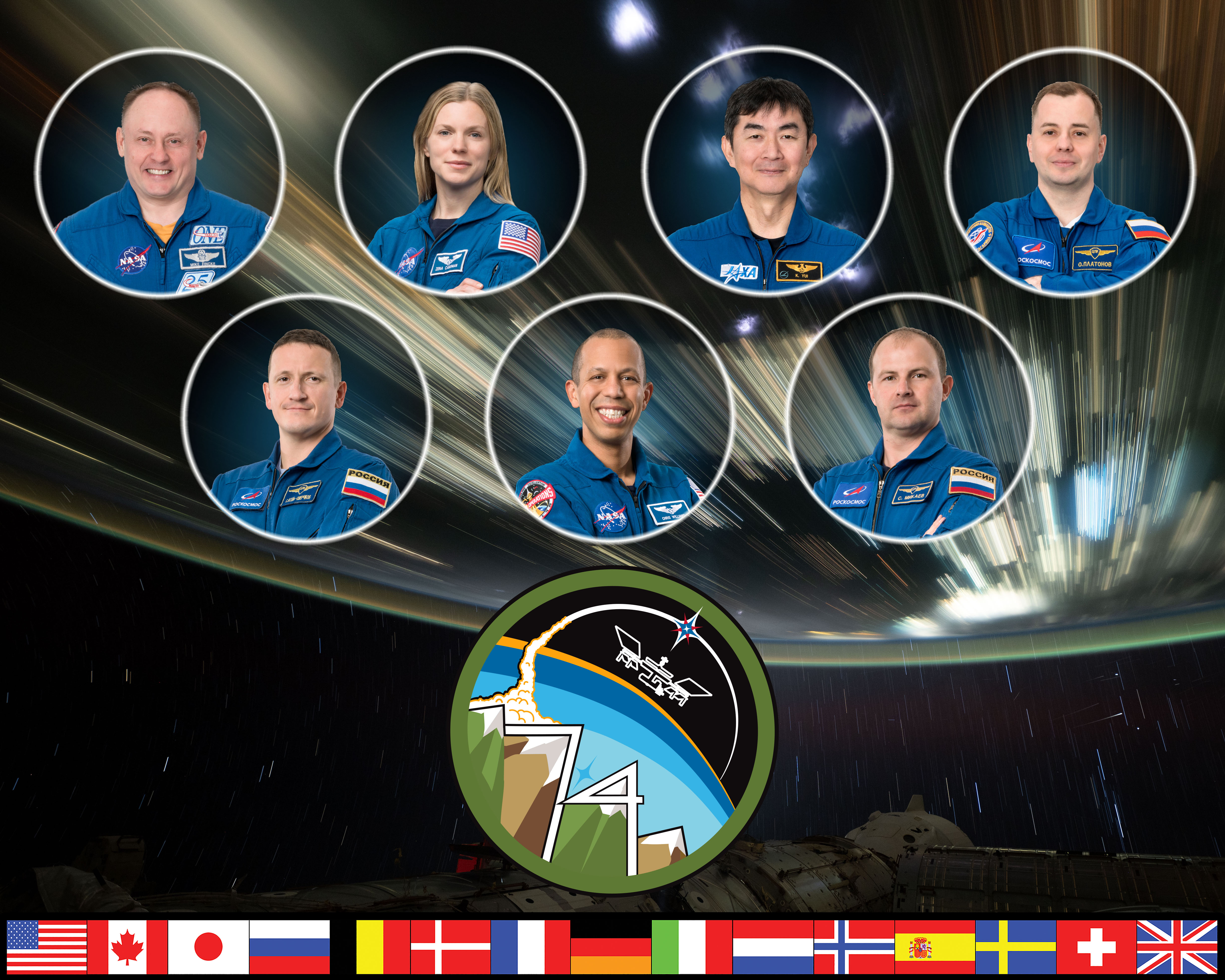
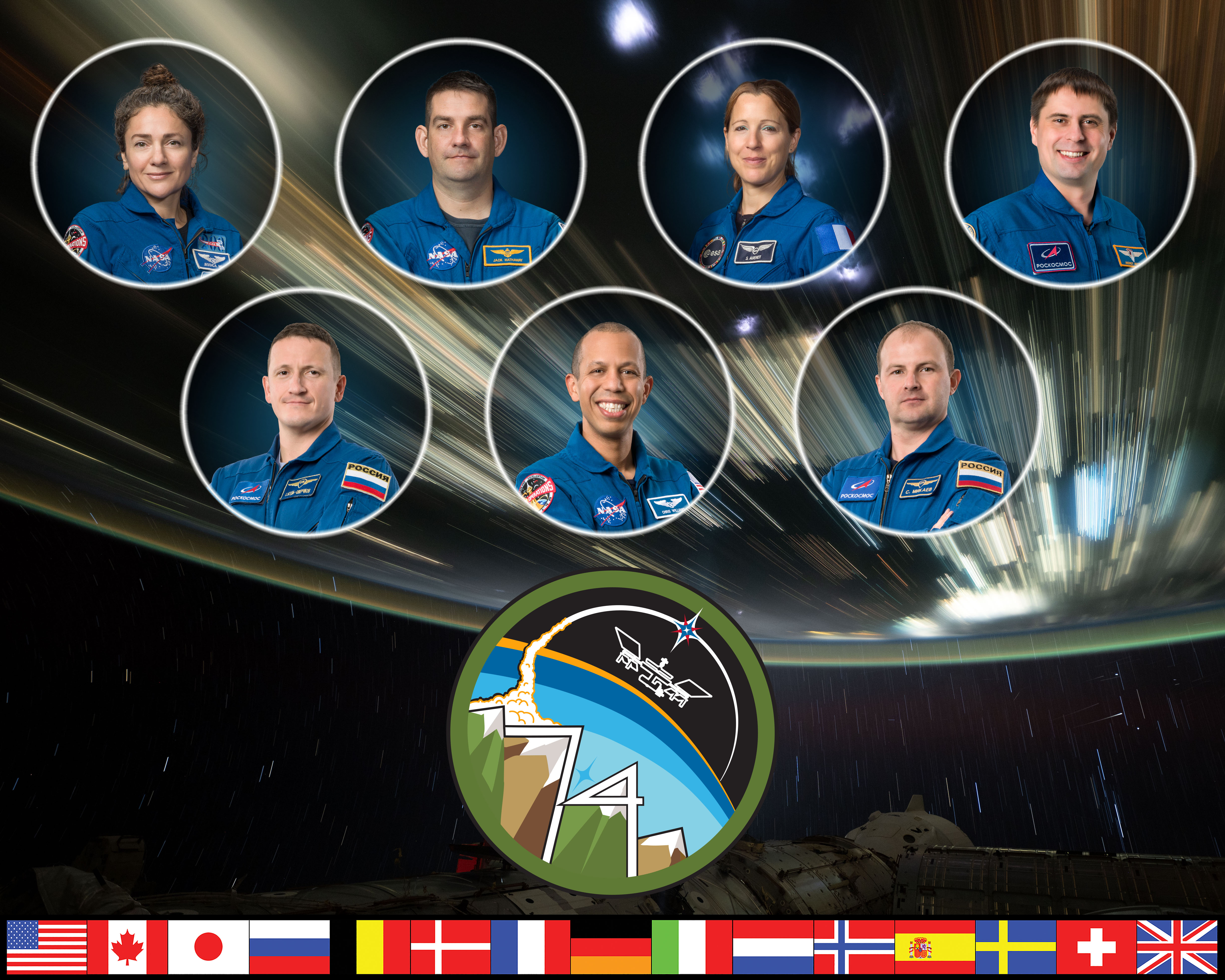
- Expedition 74 mission insignia: The first half crew, from left to right, top row: Fincke, Cardman, Yui, and Platanov Bottom row: Kud‑Sverchkov, Williams, and Mikayev; The second half crew, from left to right, top row: Meir, Hathaway, Adenot, and Fedyaev Bottom row: Kud‑Sverchkov, Williams, and Mikayev; Expeditions

Expedition 74 was the 74th long-duration expedition to the International Space Station (ISS). The expedition began with the departure of Soyuz MS-27 on 9 December 2025 with NASA astronaut Michael Fincke taking over the ISS command and concluded with the undocking of Soyuz MS-28 on 26 July 2026. It continued the extensive scientific research conducted aboard the ISS, focusing on various fields, including biology, human physiology, physics, and materials science. The crew members also maintained and upgraded the space station systems.

== Background, Crew, and Events ==
The expedition commenced with a crew consisting of NASA astronauts Zena Cardman, Michael Fincke, and Christopher Williams, JAXA astronaut Kimiya Yui, and Roscosmos cosmonauts Oleg Platonov, Sergey Kud-Sverchkov, and Sergey Mikayev.

On January 7, 2026, NASA announced that SpaceX Crew-11 would return to Earth about a month early due to an undisclosed "medical situation" affecting one crew member. The incident led to the cancellation of two planned spacewalks on January 8 and 15, including preparations for installation of ISS Roll-Out Solar Arrays (iROSAs) and other maintenance tasks on the Harmony module and the station’s S6 and S4 truss. NASA administrator Jared Isaacman confirmed the early return on January 8.

On January 12, Fincke handed over command of the space station to Kud-Sverchkov. Crew-11 departed with Cardman, Fincke, Yui, and Platonov on January 14 approximately one month ahead of schedule. Fincke later stated that he experienced the medical event, was stabilized by crewmates under the guidance of NASA flight surgeons, and returned early to access advanced medical imaging unavailable on the station. After splashdown, he was treated at Scripps Memorial Hospital La Jolla and later reported he was "doing very well".

SpaceX Crew-12 arrived at the ISS on February 14, transporting NASA astronauts Jessica Meir and Jack Hathaway, ESA astronaut Sophie Adenot, and Roscosmos cosmonaut Andrey Fedyaev.

The expedition saw three spacewalks. On March 18, Meir and Williams conducted a 7-hour, 2-minute spacewalk to prepare the 2A power channel for future installation of another iROSA solar array. On May 27, Kud-Sverchkov and Mikayev conducted a 6-hour, 5-minute spacewalk to install a solar experiment on the Zvezda service module, remove science hardware from the Poisk and Nauka modules, and photograph the Kurs rendezvous antenna on the Progress MS-33 cargo spacecraft that had failed to deploy after its March launch. On June 30, Williams and Meir conducted a 7-hour, 20-minute spacewalk to repair Canadarm2, removing a spare wrist joint from ESP2, swapping it for the broken one, and bringing the broken joint inside the station for return to Earth for inspection and potential refurbishment.

Soyuz MS-29 arrived at the station on July 14, transporting Roscosmos cosmonauts Pyotr Dubrov and Anna Kikina, along with NASA astronaut Anil Menon. After a two-week handover period, Kud-Sverchkov transferred command of the ISS to Meir on July 25. The expedition came to a close on July 26 with the departure of Kud-Sverchkov, Mikayev, and Williams on Soyuz MS-28.

== Events manifest ==
Events involving crewed spacecraft are listed in bold.

Previous mission: Expedition 73

- 9 December 2025 – **Soyuz MS-27 undocking, official switch from Expedition 73**
- 7 January 2026 – Undisclosed "medical situation" experienced by Fincke, US EVAs cancelled
- 12 January 2026 – ISS Expedition 74 change of command from Michael Fincke to Sergey Kud-Sverchkov
- 14 January 2026 – **SpaceX Crew-11 undocking**
- 14 February 2026 – **SpaceX Crew-12 docking**
- 26 February 2026 – CRS SpX-33 undocking
- 6 March 2026 – HTV-X1 unberthing and release
- 12 March 2026 – CRS NG-23 unberthing and release
- 16 March 2026 – Progress MS-31 undocking
- 18 March 2026 – EVA 1 (US-94) Meir/Williams: 7 hrs, 2 mins
- 24 March 2026 – Progress MS-33 docking
- 13 April 2026 – CRS NG-24 capture and berthing
- 20 April 2026 – Progress MS-32 undocking
- 28 April 2026 – Progress MS-34 docking
- 17 May 2026 – CRS SpX-34 docking
- 27 May 2026 – EVA 2 (VKD-66) Kud-Sverchkov/Mikayev: 6 hrs, 5 mins
- 16 June 2026 – CRS SpX-34 undocking
- 30 June 2026 – EVA 3 (US-95) Williams/Meir: 7 hrs, 20 mins
- 14 July 2026 – **Soyuz MS-29 docking**
- 25 July 2026 – ISS Expedition 74/75 change of command from Sergey Kud-Sverchkov to Jessica Meir
- 26 July 2026 – **Soyuz MS-28 undocking, official switch** **to Expedition 75**

Next mission: Expedition 75

== Crew ==
Flight	Astronaut	Increment 74a	Increment 74b	Increment 74c	Increment 74d
Flight	Astronaut	9 Dec 2025–14 Jan 2026	14 Jan–14 Feb 2026	14 Feb–14 Jul 2026	14–26 Jul 2026
Soyuz MS-28	Sergey Kud-Sverchkov, Roscosmos; Second spaceflight	Flight engineer	Commander		
Soyuz MS-28	Sergey Mikayev, Roscosmos; First spaceflight	Flight engineer			
Soyuz MS-28	Christopher Williams, NASA; First spaceflight	Flight engineer			
SpaceX Crew-11	Zena Cardman, NASA; First spaceflight	Flight engineer	Off station		
SpaceX Crew-11	Michael Fincke, NASA; Fourth and last spaceflight	Commander	Off station		
SpaceX Crew-11	Kimiya Yui, JAXA; Second spaceflight	Flight engineer	Off station		
SpaceX Crew-11	Oleg Platonov, Roscosmos; First spaceflight	Flight engineer	Off station		
SpaceX Crew-12	Jessica Meir, NASA; Second spaceflight	Off station		Flight engineer	
SpaceX Crew-12	Jack Hathaway, NASA; First spaceflight	Off station		Flight engineer	
SpaceX Crew-12	Sophie Adenot, ESA; First spaceflight	Off station		Flight engineer	
SpaceX Crew-12	Andrey Fedyaev, Roscosmos; Second spaceflight	Off station		Flight engineer	
Soyuz MS-29	Pyotr Dubrov, Roscosmos; Second spaceflight	Off station			Flight engineer
Soyuz MS-29	Anna Kikina, Roscosmos; Second spaceflight	Off station			Flight engineer
Soyuz MS-29	Anil Menon, NASA; First spaceflight	Off station			Flight engineer

== Vehicle manifest ==
Vehicle	Purpose	Port	Docking date	Undocking date
Vehicles inherited from Expedition 73
Progress MS-31	Cargo	Poisk zenith	5 Jul 2025	16 Mar 2026
SpaceX Crew-11 "Endeavour"	Exp. 73/74 crew	Harmony zenith	2 Aug 2025	14 Jan 2026
CRS SpX-33	Cargo	Harmony forward	25 Aug 2025	26 Feb 2026
Progress MS-32	Cargo	Zvezda aft	13 Sep 2025	20 Apr 2026
CRS NG-23	Cargo	Unity nadir	18 Sep 2025	24 Nov 2025
CRS NG-23	Cargo	Unity nadir	1 Dec 2025 (reberth)	12 Mar 2026 (Exp. 74)
HTV-X1	Cargo	Harmony nadir	29 Oct 2025	6 Mar 2026
Soyuz MS-28 "Gyrfalcon"	Exp. 73/74 crew	Rassvet nadir	27 Nov 2025	26 Jul 2026
Vehicles docked during Expedition 74
SpaceX Crew-12 "Freedom"	Exp. 74/75 crew	Harmony zenith	14 Feb 2026	7 Oct 2026 (Exp. 75)
Progress MS-33	Cargo	Poisk zenith	24 Mar 2026	7 Sep 2026 (Exp. 75)
CRS NG-24	Cargo	Unity nadir	13 Apr 2026	9 Oct 2026 (Exp. 75)
Progress MS-34	Cargo	Zvezda aft	28 Apr 2026	22 Nov 2026 (Exp. 75)
CRS SpX-34	Cargo	Harmony forward	17 May 2026	16 June 2026
Soyuz MS-29 "Tigris"	Exp. 74/75 crew	Prichal nadir	14 Jul 2026	5 Apr 2027 (Exp. 75)

Segment	US Orbital Segment				Russian Orbital Segment			
Period	Harmony forward	Harmony zenith	Harmony nadir	Unity nadir	Rassvet nadir	Prichal nadir	Poisk zenith	Zvezda aft
9 Dec 2025–14 Jan 2026	CRS SpX-33	SpaceX Crew-11	HTV-X1	CRS NG‑23	Soyuz MS-28	Vacant	Progress MS-31	Progress MS-32
14 Jan–14 Feb 2026	CRS SpX-33	Vacant	HTV-X1	CRS NG‑23	Soyuz MS-28	Vacant	Progress MS-31	Progress MS-32
14–26 Feb 2026	CRS SpX-33	SpaceX Crew-12	HTV-X1	CRS NG‑23	Soyuz MS-28	Vacant	Progress MS-31	Progress MS-32
26 Feb–6 Mar 2026	Vacant	SpaceX Crew-12	HTV-X1	CRS NG‑23	Soyuz MS-28	Vacant	Progress MS-31	Progress MS-32
6–12 Mar 2026	Vacant	SpaceX Crew-12	Vacant	CRS NG‑23	Soyuz MS-28	Vacant	Progress MS-31	Progress MS-32
12–16 Mar 2026	Vacant	SpaceX Crew-12	Vacant	Vacant	Soyuz MS-28	Vacant	Progress MS-31	Progress MS-32
16–24 Mar 2026	Vacant	SpaceX Crew-12	Vacant	Vacant	Soyuz MS-28	Vacant	Vacant	Progress MS-32
24 Mar–13 Apr 2026	Vacant	SpaceX Crew-12	Vacant	Vacant	Soyuz MS-28	Vacant	Progress MS-33	Progress MS-32
13–20 Apr 2026	Vacant	SpaceX Crew-12	Vacant	CRS NG-24	Soyuz MS-28	Vacant	Progress MS-33	Progress MS-32
20–28 Apr 2026	Vacant	SpaceX Crew-12	Vacant	CRS NG-24	Soyuz MS-28	Vacant	Progress MS-33	Vacant
28 Apr–17 May 2026	Vacant	SpaceX Crew-12	Vacant	CRS NG-24	Soyuz MS-28	Vacant	Progress MS-33	Progress MS-34
17 May–16 Jun 2026	CRS SpX-34	SpaceX Crew-12	Vacant	CRS NG-24	Soyuz MS-28	Vacant	Progress MS-33	Progress MS-34
16 Jun–14 Jul 2026	Vacant	SpaceX Crew-12	Vacant	CRS NG-24	Soyuz MS-28	Vacant	Progress MS-33	Progress MS-34
14–26 Jul 2026	Vacant	SpaceX Crew-12	Vacant	CRS NG-24	Soyuz MS-28	Soyuz MS-29	Progress MS-33	Progress MS-34

The Prichal aft, forward, starboard, and aft ports all have yet to be used since the module originally docked to the station and are not included in the table.
