= Soyuz MS-28 =

2025 Russian crewed spaceflight to the International Space Station

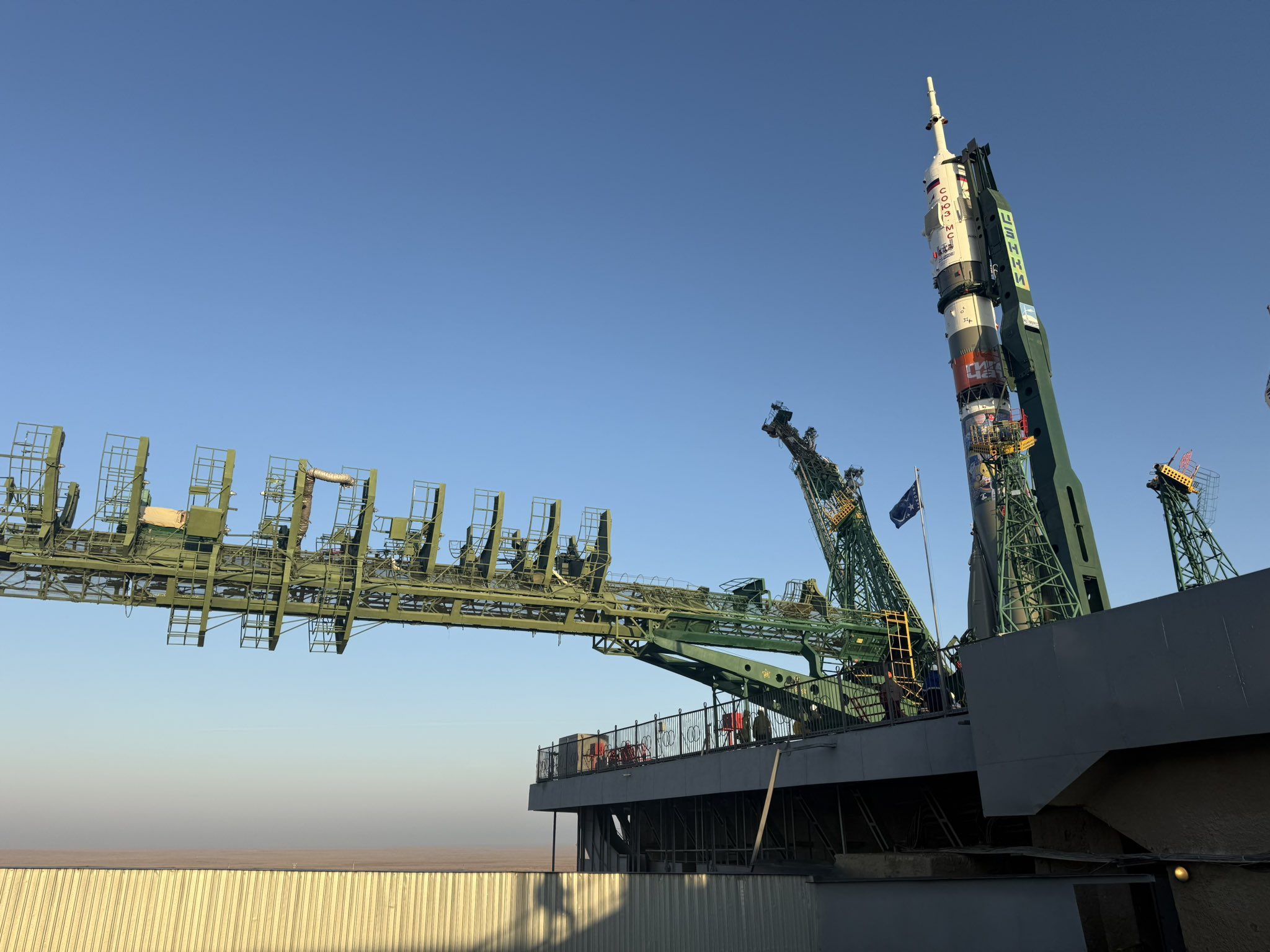
- Soyuz MS-28 shortly after it was rolled out to the launch site
- Names: ISS 74S
- Mission type: ISS crew transport
- Operator: Roscosmos
- COSPAR ID: 2025-275A
- SATCAT no.: 66664
- Mission duration: 241 days and 59 minutes

Spacecraft properties
- Spacecraft: Soyuz MS-28 No. 753
- Spacecraft type: Soyuz MS
- Manufacturer: Energia

Crew
- Crew size: 3
- Members: Sergey Kud-Sverchkov; Sergey Mikayev; Christopher Williams
- Callsign: Gyrfalcon

Start of mission
- Launch date: 27 November 2025, 09:27:57 UTC (14:27:57 AQTT)
- Rocket: Soyuz-2.1a
- Launch site: Baikonur, Site 31/6
- Contractor: RKTs Progress

End of mission
- Landing date: 26 July 2026, 10:27:25 UTC
- Landing site: Kazakh Steppe, Kazakhstan

Orbital parameters
- Reference system: Geocentric orbit
- Regime: Low Earth orbit
- Inclination: 51.66°

Docking with ISS
- Docking port: Rassvet nadir
- Docking date: 27 November 2025, 12:34:35 UTC
- Undocking date: 26 July 2026, 07:02:55 UTC
- Time docked: 240 days, 18 hours and 28 minutes
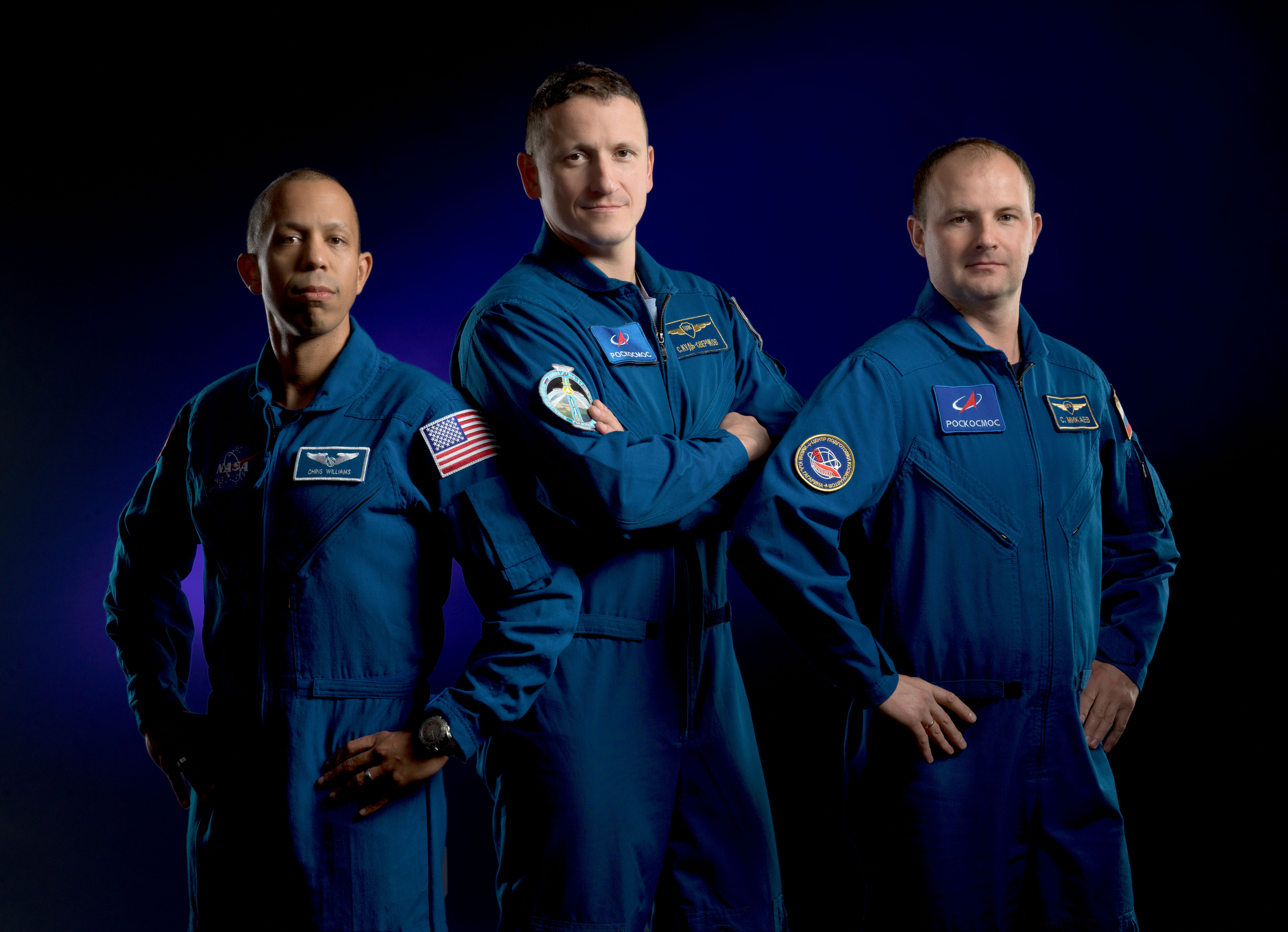
- Mission insignia From left: Williams, Kud-Sverchkov, and Mikayev Soyuz programme

Soyuz MS-28, identified by NASA as Soyuz 74S, was a Russian crewed Soyuz spaceflight launched from Site 31/6 at the Baikonur Cosmodrome on 27 November 2025 to the International Space Station, where it docked to Russia's Rassvet docking port.

== Mission ==
The Soyuz mission was initially scheduled to use Soyuz MS vehicle No. 759, which was next in line for assembly at Energia's factory in Korolyov. During post-production testing, the spacecraft reportedly sustained major damage to its heat shield that could not be repaired in time for the planned launch at the end of 2025. Reports suggested that the shield was either detached when its pyrotechnic bolts were inadvertently triggered (similar to the procedure that occurs shortly before landing) or that its thermal layers delaminated during a poorly executed test. As of October 2025, Roscosmos had not acknowledged the incident, but photographs released from the Baikonur Cosmodrome showed that Soyuz MS vehicle No. 753 was being prepared for flight.

Vehicle No. 753, along with No. 752, had originally been allocated for prospective commercial missions. Vehicle No. 752 was used for the Soyuz MS-20 space tourism flight, but following Russia's invasion of Ukraine, commercial contracts with the Russian space program were cancelled. As a result, No. 753 was reassigned to regular International Space Station operations. The substitution also allowed Roscosmos to utilize the older spacecraft before its onboard systems exceeded their certified service life.

Preparations for launch began in early October 2025 at the Baikonur Cosmodrome, including testing of the spacecraft's Kurs rendezvous system, leak checks in a vacuum chamber, and verification of propulsion, guidance, and communications systems.

The Soyuz-2.1a launch vehicle and payload fairing for the mission arrived by rail at Baikonur on 22 October 2025.

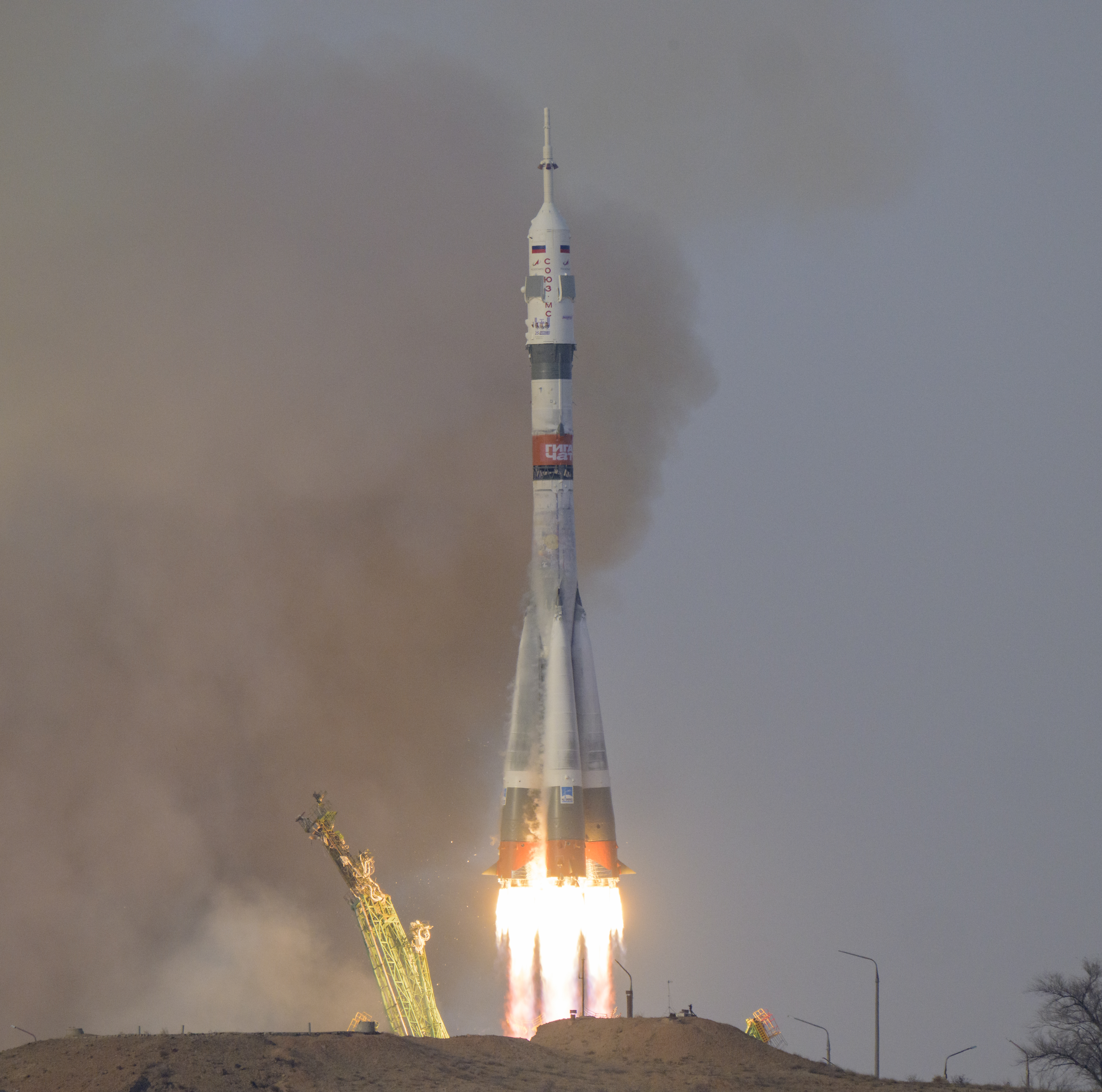
Launch of Soyuz MS-28

The mission launched successfully on 27 November 2025 at 09:27:57 UTC (14:27:57 AQTT, local time at the launch site), and the crew arrived at the ISS a little over three hours later at 12:34 UTC. However, the launch pad at Site 31 was damaged during the launch, with the mobile service platform beneath the pad appearing to have collapsed into the flame trench. The extent of the damage temporarily rendered Russia's only operational crewed launch facility unusable. The next planned launch from the site, the Progress MS-33 cargo mission scheduled for late December, was delayed to 22 March 2026. In the hours following the incident, Roscosmos issued a statement saying it was assessing the situation, had the necessary spare parts, and expected repairs to be completed soon. Repairs to the pad were completed on 3 March 2026.

On the other side, the arrival of Soyuz MS-28 meant that all eight docking ports aboard the ISS are occupied following the reinstallation of Cygnus NG-23 to Unity module on 1 December 2025. It was held on Canadarm2 away from its docking port on 24 November 2025 to provide docking clearance to MS-28. The space station currently hosts: two SpaceX Dragon 2 spacecraft (Crew-11 and CRS-33), the Northrop Grumman Cygnus XL freighter (NG-23), the JAXA's HTV-X cargo ship (HTV-X1), Roscosmos Soyuz MS crew vehicles (MS-27 and MS-28), and two Progress MS cargo spacecraft (MS-31 and MS-32).

On the lower stage of this rocket, the Unity Foundation in collaboration with Roscosmos, wrapped the fuselage with art painted by children from across the world. This project, dubbed "The Art Rocket" and "Rocket of Dreams", was an artistic expression for children with cancer, enabling them to send their dreams to space.

== Crew ==
The mission was slated to be the first to launch after the termination of a NASA/Roscosmos barter agreement, where one Russian cosmonaut flies on a NASA spacecraft in exchange for one NASA astronaut flying on a Soyuz. Consequently, as of 2024, this mission was scheduled to transport three Russian cosmonauts. However, NASA and Roscosmos were negotiating to extend their seat exchange program beyond 2025, and in April 2025, NASA announced that Christopher Williams had been assigned to the crew of Soyuz MS-28, serving as a flight engineer.

Prime crew
Position	Crew
Commander	Sergey Kud-Sverchkov, Roscosmos; Expedition 73/74; Second spaceflight
Flight engineer	Sergey Mikayev, Roscosmos; Expedition 73/74; First spaceflight
Flight engineer	Christopher Williams, NASA; Expedition 73/74; First spaceflight

Backup crew
Position	Crew
Commander	Pyotr Dubrov, Roscosmos
Flight engineer	Anna Kikina, Roscosmos
Flight engineer	Anil Menon, NASA
