= Zena Cardman =

American astronaut (born 1987)

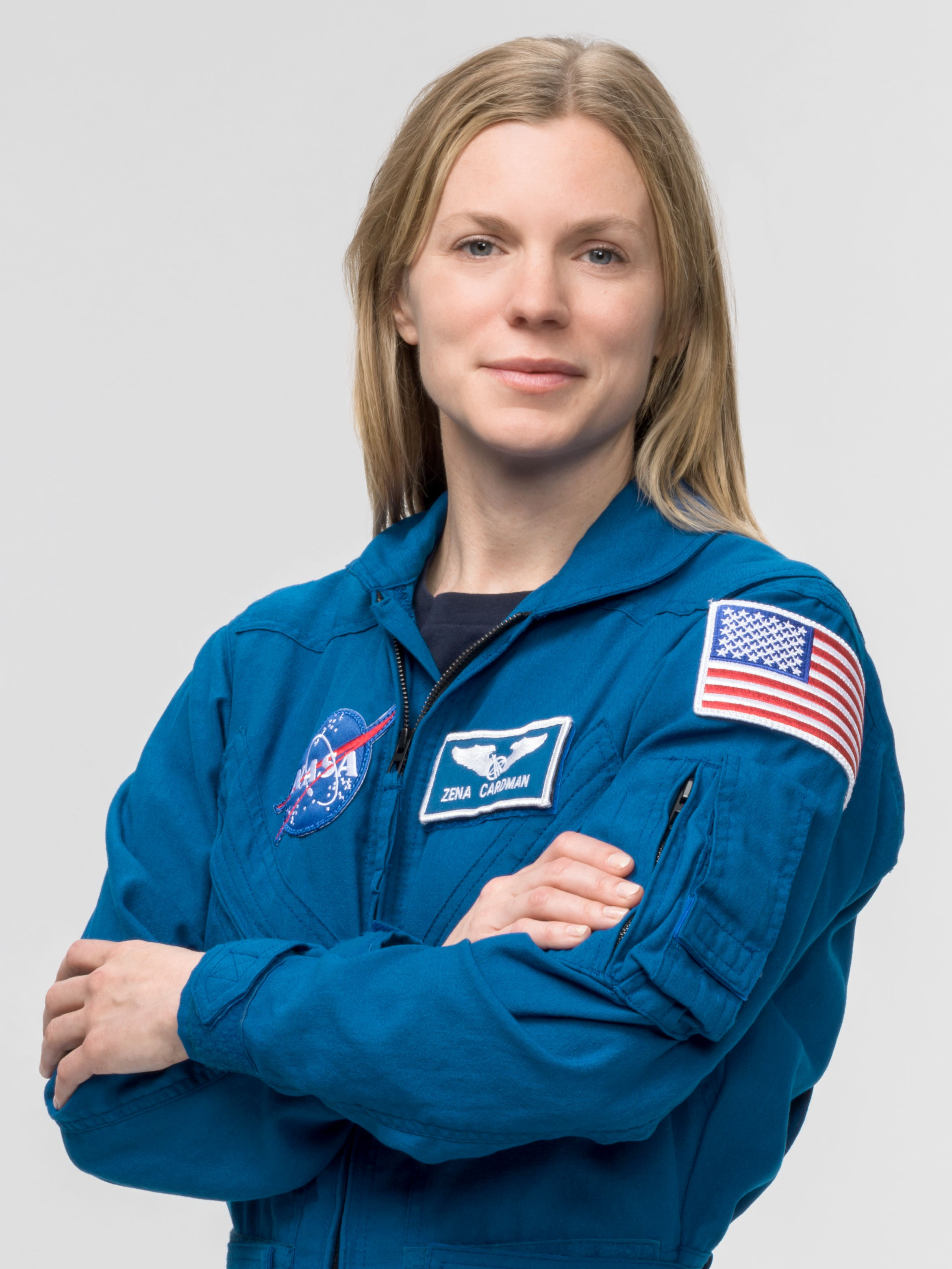
- Cardman in 2023
- Born: Zena Maria Cardman; October 26, 1987 (age 38); Urbana, Illinois, U.S.
- Education: University of North Carolina, Chapel Hill (BS, MS)
- Space career

NASA astronaut
- Time in space: 166 days, 16 hours and 57 minutes
- Selection: NASA Group 22 (2017)
- Missions: SpaceX Crew-11 (Expedition 73/74)
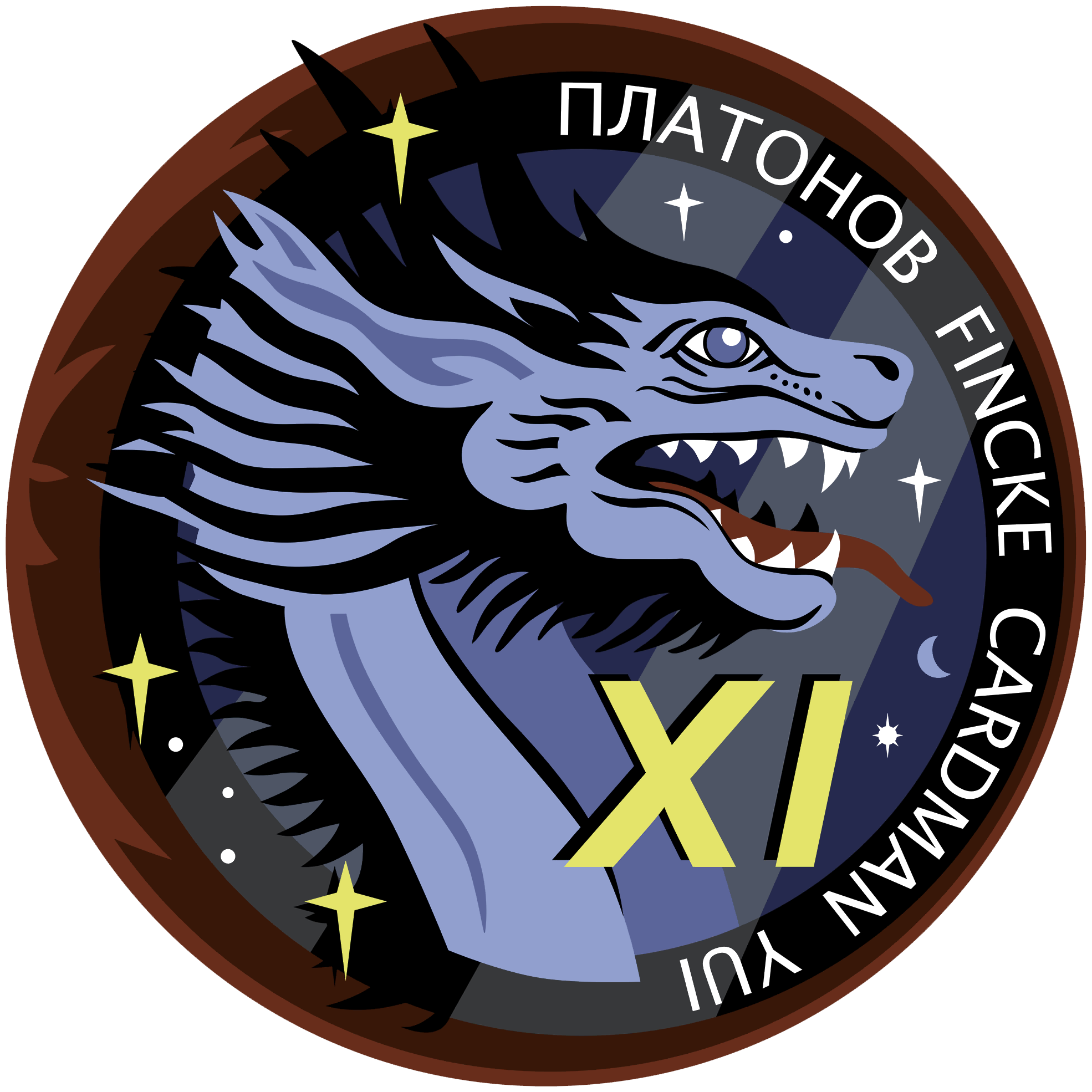
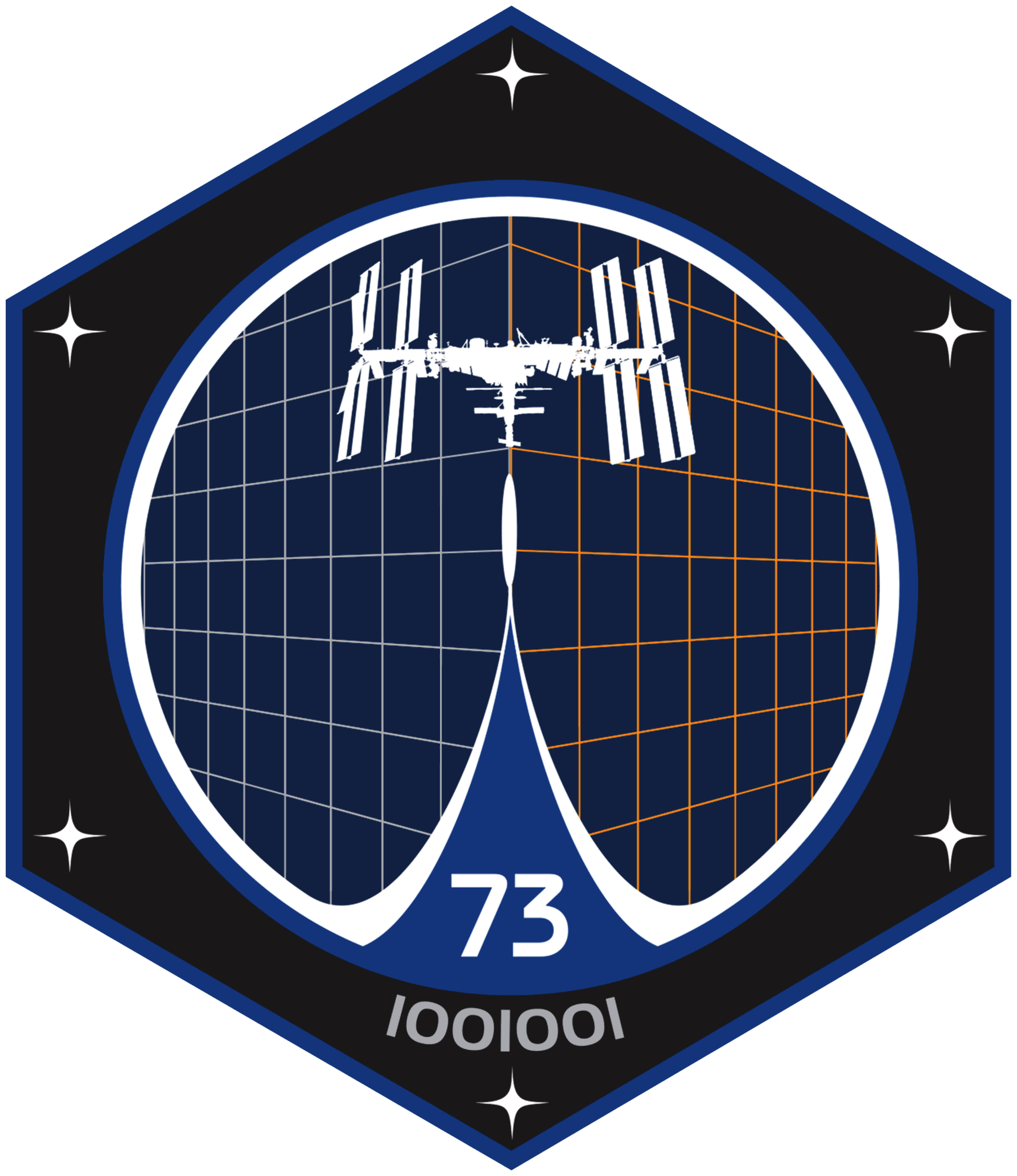
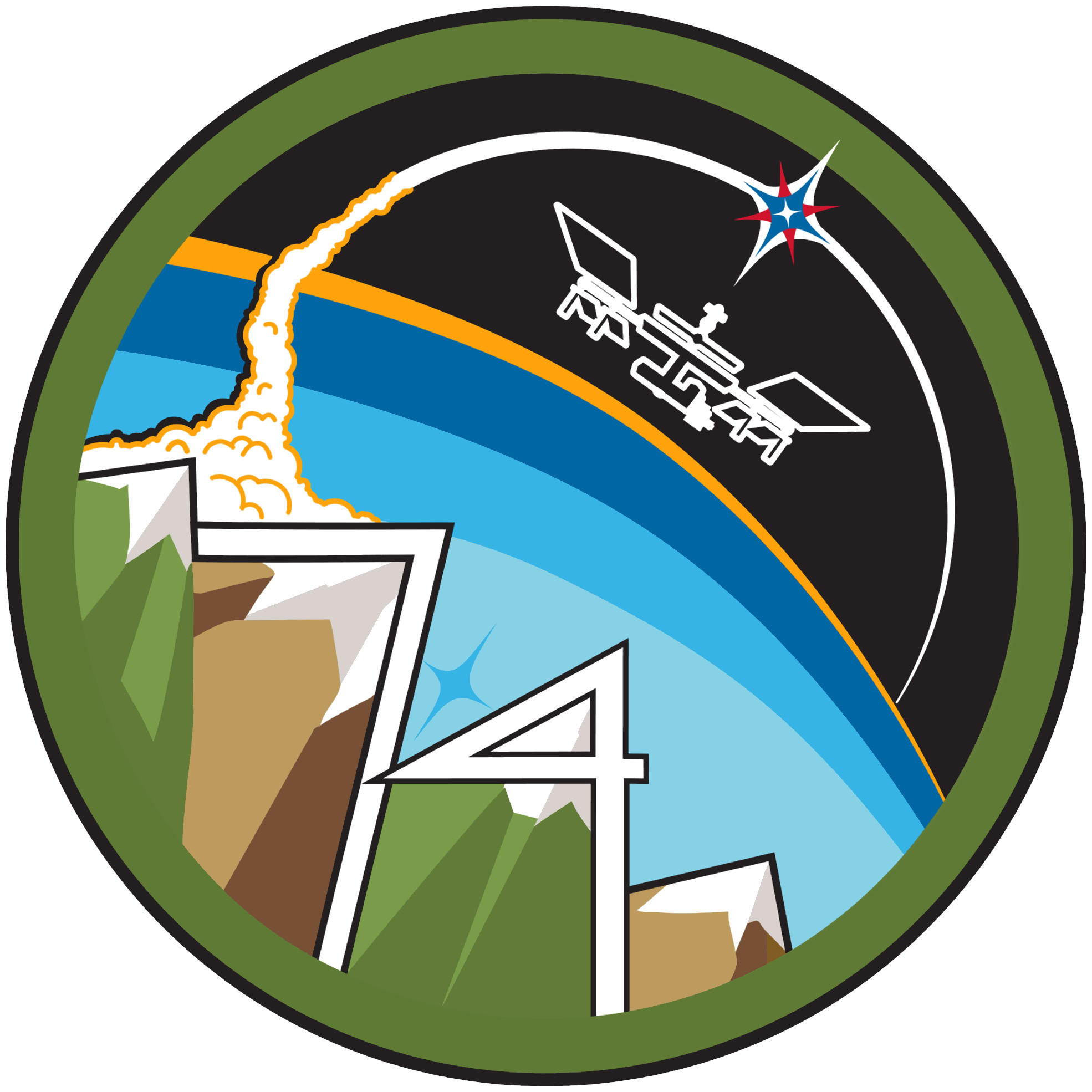
- Mission insignia

Zena Maria Cardman (born October 26, 1987) is an American geobiologist and NASA astronaut.

== Early life and education ==
Cardman was born on October 26, 1987. She received a Bachelor of Science degree in biology from the University of North Carolina at Chapel Hill, where she majored in biology, minored in chemistry and marine sciences, and wrote an honors thesis in creative writing.

Cardman's research took her to remote field sites from the Arctic to the Antarctic and included multiple offshore expeditions on board research ships. While at the University of North Carolina, Cardman studied biogeochemistry in hydrocarbon seeps and hydrothermal vents. During that time, she also worked with the Palmer Long-Term Ecological Research Network in Antarctica. She completed a Master of Science degree with the research group of Dr. Andreas Teske.

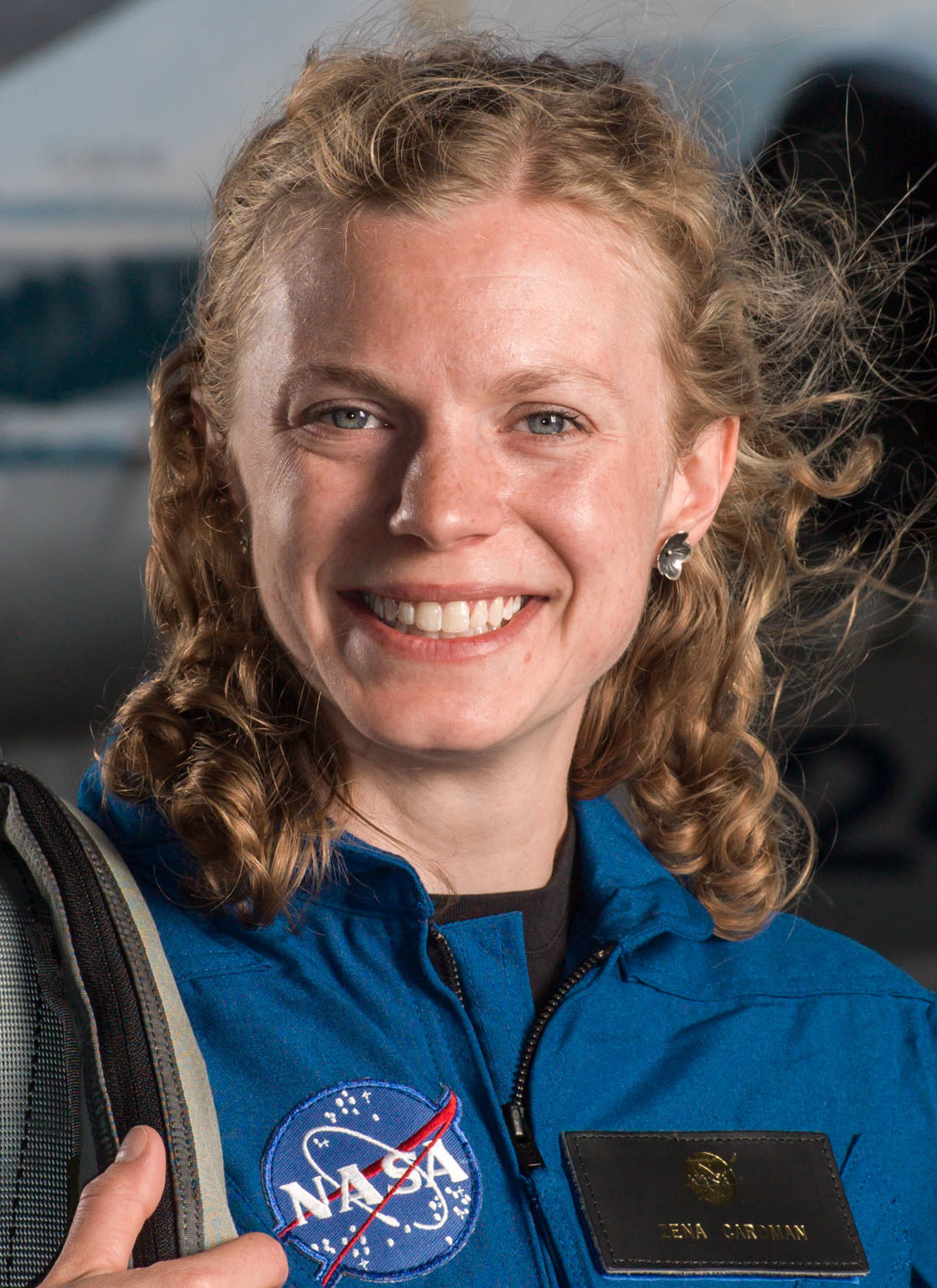
Cardman in 2017

During her early career, Cardman supported NASA research in British Columbia, Idaho, and Hawaii, developing operational architectures for planetary EVA. She has sailed as an assistant engineer with the Sea Education Association, working in the engine room of a brigantine. At the time of her selection in June 2017, Cardman was a National Science Foundation Graduate Research Fellow and Doctoral Candidate in Geosciences at Pennsylvania State University, studying geobiology and novel redox couples in Earth's subsurface.

== NASA career ==
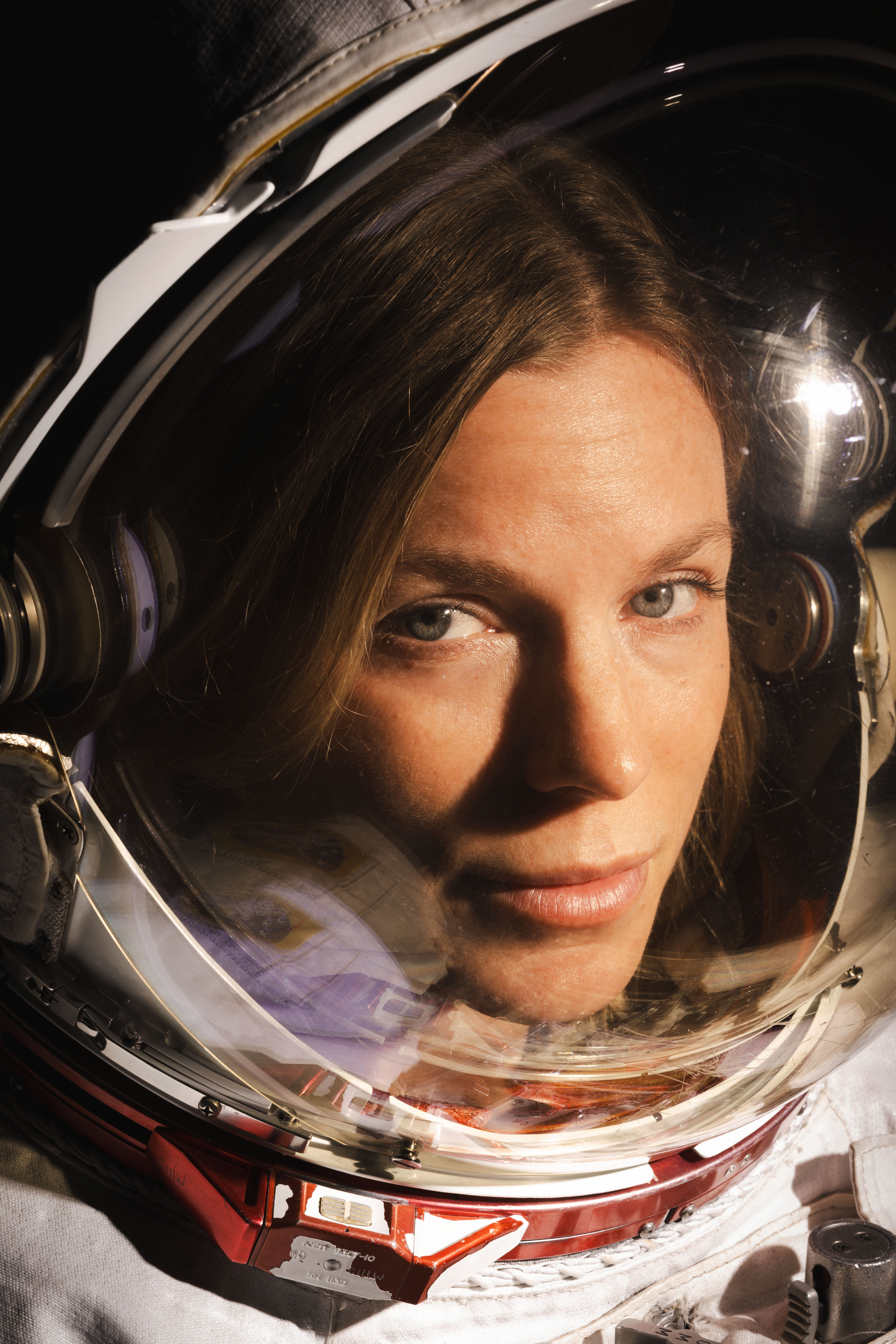
Cardman in an EMU space suit in 2024

Prior to her astronaut candidacy, Cardman worked in science and operations for the NASA Pavilion Lake Research Project (2008–2015) and BASALT (2016–2017). In June 2017, she was selected as a member of NASA Astronaut Group 22 and began her two-year training at Johnson Space Center in Houston.

On January 31, 2024, NASA announced that Cardman would fly as commander of the SpaceX Crew-9 mission to the International Space Station. However, when NASA decided to return the Boeing Starliner capsule on the Boeing Crew Flight Test uncrewed, Cardman was removed from Crew-9, along with mission specialist and fellow astronaut Stephanie Wilson, to make room on the return journey for the Starliner astronauts, Barry E. Wilmore and Sunita Williams. On September 28, 2024, she co-hosted NASA's coverage of the Crew-9 launch, along with NASA communicator Derrol Nail and a brief appearance by Wilson, commenting during the nearly five-hour broadcast at length on the experience that Nick Hague and Roscosmos cosmonaut Aleksandr Gorbunov were going through as they successfully launched from Cape Canaveral Space Force Station in Florida.

On March 27, 2025, Cardman was announced as the commander of the SpaceX Crew-11 mission that launched on August 1, 2025. She conducted research, maintenance, and technology demonstrations aboard the International Space Station. The night prior to a planned spacewalk, Cardman responded to a crewmate's urgent medical situation. This event necessitated the early return of Crew-11, the first "controlled medical evacuation" of the International Space Station. Alongside crewmates Kimiya Yui and Christopher Williams, Cardman received NASA's Exceptional Bravery Medal for "exceptional courage, leadership, and composure that directly contributed to the preservation of a crewmember's life". After 167 days in space, Cardman brought Crew-11 and their Dragon spacecraft home. They safely splashed down on January 15, 2026.

Cardman is currently serving as a branch chief in the Astronaut Office and the supervisor for the 2025 Astronaut Candidate class.

== Personal life ==
Her hobbies include photography, rock climbing, poetry, and power lifting.

== Awards and honors ==
Cardman has received numerous awards, including NASA's Exceptional Bravery Medal, NASA Spaceflight Medal, a National Science Foundation Graduate Research Fellowship, Royster Society Distinguished Graduate Fellowship, Chancellor's Award (UNC Chapel Hill) for Most Outstanding Senior Woman, and Space Grant Consortium Fellowships.
