= Soyuz MS-27 =

2025 Russian crewed spaceflight to the ISS

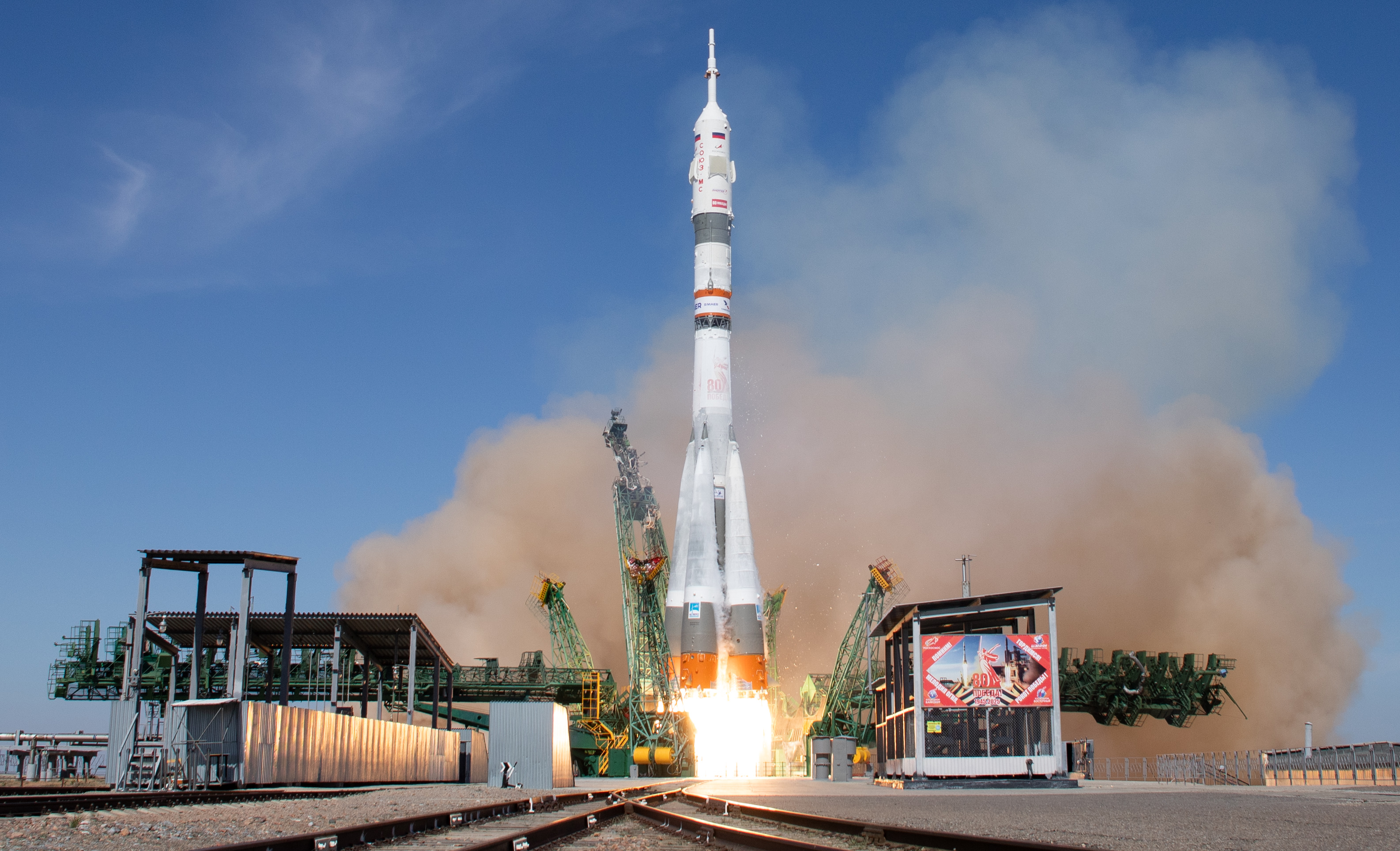
- Soyuz MS-27 launches to the International Space Station atop a Soyuz-2.1a rocket
- Names: ISS 73S
- Mission type: ISS crew transport
- Operator: Roscosmos
- COSPAR ID: 2025-072A
- SATCAT no.: 63520
- Mission duration: 244 days, 23 hours and 16 minutes
- Distance travelled: 167,000,000 km (104,000,000 mi)
- Orbits completed: 3,920

Spacecraft properties
- Spacecraft: Soyuz MS-27 No. 758
- Spacecraft type: Soyuz MS
- Manufacturer: Energia
- Launch mass: 7,152 kg (15,767 lb)

Crew
- Crew size: 3
- Members: Sergey Ryzhikov; Alexey Zubritsky; Jonny Kim
- Callsign: Favor
- Expedition: Expedition 72/73

Start of mission
- Launch date: 8 April 2025, 05:47:15 UTC
- Rocket: Soyuz-2.1a No. K15000-075
- Launch site: Baikonur, Site 31/6
- Contractor: RKTs Progress

End of mission
- Landing date: 9 December 2025, 05:03:33 UTC
- Landing site: Kazakh Steppe, Kazakhstan

Orbital parameters
- Reference system: Geocentric orbit
- Regime: Low Earth orbit

Docking with ISS
- Docking port: Prichal nadir
- Docking date: 8 April 2025, 08:57:43 UTC
- Undocking date: 9 December 2025, 01:41:30 UTC
- Time docked: 244 days, 16 hours and 44 minutes
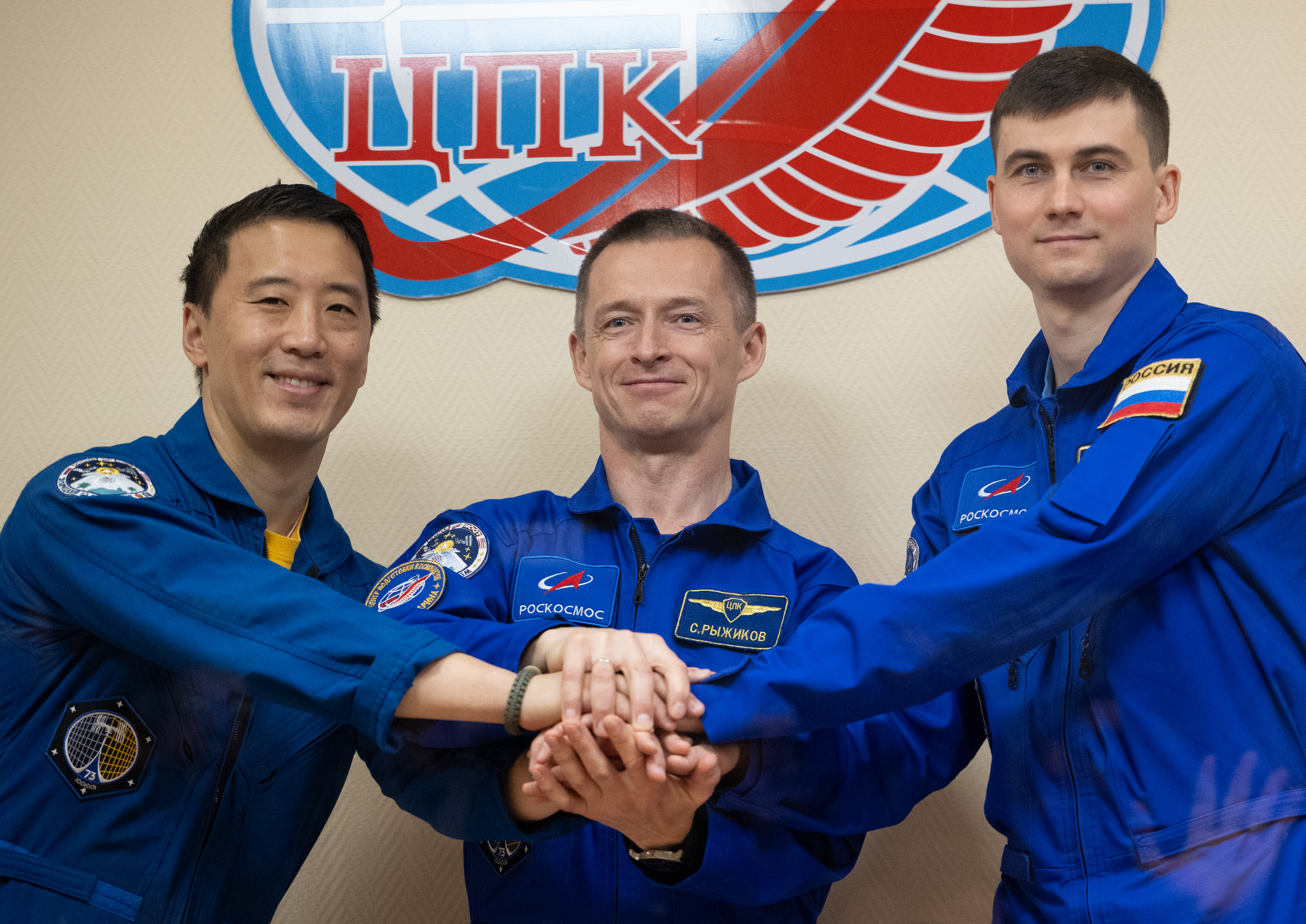
- Mission patch From left: Kim, Ryzhikov and Zubritsky Soyuz programme

Soyuz MS-27, identified by NASA as Soyuz 73S, was a Russian crewed Soyuz spaceflight that launched on 8 April 2025 from Site 31/6 at the Baikonur Cosmodrome, bound for the International Space Station. The spacecraft was launched aboard a Soyuz-2.1a rocket carrying three crew members, Roscosmos cosmonauts Sergey Ryzhikov and Alexey Zubritsky, along with NASA astronaut Jonny Kim.

== Mission ==
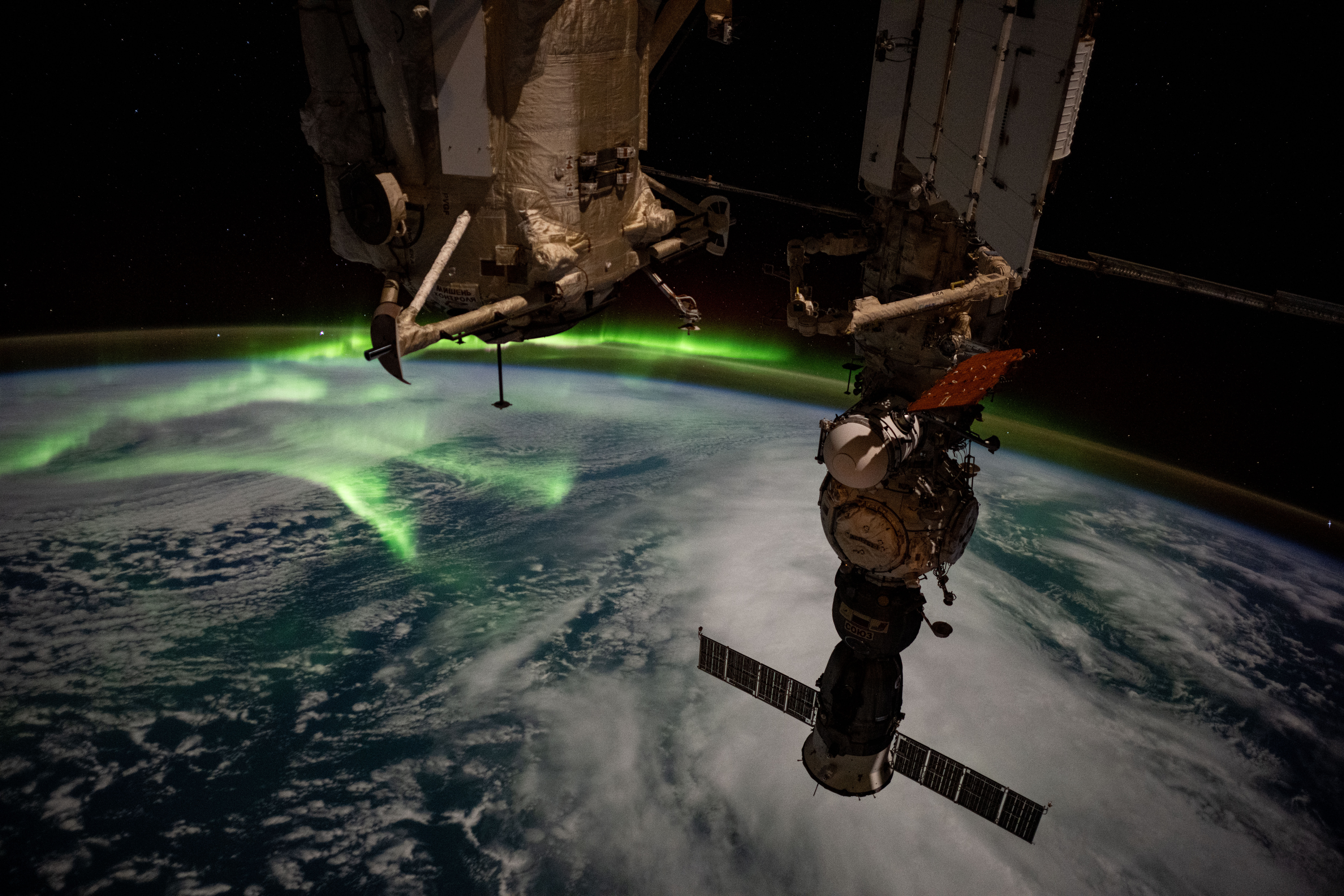
Soyuz MS-27, is docked to the Prichal module, as the aurora australis arcs back and forth above a partly cloudy Indian Ocean in the distance

The Soyuz MS-27 spacecraft, assembled by Energia, was transported by rail from its manufacturing facility in Korolev, Russia, to the Baikonur Cosmodrome in Kazakhstan, arriving in December 2024. Final testing and processing commenced in mid-January 2025.

Meanwhile, the components for the Soyuz-2.1a rocket were manufactured by RKTs Progress in Samara, Russia, and shipped by rail to Baikonur, where assembly was underway by the end of January.

Final spacecraft preparations resumed in early March. On 24 March, both the primary and backup crews conducted a fit check of their Sokol launch and entry suits and participated in familiarization training inside the flight-ready spacecraft. Propellant loading was completed on 25 March, followed shortly by cargo loading. On 27 March, Soyuz MS-27 was mated to its launch vehicle adapter.

Additional crew training took place on 2 April, as members of Expedition 73 completed their final onboard exercises inside the fully assembled Soyuz MS-27. The following day, the payload section—including the spacecraft—was transported from the processing facility to the vehicle assembly building at Site 31/6, where it was integrated with the Soyuz-2.1a rocket. Integration was completed on 4 April. On the morning of 5 April, the fully assembled launch vehicle was rolled out to the launch pad at Site 31/6. The rocket was decorated with decals to celebrate the 80th anniversary of the end of World War II.

Three days later on 8 April at 05:47:15 UTC, Soyuz MS-27 lifted off atop a Soyuz-2.1a rocket from the Baikonur Cosmodrome as scheduled. After an 8-minute, 49-second ascent, the third stage engine cutoff occurred, and the Soyuz MS-27 was released into its initial orbit three seconds later. The spacecraft proceeded with a fast-track rendezvous and successfully docked to the nadir port of the Prichal module at 08:57:43 UTC just 3 hours, 10 minutes, and 28 seconds after launch. The crew entered the station at 09:28 UTC.

== Crew ==
Prime crew
Position	Crew
Commander	Sergey Ryzhikov, Roscosmos; Expedition 72/73; Third spaceflight
Flight engineer	Alexey Zubritsky, Roscosmos; Expedition 72/73; First spaceflight
Flight engineer	Jonny Kim, NASA; Expedition 72/73; Only spaceflight

Backup crew
Position	Crew
Commander	Sergey Kud-Sverchkov, Roscosmos
Flight engineer	Sergey Mikayev, Roscosmos
Flight engineer	Christopher Williams, NASA
