= Progress MS-33 =

Russian resupply spaceflight to the ISS

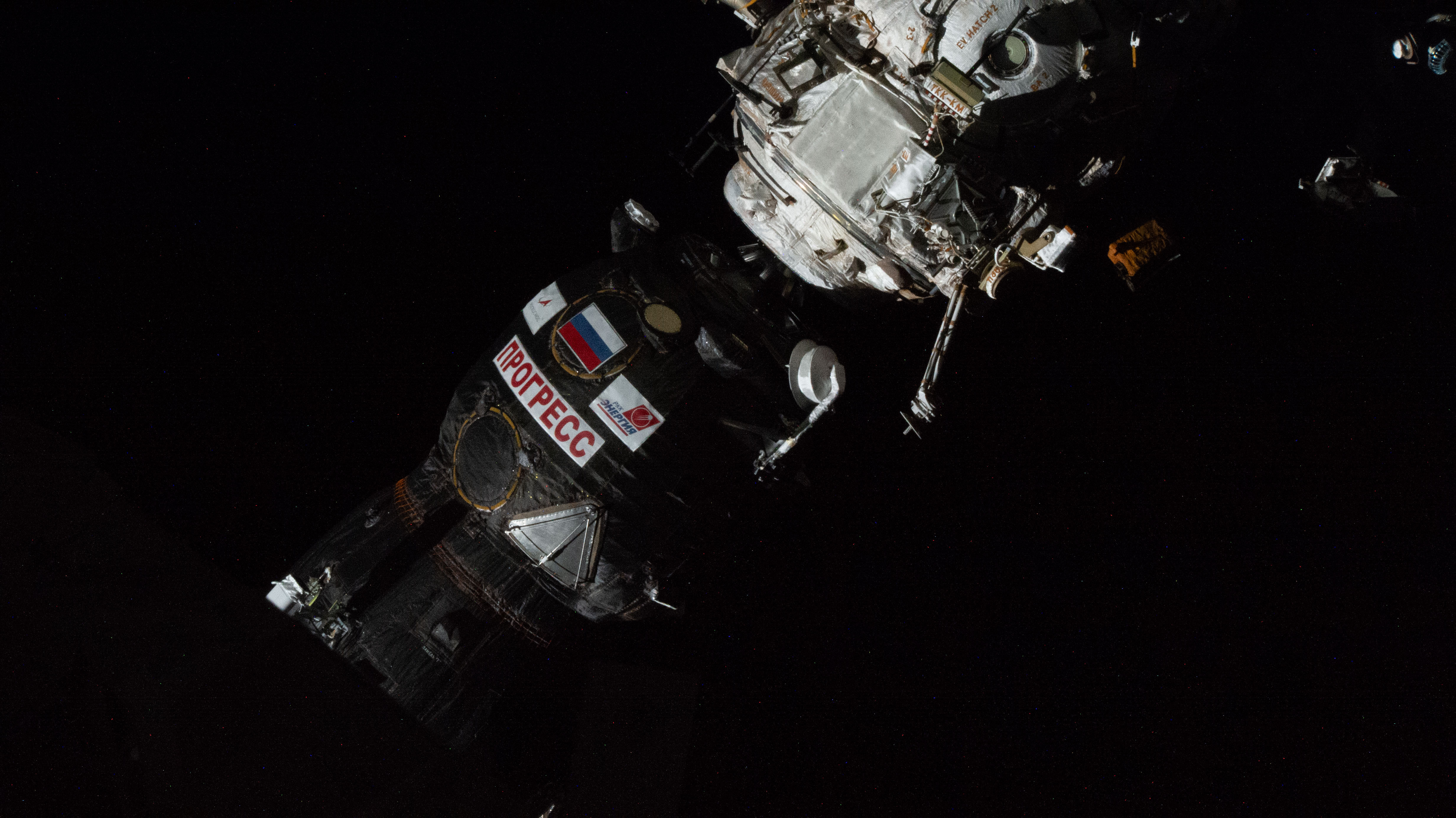
- Progress MS-33 docks with the Poisk module, with its Kurs docking antenna (white, centre) still stowed
- Names: Progress 94; ISS 94P
- Mission type: ISS resupply
- Operator: Roscosmos
- COSPAR ID: 2026-058A
- SATCAT no.: 68319
- Mission duration: 169 days, 6 hours and 27 minutes

Spacecraft properties
- Spacecraft: Progress MS-33 No. 463
- Spacecraft type: Progress MS
- Manufacturer: Energia
- Launch mass: 7,280 kg (16,050 lb)

Start of mission
- Launch date: 22 March 2026, 11:59:51 UTC
- Rocket: Soyuz-2.1a
- Launch site: Baikonur, Site 31/6
- Contractor: RKTs Progress

End of mission
- Disposal: Deorbited
- Decay date: 7 September 2026, 18:27 UTC

Orbital parameters
- Reference system: Geocentric orbit
- Regime: Low Earth orbit
- Inclination: 51.65°

Docking with ISS
- Docking port: Poisk zenith
- Docking date: 24 March 2026, 13:40:47 UTC
- Undocking date: 7 September 2026, 15:18 UTC
- Time docked: 167 days, 1 hour and 37 minutes

Cargo
- Mass: 2,509 kg (5,531 lb)
- Pressurised: 1,211 kg (2,670 lb)
- Fuel: 828 kg (1,825 lb)
- Gaseous: 50 kg (110 lb)
- Water: 420 kg (930 lb)

Progress MS-33 (Russian: Прогресс МC-33), Russian production No. 463, identified by NASA as Progress 94, was a Progress cargo spacecraft mission by Roscosmos to resupply the International Space Station (ISS). It is the 186th flight of a Progress spacecraft and was originally scheduled to launch in late 2025, but was delayed to 22 March 2026 due to damage at Baikonur Cosmodrome Site 31 following the launch of Soyuz MS-28.

== Mission ==
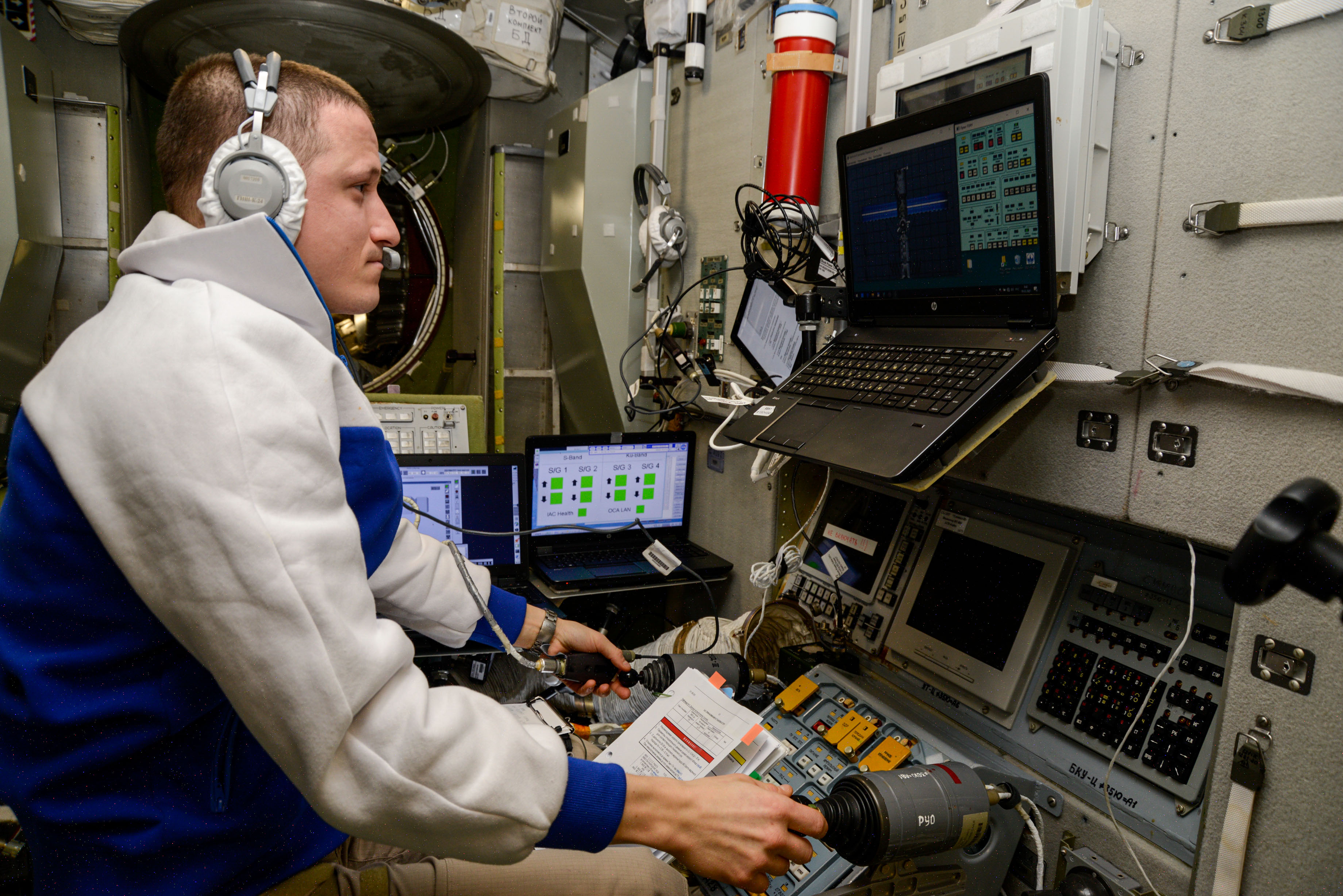
Kud-Sverchkov practices using the TORU equipment during a prior mission.

Progress MS-33 was scheduled to launch on 19 December 2025 and after a two-day free flight, dock with the zenith (space-facing) port of the ISS's Poisk module.

However, Site 31 at the Baikonur Cosmodrome was severely damaged during the launch of Soyuz MS-28, with the mobile service platform beneath the pad appearing to collapse into the flame trench. The extent of the damage temporarily rendered Russia's only operational crewed launch facility unusable. Roscosmos officials subsequently told NASA that repairs to the site and restoration of launch capability were expected to take at least four months. As a result, the next planned launch from the site — the Progress MS-33 cargo mission originally scheduled for late December — was delayed to no earlier than March. Repairs to Site 31 were completed on 3 March 2026.

In response to the disruption, NASA adjusted its cargo resupply schedule to the ISS. The agency moved the CRS SpX-34 forward by one month, from June 2026 to May, and advanced the subsequent CRS SpX-35 by three months, from November to August. NASA indicated that the changes were intended to ensure adequate food, water, oxygen, and other critical supplies aboard the station in the event of further delays to visiting Progress vehicles.

Progress MS-33 was launched on 22 March 2026 at 11:59 UTC (16:59 local time in Baikonur). After the launch, NASA reported that one of the spacecraft's two rendezvous antennas failed to deploy, preventing use of the fully automated Kurs docking navigation system. Instead, Progress automatically flew itself to a position 200 metres (660 ft) away from the ISS. From there, cosmonaut Sergey Kud-Sverchkov used the TORU manual control system to guide the vehicle to docking.

== Cargo ==
Each Progress mission delivers pressurised and unpressurized cargo to the station. The pressurised section carries consumables such as food, along with equipment for maintenance and scientific research. The unpressurized section contains tanks of fuel, drinking water, and gases to replenish the onboard atmosphere, which are transferred to the station through automated systems.

For this mission, Progress MS-33 carried a total of 2,509 kg (5,531 lb) of cargo and supplies, including:

- Pressurized supplies: 1,211 kg (2,670 lb), including:
  - 619 kg (1,365 lb) of food
  - 393 kg (866 lb) of equipment for repair and maintenance
  - 135 kg (298 lb) of hygiene supplies
  - 52 kg (115 lb) of equipment for scientific experiments
  - 12 kg (26 lb) of medical equipment
- Fuel: 828 kg (1,825 lb)
- Drinking water: 420 kg (930 lb)
- Oxygen gas: 50 kg (110 lb)

== See also ==
- Uncrewed spaceflights to the International Space Station
- List of Progress missions
