= Sergey Kud-Sverchkov =

Russian engineer and cosmonaut (born 1983)

- Сергей Кудь-Сверчков
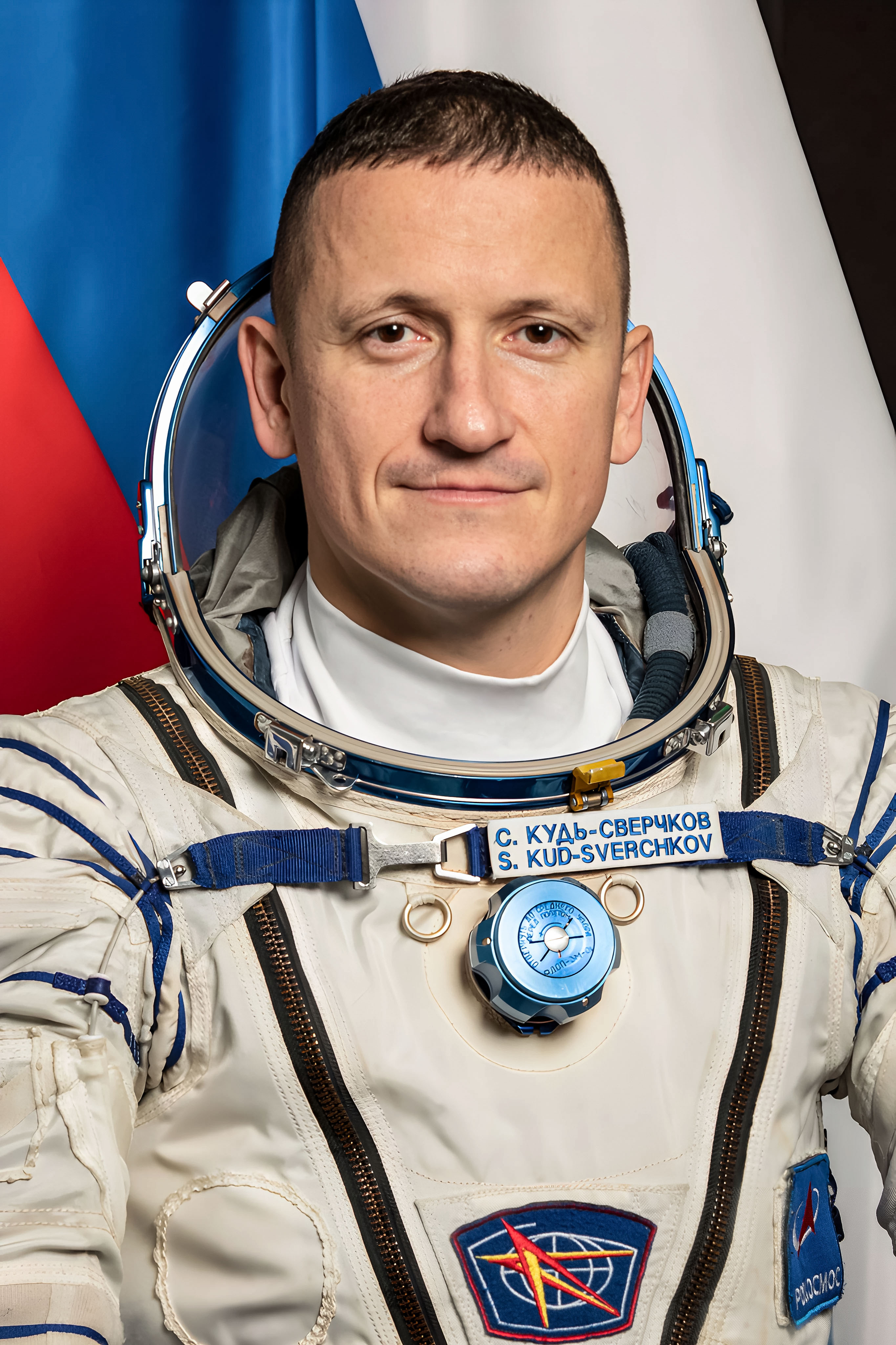
- Kud-Sverchkov in 2024
- Born: Sergey Vladimirovich Kud-Sverchkov; 23 August 1983 (age 43); Baikonur, Kazakh SSR, Soviet Union
- Education: Moscow State Technical University
- Awards: Hero of the Russian Federation
- Space career

Roscosmos cosmonaut
- Current occupation: Test cosmonaut
- Previous occupation: Engineer for Energia
- Status: Active
- Time in space: 426 days and 9 minutes
- Selection: RKKE-17 Cosmonaut Group (2010)
- Total EVAs: 2
- Total EVA time: 12 hours, 53 minutes
- Missions: Soyuz MS-17 (Expedition 63/64); Soyuz MS-28 (Expedition 73/74)
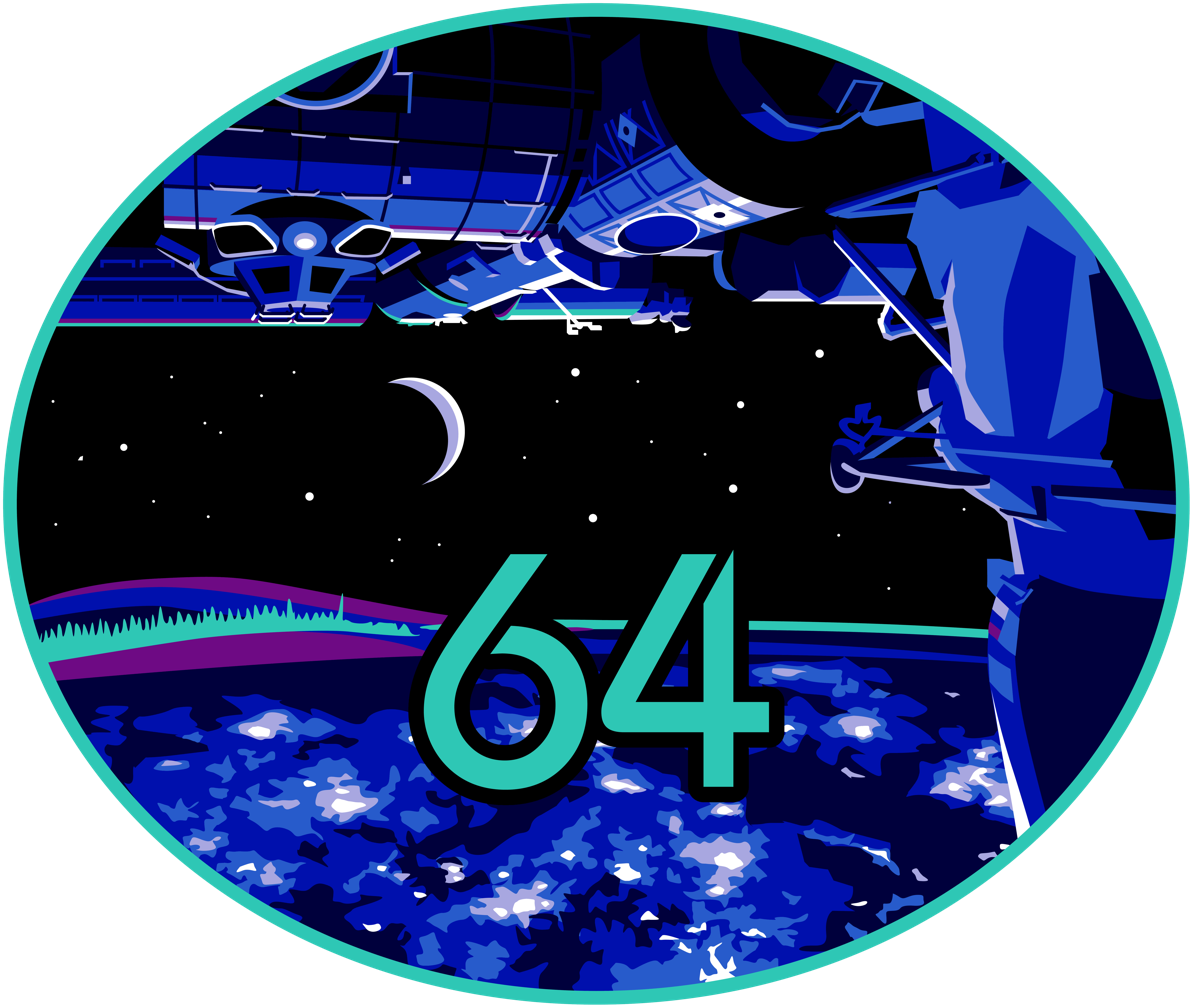
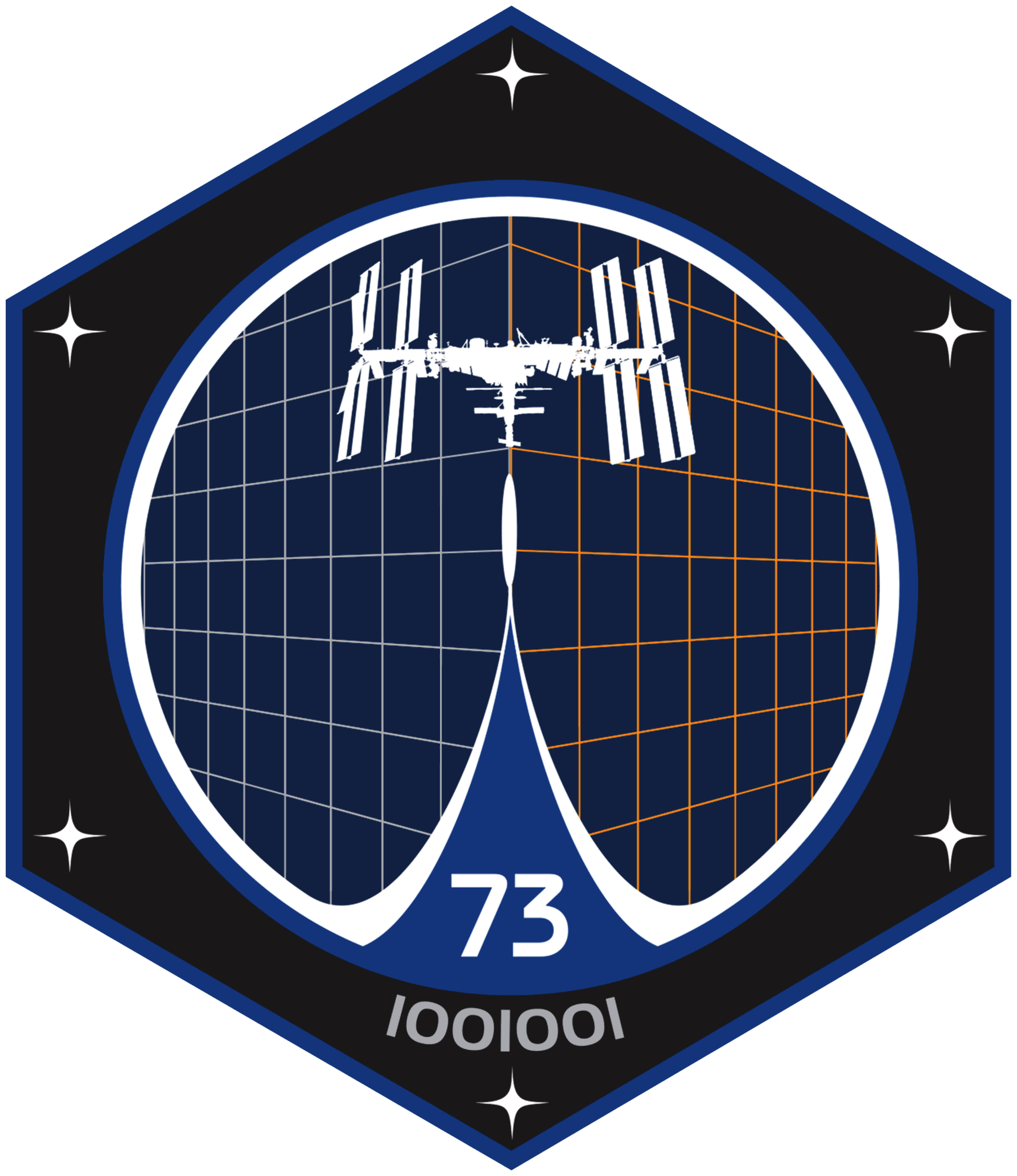
- Mission insignia

Sergey Vladimirovich Kud-Sverchkov (Russian: Серге́й Влади́мирович Кудь-Сверчко́в; born on 23 August 1983) is a Russian cosmonaut, selected in 2010 by Roscosmos. He made his first spaceflight in 2020 aboard the International Space Station as a flight engineer for ISS Expedition 63/64. During his second spaceflight, spanning Expeditions 73 and 74, he served as commander of the ISS from 12 January to 25 July 2026.

== Career ==
In 2006, Kud-Sverchkov graduated with honours from Moscow State Technical University with a degree specializing in rocket engineering.

Sergey Kud-Sverchkov worked as an engineer at RSC Energia from August 2006 until being selected to become a cosmonaut in April 2010 with another engineer of RSC Energia, Andrei Babkin.

== Cosmonaut career ==
Following his selection, Kud-Sverchkov began approximately two years of training from which he graduated in August 2012, becoming available for assignment to a long-duration flight to the International Space Station.

In 2014, he participated in the ESA CAVES mission of the European Space Agency alongside Scott Tingle, Alexander Mirsurkin, Luca Parmitano and Matthias Maurer.

He also participated in the ESA PANGAEA program in November 2018. This was the third mission of the Pangaea program. Kud-Sverchkov and veteran ESA astronaut Thomas Reiter went to the Ries Crater in Germany, the Italian Dolomites and the volcanic landscapes of Lanzarote, Spain. ESA's Pangaea program prepares astronauts and space engineers to identify planetary geological features for future missions to the Moon, Mars and asteroids.

=== Expedition 63/64 ===
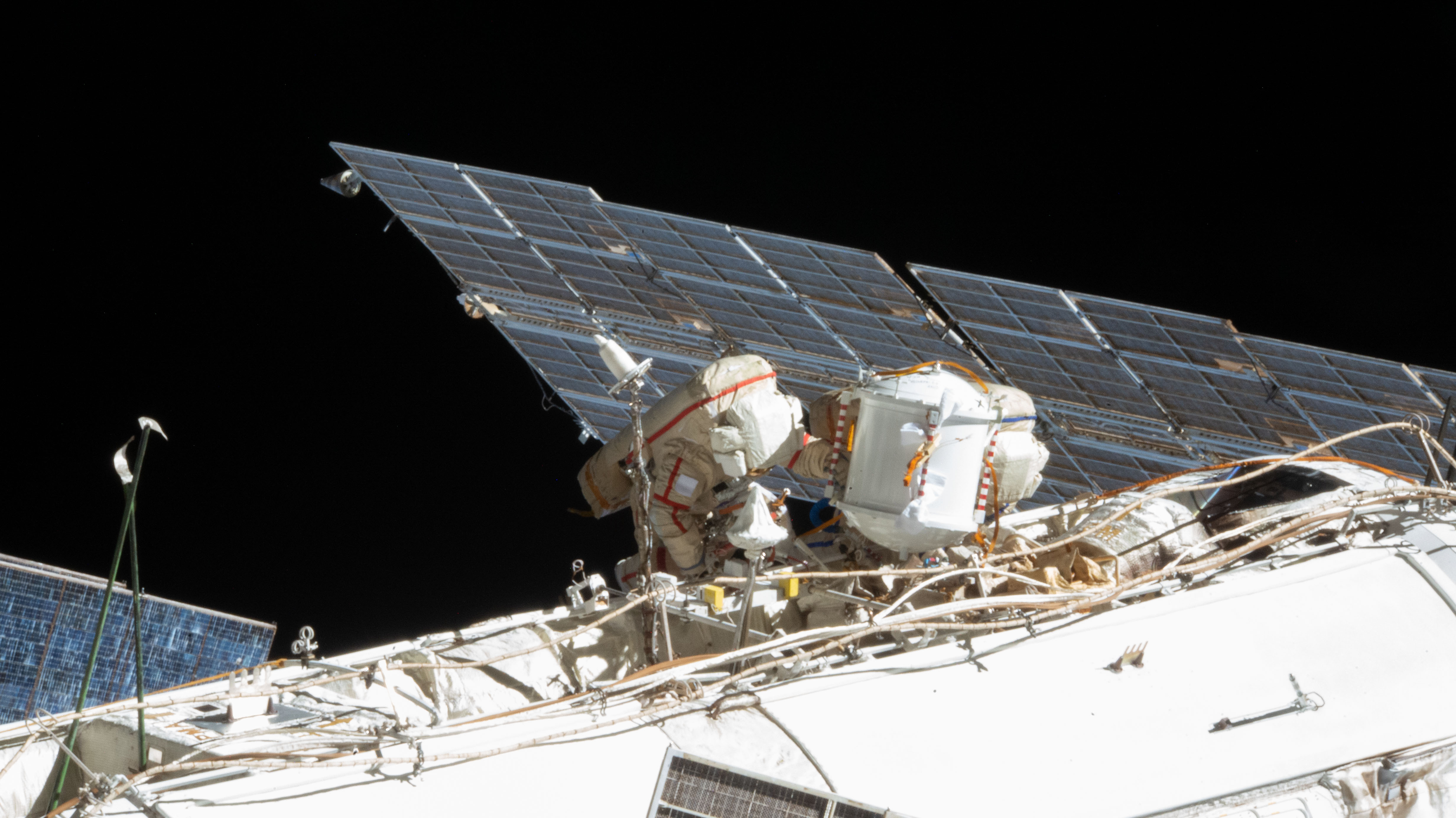
Kud-Sverchkov (right) and Ryzhikov on spacewalk.

In May 2020, Kud-Sverchkov was assigned to ISS Expedition 63/64 as a flight engineer. He launched aboard Soyuz MS-17 on 14 October 2020 alongside Russian cosmonaut Sergey Ryzhikov, commander of the Soyuz MS spacecraft, and NASA astronaut Kathleen Rubins.

The Soyuz MS-17 followed a 2-orbit rendezvous and docking procedure to dock with the Rassvet module of the ISS 3 hours and 3 minutes after launch. This was the first time a crew reached the ISS in less than 4 orbits and approximately 6 hours.

On the 18th of November 2020, Kud-Sverchkov, wearing the Orlan MKS-N°4 suit, performed his first spacewalk with his crewmate Sergey Ryzhikov. The spacewalk begin at 15:12 UTC and finished after 6 hours and 48 minutes. The tasks were a leak tightness check for the exit hatch in Poisk, replacement of the liquid flow regulator's removable panel on Zarya (aborted because of a "bulky bolt"), work on scientific equipment, commutation of the Tranzit-B antenna on Pirs to the Poisk module (to ensure continuity of communications with the Orlan suits), and changing the position of sensors for the precipitation and pressure control unit on the Poisk module.

On the 19th of March 2021, he and his Soyuz crew mate performed a relocation of their Soyuz from the Rassvet module to the Poisk to let Rassvet for the Soyuz MS-18 schedule to arrive at the station on the 9th of April 2021. The ride lasted 34 minutes and was performed manually by Soyuz commander, Sergey Ryzhikov.

They returned to Earth on 17 April 2021 after almost 185 days in orbit.

=== Expedition 73/74 ===
In May 2023, he was assigned to the crew of Soyuz MS-28, along with Sergey Mikayev and Christopher Williams. The crew launched on 27 November 2025 and returned on 26 July 2026.

Preceded by Michael Fincke	ISS Commander (Expedition 74); 12 January 2026 to 25 July 2026	Succeeded by Jessica Meir
