= Christopher Williams (astronaut) =

American medical physicist and astronaut (born 1983)

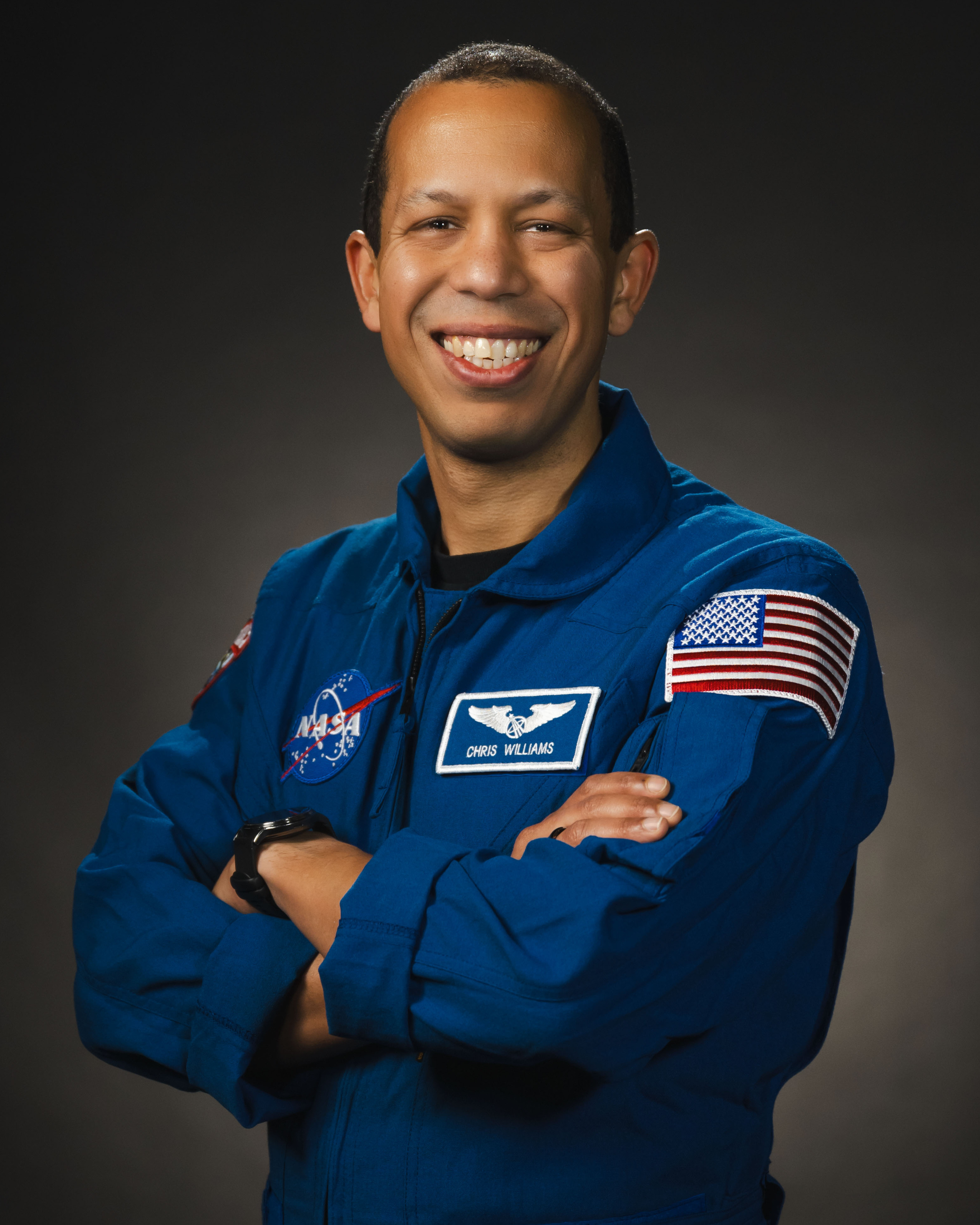
- Williams in February 2024
- Born: Christopher Leigh Williams; October 23, 1983 (age 43); New York City, New York, U.S.
- Education: Stanford University (BS); Massachusetts Institute of Technology (PhD)
- Family: Juan Williams (uncle)
- Space career

NASA astronaut
- Time in space: 241 days and 59 minutes
- Selection: NASA Group 23 (2021)
- Total EVAs: 2
- Total EVA time: 14 hours, 22 minutes
- Mission: Soyuz MS-28 (Expedition 73/74)
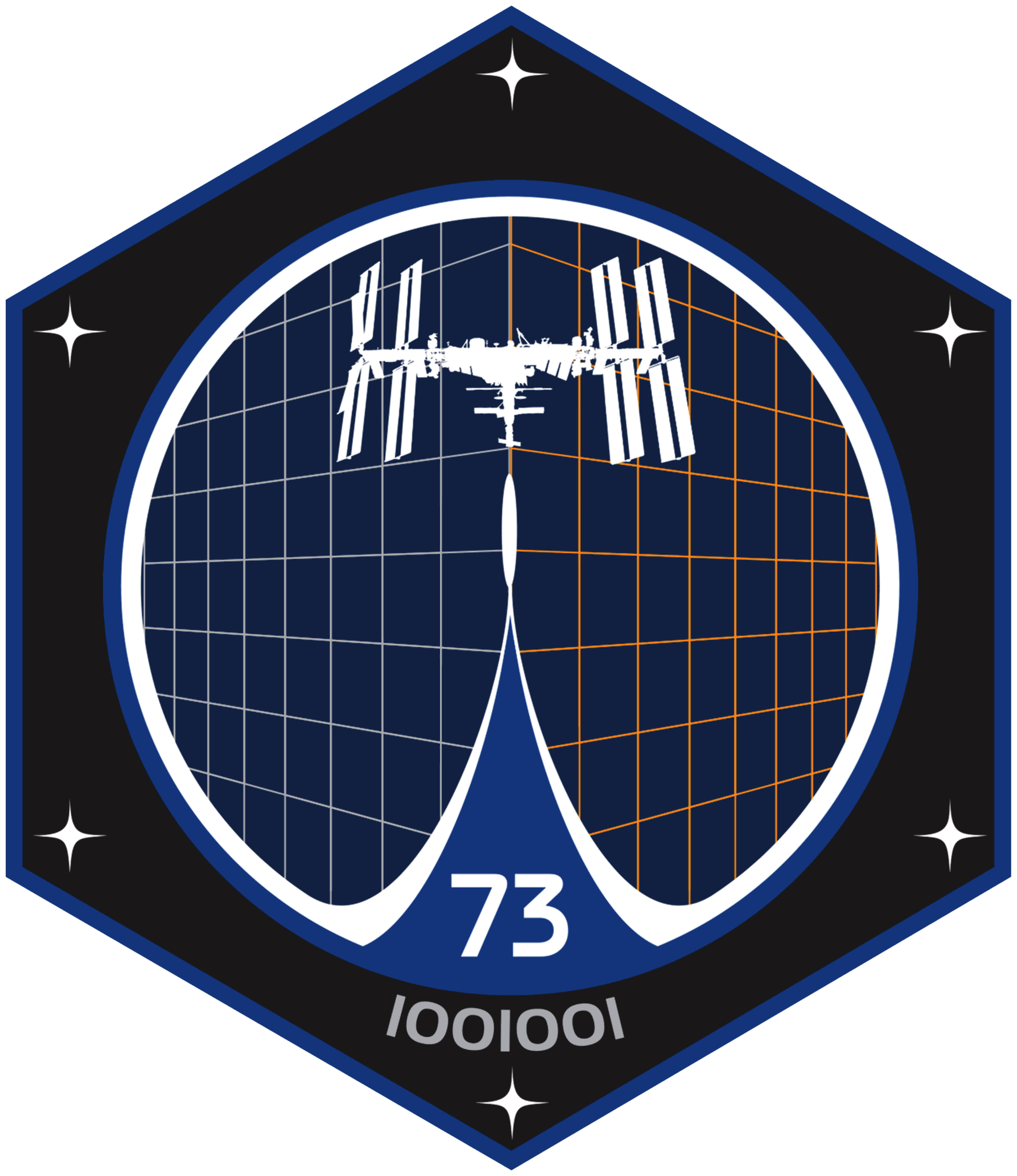
- Mission insignia
- Scientific career
- Fields: Physics
- Thesis: Initial Exploration of 21-cm Cosmology with Imaging and Power Spectra from the Murchison Widefield Array (2012)
- Doctoral advisor: Jacqueline Hewitt

Christopher Leigh Williams (born October 23, 1983) is an American medical physicist and NASA astronaut.

Williams holds a Ph.D. in physics from the Massachusetts Institute of Technology. Board-certified in medical physics, he has worked at Harvard Medical School, Brigham and Women's Hospital, and the Dana–Farber Cancer Institute, where he led efforts in MRI-guided radiation therapy for cancer treatment.

NASA selected Williams to be an astronaut in 2021. He flew aboard the International Space Station on his first mission: serving as a flight engineer contributing to scientific investigations and technology demonstrations for Expedition 73/74. He traveled to the space station aboard Soyuz MS-28 in November 2025 and returned in July 2026.

== Early life and education ==
Williams was born in New York City on October 23, 1983, and considers Potomac, Maryland, his hometown. He graduated from Montgomery Blair High School in Silver Spring, Maryland in 2001, and earned a Bachelor of Science degree in physics from Stanford University in 2005. He received a Ph.D. in physics from the Massachusetts Institute of Technology (MIT) in 2012, where his research focused on astrophysics and radio cosmology.

As a graduate student at MIT, Williams was awarded the Bruno Rossi Fellowship and a Ford Foundation Predoctoral Fellowship in 2006. He received the American Astronomical Society’s Beth Brown Memorial Award in 2009. His doctoral research involved developing radio telescope instrumentation and data processing techniques to study the early universe. He was part of the team that built the Murchison Widefield Array, a low-frequency radio telescope in Western Australia designed to observe the epoch of reionization. His dissertation, titled Initial Exploration of 21-cm Cosmology with Imaging and Power Spectra from the Murchison Widefield Array, was supervised by astrophysicist Jacqueline Hewitt.

== Career ==
During high school and college, Williams worked at the United States Naval Research Laboratory in Washington, D.C., where he studied supernovae using the Very Large Array radio telescope. He also volunteered as an emergency medical technician and firefighter with the Rockville Volunteer Fire Department in Montgomery County, Maryland.

After his doctoral work, Williams completed residency training at the Harvard Medical Physics Residency Program in 2015. He later joined the faculty at Harvard Medical School as an assistant professor and clinical physicist. He worked in the Department of Radiation Oncology at Brigham and Women's Hospital and the Dana–Farber Cancer Institute, where he served as lead physicist for the institute’s MRI-guided adaptive radiation therapy program. His research focused on developing new image guidance techniques for cancer treatment.

In 2017, Williams received the Brigham Research Institute Innovator Award for his contributions to radiation oncology. He is a member of the American Association of Physicists in Medicine.

== NASA ==
Williams was selected by NASA as an astronaut candidate in December 2021 and reported for training in January 2022. He completed two years of initial training as part of the 2021 astronaut class.

Williams launched aboard the Soyuz MS-28 spacecraft in November 2025, serving as a flight engineer and member of Expedition 73/74 to the International Space Station. He was joined by Roscosmos cosmonauts Sergey Kud-Sverchkov and Sergey Mikayev on the Soyuz flight. The mission launched from the Baikonur Cosmodrome in Kazakhstan and lasted about eight months. Williams was the first person of African descent to fly on Soyuz since Arnaldo Tamayo Méndez flew on Soyuz 38 in 1980. He returned to Earth in July 2026.

== Personal life ==
Williams is married to Aubrey Samost-Williams of North Reading, Massachusetts. They have two daughters. His parents are Roger Williams and Ginger Macomber of Potomac, Maryland. He is of Panamanian descent. He is an Eagle Scout, a private pilot, and enjoys hiking, camping, cooking, and traveling.
