= Progress MS-34 =

Russian resupply spaceflight to the ISS

- Names: Progress 95; ISS 95P
- Mission type: ISS resupply
- Operator: Roscosmos
- COSPAR ID: 2026-093A
- SATCAT no.: 68837
- Mission duration: 184 days, 16 hours and 21 minutes (in progress)

Spacecraft properties
- Spacecraft: Progress MS-34 No. 464
- Spacecraft type: Progress MS
- Manufacturer: Energia
- Launch mass: 7,280 kg (16,050 lb)

Start of mission
- Launch date: 25 April 2026, 22:21:47 UTC
- Rocket: Soyuz-2.1a
- Launch site: Baikonur, Site 31/6
- Contractor: RKTs Progress

End of mission
- Disposal: Deorbited (planned)
- Decay date: 22 November 2026 (planned)

Orbital parameters
- Reference system: Geocentric orbit
- Regime: Low Earth orbit
- Inclination: 51.65°

Docking with ISS
- Docking port: Zvezda aft
- Docking date: 28 April 2026, 00:00:46 UTC
- Undocking date: 22 November 2026 (planned)
- Time docked: 182 days, 14 hours and 42 minutes (in progress)

Cargo
- Mass: 2,518 kg (5,551 lb)
- Pressurised: 1,348 kg (2,972 lb)
- Fuel: 700 kg (1,500 lb)
- Gaseous: 50 kg (110 lb)
- Water: 420 kg (930 lb)

Progress MS-34 (Russian: Прогресс МC-34), Russian production No. 464, identified by NASA as Progress 95, is a Progress cargo spacecraft mission by Roscosmos to resupply the International Space Station (ISS). It is the 187th flight of a Progress spacecraft. It was launched on 25 April 2026 and docked to the aft port of the Zvezda module on 28 April 2026.

== Cargo ==
Each Progress mission delivers pressurized and unpressurized cargo to the station. The pressurized section carries consumables such as food, along with equipment for maintenance and scientific research. The unpressurized section contains tanks of fuel, drinking water, and gases to replenish the onboard atmosphere, which are transferred to the station through automated systems.

For this mission, Progress MS-34 carried a total of 2,518 kg (5,551 lb) of cargo and supplies, including:

- Pressurized supplies: 1,348 kg (2,972 lb), including:
  - 483 kg (1,065 lb) of food
  - 311 kg (686 lb) of equipment for repair and maintenance
  - 333 kg (734 lb) of hygiene supplies
  - 146 kg (322 lb) of equipment for scientific experiments
  - 75 kg (165 lb) of medical equipment
- Fuel: 700 kg (1,500 lb)
- Drinking water: 420 kg (930 lb)
- Oxygen gas: 50 kg (110 lb)

Progress MS-34 carries the eighth unit of the Orlan-MKS space suit to the ISS. The science payloads carried aboard include experiments about virtual reality, effects of stress on the immune and nervous systems, bone mass loss, effects of microbes on materials, and water regeneration.

== See also ==
- Uncrewed spaceflights to the International Space Station
- List of Progress missions
