= Sergei Mikayev =

Russian cosmonaut (born 1986)

- Сергей Микаев
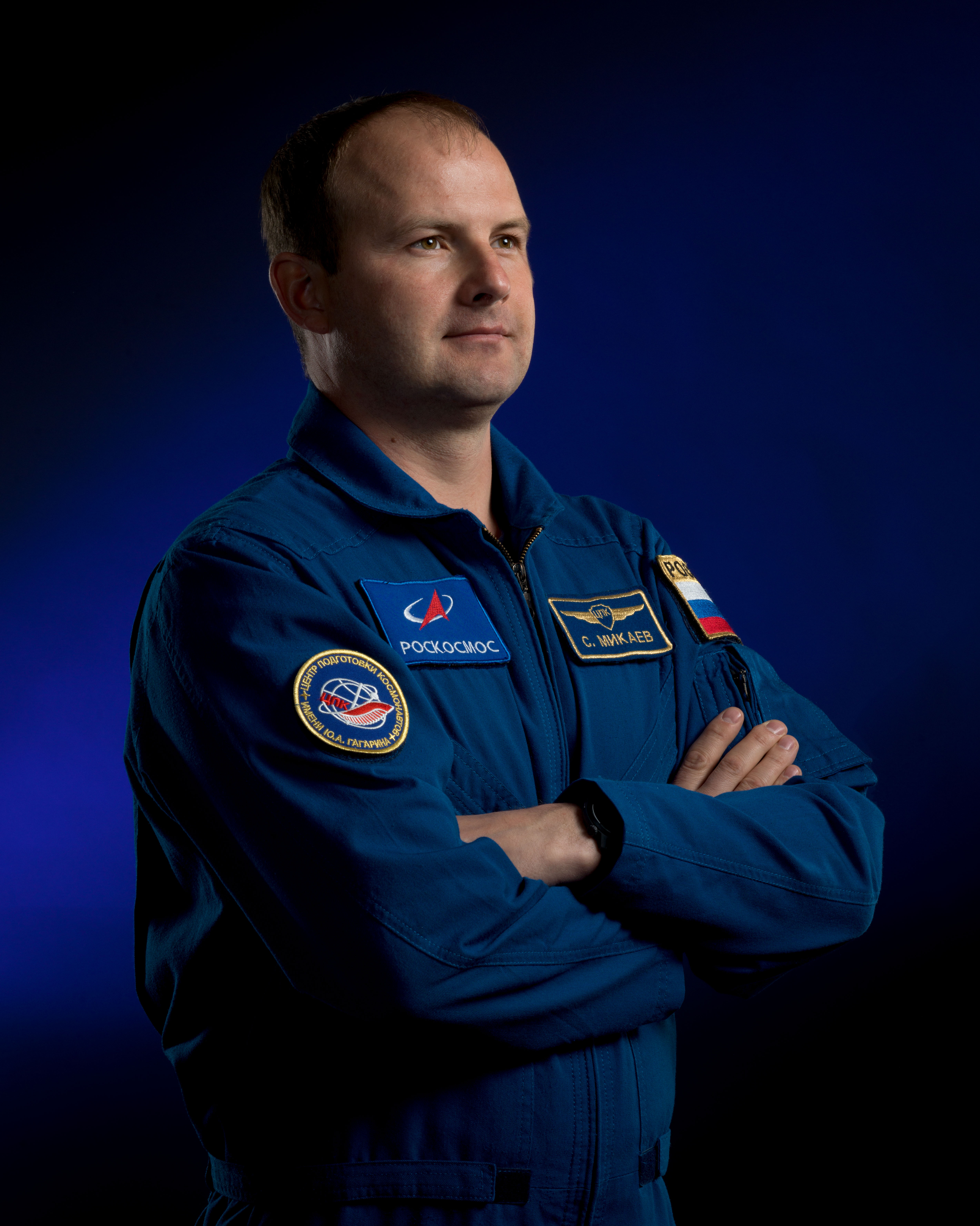
- Mikayev in 2024
- Born: Sergei Nikolayevich Mikayev; 15 August 1986 (age 40); Irkutsk, Russian SFSR, Soviet Union
- Education: Krasnodar Higher Military Aviation School of Pilots
- Space career

Roscosmos cosmonaut
- Current occupation: Test cosmonaut
- Previous occupation: Military pilot
- Status: Active
- Rank: Major, Russian Air Force
- Time in space: 241 days and 59 minutes
- Selection: 17th Cosmonaut Group (2018)
- Total EVAs: 1
- Total EVA time: 6 hours, 5 minutes
- Missions: Soyuz MS-28 (Expedition 73/74)
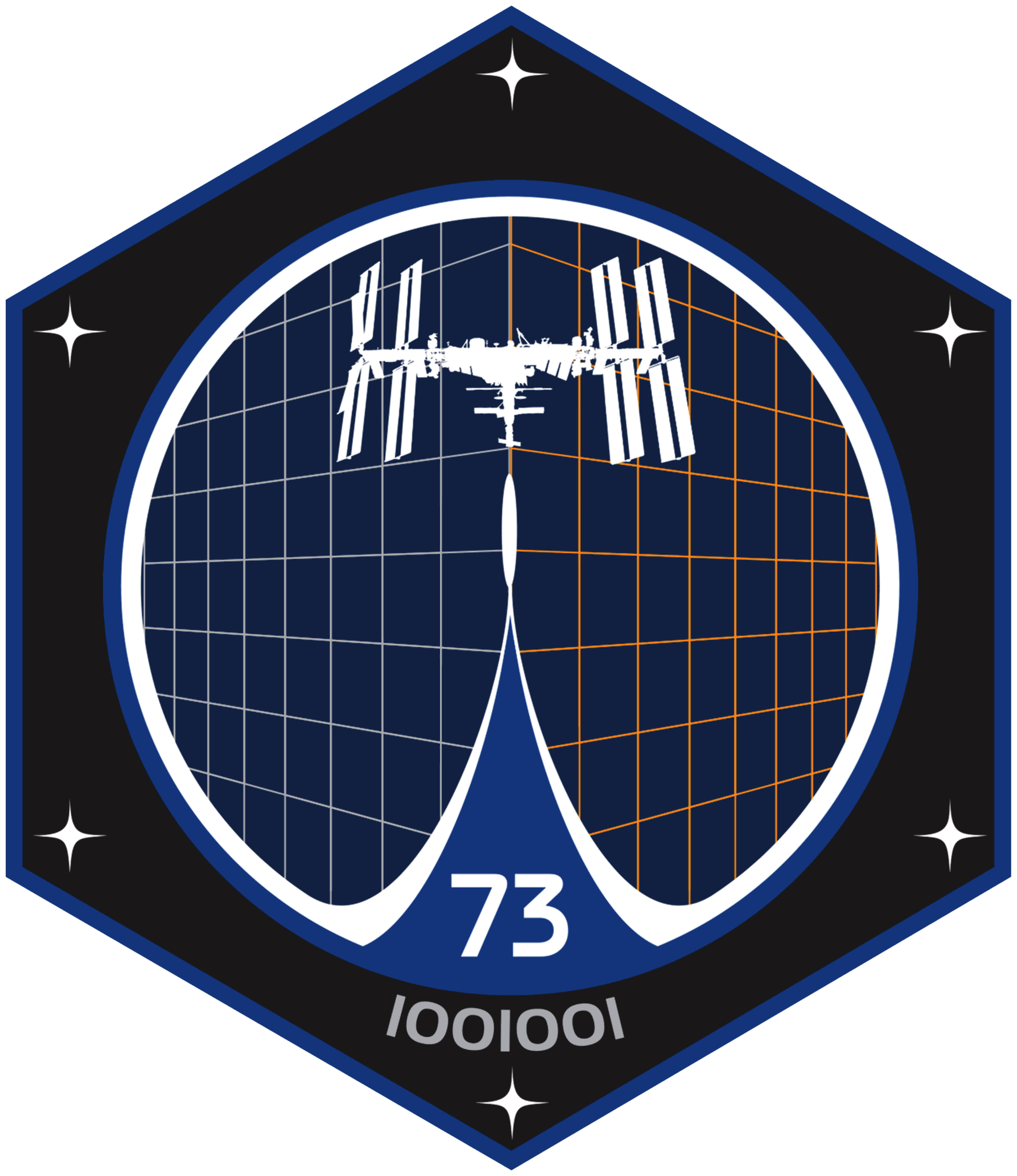
- Mission insignia

Sergei Nikolayevich Mikayev (Russian: Сергей Николаевич Мика́ев; born 15 August 1986) is a Russian cosmonaut affiliated with Roscosmos. He was selected as a reserve crew member for the Soyuz MS-27 mission to the International Space Station (ISS), which launched in April 2025.

== Career ==
Mikayev was selected as a cosmonaut candidate by Roscosmos and trained at the Yuri Gagarin Cosmonaut Training Center in Star City, Russia. In 2025, he was assigned to the reserve crew for Soyuz MS-27 as a backup flight engineer, supporting the primary crew of Sergey Ryzhikov, Alexey Zubritsky, and Jonny Kim. This mission, set to launch from the Baikonur Cosmodrome in Kazakhstan in April 2025, aims to facilitate long-term operations aboard the ISS. His role ensures readiness to step in if a primary crew member is unable to fly.

=== Expedition 73/74 ===
Mikayev conducted his first spaceflight and first ISS expedition aboard Soyuz MS-28. The mission launched on 27 November 2025 from Baikonur, Site 31/6. He continued into Expedition 73/74 and returned to Earth by summer of 2026.
