= Progress MS-32 =

2025 Russian resupply spaceflight to the ISS

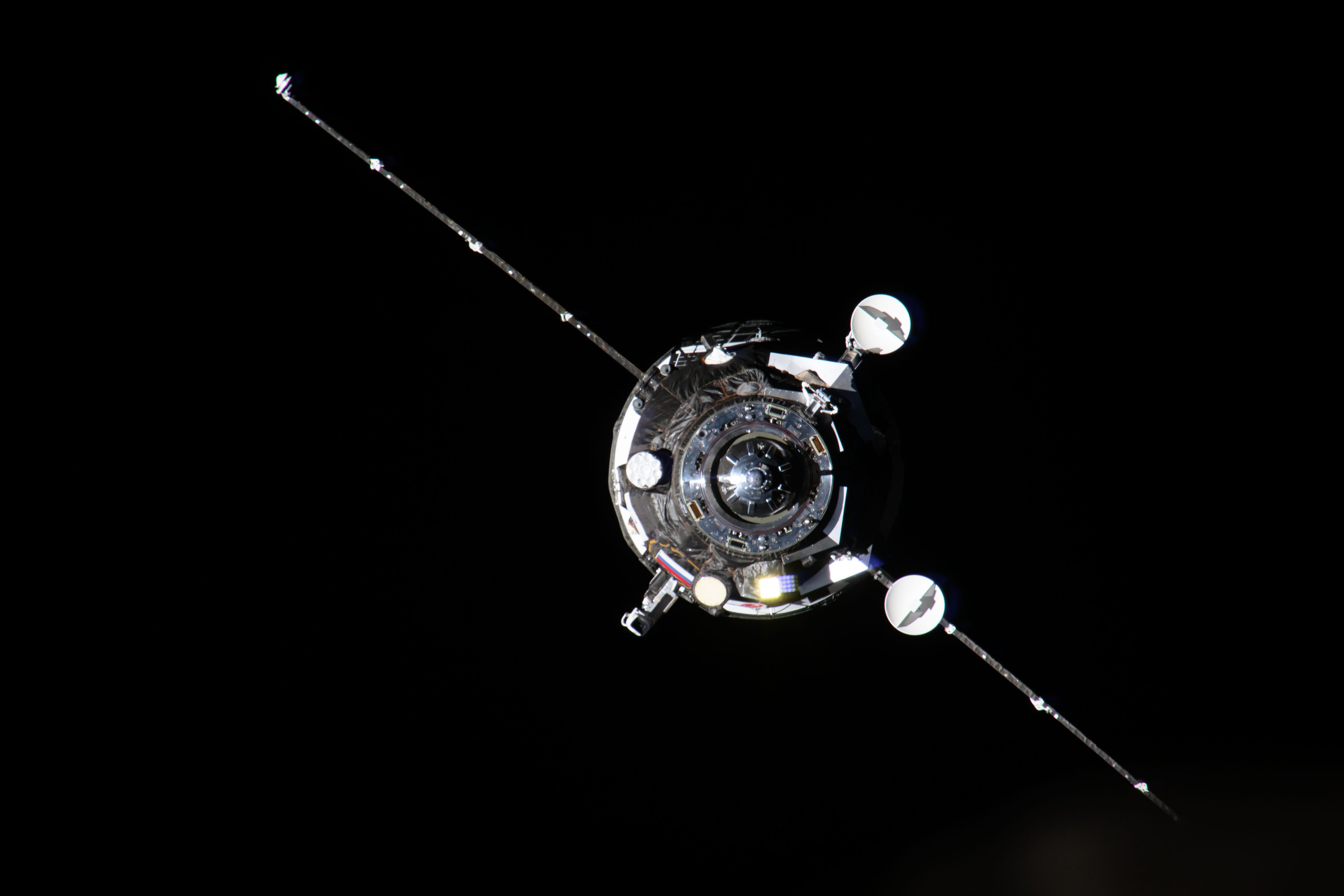
- Progress MS-32 on its final approach to dock to the ISS
- Names: Progress 93; ISS 93P
- Mission type: ISS resupply
- Operator: Roscosmos
- COSPAR ID: 2025-204A
- SATCAT no.: 65586
- Mission duration: 221 days, 10 hours and 10 minutes

Spacecraft properties
- Spacecraft: Progress MS-32 No. 462
- Spacecraft type: Progress MS
- Manufacturer: Energia
- Launch mass: 7,280 kg (16,050 lb)

Start of mission
- Launch date: 11 September 2025, 15:54:06 UTC (20:54:06 AQTT)
- Rocket: Soyuz-2.1a
- Launch site: Baikonur, Site 31/6
- Contractor: RKTs Progress

End of mission
- Disposal: Deorbited
- Decay date: 21 April 2026, 02:05 UTC

Orbital parameters
- Reference system: Geocentric orbit
- Regime: Low Earth orbit
- Inclination: 51.65°

Docking with ISS
- Docking port: Zvezda aft
- Docking date: 13 September 2025, 20:23 UTC
- Undocking date: 20 April 2026, 22:08:30 UTC
- Time docked: 219 days, 1 hour and 45 minutes

Cargo
- Mass: 2,516 kg (5,547 lb)
- Pressurised: 1,176 kg (2,593 lb)
- Fuel: 870 kg (1,920 lb)
- Gaseous: 50 kg (110 lb)
- Water: 420 kg (930 lb)

Progress MS-32 (Russian: Прогресс МC-32), Russian production No. 462, identified by NASA as Progress 93, was a Progress cargo spacecraft launched by Roscosmos to resupply the International Space Station (ISS). It is the 185th flight of a Progress spacecraft and the 300th launch of an assembly, crew, or cargo mission to the ISS.

== Mission ==
Progress MS-32 was launched on 11 September 2025 at 15:54 UTC. Following a two-day free flight, it docked to the aft port of the ISS's Zvezda service module at 20:23 UTC on 13 September 2025.

== Manifest ==
Each Progress mission delivers pressurized and unpressurized cargo to the station. The pressurized section carries consumables such as food, along with equipment for maintenance and scientific research. The unpressurized section contains tanks of fuel, drinking water, and gases to replenish the onboard atmosphere, which are transferred to the station through automated systems.

Progress MS-32 delivered new Orlan-MKS spacesuits for use during Russian spacewalks, which allow extravehicular activities of up to eight hours.

For this mission, Progress MS-32 carried a total of 2,516 kg (5,547 lb) of cargo and supplies, including:

- Pressurized supplies: 1,176 kg (2,593 lb), including:
  - 364 kg (802 lb) of food
  - 206 kg (454 lb) of equipment for scientific experiments
  - 86 kg (190 lb) of hygiene supplies
  - 19 kg (42 lb) of medical equipment
- Fuel: 870 kg (1,920 lb)
- Water: 420 kg (930 lb)
- Nitrogen gas: 50 kg (110 lb)

== See also ==
- Uncrewed spaceflights to the International Space Station
- List of Progress missions
