= Sophie Adenot =

French engineer, helicopter pilot and astronaut (born 1982)

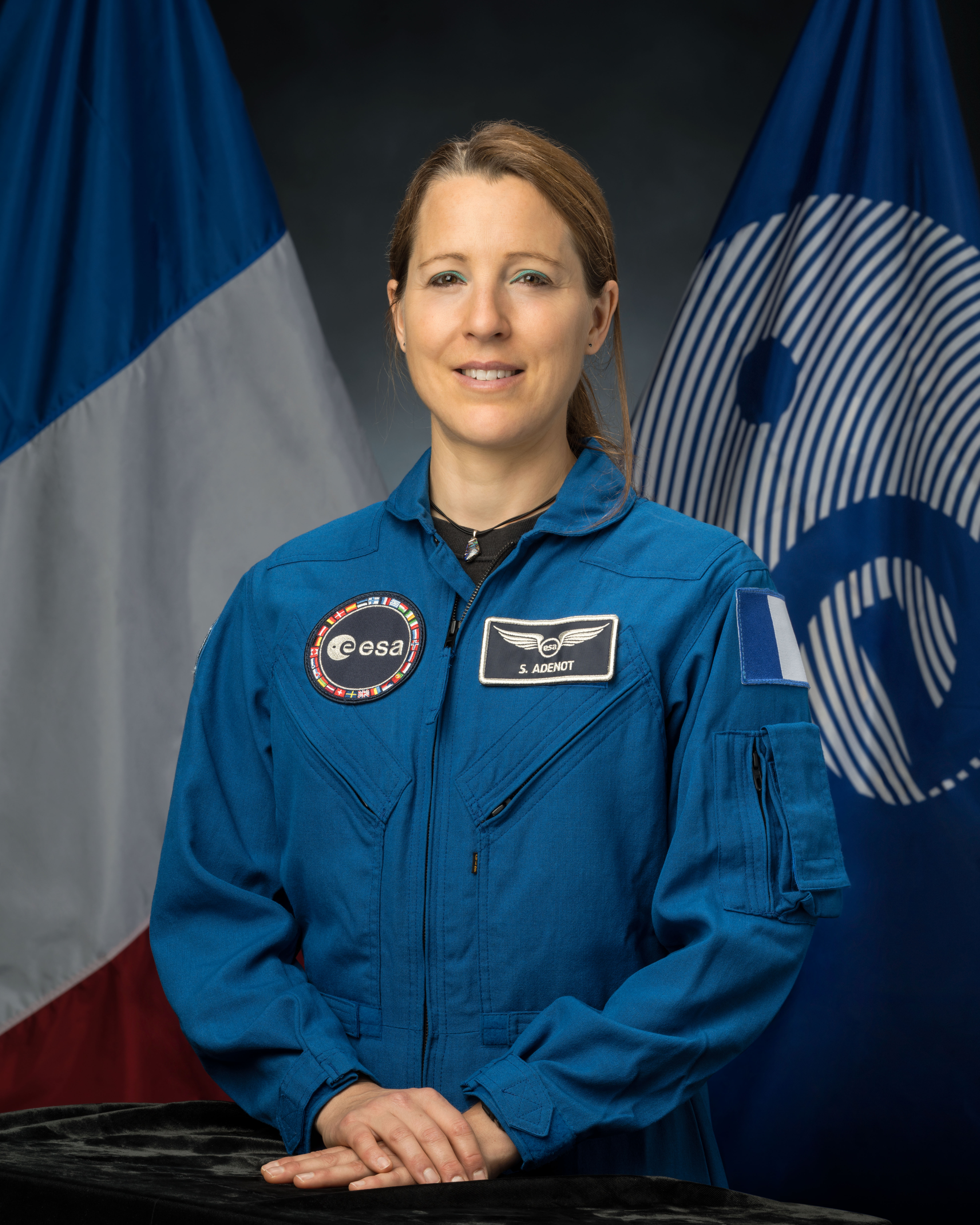
- Adenot in 2025
- Born: Sophie Marie Laurence Adenot; 5 July 1982 (age 44); Cosne-Cours-sur-Loire, France
- Education: Institut Supérieur de l'Aéronautique et de l'Espace; Massachusetts Institute of Technology
- Space career

ESA astronaut
- Time in space: 237 days, 5 hours, and 18 minutes
- Selection: 2022 ESA Group
- Total EVAs: 3
- Total EVA time: 19 hours, 42 minutes
- Mission: SpaceX Crew-12 (Expedition 74/75)
- Military career
- Branch: French Air and Space Force
- Years: 2005–present
- Rank: Colonel
- Units: Escadron d'Hélicoptères 1/67 Pyrénées (2008–2012); High Authority Transport Squadron (2012–2017); Direction générale de l'armement (2019–2022)
- Awards: National Order of the Legion of Honour (chevalier)

Sophie Marie Laurence Adenot (French pronunciation: [sɔfi ad(ə)no]; born 5 July 1982) is a French engineer, helicopter pilot, and astronaut. She holds the rank of colonel in the French Air and Space Force and became France's first female helicopter test pilot in 2018. She was selected to join the European Astronaut Corps as part of the 2022 group. Her first spaceflight began in February 2026 on SpaceX Crew-12, during which she launched to the International Space Station for a long-duration mission as a part of Expedition 74/75, where she became the first French woman to conduct a spacewalk.

== Early life and education ==
Sophie Marie Laurence Adenot was born on 5 July 1982, in Cosne-Cours-sur-Loire, Burgundy, France, to pharmacist Isabelle Adenot (née Alloy) and Hubert Adenot, a notary in Corbigny. Her mother served as national president of the French pharmaceutical order from 2009 to 2017. Childhood inspirations include her grandfather, who served in the French Air Force as an aircraft mechanic, and the astronaut Claudie Haigneré, who became the first French woman astronaut. She recalled being inspired by watching Haigneré's 1996 launch to the space station Mir live on television.

Adenot attended a maison d'éducation de la Légion d'honneur in Saint-Denis, a secondary school open to girls whose father, grandfather or great-grandfather had been awarded the Legion of Honour, where she obtained her baccalauréat. She then completed classes préparatoires aux grandes écoles to prepare for entry into a grande école.

From 2001 to 2003, she studied engineering at the Institut Supérieur de l'Aéronautique et de l'Espace (ISAE-SUPAERO), specializing in the flight dynamics of aircraft and spacecraft and earned a degree in 2004. That same year, she earned a Master of Science in human factors engineering from the Massachusetts Institute of Technology (MIT). While at MIT, she worked in the Man-Vehicle Laboratory and wrote her thesis on how the vestibular system adapts to artificial gravity, contributing to the development of centrifuge training for astronauts.

== Career ==
=== French Air Force ===
Promotional video produced by the Ministry for Europe and Foreign Affairs (in French)

After graduating, Adenot spent one year working as an engineer at Airbus Helicopters in Marignane, focusing on the design of helicopter cockpits, particularly for the company's H225 model.

Adenot joined the French Air Force in 2005. After completing helicopter pilot training, she was assigned to Escadron d'Hélicoptères 1/67 Pyrénées at Cazaux Air Base, where she piloted Caracal helicopters on search and rescue missions in hostile environments from 2008 to 2012. In 2008, she applied to the European Space Agency astronaut programme, the European Astronaut Corps, but was rejected. She transferred to the High Authority Transport Squadron based in Villacoublay, which is responsible for transporting the head of state, government ministers, and visiting foreign delegations, in 2012.

In 2017, she entered the école du personnel navigant d'essais et de réception, a test pilot school, and in 2018 became the first female helicopter test pilot in France. After graduating from Empire Test Pilots' School in the United Kingdom in 2018, she worked as a helicopter test pilot at Cazaux Air Base under the French Defence Procurement Agency from 2019 to 2022. As of 2022, she had accumulated over 3,000 flight hours across 22 different types of helicopters.

Adenot was promoted to the rank of lieutenant in August 2006, captain in 2009, commandant in December 2014, lieutenant colonel in June 2020, and colonel in July 2023.

=== European Space Agency ===
Adenot was selected to join the European Astronaut Corps as part of the 2022 European Space Agency Astronaut Group. She is the second French woman to join the corps, after Claudie Haigneré. The 2022 class, nicknamed "The Hoppers", was chosen from a pool of 22,500 applicants.

In 2024, ESA announced that Adenot would be the first member of her class to fly to the International Space Station (ISS) for a long-duration mission set for spring 2026. ESA's portion of the Crew-12 mission—Adenot's assignment—was dubbed "Epsilon". As part of SpaceX Crew-12, Adenot launched to the ISS on 13 February 2026 to join the Expedition 74/75 crew. She was set to participate in more than 200 experiments in microgravity during her 8-month stay on the ISS. These experiments included testing a device that allows for autonomous medical ultrasounds, named EchoFinder, to determine the impact of weightlessness on herself and other crew members; an experiment, called PhysioTool, to measure several of the body's physiological factors; and an experiment in partnership with French schools, named ChlorISS, to observe the impact of light and gravity on the growth of a Arabidopsis thaliana and a Brassica rapa (Mizuna) plant, both from the mustard family, and testing a prototype of a space suit, the "EuroSuit". She also brought a selection of French dishes, including lobster bisque and foie gras, created by Michelin-starred chef Anne-Sophie Pic to supplement standard onboard meals.

ESA astronaut Sophie Adenot is assisted by recovery teams after exiting the Dragon capsule, following nearly eight months in space on her first mission.

In August 2026, Adenot completed her first spacewalk. Alongside NASA astronaut Anil Menon, she removed a space-to-ground antenna on the station's Z1 truss segment in a spacewalk that lasted about six and a half hours. This made Adenot the first French woman, the second European woman after Samantha Cristoforetti in July 2022 to conduct a spacewalk, and the first to do so wearing an American Extravehicular Mobility Unit (EMU) rather than a Russian Orlan suit, which Cristoforetti wore for her spacewalk from the station's Poisk module. In the days before the excursion, Adenot and Menon organized tools inside the station's Quest Airlock, while commander Jessica Meir and flight engineer Jack Hathaway reviewed the Canadarm2 robotic-arm manoeuvres that supported the spacewalkers. Adenot also continued her onboard exercise research, running on the station's COLBERT treadmill while wearing the "EasyMotion-2" suit, which delivers electrical impulses to trigger muscle contractions during her workout. Adenot performed a second spacewalk on 25 August, also alongside Menon, and a third on 1 September alongside Meir.

== Awards and honours ==
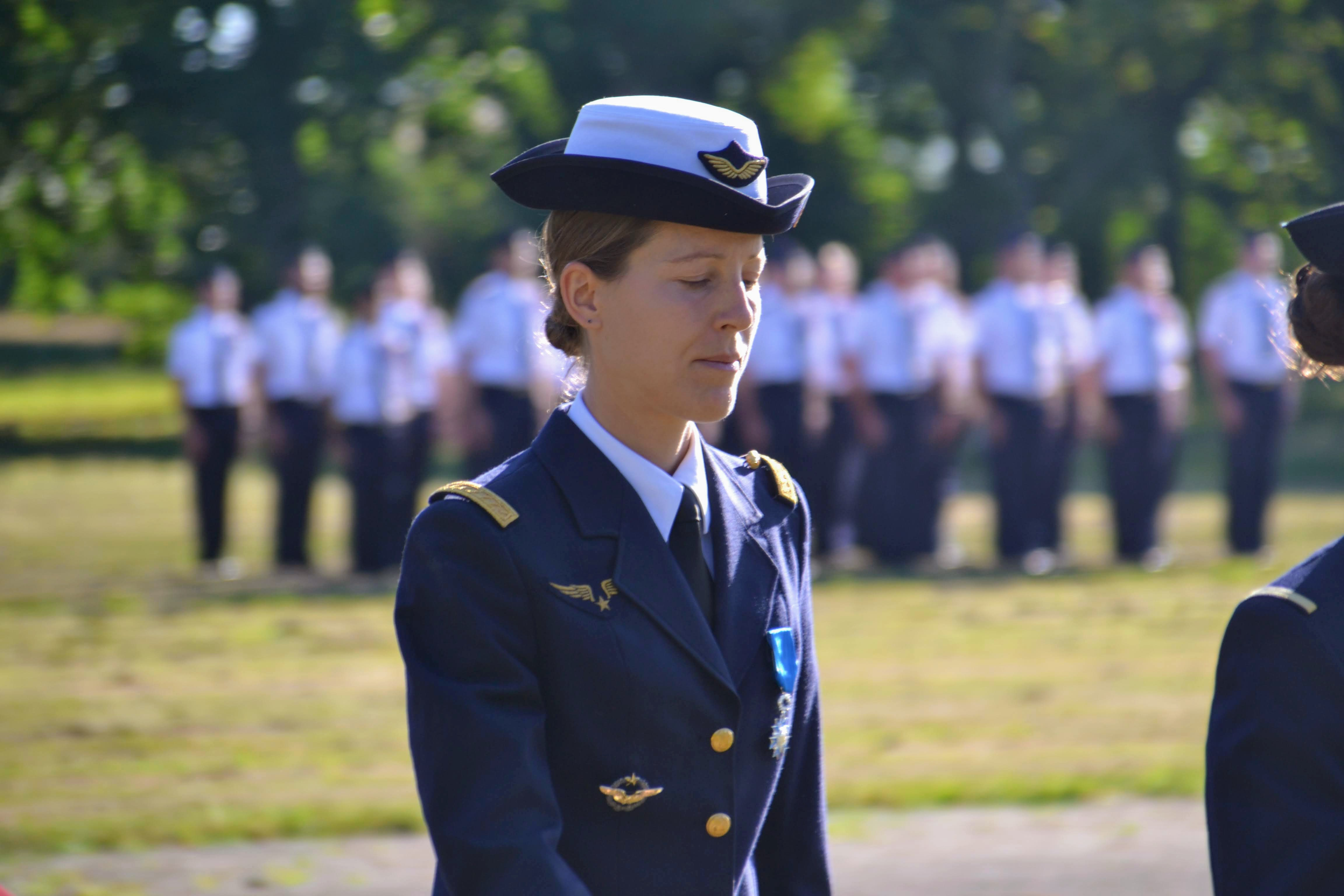
French National Order of Merit ceremony in 2022

In 2020, Adenot was recognized by the Young Leaders program of the French-American Foundation.

In 2021, she was awarded the Medal of the French National Assembly for her "actions as an inspiring ambassador for gender equality in sciences". She was appointed a chevalier of the French National Order of Merit in 2022. She is a recipient of the country's Aeronautical Medal.

She was appointed a chevalier of the National Order of the Legion of Honour on 14 July 2026.

== Personal life ==
Adenot met her husband during her engineering studies. As of 2025, they have one son.
