= Institute of Aviation Medicine =

Institute of Aviation Medicine may refer to:

- RAF Institute of Aviation Medicine (IAM), The Royal Air Force Institute of Aviation Medicine
- RAAF Institute of Aviation Medicine (AvMed), The Royal Australian Air Force Institute of Aviation Medicine
- RAF Centre of Aviation Medicine (CAM), the current incarnation of the IAM for British Armed Forces
- Flugmedizinisches Institut der Luftwaffe (FLMEDINSTLW) - Luftwaffe Institute of Aviation Medicine
