= High-g training =

Training done by aviators and astronauts

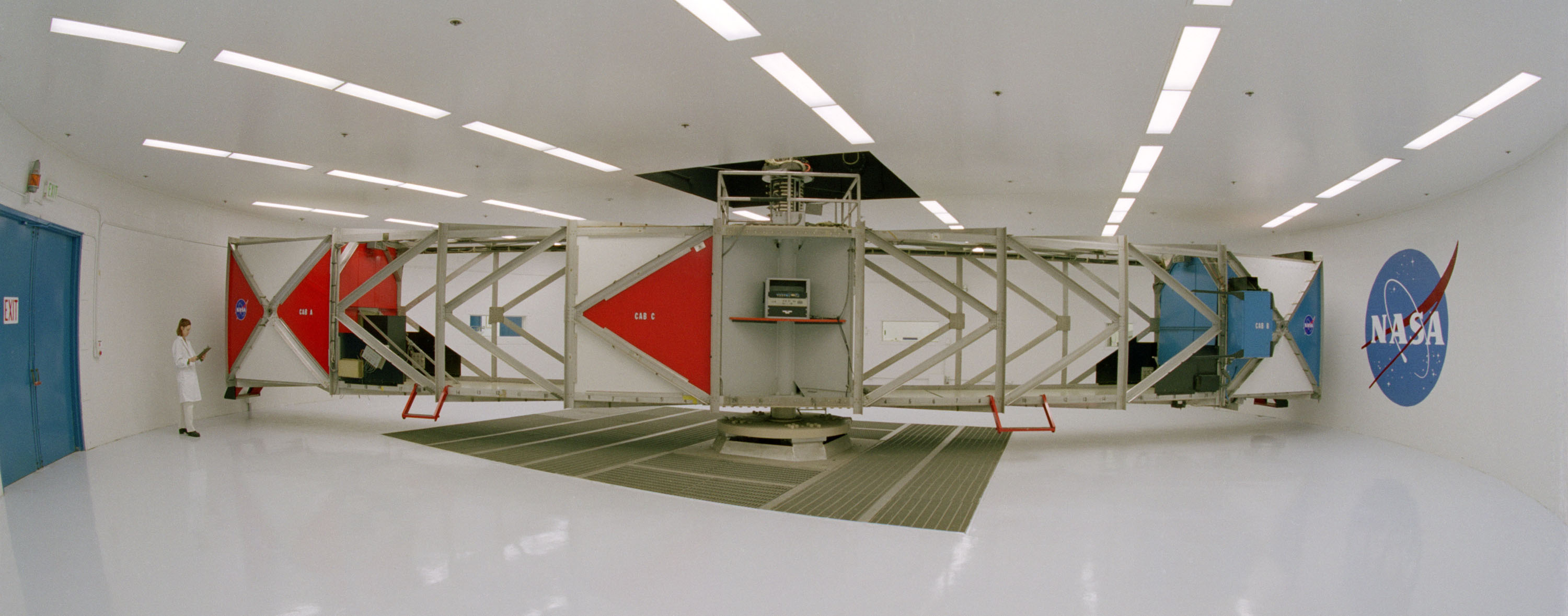
The 20 g centrifuge at the NASA Ames Research Center

High-g training is done by aviators and astronauts who are subject to high levels of acceleration ('g'). It is designed to prevent a g-induced loss of consciousness (g-LOC), a situation when the action of g-forces moves the blood away from the brain to the extent that consciousness is lost. Incidents of acceleration-induced loss of consciousness have caused fatal accidents in aircraft capable of sustaining high-g for considerable periods.

The value of training has been well established during the decades since the 1970s and has been the subject of much research and literature, and training has contributed to extending pilots' g tolerance in both magnitude and duration. Training includes centrifuge, Anti-g Straining Maneuvers (AGSM), and acceleration physiology.

== Overview ==
As g-forces increase, visual effects include loss of colour vision ("greyout"), followed by tunnel vision (where peripheral vision is lost, retaining only the centre vision). If g-forces increase further, complete loss of vision will occur, while consciousness remains. These effects are due to a reduction of blood flow to the eyes before blood flow to the brain is lost, because the extra pressure within the eye (intraocular pressure) counters the blood pressure. The reverse effect is experienced in advanced aerobatic maneuvers under negative g-forces, where excess blood moves towards the brain and eyes ("redout").

The human body has different tolerances for g-forces depending on the acceleration direction. Humans can withstand a positive acceleration forward at higher g-forces than they can withstand a positive acceleration upwards. This is because when the body accelerates up at such high rates the blood rushes from the brain which causes loss of vision.

A further increase in g-forces will cause g-LOC where consciousness is lost. This is doubly dangerous because, on recovery as g is reduced, a period of several seconds of disorientation occurs, during which the aircraft can dive into the ground. Dreams are reported to follow g-LOC which are brief and vivid.

The g thresholds at which these effects occur depend on the training, age and fitness of the individual. An untrained individual not used to the g-straining maneuver can black out between 4 and 6 g, particularly if this is pulled suddenly. Roller coasters typically do not expose the occupants to much more than about 3 g. A hard slap on the face may impose hundreds of g-s locally but may not produce any obvious damage; a constant 15 g-s for a minute, however, may be deadly. A trained, fit individual wearing a g suit and practicing the straining maneuver can, with some difficulty, sustain up to 9 g without loss of consciousness.

The human body is considerably more able to survive g-forces that are perpendicular to the spine. This is not true in 0 g when you strafe up; that is an eyeballs-down maneuver, which is the same force as a blackout where blood rushes to the feet, and this force is parallel to the spine. In general, when the g-force pushes the body forwards (colloquially known as 'eyeballs in') a much higher tolerance is shown than when g-force is pushing the body backwards ('eyeballs out') since blood vessels in the retina appear more sensitive to that direction.

== G-suits ==
A g-suit is worn by aviators and astronauts who are subject to high levels of acceleration and, hence, increasing positive g. It is designed to prevent a blackout and g-LOC, due to the blood pooling in the lower part of the body when under high-g, thus depriving the brain of blood.

== Human centrifuge training ==
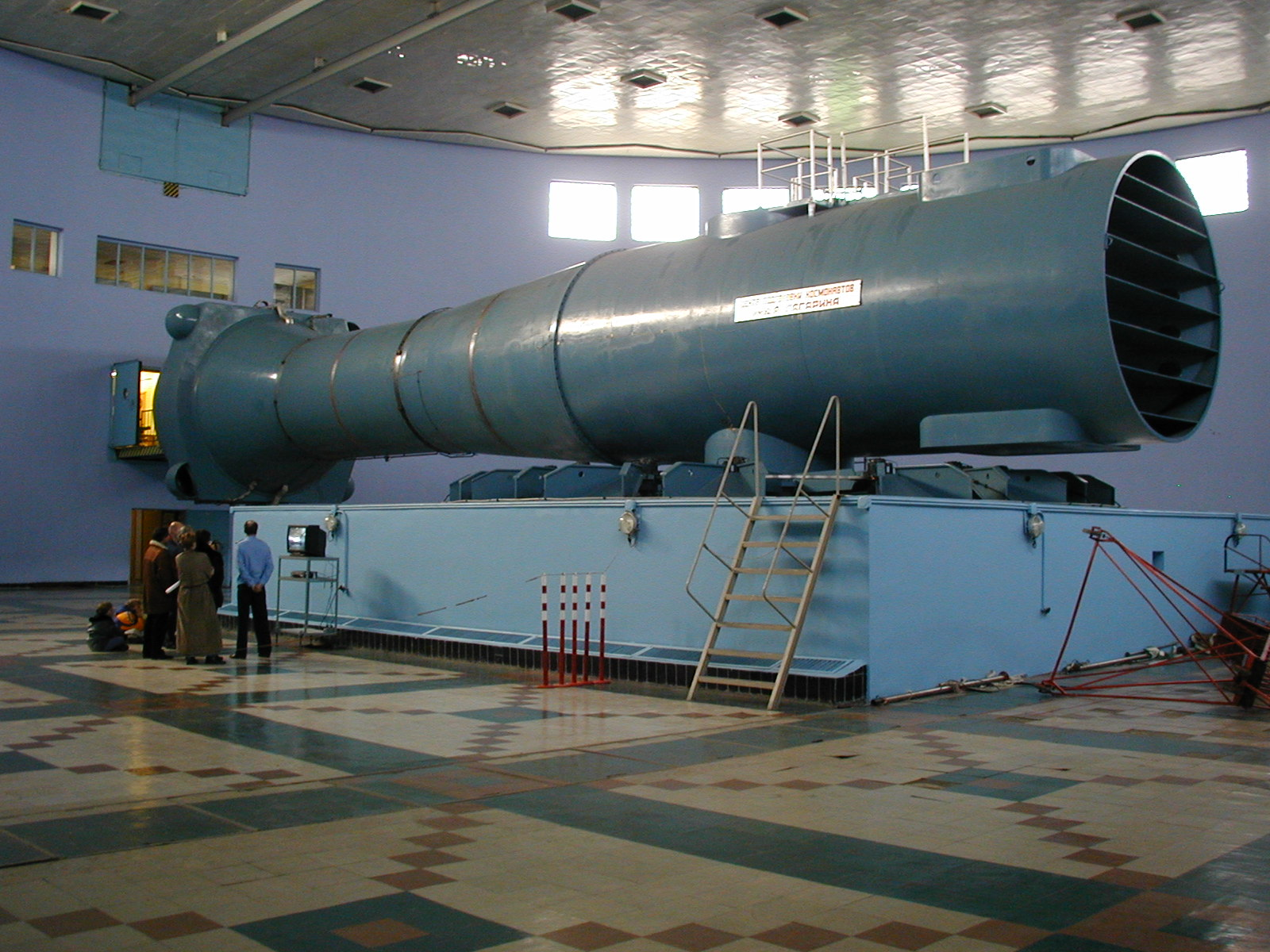
TsF-18 centrifuge at the Yuri Gagarin Cosmonauts Training Center

Human centrifuges are exceptionally large centrifuges that test the reactions and tolerance of pilots and astronauts to acceleration above those experienced in the Earth's gravity.

In the UK High-G training is provided at the High-G Training and Test Facility, RAF Cranwell using an AMST built human centrifuge. The facility trains Royal Navy, Royal Air Force and international students.

KBRwyle at Brooks City-Base in San Antonio, Texas, operates a human centrifuge. The centrifuge at Brooks is used to train USAF and USN aircrew for sustained high-g flight.

The use of large centrifuges to simulate a feeling of gravity has been proposed for future long-duration space missions. Exposure to this simulated gravity would prevent or reduce the bone decalcification and muscle atrophy that affect individuals exposed to long periods of free fall. An example of this can be seen aboard the Discovery spacecraft in the film 2001: A Space Odyssey.

Human-rated centrifuges are made by AMST Systemtechnik in Austria (Austria Metall SystemTechnik), Latécoère in France, Wyle Laboratories and ETC in the US.

== See also ==
- Bárány chair
- Aerotrim
- Flight training
- G-seat
- Index of aviation articles
