= Michael Trudgill =

Chief Medical Officer of The UK

Michael Trudgill FAsMA FRAeS
- Born: 6 January 1966 (age 60); Clophill, England
- Education: Bedford Modern School
- Alma mater: University of Wales, College of Medicine
- Occupation: Chief Medical Officer of the UK Civil Aviation Authority
- Height: 188 cm (6 ft 2 in)
- Spouse: Joy Trudgill (m. 1996)
- Children: 2

Michael Trudgill (born 1966) is the Chief Medical Officer (CMO) for the UK Civil Aviation Authority. Previously Trudgill was a British Senior Medical Officer and Officer Commanding for the Aircrew Equipment Integration Group at the RAF Centre of Aviation Medicine, a former serving Wing Commander in the Royal Air Force, a recipient of the Richard Fox-Linton Memorial Prize in 2005, the Astra Zeneca Prize for Occupational Medicine in 2006, the MOD Chief Scientific Adviser’s Commendation in 2010 and, in 2012, received international awards being made a Fellow of the Aerospace Medical Association and receiving the John Paul Stapp Award for his outstanding contribution to aviation medicine.

== Life ==
Michael John Ashley Trudgill was born in Ampthill in 1966. He was educated at Bedford Modern School and the University of Wales, College of Medicine where he graduated in medicine in 1989.

Trudgill became a member of the Royal College of General Practitioners in 1996 before completing further postgraduate diplomas in Immediate Medical Care and Occupational Medicine. He completed the diploma in Aviation Medicine in 1997 and began his career in aviation medicine at the newly formed RAF Centre of Aviation Medicine in 2000.

During his service career, Trudgill saw operational service in the first and second Gulf Wars as well as the Balkans. Trudgill left the Royal Air Force as a Wing Commander in 2004, but continued to work as a civilian senior medical officer at the RAF Centre of Aviation Medicine. Dr Trudgill served as Senior Medical Officer and Officer Commanding for the Aircrew Equipment Integration Group at the RAF Centre of Aviation Medicine where his work covers all aspects of aircrew safety and their protection equipment.

Dr. Trudgill was made a Fellow of the Royal Aeronautical Society in 2004, received the Richard Fox-Linton Memorial Prize in 2005, Astra Zeneca Prize For Occupational Medicine in 2006 and the MOD Chief Scientific Adviser’s Commendation in 2010. In 2012 he received international awards from the Aerospace Medical Association with the John Paul Stapp Award for his outstanding contribution to aviation medicine and was elected a Fellow in Aerospace Medicine.
