= RAF Centre of Aviation Medicine =

Organisation conducting aerospace medicine research in the UK

Coordinates: 52.0098°N 0.3021°W

RAF Centre of Aerospace Medicine
- Unit badge
- Active: 1 December 1998 – present
- Country: United Kingdom
- Branch: Royal Air Force
- Role: Defence medicine/scientific centre
- Part of: RAF Medical Services
- Home station: RAF Henlow
- Mottos: Ut secure volent (Latin for 'That they may fly free from care')

The RAF Centre of Aerospace Medicine (RAF CAM) is a medical organisation run by the Royal Air Force and based at RAF Henlow in Bedfordshire. It is the main organisation conducting aerospace medicine research in the UK.

== History ==
=== Formation ===
The centre was formed on 1 December 1998 as a result of the merger of the School of Aviation Medicine based at Farnborough in Hampshire and the Aviation Medicine Training Centre based at RAF North Luffenham in Rutland.

The centre's predecessor was the RAF Institute of Aviation Medicine (RAF IAM), which closed in 1994.

=== Expansion ===
The RAF Medical Board and RAF Institute of Health moved from RAF Halton in Buckinghamshire to the centre on 1 June 2000, becoming the Occupation and Environmental Medicine Wing.

It was formerly part of RAF Personnel and Training Command, becoming part of RAF Air Command in 2007.

In April 2022, the centre retired its two BAE Systems Hawk T1 which were based at MOD Boscombe Down in Wiltshire. The aircraft were used for trials by the centre's Aviation Medicine Flight. The flight moved to RAF Waddington to continue its work using Hawks operated by the Red Arrows.

=== Future ===
Due to anticipated closure of RAF Henlow, It is planned to relocate the centre to a new purpose-built facility at RAF Cranwell by 2026.

== Function ==
The RAF Centre of Aviation Medicine is the lead authority in the British Armed Forces for aviation medicine and provides:

- advice, support and services to the Ministry of Defence, British Army, Royal Navy and Royal Air Force, Military Aviation Authority, Air Accidents Investigation Branch, Defence Accident Investigation Branch, academia and commercial organisations
- support in the development of aircraft and other systems, including urgent operational requirements
- the RAF Medical Board and clinical assessment of military aircrew and air traffic controllers
- chemical, biological, radiological and nuclear (CBRN) training for aircrew
- aviation medicine training to the British armed forces and aircrew and medical personnel from other nations
- aviation medicine & aeromedical policy
- occupational health and environmental health support

=== Flying research ===
The centre researches the medical effects of flying, such as hypoxia and the effects of G-force. Flying fast-jet aircraft puts the cardiovascular physiology of the human body under extreme physical stress. Without intervention, exposure to high G force would cause a pilot to lose consciousness through lack of blood to the brain, otherwise known as G-induced loss of consciousness or G-LOC. Eurofighter Typhoon pilots regularly experience 9G. Other dangers include rapid uncontrolled decompression from failure of cabin pressurisation, and the centre has four hypobaric chambers.

Airlines that do not have their own aviation medicine research establishments (e.g. British Airways) have contracted out work to the RAF's Centre.

=== Academic support ===
King's College London School of Medicine and Dentistry at Guy's Hospital has run a MSc programme in aviation medicine, which involves the RAF's Centre, specifically the practical experience of G-forces, decompression, whole-body vibration, and vestibular (balance sensory system) and visual disorientation.

=== Training courses ===
The centre provides training for aircrew from the RAF and other organisations (via International Defence Training or Horizon Training) in subjects such as using night vision goggles and dealing with hypoxia.

It provides training for the on-board Critical Care Air Support Team (CCAST, similar to the Critical Care Air Transport Team of the USAF)

== Facilities ==
The RAF High G Training and Test Facility at RAF College Cranwell was opened on 4 February 2019 and is used to provide high-G training.

== See also ==
- Diving Diseases Research Centre, in Plymouth
- Luftwaffe Institute of Aviation Medicine
- USAF School of Aerospace Medicine (USAFSAM) at Wright-Patterson Air Force Base, Ohio
- Netherlands Aeromedical Institute at Soesterberg Air Base
- Aerospace Medical Association
