= Jessica Meir =

Swedish and American marine biologist and NASA astronaut

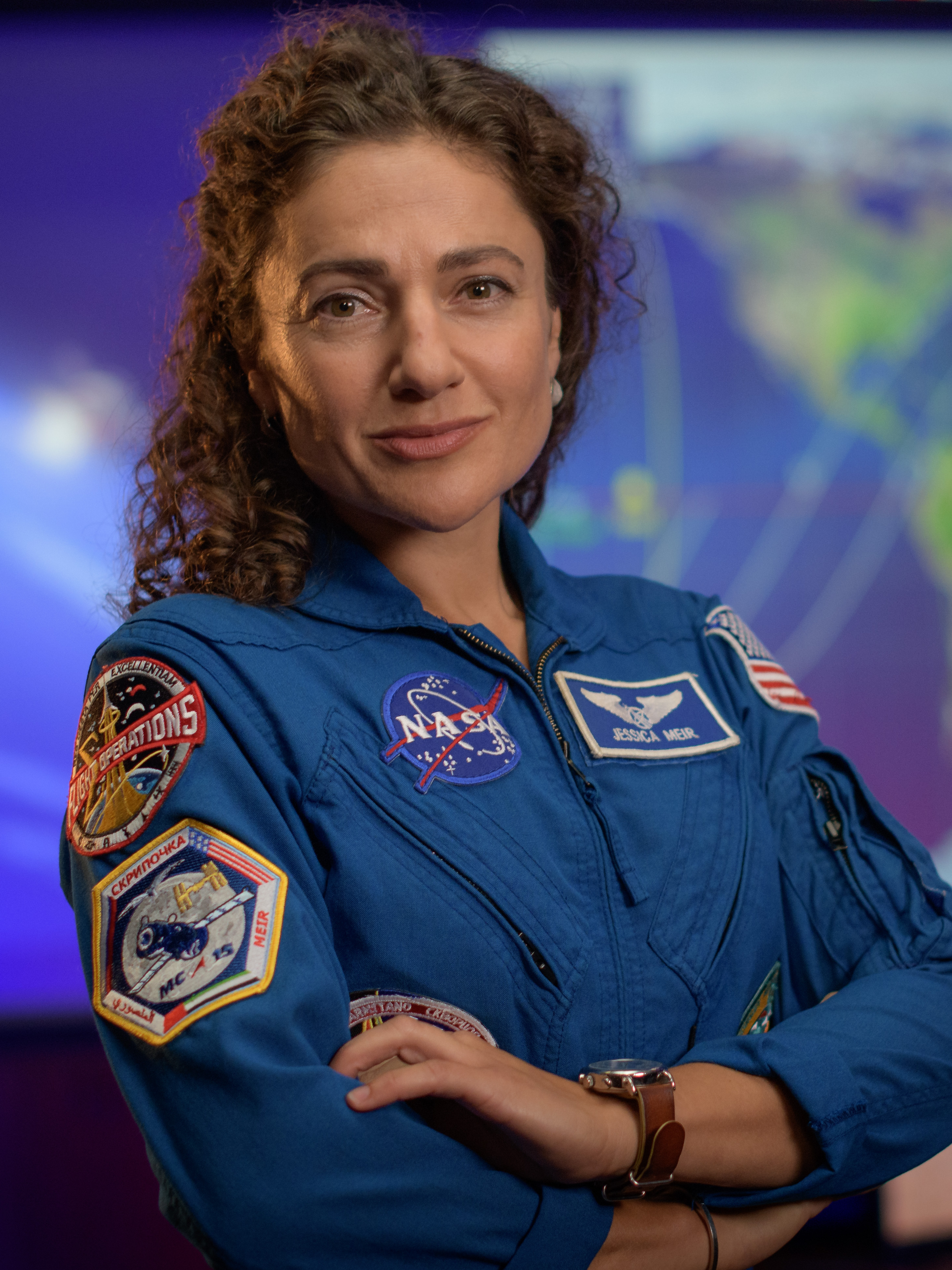
- Meir in 2020
- Born: Jessica Ulrika Meir; July 1, 1977 (age 49); Caribou, Maine, US
- Citizenship: United States; Sweden
- Education: Brown University (BS); International Space University (MS); University of California, San Diego (PhD)
- Space career

NASA astronaut
- Time in space: 441 days, 20 hours, and 36 minutes
- Selection: NASA Group 21 (2013)
- Total EVAs: 7
- Total EVA time: 49 hours, 22 minutes
- Mission: Soyuz MS-15 (Expedition 61/62); SpaceX Crew-12 (Expedition 74/75)
- Scientific career
- Fields: Marine biology; comparative physiology
- Workplaces: Harvard Medical School; NASA
- Thesis: Blood Oxygen Transport and Depletion: The Key of Consummate Divers (2009)
- Doctoral advisor: Paul Ponganis
- Other academic advisors: Bill Milsom (postdoc); Gerald Kooyman

Jessica Ulrika Meir (born July 1, 1977) is an American and Swedish marine biologist, physiologist, and NASA astronaut. She was previously an assistant professor of anesthesia at Harvard Medical School, Massachusetts General Hospital, Boston, following postdoctoral research in comparative physiology at the University of British Columbia. She has studied the diving physiology and behavior of emperor penguins in Antarctica, and the physiology of bar-headed geese, which are able to migrate over the Himalayas. In September 2002, Meir served as an aquanaut on the NASA Extreme Environment Mission Operations 4 (NEEMO 4) crew. In 2013, she was selected by NASA to Astronaut Group 21. In 2016, Meir participated in ESA CAVES, a training course in which international astronauts train in a space-analogue cave environment. Meir launched on September 25, 2019, to the ISS onboard Soyuz MS-15, where she served as a flight engineer during Expedition 61 and 62. On October 18, 2019, Meir and Christina Koch were the first women to participate in an all-female spacewalk. As a member of Expedition 74, during which she took command in July 2026 (Expedition 75), she made her fifth spacewalk, alongside Christopher Williams on his second, to repair the 58-foot-long (18 meters) Canadarm2 remote manipulator system.

Meir was included in Time magazine's 100 Most Influential People of 2020.

== Early life and career ==
Jessica Ulrika Meir was born on July 1, 1977, in Caribou, Maine, to Ulla Britt (née Karlsson), a Swedish nurse, and Josef Haim Meir, a Baghdadi Jewish Israeli physician. Her father was born in Baghdad, Mandatory Iraq in 1925 and moved to Mandatory Palestine in 1931. Studying medicine at the American University of Beirut when the 1948 Arab–Israeli War broke out, he moved to Israel and drove an ambulance. After the war he completed his medical studies at the University of Geneva. While practicing medicine in Sweden he met Jessica's mother, a nurse from Västerås who had grown up as a Christian. The couple moved to the US so that Josef could take up a medical residency at Johns Hopkins Hospital. While there he was offered a job in Caribou where Jessica was born. Her mother did not convert to Judaism but Jessica identifies as culturally Jewish, attended synagogue while growing up, and had a bat mitzvah.

She was inspired to venture into space after watching the Space Shuttle missions on television, though knew no one who worked for NASA or for the space program. She attributes her abiding dream of personally participating in space exploration to the love of nature she learned from her mother, and from her father's predilection for wandering and adventure. "And it might have had something to do with the fact that the stars shone so brightly in rural Maine", where she grew up.

At the age of 13, Meir attended a youth space camp at Purdue University. During her undergraduate biology studies at Brown University, she also spent a semester studying at Stockholm University in Sweden during her undergraduate years, and ran a student experiment on a NASA reduced gravity aircraft "vomit comet" in her senior year. Meir graduated from Brown in 1999 with a Bachelor of Science degree in biology, magna cum laude. In 2000, she graduated with a Master of Space Studies from the International Space University in Strasbourg, France.

=== Comparative physiology research ===
Meir earned a Ph.D. in marine biology in 2009 from the Scripps Institution of Oceanography for research on the diving physiology of emperor penguins and northern elephant seals. Meir performed field work at Penguin Ranch on McMurdo Sound in Antarctica to study the diving abilities of the emperor penguin while scuba diving alongside them under the ice. She also studied elephant seals while they were diving in the Pacific Ocean off Northern California.

Meir did post-doctoral research at the University of British Columbia, raising bar-headed geese so their tolerance of high altitude and low oxygen levels during flight over the Himalayas could be studied in a controlled environment. For the 2012 academic year she continued her research as an assistant professor of anesthesia at the Harvard Medical School/Massachusetts General Hospital and then took a leave of absence to enter the astronaut corps.

== NASA career ==
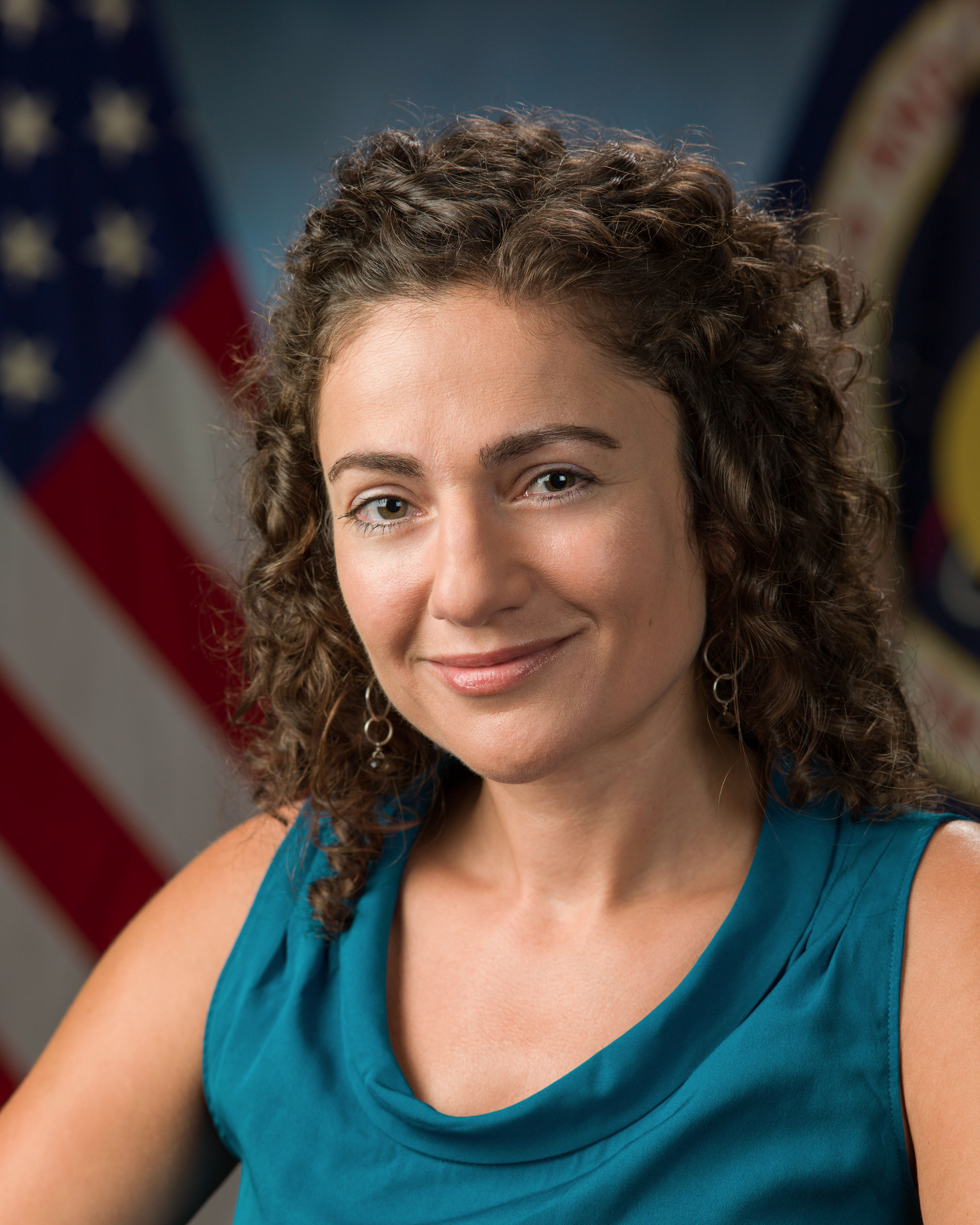
Meir in 2013

After getting her master's degree, Meir worked from 2000 to 2003 for Lockheed Martin Space Operations as an experiment support scientist for the Human Research Facility at the NASA Johnson Space Center (JSC) in Houston, Texas. Meir coordinated and supported human space life science experiments that were performed by astronauts on Space Shuttle and International Space Station (ISS) missions. These experiments included physiological studies (bone loss, muscle control/atrophy, lung function, etc.) to determine if any bodily processes were altered in the spaceflight environment. Meir guided these experiments through the necessary review cycles, developed procedures that the astronauts would use on-orbit, trained crew members, and provided ground support in the Mission Control Center while the astronauts were performing the experiments on the shuttle or ISS.

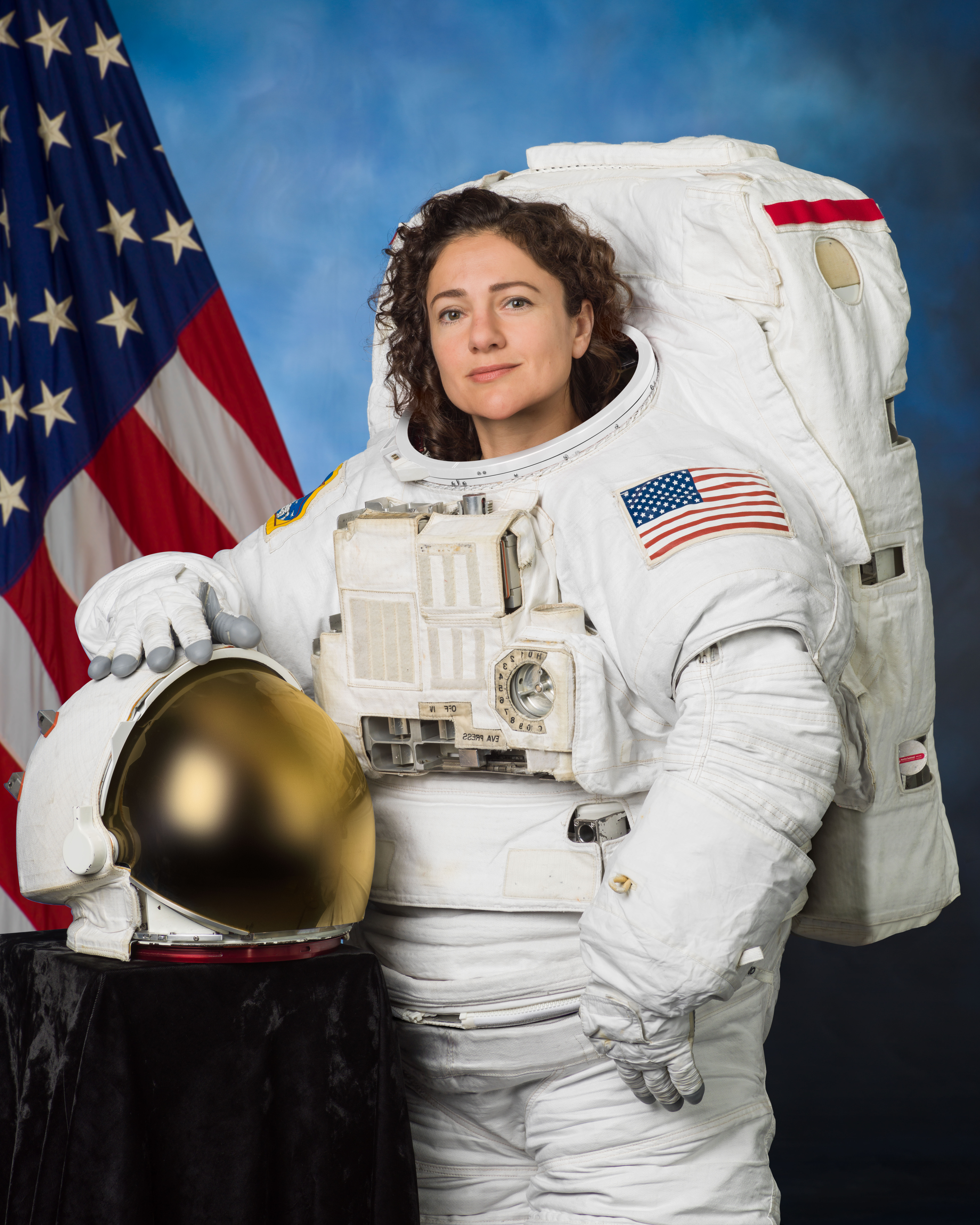
Meir in 2019

In September 2002, Meir served as an aquanaut on the joint NASA-NOAA NEEMO 4 expedition (NASA Extreme Environment Mission Operations), an exploration research mission held in Aquarius, an undersea research laboratory four miles off shore from Key Largo. Meir and her crewmates spent five days saturation diving from the Aquarius habitat as a space analogue for working and training under extreme environmental conditions. The mission was delayed due to Hurricane Isadore, forcing National Undersea Research Center managers to shorten it to an underwater duration of five days. Then, three days into their underwater mission, the crew members were told that Tropical Storm Lili was headed in their direction and to prepare for an early departure from Aquarius. Fortunately, Lili degenerated to the point where it was no longer a threat, so the crew was able to remain the full five days.

At the time of NEEMO 4, Meir was leaning toward pursuing a PhD in a field related to evolutionary biology and/or life in extreme environments (astrobiology). She was also fascinated by marine biology (which suited the NEEMO mission well), and hoped to coordinate a specific topic of study to combine these main interests. She received her PhD in marine biology from Scripps Institution of Oceanography, studying diving physiology, in 2009.

In 2009, Meir was a semi-finalist for selection to NASA Astronaut Group 20. For the next selection group in June 2013, Meir was chosen as one of eight astronaut candidates for training in NASA Astronaut Group 21. She completed training in July 2015.

In 2016, she participated in the ESA CAVES mission of the European Space Agency alongside Ricky Arnold, Sergei Korsakov, Aki Hoshide, Ye Guangfu and Pedro Duque.

During her time in the astronaut office, Meir has served as the capsule communicator for various missions. She was the lead capsule communicator for Expedition 47, the BEAM mission, and a HTV (Japanese Space Agency cargo vehicle) mission.

Meir is a member of the science advisory board of Adventurers and Scientists for Conservation.

=== Expedition 61/62 ===
In April 2019 NASA announced that Meir had been assigned to the crew of International Space Station Expedition 61/62 as flight engineer, scheduled to launch aboard Soyuz MS-15 alongside Roscosmos cosmonaut Oleg Skripochka and MBRSC astronaut Hazza Al Mansouri, who flew a short duration mission and landed with the crew of Soyuz MS-12 eight days after launch.

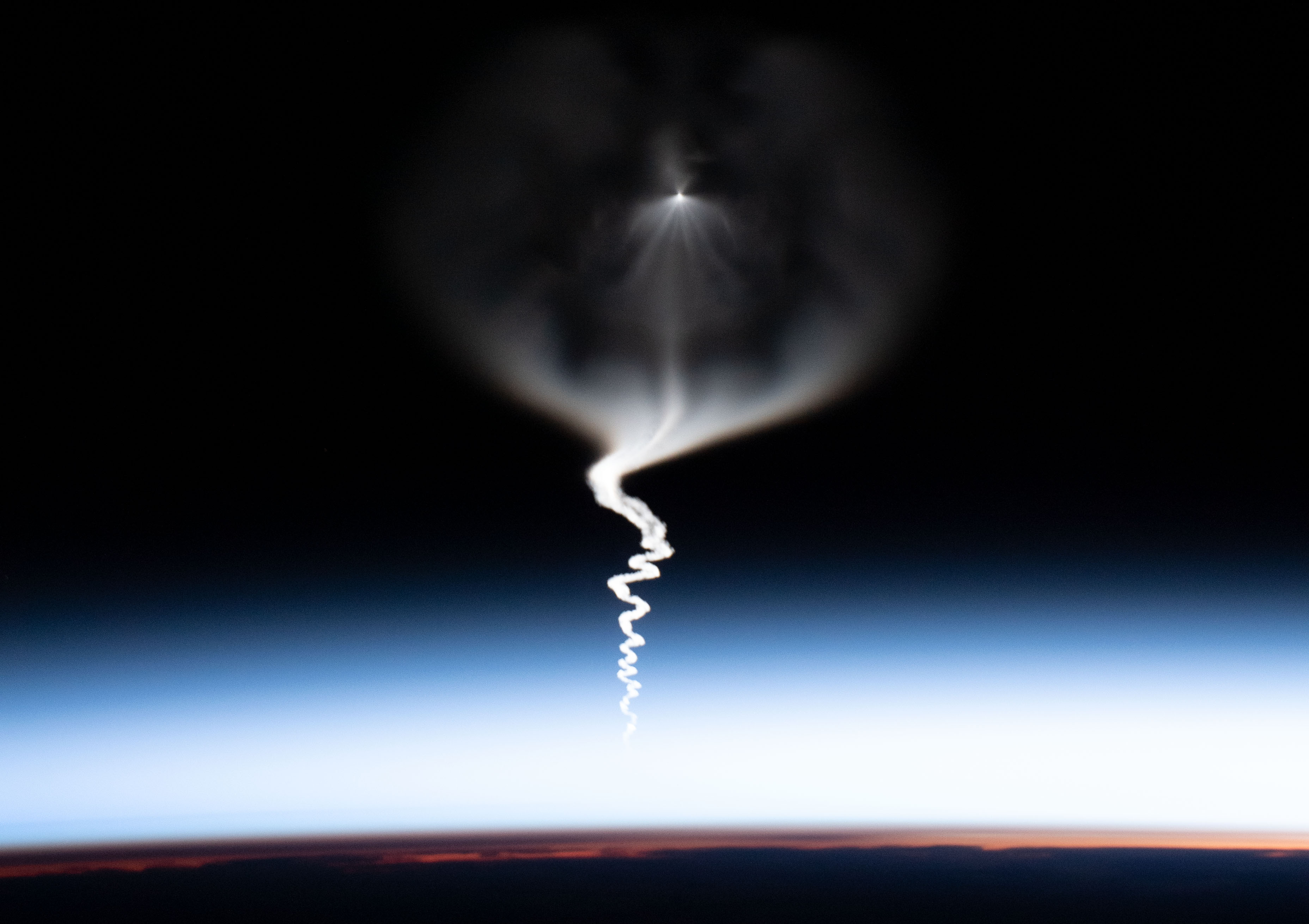
Soyuz MS-15 photographed from the ISS during launch

Meir, Skripochka, and Al Mansouri launched aboard MS-15 on September 25, 2019, marking the final flight of the Soyuz-FG rocket and final launch from the Gagarin's Start launch pad, both of which were retired following launch of Soyuz MS-15. The crew successfully reached orbit and rendezvoused with the ISS only six hours later. Soyuz MS-15 docked to the ISS at the very end of Expedition 60, meaning it marked an unusual period on the station where there were nine people aboard. The reason for this was to allow for Al Mansouri's flight, in which he became the first person from the United Arab Emirates to fly in space. Expedition 60 ended on October 3, 2019, when Al Mansouri, alongside Soyuz MS-12 crew members Aleksey Ovchinin and Nick Hague, undocked from the station and returned to Earth, returning the ISS to normal six-crew operations during Expedition 61.

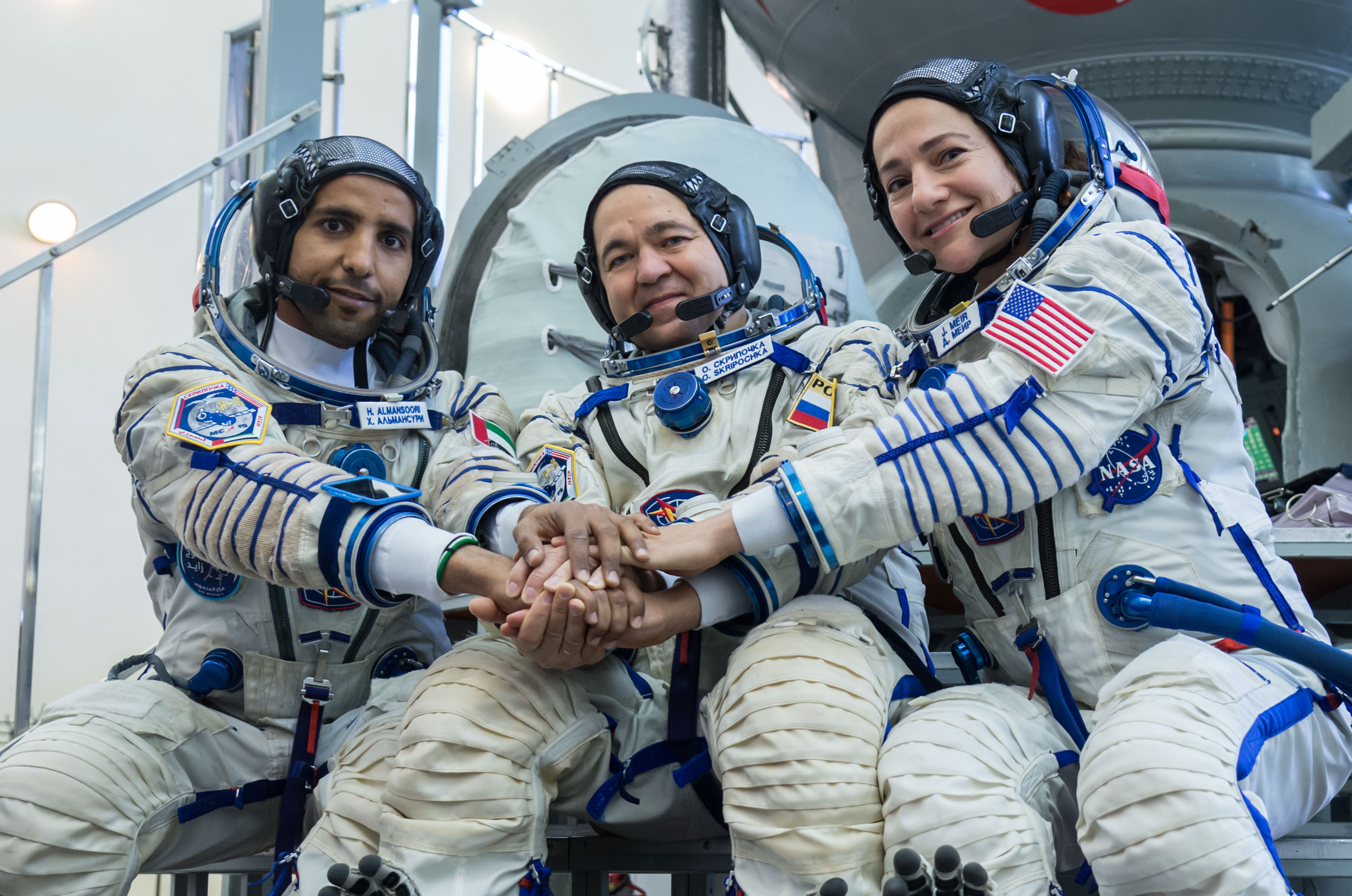
Meir (right) and her Soyuz MS-15 crewmates Hazza Al Mansouri (left) and Oleg Skripochka (center)

During Expedition 61, Meir was scheduled to perform three spacewalks during this mission to help install new lithium-ion batteries on the Port-6 truss structure of the ISS, although this schedule was later changed. On October 18, 2019, Meir performed her first spacewalk alongside her colleague Christina Koch, replacing a faulty Battery Charging Discharging Unit. The unit had unexpectedly failed to activate, preventing the station's newly installed lithium-ion batteries from providing additional power. The three other scheduled spacewalks scheduled to install the new batteries had to be postponed in order to perform this spacewalk. The spacewalk lasted seven hours and 17 minutes, and was the first all-female spacewalk in history. During the spacewalk, US president Donald Trump called and spoke to the astronauts in recognition of the historical significance of this event, being corrected by Meir after mistakenly announcing the event as the first time a woman was outside the space station.

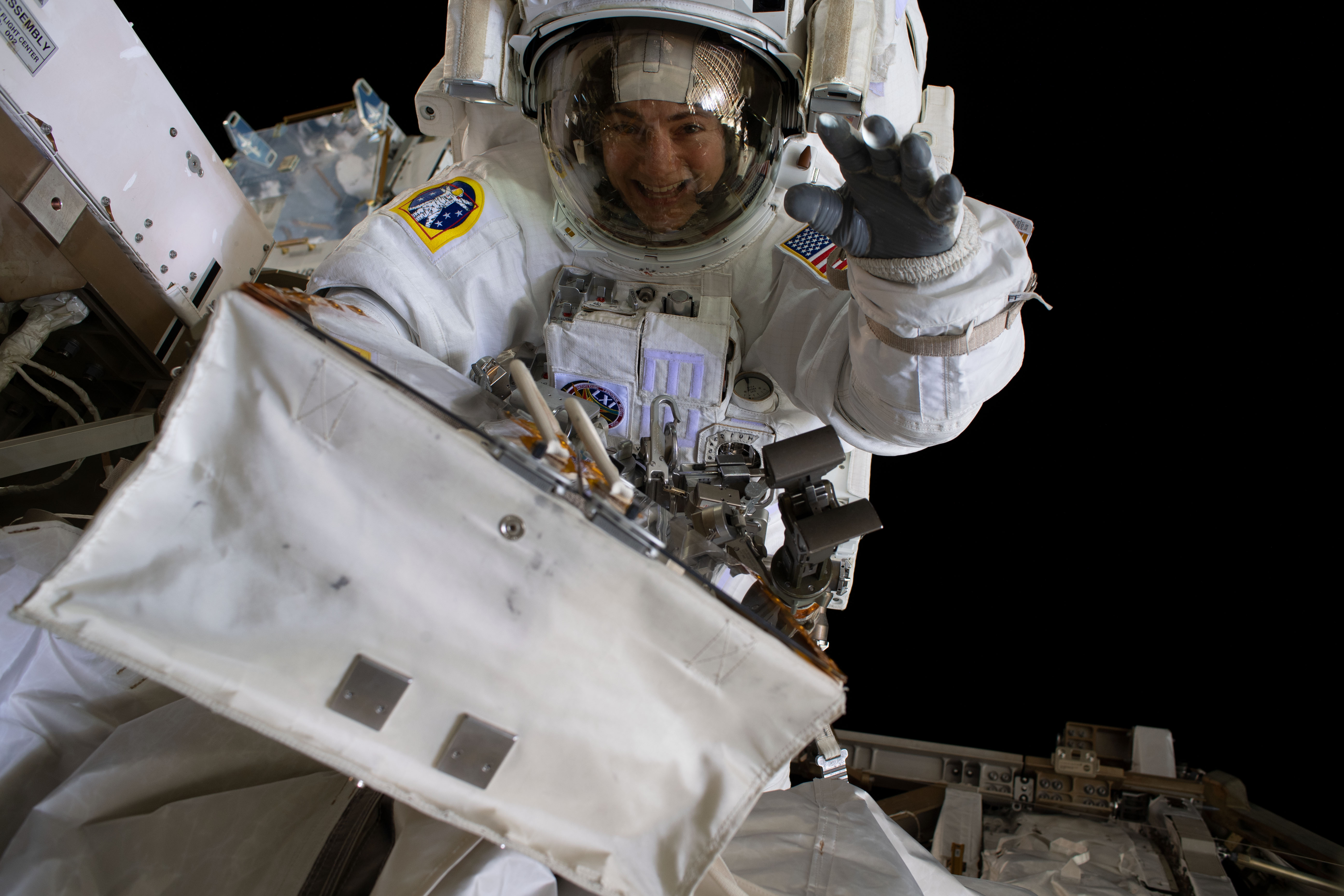
Meir during her EVA on October 18

On February 6, 2020, Koch, alongside Soyuz MS-13 crew members Aleksandr Skvortsov and Luca Parmitano, returned to Earth, following which Meir, Skripochka, and Andrew Morgan transferred over to Expedition 62. Due to delays with NASA's Commercial Crew Program, most of this increment was spent as a crew of three. During the final eight days of the expedition, the crew was joined by the three person crew of Soyuz MS-16, Russian cosmonauts Anatoli Ivanishin and Ivan Vagner joined by NASA astronaut Christopher Cassidy, who launched and docked to the station on April 9, 2020. Although their time as a six-person crew was short, the expanded Expedition 62 crew made the most of their time together, conducting experiments on how muscles react to long duration spaceflight as part of NASA's Muscle tone in space (Myotones) experiment. On April 13, Meir and Cassidy, both Maine natives, participated in a live conference with several students from around Maine; the two, joined by Andrew Morgan, also participated in a segment of Some Good News, an internet show hosted by American actor John Krasinski to spread good news during the COVID-19 pandemic.

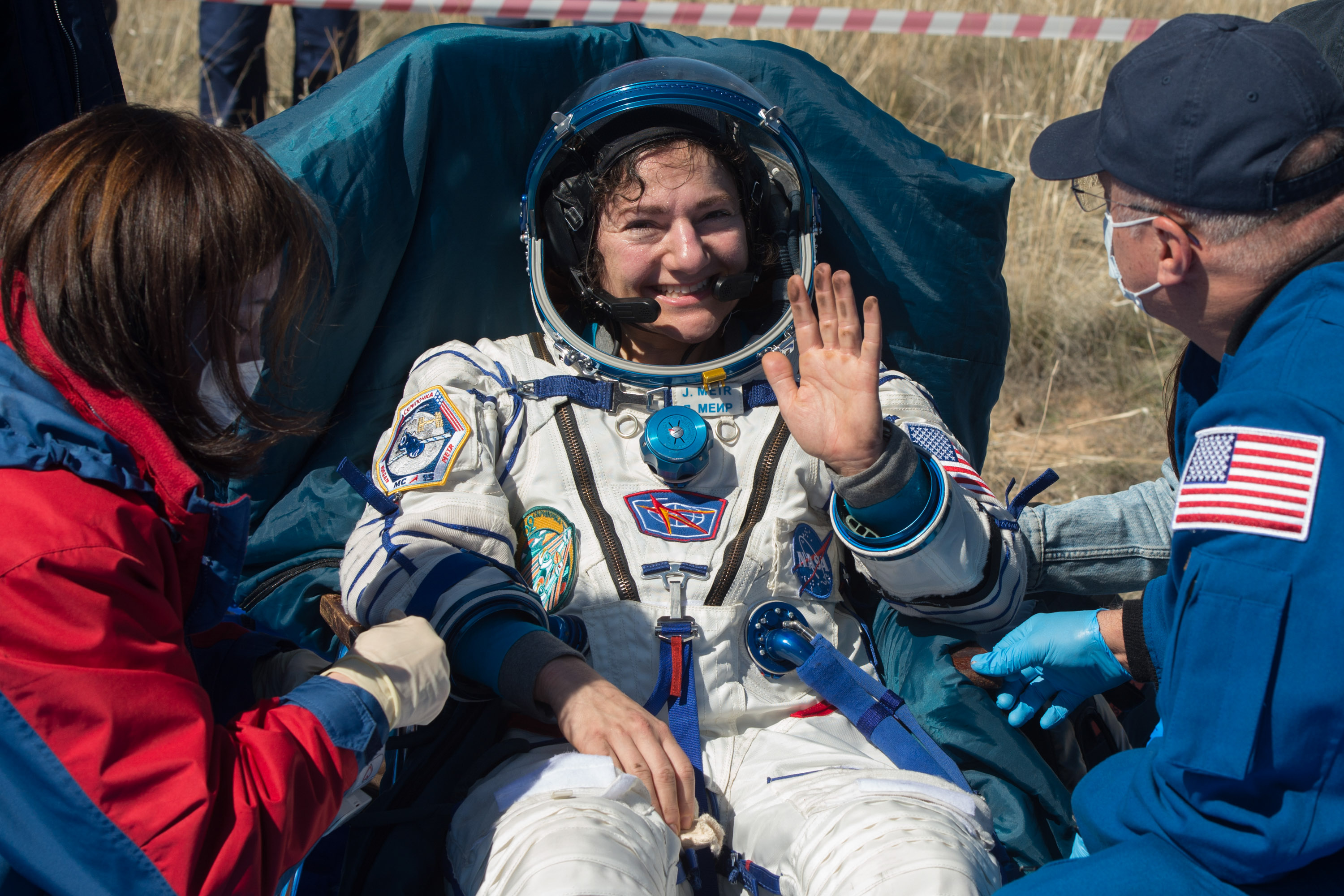
Meir following the return of Soyuz MS-15

On April 17, 2020, Meir, joined by Skripochka and Morgan, returned to Earth aboard Soyuz MS-15, wrapping up a 205-day spaceflight for Meir and Skripochka and returning Morgan from a 272-day flight. The Soyuz capsule touched down near the town of Dzhezkazgan, Kazakhstan, at 11:16am local time. The departure of the three crew members signaled the start of Expedition 63, commanded by Cassidy.

=== Expedition 74/75 ===
In December 2025, NASA announced that Meir had been assigned to the SpaceX Crew-12 as commander to serve on Expedition 74/75. Meir alongside Jack Hathaway, Sophie Adenot, and Andrey Fedyaev launched from Space Launch Complex 40 at Cape Canaveral on February 13, 2026 and arrived to the International Space Station by February 14.

== Personal life ==
Meir played woodwind instruments in her youth, and enjoys reading classical literature, recreational cycling, hiking, running, skiing, soccer and scuba diving, and holds a private pilot's license.

Apart from English and Russian (required for astronaut training), she also speaks Swedish. Due to holding Swedish citizenship by virtue of her mother's country of birth, she is the first Swedish woman in space and the second Swedish person in space after ESA astronaut Christer Fuglesang.

Astronauts are allowed to bring a number of personal items to the International Space Station, and two among Meir's choices were an Israeli flag and a pair of novelty socks with Stars of David and menorahs. Most of Meir's relatives from her father's side reside in Israel. Meir has visited Israel twice: the first time as a teenager with her parents and her brother, and the second time in 2016 for work as an astronaut where she gave a talk in Haifa, Israel, at the International Space University summer session. Among other things, she also took pictures of Israel from space.

On International Women's Day in 2023, Meir announced the recent birth of her first child, a girl, on her Instagram account. Her partner and co-parent is Duke Brady, an artist and biologist who grew up in Hawaii. He has appeared on two seasons of the Naked and Afraid series.

== Awards ==
Awards granted to Meir include:

- Philanthropic Educational Organization (PEO) Scholar Award (2008);
- Achievement Rewards for College Scientists (ARCS) Fellowship (2006);
- Lockheed Martin Space Operations (LMSO) Special Recognition Award (2002);
- NASA JSC Space and Life Sciences Directorate Special Professional Achievement Award (2002);
- Lockheed Martin Technology Services "Lightning Award" (2002);
- Honorary Doctor of Technology from Luleå University of Technology, Sweden (2020);
- Karman Project Fellowship (2021)
- Sir Charles Sherrington Prize Lecture & Medal (2021), University of Oxford;
- President's Lecture & Medal (2021), The Physiological Society of the United Kingdom & Republic of Ireland.
- H. M. The King's Medal of the 8th size gold with the Order of the Seraphim ribbon (2023)

Preceded by Sergey Kud-Sverchkov	ISS Commander (Expedition 75); July 25, 2026, to October 4, 2026	Succeeded by Pyotr Dubrov
