= Spartan Space =

French lunar surface habitat company

Spartan Space is a French space company specializing in the development of habitation systems for extreme environments. Based in Septèmes-les-Vallons, France. It is among the inaugural laureates of the TECHTHEMOON initiative by CNES. The company is known for developing the EUROHAB concept, a lunar remote base camp designed as a payload for a robotic lunar lander, and the development of a IVA space suit.

== History ==
Spartan Space was founded in January 2021 by Peter Weiss, a Franco-German engineer. The capital was increased in June 2021 by introducing several shareholders into the company, such as the architect Jacques Rougerie and the astronauts Jean-Francois Clervoy and Jean Jacques Favier. In September 2021, a full-scale model of the EUROHAB concept was unveiled at the International Astronautical Congress (IAC) in Dubai. The company has won several development projects with the European Space Agency and the French National Centre for Space Studies (CNES), and is involved in the development of the Lunar I-HAB, the European habitation module developed by Thales Alenia Space in Turin. In 2023, the French National Assembly exhibited a second mock-up of Eurohab at the Palais Bourbon in Paris.

== Eurohab ==
Eurohab is a concept for a lunar surface habitat developed by Spartan Space. The idea was initially developed by Peter Weiss and Jean Jacques Favier and received a prize from the Foundation Jacques Rougerie. Eurohab is based on an inflatable habitat that can be transported to the lunar surface by a robotic vehicle such as the ESA Argonaut Lander or the Nyx Lander of The Exploration Company. Automatically deployed at the lunar south pole, it serves as a remote base camp for a crew of astronauts in extravehicular activity.

Spartan Space developed a first mock-up of the habitat, which was exhibited at IAC 2021 and the French Pavilion of the Expo 2020 in Dubai. In 2022, the company performed tests with the system in the desert of Abu Dhabi. Air Liquide and the French CEA joined the concept to provide an energy management system based on flexible solar cells, regenerative fuel cells and a management system based on artificial intelligence. The same year the concept was presented to the French senate as potential French contribution to the Artemis Program during a public audition.

== Airlock ==
Spartan and Airbus Defence and Space have completed a design for a lunar habitat airlock, commissioned by CNES.

== EuroSuit ==
In 2023, CNES selected Spartan Space as the prime contractor to develop a European intra-vehicular activity (IVA) spacesuit. Other contributors to the projects are the Institute of Space Medicine and Physiology (MEDES) and the French company Decathlon. The first images of the spacesuit, named EuroSuit, were published in November 2025. A developmental version of EuroSuit was tested in 2026 on the ISS during the mission Epsilon of the ESA astronaut Sophie Adenot. Simultaneously, Spartan Space performed a EuroSuit water survival test campaign in Marseille. The company is expected to develop a final ground version of the suit by the end of 2027.
