= SpaceX Crew-12 =

2026 American crewed spaceflight to the ISS

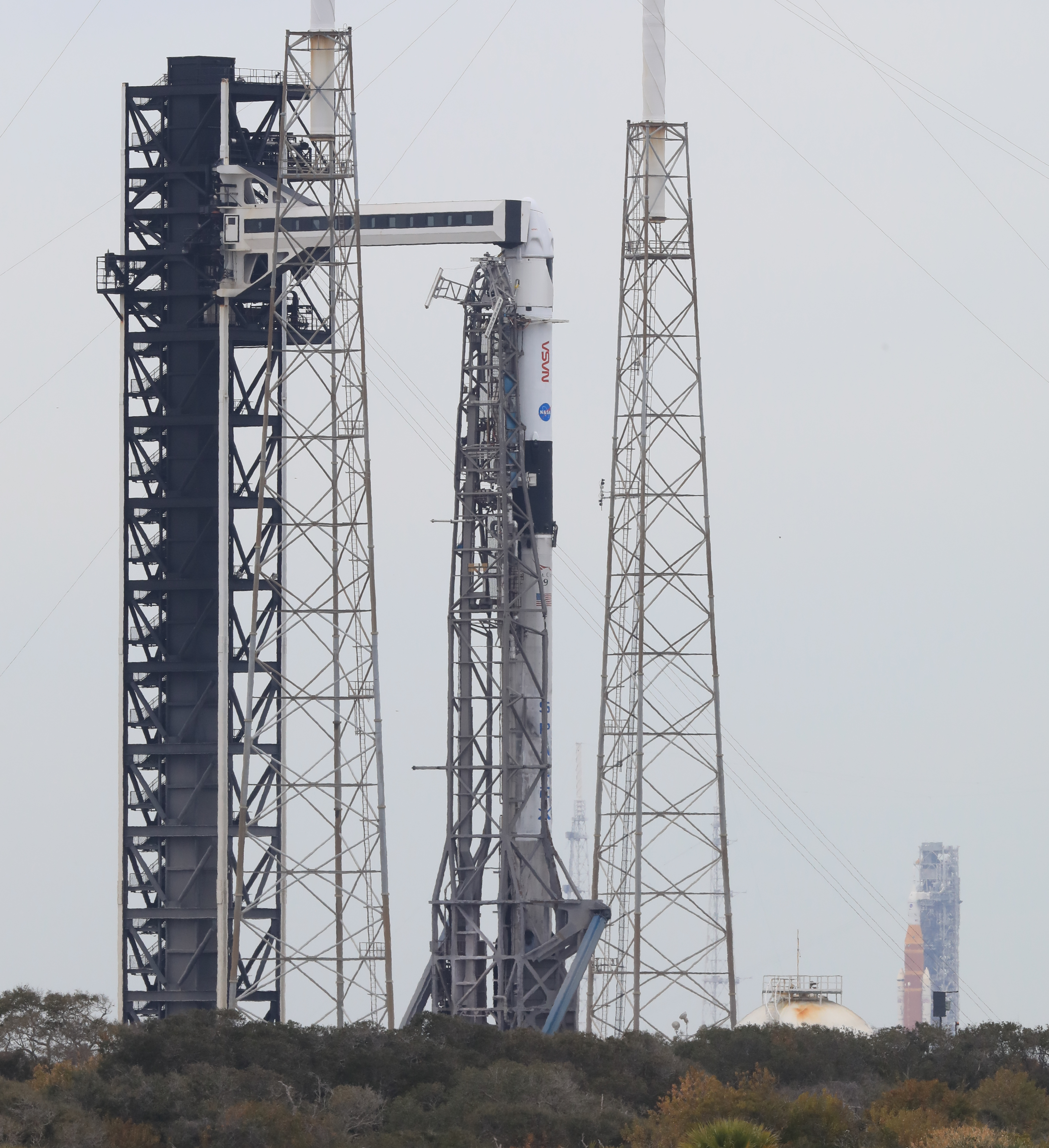
- Falcon 9 rocket and Crew Dragon Freedom await Crew-12 launch at SLC‑40, with the SLS rocket and Orion Integrity for Artemis II in the distance at LC-39B
- Names: USCV-12
- Mission type: ISS crew transport
- Operator: SpaceX
- COSPAR ID: 2026-031A
- SATCAT no.: 67796
- Mission duration: 237 days, 5 hours and 18 minutes

Spacecraft properties
- Spacecraft: Crew Dragon Freedom
- Spacecraft type: Crew Dragon
- Manufacturer: SpaceX

Crew
- Crew size: 4
- Members: Jessica Meir; Jack Hathaway; Sophie Adenot; Andrey Fedyaev
- Expedition: Expedition 74/75

Start of mission
- Launch date: 13 February 2026, 10:15:55 UTC (5:15:55 am EST)
- Rocket: Falcon 9 Block 5 (B1101.2), Flight 599
- Launch site: Cape Canaveral, SLC‑40

End of mission
- Recovered by: MV Shannon
- Landing date: 8 October 2026, 15:34:13 UTC (08:34:13 am PDT)
- Landing site: Pacific Ocean near Los Angeles (32.6°N 117.7°W)

Orbital parameters
- Reference system: Geocentric orbit
- Regime: Low Earth orbit
- Inclination: 51.63°

Docking with ISS
- Docking port: Harmony zenith
- Docking date: 14 February 2026, 20:15 UTC
- Undocking date: 7 October 2026, 12:05 UTC
- Time docked: 234 days, 15 hours and 50 minutes
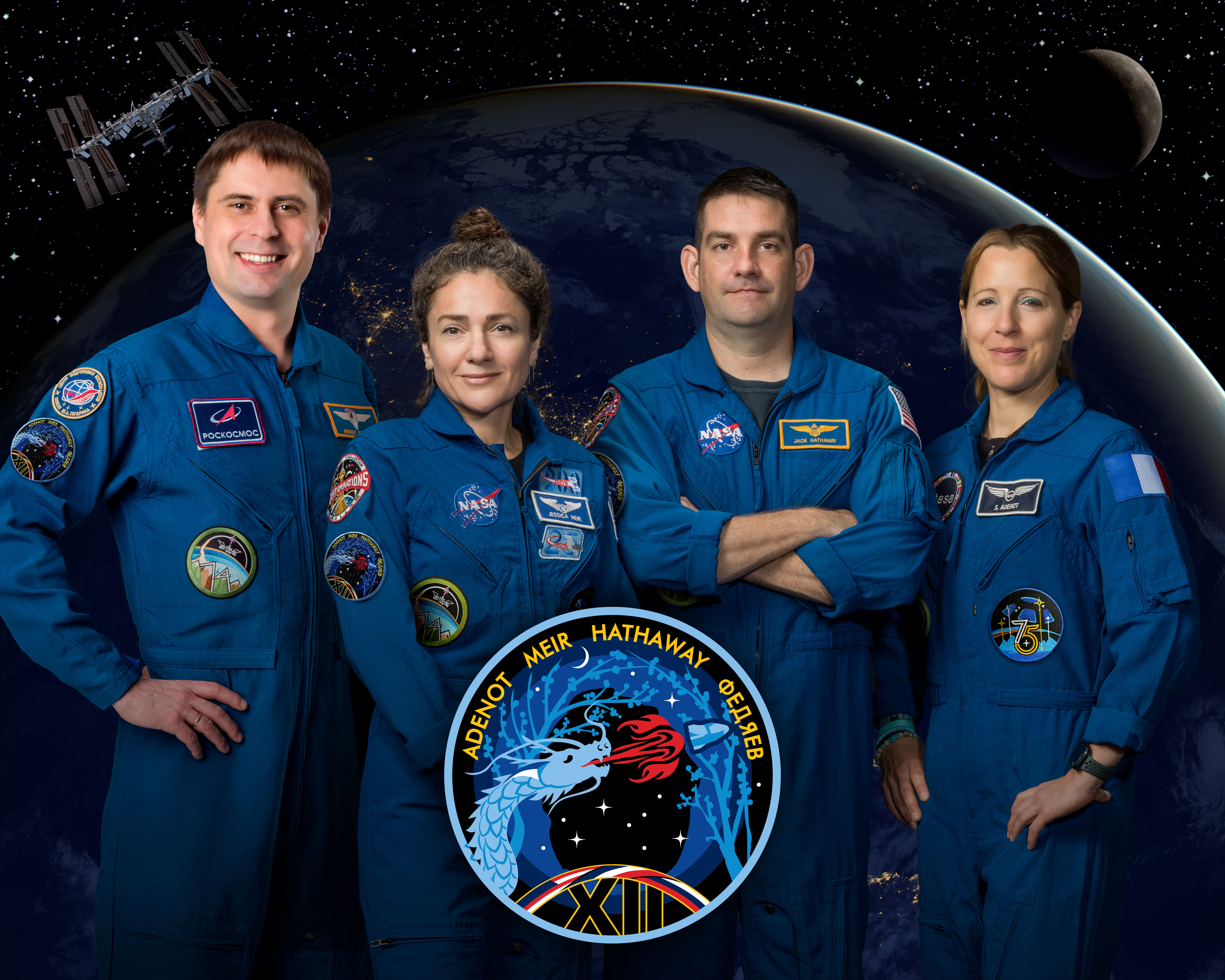
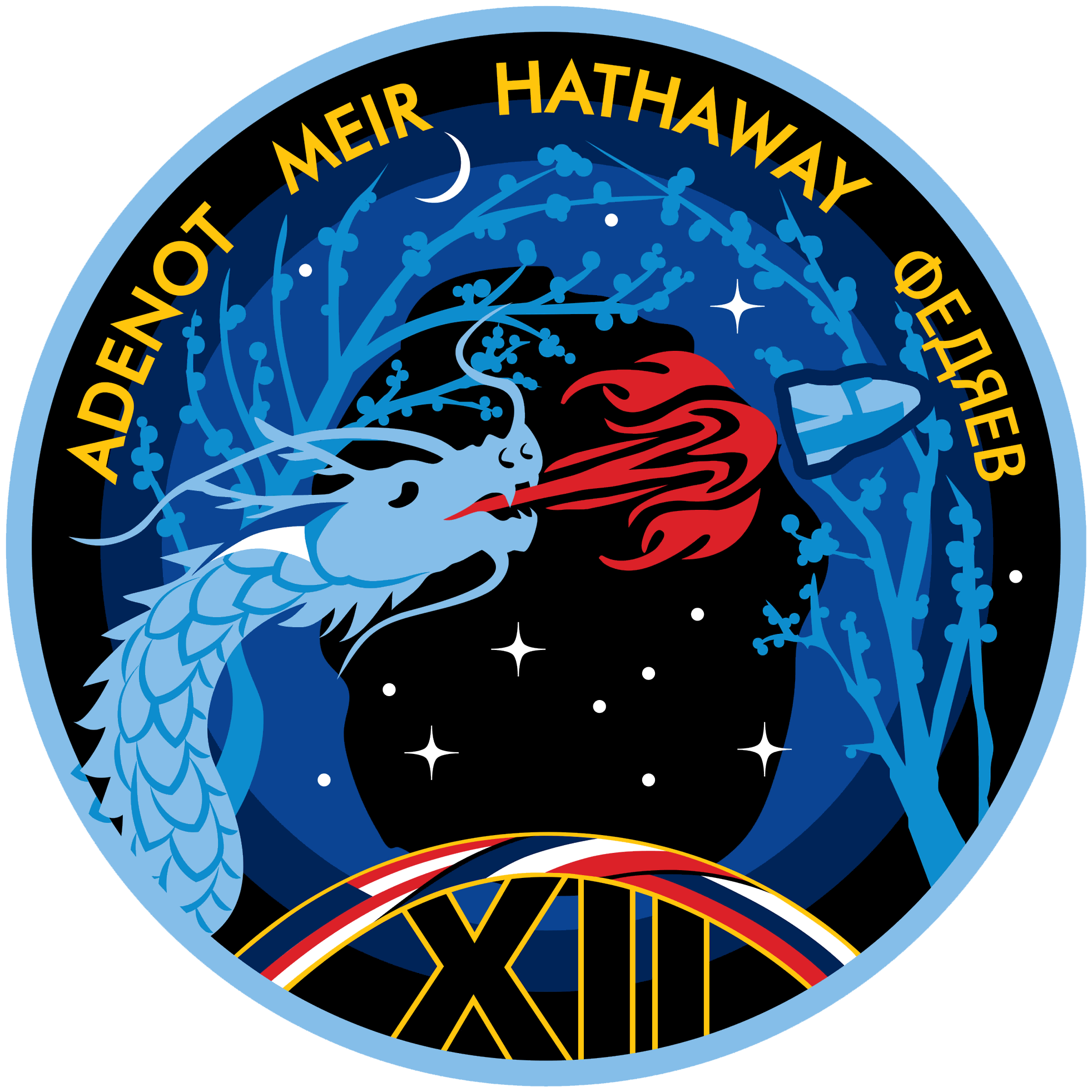
- NASA (left), SpaceX (middle), and ESA (right) mission patches From left to right: Fedyaev, Meir, Hathaway, and Adenot Commercial Crew Program Crew Dragon flights

SpaceX Crew-12 was the twelfth operational NASA Commercial Crew Program flight and the 20th crewed orbital flight of a Crew Dragon spacecraft. The mission transported four crew members—NASA astronauts Jessica Meir and Jack Hathaway, ESA astronaut Sophie Adenot, and Roscosmos cosmonaut Andrey Fedyaev—to the International Space Station (ISS). The mission launched on 13 February 2026.

== Crew ==
Prime crew
Position	Crew
Commander	Jessica Meir, NASA; Expedition 74/75; Second spaceflight
Pilot	Jack Hathaway, NASA; Expedition 74/75; First spaceflight
Mission specialist	Sophie Adenot, ESA; Expedition 74/75; First spaceflight
Mission specialist	Andrey Fedyaev, Roscosmos; Expedition 74/75; Second spaceflight

In December 2025, two and a half months before the launch, Russian cosmonaut Oleg Artemyev was abruptly removed from the Crew-12 mission, with Roscosmos officially citing his "transition to other work". However, investigative news site The Insider reported that Artemyev was expelled from the United States after being accused of violating International Traffic in Arms Regulations by photographing SpaceX engines, documents, and other technologies with his phone and then "exporting" that information. The alleged violation occurred at SpaceX's facility in Hawthorne, California, in late November and prompted an inter-agency investigation. Artemyev was replaced by cosmonaut Andrey Fedyaev, who became the first Russian to fly twice on Crew Dragon, reducing the amount of training required.

== Mission ==
The 12th operational SpaceX mission under NASA's Commercial Crew Program was scheduled for launch no earlier than 11 February 2026. Following the early return of the Crew-11 mission to Earth on 15 January 2026 due to a medical issue affecting one crew member, NASA and SpaceX evaluated options to advance the Crew-12 launch date in order to reduce the period during which the International Space Station operated with a reduced crew complement. However, on 9 February, NASA was forced to move the launch to 12 February due to unfavorable weather conditions in the ascent corridor. It was subsequently delayed again on 10 February with a new target date of 13 February.

The Crew-12 mission successfully lifted off on 13 February at 10:15 UTC. The launch marked the first use of a new Falcon 9 booster recovery site, the Landing Zone 40. Docking with ISS occurred, as expected, on 14 February at 20:15 UTC. After hatch opening at 22:14 UTC, the four astronauts entered the ISS, returning the station to its normal crew complement of seven in a rare indirect handover caused by the early return of Crew-11.

== Epsilon ==
On 20 June 2025, Josef Aschbacher shared that ESA's portion of the Crew-12 mission—astronaut Sophie Adenot's assignment—will be called Epsilon. This is Adenot's first trip to space. She was chosen in the 2022 European Space Agency Astronaut Group and became the first career astronaut (Note: The 2022 class is split into "career astronauts", who train for multiple long-duration missions and "project astronauts" who fly on single, short-duration missions. Two project astronauts from the class have flown on Axiom Space missions before Crew-12: Marcus Wandt on Ax-3 and Sławosz Uznański-Wiśniewski on Ax-4.) from that class to fly.

The mission patch features a stylized lowercase epsilon ("ε") in place of the "E" to symbolize a "small, yet impactful" variable to the "collaborative effort of space exploration". The patch also includes a hummingbird, highlighting how even the tiniest creatures play an important role in nature — tying back to the idea that every contribution matters.

During her stay on the ISS, Sophie Adenot took part in dozens of scientific and technological experiments including testing various French innovations in monitoring and protecting astronaut health. These included autonomous ultrasound scans, synchronized physiological sensors, and measuring bone density and blood flow, as well as monitoring and preventing biological contamination of surfaces.

On 29 May, 11 June, and 20 July 2026, Adenot tested a development version of the new European Intra-Vehicular Activity (IVA) space suit called EuroSuit, developed by French companies Spartan Space and Decathlon and the Institute of Space Medicine and Physiology (MEDES) for CNES. Her task was to evaluate the space suit's ergonomics, especially testing how easily it can be donned and doffed, as well as freedom of movement and manipulation with objects. The suit was transported to ISS aboard SpaceX CRS-34 in May 2026.

== Gallery ==
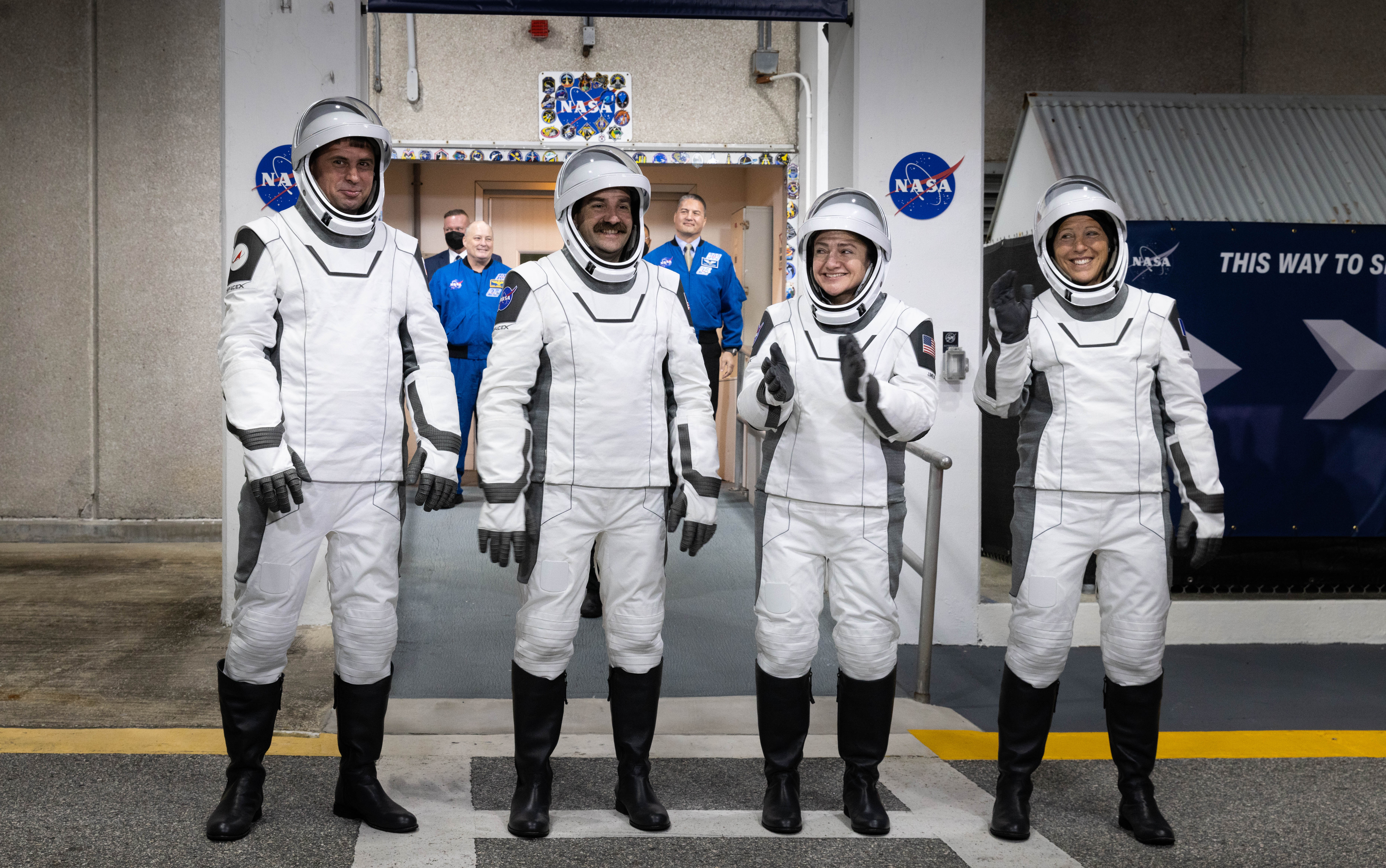
Crew-12 astronauts outside the O&C Building

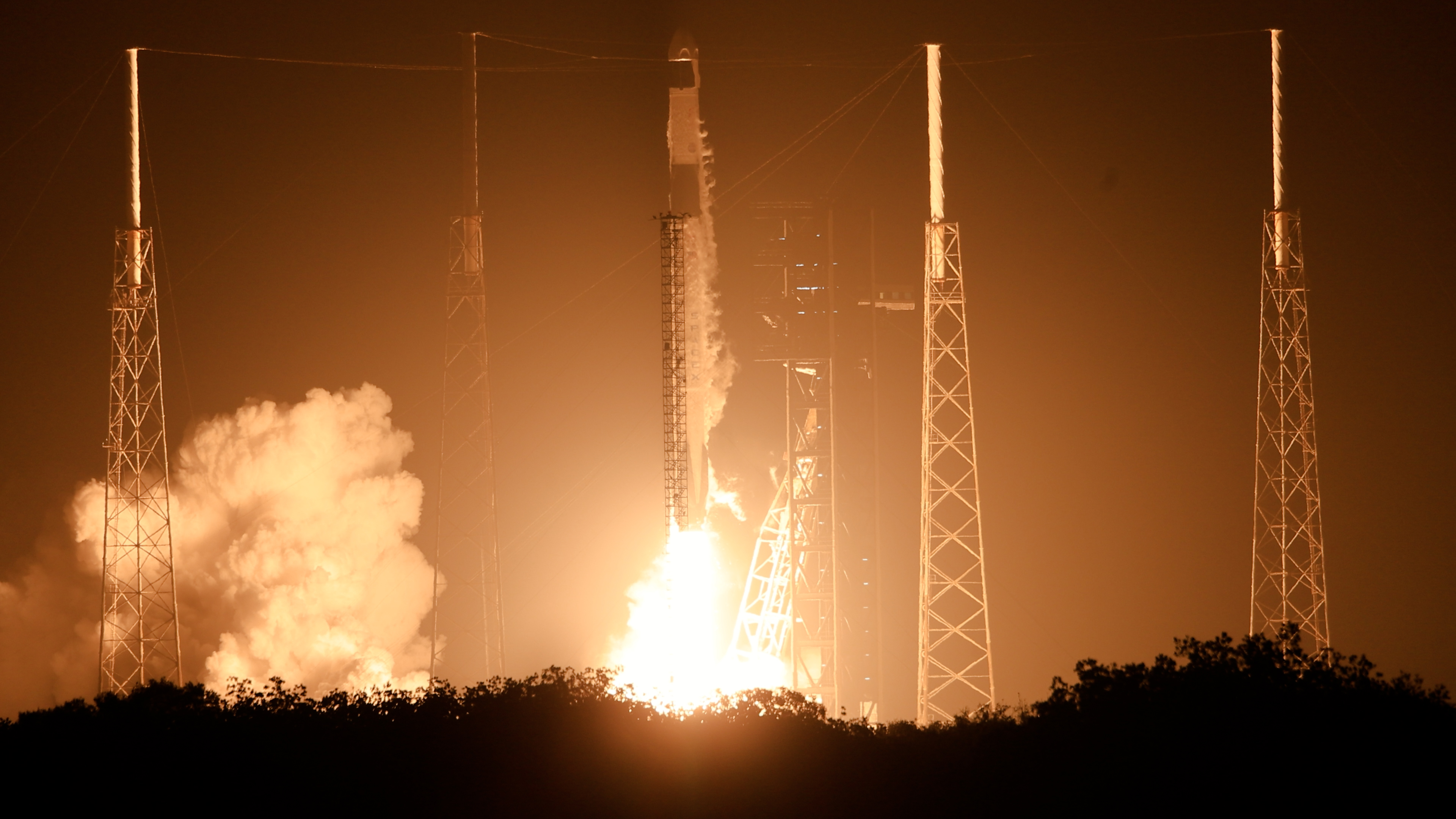
Crew-12 launch

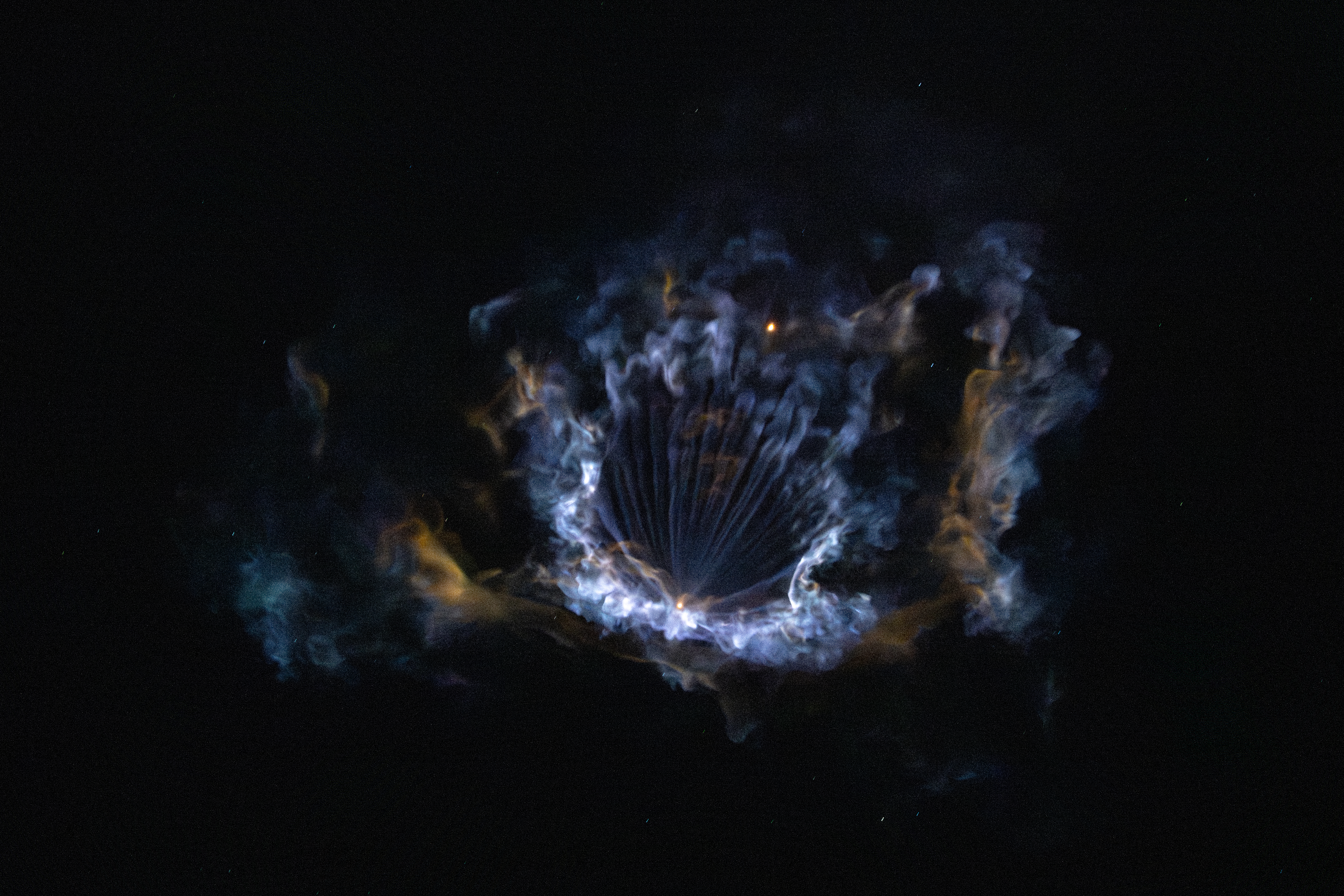
Falcon 9's exhaust plume during Crew-12 launch

Crew-12 before splashdown
