= Aerotrim =

Device used to train pilots and astronauts

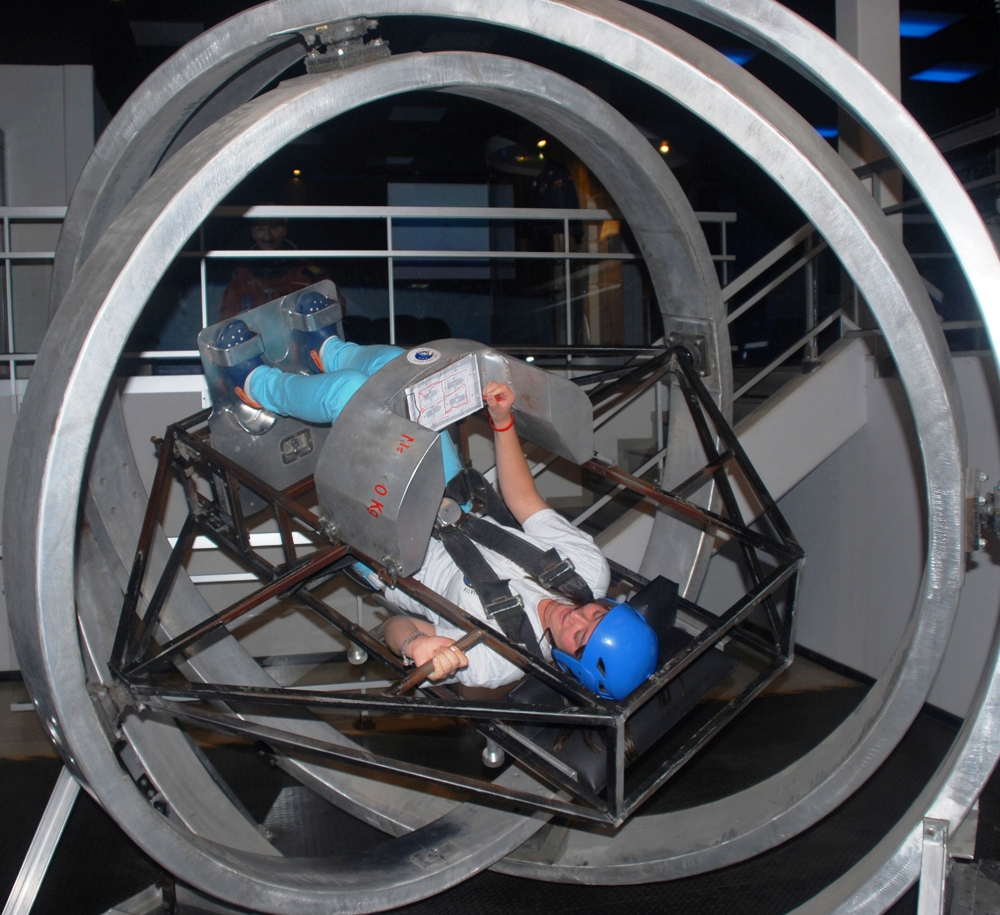
Multi-Axis Trainer at the Euro Space Center

An aerotrim (also known as Multi-Axis Trainer or MAT) is a 3-axis gimbal large enough to contain a human being, used for cardiovascular workout and equilibrioception (balance) training in pilots and astronauts. Aerotrims saw use in gyms during the 1980s, but are currently out of production outside of niche professional applications. A handful of machines are still in circulation, largely used for entertainment at fairs and events and as science fiction showpieces in movies and television. Several companies around the world have picked up the idea and produced their own version with slight changes. One of the originals, made in Korea, can be found in Slovenia at Aerotrim Ekopool Celje.

== History ==
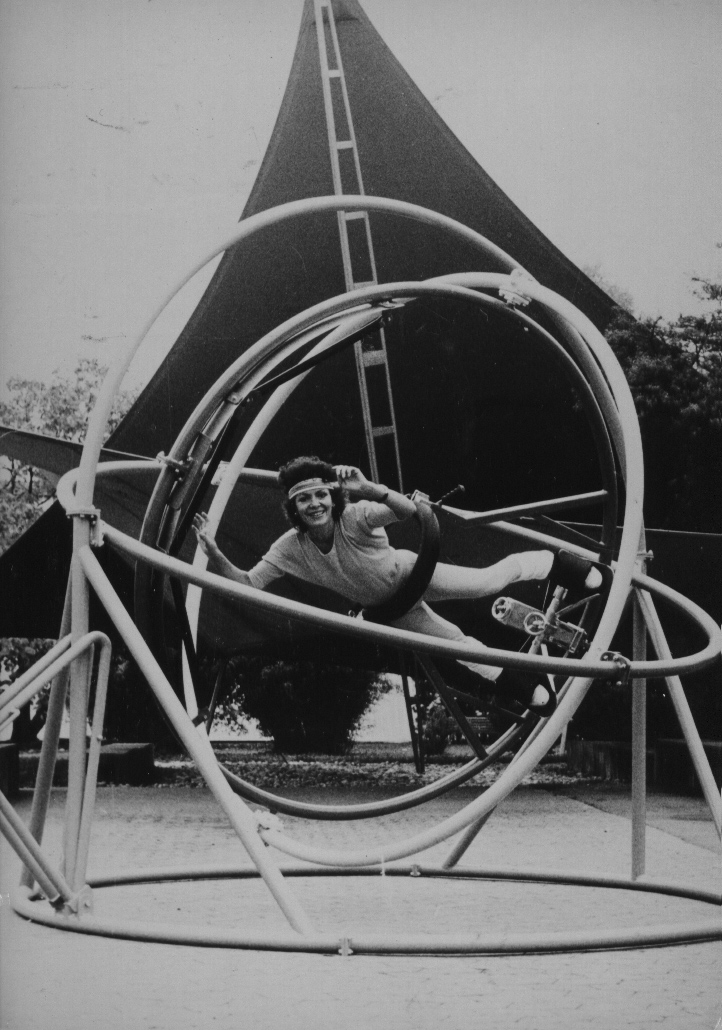
Mrs. Angie Dittrich as trainer in one of the first Aerotrims.

The earliest patents for gimballed devices built to carry humans date to 1907. There were several attempts to make similar machines over the next 80 years by various inventors. Several of them, such as the 1907 and the 1920 version, are rectangular in shape. However, the first patent application for a round-frame human gimbal set was made in July 1964.

The aerotrim, as it is known today, was originally conceived of in the early eighties by Helmut Suchy, an Austrian inventor, as a therapy for his ailing spine. Friends suggested its potential for use in gyms and hospitals. Suchy built the first prototype in his garage, attached to the walls, but it lacked general safety precautions, an adequate foot attachment mechanism, and was constrained in heights it could accommodate.

After unsuccessfully applying for a patent in Austria, Mr. Suchy transferred the rights to German entrepreneur Hermann Dittrich, whose import-export company Contactos Trading, GmbH, at great cost, applied internationally for a patent. Mr. Dittrich also chose the name Aerotrim over Suchy’s original 3D-Fun. To make the device safer, he added handles, overhead hand protectors made of Plexiglas, and the height-adjustable foot mechanism that allowed even children (of a minimum height) to use the machine. As a result, it passed even the German Technischer Überwachungsverein (TÜV) safety inspections. Aerotrims began production in Germany, Korea, Taiwan and the United States, where negotiations began to form a company named “Gyrotec” with the renowned US ski manufacturer Hart Ski Company and other investors. Contactos launched its own ad campaign, first in Germany, then expanding globally over the next few years.

== Use ==
Human strength is required to direct the motions by shifting the rider's body, and, as such, the Aerotrim does not cause dizziness or nausea if it is controlled by the rider themselves. During a forward or backward spin, command of the machine becomes limited, but it is still possible to flip out of a spinning loop and translate the momentum from forward motion to a sideways, backwards, horizontal or vertical spin. It is the only stationary exercise machine known to have the ability to move into any direction by counterbalance alone.

It is this control, or "wheeling", that requires every muscle in the body to be used evenly, even those not usually targeted by weight training or general cardiovascular exercise. In addition, according to Randy Huntington, a personal athletic coach, "One major advantage that the 'superstar' possesses is a highly evolved spatial consciousness and kinesthetic response mechanism. The aerotrim has benefits for athletes seeking to safely develop these attributes." Dr. John White, of the London, England Institute of Higher Education stated "It's not a gimmick, it's a very serious and important way of training... it's been particularly useful in blind people and also people with severe physical handicaps. It builds confidence, it allows them to work out in a totally new way, one they haven't experienced before." The spinning motion provides a feeling of weightlessness, and this feeling can create a healthy addiction. Douglas Raymond, a physical therapist stated 'There is no question that the aerotrim improves balance, coordination and spatial awareness in neurological disorders. The clinician is able to move the patients through all the planes either passively or actively.'" Regular users began to devise and name moves and routines, sometimes in synchrony with two or more machines.

In Germany, the aerotrim was often featured and used as a prop in movies, television series, commercials and even as a prize in game shows. On American television, it had been presented as a prop in several commercials, followed by sci-fi themed shows and movies, including Fortress, Gattaca, The Lawnmower Man (where it is called cyclosphere; however, it has been argued by purists that the machine featured here was only influenced by the Aerotrim) and more recently aboard Star Trek: Enterprise.

== Influence ==
Its large size and appearance made it a popular curiosity, drawing masses in its public appearances. It was readily featured in the general media, often in feature stories and cover pages. Its size and retail price made it unreasonable for most private owners and it was mainly sold to large gyms, hospitals and freestyle-ski resorts, often several at once.

It did not take long for the aeronautical community to see its value for equilibrium and weightlessness exercise. An entire fleet was acquired by Lufthansa, another by the Korean Air Force and several were used by the German Space Agency for astronaut training. Most European astronauts that went to the Mir space station used the aerotrim for preparation. A misconception emerged that the aerotrim was originally developed to prepare astronauts for weightlessness. This, however, is inaccurate, as the aerotrim, in addition to requiring human force to move, can only move under the influence of gravity. ESA still uses the machine for its official training programs, as well as part of its public training programs.

== Variations ==
Several variations of the original were produced, some by Contactos, some by other brands. These include a children’s version (MiniAerotrim), wheelchair versions suitable for use by paraplegics or quadriplegics, as well as motorized versions.

It has been used in sci-fi movies as both a training device for astronauts and as a virtual environment (VE) simulator as seen widely in the mid-nineties. With VR goggles and a joystick it could be used to play a few games, but since its motion is controlled by the user, its application for VE simulation was limited. A motorized version was introduced, which broadened its potential application for VE simulation. This version supported VEs in a head mounted display, 3-D binaural sound spacing and up to two joysticks, with either head tracking or user tracking based on the position of the gimbals.

== Patent concerns ==
A year after the launch, clones of the aerotrim appeared, and Contactos, owning worldwide patents by then, became entangled in its inaugural patent battle. USA, Italy, Korea, France, and other countries tried to avoid the patents by changing the foothold and even the shape (some companies produced square and even decagon shaped clones) as well as the firm hip support which made the aerotrim a controllable device. In subsequent years international lawyers were hired to handle the various court cases. Contactos won almost all of them, but the legal fees soon outweighed the company’s income from this project and Contactos had to keep on financing it through other business activities.

In a final move to save the aerotrim, Contactos passed on rights to an Irish company named Lifeway Ltd, but, due to cost complications, they were forced to cease production. About ten years after its birth, the last true aerotrim was produced in late 1990, and the patent rights were lost due to lack of interest in keeping them alive.

== See also ==
- Index of aviation articles
- Bárány chair
- G-seat
- R360
- Simulator sickness
