= RAF High G Training and Test Facility =

The RAF High G Training and Test Facility was opened on 4 February 2019 at RAF College Cranwell to provide high-G training to Royal Air Force and Royal Navy fast jet pilots.

The facility was created by Thales UK in collaboration with the RAF.

== Capabilities ==
The 39 tonne Human Training Centrifuge can accelerate up to 9G in one second, rotating up to 34 times a minute at speeds of 55mph.

== Usage ==
The simulator can be used by fast jet pilots to practice G-straining under the supervision of medical personnel. The system contains a flight simulator that allows the pilot to "fly" and apply the G-forces as they would in a real aircraft. This is aided by its ability to simulate pitch and roll. The cockpit can be configured to match a Hawk T2, Typhoon or F35B Lightning.

Pilots are expected to receive training on the simulator at least once every 5 years.
