= G-seat =

A G-seat, (also called a motion simulator seat, motion seat, or dynamic motion seat), is an exact replica of an ejection seat in a jet fighter, but equipped with additional systems that provide haptic feedback to the pilot in the seat. These seats translate simulated accelerations into pressure, tilt, vibration, and short‑range movement. This seat is not used on actual aircraft, but rather in flight simulators, especially those without a motion platform, like simulators of jet fighters and helicopters.

A type of G-seat for amusement purposes is a 2–3 DOF (Degrees of Freedom) motion seat. While this tech can also be used for flight and vehicle simulators for pilot and driver training, they are mostly used for 4D cinemas and theme‑park/VR attractions where synchronized motion enhances the storytelling and presence with the visuals and sounds. It reproduces vehicle and ride motions by moving the seat around two or three rotational axes (usually pitch and roll, plus optional yaw or heave), delivering fast, body‑centered cues—tilt, surge, vibration—that greatly enhance immersion without a full moving platform. This works with a system of integrates motors, actuators, and control electronics into a single seat assembly, so the occupant feels motion cues directly through their body providing convincing cues of acceleration, banking, bumps, and vibration. For safety they possess lap belts and/or harnesses, and their operators post health restrictions for motion sensitivity. For comfort and energy efficiency they feature a compact footprint (meaning it takes up relatively little physical space), fast response, and lower cost than full platforms.

== See also ==
- Index of aviation articles
- Aviation safety
- Link Trainer
- Bárány chair
- Aerotrim
- Jacobs Jaycopter
