= Hart Skis =

American downhill ski manufacturer

Hart Ski Corporation
- Type: Private
- Industry: Sports equipment
- Founded: 1955 (brand established)
- Headquarters: Ogden, Utah, USA
- Products: Downhill skis
- Website: http://www.hartskis.com/

Hart Ski Corporation is a United States based manufacturer of downhill skis, originally of St. Paul, Minnesota and currently headquartered in Ogden, Utah.

== Hart history ==
In 1943, Hartvig “Hart” Holmberg opened a carpentry shop in St. Paul, Minnesota, specializing in designing and manufacturing customized cribbage boards, chess sets and wood or metal card games. Word of Hartvig’s ability to create fine crafted goods quickly spread. Soon, the shop began to take on custom jobs using a variety of commercial manufacturing techniques, primarily custom painting and sheet metal work. This work led to fabricating runners for Ski-Doo snowmobiles.

Hartvig's brother Harry worked as a ski engineer and designer for Gregg Skis in St. Paul. Knowing that the addition of a seamless metal edge would revolutionize ski design, Harry called upon Hartvig’s manufacturing skills and together they began working on a prototype. They developed a laminated metal ski, with a continuous steel edge spot-welded to a perforated steel bottom sheet and an aluminum top sheet. After three years of creating and refining, Hartvig, Harry and friend Ed Bjork were ready. In 1955, the first "Hart" metal-edged ski was introduced.

At its peak in the late 1960s, Hart shipped 144,000 pairs of skis a year, achieving revenues in the tens of millions. It also was during the 1960s that freestyle skiing became a global phenomenon.

In 1968, the three original partners sold the company to Beatrice Foods, a conglomerate. Beatrice cut back on R&D, falling behind the competition as fiberglass skis were introduced. With sales plummeting, Beatrice sold Hart Ski in 1980 to an investor group, one of at least three groups that tried to revive the business in the next 18 years. By 1998, only 5,000 pairs of skis were shipped and the line was abandoned, until 2003, when another investor group led by the Grandson of Hartvig Holmberg, Bill Holmberg Jr.<reference >, resuscitated the label with a goal of resurrecting the Hart name. The company was refinanced and restructured as a type "C" Corp from an LLC in 2007, and corporate headquarters were moved to Ogden, Utah in 2010.

Hart skis are currently manufactured on an outsource contract basis in Colorado (Never Summer production facility), Washington State (Snow Board Parts Inc.) and Italy.

== Pioneer in freestyle skiing ==
The evolution of freestyle skiing can be traced to 1907, when the first ski flip was recorded. By the 1950s, Olympic skiers like Stein Erickson were performing front and back aerial somersaults during professional ski shows in Vermont and Colorado.

In 1965, Austrian gymnast Herman Goellner surpassed the single somersaults achieved by Erickson by performing the first double, triple and mobius (full-twisting) flips. Ski enthusiasts in Vermont were the first to witness the feats of Goellner and Tom Leroy, who performed simultaneous inverted aerials to the astonishment of large ski-show crowds.

In 1965, Swiss racer Art Furrer appeared on the U.S. ski scene. Claiming that increased agility through acrobatics on skis could improve ski performance, Furrer thrilled crowds. His stunts included “the butterfly,” “the Charleston” and a crossed-ski turn called the “javelin.” Furrer’s relationship with Hart Skis and his early appearance in ski press photos performing stunts made him “the face” of the 1960s freestyle movement.

Produced in 1966, the Hart-manufactured Javelin was one of the first skis in metal and fiberglass. Acrobatics were key to the success of the first extreme skiing movies, produced for Hart by Summit Films. These early films included, “The Incredible Ski,” “The Moebius Flip” and perhaps the most popular ever, “Ski the Outer Limits.”

Freestyle skiing was officially recognized in 1979 by the International Ski Federation and was introduced at the Olympics as a demonstration event at the 1988 Calgary Games. Mogul skiing became part of the official program for the Albertville Games in 1992—and aerials were added in 1994 during the Lillehammer Games.

== 1970s to 1990s ==
During the 1970s, Billy Kidd, Olympic medal winner, joined the company as an advisor and designer. In 1971, Kidd won the first World-Wide Championship Professionals wearing skis made by Hart. Hart also secured endorsements of ‘70s ski superstars like Suzy Chaffee, Hank Kashiwa and many others.

In 1984, the company introduced “The Comp,” which was the first ski to be made with a wood okume and honeycomb structure in aluminum. It was designed to be lighter and more versatile.

At the 1994 Olympic Games in Lillehammer, Norway, most American ski team members chose Freestyle by Hart, winning two medals — one silver and one gold.

After "The Comp,” Hart introduced its 1991 Comp SL. This new ski included a construction torsion box with aluminum honeycomb and an Internal Absorption Shock (IAS) system (guaranteeing optimal stability at elevated speeds).

In 1995, Hart athletes took center stage at the World of Freestyle in La Clusaz, France, winning six medals—including four gold.

== Today ==
Hart is an American ski company manufacturing handmade skis for both competitive athletes and discriminating skiers. With its sponsorship of the U.S. Freestyle Ski Team, Hart has 8 US Ski Team members and 6 Olympic athletes skiing on the Hart F17 World Cup and F17 Classic skis.

Hart athlete Patrick Deneen, of the U.S. Ski Team, skied his F17 World Cup skis to the 2009 FIS World Gold Medal in Inawashiro, Japan.

Bryon Wilson skied Hart's F17 Classic skis to a Bronze Medal in the 2010 Olympics in Vancouver, Canada.

In 2010, the company moved its headquarters from Minnesota to Ogden, Utah.

Japanese Ski Team Alpine racer Naoki Yuasa is a Hart slalom ski athlete. His best finish on Hart's as of this post was 3rd place on December 18, 2012 at Madonna di Campiglio, Italy.
