= Escadron d'Hélicoptères 1/67 Pyrénées =

Helicopter Squadron 1/67 Pyrénées
- Escadron d'Hélicoptères 1/67 Pyrénées
- Country: France
- Branch: French Air and Space Force
- Type: Military helicopter
- Garrison/HQ: Cazaux Air Base

Aircraft flown
- Transport: Eurocopter EC725 Caracal

Escadron d'Hélicoptères 1/67 Pyrénées is a French Air and Space Force squadron located at Cazaux Air Base, Gironde, France which operates the Eurocopter EC725 Caracal.

== See also ==
- List of French Air and Space Force aircraft squadrons
