= Luftwaffe Institute of Aviation Medicine =

German institute

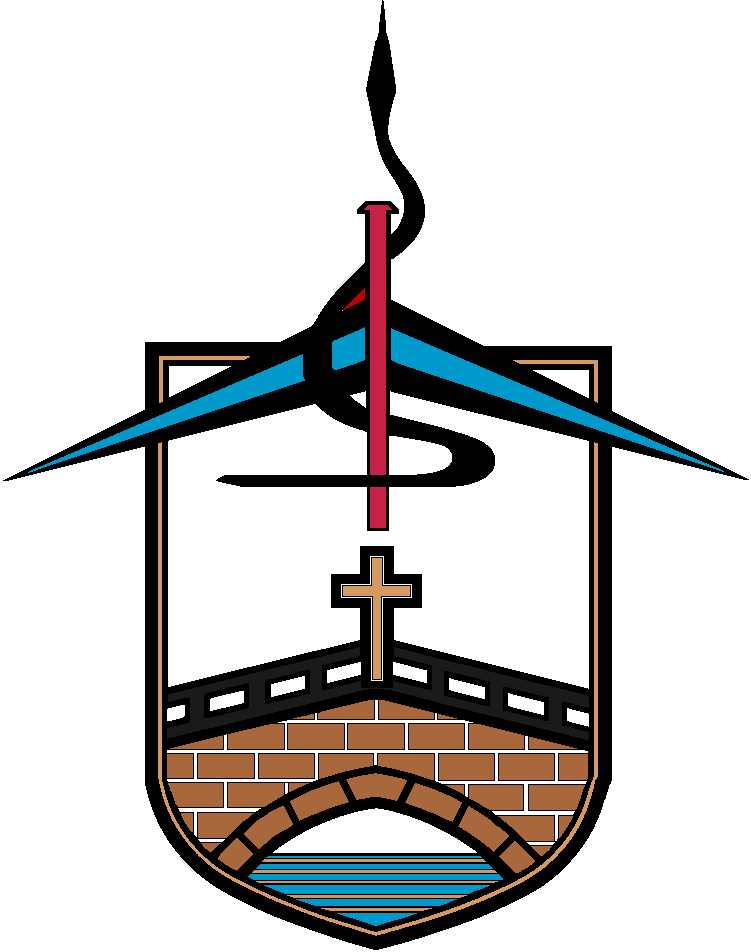
Coat of arms

The Luftwaffe Institute of Aviation Medicine, in German called Flugmedizinisches Institut der Luftwaffe (FLMEDINSTLW) is the central institute of aviation medicine of the German airforce (Luftwaffe). It was founded in 1959 and is located in Fürstenfeldbruck.

== Tasks ==
- scientific basic and advanced training for flight surgeons as well as further education
- medical examinations, observations and treatment of aircrew, ability tests
- appropriation of aeromedical expertise
- serves as an aeromedical center (AMC)
