= Jack Hathaway =

American astronaut (born 1982)

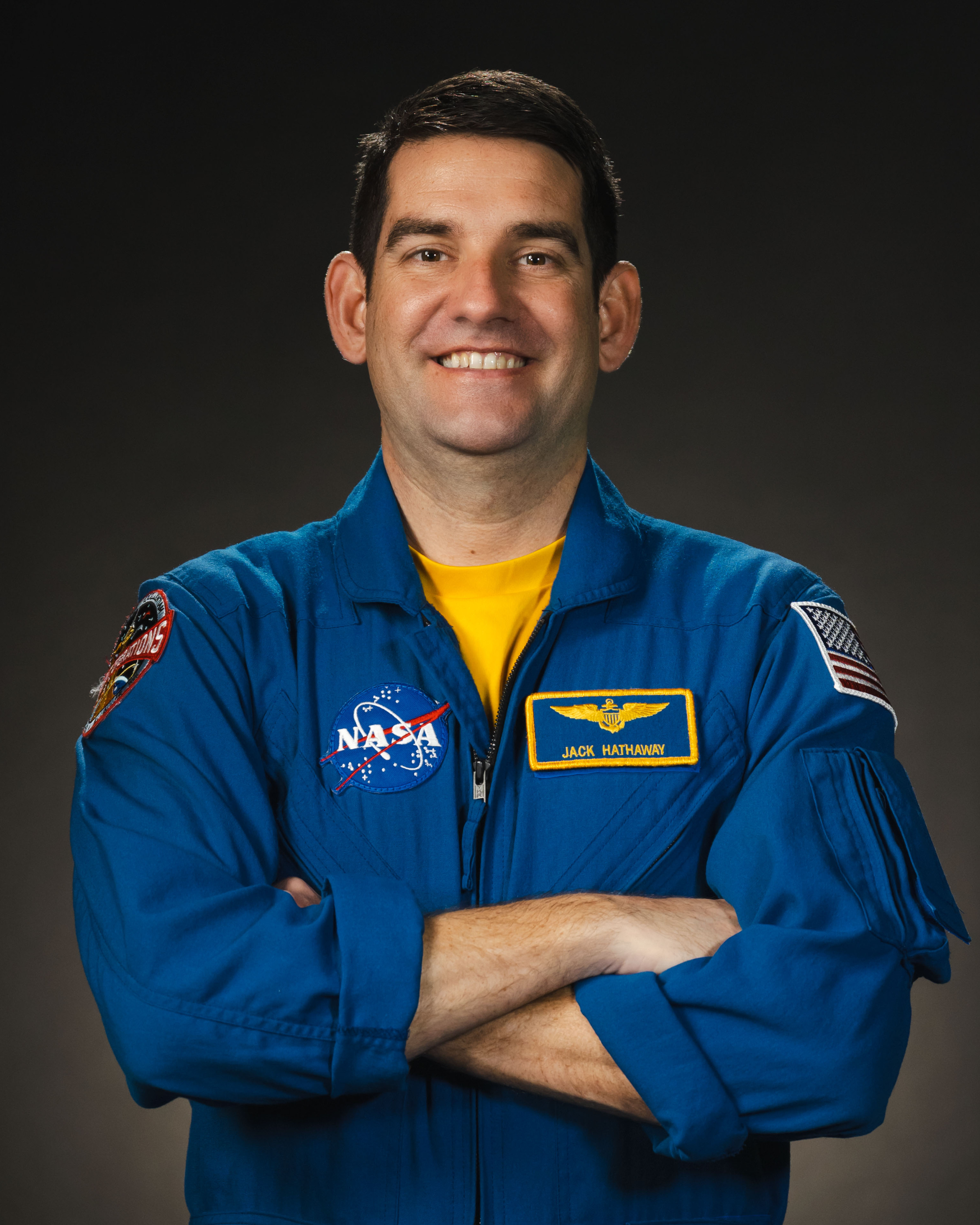
- Hathaway in 2024
- Born: May 10, 1982 (age 44); South Windsor, Connecticut, U.S.
- Education: United States Naval Academy (BS); Cranfield University (MS); Naval War College (MS)
- Awards: Defense Meritorious Service Medal; Strike Flight Air Medal; Navy Marine Corps Commendation Medal (2); Navy and Marine Corps Achievement Medal (2)
- Space career

NASA astronaut
- Time in space: 237 days, 5 hours, and 18 minutes
- Selection: NASA Group 23 (2021)
- Mission: SpaceX Crew-12 (Expedition 74/75)

Jack Hathaway (born 1982) is a commander in the United States Navy and NASA astronaut. He is from South Windsor, Connecticut.

== Early life and education ==
Hathaway was born and raised in South Windsor, Connecticut. Jack Hathaway graduated from South Windsor High School in South Windsor, Connecticut in 2000. He earned a bachelor's degree in physics and history from the U.S. Naval Academy in 2004. He earned a Master of Science in aerospace dynamics from Cranfield University in 2014, and a master's in national security and strategic studies from the U.S. Naval War College.

== Career ==
Hathaway attended the U.S. Naval Academy and was commissioned into the Navy in 2004 upon graduation. He was assigned to Naval Air Station, Lemoore, California, for transition to the F/A-18E. Hathaway flew and deployed with Strike Fighter Squadron 14 aboard the USS Nimitz and Strike Fighter Squadron 136 aboard the USS Harry S. Truman. He graduated from the British Empire Test Pilots' School at Boscombe Down, supported the Joint Chiefs of Staff at the Pentagon, and was most recently assigned as the prospective executive officer for Strike Fighter Squadron 81. He has more than 2,500 flight hours in 30+ types of aircraft, more than 500 carrier landings, and flew 39 combat missions.

== Astronaut candidacy ==
On December 6, 2021, he was revealed to be one of the 10 candidates selected in the 2021 NASA Astronaut Group 23. He reported for duty in January 2022, graduating from training in March 2024. He served as pilot for the SpaceX Crew-12, which launched to the ISS on February 13, 2026, where the crew served on Expedition 74/75.
