= Commercial Crew Program =

NASA human spaceflight program for the International Space Station

- Logo since 2014

Program overview
- Country: United States
- Organization: NASA; Boeing; SpaceX
- Purpose: ISS crew transport
- Status: Ongoing

Program history
- Duration: 2011–present
- First flight: SpaceX Crew-1; 16 November 2020 – 2 May 2021
- Successes: 12
- Launch sites: Cape Canaveral; Kennedy

Vehicle information
- Crewed vehicles: Crew Dragon; Starliner
- Launch vehicles: Falcon 9 Block 5; Atlas V N22

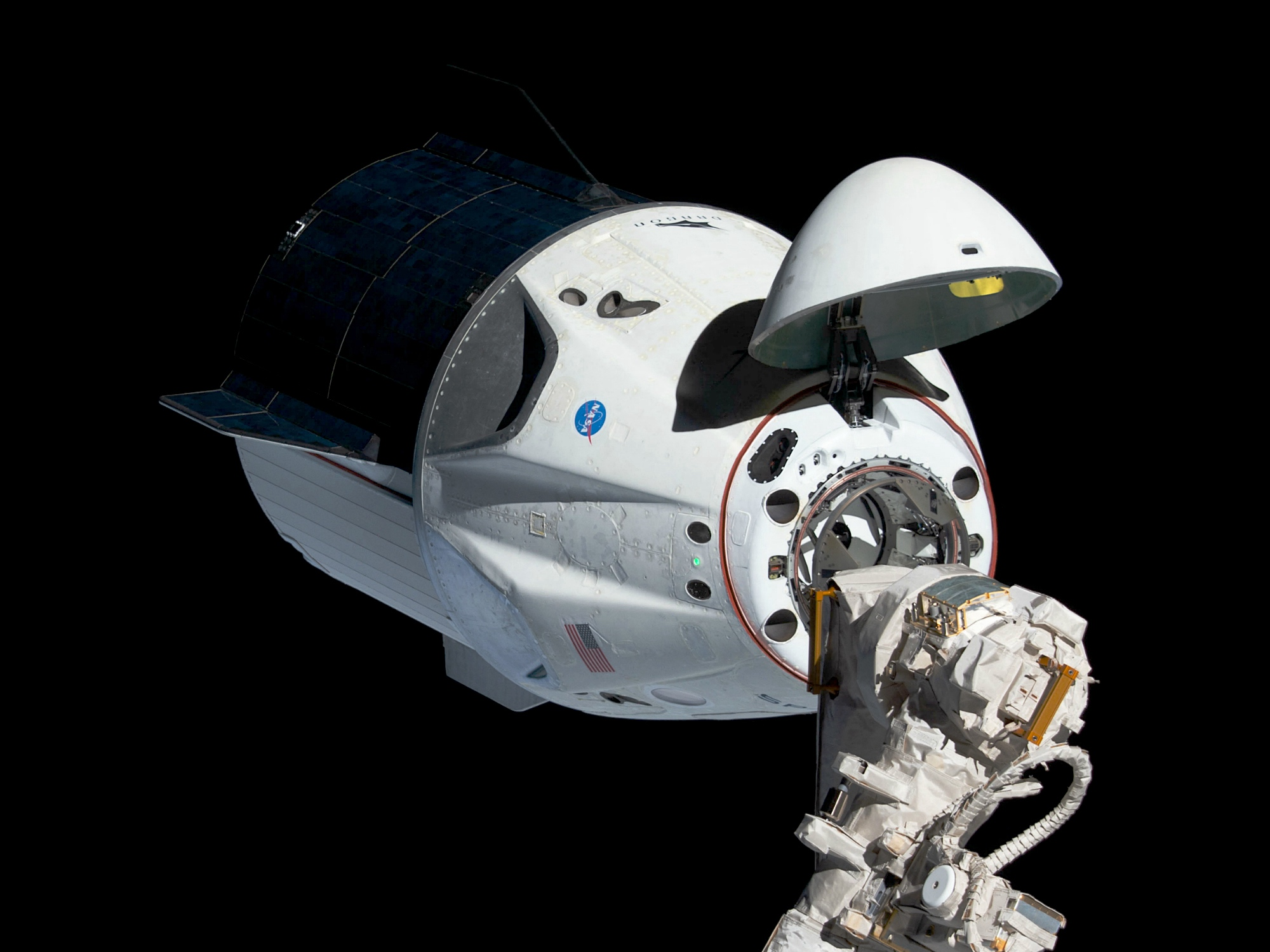
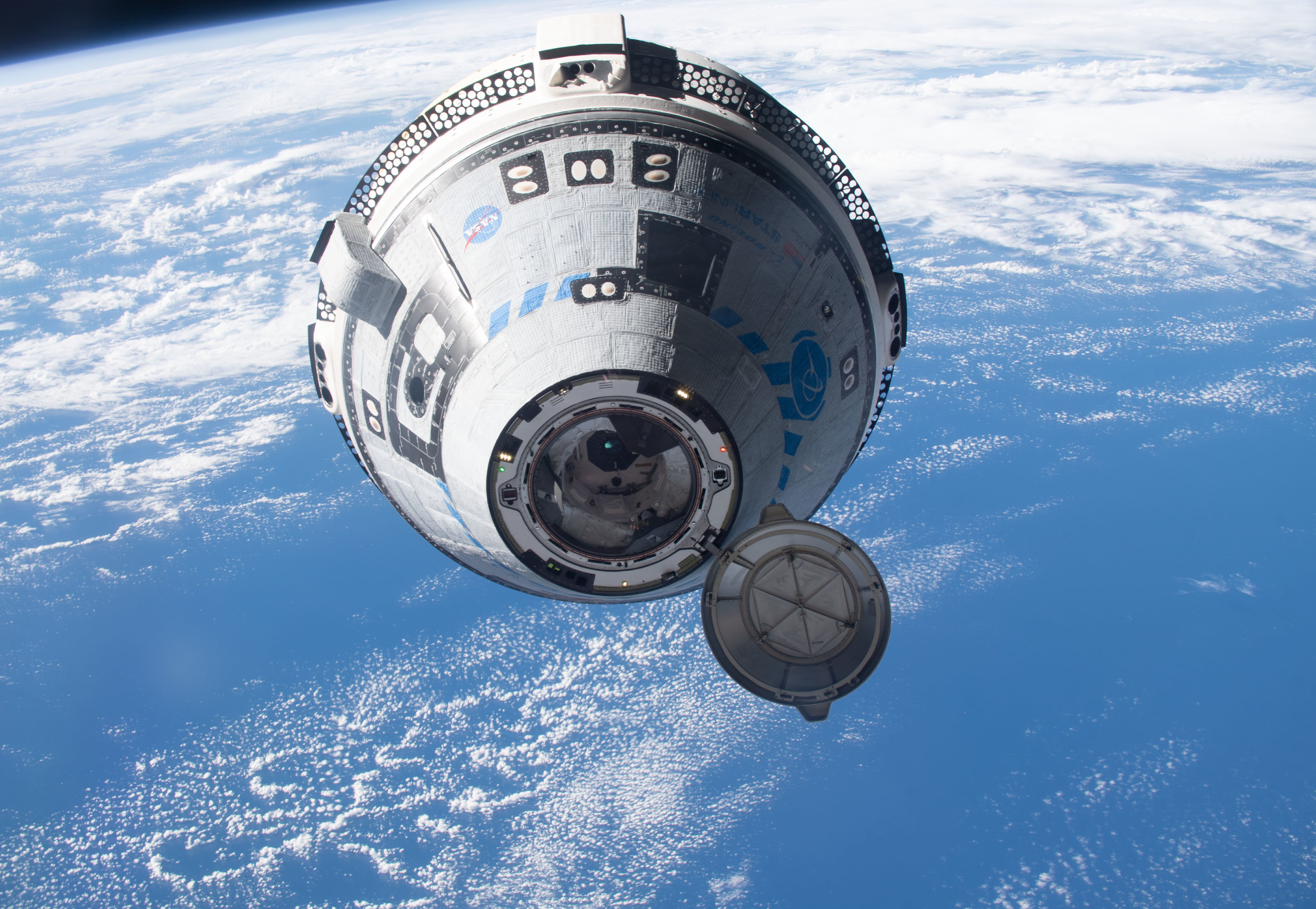
The Crew Dragon (left) and Starliner (right) approaching the ISS on their respective missions

The Commercial Crew Program (CCP) provides commercially operated crew transportation service to and from the International Space Station (ISS) under contract to NASA, conducting crew rotations between the expeditions of the International Space Station program. The American space manufacturer SpaceX began providing service in 2020, using Crew Dragon, and NASA plans to add Boeing when Starliner becomes human rated no earlier than 2030.

The spacecraft are owned and operated by the vendor, and crew transportation is provided to NASA as a commercial service. Each mission sends up to four astronauts to the ISS. Operational flights occur approximately once every six months for missions that last for approximately six months. A spacecraft remains docked to the ISS during its mission, and missions usually overlap by at least a few days. Between the retirement of the Space Shuttle in 2011 and the first operational CCP mission in 2020, NASA relied on the Soyuz program to transport its astronauts to the ISS.

A Crew Dragon spacecraft is launched to space atop a Falcon 9 Block 5 launch vehicle and the capsule returns to Earth via splashdown in the ocean near Florida. The program's first operational mission, SpaceX Crew-1, launched on 16 November 2020. Boeing Starliner spacecraft will participate no earlier than 2027 after additional flight tests, launched atop an Atlas V N22 launch vehicle. Instead of a splashdown, a Starliner capsule will return on land with airbags at one of four designated sites in the western United States.

Development of the Commercial Crew Program began in 2011 as NASA shifted from internal development of crewed vehicles to perform ISS crew rotation to commercial industry development of transport to the ISS. A series of open competitions over the following two years saw successful bids from Boeing, Blue Origin, Sierra Nevada, and SpaceX to develop proposals for ISS crew transport vehicles. In 2014, NASA awarded separate fixed-price contracts to Boeing ($4.2 billion) and SpaceX ($2.6 billion) to develop their respective systems and to fly astronauts to the ISS. Each contract required four successful demonstrations to achieve human rating for the system: pad abort, uncrewed orbital test, launch abort, and crewed orbital test. Operational missions were initially planned to begin in 2017, with missions alternating between the two providers. Delays required NASA to purchase additional seats on Soyuz spacecraft up to Soyuz MS-17 until Crew Dragon missions commenced in 2020. Crew Dragon continues to handle all missions until Starliner becomes operational, no earlier than 2027.

== Background ==
In 2004, the Aldridge Commission – established by President George W. Bush following the Space Shuttle Columbia disaster – called in its final report for crewed flights to the Moon with a Crew Exploration Vehicle. After the NASA Authorization Act of 2005, the Constellation program was established, which envisioned a revised Crew Exploration Vehicle named Orion conducting crew rotation flights to the International Space Station (ISS) in addition to its lunar exploration goals. Orion superseded the Orbital Space Plane, which was designed for ISS crew rotation. In 2009, the Augustine Commission appointed by President Barack Obama found that the program's funding and resources were insufficient to execute its goals without delays and another US$3 billion, which prompted NASA to consider alternatives. The Constellation program was cancelled in 2010. NASA redirected Orion development to handle exploration beyond Earth. It also began hiring commercial companies to handle ISS crew rotation and other crewed missions in low Earth orbit after the Space Shuttle program ended in 2011. This arrangement would end NASA's dependency on Roscosmos' Soyuz program to deliver its astronauts to the ISS.

== Development ==
=== CCDev awards ===
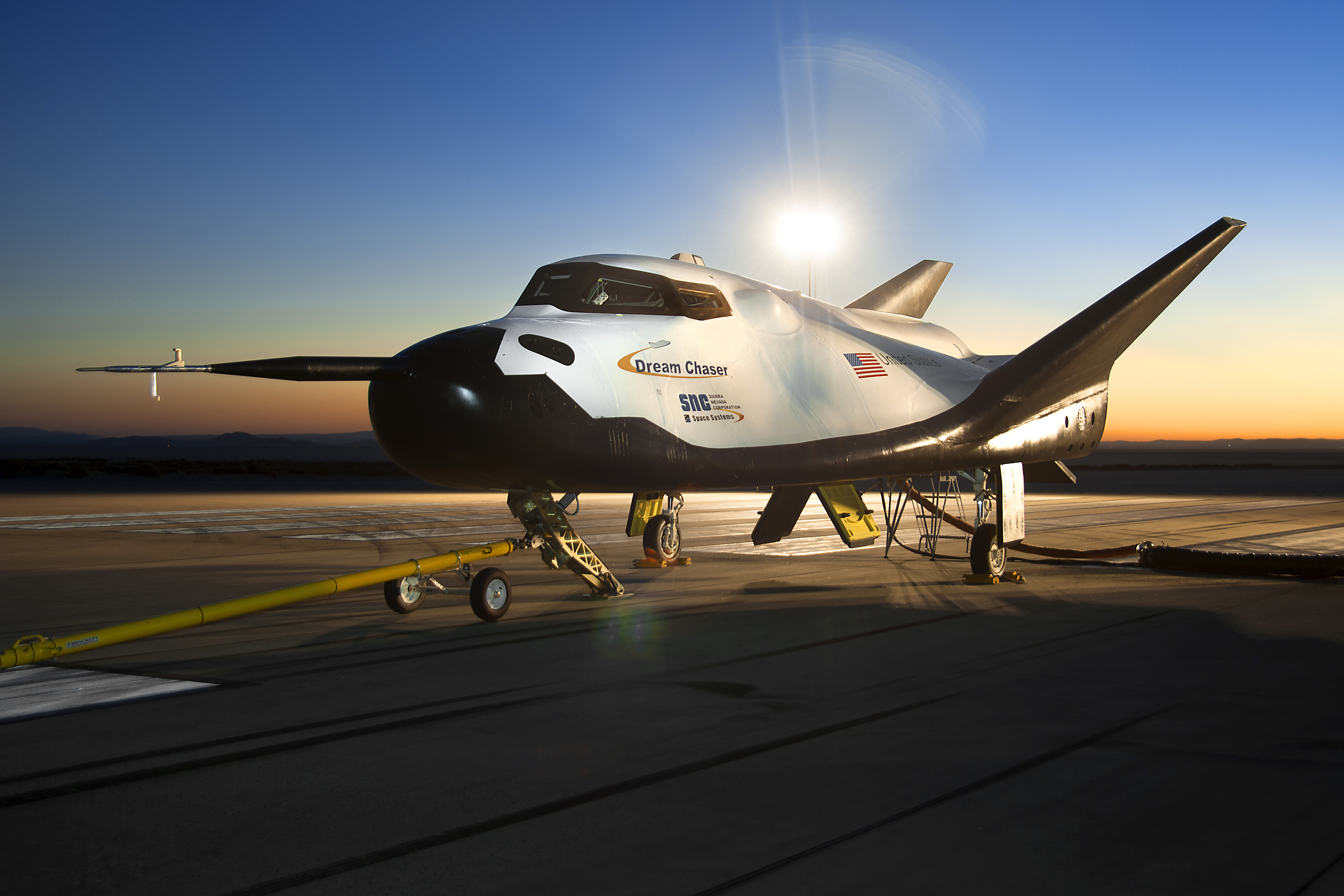
Sierra Nevada's Dream Chaser, non-selected finalist

The NASA Authorization Act of 2010 allocated US$1.3 billion for an expansion of the existing Commercial Crew Development (CCDev) program over three years. While the program's first round of competition in 2010 focused on funding development of various human spaceflight technologies in the private sector as part of the American Recovery and Reinvestment Act, its second round, CCDev 2, focused on proposals for spacecraft capable of shuttling astronauts to and from the ISS. The competition for CCDev 2 funding concluded in April 2011, with Blue Origin receiving US$22 million to develop its biconic nose cone capsule concept, SpaceX receiving US$75 million to develop a crewed version of their Dragon spacecraft and a human-rated Falcon 9 launch vehicle, the Sierra Nevada Corporation receiving US$80 million to develop the Dream Chaser, and Boeing receiving US$92.3 million to develop the CST-100 Starliner. SpaceX had previously been contracted by NASA to operate ISS resupply flights with their Dragon spacecraft, as part of NASA's Commercial Resupply Services. The program's third round, Commercial Crew integrated Capability (CCiCap), aimed to financially support the development of winning proposals over 21 months through to May 2014, in preparation for crewed missions to the ISS within five years. Despite winning awards in CCDev 1 and CCDev 2, Blue Origin decided against competing in CCiCap, opting instead to rely on private investment from their owner, Jeff Bezos, to continue development on crewed spaceflight. The competition for CCiCap funding ended in August 2012, with US$212.5 million allocated to Sierra Nevada's Dream Chaser, US$440 million allocated to SpaceX's Crew Dragon, and US$460 million allocated to Boeing's Starliner. While Alliant Techsystems's integrated Liberty launch vehicle and spacecraft was a finalist, it was rejected due to concerns about the lack of detail in Alliant Techsystems's proposal.

Operational crewed spacecraft (at least orbital class) as of Oct. 2024

In December 2012, the three CCiCap winners were each given an additional US$10 million in funding as the first of two series of "certification products contracts" (CPC) to allow for further testing, engineering standards, and design analysis to meet NASA's safety requirements for crewed spaceflight. The second CPC series manifested as Commercial Crew Transportation Capability (CCtCap), the final phase of the CCDev program, where NASA would certify an operator to run crewed flights to the ISS through an open competition. The window for proposal submissions was closed on 22 January 2014. Sierra Nevada announced a week later that a privately funded orbital test flight of a Dream Chaser spacecraft, using an Atlas V launch vehicle intended to be purchased by Sierra Nevada, was planned to occur on 1 November 2016. On 16 September 2014, CCtCap concluded with SpaceX's Crew Dragon and Boeing's Starliner being the sole winners, with SpaceX receiving US$2.6 billion contract and Boeing a US$4.2 billion contract. Sierra Nevada filed a protest with the Government Accountability Office (GAO) in response, citing "serious questions and inconsistencies in the source selection process." The United States Court of Federal Claims upheld a decision to allow development of the Crew Dragon and Starliner to proceed during the protest, citing concerns for crewed operations of the ISS in the event of a delay to the Commercial Crew Program. The GAO declined Sierra Nevada's protest in January 2015, stating that evidence gathered by the GAO discredited Sierra Nevada's claims against NASA; Sierra Nevada accepted the decision. The company laid off 90 staff members working on the Dream Chaser following the CCtCap result, and repurposed the spacecraft as a for-hire vehicle for commercial spaceflight. A cargo variant of the Dream Chaser would later be developed and selected by NASA to fly uncrewed resupply missions to the ISS under a Commercial Resupply Services 2 contract.

=== Post-selection ===
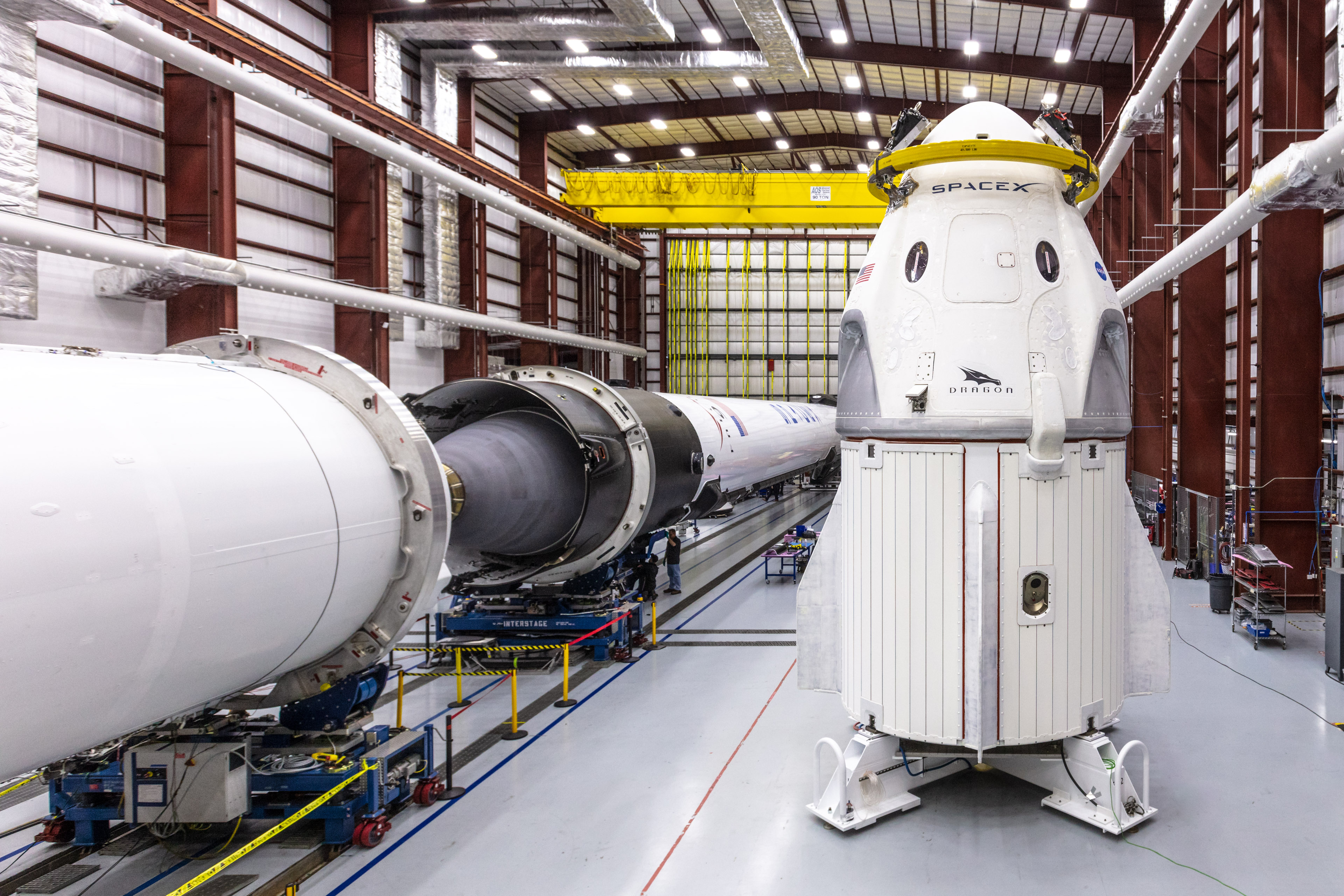
Crew Dragon C204 (right), later destroyed during testing

While the first flights of Commercial Crew Program were originally intended to be launched by the end of 2017, Boeing announced in May 2016 that their first crewed flight would be delayed to 2018 due to problems integrating with Starliner's Atlas V N22 launch vehicle. In December 2016, SpaceX announced their first crewed flights would also be delayed to 2018, following the loss of AMOS-6 in an accidental launch pad explosion of a Falcon 9, the Crew Dragon's launch vehicle. With no further flights in the Soyuz program for American astronauts past 2018, the GAO expressed concerns and recommended in February 2017 that NASA develop a plan for crew rotation in the event of further delays. Following the settlement of a lawsuit against Russian space manufacturer Energia over Sea Launch, Boeing received options for up to five seats on Soyuz flights, which NASA purchased from Boeing. NASA announced the astronauts chosen to pilot the Crew Dragon and Starliner vehicles in August 2018, and two months later penned the launch of demonstration missions for the Crew Dragon and Starliner for dates in 2019. The uncrewed SpaceX Demo-1 mission was launched on 2 March 2019, in which a Crew Dragon successfully docked with the ISS and returned to Earth six days after launch. The capsule used in the mission, however, was accidentally destroyed in a static fire test of its SuperDraco engines in April 2019, causing further delays to launch of future Crew Dragon flights. The Boeing Orbital Flight Test and Boeing Crew Flight Test, which had both been delayed due to a failed test of Starliner's abort system, were further pushed without explanation from dates in early-to-mid 2019 to late 2019.

Boeing conducted the Boeing Pad Abort Test in November 2019. NASA accepted the test as successful even though one of three parachutes failed to deploy, since the system landed as designed under two parachutes. Boeing conducted the Orbital Flight Test in December 2019 and encountered major malfunctions of Starliner's software which precluded an intended docking with the ISS and prompted a truncation of the mission. The Orbital Flight Test was declared a "high-visibility close call" by NASA following an independent review, (Note: "High-visibility mishap" and "high-visibility close call" are designations which describe incidents that impact the mission's spacecraft and/or crew with a high degree of public, media, and/or political attention. "High-visibility close call" had previously been used to describe an aborted EVA during Expedition 36.) and a second Orbital Flight Test (Boeing OFT-2) was scheduled for July 2021, with Boeing covering the cost of the flight in lieu of additional CCDev funding. Amid further uncertainties about the Commercial Crew Program's progress, NASA purchased a seat on the Soyuz MS-17 mission to ensure participation in Expedition 64 in the event that operational missions in the program are further delayed, with the purchase of additional Soyuz seats beyond MS-17 being described as a possibility. The SpaceX In-Flight Abort Test was successfully conducted in January 2020, setting the stage for the final, crewed test flight of Crew Dragon – SpaceX Demo-2 – which launched astronauts Bob Behnken and Doug Hurley to the ISS in May 2020. SpaceX launched its first operational flight, SpaceX Crew-1, on 16 November 2020. It stayed docked to the ISS as planned until 2 May 2021. SpaceX Crew-2 launched on 23 April 2021 and it landed on 9 November 2021, two days before the launch of SpaceX Crew-3. When Boeing OFT-2 was on the pad preparing for launch on 3 August 2021, problems were encountered with 13 valves in the capsule's propulsion system. The launch was scrubbed, and the capsule eventually returned to the factory. Analysis of the problem was still underway in September 2021 and launch was postponed indefinitely. This uncrewed test, Boeing Orbital Flight Test 2, launched on 19 May 2022, and landed successfully on 25 May.

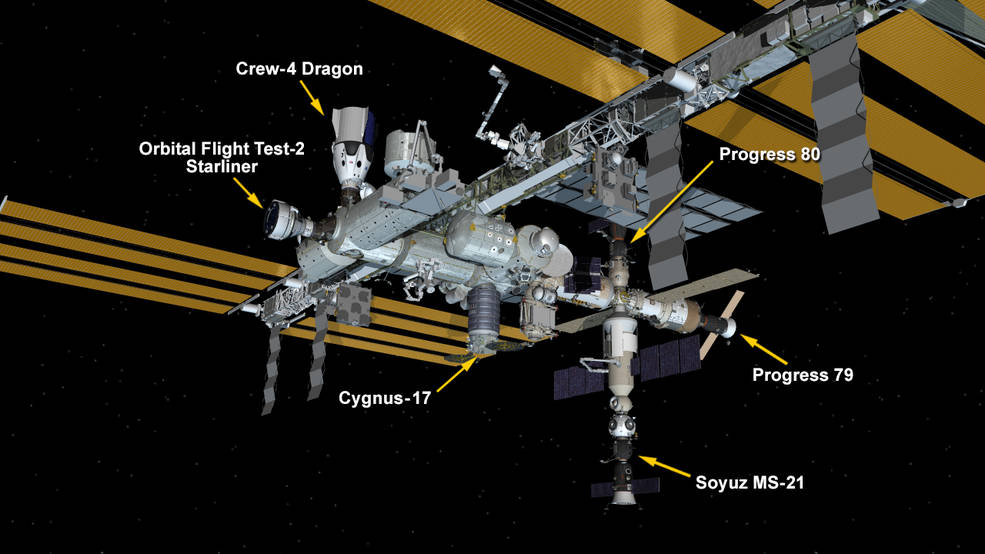
Both commercial Crew vehicles Crew Dragon and Starliner docked to ports on harmony module at the same time

On February 28, 2022, NASA announced that it had awarded three additional crew missions to SpaceX bringing the total crew missions for SpaceX to nine and the total contract value to $3,490,872,904. In September 2022, NASA announced yet another addition, this time of five missions, bringing the total to fourteen and the total contract value to $4.93 billion.

== Spacecraft ==
The Commercial Crew Program uses the SpaceX Crew Dragon to shuttle astronauts to and from the ISS. The Boeing CST-100 Starliner will join it in this role after it is human-rated. Both spacecraft are automated but can be remotely controlled from the ground or manually controlled by their crew via touch screens in case of an emergency. The crew cabins of both spacecraft feature 11 cubic meters (390 cubic feet) of pressurized volume, and can be configured to carry up to seven crew each, though NASA will only send up to four crew on each mission in the program; an extension to occupy a fifth seat is available to NASA. Both spacecraft are certified to last up to 210 days (Note: NASA extended this to 240 days for Crew-8 to allow it to support the CFT) docked to the ISS. In addition, the spacecraft were designed to meet NASA's per-mission safety standard of a 1-in-270 chance of catastrophic failure, which is less risky than the 1-in-90 chance of the Space Shuttle.

The spacecraft and the ISS have docking mechanisms that implement the International Docking System Standard (IDSS). The NASA Docking System implementation is used by Starliner and ISS, while Crew Dragon uses a compatible IDSS implementation developed by SpaceX. The IDSS docks are used instead of the Common Berthing Mechanism used by previous Commercial Orbital Transportation Services spacecraft such as the first-generation Dragon.

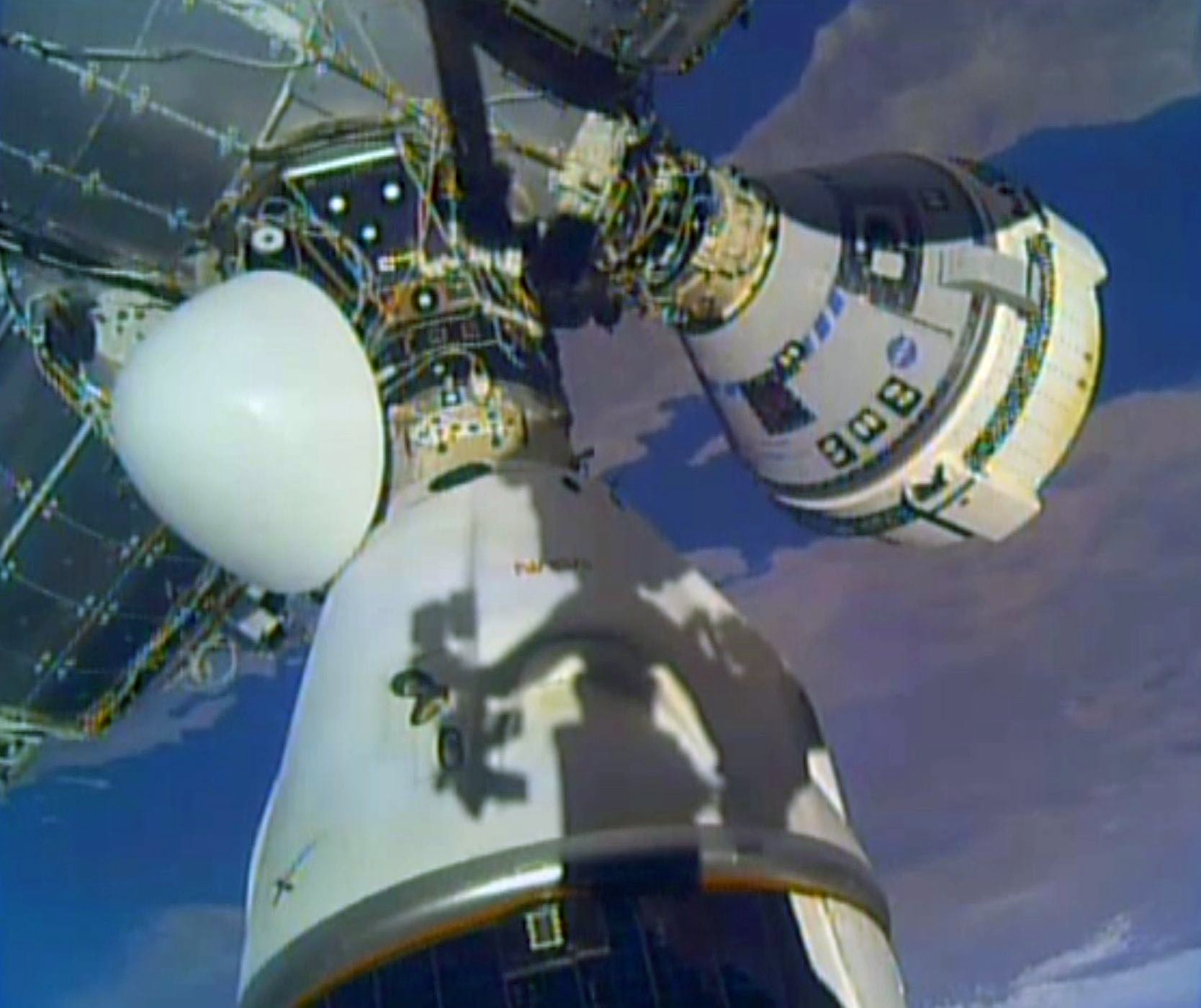
Commercial Crew Program vehicles docked to ISS at the same time

=== Crew Dragon ===
SpaceX's Crew Dragon is a variant of the company's Dragon 2 class of spacecraft, which is an upgraded version of the first-generation Dragon. It measures 3.7 meters (12 feet) wide, 4.4 meters (14 feet) tall without its trunk, and 7.2 meters (24 feet) with its trunk. While trunks are discarded prior to capsule reentry, crew cabins are designed to be reusable. After earlier plans of SpaceX to use new capsules for every crewed flight for NASA both agreed to reuse Crew Dragon capsules for NASA flights. In 2022, SpaceX stated that a capsule can be reused up to fifteen times. Crew Dragon spacecraft can spend up to a week in free flight without being docked to the ISS. Each Crew Dragon capsule is equipped with a launch escape system consisting of eight of SpaceX's SuperDraco engines, which provide 71,000 newtons (16,000 pounds-force) of thrust each. These engines were originally intended to also perform a propulsive landing upon return to Earth, with the first test vehicle having been equipped for such capabilities, but these plans were ultimately abandoned in favor of a traditional splashdown return near Florida in either the Atlantic Ocean or the Gulf of Mexico. SpaceX's CCtCap contract values each seat on a Crew Dragon flight to be between US$60–67 million on the first six missions, while the face value of each seat has been estimated by NASA's Office of Inspector General (OIG) to be around US$55 million. Per-mission cost for the first contract extension (missions 7, 8, and 9) is $258.7 million ($64.6 million/seat), and per-mission cost for the second contract extension (missions 10 through 14) is $288 million ($72 million/seat).

=== Starliner ===
Boeing's CST-100 Starliner – "CST" an acronym for "Crew Space Transportation" – measures 4.6 meters (15 feet) in diameter and 5.1 meters (17 feet) in height. The crew module of Starliner can be reused for up to ten flights, while the service module is expended during each flight. Various engines manufactured by Aerojet Rocketdyne for orbital maneuvering, attitude control, reaction control, and launch escape, are utilized by Starliner. Eight reaction control engines on the spacecraft's crew module and 28 reaction control engines on the spacecraft's service module provide 380 newtons (85 pounds-force) and 445 newtons (100 pounds-force) each, respectively. Also located on the service module, 20 custom-made Orbital Maneuvering and Attitude Control (OMAC) engines provide 6,700 newtons (1,500 pounds-force) of thrust each, while four RS-88 engines provide 178,000 newtons (40,000 pounds-force) of thrust each in a launch abort scenario. During a nominal flight without a launch abort, Starliner can use unspent fuel reserved for its RS-88 engines to help its OMAC engines perform the orbital insertion burn, following separation from the Centaur upper stage during launch. Once in space, Starliner spacecraft can survive up to 60 hours in free flight. Unlike Crew Dragon, Starliner is designed to return to Earth on land instead of ocean, using airbags to cushion the vehicle's impact with the ground. Four sites in the western contiguous United States – the Dugway Proving Ground in Utah, Edwards Air Force Base in California, White Sands Missile Range in New Mexico, and Willcox Playa in Arizona – will serve as landing ranges for returning Starliner spacecraft, though in an emergency scenario, it is also equipped to perform a splashdown return. Boeing's CCtCap contract values each seat on a CST-100 flight to be between US$91–99 million, while the face value of each seat has been estimated by NASA's OIG to be around US$90 million.

== Missions ==
CCP Missions to the ISS are launched on an average every six months. As part of the original contracts Boeing and SpaceX each were initially contracted for up to six operational flights. In 2022, NASA contracted with SpaceX for up to an additional eight flights as a contingency if Starliner is further delayed and to ensure service to the ISS until 2030.

=== Crew Dragon Missions ===
SpaceX's Crew-1 mission, the first operational flight in the program, carried Victor Glover, Mike Hopkins, Soichi Noguchi, and Shannon Walker to the ISS in November 2020 aboard Resilience. Resilience was originally planned to be used for Crew-2, but was reassigned following a scheduling change resulting from the accidental destruction of C204 during testing. While NASA astronauts were given assignments to either Crew Dragon or Starliner flights, Noguchi – a JAXA astronaut – was open for assignment to whichever spacecraft would launch the first operational mission. With Chris Cassidy having arrived at the ISS during Soyuz MS-16, the arrival of the astronauts aboard Resilience marked the first time since the Space Shuttle program in which the US Orbital Segment of the ISS was completely staffed with four crew. Crew-2 launched in April 2021, using a previously-flown Falcon 9 first-stage booster and a refurbished Crew Dragon for the first time. The mission carried Shane Kimbrough, Megan McArthur, Akihiko Hoshide and Thomas Pesquet aboard Endeavour. Crew-3 launched in November 2021, carrying Thomas Marshburn, Raja Chari, Matthias Maurer and Kayla Barron to the ISS, and Crew-4 launched Kjell Lindgren, Bob Hines, Samantha Cristoforetti and Jessica Watkins in April 2022. US astronauts Josh Cassada, Nicole Aunapu Mann and JAXA astronaut Koichi Wakata initially assigned to Starliner crewed flights were reassigned to Crew-5 mission after delays in the Starliner program. The fourth astronaut on Crew-5 is filled by a Russian cosmonaut Anna Kikina and thus becoming to be a part of the Soyuz-Dragon crew swap system, that is, keeping at least one NASA astronaut and one Roscosmos cosmonaut on each of the crew rotation missions. That would ensure both countries would have a presence on the station, and ability to maintain their separate systems, if either Soyuz or commercial crew vehicles are grounded for an extended period.

On 3 December 2021, NASA made clear it would secure up to an additional three flights from SpaceX to maintain an uninterrupted U.S. capability for human access to the space station. The background to this was that SpaceX was likely to launch its sixth flight in early 2023 potentially before Boeing's first operational flight, and NASA concluded that only SpaceX had the capability needed.

NASA and Roscosmos agreed to a seat-swapping agreement initially for three flights each, starting with Crew-5 in 2022. A Russian cosmonaut was to fly on one Crew Dragon flight per year while an American astronaut was to fly on one Soyuz flight per year. This arrangement ensures that ISS will have at least one crew member to operate essential services even if one or the other type of spacecraft is grounded. Starting with Crew-5 a cosmonaut has flown on each CCP Dragon flight and a NASA astronaut has flown on each Soyuz flight. The agreement has been extended to 2027.

On 31 August 2022, NASA awarded SpaceX with an additional 5 flights bringing the total number of contracted Crew Dragon flights to 14. The additional flights will run through 2030.

The Crew-8 and Crew-9 missions were both modified in response to the unexpected need to support the crew of the Starliner Boeing Crew Flight Test (CFT), which visited ISS during the Crew-8 mission. Problems with the Starliner caused NASA to extend its mission and ultimately to bring the spacecraft back to Earth without crew. The Crew-8 mission was extended and its Dragon was fitted with two additional makeshift crew seats to allow it to serve as a "lifeboat" for the CFT crew if evacuation had been needed before Crew-9 arrived. Crew-9 was modified to launch with only two crew members and two empty seats. Its launch was delayed for weeks until Starliner was able to undock from ISS and clear the docking port. When Crew-9 arrived at ISS, the crew of CFT became members of the Crew-9 crew and returned on Crew-9 at the end of its mission.

=== Boeing Starliner Missions ===
As of February 2026, the first operational flight has not been scheduled. The Starliner's inaugural Crewed Flight Test launched on June 5, 2024, had several serious problems including helium leaks during transit, five of the eight reaction control system failing during approach to the ISS, and an RCS oxidizer isolation valve failing to close after docking. Ultimately, NASA decided to re-enter Starliner to Earth without its crew, who instead joined SpaceX Crew-9 when it arrived at ISS in September 2024 and returned with it in March 2025. Due to these problems, Starliner did not receive system certification. NASA continued to evaluate the problems, and in February 2026 announced that the failures constituted a "Type A mishap", the most serious NASA failure classification, typically reserved for missions involving loss of vehicle or life.

NASA and Boeing agreed to modify their contract, and Starliner-1 will fly as an uncrewed cargo mission. If it is successful, Starliner will fly up to three crewed missions.

NASA hopes to extend the seat-swapping arrangement with Roscosmos to include Starliner flights after it has enough flights, which will be no earlier than the Starliner-3 flight.

On May 18, 2026, NASA announced its intent to add six commercial crew missions to the Dragon 2, ordering and formally beginning preparations for the first three. These missions would have been Starliner missions. However, the craft is not yet certified so that SpaceX will launch all NASA missions to the ISS until 2030. It is still possible a crewed Starliner mission to the ISS takes place, as some US Congressmen have called for its retirement to be pushed to 2032.

=== Operational CCP missions ===
Mission	Patch	Launch date	Launch vehicle (Note: Falcon 9 first-stage boosters have a four-digit serial number. A decimal point followed by a number indicates the flight count. For example, B1061.1 and B1061.2 represent the first and second flights of booster B1061.)	Spacecraft (Note: A decimal point followed by a number indicates the flight count. For example, C207.1 and C207.2 represent the first and second flights of Dragon C207, Crew Dragon Resilience.)	Duration	Crew
SpaceX Crew-1; Expedition 64/65	Mission insignia for SpaceX Crew-1	16 November 2020	Falcon 9 Block 5 (B1061.1)	Crew Dragon (C207.1 Resilience)	167d, 6h, 29m	(United States) Michael Hopkins; (United States) Victor Glover; (Japan) Soichi Noguchi; (United States) Shannon Walker
SpaceX Crew-2; Expedition 65/66	Mission insignia for SpaceX Crew-2	23 April 2021	Falcon 9 Block 5 (B1061.2)	Crew Dragon (C206.2 Endeavour)	199d, 17h, 44m	(United States) Shane Kimbrough; (United States) Megan McArthur; (Japan) Akihiko Hoshide; (France) Thomas Pesquet
SpaceX Crew-3; Expedition 66/67	Mission insignia for SpaceX Crew-3	11 November 2021	Falcon 9 Block 5 (B1067.2)	Crew Dragon (C210.1 Endurance)	176d, 2h, 39m	(United States) Raja Chari; (United States) Thomas Marshburn; (United States) Kayla Barron; (Germany) Matthias Maurer
SpaceX Crew-4; Expedition 67/68	Mission insignia for SpaceX Crew-4	27 April 2022	Falcon 9 Block 5 (B1067.4)	Crew Dragon (C212.1 Freedom)	170d, 13h, 2m	(United States) Kjell Lindgren; (United States) Bob Hines; (Italy) Samantha Cristoforetti; (United States) Jessica Watkins
SpaceX Crew-5; Expedition 68	Mission insignia for SpaceX Crew-5	5 October 2022	Falcon 9 Block 5 (B1077.1)	Crew Dragon (C210.2 Endurance)	157d, 10h, 1m	(United States) Nicole Aunapu Mann; (United States) Josh Cassada; (Japan) Koichi Wakata; (Russia) Anna Kikina
SpaceX Crew-6; Expedition 68/69	Mission insignia for SpaceX Crew-6	2 March 2023	Falcon 9 Block 5 (B1078.1)	Crew Dragon (C206.4 Endeavour)	185d, 22h, 43m	(United States) Stephen Bowen; (United States) Warren Hoburg; (United Arab Emirates) Sultan Al Neyadi; (Russia) Andrey Fedyaev
SpaceX Crew-7; Expedition 69/70	Mission insignia for SpaceX Crew-7	26 August 2023	Falcon 9 Block 5 (B1081.1)	Crew Dragon (C210.3 Endurance)	199d, 2h, 19m	(United States) Jasmin Moghbeli; (Denmark) Andreas Mogensen; (Japan) Satoshi Furukawa; (Russia) Konstantin Borisov
SpaceX Crew-8; Expedition 70/71/72	Mission insignia for SpaceX Crew-8	4 March 2024	Falcon 9 Block 5 (B1083.1)	Crew Dragon (C206.5 Endeavour)	235d, 3h, 35m	(United States) Matthew Dominick; (United States) Michael Barratt; (United States) Jeanette Epps; (Russia) Alexander Grebenkin
SpaceX Crew-9; Expedition 72	Mission insignia for SpaceX Crew-9	28 September 2024	Falcon 9 Block 5 (B1085.2)	Crew Dragon (C212.4 Freedom)	171d, 4h, 39m	(United States) Nick Hague; (Russia) Aleksandr Gorbunov; (United States) Barry E. Wilmore (landing); (United States) Sunita Williams (landing)
SpaceX Crew-10; Expedition 72/73	Mission insignia for SpaceX Crew-10	14 March 2025	Falcon 9 Block 5 (B1090.2)	Crew Dragon (C210.4 Endurance)	147d 16h 29m	(United States) Anne McClain; (United States) Nichole Ayers; (Japan) Takuya Onishi; (Russia) Kirill Peskov
SpaceX Crew-11; Expedition 73/74	Mission insignia for SpaceX Crew-11	1 August 2025	Falcon 9 Block 5 (B1094.3)	Crew Dragon (C206.6 Endeavour)	166d 16h 57m	(United States) Zena Cardman; (United States) Michael Fincke; (Japan) Kimiya Yui; (Russia) Oleg Platonov
SpaceX Crew-12; Expedition 74/75	Mission insignia for SpaceX Crew-12	13 February 2026	Falcon 9 Block 5 (B1101.2)	Crew Dragon (C212.5 Freedom)	237d 5h 18m	(United States) Jessica Meir; (United States) Jack Hathaway; (France) Sophie Adenot; (Russia) Andrey Fedyaev
SpaceX Crew-13; Expedition 75	Mission insignia for SpaceX Crew-13	1 October 2026	Falcon 9 Block 5 (B1101.3)	Crew Dragon (C213.2 Grace)	Docked at ISS	(United States) Jessica Watkins; (United States) Luke Delaney; (Canada) Joshua Kutryk; (Russia) Sergey Teteryatnikov
SpaceX Crew-14; Expedition 75/76	Mission insignia for SpaceX Crew-14	NET 1 March 2027	Falcon 9 Block 5	Crew Dragon	Planned	(United States) Kayla Barron; (United States) Christina Birch; (Japan) Makoto Suwa; (Russia) Harutyun Kiviryan

==== Timeline ====
The CCP spacecraft missions usually overlap with brief intervals during which two are docked at the same time. Crew-2 did not overlap with Crew-3 because of an unexpected delay of the Crew-3 launch. Crew-11 returned before Crew-12 arrival due to a Crew-11 medical issue.

== See also ==
- Artemis program
- List of Falcon 9 and Falcon Heavy launches
- List of human spaceflights to the International Space Station
- List of Atlas launches (2020–2029)
