= List of crew of the International Space Station =

This is a list of crew to the International Space Station, in alphabetical order. Current ISS crew names are in bold. The suffix (twice, thrice, ...) refers to the individual's number of spaceflights to the ISS, not the total number of spaceflights. Entries are noted with for women and for men.

This list only includes crew members of the ISS. For a list including non-crew, see List of visitors to the International Space Station.

== Statistics ==
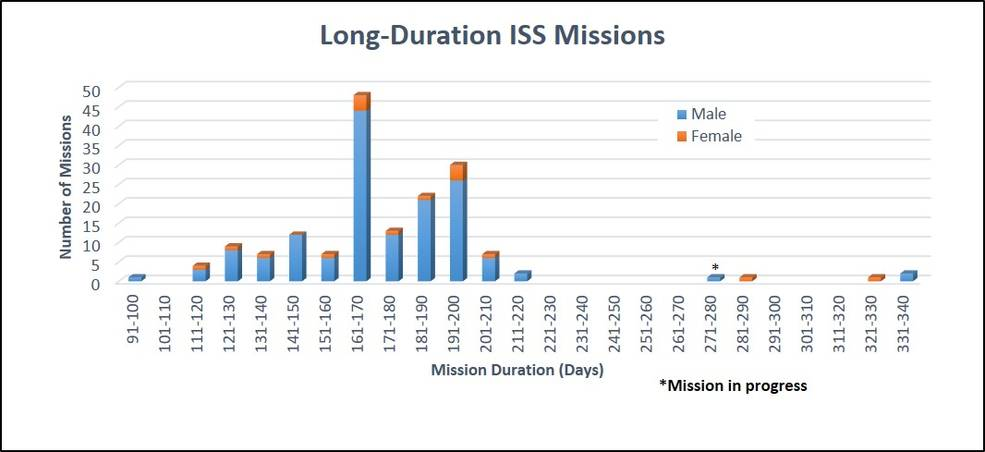
Chart of the number of ISS missions longer than 90 days, until 2020

As of September 2026.

=== By nationality ===
Nationality	ISS Crew	On-board
United States	75	3
Russia	48	3
Japan	6	0
Italy	3	0
Canada	3	0
Germany	3	0
France	3	1
Denmark	1	0
Belgium	1	0
Netherlands	1	0
United Kingdom	1	0
UAE	1	0
**Total**	146	7

=== By agency ===
Agency	ISS Crew	On-board
NASA	75	3
Roscosmos	48	3
ESA	13	1
JAXA	6	0
CSA	3	0
MBRSC	1	0
**Total**	146	7

== A ==
- Joseph M. Acaba (United States) (thrice)
- Sophie Adenot (France)
- Clayton C. Anderson (United States) (twice)
- Oleg Artemyev (Russia) (thrice)
- Nichole Ayers (United States)

== B ==
- Michael R. Barratt (United States) (thrice)
- Kayla Barron (United States)
- Konstantin Borisov (Russia)
- Andrei Borisenko (Russia) (twice)
- Stephen G. Bowen (United States) (four times)
- Kenneth D. Bowersox (United States)
- Randolph J. Bresnik (United States) (twice)
- Nikolai Budarin (Russia)
- Daniel C. Burbank (United States) (thrice)
- Daniel W. Bursch (United States)

== C ==
- Josh A. Cassada (United States)
- Zena Cardman (United States)
- Christopher J. Cassidy (United States) (thrice)
- Gregory E. Chamitoff (United States) (twice)
- Raja Chari (United States)
- Leroy Chiao (United States) (twice)
- Nikolai Chub (Russia)
- Catherine G. Coleman (United States)
- Timothy J. Creamer (United States)
- Samantha Cristoforetti (Italy) (twice)
- Frank L. Culbertson (United States)

== D ==
- Frank De Winne (Belgium) (twice)
- Vladimir Dezhurov (Russia)
- Matthew Dominick (United States)
- **Pyotr Dubrov** (Russia) (twice)
- **Luke Delaney** (United States)
- Tracy E. Caldwell-Dyson (United States) (three times)

== E ==
- Léopold Eyharts (France)
- Jeanette Epps (United States)

== F ==
- Andrey Fedyaev (Russia) (twice)
- Michael Fincke (United States) (four times)
- Jack D. Fischer (United States)
- Michael Foale (United Kingdom) / (United States)
- Kevin A. Ford (United States) (twice)
- Michael E. Fossum (United States) (thrice)
- Satoshi Furukawa (Japan) (twice)

== G ==
- Ronald J. Garan (United States) (twice)
- Alexander Gerst (Germany) (twice)
- Yuri Gidzenko (Russia) (twice)
- Victor Glover (United States)
- Alexander Grebenkin (Russia)
- Aleksandr Gorbunov (Russia)

== H ==
- Chris A. Hadfield (Canada) (twice)
- Nick Hague (United States) (twice)
- Susan J. Helms (United States) (twice)
- Jack Hathaway (United States)
- Robert Hines (United States)
- Warren Hoburg (United States)
- Michael S. Hopkins (United States) (twice)
- Akihiko Hoshide (Japan) (thrice)

== I ==
- Anatoli Ivanishin (Russia) (thrice)

== K ==
- Aleksandr Kaleri (Russia) (twice)
- Scott J. Kelly (United States) (thrice)
- **Anna Kikina** (Russia) (twice)
- Jonny Kim (United States)
- Shane Kimbrough (United States) (thrice)
- Christina Koch (United States)
- Dmitri Kondratyev (Russia)
- Oleg Kononenko (Russia) (five times)
- Timothy L. Kopra (United States) (twice)
- Mikhail Korniyenko (Russia) (twice)
- Sergey Korsakov (Russia)
- Valery Korzun (Russia)
- Oleg Kotov (Russia) (thrice)
- Sergei Krikalev (Russia) (thrice)
- Sergey Kud-Sverchkov (Russia) (twice)
- André Kuipers (Netherlands) (twice)
- **Joshua Kutryk** (Canada)

== L ==
- Kjell Lindgren (United States)
- Yuri Lonchakov (Russia) (thrice)
- Michael E. Lopez-Alegria (United States) (five times)
- Edward T. Lu (United States) (twice)

== M ==
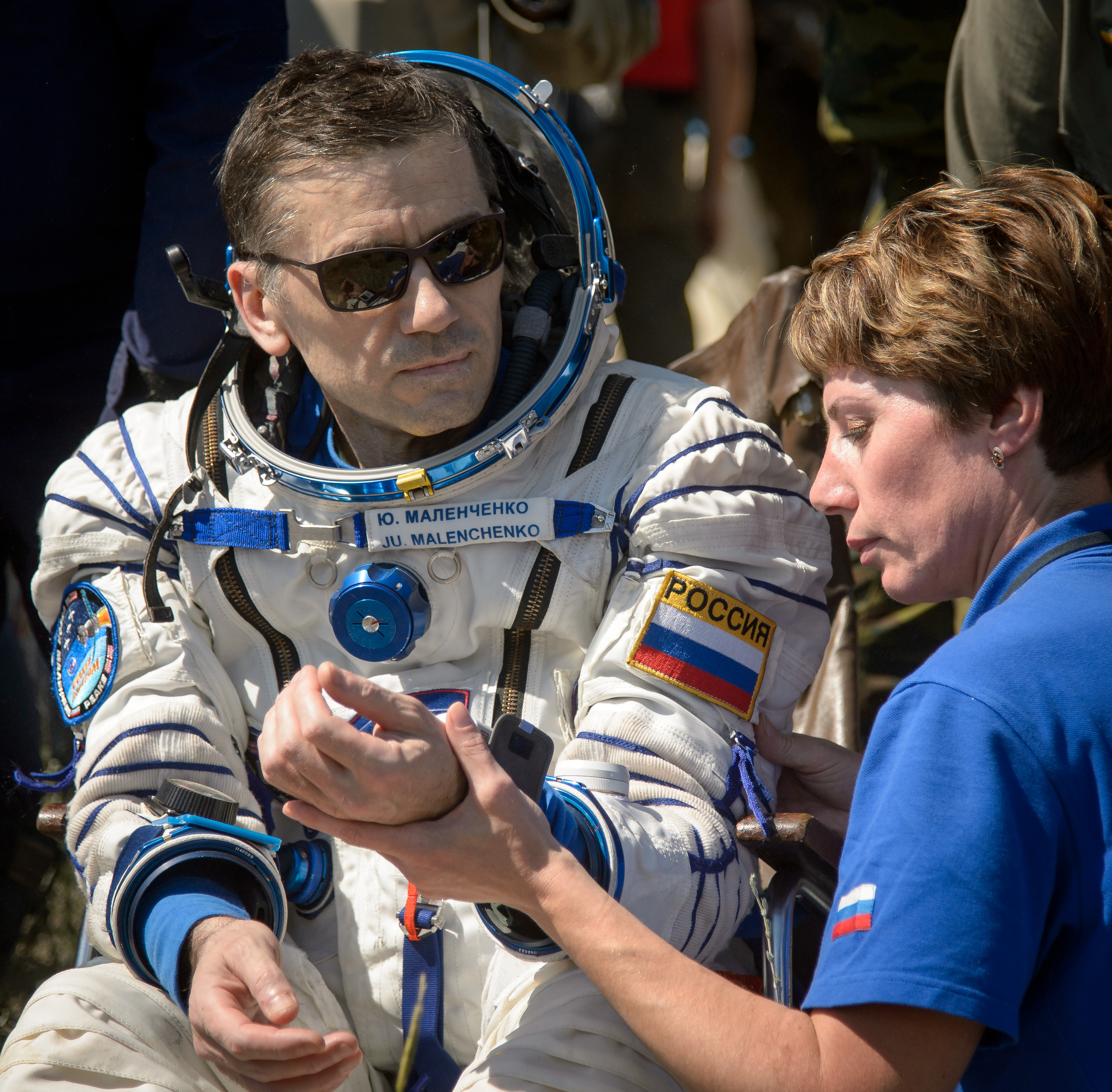
Yuri Malenchenko has been to the ISS five times, which is more than anyone else. He is shown here in 2016, after returning to Earth from Expedition 47.

- Sandra H. Magnus (United States) (thrice)
- Yuri Malenchenko (Russia) (five times)
- Nicole Aunapu Mann (United States)
- Denis Matveev (Russia)
- Thomas H. Marshburn (United States) (thrice)
- Richard A. Mastracchio (United States) (four times)
- Matthias Maurer (Germany)
- K. Megan McArthur (United States)
- William S. McArthur (United States) (twice)
- Anne McClain (United States) (twice)
- Jessica Meir (United States) (twice)
- **Anil Menon** (United States)
- Sergei Mikayev (Russia)
- Aleksandr Misurkin (Russia)
- Andreas Mogensen (Denmark) (twice)
- Jasmin Moghbeli (United States)

== N ==
- Paolo Nespoli (Italy) (thrice)
- Sultan Al Neyadi (United Arab Emirates)
- Soichi Noguchi (Japan) (thrice)
- Oleg Novitskiy (Russia) (four times)
- Karen L. Nyberg (United States) (twice)

== O ==
- Loral O'Hara (United States)
- Takuya Onishi (Japan) (twice)
- Yuri Onufrienko (Russia)
- Aleksey Ovchinin (Russia) (three times)

== P ==
- Gennady Padalka (Russia) (four times)
- Luca Parmitano (Italy) (twice)
- Timothy Peake (United Kingdom)
- Dmitry Petelin (Russia)
- Thomas Pesquet (France) (twice)
- Kirill Peskov (Russia)
- Donald R. Pettit (United States) (four times)
- John L. Phillips (United States) (three times)
- Oleg Platonov (Russia)
- Sergey Prokopyev (Russia) (twice)

== R ==
- Garrett E. Reisman (United States) (twice)
- Thomas Reiter (Germany)
- Sergei Revin (Russia)
- Roman Romanenko (Russia) (twice)
- Kathleen Rubins (United States) (twice)
- Francisco Rubio (United States)
- Sergey Ryazansky (Russia) (twice)
- Sergey Ryzhikov (three times) (Russia)

== S ==
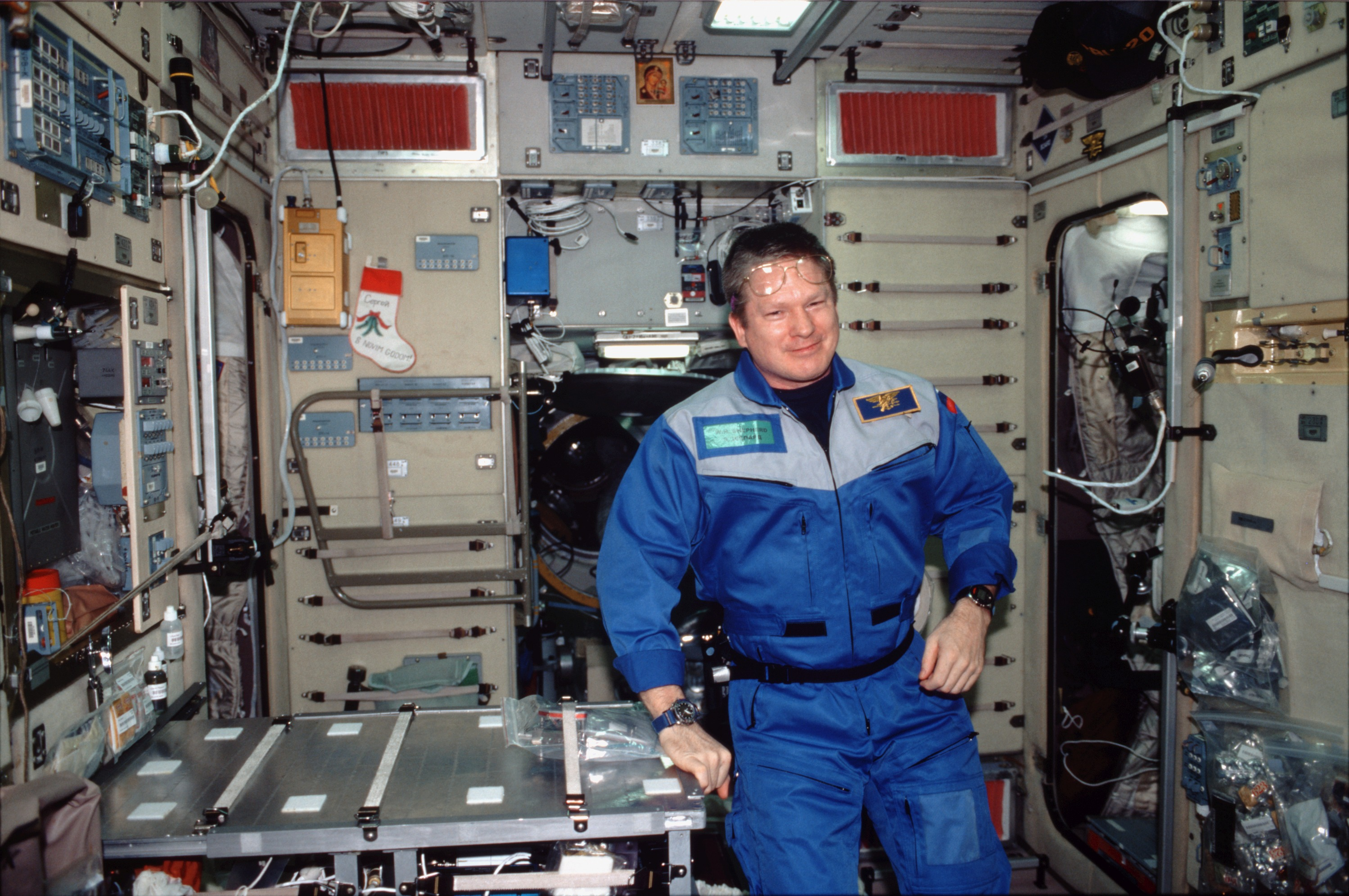
Bill Shepherd, shown here aboard the ISS in 2001, was the commander of Expedition 1 which was the first long-duration human stay at the ISS.

- David Saint-Jacques (Canada)
- Aleksandr Samokutyayev (Russia) (twice)
- Yelena Serova (Russia)
- Salizhan Sharipov (Russia)
- William M. Shepherd (United States)
- Anton Shkaplerov (Russia) (four times)
- Oleg Skripochka (Russia) (thrice)
- Aleksandr Skvortsov (Russia) (thrice)
- Nicole P. Stott (United States) (twice)
- Maksim Surayev (Russia) (twice)
- Steven R. Swanson (United States) (thrice)

== T ==
- Daniel M. Tani (United States) (twice)
- Evgeny Tarelkin (Russia)
- **Sergey Teteryatnikov** (Russia)
- Robert Thirsk (Canada)
- Scott Tingle (United States)
- Valery Tokarev (Russia)
- Sergei Treshchev (Russia)
- Mikhail Tyurin (Russia) (thrice)

== U ==
- Yury Usachev (Russia) (twice)

== V ==
- Ivan Vagner (Russia) (twice)
- Mark T. Vande Hei (United States) (twice)
- Pavel Vinogradov (Russia) (twice)
- Terry W. Virts (United States) (twice)
- Sergey Volkov (Russia) (thrice)
- James S. Voss (United States) (twice)

== W ==
- Koichi Wakata (Japan) (four times)
- Shannon Walker (United States) (twice)
- Carl E. Walz (United States)
- **Jessica Watkins** (United States) (twice)
- Douglas H. Wheelock (United States) (twice)
- Peggy A. Whitson (United States) (five time)
- Christopher Williams (United States)
- Jeffrey N. Williams (United States) (four times)
- Sunita L. Williams (United States) (three times)
- Barry E. Wilmore (United States) (twice)
- Reid Wiseman (United States)

== Y ==
- Kimiya Yui (Japan) (twice)
- Fyodor Yurchikhin (Russia) (five times)

== Z ==
- Alexey Zubritsky (Russia)
