= Crew Dragon Grace =

SpaceX Crew Dragon spacecraft

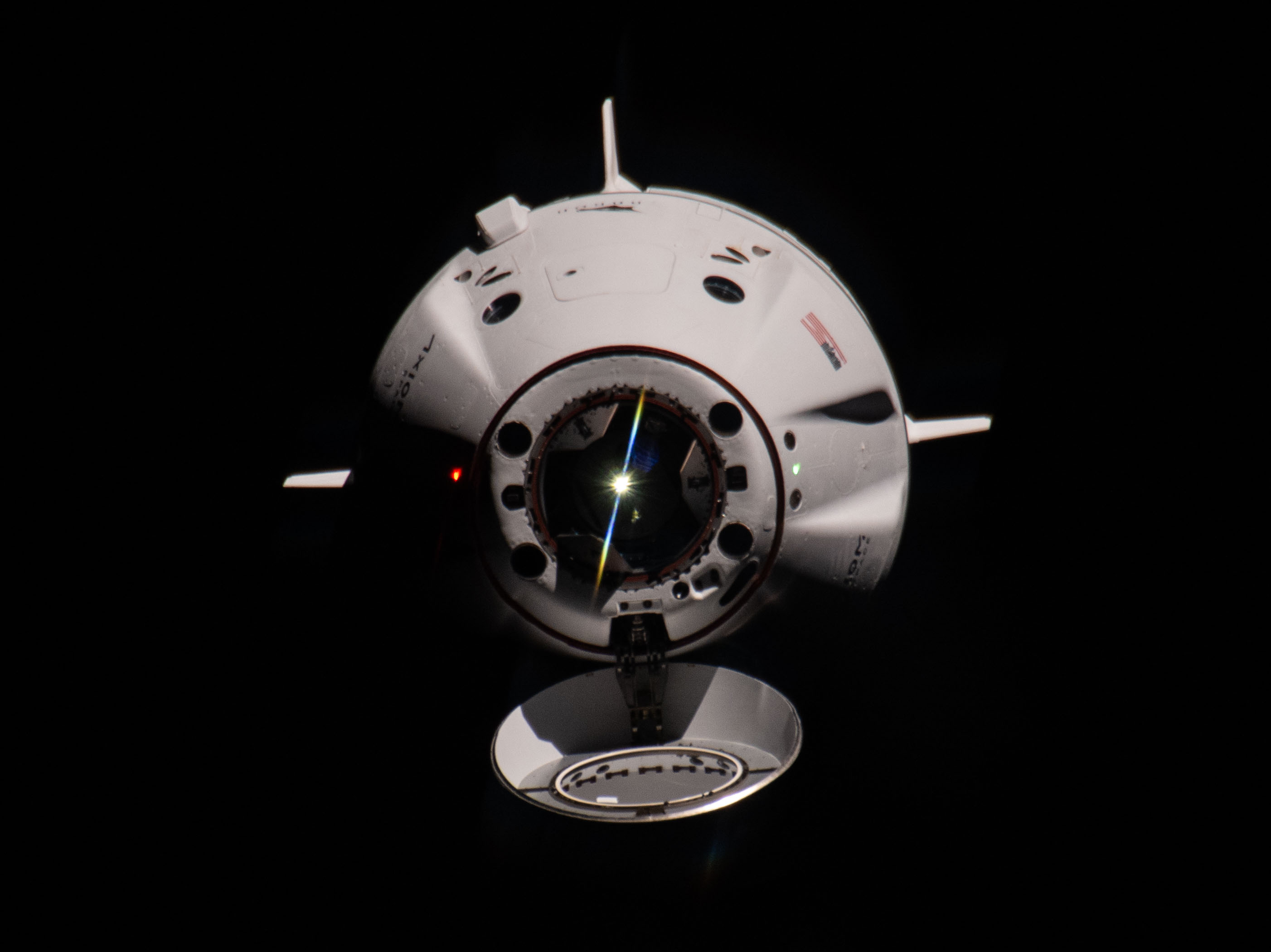
- Crew Dragon Grace approaches the ISS, June 2025
- Type: Space capsule
- Class: Dragon 2
- Eponym: Grace
- Serial no.: C213
- Owner: SpaceX
- Manufacturer: SpaceX

Specifications
- Dimensions: 4.4 m × 3.7 m (14 ft × 12 ft)
- Power: Solar panel
- Rocket: Falcon 9 Block 5

History
- Location: International Space Station
- First flight: 25 June–15 July 2025; Axiom-4
- Last flight: 1 October 2026–present; Crew-13
- Flights: 2
- Flight time: 26 days, 1 hour, 7 minutes (currently in space)

Dragon 2s

Crew Dragon Grace (serial number C213) is the fifth and final Dragon 2 based Crew Dragon reusable spacecraft manufactured and operated by SpaceX. It made its maiden flight to the International Space Station (ISS) on Axiom Mission 4.

== History ==
Crew Dragon C213 is the fifth and final Crew Dragon spacecraft as SpaceX seeks to phase out the craft in favor of Starship. It made its maiden flight in mid 2025 to the International Space Station (ISS) on Axiom Mission 4. The Ax-4 inaugural flight astronauts christened their Dragon 2 with the name "Grace".

== Flights ==
List includes only completed or currently manifested missions. Dates are listed in UTC, and for future events, they are the earliest possible opportunities (also known as NET dates) and may change.

| Flight No. | Mission and Patch | Launch | Landing | Duration | Remarks | Crew | Outcome |
|---|---|---|---|---|---|---|---|
| 1 | Axiom-4 (patch 1, 2, and 3) | 25 June 2025, 06:31:53 | 15 July 2025, 09:31:41 | 20 days, 2 hours, 59 minutes | Short-duration mission. | Peggy Whitson (Note: Axiom Space employee); Shubhanshu Shukla; Sławosz Uznański-Wiśniewski; Tibor Kapu | Success |
| 2 | Crew-13 | 1 October 2026, 15:10:06 | March 2027 (planned) | 5 days, 22 hours, 8 minutes | Long-duration mission. Ferried four Expedition 75 crew members to the ISS. Fastest Crew Dragon rendezvous to date. | Jessica Watkins; Luke Delaney; Joshua Kutryk; Sergey Teteryatnikov | In progress |
