= Joshua Kutryk =

Canadian astronaut (born 1982)

Joshua Kutryk CD
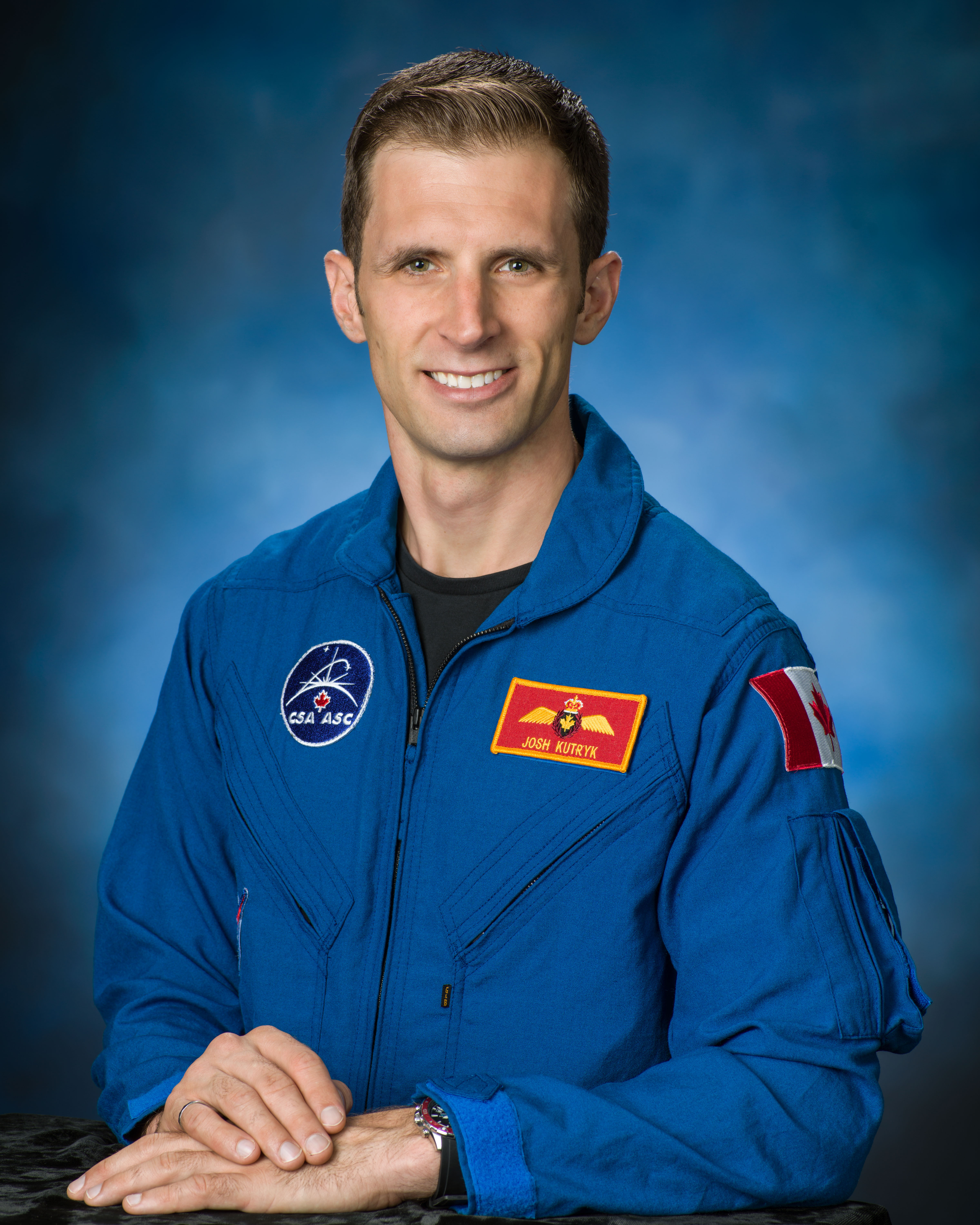
- Kutryk in 2017
- Born: March 21, 1982 (age 44); Fort Saskatchewan, Alberta, Canada
- Education: Royal Military College of Canada (BSc, MSc); Embry-Riddle Aeronautical University (MSc); Air University (MSc)
- Awards: Canadian Forces' Decoration (2012)
- Space career

CSA astronaut
- Time in space: 52 days, 5 hours, 37 minutes (currently in space)
- Selection: 2017 CSA Group; NASA Group 22 (2017)
- Total EVAs: 2
- Total EVA time: 14 hours, 10 minutes
- Mission: SpaceX Crew-13 (Expedition 75/76)
- Military career
- Allegiance: Canada
- Branch: Royal Canadian Air Force
- Service years: 2007–present
- Rank: Colonel
- Conflicts: War in Afghanistan

Joshua Kutryk CD (born March 21, 1982) is a Canadian astronaut, test pilot, fighter pilot and engineer. He was selected by the Canadian Space Agency (CSA) as one of the two members of the 2017 CSA Astronaut Group, along with Jenni Gibbons. They both graduated from NASA's astronaut training program in 2020 and were assigned flights in 2023. Kutryk was originally set to fly on the first operational commercial flight of the Boeing CST-100 Starliner. Because of continued issues and delays with that spacecraft, NASA arranged for him to be a member of the SpaceX Crew-13 mission. It launched and docked to the International Space Station (ISS) on October 1, 2026. He is now part of the Expedition 75/76 crew on the ISS. Kutryk will likely be the last Canadian astronaut to fly a long-duration mission aboard the ISS as it will be decommissioned around 2030.

== Early life and education ==
Joshua Kutryk was born on March 21, 1982, in Fort Saskatchewan, Alberta. His family moved frequently, living in Fort Saskatchewan, Elk Point and Whitehorse before his father retired from a career in the Royal Canadian Mounted Police, at which time the family moved to a cattle farm near Beauvallon, Alberta. He attended St. John XXIII Catholic School. His family emigrated to Canada from Ukraine in 1910.

He graduated from the Royal Military College of Canada in 2004 with a bachelor's degree in mechanical engineering. He subsequently completed a master's degree in space studies at Embry-Riddle Aeronautical University in 2009, a master's degree in flight test engineering at the Air University in 2012, and a master's degree in defence studies at the Royal Military College of Canada in 2014.

As a test-pilot trainee, Kutryk became a distinguished graduate of the United States Air Force Test Pilot School at Edwards Air Force Base, California. In 2012, he received the Liethen-Title Award for the top test pilot graduate from that school. This award was also conferred to his fellow astronaut Chris Hadfield in 1988.

== RCAF Career ==
Kutryk served in the Royal Canadian Air Force (RCAF) as a CF-188 pilot based in Bagotville, Quebec from 2007 to 2011. During that time, the RCAF deployed him on combat missions to both Libya and Afghanistan.

Prior to joining the Canadian Space Agency (CSA), Kutryk was an experimental test pilot for the (RCAF) in Cold Lake, Alberta. At the Aerospace Engineering Test Establishment, based in Cold Lake, he led the unit responsible for flight-testing of fighter aircraft in Canada. Kutryk was most notably responsible for the testing of new aircraft technologies on the CF-188 fighter jet. He has accumulated over 4000 hours of flying experience across more than 40 types of aircraft. He holds the RCAF rank of lieutenant colonel.

== Astronaut career ==
=== CSA selection and training ===
Kutryk had previously applied to become an astronaut in the 2009 CSA selection, where astronauts David Saint-Jacques and Jeremy Hansen were selected. Kutryk was shortlisted to undergo a year-long testing program and ultimately found himself in the top 16 finalists of some 5,350 candidates. His perseverance in successfully applying again in 2017 is highlighted on the CSA website.

During the fourth Canadian astronaut recruitment campaign the Canadian Space Agency selected him to undergo astronaut training as part of the 2017 CSA Group. He and Dr. Jenni Sidey were selected from an initial pool of 3,772 candidates.

In July 2017, Kutryk relocated to Houston, Texas to start the two-year NASA Astronaut Candidate Training Program at the Johnson Space Center. He is a member of the 2017 NASA astronaut class. Both he and Dr. Sidey graduated from that program in January 2020.

In September 2019, Kutryk participated as a cavenaut in training organized by the European Space Agency with Italy and Slovenia.

=== Starliner-1 crew member ===
Canada announced its first Commercial Crew mission on November 22, 2023, and Kutryk was on it. The six-month mission to the International Space Station (ISS) planned to use a Boeing CST-100 Starliner spacecraft to get them there and return to Earth. The Boeing Starliner-1 mission was originally intended to be that spacecraft's first operational crewed mission to the ISS. However, the 2024 Boeing Crew Flight Test (CFT) encountered what NASA later described as a Type A mishap. That is NASA's most severe mishap category, which means a crew could have been lost, and almost was. With the Starliner program grounded until at least late 2026, NASA decided to switch the Starliner-1 mission from a crew to a cargo one in November 2025. This also left its crew in limbo on whether they would fly on Starliner or be reassigned to a SpaceX Crew Dragon mission.

=== SpaceX Crew-13 ===
(May 5, 2026) — NASA astronaut Jessica Watkins (left) assists CSA (Canadian Space Agency) astronaut Joshua Kutryk (background) and NASA astronaut Luke Delaney (right) as they practice suiting up in spacesuits in an International Space Station airlock simulator at Johnson Space Center’s (JSC) Space Vehicle Mockup Facility in Houston, Texas. Astronauts familiarize themselves with spacesuit systems and procedures and practice Quest Joint Airlock operations before conducting spacewalk training at JSC’s Neutral Buoyancy Laboratory in simulated microgravity. Credit: NASA/Josh Valcarcel

On April 23, 2026, NASA announced that Kutryk will fly to the ISS aboard the SpaceX Crew-13 mission, launching no earlier than September 2026. The mission's September launch date was delayed a few weeks due to a thruster issue with the Crew Dragon. The mission was expected to launch no earlier than October 1, 2026 from Cape Canaveral Space Force Station's Space Launch Complex 40 (SLC-40). NASA plans for the Crew-13 astronauts to stay for six months on the ISS, and they will carry out Canadian sponsored science experiments as part of the station's Expedition 75/76 missions. Kutryk could be the last Canadian to make an extended stay on the ISS as current plans are for the station to be de-orbited sometime after 2030.

==== Launch ====
Crew-13 went into quarantine at the Johnson Space Center on September 17, 2026 about two weeks before the launch. The crew flew to Cape Canaveral Space Force Station on September 26 with Kutryk piloting one of the two T-38 jet aircraft used to transport the astronauts. His passenger was the mission commander Jessica Watkins. The crew remained in quarantine until a few hours before the launch at the Astronaut Crew Quarters inside the Kennedy Space Center’s Neil A. Armstrong Operations and Checkout Building.

Launch arrived on October 1, 2026, with the astronauts leaving the Operations and Checkout Building for Space Launch Complex 40. The SpaceX Crew Dragon Grace departed the pad at 11:10 a.m., Eastern Daylight Time (15:10 UTC), an on time launch. The Dragon spacecraft docked with the ISS seven hours and fifty-five minutes after launch, a record for a NASA crewed spacecraft going to the station.
