= SpaceX Crew-13 =

2026 American crewed spaceflight to the ISS

- Launch of Crew-13
- Names: USCV-13
- Mission type: ISS crew transport
- Operator: SpaceX
- COSPAR ID: 2026-226A
- SATCAT no.: 100882
- Mission duration: 44 days, 12 hours and 38 minutes (in progress)

Spacecraft properties
- Spacecraft: Crew Dragon Grace
- Spacecraft type: Crew Dragon
- Manufacturer: SpaceX

Crew
- Crew size: 4
- Members: Jessica Watkins; Luke Delaney; Joshua Kutryk; Sergey Teteryatnikov
- Expedition: Expedition 75

Start of mission
- Launch date: 1 October 2026 15:10:06 UTC (11:10:06 am EDT)
- Rocket: Falcon 9 Block 5 (B1101.3), Flight 691
- Launch site: Cape Canaveral, SLC‑40

End of mission
- Landing date: NET March 2027 (planned)
- Landing site: Pacific Ocean (planned)

Orbital parameters
- Reference system: Geocentric orbit
- Regime: Low Earth orbit
- Inclination: 51.63°

Docking with ISS
- Docking port: Harmony forward
- Docking date: 1 October 2026 23:05:16 UTC (7:05:16 pm EDT)
- Undocking date: March 2027 (planned)
- Time docked: 44 days, 4 hours and 43 minutes (in progress)
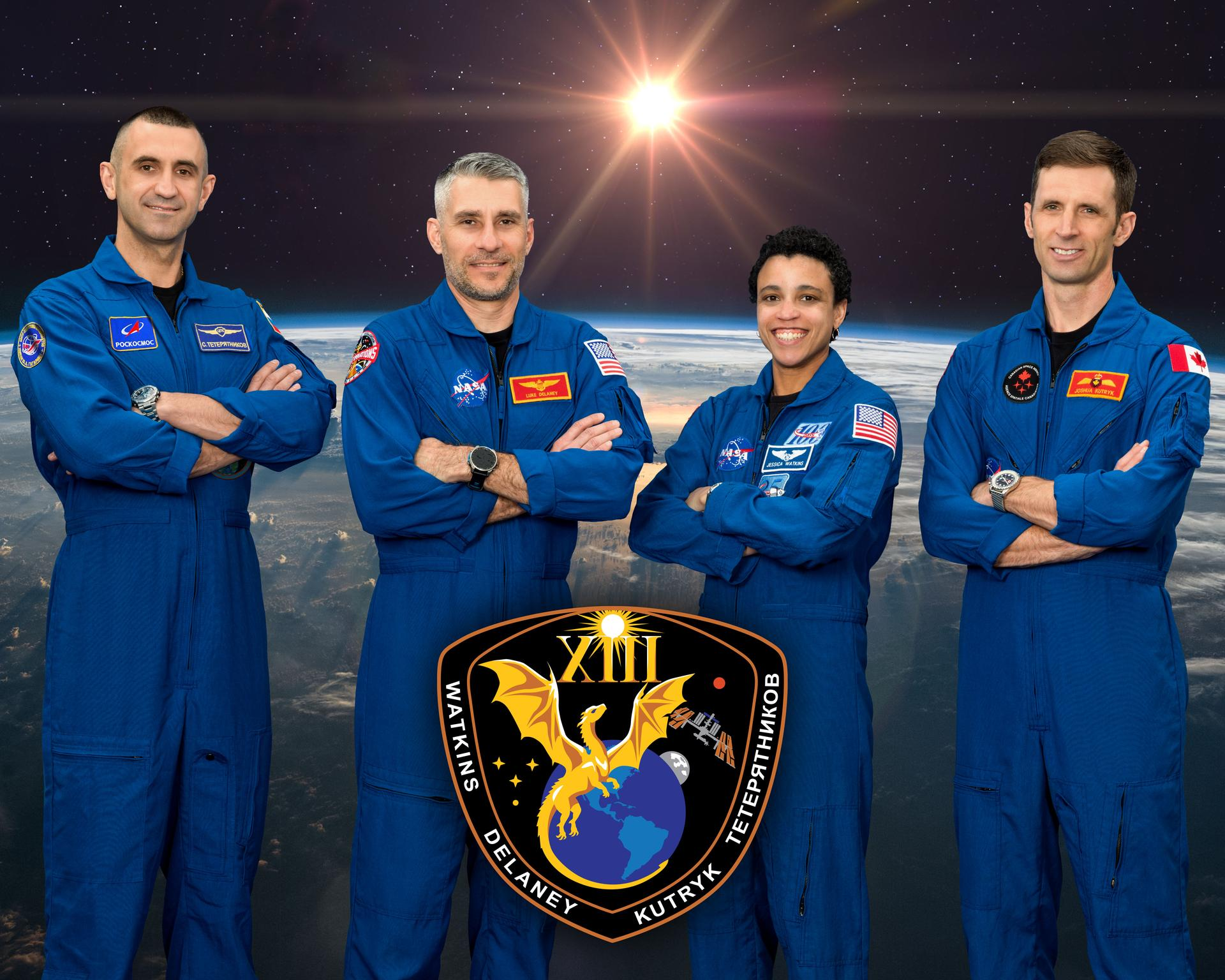
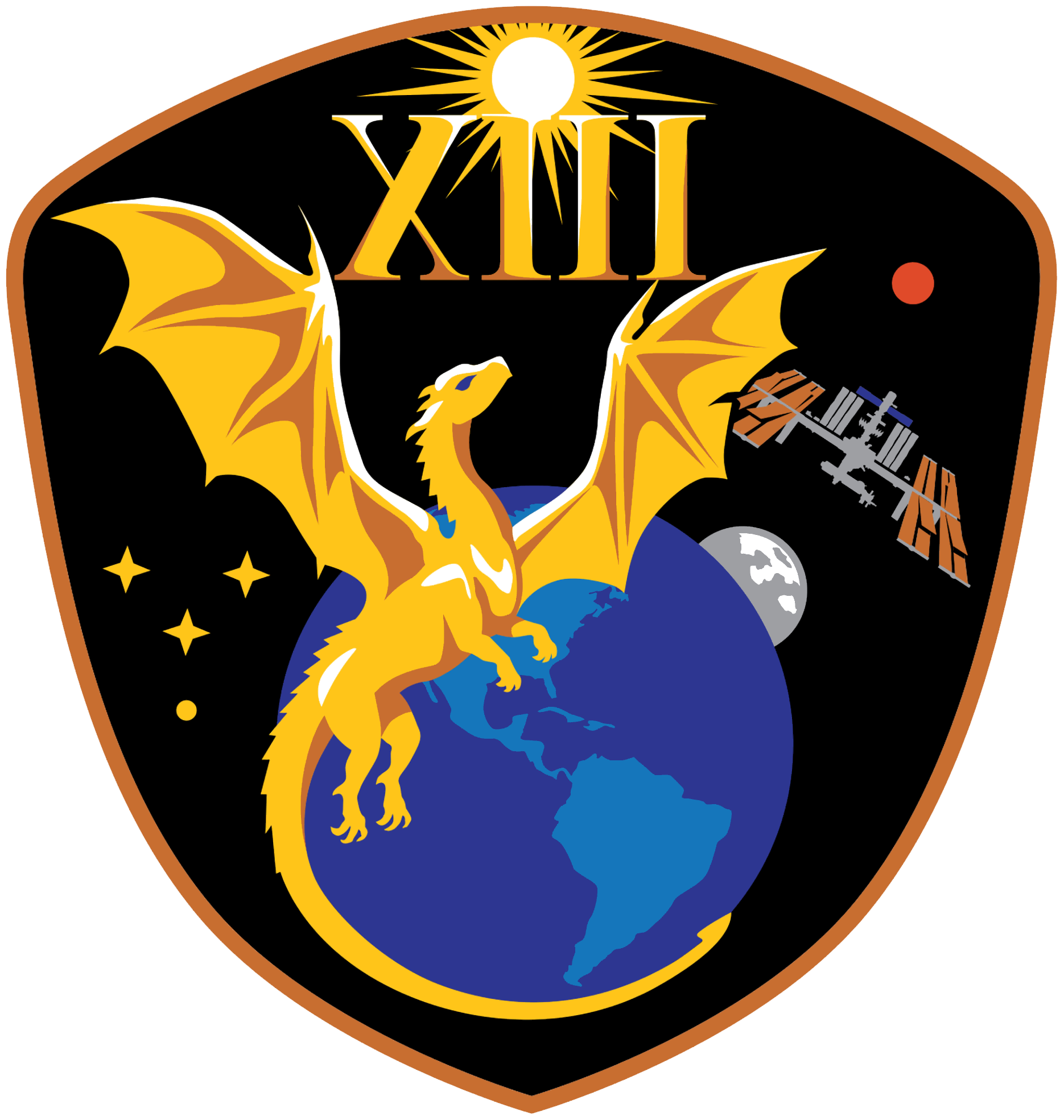
- NASA (left), SpaceX (middle), and CSA (right) mission patches From left to right: Teteryatnikov, Delaney, Watkins, and Kutryk Commercial Crew Program Crew Dragon flights

SpaceX Crew-13 is the thirteenth operational NASA Commercial Crew Program flight and the 21st crewed orbital flight of a Crew Dragon spacecraft. The mission launched October 1, 2026 at 11:10:06 am to transport four crew members—NASA astronauts Jessica Watkins and Luke Delaney, CSA astronaut Joshua Kutryk, and Roscosmos cosmonaut Sergey Teteryatnikov—to the International Space Station (ISS).

== Crew ==
Prime crew
Position	Crew
Commander	Jessica Watkins, NASA; Expedition 75; Second spaceflight
Pilot	Luke Delaney, NASA; Expedition 75; First spaceflight
Mission specialist	Joshua Kutryk, CSA; Expedition 75; First spaceflight
Mission specialist	Sergey Teteryatnikov, Roscosmos; Expedition 75; First spaceflight

Backup crew
Position	Crew
Mission specialist	Harutyun Kiviryan, Roscosmos

NASA announced the crew assignments for Crew-13 on April 23, 2026 consisting of NASA astronauts Jessica Watkins, a geologist, and Luke Delaney, a former naval aviator, alongside CSA astronaut Joshua Kutryk, a fighter pilot, and Roscosmos cosmonaut Sergey Teteryatnikov, a submariner. Besides Watkins, who flew on SpaceX Crew-4, this will be the first mission to space for the remaining astronauts. Kutryk is the first Canadian to be sent to orbit as part of the Commercial Crew Program. (Note: Mark Pathy travelled to the ISS as part of Axiom Mission 1, being the first Canadian to use a Crew Dragon, however, Pathy was a private Space Tourist.)

== Gallery ==
Crew-13 astronauts arriving at the Kennedy Space Center

Crew-13 astronauts outside the O&C Building

Crew-13 launch

== Mission ==
=== Launch ===
Attempt	Planned	Result	Turnaround	Reason	Decision point	Weather go (%)	Notes
1	12 Sep 2026, 6:34:00 pm	Scrubbed	—	Technical	29 Aug 2026, 9:12 pm	75%	Due to a propellant oxidizer leak.
2	1 Oct 2026, 11:10:06 am	Success	18 days 16 hours 36 minutes			70%	

The 13th operational SpaceX mission under NASA's Commercial Crew Program was scheduled to launch on September 12, 2026, but a leak in Grace's oxidizer tank delayed the launch. After the leak was discovered, Delaney noted that "The numeral significance was not lost on us" and that they are "leveraging th[e] heritage" of Apollo 13. The crew went into a final quarantine starting on September 17 after the scheduled launch slipped to October 1.
