= An Yin =

Earth scientist (1959–2023)

Professor An Yin
- 尹安
- Born: June 24, 1959; Harbin, Heilongjiang, China
- Died: July 12, 2023 (aged 64); Bishop, California, United States
- Education: Peking University (BS); University of Southern California (PhD)
- Known for: Tectonic evolution of the Himalayas and Tibetan Plateau; planetary tectonics
- Children: 2
- Awards: Donath Medal (1994); AGU Fellow (2013); Penrose Medal (2022)
- Scientific career
- Fields: Structural geology; Planetary geology
- Workplaces: University of California, Los Angeles
- Doctoral advisor: Gregory Davis, USC
- Notable students: Jessica Watkins; Paul Kapp; Andrew Zuza

An Yin (June 24, 1959 – July 12, 2023) was a Chinese-American earth scientist and a Distinguished Professor of Geology at the University of California, Los Angeles (UCLA). His early work explores the mechanical origin and kinematic evolution of low-angle normal faults and thrust systems in the North American Cordillera. He is known for his work on the tectonic evolution of the Himalayas and Tibetan Plateau. His research interests shifted in later years to slow-earthquake mechanics, early Earth tectonics, and planetary studies.

== Early life ==
Yin was born in the city of Harbin, in northeastern China. His parents were medical school professors and were sent to the countryside during the Cultural Revolution from 1966 to 1976 in China. Yin spent part of his early life living in a small village with his parents during this time. His experience during the Cultural Revolution profoundly shaped his later life.

== Education ==
After a lack of systematic education in his elementary, middle, and high schools resulting from numerous disruptions in life during the Cultural Revolution, Yin passed the nationwide university examination in China and entered Peking University in 1978. He graduated in 1982 with a B.S. degree in Geomechanics and stayed on for one year in an M.S. program studying Precambrian geology of northern China at Peking University. He came to the United States in 1983 without finishing his M.S. degree in China. From 1983 to 1987, Yin pursued his Ph.D. degree in geology at the University of Southern California (USC).

== Career ==
In 1987, Yin was offered a tenure track acting assistant professor position at UCLA, one year before he officially obtained his doctoral degree from USC. At UCLA, he was appointed assistant professor in 1988, promoted to associate professor in 1993, and in 1996 became a full professor.

== Research ==
Yin's research was focused on studying how mountains are created and destroyed on Earth and other Solar System bodies. His work on Earth was field-based, which starts with making detailed geologic maps and ends with the construction of kinematic and mechanical models of the evolution of Earth's lithosphere. Based on analysis of satellite images and comparison against similar geologic settings from the Earth such as the western Pacific subduction system, Yin proposed a hypothesis that a primitive form of plate tectonics, expressed as local plate boundary processes involving thermal-boundary-layer recycling by impact-induced slab rollback, may have been responsible for the formation of the Tharsis rise on Mars. His proposed primitive plate tectonics differs from the modern plate tectonics on Earth, which operates over the entire planet.

== Honors and community service ==
In 1994, Yin was awarded the Donath Medal from the Geological Society of America (GSA). He became a fellow of the American Geophysical Union in 2013, and in 1994 became a GSA fellow.

Yin was the 2022 recipient of the Penrose Medal from the Geological Society of America.

Yin was an editor-in-chief for Tectonophysics and Earth and Planetary Science Letters.

== Notable students ==
Jessica Watkins, an astronaut selected in the NASA class of 2017, was one of his former Ph.D. students.

Paul A. Kapp, a professor of geology at the University of Arizona and a former PhD student of Yin, was the 2008 recipient of the Donath Medal from the Geological Society of America.

Andrew Zuza, an associate professor at University of Nevada, Reno; a former PhD student of Yin, was the 2023 recipient of the Donath Medal from the Geological Society of America ( GSA ).

== Personal life ==
In 1992, Yin met Sandy, a Chinese American who was born in Hong Kong. They were married in 1997 and had two children, Daniel and Hanah.

Yin died on July 12, 2023, at the age of 64.

== Selected bibliography ==
- Yin A, Harrison TM. Geologic evolution of the Himalayan-Tibetan orogen. Annual review of earth and planetary sciences. 2000 May;28(1):211-80.[2]
- Harrison TM, Copeland P, Kidd WS, Yin AN. Raising Tibet. Science. 1992 Mar 27;255(5052):1663-70. [3]
- Yin A. Cenozoic tectonic evolution of the Himalayan orogen as constrained by along-strike variation of structural geometry, exhumation history, and foreland sedimentation. Earth-Science Reviews. 2006 May 1;76(1–2):1-31.[4]
- Yin A, Nie S. An indentation model for the North and South China collision and the development of the Tan-Lu and Honam fault systems, eastern Asia. Tectonics. 1993 Aug;12(4):801-13. [5]
- Yin A, Rumelhart PE, Butler R, Cowgill E, Harrison TM, Foster DA, Ingersoll RV, Qing Z, Xian-Qiang Z, Xiao-Feng W, Hanson A. Tectonic history of the Altyn Tagh fault system in northern Tibet inferred from Cenozoic sedimentation. Geological Society of America Bulletin. 2002 Oct 1;114(10):1257-95. [6]
- Yin A. Cenozoic tectonic evolution of Asia: A preliminary synthesis. Tectonophysics. 2010 Jun 5;488(1–4):293-325. [7]
- Kapp P, Yin A, Harrison TM, Ding L. Cretaceous-Tertiary shortening, basin development, and volcanism in central Tibet. Geological Society of America Bulletin. 2005 Jul 1;117(7–8):865-78.
- Murphy MA, Yin A, Harrison TM, Durr SB, Ryerson FJ, Kidd WS. Did the Indo-Asian collision alone create the Tibetan plateau?. Geology. 1997 Aug 1;25(8):719-22.
