= Expedition 75 =

Current long-duration mission to the International Space Station

- First-half crew Promotional Poster
- Mission type: Long-duration expedition
- Operator: NASA / Roscosmos
- Mission duration: 117 days, 10 hours and 38 minutes (in progress); 253 days (planned)

Expedition
- Space station: International Space Station
- Began: 26 July 2026
- Ended: 5 April 2027 (planned)
- Arrived aboard: SpaceX Crew-12; Soyuz MS-29; SpaceX Crew-13; Soyuz MS-30
- Departed aboard: SpaceX Crew-12; Soyuz MS-29

Crew
- Crew size: 7–11
- Members: Expedition 74/75: Jessica Meir; Jack Hathaway; Sophie Adenot; Andrey Fedyaev; Pyotr Dubrov; Anna Kikina; Anil Menon; Expedition 75: Jessica Watkins; Luke Delaney; Joshua Kutryk; Sergey Teteryatnikov; Expedition 75/76; Kayla Barron; Christina Birch; Makoto Suwa; Harutyun Kiviryan; Dmitry Petelin; Konstantin Borisov; Deniz Burnham
- EVAs: 6
- EVA duration: 42 hours, 19 minutes
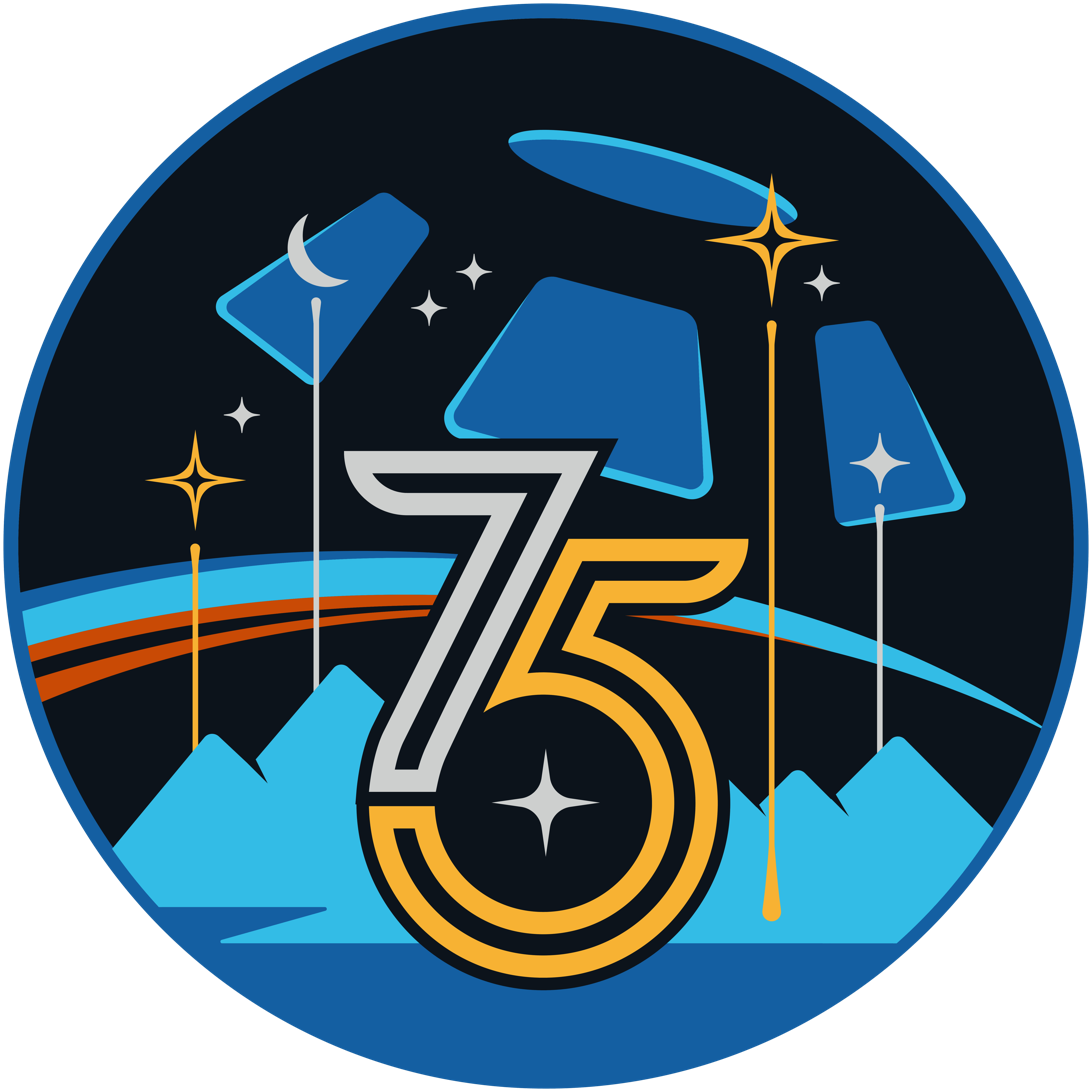
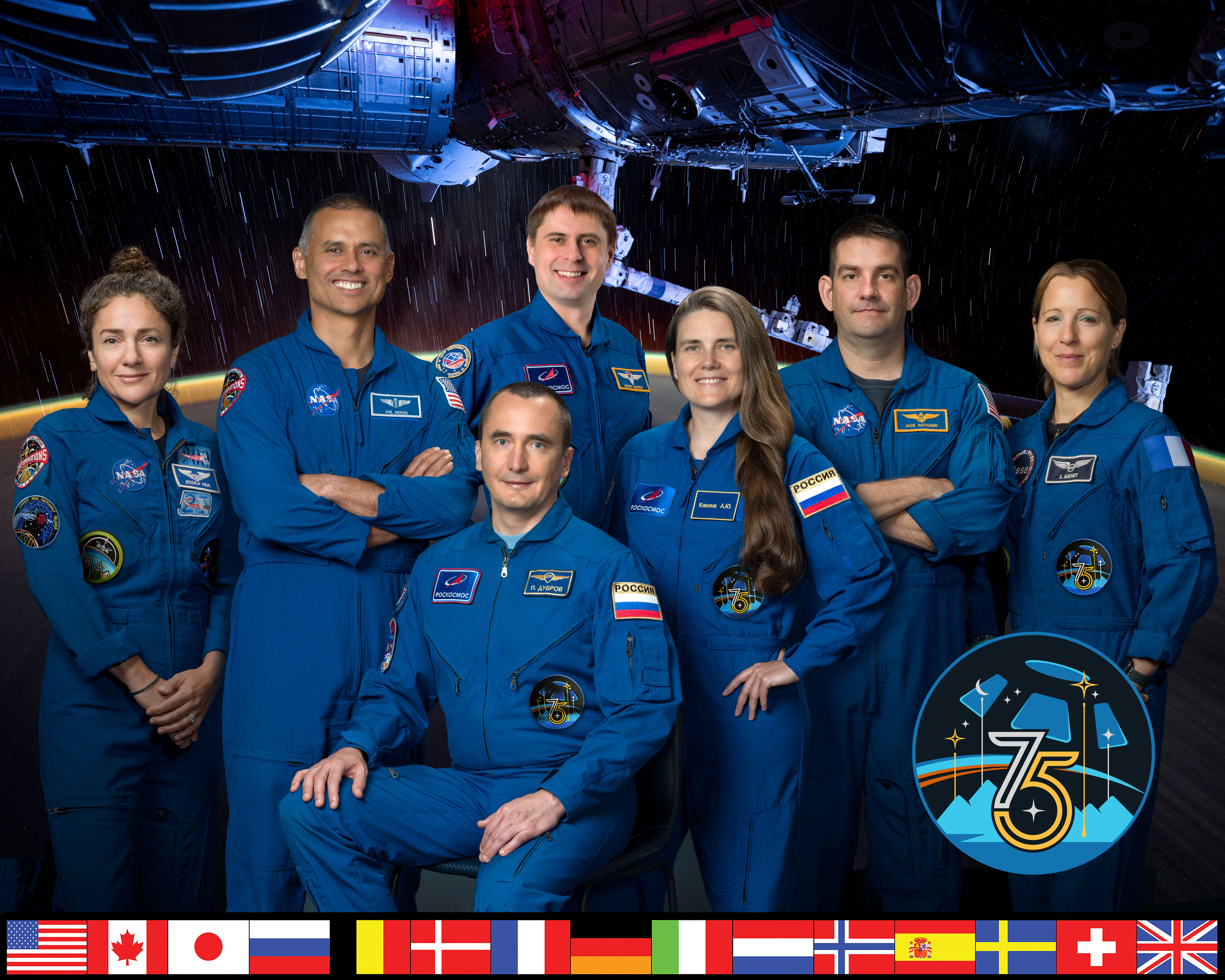
- Expedition 75 mission insignia: The first half crew, from left to right: Meir, Menon, Dubrov, Fedyaev, Kikina, Hathaway, and Adenot; The second half crew, left to right: Teteryatnikov, Menon, Dubrov, Delaney, Kikina, Watkins, and Kutryk; Expeditions

Expedition 75 is the 75th long-duration expedition to the International Space Station (ISS). The expedition began with the departure of Soyuz MS-28 on 26 July 2026 with NASA astronaut Jessica Meir taking over the ISS command and is expected to conclude with the undocking of Soyuz MS-29 on 5 April 2027. It continues the extensive scientific research conducted aboard the ISS, focusing on various fields, including biology, human physiology, physics, and materials science. The crew members also maintain and upgrade the space station systems.

== Background, Crew, and Events ==
The expedition commenced with a crew consisting of NASA astronauts Jessica Meir, Jack Hathaway, and Anil Menon, ESA astronaut Sophie Adenot, and Roscosmos cosmonauts Andrey Fedyaev, Pyotr Dubrov, and Anna Kikina.

The expedition has seen six spacewalks so far. On August 6, 2026, Meir and Menon conducted a 6-hour, 27-minute spacewalk to modify the station's 3B power channel in preparation for the installation of a seventh iROSA. On August 18, Menon and Adenot conducted a 6-hour, 23-minute spacewalk to remove an antenna used to transmit data between the station and Mission Control in Houston. On August 25, Menon and Adenot conducted a 6-hour, 30-minute spacewalk to install an onboard spare space-to-ground antenna. On September 1, Adenot and Meir conducted a 6-hour, 49-minute spacewalk to replace a retroreflector on the forward docking port of the Harmony module used to improve navigation data for visiting spacecraft and connect power channel cables and data relay systems as part of ongoing maintenance and deorbit preparations.

SpaceX Crew-13 arrived at the ISS on October 1, transporting NASA astronauts Jessica Watkins and Luke Delaney, CSA astronaut Joshua Kutryk, and Roscosmos cosmonaut Sergey Teteryatnikov. The mission featured a handover with Crew-12 of six days. Meir handed over command to Dubrov on October 4. Crew-12 departed with Meir, Hathaway, Adenot, and Fedyaev on October 7.

On October 29, Menon and Kutyrk conducted a 7-hour, 11-minute spacewalk to install and deploy the seventh iROSA on the 2A electrical power channel, which will provide additional power to support critical station operations. On November 5, Kutryk and Menon conducted a 6-hour, 59-minute spacewalk to install and deploy the eighth and final iROSA on the 3B power channel, completing upgrades to the station's power system augmentation.

== Events manifest ==
Events involving crewed spacecraft are listed in bold.

Previous mission: Expedition 74

- 26 July 2026 – **Soyuz MS-28 undocking, official switch from Expedition 74**
- 6 August 2026 – EVA 1 (US-96) Meir/Menon: 6 hrs, 27 mins
- 18 August 2026 – EVA 2 (US-97) Menon/Adenot: 6 hrs, 23 mins
- 25 August 2026 – EVA 3 (US-98) Menon/Adenot: 6 hrs, 30 mins
- 1 September 2026 – EVA 4 (US-99) Adenot/Meir: 6 hrs, 49 mins
- 7 September 2026 – Progress MS-33 undocking
- 19 September 2026 – Progress MS-35 docking
- 1 October 2026 – **SpaceX Crew-13 docking**
- 4 October 2026 – ISS Expedition 75 change of command from Jessica Meir to Pyotr Dubrov
- 7 October 2026 – **SpaceX Crew-12 undocking**
- 9 October 2026 – CRS NG-24 unberthing and release
- 15 October 2026 – CRS SpX-35 docking
- 29 October 2026 – EVA 5 (US-100) Menon/Kutryk: 7 hrs, 11 mins
- 5 November 2026 – EVA 6 (US-101) Kutryk/Menon: 6 hrs, 59 mins
- 20 November 2026 – CRS SpX-35 undocking
- 22 November 2026 – Progress MS-34 undocking (planned)
- 26 November 2026 – Progress MS-36 docking (planned)
- 1 December 2026 – CRS NG-25 capture and berthing (planned)

Next mission: Expedition 76

== Crew ==
| Flight | Astronaut | Increment 75a | Increment 75b | Increment 75c | Increment 75d |
| Flight | Astronaut | 26 Jul–1 Oct 2026 | 1–7 Oct 2026 | 7 Oct 2026–24 Mar 2027 (ongoing) | 24 Mar–5 Apr 2027 (planned) |
|---|---|---|---|---|---|
| Soyuz MS-29 | Pyotr Dubrov, Roscosmos; Second spaceflight | Flight engineer | | Commander | |
| Soyuz MS-29 | Anna Kikina, Roscosmos; Second spaceflight | Flight engineer | | | |
| Soyuz MS-29 | Anil Menon, NASA; First spaceflight | Flight engineer | | | |
| SpaceX Crew-12 | Jessica Meir, NASA; Second spaceflight | Commander | | Off station | |
| SpaceX Crew-12 | Jack Hathaway, NASA; First spaceflight | Flight engineer | | Off station | |
| SpaceX Crew-12 | Sophie Adenot, ESA; First spaceflight | Flight engineer | | Off station | |
| SpaceX Crew-12 | Andrey Fedyaev, Roscosmos; Second spaceflight | Flight engineer | | Off station | |
| SpaceX Crew-13 | Jessica Watkins, NASA; Second spaceflight | Off station | Flight engineer | | |
| SpaceX Crew-13 | Luke Delaney, NASA; First spaceflight | Off station | Flight engineer | | |
| SpaceX Crew-13 | Joshua Kutryk, CSA; First spaceflight | Off station | Flight engineer | | |
| SpaceX Crew-13 | Sergey Teteryatnikov, Roscosmos; First spaceflight | Off station | Flight engineer | | |
| Soyuz MS-30 | Dmitry Petelin, Roscosmos; Second spaceflight | Off station | | | Flight engineer |
| Soyuz MS-30 | Konstantin Borisov, Roscosmos; Second spaceflight | Off station | | | Flight engineer |
| Soyuz MS-30 | Deniz Burnham, NASA; First spaceflight | Off station | | | Flight engineer |

== Vehicle manifest ==
| Vehicle | Purpose | Port | Docking date | Undocking date |
Vehicles inherited from Expedition 74
| SpaceX Crew-12 "Freedom" | Exp. 74/75 crew | Harmony zenith | 14 Feb 2026 | 7 Oct 2026 |
| Progress MS-33 | Cargo | Poisk zenith | 24 Mar 2026 | 7 Sep 2026 |
| CRS NG-24 | Cargo | Unity nadir | 13 Apr 2026 | 9 Oct 2026 |
| Progress MS-34 | Cargo | Zvezda aft | 28 Apr 2026 | 22 Nov 2026 |
| Soyuz MS-29 "Tigris" | Exp. 74/75 crew | Prichal nadir | 14 Jul 2026 | 5 Apr 2027 |
Vehicles docked during Expedition 75
| Progress MS-35 | Cargo | Poisk zenith | 19 Sep 2026 | Feb 2027 |
| SpaceX Crew-13 "Grace" | Exp. 75 crew | Harmony forward | 1 Oct 2026 | Mar 2027 |
| CRS SpX-35 | Cargo | Harmony zenith | 15 Oct 2026 | 20 Nov 2026 |

| Segment | US Orbital Segment | | | | Russian Orbital Segment | | | |
| Period | Harmony forward | Harmony zenith | Harmony nadir | Unity nadir | Rassvet nadir | Prichal nadir | Poisk zenith | Zvezda aft |
|---|---|---|---|---|---|---|---|---|
| 26 Jul–7 Sep 2026 | Vacant | SpaceX Crew-12 | Vacant | CRS NG-24 | Vacant | Soyuz MS-29 | Progress MS-33 | Progress MS-34 |
| 7–19 Sep 2026 | Vacant | SpaceX Crew-12 | Vacant | CRS NG-24 | Vacant | Soyuz MS-29 | Vacant | Progress MS-34 |
| 19 Sep–1 Oct 2026 | Vacant | SpaceX Crew-12 | Vacant | CRS NG-24 | Vacant | Soyuz MS-29 | Progress MS-35 | Progress MS-34 |
| 1–7 Oct 2026 | SpaceX Crew-13 | SpaceX Crew-12 | Vacant | CRS NG-24 | Vacant | Soyuz MS-29 | Progress MS-35 | Progress MS-34 |
| 7–9 Oct 2026 | SpaceX Crew-13 | Vacant | Vacant | CRS NG-24 | Vacant | Soyuz MS-29 | Progress MS-35 | Progress MS-34 |
| 9–15 Oct 2026 | SpaceX Crew-13 | Vacant | Vacant | Vacant | Vacant | Soyuz MS-29 | Progress MS-35 | Progress MS-34 |
| 15 Oct–20 Nov 2026 | SpaceX Crew-13 | CRS SpX-35 | Vacant | Vacant | Vacant | Soyuz MS-29 | Progress MS-35 | Progress MS-34 |
| 20 Nov 2026–present | SpaceX Crew-13 | Vacant | Vacant | Vacant | Vacant | Soyuz MS-29 | Progress MS-35 | Progress MS-34 |

The Prichal aft, forward, starboard, and aft ports all have yet to be used since the module originally docked to the station and are not included in the table.
