= Progress MS-36 =

Russian resupply spaceflight to the ISS

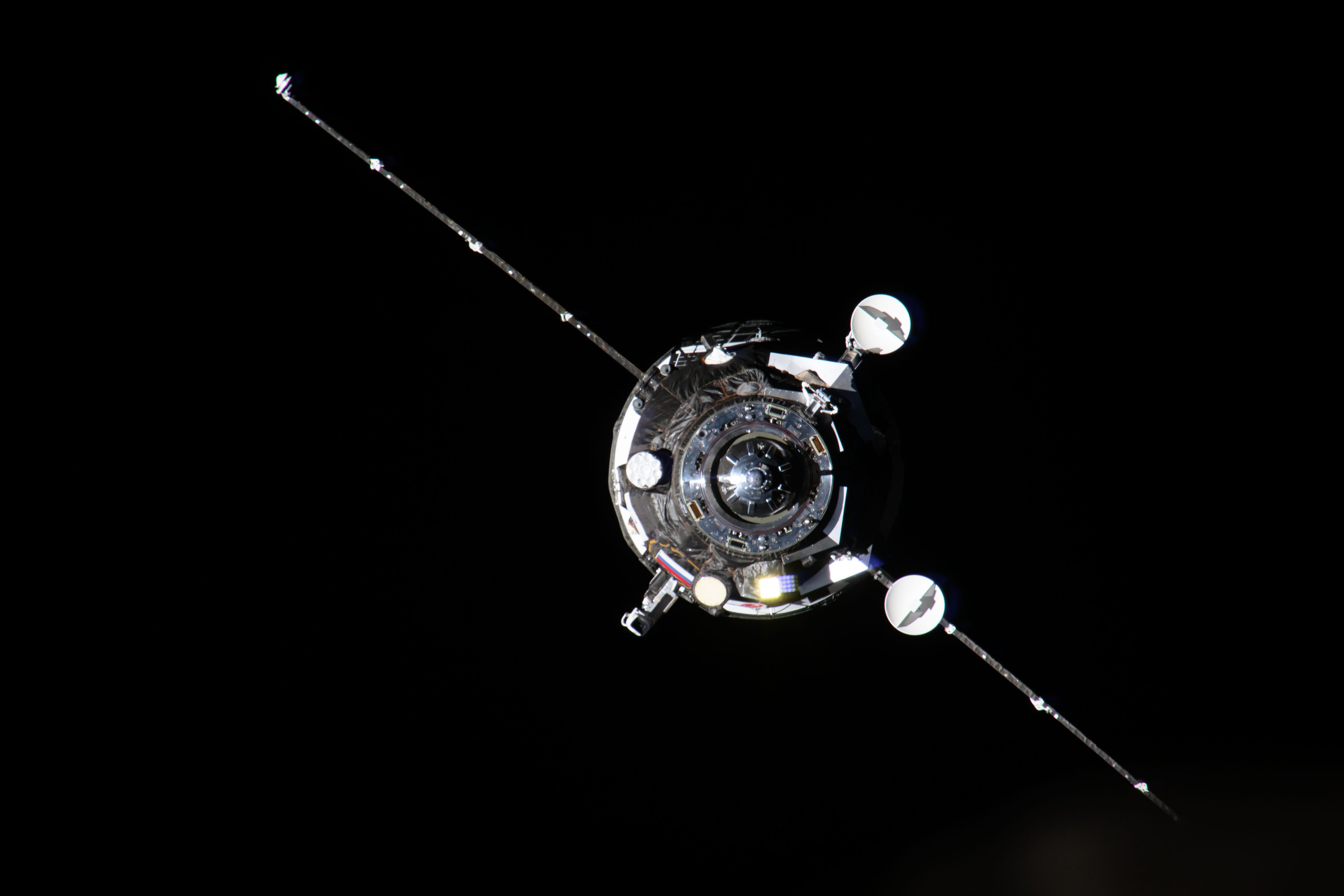
- Progress MS spacecraft on its final approach to dock to the ISS
- Names: Progress 97; ISS 97P
- Mission type: ISS resupply
- Operator: Roscosmos

Spacecraft properties
- Spacecraft: Progress MS-36 No. 463
- Spacecraft type: Progress MS
- Manufacturer: Energia
- Launch mass: 7,280 kg (16,050 lb)

Start of mission
- Launch date: 24 November 2026, 09:03 UTC
- Rocket: Soyuz-2.1a
- Launch site: Baikonur, Site 31/6
- Contractor: RKTs Progress

End of mission
- Disposal: Deorbited (planned)

Orbital parameters
- Reference system: Geocentric orbit
- Regime: Low Earth orbit
- Inclination: 51.65°

Docking with ISS
- Docking port: Zvezda aft
- Docking date: 26 November 2026 (planned)
- Undocking date: 2027 (planned)

Progress MS-36 (Russian: Прогресс МC-36), Russian production No. 463, identified by NASA as Progress 97, is a Progress cargo spacecraft mission by Roscosmos to resupply the International Space Station (ISS).

== See also ==
- Uncrewed spaceflights to the International Space Station
- List of Progress missions
