= Sergey Teteryatnikov =

Russian cosmonaut

- Сергей Тетерятников
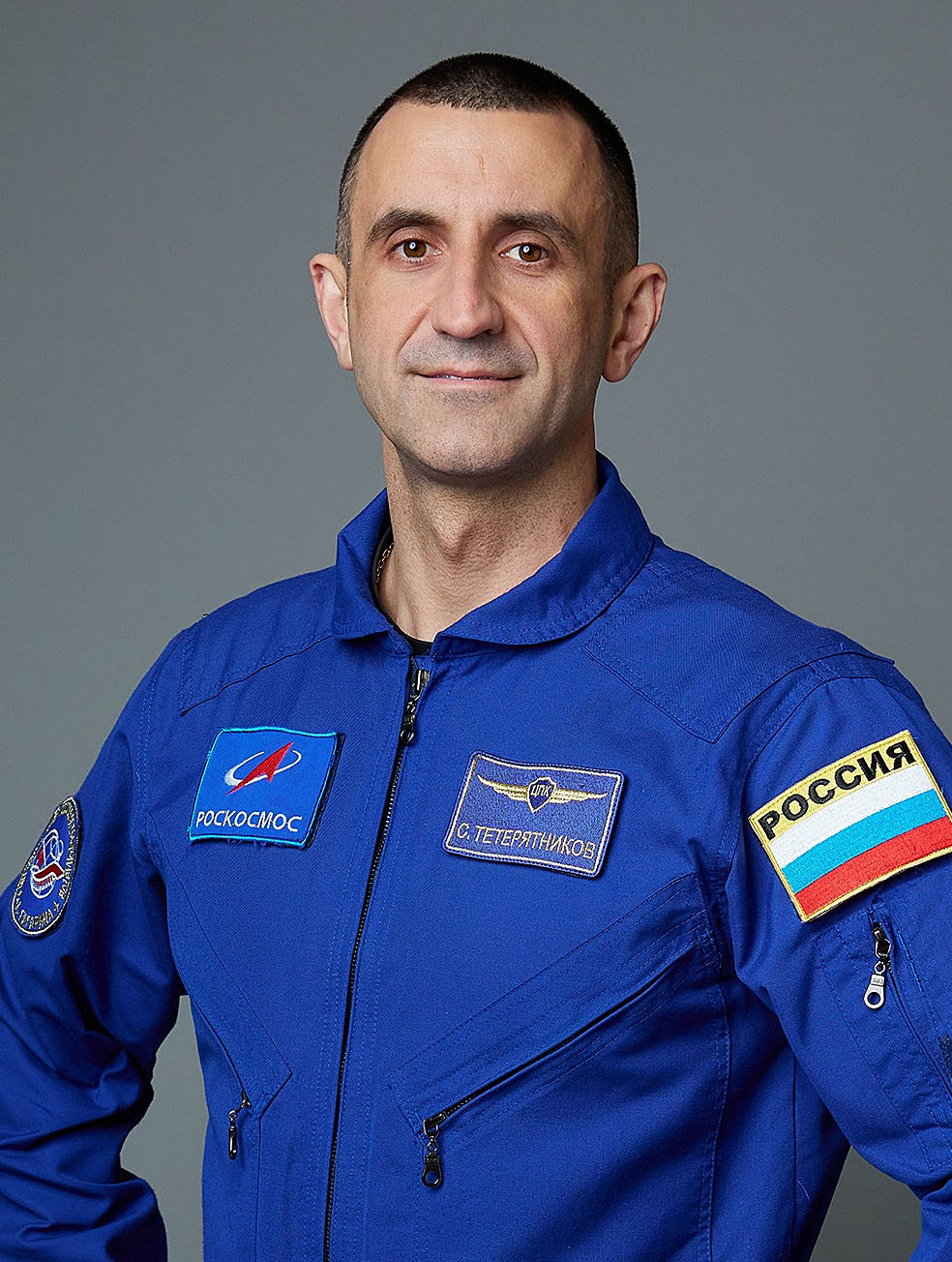
- Teteryatnikov in 2026
- Born: Sergey Aleksandrovich Teteryatnikov; December 19, 1988 (age 37); Uspenovka, Stavropol Krai, Russian SFSR, Soviet Union
- Education: Kuznetsov Naval Academy
- Space career

Roscosmos cosmonaut
- Current occupation: Test cosmonaut
- Previous occupation: Engineer (submarine operations)
- Status: Active
- Rank: Captain, 3rd rank, Russian Navy
- Time in space: 3 days, 5 hours, 17 minutes (currently in space)
- Selection: 2021 Cosmonaut Group
- Missions: SpaceX Crew-13 (Expedition 75/76)

Sergey Aleksandrovich Teteryatnikov (Russian: Сергей Александрович Тетерятников; born 19 December 1988) is a Russian cosmonaut.

== Early life and education ==
Teteryatnikov graduated from the Naval Engineering Institute.

== Career ==
Prior to his selection as a cosmonaut candidate, Teteryatnikov worked on the operation of submarines.

== Cosmonaut career ==
In January 2021, Teteryatnikov was selected as one of four cosmonaut candidates by Roscosmos from an open recruitment process that began in 2019. The other selectees were Sergey Irtuganov, Alexander Kolyabin, and Harutyun Kiviryan.

He began general space training at the Yuri Gagarin Cosmonaut Training Center.

Teteryatnikov launched on SpaceX Crew-13 in October 2026 as part of the ISS Expedition 75/76.
