= Harutyun Kiviryan =

Russian cosmonaut (born 1993)

- Арутюн Кивирян
- Born: 23 August 1993 (age 33); Maikop, Adygea, Russia
- Space career

Roscosmos cosmonaut
- Current occupation: Test cosmonaut
- Status: Active
- Rank: Major, Russian Air Force
- Selection: TsPK 2021 Cosmonaut Group

Harutyun Harutyunovich Kiviryan (Russian: Арутюн Арутюнович Кивирян) is a Russian rocket engineer and cosmonaut of Armenian ancestry selected in the TsPK 2021 Cosmonaut Group.

== Biography ==
Kiviryan was born in Maikop, in Adygea on August 23, 1993 and is of Armenian ancestry. While in lyceum he also attended college-level math and physics classes at the Adyghe State University before transferring to the St. Petersburg Suvorov Military School where he graduated in 2010. Afterwards he earned an engineering degree from the Baltic State Technical University in 2015 with a specialty in rockets. From 2012 until his graduation from military university in 2015 he served in the Russian Air Force maintaining cruise missiles. After graduating he worked for RSC Energia as a test engineer.

On January 27, 2021, Kiviryan was selected from a pool of candidates to become a Roscosmos Test cosmonaut. Kiviryan underwent 2-years of mandatory cosmonaut training and became eligible to be assigned to future missions starting in 2023. On March 12, 2026, he was assigned to the backup crew of SpaceX Crew-13.

On September 24, 2026, NASA announced that Kiviryan was assigned as a mission specialist of the SpaceX Crew-14 mission to the International Space Station. He will fly as part of Expedition 75/76.
