= Jessica Watkins =

American astronaut (born 1988)

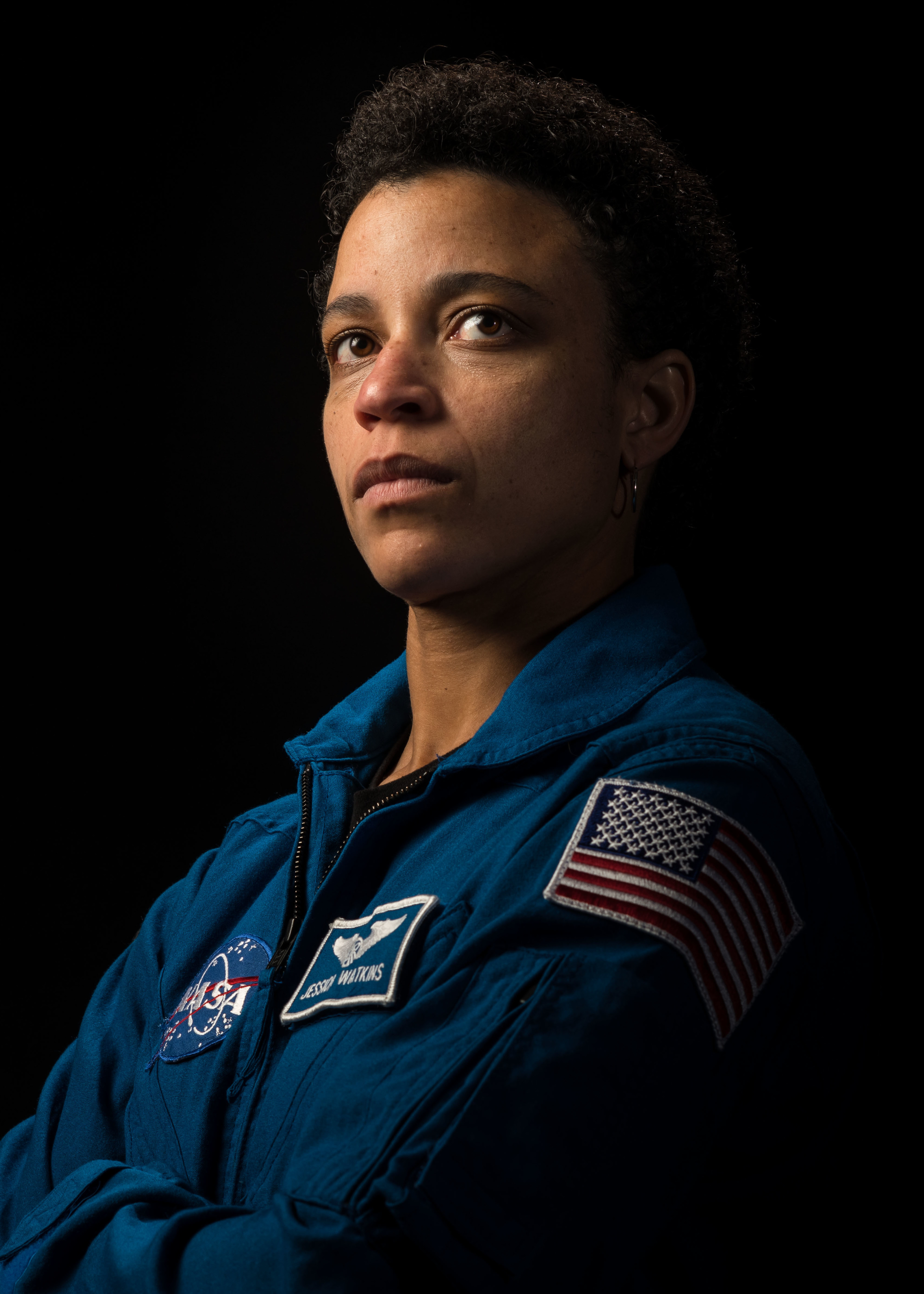
- Watkins in 2021
- Born: Jessica Andrea Watkins; May 14, 1988 (age 38); Gaithersburg, Maryland, U.S.
- Education: Stanford University (BS); University of California, Los Angeles (MS, PhD)
- Space career

NASA astronaut
- Time in space: 180 days, 12 hours, 13 minutes (currently in space)
- Selection: NASA Group 22 (2017)
- Missions: SpaceX Crew-4 (Expedition 67/68); SpaceX Crew-13 (Expedition 75/76)
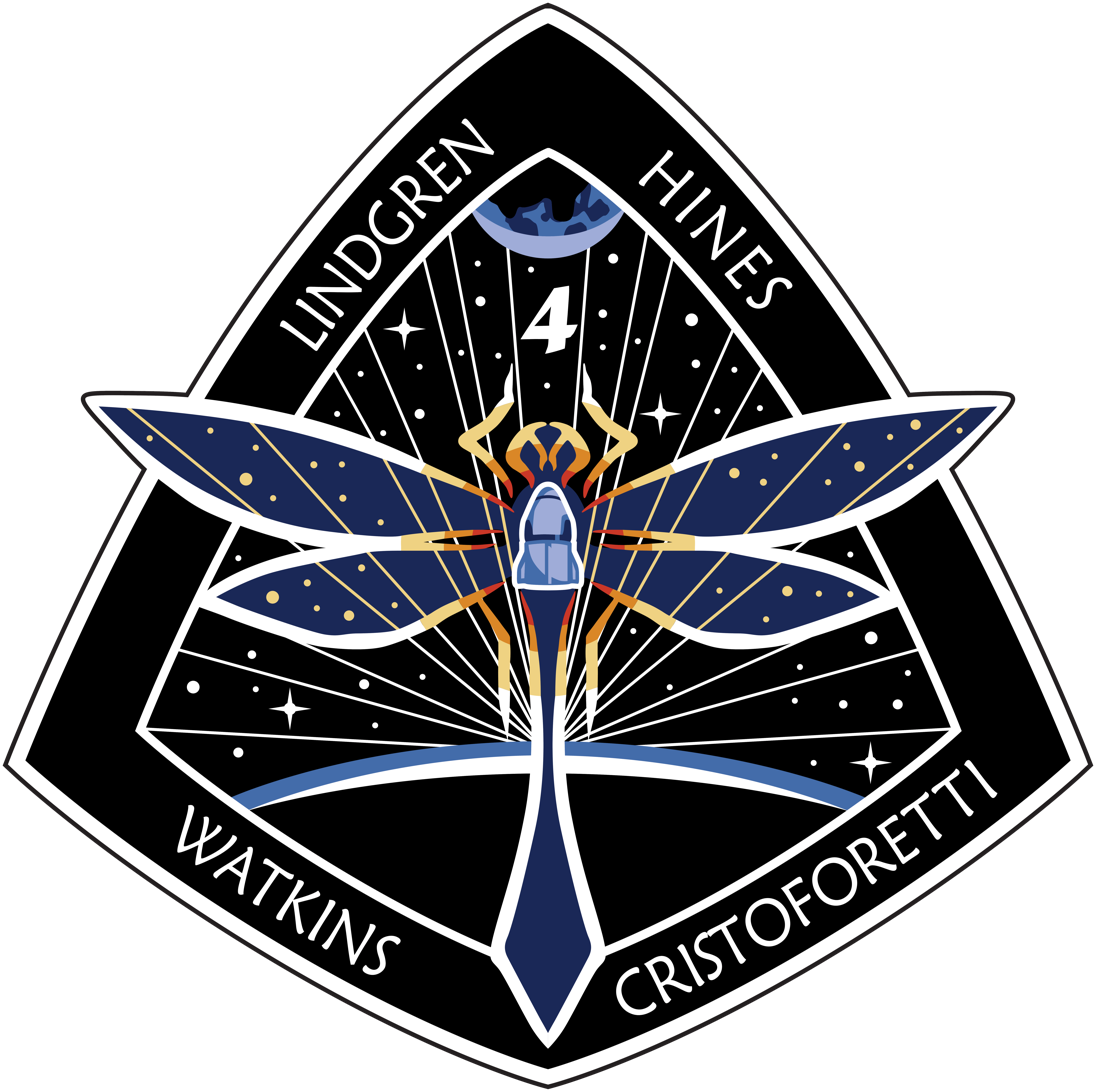
- Mission insignia
- Scientific career
- Fields: Geology
- Thesis: Tectonic and Aqueous Processes in the Formation of Mass-Wasting Features on Mars and Earth (2015)
- Doctoral advisor: An Yin

Jessica Andrea Watkins (born May 14, 1988) is an American NASA astronaut, geologist, aquanaut, and former international rugby player. Watkins was announced as the first Black woman to serve on the International Space Station for a long-term mission in April 2022. On June 9, 2022, at 7:38 UTC, she became the Black woman with the most time in space, surpassing Stephanie Wilson's 43 days. On October 1, 2026, Watkins became the first Black woman to command a crewed orbital spaceflight (as commander of SpaceX Crew-13, a NASA mission to the International Space Station).

== Early life and education ==
Jessica "Watty" Watkins was born on May 14, 1988, in Gaithersburg, Maryland, to Michael and Carolyn Watkins. Her family moved to Lafayette, Colorado, where she graduated from Fairview High School in 2006. She earned a bachelor's degree in geological and environmental sciences at Stanford University where she was a member of the rugby team.

After Stanford, Watkins earned a Ph.D. in geology at the University of California, Los Angeles. Her graduate research, under the supervision of professor An Yin, focused on emplacement mechanisms for landslides on Mars and Earth, including the effect of water activity. Prior to her selection as an astronaut candidate, Watkins was a postdoctoral fellow at the California Institute of Technology, where she was also an assistant coach to the women's basketball team.

== Rugby career ==
Watkins began playing rugby during her freshman year at Stanford and remained on the team for four years. In 2008, during her sophomore year, she was a member of the Division I national champion team. In both 2008 and 2010, Watkins became a First Team Collegiate Rugby All-American. She is a former American women's national team rugby player for the sevens, and played for the USA Eagles in its 3rd-place finish at the 2009 Rugby World Cup Sevens. During the World Cup she was the leading try scorer for the US team.

== NASA career ==
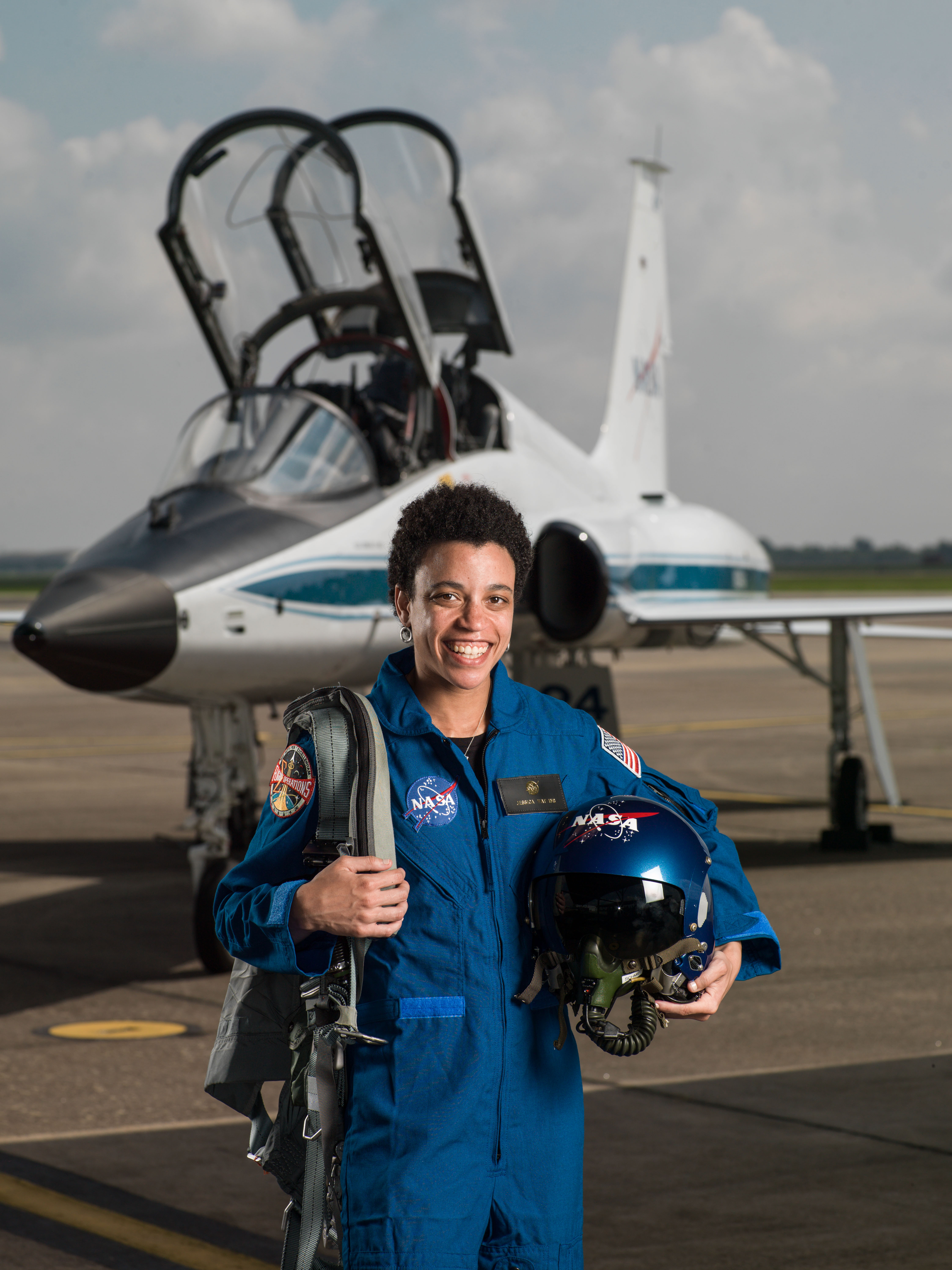
Watkins as a NASA astronaut candidate in June 2017

As an undergraduate, Watkins worked at the Ames Research Center to support the Mars Phoenix lander and prototype Mars drill testing. In 2009, she was chief geologist for the NASA Spaceward Bound Crew 86 at the Mars Desert Research Station. As a graduate student, she worked at the Jet Propulsion Laboratory on the NEOWISE project to survey near-Earth asteroids. Watkins also worked on planning for the Mars rover Curiosity. In 2011, Watkins served as a science operations team member for an analog mission.

She has served as a planner for the Mars 2020 rover and a Mars sample-return mission, and was a science team member for a Desert Research and Technology Studies analog mission. As a postdoctoral fellow at the California Institute of Technology, and as a collaborator on the Mars Science Laboratory Science Team, she participated in daily planning of the Mars rover activities and uses its image data combined with orbital data to investigate the stratigraphy, geology, and geomorphology of Mars. She also contributed to the design of the prospective Uranus orbiter OCEANUS in 2016.

In June 2017, Watkins was selected as a member of NASA Astronaut Group 22 and began her two-year training in August. In December 2020, she was selected to be a part of the Artemis Team to return humans to the Moon. At the time, 2025 was the target date for the crewed lunar landing mission; since then, there has been schedule creep to no earlier than 2027. In November 2021, she became the 4th astronaut of Group 22, and first Black woman, to be assigned a long-duration mission to the International Space Station (ISS) after being chosen as the final member of SpaceX Crew-4, which launched in April 2022.

It was Watkins’ first time in space. She served as a mission specialist for the six-month mission. Her role involved observing and photographing geological changes on Earth, as well as other investigations into Earth and space science, biological science, and the effects of long-duration spaceflight on humans.

On April 23, 2026, NASA announced that Watkins was assigned to fly on the SpaceX Crew-13 mission in October 2026 to become part of the ISS Expedition 75/76 crew. She is the commander of the Crew-13 mission. It is her second mission to the station as well as becoming NASA's first astronaut to ride on a Crew Dragon twice.

=== NEEMO 23 ===
Watkins participated in NEEMO mission 23 from June 10 to 22, 2019. This mission tested technologies and objectives for deep space mission and lunar explorations on the seafloor. Watkins’ NEEMO mission was the first of its kind to feature an all-female research team led by Italian astronaut Samantha Cristoforetti.

== Personal life ==
Watkins' parents live in Lafayette, Colorado. She has one sister.

== Awards and honors ==
Watkins has received numerous awards for her career, academic, and athletic accomplishments, including:

- Jessica Watkins Day, April 19, 2022, City of Lafayette, Colorado
- Stanford Earth Early- to Mid- Career Alumni Award, 2018
- Caltech Division of Geological and Planetary Sciences Chair's Postdoctoral Fellowship, 2015
- Postdoctoral Fellowship, California Alliance for Graduate Education and the Professoriate (AGEP), 2015
- NASA Group Achievement Award, Mars Science Laboratory Prime Mission Science and Operations Team, 2015
- Harold and Mayla Sullwold Scholarship for Academic Excellence and Outstanding Original Research, UCLA Department of Earth and Space Sciences, 2012
- Graduate Research Fellowship in Geosciences, National Science Foundation, 2012
- Diversity in the Geosciences Minority Research Grant Award, Geological Society of America, 2011
- Chancellor's Prize, UCLA, 2010
- California Space Grant Consortium Fellowship, 2010
- Division I College Rugby National Champion, Stanford Women's Rugby, 2008
- USA Rugby Collegiate All-American, 2008-2010
- Women's Sevens Rugby World Cup Semi-finalist, USA Eagles, 2009

== See also ==
- List of African-American astronauts
