= Luke Delaney (astronaut) =

American astronaut (born 1979)

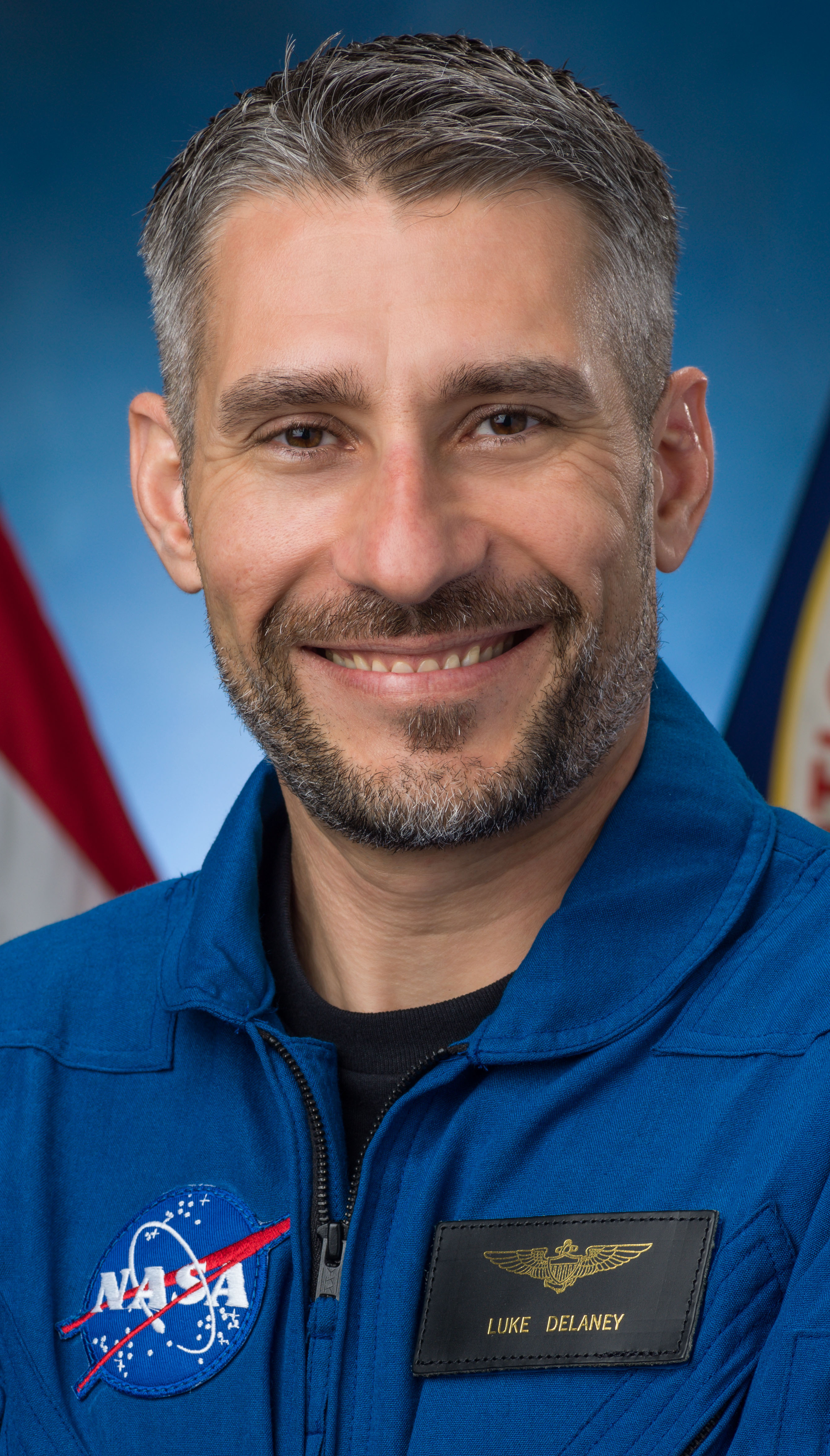
- NASA portrait, 2021
- Born: August 25, 1979 (age 47); Miami, Florida, U.S.
- Education: University of North Florida (BS); Naval Postgraduate School (MS)
- Spouse: Tracy Delaney
- Children: 2
- Space career

NASA astronaut
- Time in space: 3 days, 5 hours, 2 minutes (currently in space)
- Selection: NASA Group 23 (2021)
- Missions: SpaceX Crew-13 (Expedition 75/76)
- Military career
- Branch: United States Marine Corps
- Years: 1998–2020
- Rank: Major

Luke Delaney (born August 25, 1979) is an American NASA astronaut and retired major in the United States Marine Corps. Delaney is from DeBary, Florida.

== Early life and education ==
He graduated from Deltona High School in Deltona, Florida. He holds a degree in mechanical engineering from the University of North Florida and a master’s degree in aerospace engineering from the Naval Postgraduate School.

== Military career ==
Delaney began his military career by enlisting in the United States Marine Corps in 1998. He is a distinguished naval aviator who participated in exercises throughout the Asia-Pacific region and conducted combat missions in support of Operation Enduring Freedom. He completed the Naval Aircrew Candidate School at Naval Air Station Pensacola where he was selected to be a USMC KC-130 enlisted Aerial Navigator. Graduated from the Marine Corps Expeditionary Warfare School in Quantico, Virginia. He attended enlisted Marine Aerial Navigator School, collocated with the USAF-USN Specialized Undergraduate Navigator Training (SUNT) program for USAF and USN officers at Randolph Air Force Base, Texas. He was then assigned to VMGR-352 at Marine Corps Air Station Miramar, California.

In December 2001, Delaney deployed to Afghanistan attached to Task Force 58 (TF-58) in support of Operation Enduring Freedom where he was selected for the Marine Corps Enlisted Commissioning Education Program (MCECP). Following completion of his undergraduate education in engineering, he was commissioned as a 2nd Lieutenant in the Marine Corps and reported to The Basic School (TBS) at Marine Corps Base Quantico, Virginia. After TBS he commenced flight training at Naval Air Station Pensacola, followed by primary, intermediate and advanced flight training at Naval Air Station Corpus Christi, earning his Naval Aviator wings in 2008. He then returned to flying the KC-130, this time as a pilot, and after transition training was assigned to VMGR-152 at Marine Corps Air Station Iwakuni, Japan.

Delaney returned to MCB Quantico where he graduated Expeditionary Warfare School in May 2013. While there he was selected for U.S. Naval Test Pilot School (USNTPS) at Naval Air Station Patuxent River, Maryland, graduating with Class 146 to become a Flight Test Pilot and Project Officer at Air Test and Evaluation Squadron TWO ZERO (VX-20). There he also served as Platform Coordinator overseeing substantial aircraft modifications and managing numerous developmental projects. He executed a variety of test flights to include KC-130J Large Aircraft Infrared Countermeasures (LAIRCM) and Harvest High Altitude Weapons Kit (HAWK) Upgrade. In 2018, Delaney returned to USNTPS to become a test pilot instructor. He managed academic and flight syllabi for fixed-wing handling qualities, qualitative evaluations, and airplane performance. Instructing in the T-6B, C-12C, U-6A, and NU-1B, he conducted a variety of flight exercises, demonstrations, and evaluations. Retiring from the Marine Corps in 2020, he transitioned to NASA Langley as a Research Pilot and aerospace engineer.

As a test pilot, he executed numerous flights evaluating weapon systems integration, and he served as a test pilot instructor. Delaney retired from the Marine Corps in 2020 and transitioned as a research pilot at NASA’s Langley Research Center, in Hampton, Virginia, where he supported airborne science missions. Including his NASA career, Delaney logged more than 3,700 flight hours on 48 models of jet, propeller, and rotary wing aircraft.

== NASA career ==
On December 6, 2021, he was revealed to be one of the 10 candidates selected in the 2021 NASA Astronaut Group 23, to report for duty in January 2022.

Delaney launched on SpaceX Crew-13 in October 2026 as part of the ISS Expedition 75/76.
