= List of astronauts of Indian origin =

As of 2025, six people of origin have been in space. The first astronaut of the Indian nationality, in space was Rakesh Sharma on Soyuz T-11 as a part of the Interkosmos program in 1984. Three astronauts – Kalpana Chawla, Sunita Williams, Raja Chari – flew as NASA astronauts. Williams with three spaceflights, have the record of most number of spaceflights by an astronaut of Indian origin. Williams and Chari are the only astronauts to have made long-term spaceflights.

Sirisha Bandla is the first and only Indian-born woman to make a suborbital flight as a space tourist, which she did on Virgin Galactic Unity 22 on July 11, 2021.

== NASA Astronauts ==
=== Orbital ===
No.	Image	Name Birth date	Ancestry	Birth	Comment	Missions (Launch date)	Time in Space
1		Kalpana Chawla; March 17, 1962	India		First Indian American in space and First Indian origin woman in Space. Died on the Columbia.	(United States) STS-87 (November 19, 1997) (United States) STS-107 (January 16, 2003)	31 days, 14 hours, 54 minutes
2		Sunita Williams; September 19, 1965	India	United States	Served on ISS Expedition 14/15, Expedition 32/33 and Expedition 71/72. Second female commander of ISS. First female astronaut to fly on an orbital spacecraft's maiden flight, i.e., Boeing Starliner.	(United States) STS-116/117 (December 9, 2006) (Russia) Soyuz TMA-05M (July 15, 2012) (United States) Starliner Crewed Flight Test/SpaceX Crew-9 (June 5, 2024)	608 days, 20 minutes
3		Raja Chari; June 24, 1977	India	United States	Selected in 2017 to NASA Astronaut Group 22.	(United States) SpaceX Crew-3 (November 11, 2021)	176 days
4		Anil Menon; October 15, 1976	India	United States	Selected in 2021 to NASA Astronaut Group 23.	(Russia) Soyuz MS-29 (March 2026) (planned)	N/A

== Space Tourists ==
=== Suborbital ===
No.	Image	Name	Ancestry	Birth	Comment	Missions (Launch date)	Time in Space
1		Sirisha Bandla	India		Second Indian-born woman to fly to space, First Indian-American space tourist.	(United States) Virgin Galactic Unity 22 (July 11, 2021)	14 minutes, 17 seconds
2		Andy Sadhwani	India	United States	Principal Propulsion Engineer at SpaceX	(United States) Galactic 07 (June 8, 2024)	15 minutes, 10 seconds
3		Tushar Mehta	India	United States	a MIT graduate and Particle Physicist	(United States) Blue Origin NS-30 (February 25, 2025)	10 minutes, 8 seconds
4		Arvinder (Arvi) Singh Bahal	India		Indian-born real-estate investor, adventurer and private pilot.	(United States) Blue Origin NS-34 (August 3, 2025)	10 minutes, 8 seconds
