= NASA Astronaut Group 22 =

2017 human spaceflight selection of 12 candidates; "The Turtles"

The Turtles
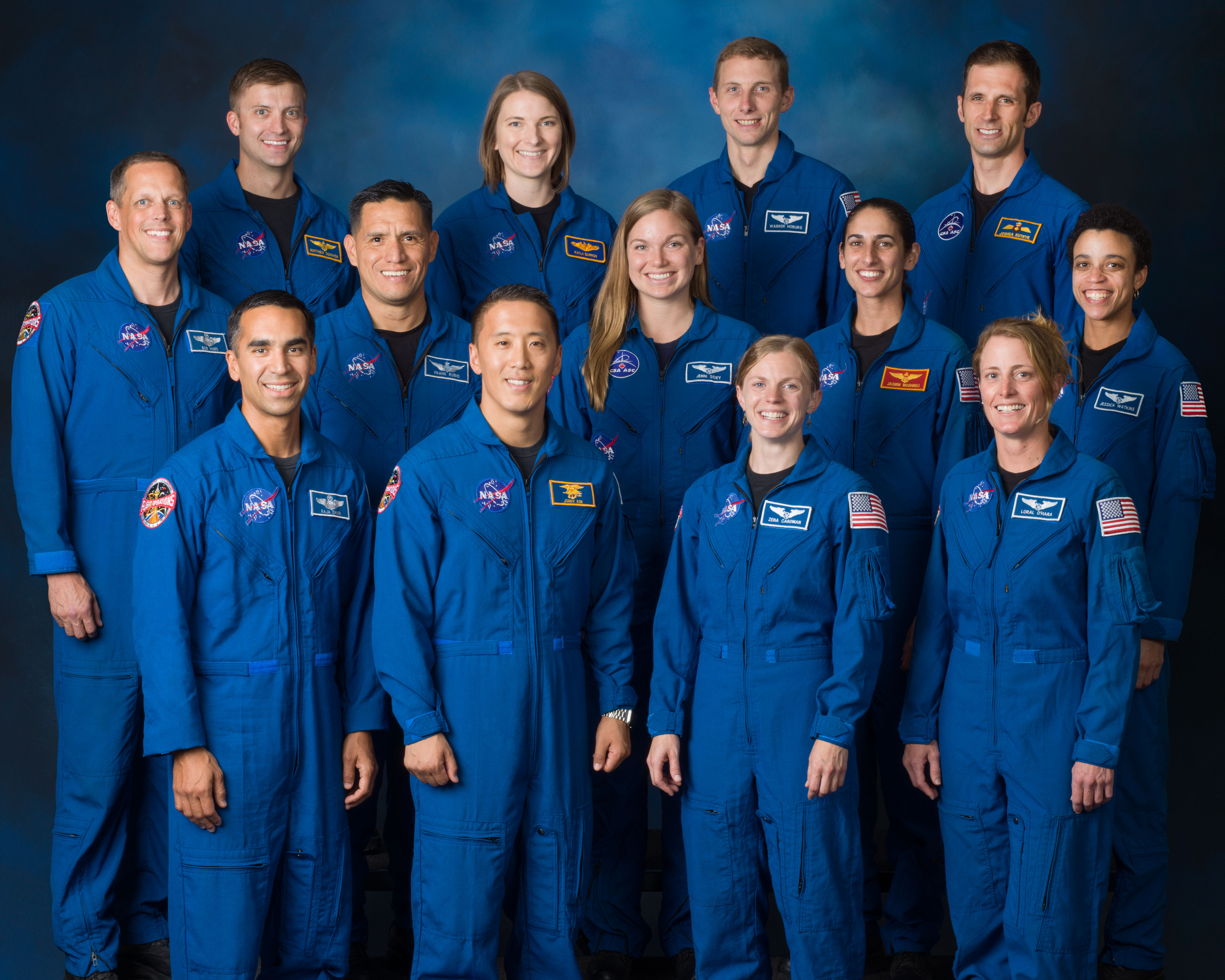
- NASA Astronaut Group 22 and the two Canadian astronauts in September 2019
- Year selected: 2017
- Number selected: 12

NASA Astronaut Group 22 (nicknamed "The Turtles") is a group of twelve NASA astronauts selected in June 2017. They were joined by two Canadian Space Agency astronauts for training.

== History ==
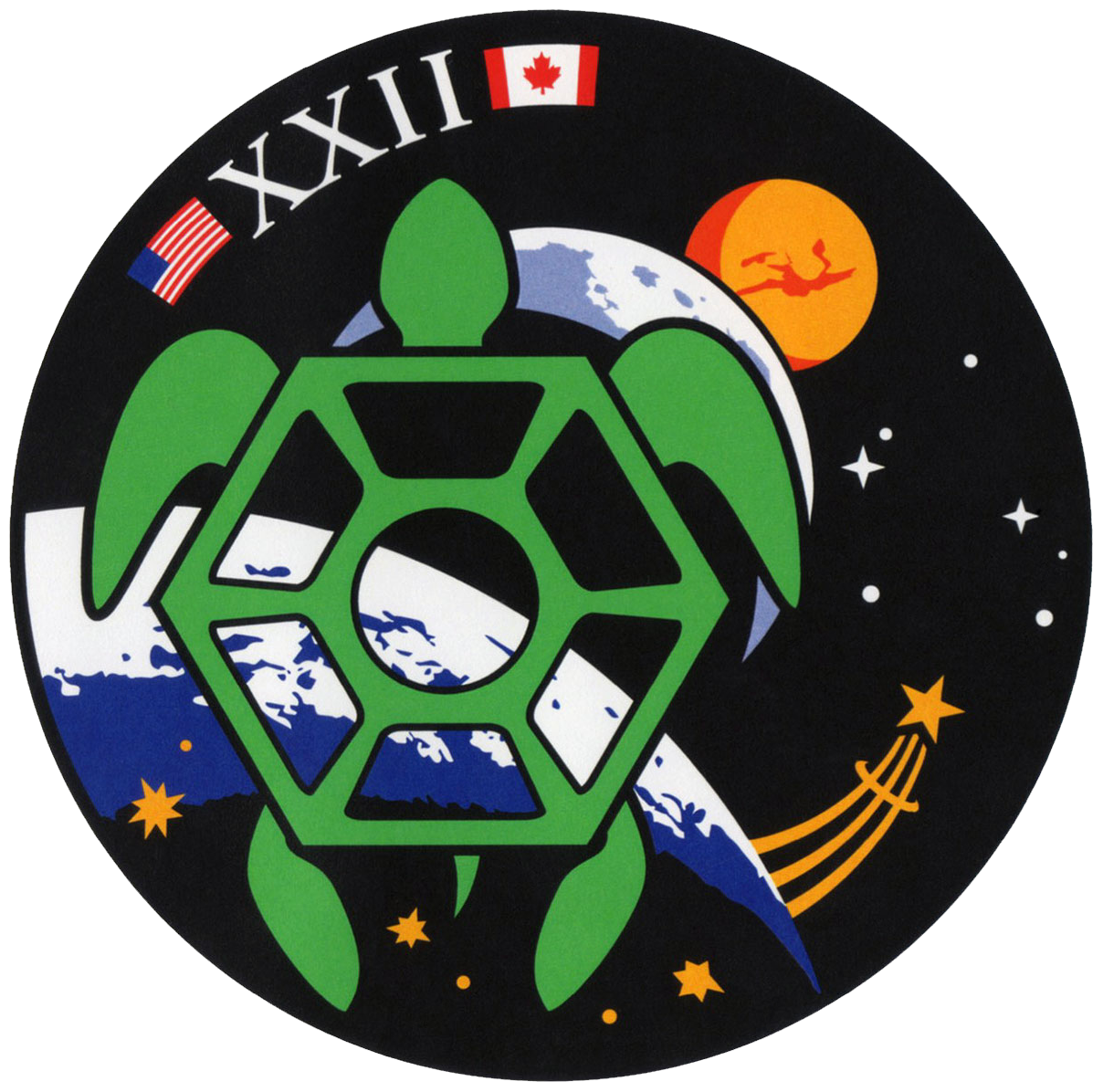
Group patch

NASA announced the creation of this astronaut group in November 2015 and accepted applications for astronaut hires from December 2015 through February 2016. A record number of applications - over 18,300 - were received. The final group of twelve selected candidates was publicly announced on June 7, 2017. The class was introduced at a press conference at the Johnson Space Center by U.S. Vice President Mike Pence. The ages of the seven men and six women ranged from 29 to 42 at the time of announcement.

The Group 22 astronaut candidates arrived at the Johnson Space Center in Houston for training in August 2017, and when their approximately two-year-long training program was complete in January 2020, they became available for future missions.

The group earned their "Turtles" nickname after experiencing flooding from Hurricane Harvey shortly after arriving at NASA. The name was chosen by the preceding astronaut group, "the 8-Balls", according to NASA traditions.

The first two members of this astronaut group to fly to space, Raja Chari and Kayla Barron on SpaceX Crew-3, took a toy stuffed turtle as zero-g indicator to pay a tribute to their astronaut group. Zena Cardman was the final member of this astronaut group to go to space on SpaceX Crew-11.

== Group members ==
- Kayla Barron (born 1987): Lt. Cmdr., U.S. Navy
  - Mission specialist, SpaceX Crew-3 (Expedition 66/67)
  - Commander, SpaceX Crew-14 (Expedition 75/76) – planned
- Zena Cardman (born 1987): biologist
  - Commander, SpaceX Crew-11 (Expedition 73/74)
- Raja Chari (born 1977): Col., U.S. Air Force
  - Commander, SpaceX Crew-3 (Expedition 66/67)
- Matthew Dominick (born 1981): Cmdr., U.S. Navy
  - Commander, SpaceX Crew-8 (Expedition 70/71/72)
- Bob Hines (born 1975): Col., U.S. Air Force, NASA research pilot
  - Pilot, SpaceX Crew-4 (Expedition 67/68)
  - Backup crew member, Artemis III
- Warren Hoburg (born 1985): assistant professor of Aeronautics and Astronautics, MIT
  - Pilot, SpaceX Crew-6 (Expedition 68/69)
  - Commander, Boeing Starliner-2 – planned
- Jonny Kim (born 1984): LCDR, U.S. Navy, physician, former U.S. Navy SEAL; retired 27 August 2026
  - Flight engineer, Soyuz MS-27 (Expedition 72/73)
- Jasmin Moghbeli (born 1983): LtCol., U.S. Marine Corps
  - Commander, SpaceX Crew-7 (Expedition 69/70)
- Loral O'Hara (born 1983): research engineer, Woods Hole Oceanographic Institution
  - Flight engineer, Soyuz MS-24 (Expedition 69/70)
- Francisco Rubio (born 1975): Maj., U.S. Army physician
  - Flight engineer, Soyuz MS-22/MS-23 (Expedition 67/68/69)
  - Mission specialist, Artemis III – planned
- Jessica Watkins (born 1988): postdoctoral fellow, California Institute of Technology
  - Mission specialist, SpaceX Crew-4 (Expedition 67/68)
  - Commander, SpaceX Crew-13 (Expedition 75)

== Canadian partner astronauts ==
The U.S. astronauts trained alongside two Canadian astronaut candidates:

- Joshua Kutryk (born 1982): LCol, Royal Canadian Air Force, test pilot, fighter pilot, engineer
  - Mission specialist, SpaceX Crew-13 (Expedition 75)
- Jenni Sidey-Gibbons (born 1988): Mechanical engineer, combustion scientist, and lecturer

== Former group member ==
- Robb Kulin (born 1983): Launch Chief Engineer, SpaceX – Resigned in August 2018 before completing his training.

== See also ==
- List of astronauts by year of selection
