= Matthias Maurer =

German astronaut (born 1970)

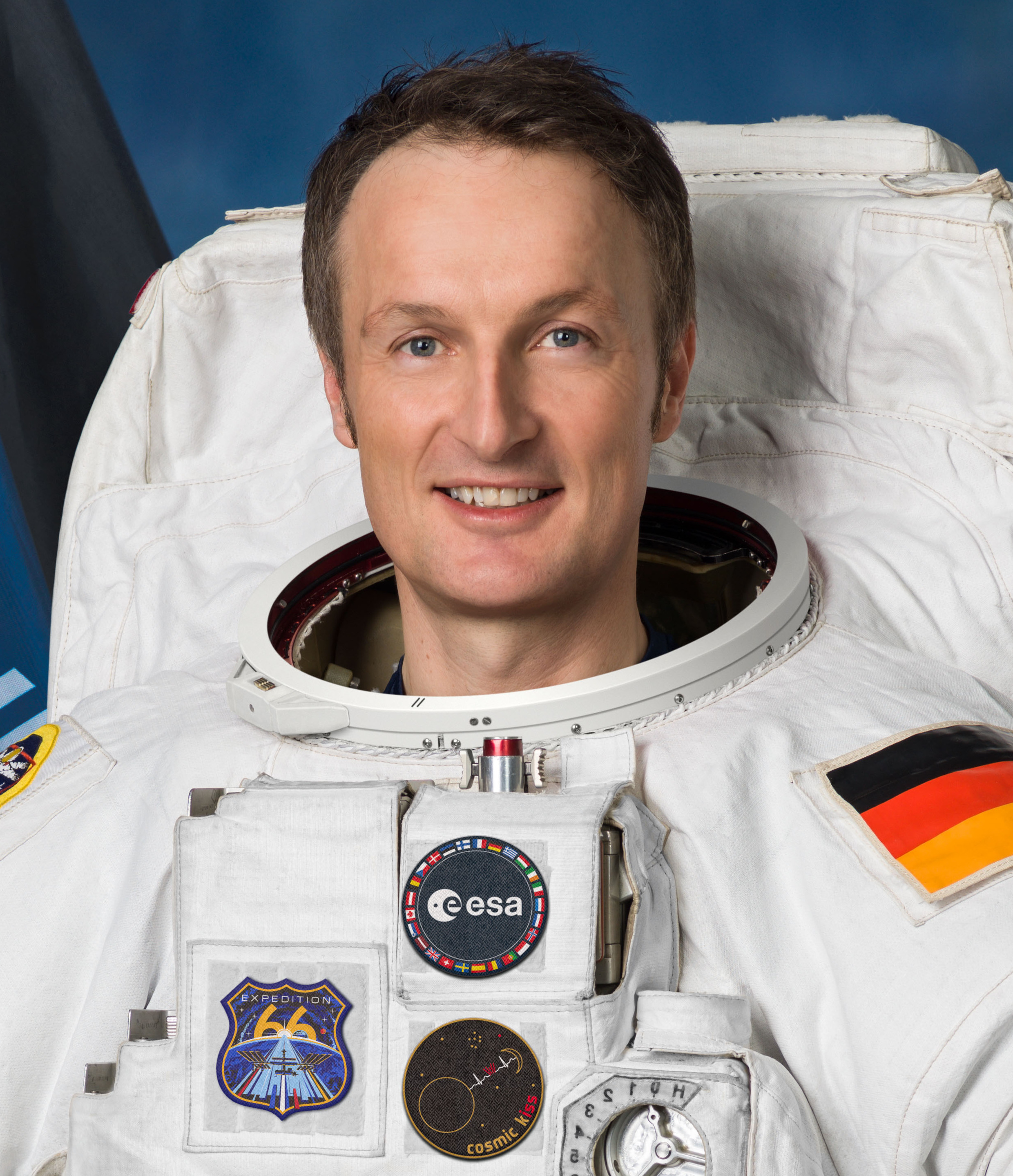
- Official portrait, 2020
- Born: 18 March 1970 (age 56); St. Wendel, Saarland, West Germany
- Occupations: Astronaut; Materials scientist
- Space career

ESA astronaut
- Status: Active
- Time in space: 176 days, 2 hours, 39 minutes
- Total EVAs: 1
- Total EVA time: 6 hours, 54 minutes
- Missions: SpaceX Crew-3 (Expedition 66/67)
- Mission insignia
- Website: matthiasmaurer.esa.int

Matthias Josef Maurer (born 18 March 1970) is a German ESA astronaut and materials scientist, who was selected in 2015 to take part in space training.

== Biography ==
Maurer graduated from Gymnasium Wendalinum in Sankt Wendel, Saarland, in 1989.) He then began his compulsory civilian service as a paramedic with the Malteser Emergency Service. Afterwards he studied materials science and technology at Saarland University in Saarbrücken, Germany, the EEIGM (École européenne d'ingénieurs en génie des matériaux, "European School for Materials Technology", part of the Université de Lorraine) in Nancy, France, the University of Leeds, UK, and at the Polytechnic University of Catalonia (Universitat Politècnica de Catalunya) in Barcelona, Spain. From 1999 to 2004, Maurer completed his doctorate at the Institute of Materials Sciences of the RWTH Aachen University, Germany, where he received his engineering doctorate (Dr.-Ing.). His dissertation titled "Lightweight composites made of aluminium foam with thermally sprayed coatings" won him several scientific prizes. After completing his doctorate, Maurer undertook a long-term trip around the world. In 2006, Maurer successfully completed an additional course of study in economics at the University of Hagen with an MBA management degree.

Maurer holds several patents in the field of materials science and materials engineering. He is fluent in four languages (German, English, Spanish, French) and as part of his astronaut training, he is also taking intensive language training in Russian and Chinese.

== Astronaut career ==
Maurer applied to the European Space Agency as an astronaut in 2008 with almost 8500 other candidates and was one of ten to pass the selection procedure, but was not initially appointed to the European Astronaut Corps. In 2010 he started working for the European Space Agency as a crew support engineer and eurocom for the Columbus flight control team at the European Astronaut Centre (EAC) in Cologne, Germany. Before he formally joined the European Astronaut Corps in July 2015, Maurer took a lead role in ESA Astronaut Centre projects to prepare for future spaceflight and lunar operations with new international partners and extend the Agency's human exploration expertise beyond the International Space Station.

In 2014, he took part in the ESA Cooperative Adventure for Valuing and Exercising Human Behaviour and Performance Skills program and in 2016 he was part of the NASA Extreme Environment Mission Operations 21 analog mission, an underwater training programme for future ISS crews in Florida as well as the first ESA PANGAEA mission, a field geology and astrobiology training programme by the European Space Agency. In March 2018, he gained certification to perform International Space Station-related spacewalks in the American spacesuit EMU. In 2018 he also graduated from both basic astronaut training and pre-assignment training and thus became fully certified to go to space.

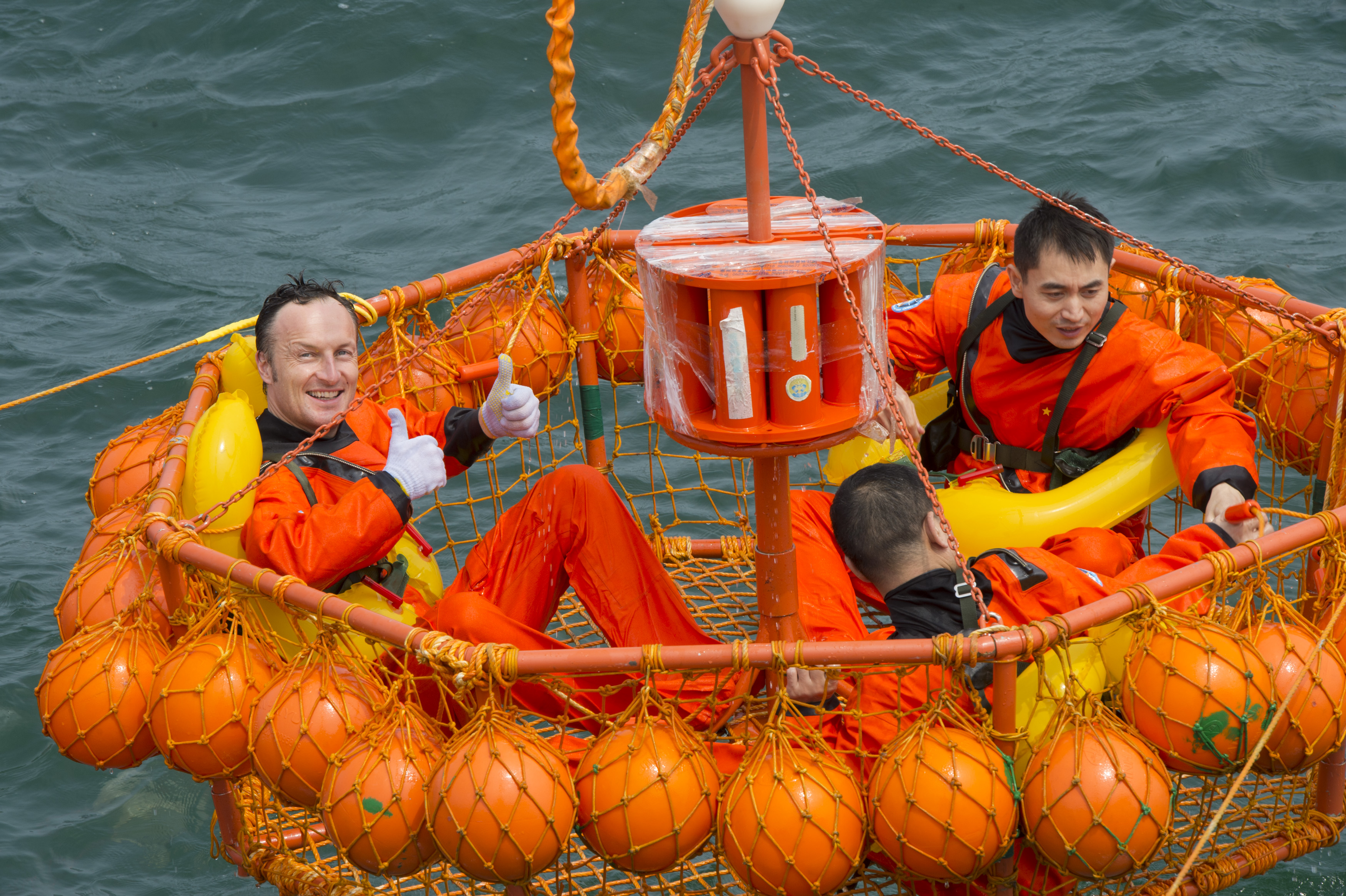
Matthias Maurer training in China

In 2017, the European Space Agency (ESA) started human spaceflight training with China Manned Space Agency, with the ultimate goal of sending ESA astronauts to Tiangong space station. To prepare for the future missions, Matthias Maurer and other selected ESA astronauts lived together with their Chinese counterparts and engaged in training sessions such as splashes-down survival, language learning, and Shenzhou spacecraft operations. However, in January 2023, ESA announced that the agency will not send its astronauts to China's space station due to political and financial reasons.

On 12 May 2020 he arrived at the Johnson Space Center in Texas alongside ESA astronaut Thomas Pesquet and Russian cosmonauts Sergey Ryzhikov, Sergey Kud-Sverchkov, Oleg Novitsky and Pyotr Dubrov for training amidst the COVID-19 pandemic.

=== Expedition 66/67 ===
On 28 July 2020, Maurer was announced as a backup crew member for Thomas Pesquet on SpaceX Crew-2. On 14 December 2020, ESA announced a competition to name Maurer's mission; the winner would be announced in summer 2020 and will receive a signed mission patch flown to the ISS by Matthias. Prior to his mission assignment, Matthias was based at ESA’s Astronaut Centre in Cologne, Germany where he was project managing the development of a new ESA Moon simulation facility known as Luna.

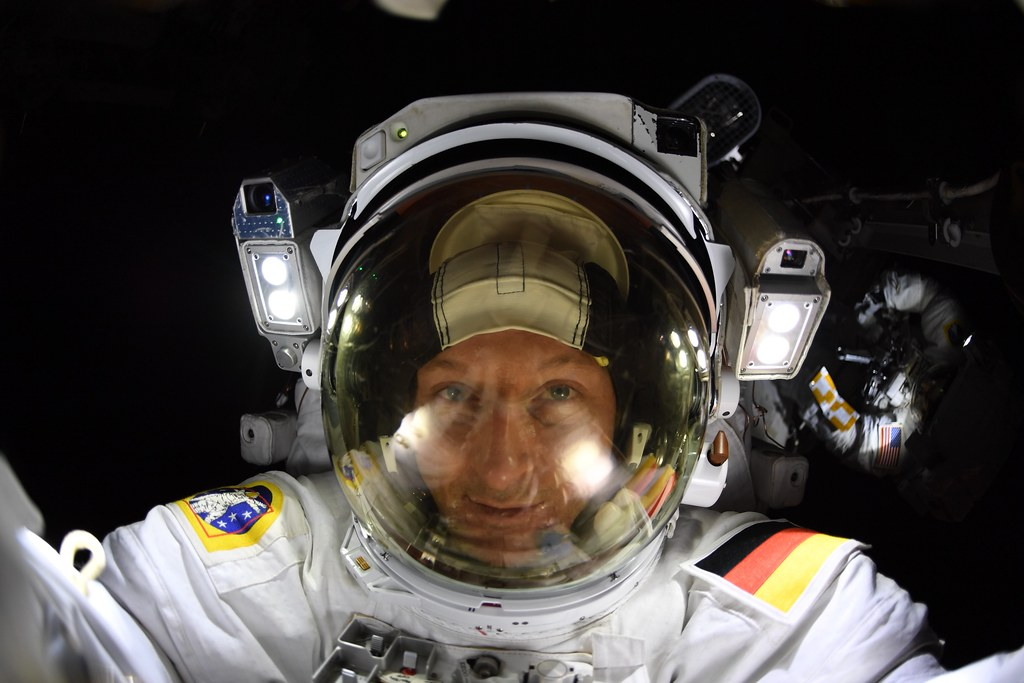
Image taken during ESA astronaut Matthias Maurer's first spacewalk, EVA 80. He posted it to his social media on 5 April 2022.

On 14 December 2020, Maurer was officially assigned to the SpaceX Crew-3 mission, which launched on 10 November 2021. A few hours before the announcement, Maurer revealed his second mission name as Cosmic Kiss, after the Nebra sky disk, the oldest known realistic illustration of the night sky. He traveled to the International Space Station alongside NASA astronauts Raja Chari, who commanded the Crew Dragon, Thomas Marshburn, as the pilot, and mission specialist Kayla Barron. Once on board the station, they joined Expedition 66. This mission made him the twelfth German astronaut after Alexander Gerst in 2018.

As part of Expedition 66, Maurer and Chari installed ammonia jumpers on the P1 Truss and repositioned a radiator beam valve module which had been giving them trouble returning the unit to operation. The astronauts routed cables, installed cable clamps on the Bartolomeo platform, tied back thermal insulation on the Kibo Exposed Facility Berthing Mechanism, replaced Camera 8 on the truss which has a bad filter and light, outfitted the radiator grapple bars for a future spacewalk, and also did other maintenance task outside the station. Because of time the task to break torque on the P4 electronics boxes was moved to a later spacewalk along with the truss cable routing.

Crew-3 landed in the Gulf of Mexico on 6 May 2022 after 177 days in space. For this expedition, Maurer along with the other crewmembers were awarded the NASA Distinguished Public Service Medal and the Space Exploration Medal.
