= Robb Kulin =

American aerospace engineer

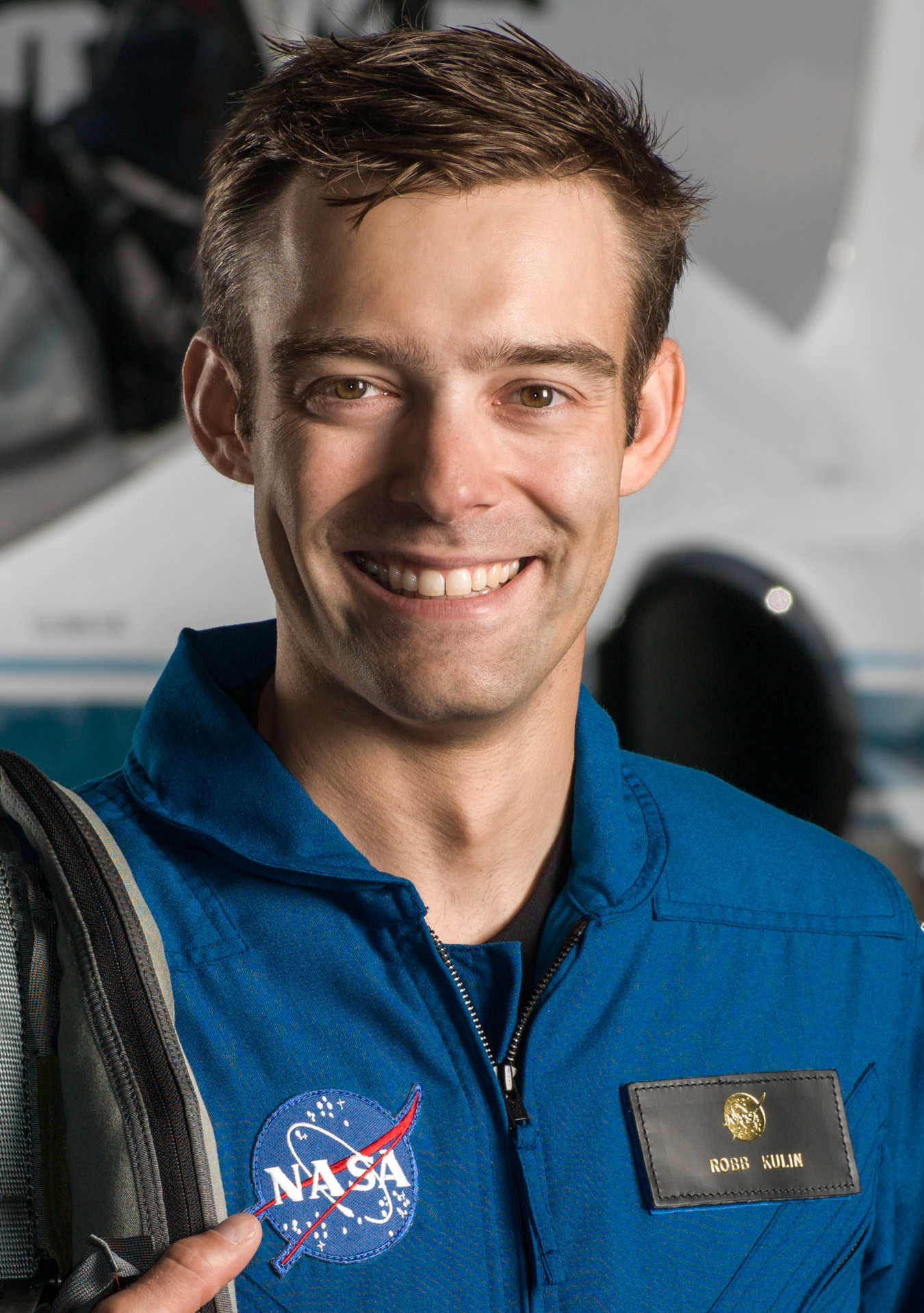
- NASA portrait, 2017
- Born: Robb Michael Kulin; December 7, 1983 (age 42); Anchorage, Alaska, U.S.
- Education: University of Denver (BS); University of California, San Diego (MS, PhD)
- Space career

NASA astronaut candidate
- Selection: NASA Group 22 (2017)
- Retired: August 31, 2018
- Scientific career
- Fields: Materials science
- Thesis: On the Dynamic Behavior of Mineralized Tissues (2010)

Robb Michael Kulin (born December 7, 1983) is an American aerospace engineer, entrepreneur, and former NASA astronaut candidate. He was a member of NASA Astronaut Group 22 but resigned before completing astronaut training.

== Personal life ==
Robb Kulin was born and grew up in Anchorage, Alaska.

== Education ==
He studied mechanical engineering as an undergraduate at the University of Denver, earned a master's degree in materials science, and Ph.D. in engineering, both at the University of California, San Diego. For his doctorate studies, he focused on dynamic bone fracture. Prior to starting the doctoral program, Kulin was a Fulbright Fellow for one year at the Politecnico di Milano.

== Career ==
He worked as a commercial fisherman in Chignik, Alaska, and was previously an ice driller in Antarctica on the West Antarctic Ice Sheet and Taylor Glacier.

At the time of his selection as astronaut candidate in June 2017, Kulin was senior manager for flight reliability at SpaceX, leading the Launch Chief Engineering group in Hawthorne, California, where he had worked since 2011.

In August 2018, Kulin became the first NASA astronaut candidate in fifty years to resign prior to completing the initial training program. He cited "personal reasons" for resigning from the program.

Kulin joined Firefly Aerospace in April 2019 as Director of Engineering for its Alpha small satellite launch vehicle and later was COO.
