= SpaceX Crew-4 =

2022 American crewed spaceflight to the ISS and maiden flight of Crew Dragon Freedom

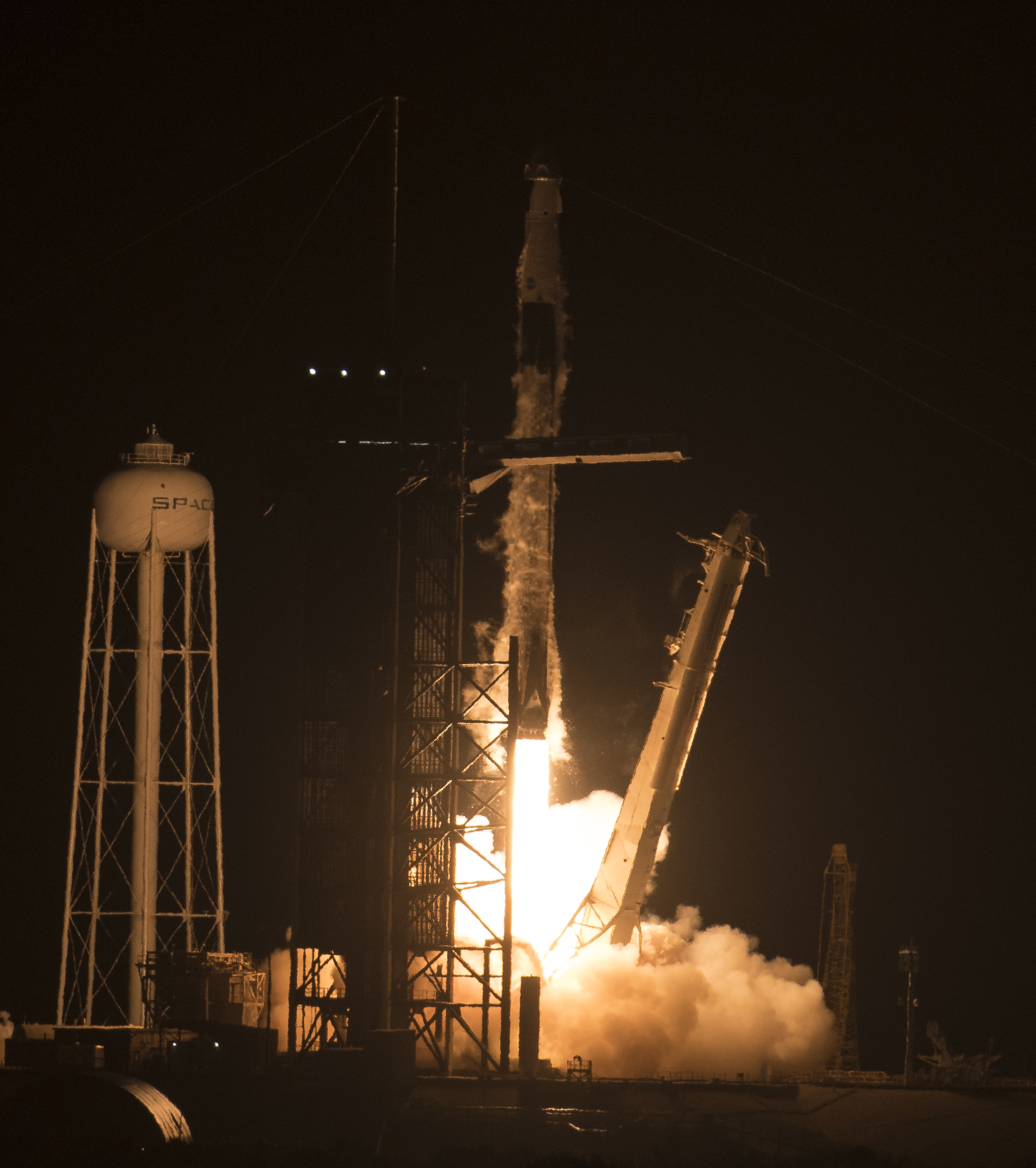
- Freedom launches to the ISS with the crew members of Crew-4 onboard.
- Names: USCV-4
- Mission type: ISS crew transport
- Operator: SpaceX
- COSPAR ID: 2022-042A
- SATCAT no.: 52318
- Mission duration: 170 days, 13 hours, 2 minutes, 32 seconds

Spacecraft properties
- Spacecraft: Crew Dragon Freedom
- Spacecraft type: Crew Dragon
- Manufacturer: SpaceX
- Launch mass: 12,519 kg (27,600 lb)
- Landing mass: 9,616 kg (21,200 lb)

Crew
- Crew size: 4
- Members: Kjell Lindgren; Robert Hines; Samantha Cristoforetti; Jessica Watkins
- Expedition: Expedition 67/68

Start of mission
- Launch date: April 27, 2022, 07:52:55 UTC (3:52:55 am EDT)
- Rocket: Falcon 9 Block 5 B1067-4
- Launch site: Kennedy, LC‑39A

End of mission
- Recovered by: MV Megan
- Landing date: October 14, 2022, 20:55:27 UTC (4:55:27 pm EDT)
- Landing site: Atlantic Ocean, near Jacksonville, Florida

Orbital parameters
- Reference system: Geocentric orbit
- Regime: Low Earth orbit
- Inclination: 51.64°

Docking with ISS
- Docking port: Harmony zenith
- Docking date: April 27, 2022, 23:37 UTC
- Undocking date: October 14, 2022, 16:05 UTC
- Time docked: 169 days, 16 hours, 28 minutes
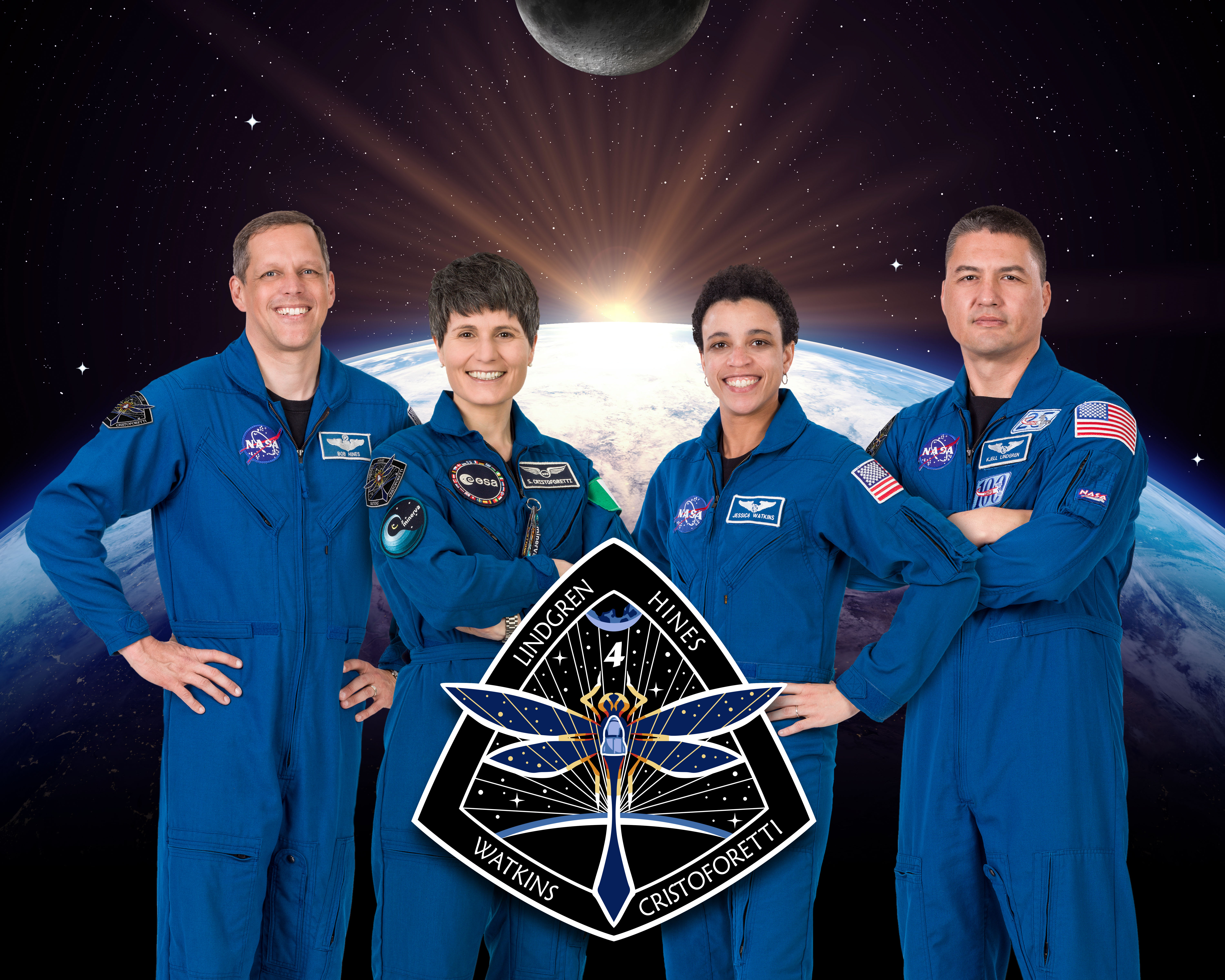
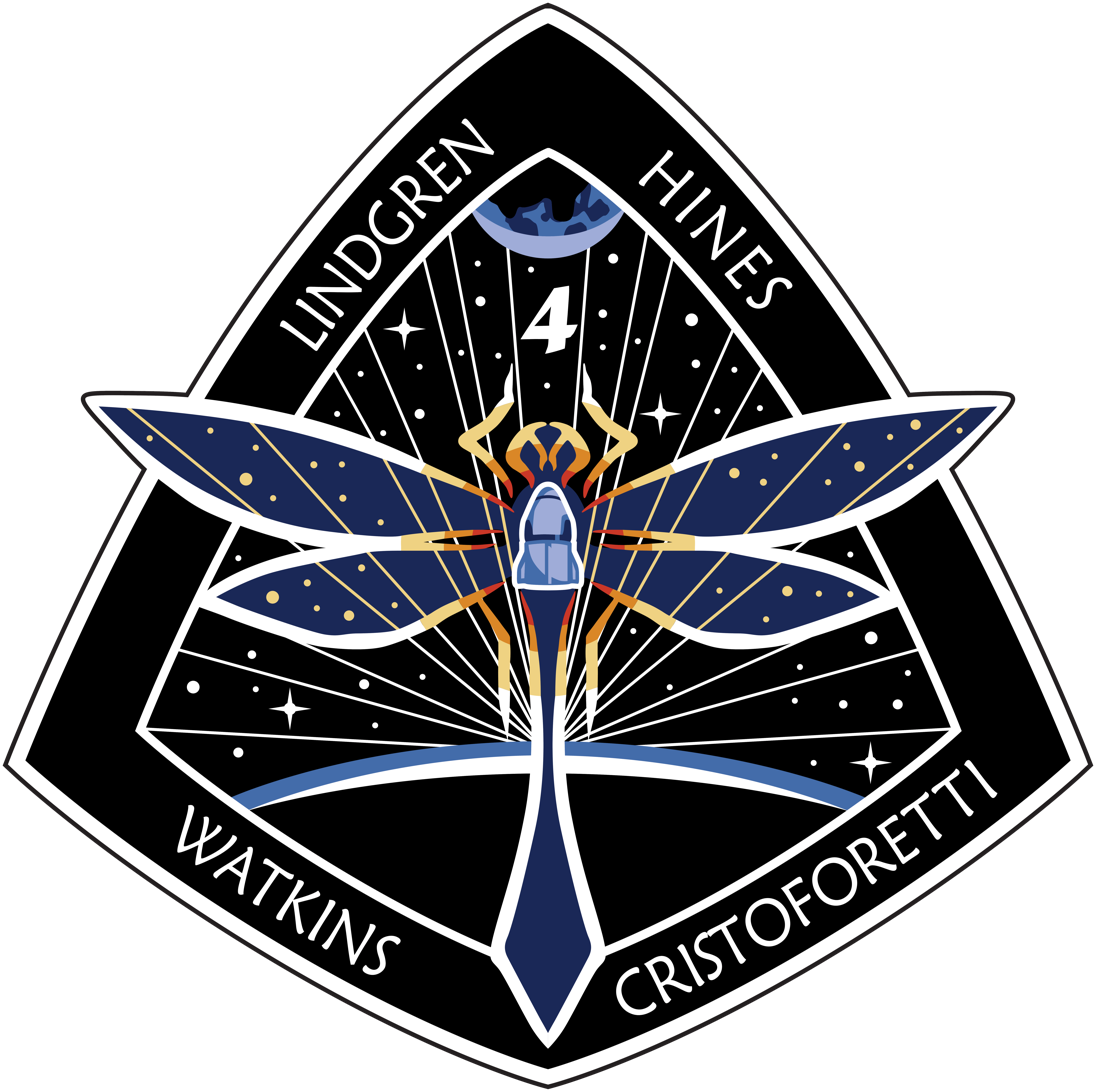
- NASA (left), SpaceX (middle), and ESA (right) mission patches From left: Hines, Cristoforetti, Watkins and Lindgren Commercial Crew Program Crew Dragon flights

SpaceX Crew-4 was the Crew Dragon's fourth NASA Commercial Crew operational flight, and its seventh overall crewed orbital flight. The mission launched on April 27, 2022, at 07:52 UTC before docking with the International Space Station (ISS) at 23:37 UTC. It followed shortly after the private Axiom 1 mission to the ISS earlier in the month utilizing SpaceX hardware. Three American (NASA) astronauts and one European (ESA) astronaut were on board the mission.

Crew-4 was the maiden flight of the Crew Dragon spacecraft named Freedom, named such by the crew because it "celebrates a fundamental human right, and the industry and innovation that emanate from the unencumbered human spirit". The booster used on this mission was the B1067, which makes it the first Commercial Crew mission to use a booster on its fourth flight (it previously was used to launch SpaceX Crew-3 in 2021).

== Crew ==
NASA astronauts Kjell Lindgren and Robert Hines were announced on February 12, 2021, to the crew. Samantha Cristoforetti was named the commander of Expedition 68 on May 28, 2021. Jessica Watkins was named mission specialist on November 16, 2021. Cristoforetti was later removed as commander of Expedition 68 due to the shortening of the Crew-4 mission.

Prime crew
Position	Astronaut
Commander	Kjell N. Lindgren, NASA; Expedition 67/68; Second spaceflight
Pilot	Robert Hines, NASA; Expedition 67/68; First spaceflight
Mission specialist	Samantha Cristoforetti, ESA; Expedition 67/68; Second spaceflight
Mission specialist	Jessica Watkins, NASA; Expedition 67/68; First spaceflight

Backup crew
Position	Astronaut
Commander	Steve Bowen, NASA

== Mission ==
The mission duration was 170 days. The European part of the mission was called Minerva, named after the Roman goddess of wisdom, and it was European astronaut Cristoforetti's second mission to the ISS.

== Gallery ==
SpaceX Crew-4
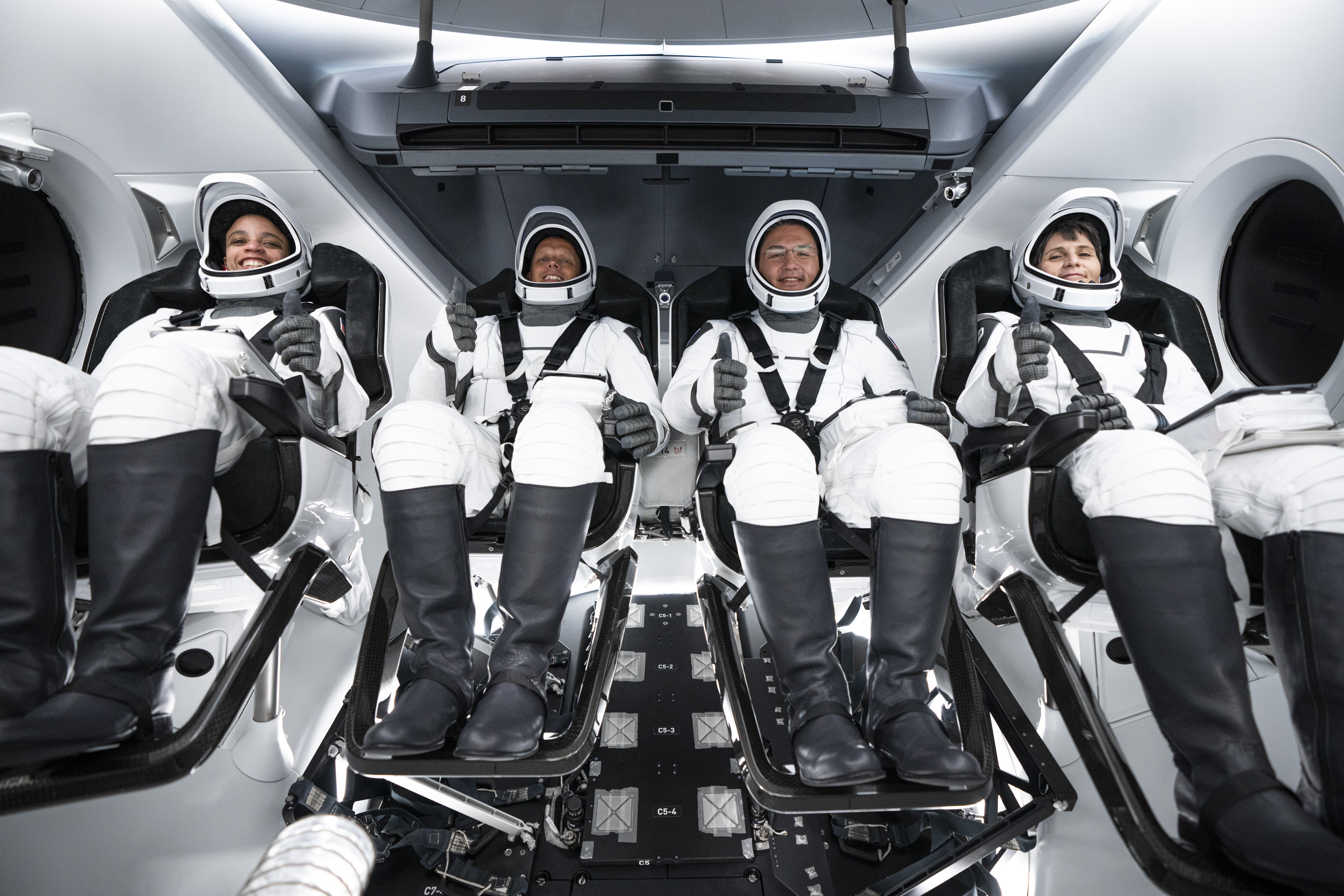
Crew-4 astronauts before flight

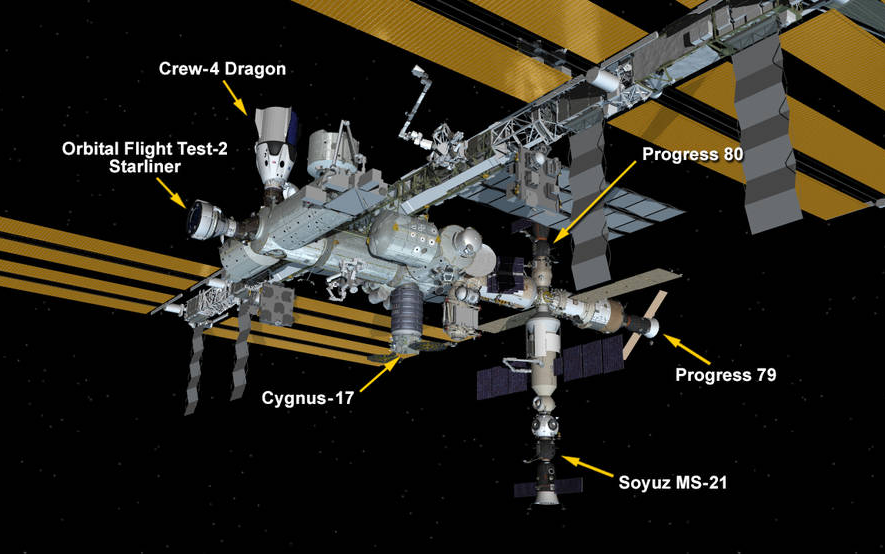
ISS configuration during Crew-4

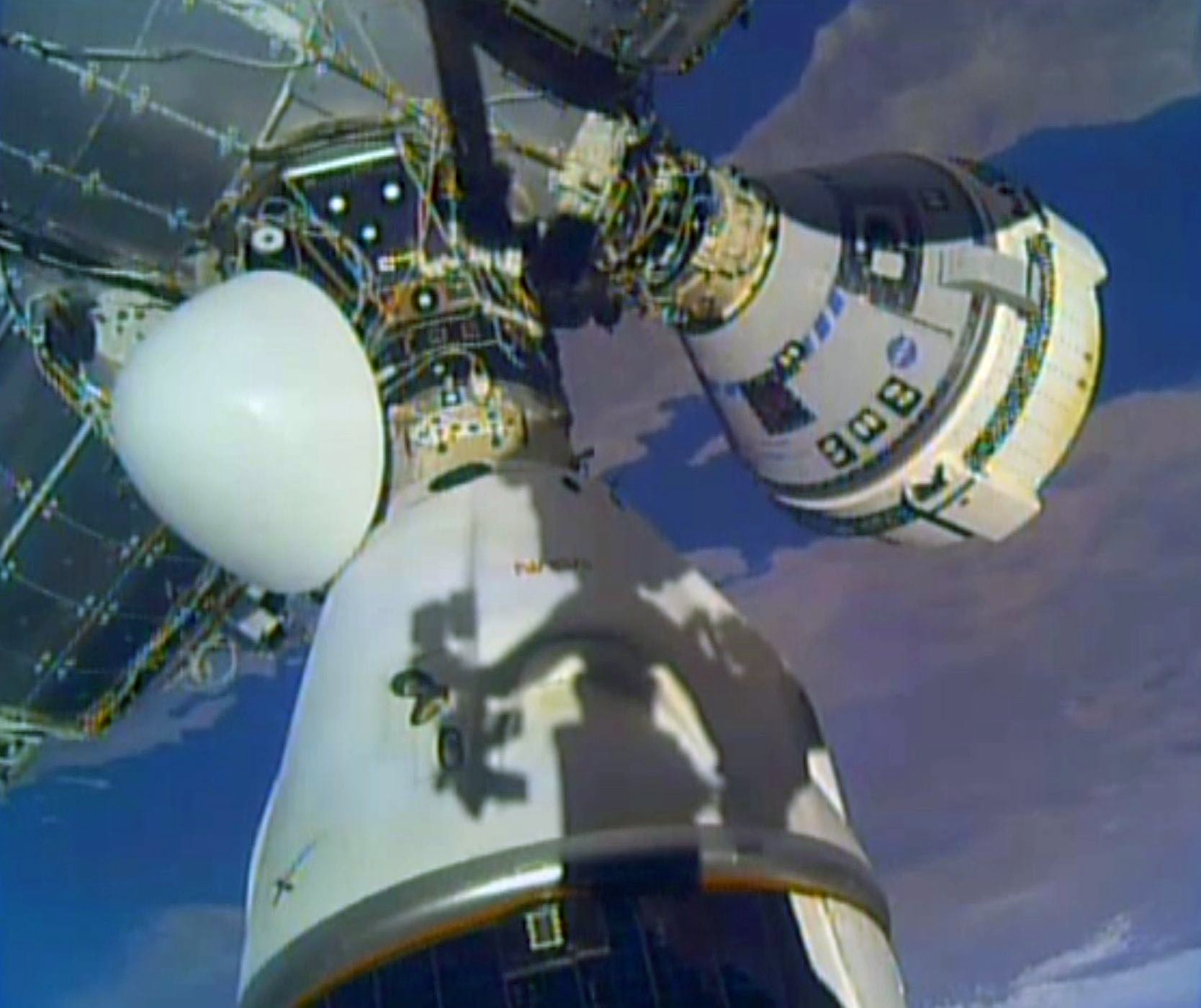
Crew-4 and Starliner OFT-2 docked to the ISS

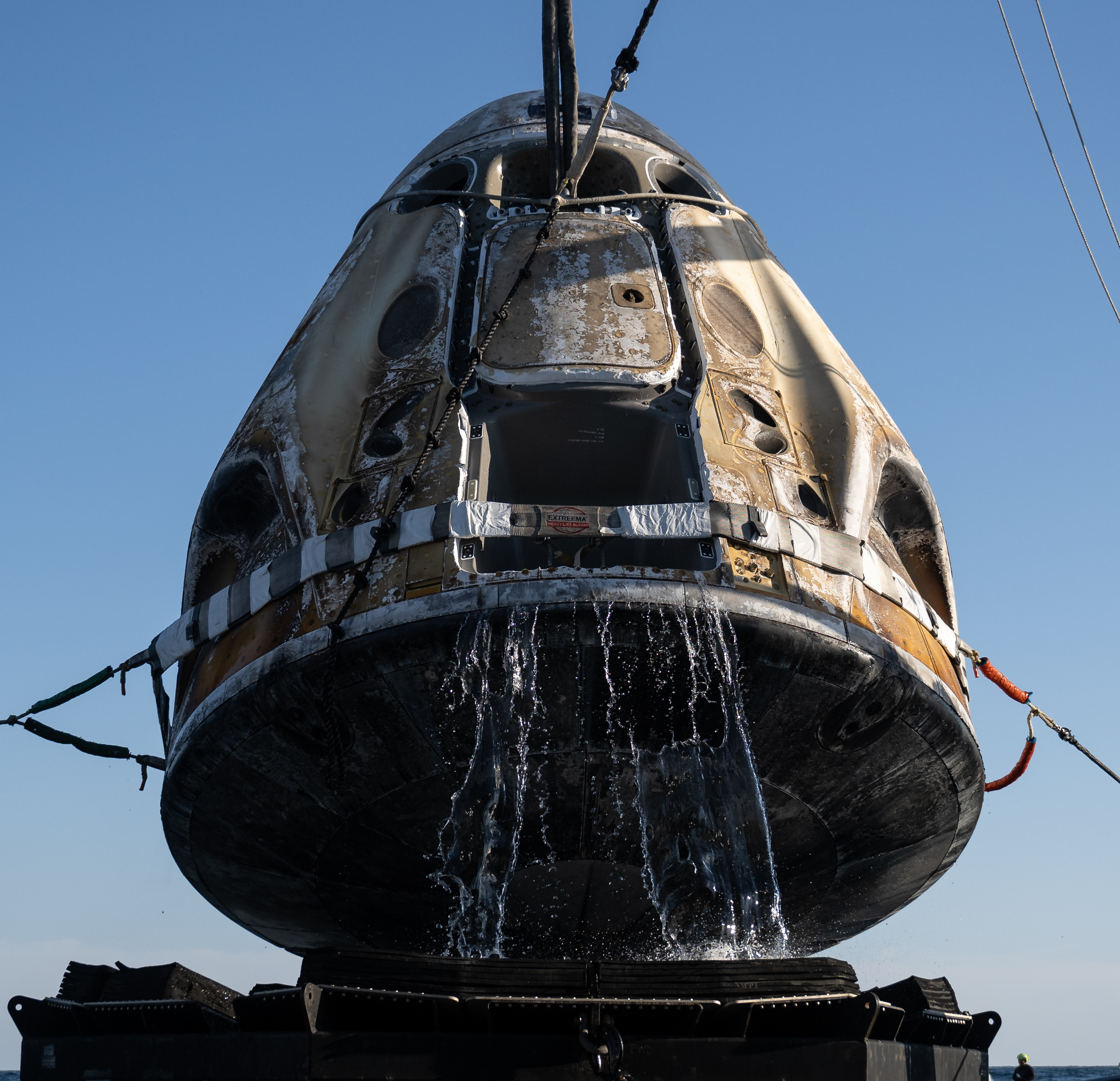
Freedom after reentry and splashdown

== See also ==
- Dragon C206 Endeavour
- Dragon C207 Resilience
- Boeing Starliner
