= Raja Chari =

American astronaut (born 1977)

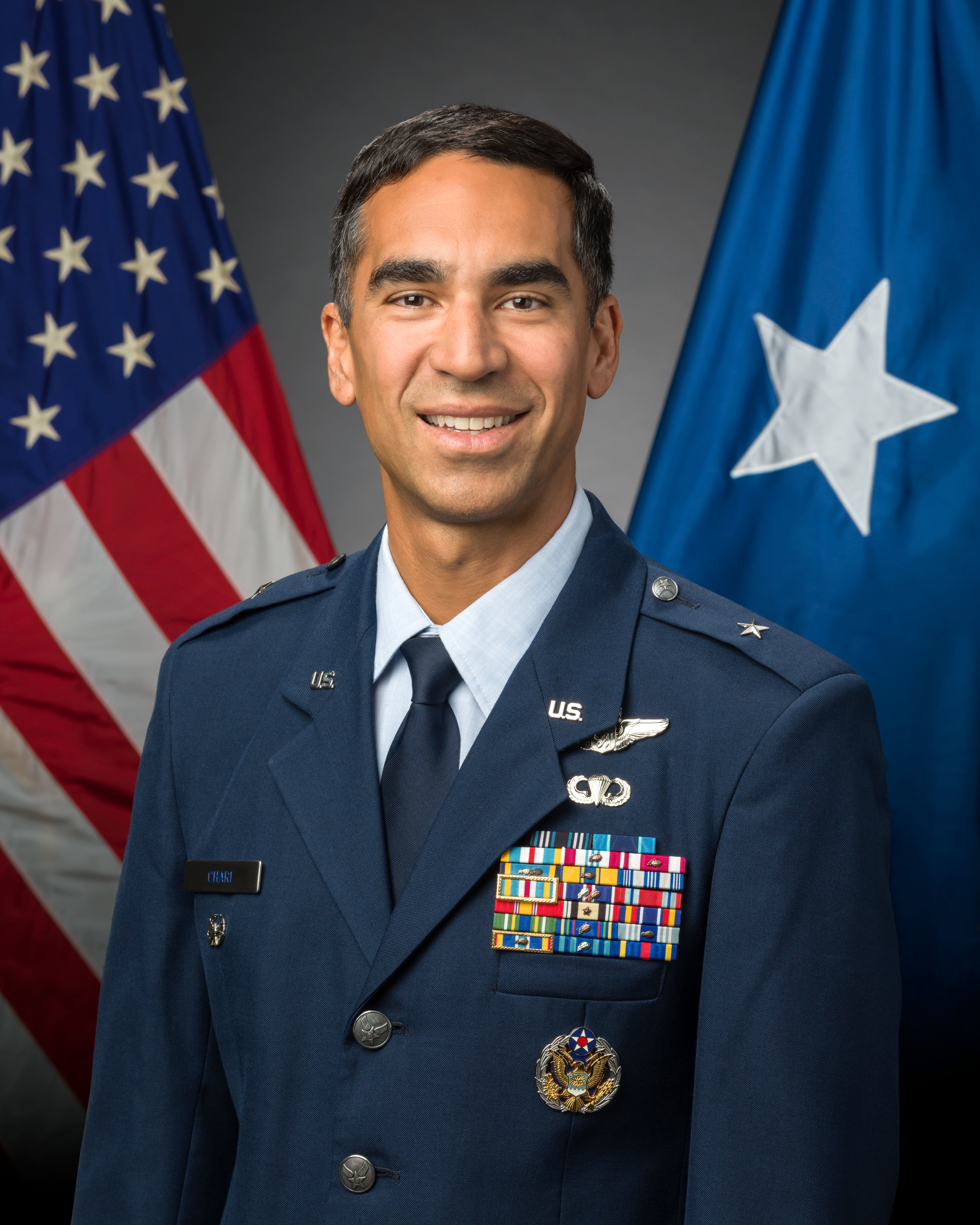
- Official portrait, 2024
- Born: Raja Jon Vurputoor Chari; June 24, 1977 (age 49); Milwaukee, Wisconsin, U.S.
- Education: United States Air Force Academy (BS); Massachusetts Institute of Technology (MS)
- Space career

NASA astronaut
- Rank: Brigadier General, USAF
- Time in space: 176 days, 2 hours, 39 minutes
- Selection: NASA Group 22 (2017)
- Total EVAs: 2
- Total EVA time: 13h 48m
- Missions: SpaceX Crew-3 (Expedition 66/67)
- Mission insignia

Raja Jon Vurputoor Chari (born June 24, 1977) is an American test pilot and NASA astronaut. He is a graduate of the United States Air Force Academy, Massachusetts Institute of Technology, and U.S. Naval Test Pilot School, and has over 2,000 flying hours. He is a brigadier general in the United States Air Force. He is the first Indian-American Man in space.

== Early life and education ==
Chari was born in Milwaukee, Wisconsin, to Peggy Egbert and Sreenivas V. Chari, a Telugu from India. He was raised in Cedar Falls, Iowa, and attended Columbus High School, graduating in 1995. He attended the United States Air Force Academy in Colorado Springs, Colorado, and graduated in 1999 with a Bachelor of Science in astronautical engineering and engineering science, with a minor in mathematics. Following his graduation, Chari attended the Massachusetts Institute of Technology in Cambridge, Massachusetts as a Draper Fellow, earning a Master of Science in aeronautical and astronautical engineering in 2001.

== Air Force career ==
After earning his graduate degree in 2001, Chari attended Undergraduate Pilot Training at Vance Air Force Base, Oklahoma. He then attended F-15E Strike Eagle training at Seymour Johnson Air Force Base, North Carolina and, following completion of the training syllabus, subsequently served as an F-15E Evaluator Pilot and Chief of Standardization and Evaluation with the 90th Fighter Squadron at Elmendorf AFB, Alaska and 494th Fighter Squadron at RAF Lakenheath, England, deploying in support of Operation Iraqi Freedom.

In 2007, Chari attended the U.S. Naval Test Pilot School at NAS Patuxent River, Maryland as an Air Force exchange officer, and, following graduation a year later, was assigned to the 40th Flight Test Squadron at Eglin AFB, Florida, where he served as the project pilot for the APG-63 and APG-82 Active Electronically Scanned Array radar programs. Chari also attended the U.S. Army Command and General Staff College in Fort Leavenworth, Kansas, and was a program manager for a major defense acquisition program in the Air Force's Rapid Capabilities Office. At the time of his selection as an Astronaut in June 2017, Chari was serving as commanding officer of the 461st Flight Test Squadron at Edwards AFB, California.

In January 2023, Chari was nominated for promotion to brigadier general.

== NASA career ==
In June 2017, Chari was selected for NASA Astronaut Group 22, and reported for duty in August to begin two years of training as an astronaut.

In December 2020, Chari was selected as part of the Artemis team, a group of astronauts "to help pave the way for the next lunar missions including sending the first woman and next man to walk on the lunar surface in 2024." The same month, he became the first astronaut from Group 22 to be selected for a space mission, SpaceX Crew-3, which he commanded. Chari is the first NASA rookie to command a spaceflight since Joe Engle, who commanded the STS-2 mission in 1981.

On March 23, 2022, Chari and ESA astronaut Matthias Maurer exited the Quest Joint Airlock on the ISS to perform an EVA. However, Maurer's helmet camera became loose, delaying the start of the activities by an hour. Chari ultimately secured it using wire, and the spacewalk was completed successfully.

== Personal life ==
Chari is married to Holly Schaffter Chari, also a Cedar Falls native, and the couple have three children.

== Awards and honors ==
During his Air Force career, Chari was awarded the Defense Meritorious Service Medal, the Meritorious Service Medal, the Aerial Achievement Medal, the Air Force Commendation Medal, the Air Force Achievement Medal, the Iraq Campaign Medal, the Korean Defense Service Medal, and the Nuclear Deterrence Operations Service Medal. Chari is an Eagle Scout, and was a distinguished graduate from the U.S. Air Force Academy and Undergraduate Pilot Training.
