= SpaceX Crew-3 =

2021 American crewed spaceflight to the ISS and maiden flight of Crew Dragon Endurance

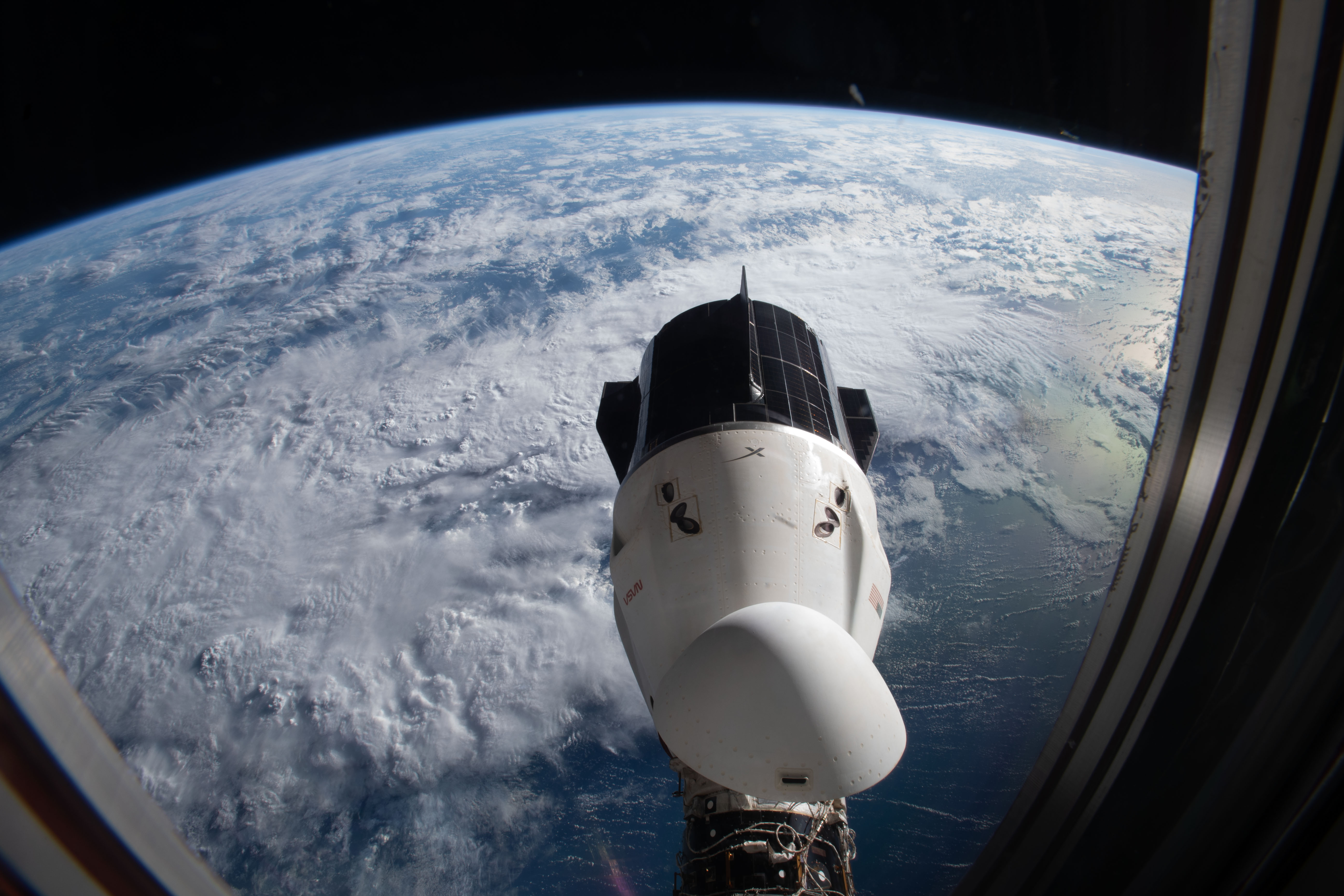
- Endurance docked at the ISS
- Names: USCV-3
- Mission type: ISS crew transport
- Operator: SpaceX
- COSPAR ID: 2021-103A
- SATCAT no.: 49407
- Mission duration: 176 days, 2 hours, 39 minutes, 52 seconds

Spacecraft properties
- Spacecraft: Crew Dragon Endurance
- Spacecraft type: Crew Dragon
- Manufacturer: SpaceX
- Launch mass: 12,055 kg (26,577 lb)

Crew
- Crew size: 4
- Members: Raja Chari; Thomas Marshburn; Kayla Barron; Matthias Maurer
- Expedition: Expedition 66/67

Start of mission
- Launch date: November 11, 2021, 02:03:31 UTC (November 10, 9:03:31 pm EDT)
- Rocket: Falcon 9 Block 5 B1067-2
- Launch site: Kennedy, LC‑39A

End of mission
- Recovered by: MV Shannon
- Landing date: May 6, 2022, 04:43:23 UTC (12:43:23 am EDT)
- Landing site: Gulf of Mexico, near Clearwater, Florida

Orbital parameters
- Reference system: Geocentric orbit
- Regime: Low Earth orbit
- Inclination: 51.66°

Docking with ISS
- Docking port: Harmony forward
- Docking date: November 11, 2021, 23:32 UTC
- Undocking date: May 5, 2022, 05:20 UTC
- Time docked: 174 days, 5 hours, 48 minutes
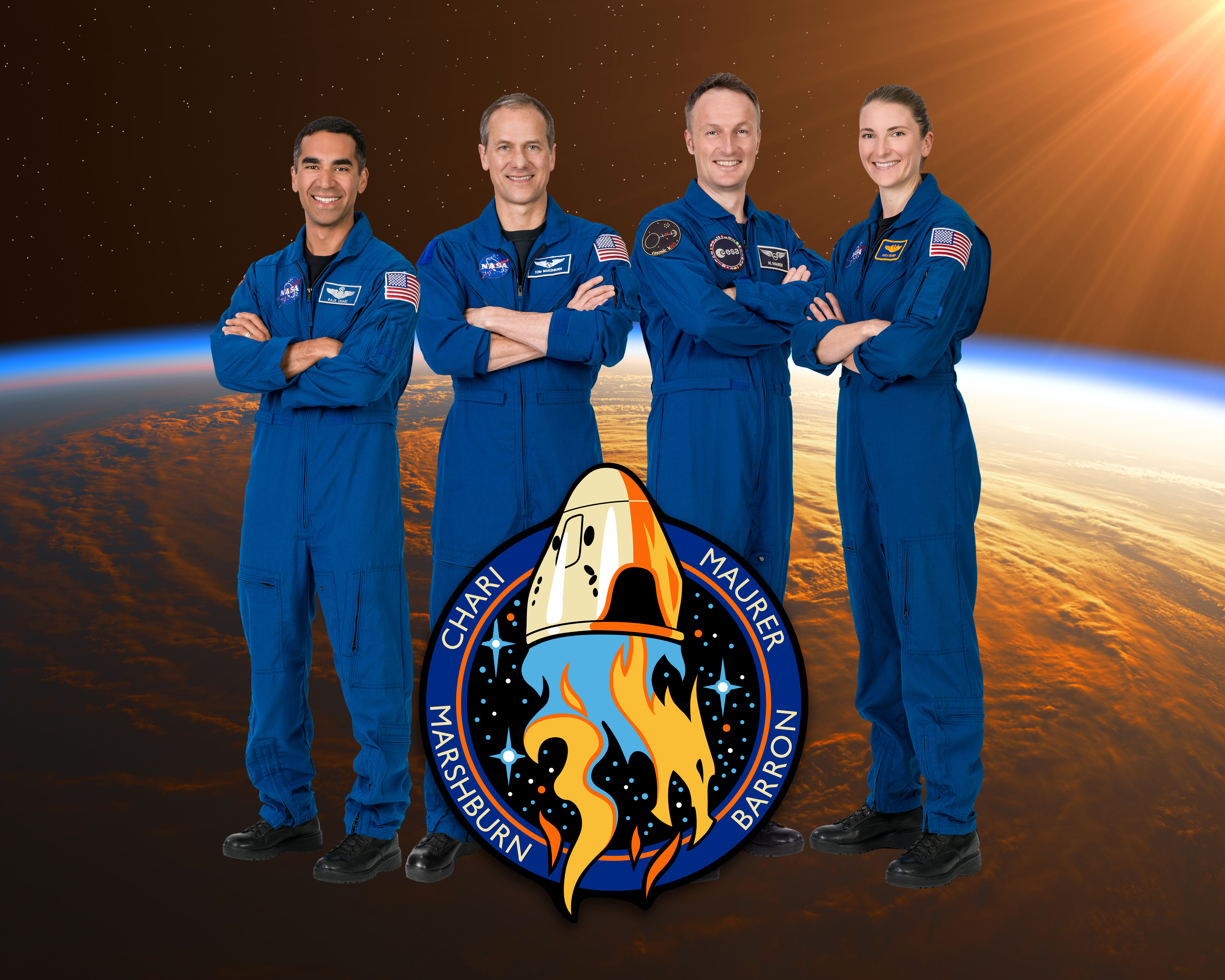
- NASA (left), SpaceX (middle), and ESA (right) mission patches From left: Chari, Marshburn, Maurer and Barron Commercial Crew Program Crew Dragon flights

SpaceX Crew-3 was the Crew Dragon's third NASA Commercial Crew operational flight, and its fifth overall crewed orbital flight. The mission successfully launched on November 11, 2021, at 02:03:31 UTC to the International Space Station. It was the maiden flight of Crew Dragon Endurance.

This launch brought the total number of humans who have been to space to more than 600 with Maurer (600) and Barron (601).

== Name ==
Crew Dragon capsules have been given names by their initial crews — Endeavour for the first, and Resilience for the second. On October 7, 2021, it was announced that the third capsule will be called Endurance. The name honors the SpaceX and NASA teams that endured through a pandemic, building the spacecraft and training the astronauts who flew it. The name also honors Endurance, the ship used by Shackleton's Imperial Trans-Antarctic Expedition. The three-masted vessel sank in 1915 after being bound in ice before reaching Antarctica.

== Crew ==
German ESA astronaut Matthias Maurer was selected first for the mission in September 2020. NASA astronauts Raja Chari and Thomas Marshburn were added on December 14, 2020, to the crew. The fourth seat was left open in anticipation that a Russian cosmonaut would take the seat, marking the beginning of a barter agreement that would see NASA and Roscosmos trade seats on the Soyuz and Commercial Crew Vehicles, although in April 2021 then-acting NASA administration Steve Jurczyk said that this agreement would be unlikely to start until after Crew-3 had launched. The fourth seat was assigned to Kayla Barron in May 2021.

Chari is the first rookie astronaut to command a NASA space mission since the Skylab 4 crew blasted off to the Skylab space station in 1973. Gerald Carr, who had not flown in space before, led a three-man crew on an 84-day flight on the Skylab. This was also the first spaceflight for Barron and Maurer.

Prime crew
Position	Astronaut
Commander	Raja Chari, NASA; Expedition 66/67; First spaceflight
Pilot	Thomas Marshburn, NASA; Expedition 66/67; Third and last spaceflight
Mission specialist	Kayla Barron, NASA; Expedition 66/67; First spaceflight
Mission specialist	Matthias Maurer, ESA; Expedition 66/67; First spaceflight

Backup crew
Position	Astronaut
Commander	Kjell N. Lindgren, NASA
Pilot	Robert Hines, NASA
Mission specialist	Samantha Cristoforetti, ESA
Mission specialist	Stephanie Wilson, NASA

The first astronauts of this NASA Astronaut Group 22 (nicknamed The Turtles) to fly to space, Raja Chari and Kayla Barron on SpaceX Crew-3 took a stuffed turtle as zero-g indicator to pay a tribute to their astronaut group. Additionally, to include the other crew members on board, Matthias Maurer and Tom Marshburn the turtle was named "Pfau", a German word meaning "Peacock" for Matthias Maurer, who is German, and for Tom Marshburn, who was part of NASA Astronaut Group 19 (nicknamed The Peacocks).

== Mission ==
The third SpaceX operational mission in the Commercial Crew Program was originally scheduled to launch on October 31, 2021. However, it was delayed to November 3, 2021, due to unfavorable weather in the Atlantic Ocean, and then further delayed to November 7, 2021, due to a minor medical issue with one of the astronauts. Due to expected bad weather, it was again delayed to November 9, 2021.

Due to the launch delays, NASA decided to return the astronauts from Crew-2 before Crew-3 launched, thus being the first Crew Dragon indirect handover of space station crews. SpaceX Crew-2 departed the station on November 8, 2021, and splashed down on November 9, 2021. SpaceX Crew-3 mission launched from Cape Canaveral on November 11, 2021, at 02:03:31 UTC.

The return of Crew-3 was delayed multiple times, from April 2022 to early May. Undocking happened on May 5 (05:20 UTC), with splashdown occurring the following day after spending 176 days in space.

The European segment of the mission is called "Cosmic Kiss".

== Gallery ==
SpaceX Crew-3
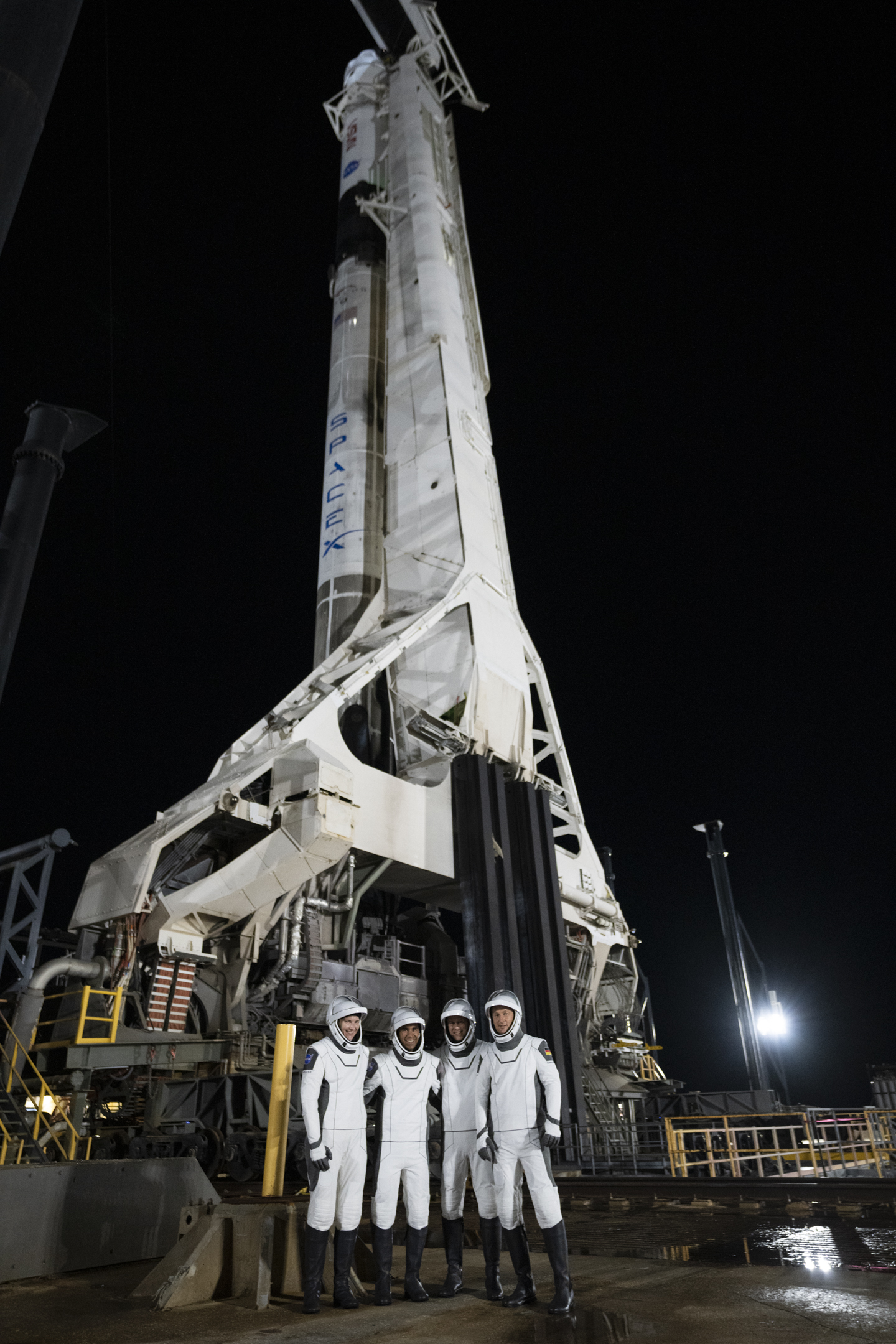
Crew-3 astronauts during dress rehearsals

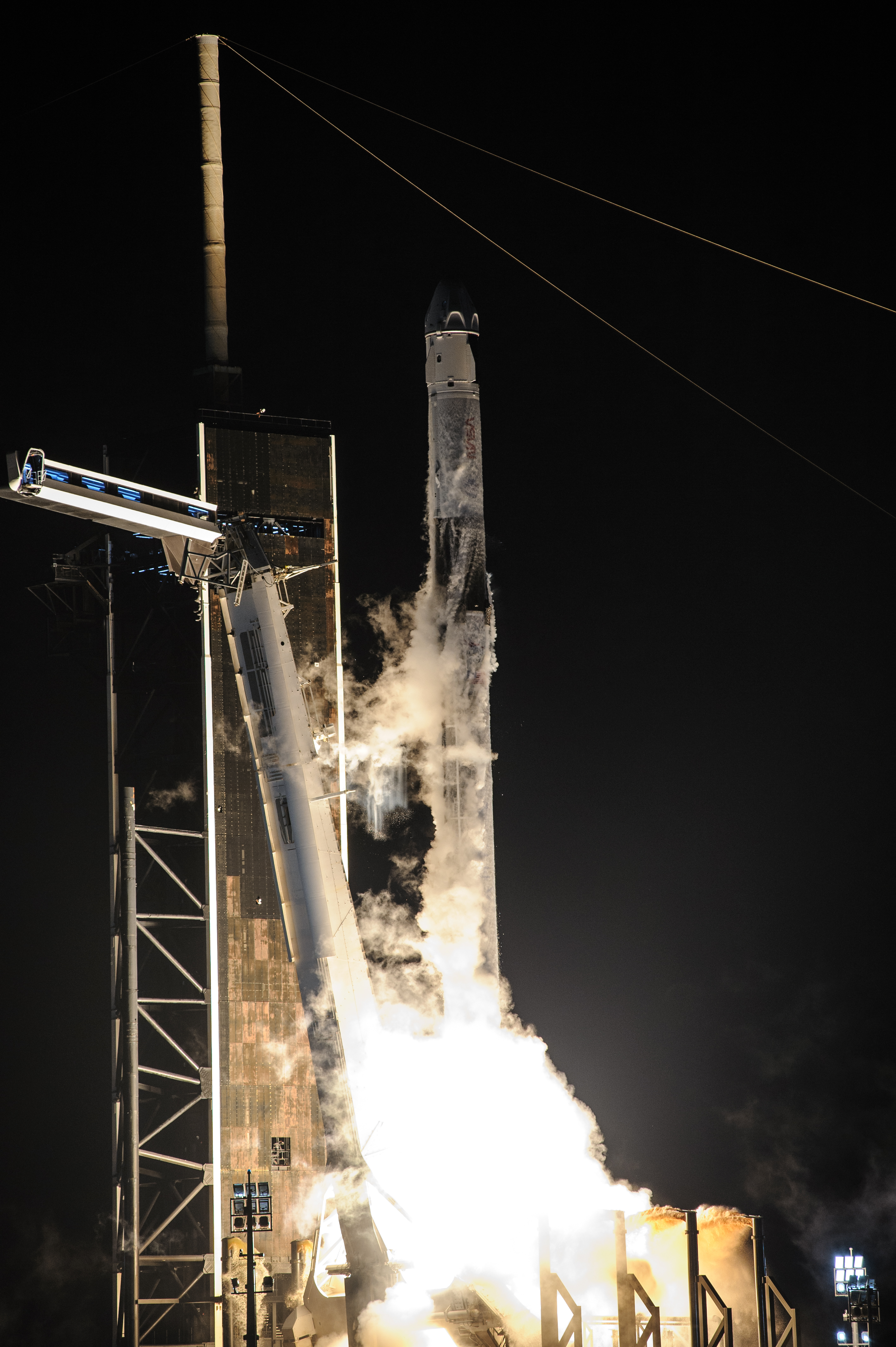
Launch of Crew-3

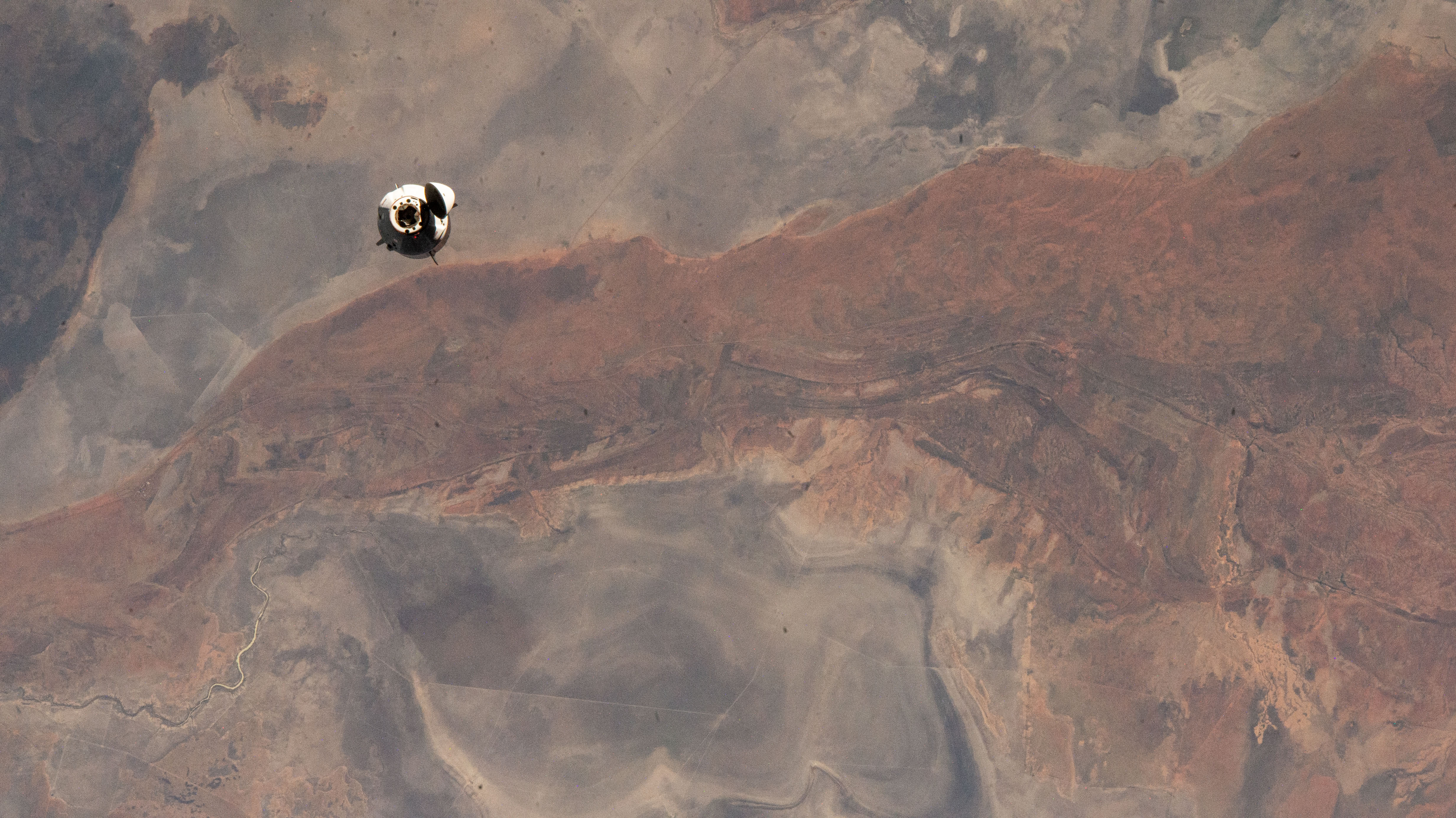
Crew Dragon Endurance approaches the ISS

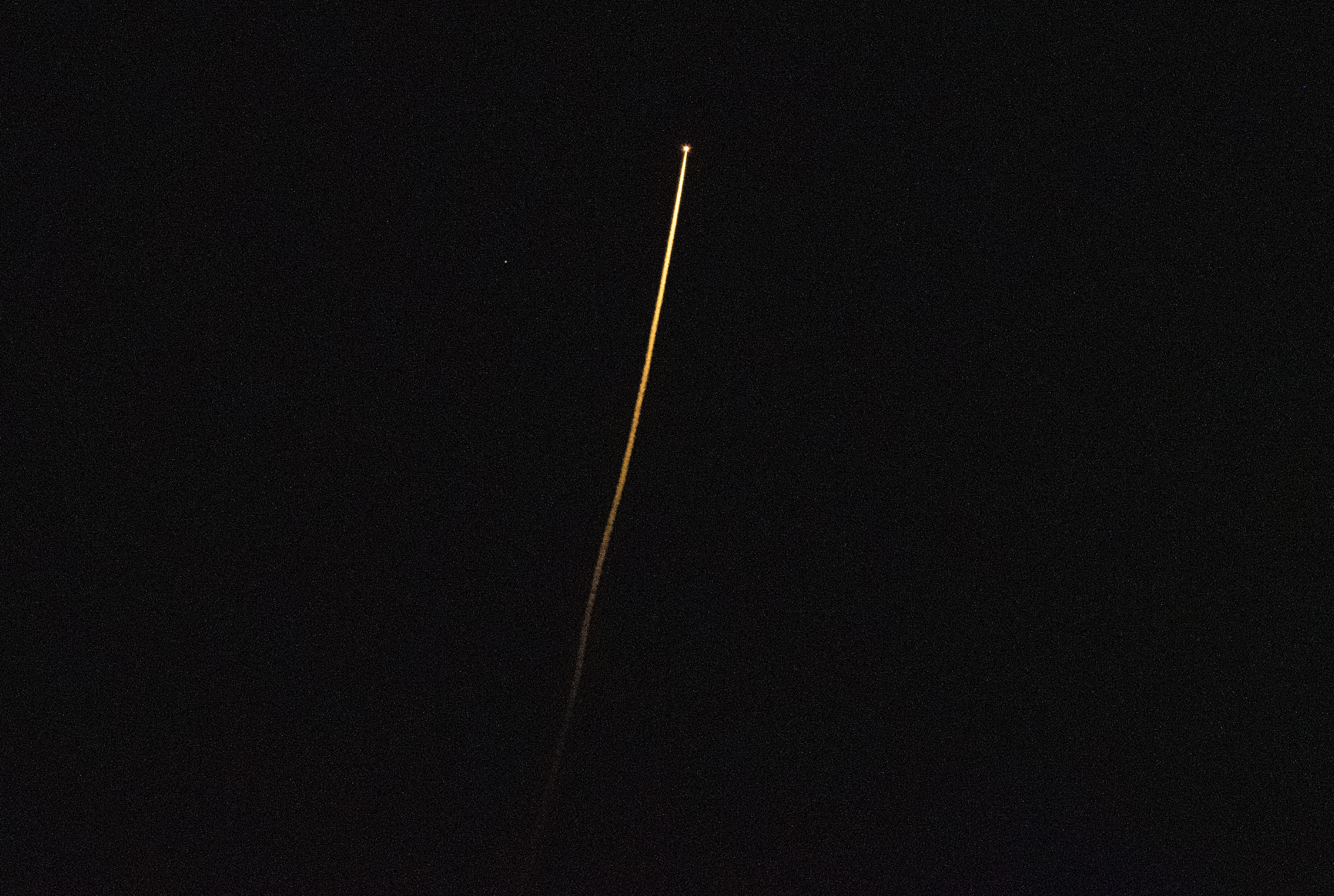
Crew-3 reenters the atmosphere

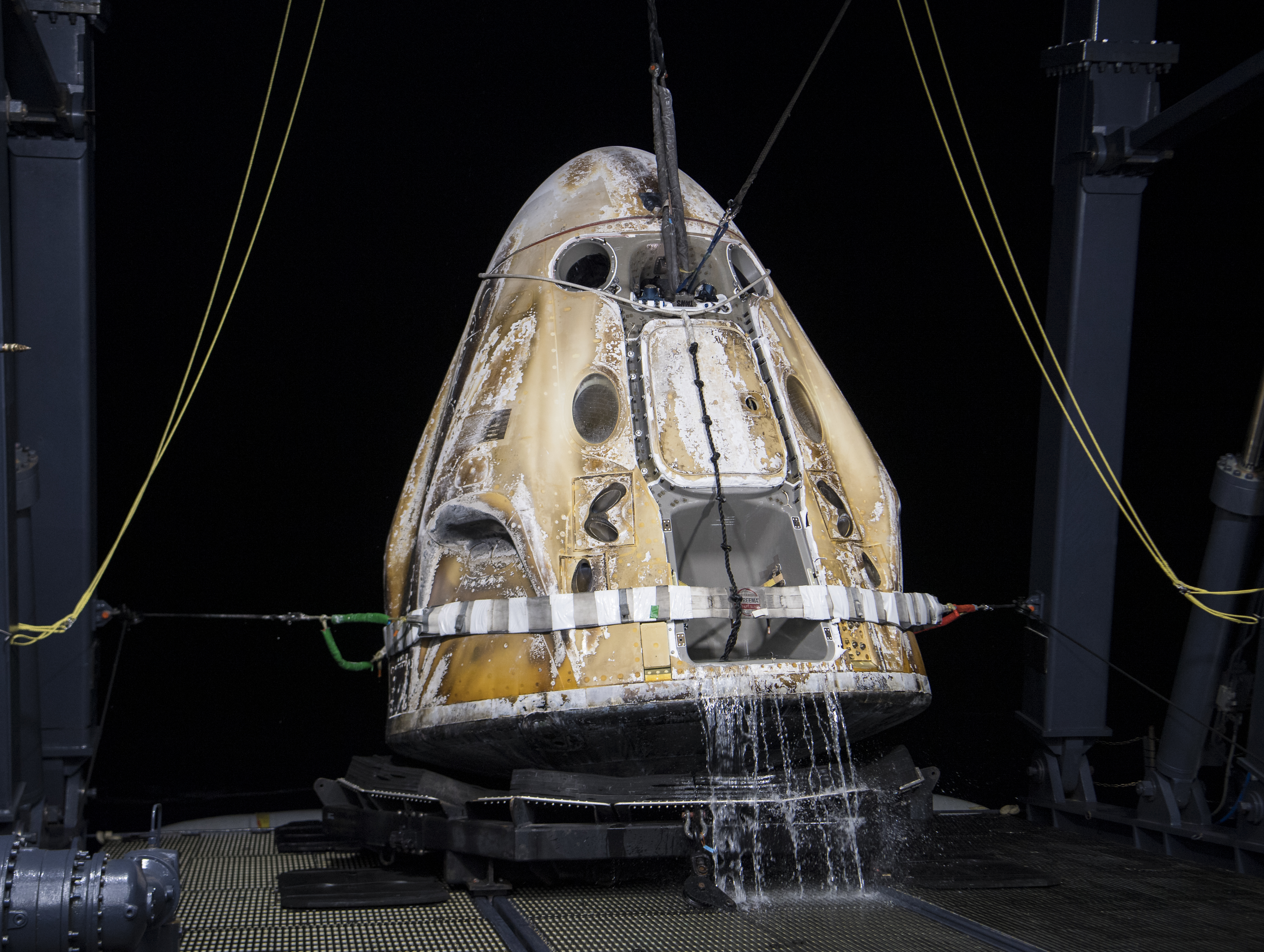
Crew Dragon Endurance on MV Shannon after splashdown

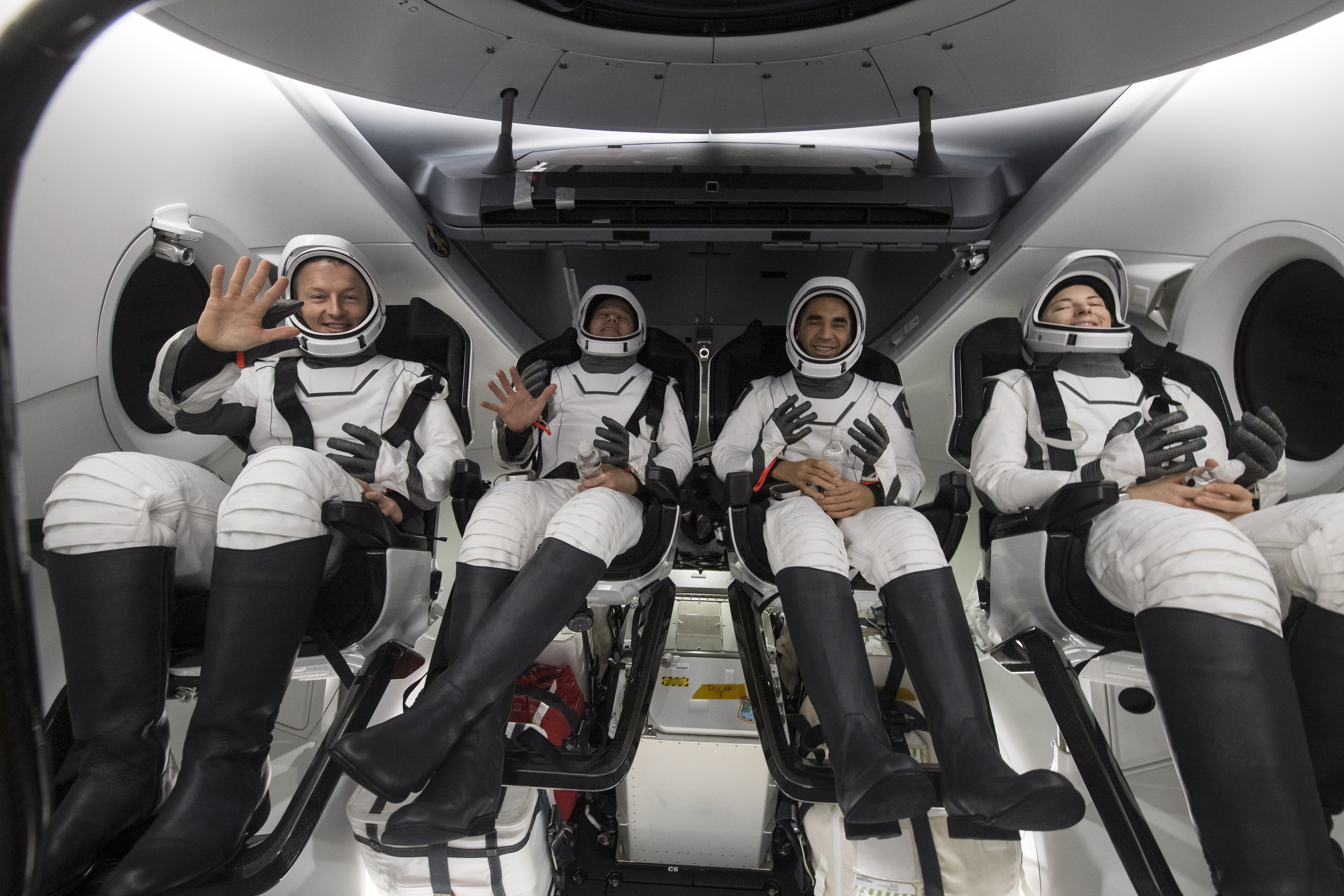
Crew-3 astronauts after splashdown

== See also ==
- Dragon C206 Endeavour
- Dragon C207 Resilience
- Dragon C210 Endurance
- Dragon C212 Freedom
