= Expedition 67 =

Long-duration mission to the International Space Station

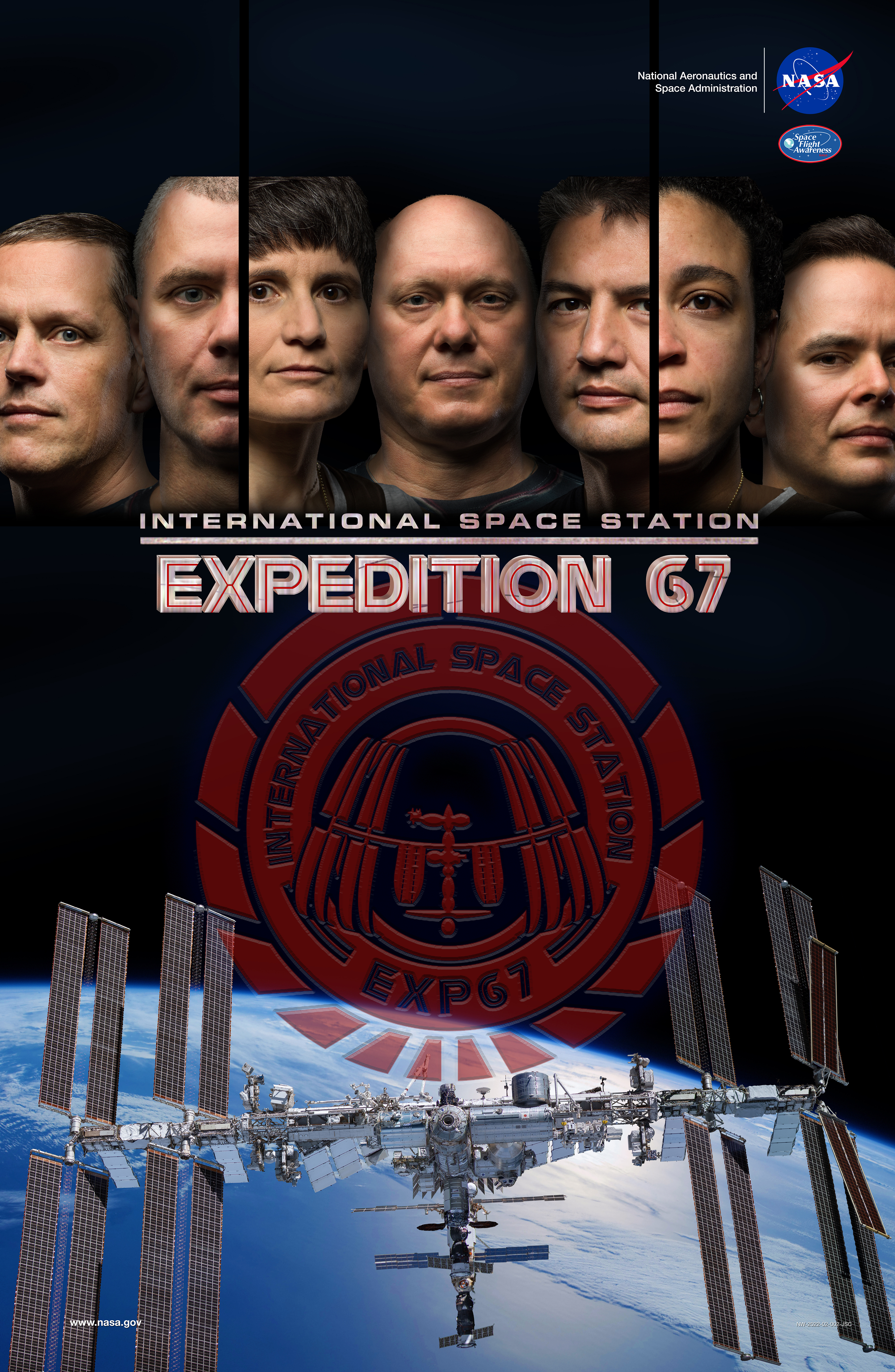
- Promotional poster
- Mission type: Long-duration expedition
- Operator: NASA / Roscosmos
- Mission duration: 183 days and 12 minutes

Expedition
- Space station: International Space Station
- Began: 30 March 2022, 07:21:03 UTC
- Ended: 29 September 2022, 07:34 UTC
- Arrived aboard: SpaceX Crew-3; Soyuz MS-21; SpaceX Crew-4; Soyuz MS-22
- Departed aboard: SpaceX Crew-3; Soyuz MS-21

Crew
- Crew size: 7-11
- Members: Expedition 66/67: Raja Chari; Thomas Marshburn; Kayla Barron; Matthias Maurer; Oleg Artemyev; Denis Matveev; Sergey Korsakov; Expedition 67/68: Kjell N. Lindgren; Bob Hines; Samantha Cristoforetti; Jessica Watkins; Expedition 67/68/69: Sergey Prokopyev; Dmitry Petelin; Francisco Rubio
- EVAs: 5
- EVA duration: 33 hours 12 minutes
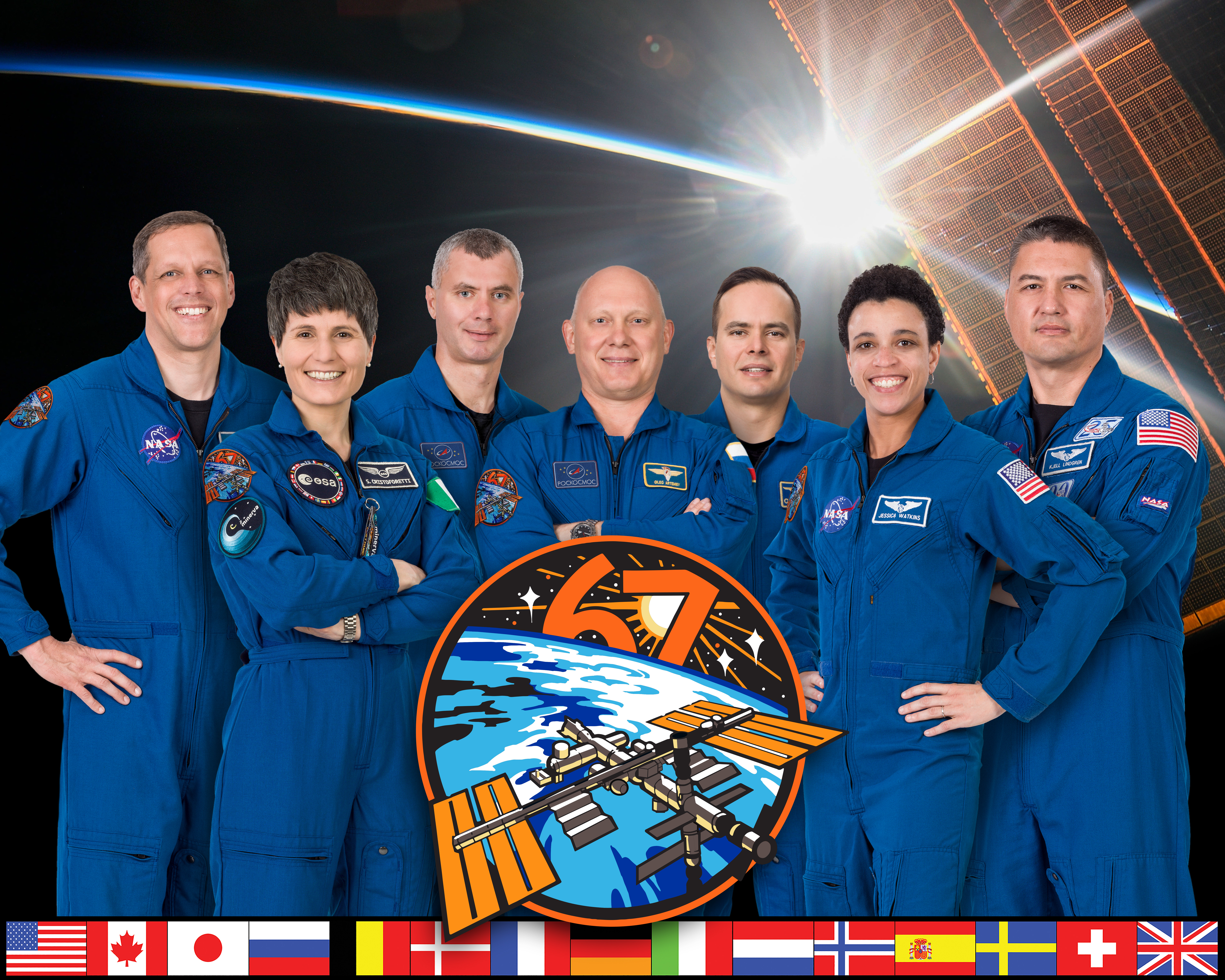
- Expedition 67 mission patch Expedition 67 crew portrait ISS expeditions

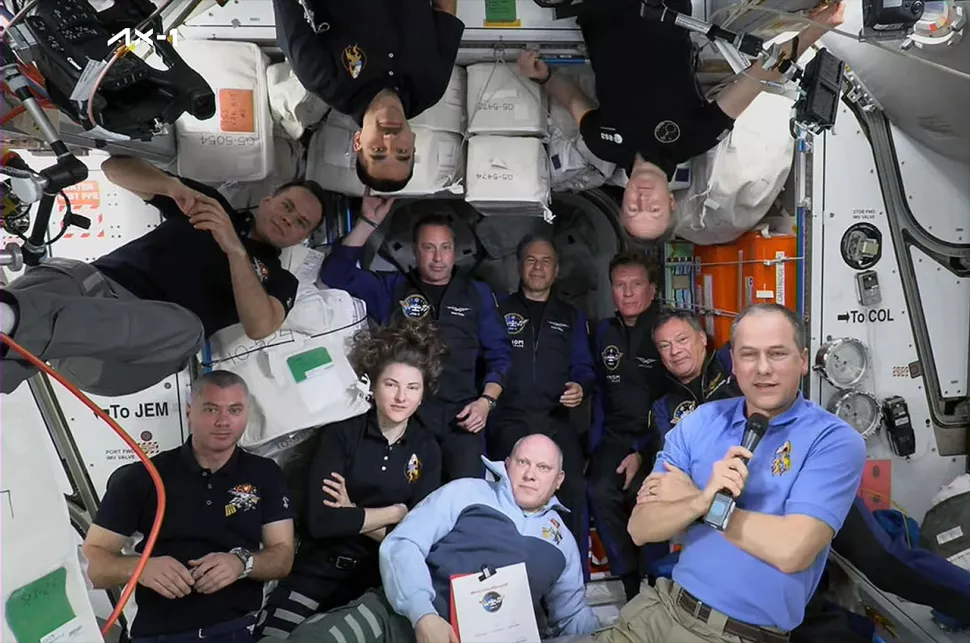
The crews from Expedition 67 crew (top and bottom row and one on center left) with non expedition Axiom Mission-1 crew (remaining in center row).

Expedition 67 was the 67th long-duration expedition to the International Space Station. The expedition began upon the departure of Soyuz MS-19 on 30 March 2022 with NASA astronaut Thomas Marshburn taking over as ISS commander.

== Background, Crew, and Events ==
Initially, the expedition consisted of Marshburn and his three SpaceX Crew-3 crewmates Raja Chari, Kayla Barron, and Matthias Maurer, as well as Roscosmos cosmonauts Oleg Artemyev, Denis Matveev, and Sergey Korsakov, who launched aboard Soyuz MS-21 on March 18, 2022 and transferred from Expedition 66 alongside the Crew-3 astronauts. However, continued international collaboration has been thrown into doubt by the 2022 Russian invasion of Ukraine and related sanctions on Russia.

During Expedition 67, the space station was also visited by the crew of Axiom Mission 1, a space tourist mission that brought three spaceflight participants to the station on April 9, 2022 along with former NASA astronaut Michael López-Alegría, who had previously commanded the station during Expedition 14. They departed the ISS on April 25, 2022.

Crew-3 departed on May 5, 2022 and was replaced by SpaceX Crew-4, which ferried NASA astronauts Kjell N. Lindgren, Bob Hines and Jessica Watkins, as well as ESA astronaut Samantha Cristoforetti, to the station. Before departing, Marshburn handed command of the station over to Artemyev. Starliner visited the station for the first time in May 2022 during the OFT-2 mission. At the end of Expedition 67, they remained on the ISS as part of Expedition 68 in September 2022.

== Events manifest ==
Events involving crewed spacecraft are listed in bold.

Previous mission: Expedition 66

- 30 March 2022 - **Soyuz MS-19 undocking, official switch from Expedition 66**
- 8 April 2022 – **Axiom Mission 1 docking (non-Expedition crew)**
- 18 April 2022 - EVA 1 (VKD-50) Artemyev/Matveyev: 6 hrs, 37 mins
- 25 April 2022 – **Axiom Mission 1 undocking (non-Expedition crew)**
- 27 April 2022 - **SpaceX Crew-4 docking**
- 28 April 2022 - EVA 2 (VKD-51) Artemyev/Matveyev: 7 hrs, 42 mins
- 4 May 2022 - ISS Expedition 67 change of command ceremony from Thomas Marshburn to Oleg Artemyev
- 5 May 2022 - **SpaceX Crew-3 undocking**
- 21 May 2022 - Boe-OFT-2 docking
- 25 May 2022 - Boe-OFT-2 undocking
- 1 June 2022 - Progress MS-18/79P undocking
- 3 June 2022 - Progress MS-20/81P docking
- 28 June 2022 - CRS NG-17 unberthing and release
- 16 July 2022 - CRS SpX-25 docking
- 21 July 2022 - EVA 3 (VKD-52) Artemyev/Cristoforetti: 7 hrs, 5 mins
- 17 August 2022 - EVA 4 (VKD-53) Artemyev/Matveyev: 4 hrs, 1 min
- 19 August 2022 - CRS SpX-25 undocking
- 2 September 2022 - EVA 5 (VKD-54) Artemyev/Matveyev: 7 hrs, 47 mins
- 21 September 2022 - **Soyuz MS-22 docking**
- 28 September 2022 - ISS Expedition 67/68 change of command ceremony from Oleg Artemyev to Samantha Cristoforetti
- 29 September 2022 - **Soyuz MS-21 undocking, official switch to Expedition 68**

Next mission: Expedition 68

== Crew ==
Flight	Astronaut	First part (30 March-27 April 2022)	Second part (27 April–5 May 2022)	Third part (5 May-21 September 2022)	Fourth part (21–29 September 2022)
Soyuz MS-21	Oleg Artemyev, Roscosmos; Third and last spaceflight	Flight engineer		Commander	
Soyuz MS-21	Denis Matveev, Roscosmos; Only spaceflight	Flight engineer			
Soyuz MS-21	Sergey Korsakov, Roscosmos; Only spaceflight	Flight engineer			
SpaceX Crew-3	Raja Chari, NASA; First spaceflight	Flight engineer		Off station	
SpaceX Crew-3	Thomas Marshburn, NASA; Third and last spaceflight	Commander		Off station	
SpaceX Crew-3	Kayla Barron, NASA; First spaceflight	Flight engineer		Off station	
SpaceX Crew-3	Matthias Maurer, ESA; First spaceflight	Flight engineer		Off station	
SpaceX Crew-4	Kjell N. Lindgren, NASA; Second spaceflight	Off station	Flight engineer		
SpaceX Crew-4	Bob Hines, NASA; First spaceflight	Off station	Flight engineer		
SpaceX Crew-4	Samantha Cristoforetti, ESA; Second spaceflight	Off station	Flight engineer		
SpaceX Crew-4	Jessica Watkins, NASA; First spaceflight	Off station	Flight engineer		
Soyuz MS-22	Sergey Prokopyev, Roscosmos; Second spaceflight	Off station			Flight engineer
Soyuz MS-22	Dmitry Petelin, Roscosmos; First spaceflight	Off station			Flight engineer
Soyuz MS-22	Francisco Rubio, NASA; First spaceflight	Off station			Flight engineer
