= Robert Hines (astronaut) =

American fighter pilot and astronaut (born 1975)

Bob Hines
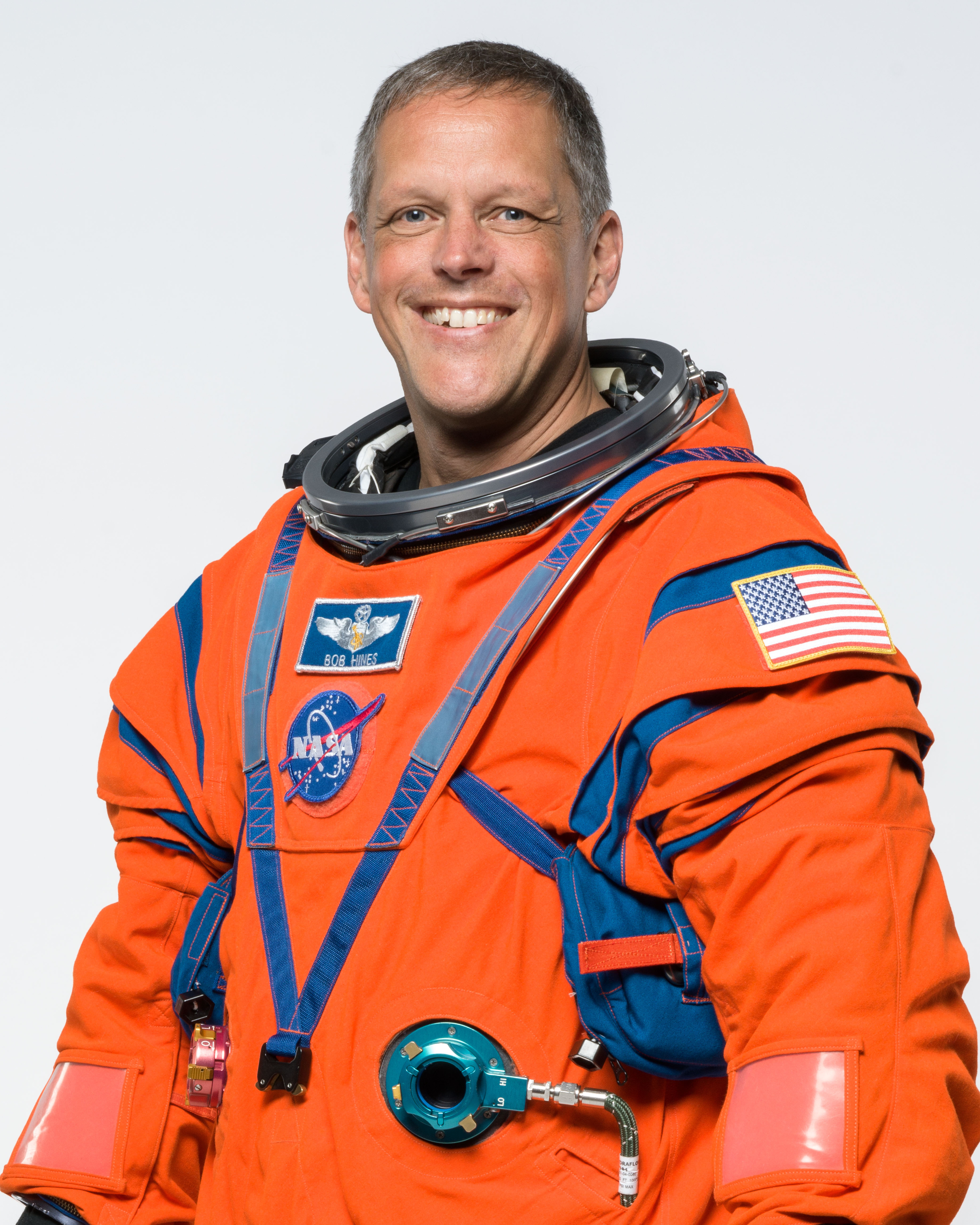
- Hines in 2026
- Born: Robert Thomas Hines Jr. January 11, 1975 (age 51); Fayetteville, North Carolina, U.S.
- Education: Boston University (BS); U.S. Air Force Test Pilot School (MS); University of Alabama (MS)
- Call sign: Farmer
- Space career

NASA astronaut
- Previous occupation: Research pilot, Johnson Space Center
- Rank: Colonel, United States Air Force
- Time in space: 170 days, 13 hours, 3 minutes
- Selection: NASA Group 22 (2017)
- Missions: SpaceX Crew-4 (Expedition 67/68)
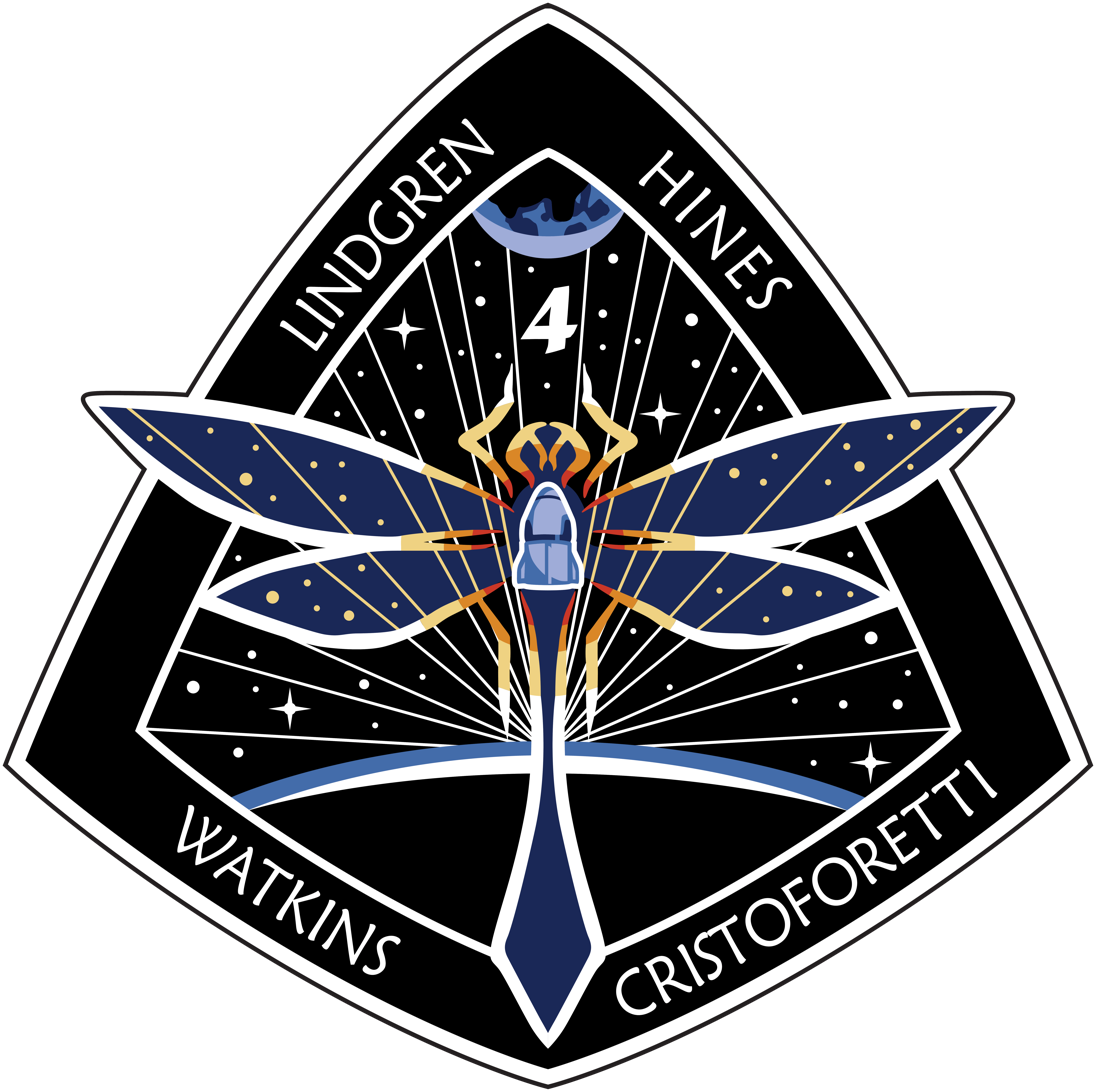
- Mission insignia

Robert "Bob" Thomas Hines Jr. (born January 11, 1975) is an American fighter pilot, NASA astronaut and the backup astronaut for the Artemis III mission.

== Early life and education ==
Robert Thomas Hines Jr. was born on January 11, 1975, in Fayetteville, North Carolina to Lynne Hines and Robert Thomas Hines Sr. His family moved to Mountain Top, Pennsylvania, where he attended Crestwood High School. In 1989, he attended Space Camp as a 14 year old. He graduated from Boston University in 1997 with a Bachelor of Science degree in aerospace engineering.

== Military career ==
In 1999, Hines graduated from Air Force Officer Training School and was commissioned as a second lieutenant. He attended Specialized Undergraduate Pilot Training (SUPT) at Columbus Air Force Base and graduated in 2000 as part of class 01–03. After pilot training, he was an instructor pilot on the T-37 Tweet. He then trained to be an F-15E Strike Eagle pilot at Seymour Johnson Air Force Base, before an assignment at RAF Lakenheath. While at RAF Lakenheath, he deployed for operations in the Middle East. In 2008, Hines attended the U.S. Air Force Test Pilot School, where he received a Master of Science in flight test engineering. His first assignment as a test pilot was to Eglin Air Force Base, where he tested the F-15C Eagle and F-15E Strike Eagle, and deployed as a U-28 pilot. In 2010, Hines received his Masters of Science in aerospace engineering at the University of Alabama. Hines joined the Air Force Reserves at NAS JRB Fort Worth in 2011, where he worked as a wing plans officer, as well as a F-15E program test pilot at the 84th Test and Evaluation Squadron at Eglin Air Force Base. Throughout his career, he has flown 76 combat missions, and has over 3,500 hours of flight time in 41 aircraft. His transfer back to the regular Air Force as a lieutenant colonel was approved by the U.S. Senate in February 2019.

== NASA career ==
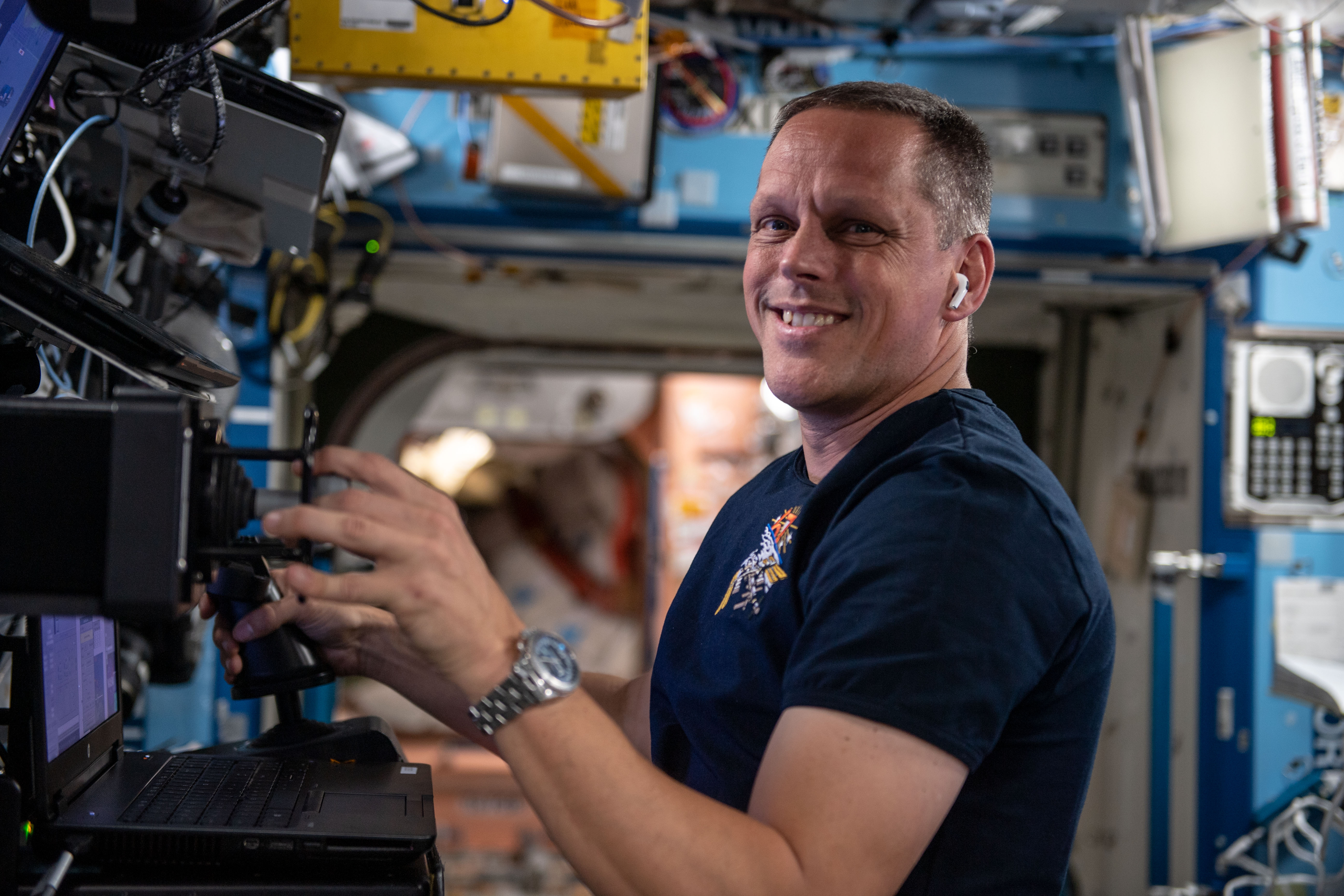
Hines aboard the International Space Station in May 2022

Prior to his selection as an astronaut, Hines served as a test pilot at NASA's Johnson Space Center, as well as for the Federal Aviation Administration. In 2017, he was selected as a member of NASA Astronaut Group 22, and began his two-year training. At the time of his selection, Hines was a research pilot for the Aircraft Operations Division of the Flight Operations Directorate at NASA.

In February 2021, Hines was assigned as pilot of SpaceX Crew-4, alongside NASA astronaut Kjell N. Lindgren who is the commander. They flew with mission specialists Samantha Cristoforetti of ESA and Jessica Watkins. Crew-4 launched successfully on April 27, 2022, before docking later that day.

On June 9, 2026, Hines was announced as the backup crew member for Artemis III.

== Personal life ==
Hines and his wife, Kelli, have three children.

== Amateur radio ==
Hines holds a Technician class Ham Radio operators license with call sign KI5RQT.

== Awards and honors ==
During his Air Force career, Hines received multiple awards, including the Air Medal, Aerial Achievement Medal, Iraq Campaign Medal, Afghanistan Campaign Medal, and the Nuclear Deterrence Operations Service Medal. He received the U.S. Air Force Bobby Bond Memorial Aviator Award, and the NASA Stuart Present Flight Achievement Award. He is a member of the Society of Experimental Test Pilots and the American Institute of Aeronautics and Astronautics.
