= Kayla Barron =

American astronaut

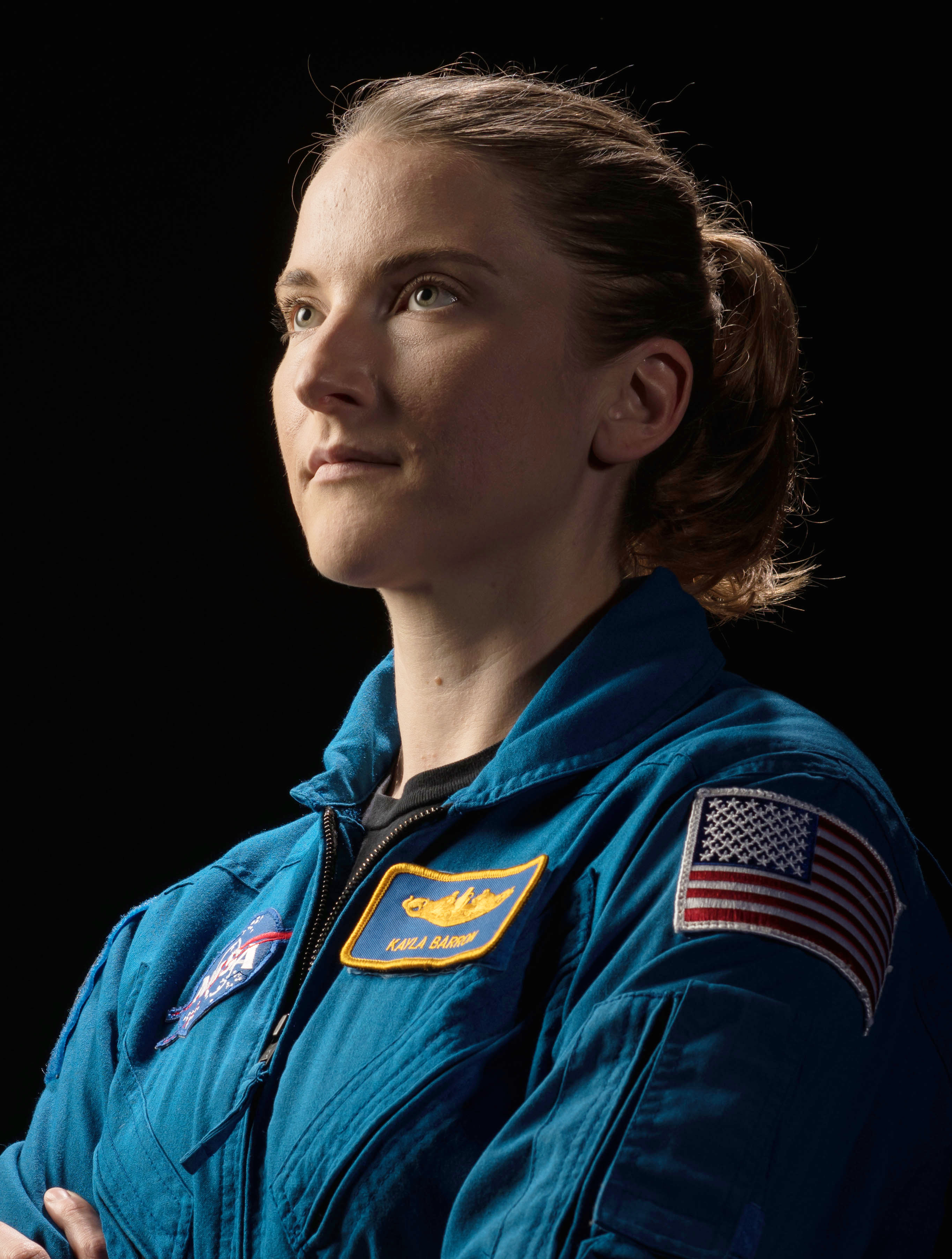
- Barron in 2021
- Born: Kayla Barron; September 19, 1987 (age 39); Pocatello, Idaho, U.S.
- Education: United States Naval Academy (BS); Peterhouse, Cambridge (MPhil)
- Spouse: Tom Barron
- Space career

NASA astronaut
- Rank: Commander, U.S. Navy
- Time in space: 176 days, 2 hours, 39 minutes
- Selection: NASA Group 22 (2017)
- Total EVAs: 2
- Total EVA time: 13 hours, 26 minutes
- Missions: SpaceX Crew-3 (Expedition 66/67)
- Mission insignia

Kayla Jane Barron (née Sax; born September 19, 1987) is an American submarine warfare officer, engineer, and NASA astronaut. She was selected in June 2017 as a member of the NASA Astronaut Group 22, and later qualified as an astronaut in 2020. She took part in her first spaceflight, SpaceX Crew-3, as part of the crew of Expedition 66/67, which launched to the International Space Station on November 10, 2021. Before joining NASA, she was a submarine warfare officer and Flag Aide to the Superintendent at the Naval Academy.

== Early life and education ==
Kayla Barron was born on September 19, 1987, in Pocatello, Idaho, to Lauri and Scott Sax. Her family moved to Richland, Washington, where she graduated from Richland High School in 2006. After high school, Barron attended the United States Naval Academy, where she graduated in 2010 with a Bachelor of Science degree in systems engineering.

While at the Naval Academy, Barron was a member of the Midshipmen cross country and track teams. Following her graduation, she attended Peterhouse at the University of Cambridge on a Gates Cambridge Scholarship; and received a Master of Philosophy degree in nuclear engineering in 2011. Motivated by a desire to address anthropogenic climate change, her graduate research focused on modeling the fuel cycle for a next-generation, thorium-fueled nuclear reactor concept known as an accelerator-driven subcritical reactor.

== Military career ==
After obtaining a master's degree, Barron was part of the first group of women to become submarine warfare officers. She attended the Navy's nuclear power and submarine officer training program, and was assigned to the Ohio-class submarine USS Maine. While serving on the USS Maine, she completed three patrols as a division officer. Following her submarine assignment, she was Flag Aide to the Superintendent at the Naval Academy until her selection as an astronaut.

== NASA career ==
In June 2017, Barron was selected as a member of NASA Astronaut Group 22 and began her two-year training. She was the fifth female Naval Academy graduate selected as an astronaut candidate.

She trained for the SpaceX Crew-3 mission, during which she worked aboard the International Space Station as a mission specialist. She launched on board the SpaceX Crew Dragon capsule Endurance on November 10, 2021, and served as part of the Expedition 66/67 long duration mission to the ISS. Crew-3 landed in the Gulf of Mexico on May 6, 2022 after 177 days in space.

On September 24, 2026, NASA announced that Barron was assigned as commander of the SpaceX Crew-14 mission to the International Space Station. She will fly as part of Expedition 75/76. It will be her second mission to the station as well as becoming NASA's second astronaut to ride on Crew Dragon twice.

== Personal life ==
Barron is married to Tom Barron, a U.S. Army Special Forces officer.

== Amateur radio ==
Barron received a Technician Class amateur radio license from the FCC on September 21, 2020. Her call sign is KI5LAL.

== Honors ==
Barron was a Trident Scholar and Distinguished Graduate at the Naval Academy, and a Gates Cambridge Scholar at Cambridge.

== Awards ==
=== Warfare insignia ===
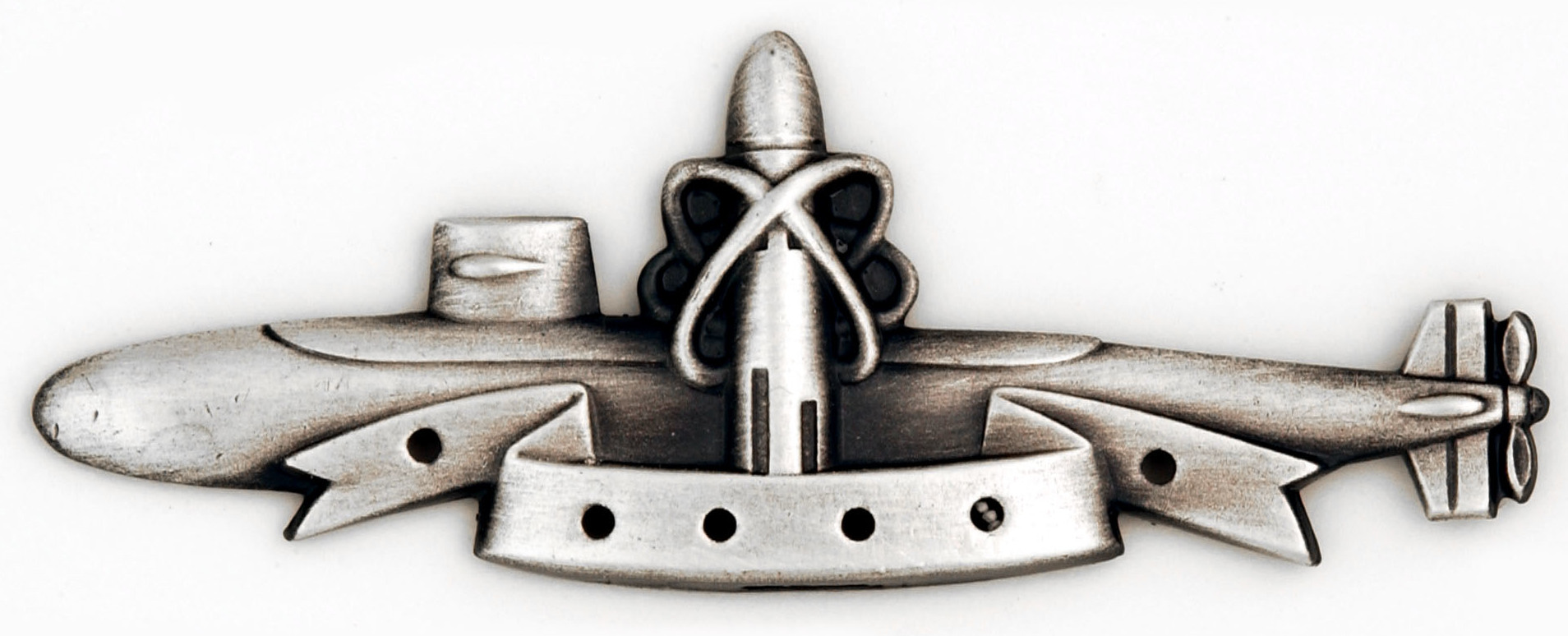
Submarine Warfare Insignia
SSBN Deterrent Patrol Insignia

=== Decorations and medals ===
Navy Commendation Medal
Navy Achievement Medal
Navy Meritorious Unit Commendation
Navy "E" Ribbon
National Defense Service Medal
Global War on Terrorism Medal
Navy Rifle Marksmanship Ribbon
Navy Pistol Marksmanship Ribbon with Sharpshooter Device

=== NASA Astronaut Pin ===
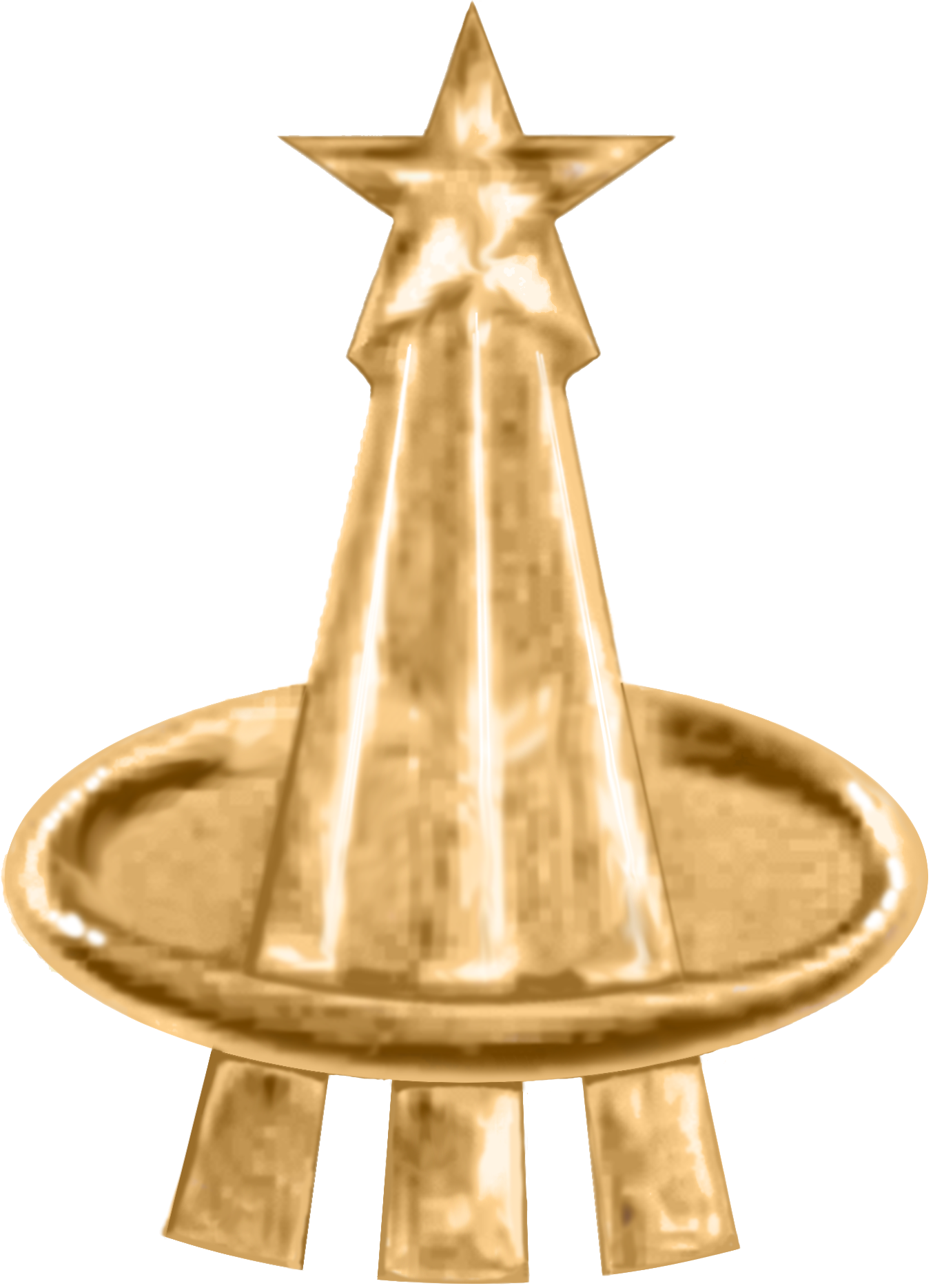
Nasa Astronaut Pin (Gold)
