= John McFall =

John McFall may refer to:

- John McFall (athlete) (born 1981), British Paralympic sprinter, surgeon and astronaut
- John McFall, Baron McFall of Alcluith (born 1944), British politician
- John J. McFall (1918–2006), former member of the US House of Representatives for California
