= JAXA Astronaut Corps =

Japanese space exploration unit

The JAXA Astronaut Corps is a unit of the Japan Aerospace Exploration Agency (JAXA) that selects, trains, and provides astronauts as crew members for U.S. and Russian space missions. As of July 2026, the corps has six active members.

== History ==
The first Japanese astronauts were chosen by NASDA, the predecessor to JAXA, in 1985 to train as international mission specialists in the Space Shuttle program.

The first Japanese citizen to fly in space was Toyohiro Akiyama, a journalist sponsored by TBS, who flew aboard the Soviet Soyuz TM-11 in December 1990. He spent more than seven days in space aboard the Mir space station, in what the Soviets called their first commercial spaceflight which allowed them to earn $14 million.

The first member of the Japanese Astronaut Corps to fly was Mamoru Mohri aboard STS-47 in 1992.

On 1 October 2003, three organizations were merged to form the new JAXA: Japan's Institute of Space and Astronautical Science (ISAS), the National Aerospace Laboratory of Japan (NAL), and National Space Development Agency of Japan (NASDA). JAXA was formed as an Independent Administrative Institution administered by the Ministry of Education, Culture, Sports, Science and Technology (MEXT) and the Ministry of Internal Affairs and Communications (MIC).

== Members ==
The Astronauts Corps is one of the main divisions within JAXA. The agency generally recruits astronauts who have degrees as scientists, engineers and/or medical doctors. In addition to being Japanese citizens or residents, candidates must meet certain physical standards (including height, weight, hearing and visual acuity), educational requirements, and be fluent in English.

=== Active ===
As of July 2026, JAXA has six active astronauts, five men and one woman.

| Astronaut | Missions | Group | Notes |
|---|---|---|---|
| Akihiko Hoshide | 3: STS-124, Soyuz TMA-05M (Expedition 32/33), SpaceX Crew-2 (Expedition 65/66) | 1999 | |
| Kimiya Yui | 2: Soyuz TMA-17M (Expedition 44/45), SpaceX Crew-11 (Expedition 73/74) | 2009 | |
| Takuya Onishi | 2: Soyuz MS-01 (Expedition 48/49), SpaceX Crew-10 (Expedition 72/73) | 2009 | |
| Norishige Kanai | 1: Soyuz MS-07 (Expedition 54/55) | 2009 | Head of the Astronaut Corps |
| Makoto Suwa | None, upcoming: SpaceX Crew-14 (Expedition 75/76) | 2023 | |
| Ayu Yoneda | None, awaiting assignment | 2023 | |

=== Former ===
There are seven former JAXA astronauts.

| Astronaut | Missions | Group | Notes |
|---|---|---|---|
| Takao Doi | STS-87, STS-123 | 1985 | |
| Satoshi Furukawa | Soyuz TMA-02M (Expedition 28/29), SpaceX Crew-7 (Expedition 69/70) | 1999 | |
| Mamoru Mohri | STS-47, STS-99 | 1985 | Second Japanese man to fly in space |
| Chiaki Mukai | STS-65, STS-95 | 1985 | First Japanese woman to fly in space |
| Koichi Wakata | STS-72, STS-92, STS-119/127 (Expedition 18/19/20), Soyuz TMA-11M (Expedition 38/39), SpaceX Crew-5 (Expedition 68) | 1992 | |
| Soichi Noguchi | STS-114, Soyuz TMA-17 (Expedition 22/23), SpaceX Crew-1 (Expedition 64/65) | 1996 | |
| Naoko Yamazaki | STS-131 | 1999 | |

== Selection groups ==
- 1985 NASDA Group
- 1992 NASDA Group
- 1996 NASDA Group
- 1999 NASDA Group
- 2009 JAXA Group
- 2023 JAXA Group

== See also ==
- Toyohiro Akiyama — First Japanese person in space
- Other astronaut corps:
  - Canadian Astronaut Corps
  - European Astronaut Corps
  - NASA Astronaut Corps (United States)
  - Indian Astronaut Corps (India)
  - Roscosmos Cosmonaut Corps (Russia)
  - People's Liberation Army Astronaut Corps (China)
- List of astronauts by selection
- Human spaceflight
- History of spaceflight
