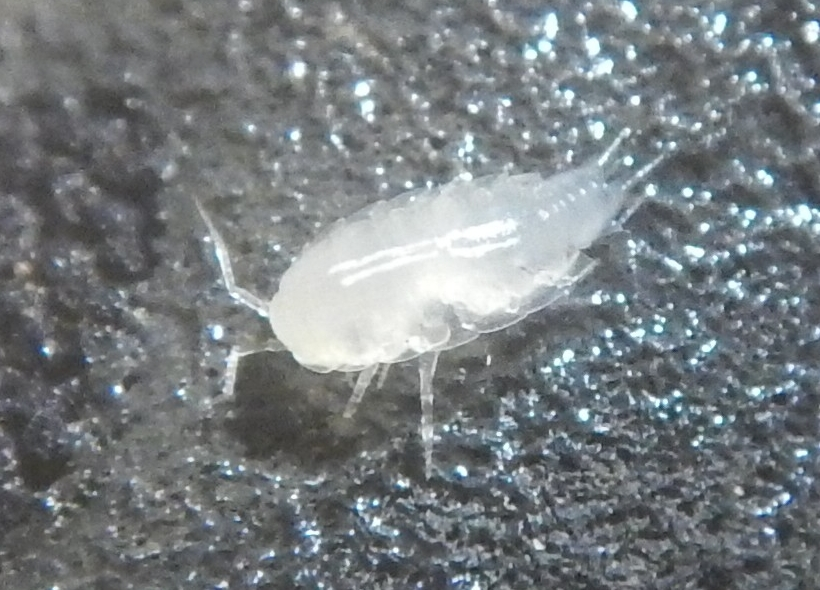
- Alpioniscus sideralis

Scientific classification
- Kingdom: Animalia
- Phylum: Arthropoda
- Class: Malacostraca
- Order: Isopoda
- Suborder: Oniscidea
- Family: Trichoniscidae
- Genus: Alpioniscus; Racovitza, 1908

= Alpioniscus =

Genus of woodlice

Alpioniscus is a southern European genus of woodlice in the family Trichoniscidae. Alpioniscus consists of two subgenera: Alpioniscus s.s. and Illyrionethes. A 2019 study used molecular and taxonomic analyses to verify the validity of the current taxonomy, resulting in the redescription of several species and the description of two new species.

== Species ==
- Alpioniscus absoloni (Strouhal, 1939)
- Alpioniscus alzonae = Alpioniscus fragilis (Brian, 1921)
- Alpioniscus balthasari (Frankenberger, 1937)
- Alpioniscus boldorii Arcangeli, 1952
- Alpioniscus bosniensis (Frankenberger, 1939)
- Alpioniscus caprai = Alpioniscus feneriensis (Colosi, 1924)
- Alpioniscus christiani Potočnik, 1983
- Alpioniscus dispersus = Alpioniscus feneriensis (Racovitza, 1907)
- Alpioniscus epigani Vandel, 1959
- Alpioniscus escolai Cruz & Dalens, 1989
- Alpioniscus feneriensis (Parona, 1880)
- Alpioniscus fragilis (Budde-Lund, 1909)
- Alpioniscus giurensis Schmalfuss, 1981
- Alpioniscus haasi (Verhoeff, 1931)
- Alpioniscus henroti Vandel, 1964
- Alpioniscus heroldi (Verhoeff, 1931)
- Alpioniscus herzegowinensis (Verhoeff, 1931)
- Alpioniscus iapodicus Bedek, Horvatović & Karaman, 2017
- Alpioniscus hirci Bedek & Taiti
- Alpioniscus karamani Buturović, 1954
- Alpioniscus kratochvili (Frankenberger, 1938)
- Alpioniscus magnus (Frankenberger, 1938)
- Alpioniscus matsakisi Andreev, 1984
- Alpioniscus medius = Spelaeonethes medius (Carl, 1908)
- Alpioniscus metohicus (Pljakić, 1970)
- Alpioniscus sideralis Taiti & Argano, 2019.
- Alpioniscus skopjensis = Macedonethes skopjensis Buturović, 1955
- Alpioniscus slatinensis Buturović, 1955
- Alpioniscus strasseri (Verhoeff, 1927)
- Alpioniscus thracicus Andreev, 1986
- Alpioniscus trogirensis Buturović, 1955
- Alpioniscus tuberculatus (Frankenberger, 1939)
- Alpioniscus vardarensis (Buturović, 1954)
- Alpioniscus vejdovskyi (Frankenberger, 1939)
- Alpioniscus velebiticus Bedek & Taiti
- Alpioniscus verhoeffi (Strouhal, 1938)
