= Jacquin Niles =

- Born: Anguilla
- Education: Massachusetts Institute of Technology (BS, MS, PhD); Harvard University (MD)
- Known for: Antimalarial drug discovery
- Scientific career
- Workplaces: Massachusetts Institute of Technology; University of California, Berkeley
- Thesis: Chemical characterization of the peroxynitrite-induced guanine and 8-oxyguanine reaction products (2000)
- Doctoral advisor: Steven R. Tannenbaum
- Doctoral students: Christina Birch
- Website: Niles Lab

Jacquin C. Niles is an American Professor of Biological Engineering and Director of the Massachusetts Institute of Technology Center for Environmental Health Sciences. In an effort to design new antimalarial drugs, Niles studies the malaria parasite and investigates how it interacts with human hosts.

== Early life and education ==
Niles was born in Anguilla, and stayed there until he finished high school. In high school he became interested in biology and chemistry. Niles studied chemistry at the Massachusetts Institute of Technology and graduated in 1994. During his undergraduate degree he completed a research project on nitrogenase. He was a graduate student in the Harvard–MIT Program of Health Sciences and Technology, and worked under the supervision of Steven R. Tannenbaum. He earned an MD and PhD in Molecular Toxicology. During his doctorate he studied DNA damage caused by chronic inflammation and nitric oxide. He looked to understand the increased cancer risks with inflammatory diseases. Niles was a postdoctoral scholar in the University of California, Berkeley with Michael Marletta. His postdoctoral work was supported by the National Human Genome Research Institute.

== Research and career ==
Niles was appointed to the faculty at Massachusetts Institute of Technology in 2008. He was awarded an National Institutes of Health Director's New Innovator Award. His research considers engineered parasites for the diagnosis, prevention and treatment of malaria. He develops tools to regulate gene expression, as well as probes to interrogate the heme metabolism in malarial parasites and host–pathogen interactions. To do this, Niles developed an automated deformability cytometer that can measure the dynamic, mechanical responses of red blood cells. Niles is also interested in how plasmodium falciparum controls heme levels and designed a technique to monitor heme. Heme is a biomolecule that interacts with several malarial drugs. To study this, he created a heme-sensing protein, whose fluorescence diminishes upon binding to heme. By expressing the heme-sening protein in the target plasmodium falciparum parasite, Niles made it possible to monitor the levels of heme through changes in fluorescence. Niles used this to show that malarial parasites contain high levels of labile heme than anticipated. Additionally, Niles demonstrated that CRISPR could be used to disrupt parasite genes, which provides information about how parasites invade and replicate inside red blood cells.

The Niles lab collects publicly available genomics and transcriptomics data of these parasites, then builds a sequence of technologies to enter parasites and manipulate when genes are expressed. Niles performs phenotypic screening to understand which parasites should be taken for further development. Niles embeds target information within the phenotypic screening, which, alongside compound efficacy, provides information about exactly which targets the compound is interacting with. Niles uses CRISPR gene editing to embed the technologies to control when genes are turned on or turned off. Once Niles has identified the specific genes a compound might target, he can control the expression of that gene to make parasites more susceptible to the compound, then map the sensitivity relationships to understand the relationships between compounds and target genes.

He is part of a multi-institution investigation into apicomplexan parasites, working with Karine Le Roch at University of California, Riverside. He has also collaborated with Assistant Professor of Chemistry Emily Derbyshire at Duke University investigating how a lipid-protein compound in the cells of the malaria parasite help make the parasite able to withstand high temperatures brought on by fever. In April 2019, Niles was made Director of the Massachusetts Institute of Technology Center for Environmental Health Sciences.
