= Nora Al Matrooshi =

Emirati astronaut (born 1993)

- نورا المطروشي
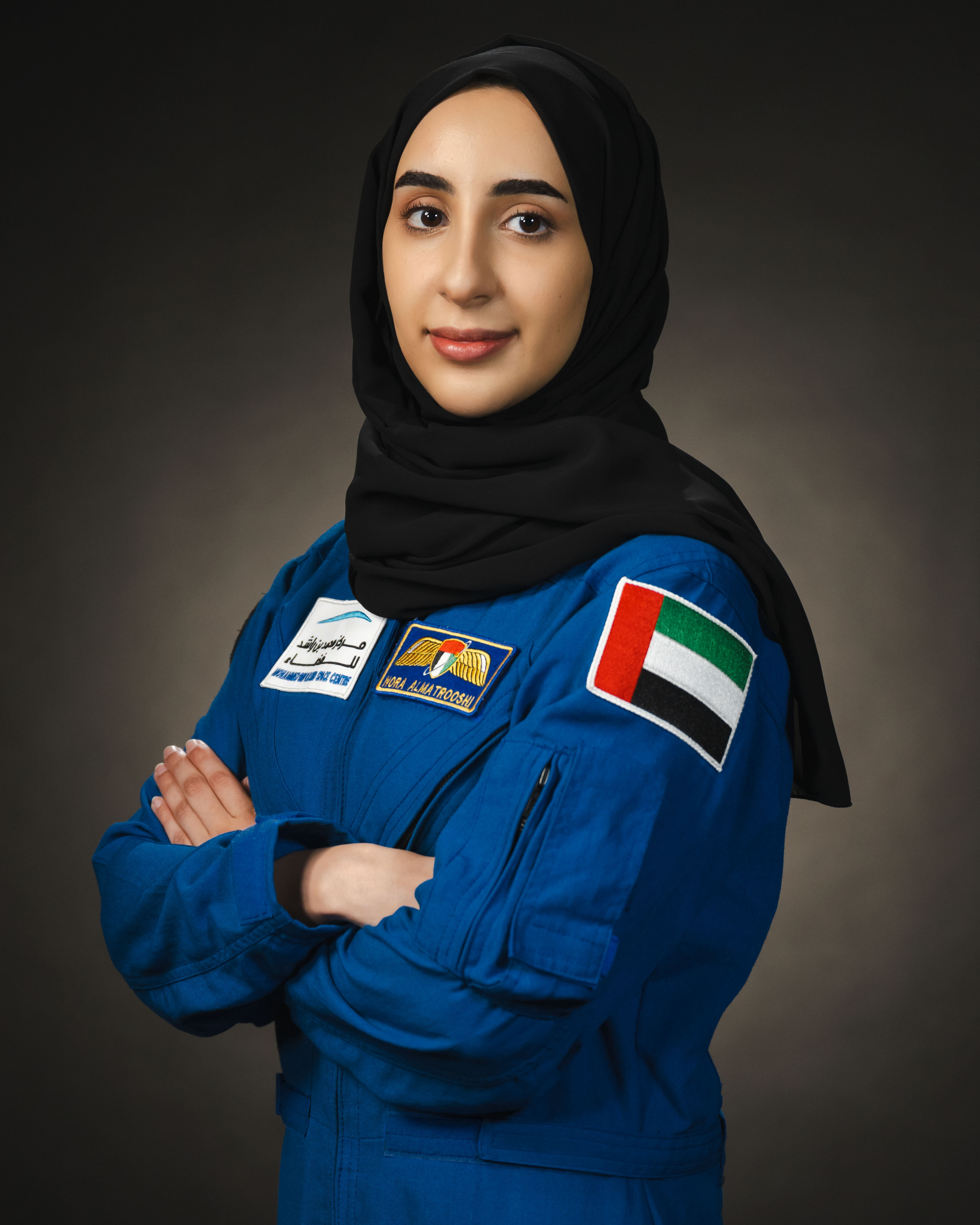
- AlMatrooshi in 2024
- Born: 1993 (age 32–33); Emirate of Sharjah, UAE
- Space career

MBRSC astronaut
- Status: Active
- Selection: MBRSC Group 2 (2021); NASA Group 23 (2021)

Nora Al Matrooshi (Arabic: نورا المطروشي; born 1993) is an Emirati astronaut who was selected as part of the second batch of the UAE Astronaut Programme. In 2024, she graduated from the NASA astronaut candidate class training program and received her astronaut pin, establishing her as a fully qualified astronaut prepared for future space missions. She is the first Emirati and Arab woman astronaut.

== Education ==
Al Matrooshi holds a bachelor's degree in mechanical engineering from United Arab Emirates University and completed a semester at Vaasa University of Applied Sciences in Finland.

== Career ==
Professionally, she worked as a piping engineer at the National Petroleum Construction Company, contributing to projects for Abu Dhabi National Oil Company (ADNOC) and Saudi Aramco. She also served as vice president of the Youth Council at the National Petroleum Construction Company for three consecutive years and later worked as a technical specialist at ADNOC.

Al Matrooshi was part of the UAE team for the 2011 International Mathematical Olympiad. In 2013, she was selected as part of the UAE Youth Ambassadors Programme in South Korea. She implemented various projects and represented the UAE in the UN International Youth Conference in both 2018 and 2019.

Al Matrooshi was one of two astronauts selected from over 4,000 applicants in the second batch of the UAE Astronaut Programme, which was launched by Sheikh Mohamed bin Zayed Al Nahyan and Sheikh Mohammed bin Rashid Al Maktoum, and is one of the projects managed by the Mohammed Bin Rashid Space Centre (MBRSC), where Al Matrooshi underwent extensive training before joining NASA's 2021 Astronaut Candidate Class at the Johnson Space Center in Houston. Her training covered five major categories: spacewalking at the Neutral Buoyancy Lab, robotics, ISS systems, piloting the T-38 jet, and Russian language lessons. She also engaged in advanced training exercises such as survival training at Alabama's Fort Novosel and lessons on Earth's geology.

== See also ==
- Timeline of space travel by nationality
- UAE Space Agency
