= Christina Birch =

American professional racing cyclist and NASA astronaut

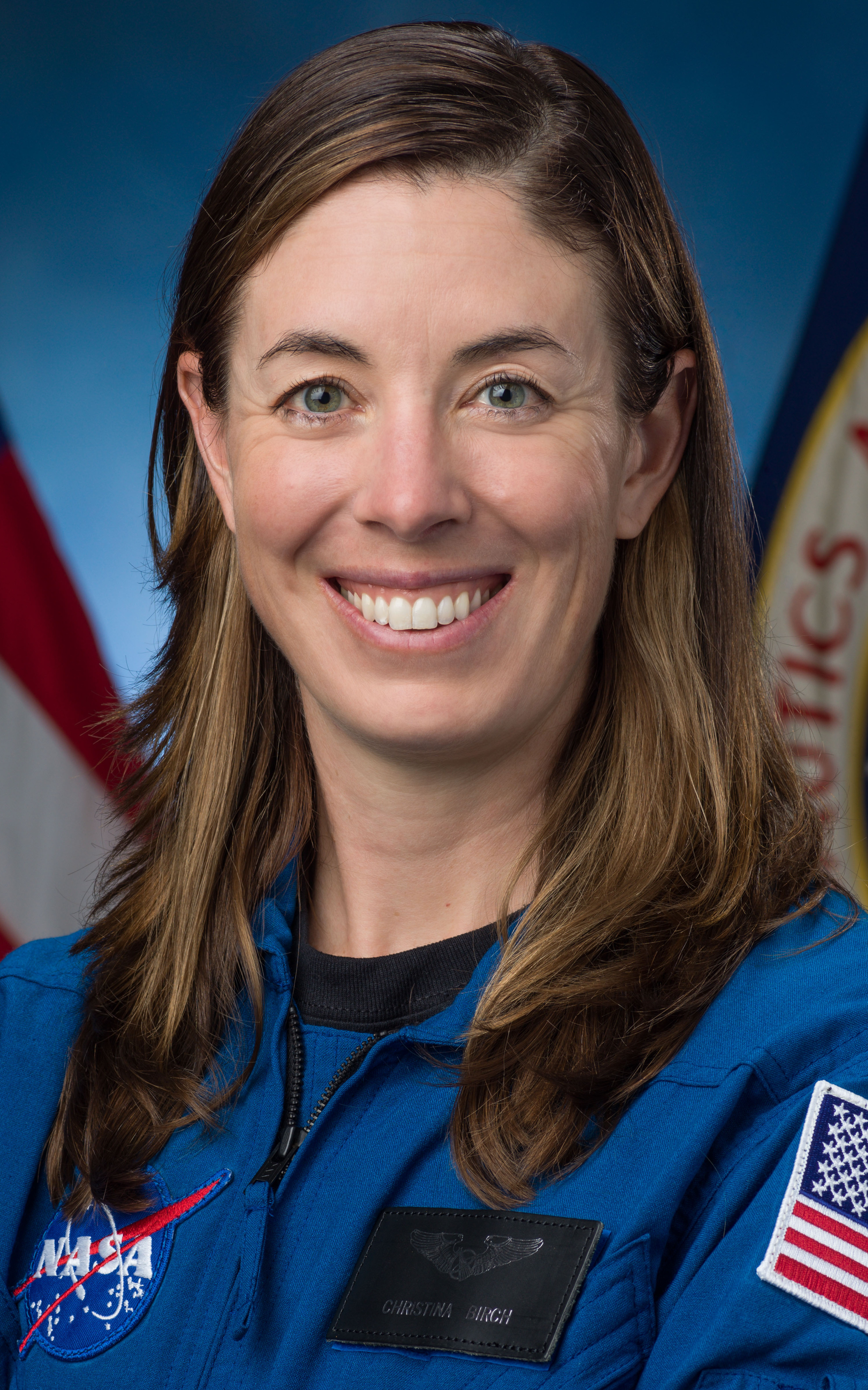
- NASA portrait, 2021
- Born: Christina Marie Birch; November 17, 1986 (age 39); Mesa, Arizona, U.S.
- Education: University of Arizona (BS); Massachusetts Institute of Technology (MS, PhD)
- Space career

NASA astronaut
- Selection: NASA Group 23 (2021)
- Scientific career
- Fields: Biological engineering
- Thesis: Identification of Malaria Parasite-Infected Red Blood Cell Aptamers by Inertial Microfluidics SELEX (2015)
- Doctoral advisor: Jacquin Niles

Christina Birch
Medal record

Women's track cycling

Representing United States

Pan American Championships
Gold medal – first place	2018 Aguascalientes	Team pursuit
Silver medal – second place	2019 Cochabamba	Team pursuit
Bronze medal – third place	2018 Aguascalientes	Madison

Christina Marie Birch (born November 17, 1986) is an American scientist and engineer, professional racing cyclist, and NASA astronaut.

== Early life and career ==
Birch grew up in Gilbert, Arizona, and graduated from the University of Arizona with a bachelor's degree in mathematics, biochemistry, and molecular biophysics. Birch began cycling with the MIT cycling team while working on her PhD. While at MIT she won the 2014 USA Cycling collegiate cyclocross division two national championship. Birch also represented the JAM Fund cyclocross team from 2011-2015.

After earning a doctorate in biological engineering from MIT in 2015, Birch moved to Southern California to pursue track cycling full time. She taught bioengineering at the University of California, Riverside, and scientific writing and communication at the California Institute of Technology. On the track, Birch has represented the US at multiple Pan American Championships, World Cups, and World Championships. She competed at the 2018 and 2019 UCI Track Cycling World Championships, and the 2019 Pan American Games.

Birch was named to the US track cycling 2020 Olympics long team for the USA in June 2020.

== Astronaut candidacy ==
On December 6, 2021, Birch was formally announced as a NASA astronaut candidate with NASA Astronaut Group 23.

During the Artemis II mission, Birch served as one of the Capsule Communicators for the mission.

On September 24, 2026, NASA announced that Birch was assigned as pilot of the SpaceX Crew-14 mission to the International Space Station. She will fly as part of Expedition 75/76.

== Major results ==
2014
National Cyclocross Championships

1st Collegiate Division Two

2015
National Track Championships

2nd Madison

2016
National Track Championships

1st Individual pursuit
2nd Madison
2nd Points race

2017
National Track Championships

1st Individual pursuit
1st Team pursuit
2nd Madison
2nd Points race

2018
Pan American Track Championships

1st Team pursuit
2nd Madison

National Track Championships

1st Team pursuit
1st Madison
2nd Points race
3rd Omnium

2019
Pan American Track Championships

2nd Team pursuit

National Track Championships

2nd Madison
3rd Points race
2nd Omnium

== Personal life ==
She is a partner of a racing cyclist Ashton Lambie.
