= Ayu Yoneda =

Japanese physician and JAXA astronaut

- 米田 あゆ
- Born: 1995 (age 30–31); Tokyo, Japan
- Education: University of Tokyo (M.D.)
- Space career

JAXA astronaut
- Previous occupation: Physician
- Selection: 2023 JAXA Group

Ayu Yoneda (Japanese: 米田 あゆ, born 1995) is a Japanese physician and JAXA astronaut. She was selected as part of JAXA's sixth astronaut group in February 2023 and completed her basic astronaut training in October 2024.

== Early life and education ==
Yoneda was born in Tokyo in 1995. She attended high school in Nishinomiya, Hyōgo Prefecture and also studied abroad in Switzerland during high school.

She graduated from the University of Tokyo with a Doctor of Medicine degree in March 2019.

== Medical career ==
After graduating, Yoneda worked at the University of Tokyo Hospital. In April 2021, she joined the Japanese Red Cross Medical Center as a surgeon. In October 2022, she transferred to Toranomon Hospital, where she remained until her resignation in March 2023 to join JAXA.

== Astronaut career ==
On 28 February 2023, Yoneda and Makoto Suwa were selected by JAXA from a record pool of 4,127 applicants to join its astronaut program. At 28 years old, she became the youngest person ever selected by the agency and the third Japanese woman to be chosen as an astronaut, following Chiaki Mukai and Naoko Yamazaki. Yoneda began basic training in April 2023 and officially joined JAXA that month. In September 2024, she underwent robotics training at the Canadian Space Agency in Longueuil, Quebec, where she practiced operating the Canadarm2 robotic arm. She completed her training and was certified as a full-fledged JAXA astronaut in October 2024. In June 2026, in collaboration with the European Space Agency, she took part in the ESA CAVES 2026 training programme alongside NASA astronaut candidate Ben Bailey and astronauts from other agencies, John McFall (ESA), Tracy Caldwell Dyson (NASA) and Rosemary Coogan (ESA).

Yoneda is currently awaiting assignment, and with NASA focused on the Artemis program, is a serious contender to being the first Japanese person on the moon. On November 3, 2026, she gave an interview to the Japan Times stating that if she is selected for a future Artemis mission, she would want to speak Japanese on the lunar surface.

== See also ==
- JAXA Astronaut Corps
- Women in space
