= Rosemary Coogan =

Northern Irish astrophysicist

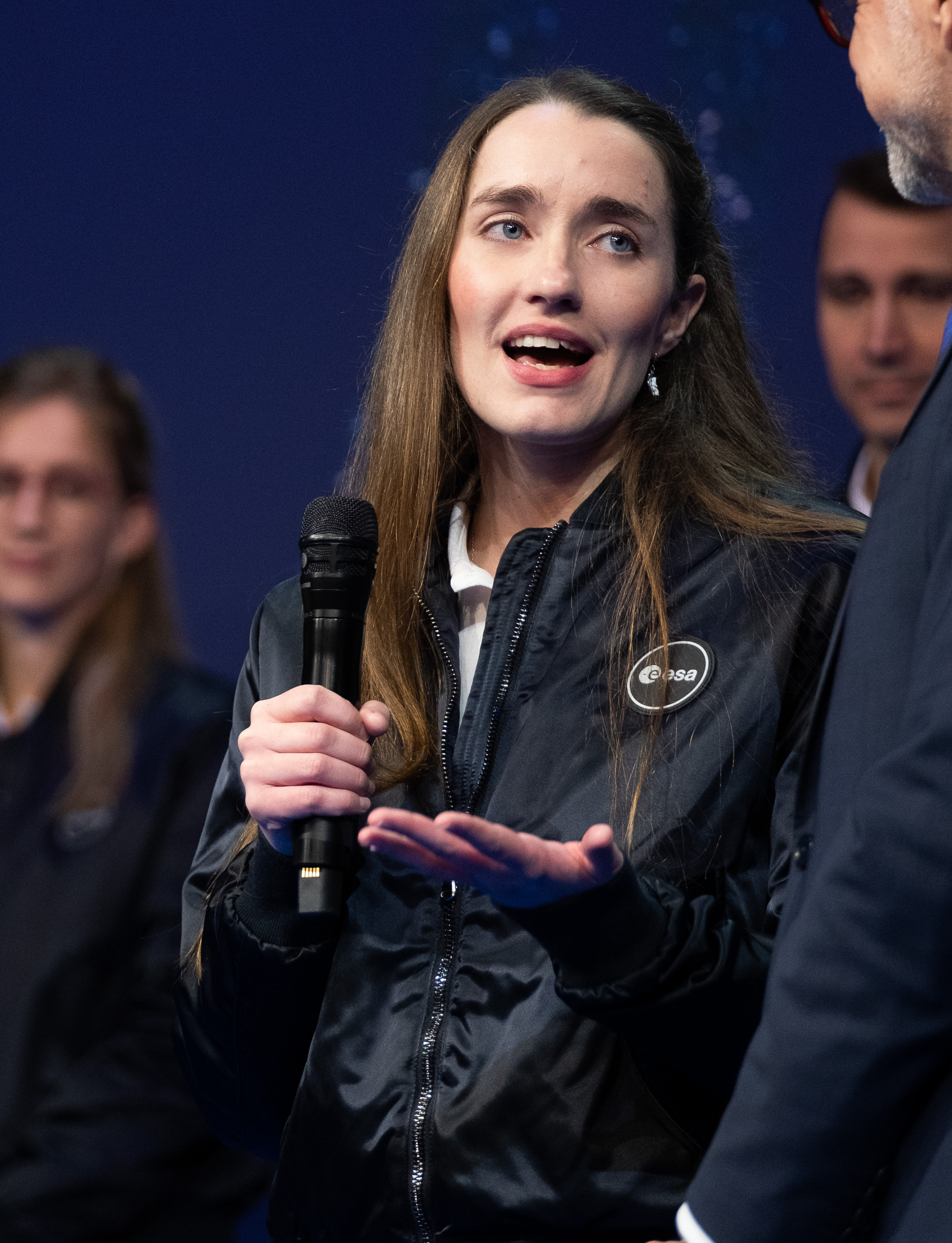
- Coogan in 2022
- Born: 1991 (age 34–35); Belfast, United Kingdom
- Education: University of Sussex (PhD); University College, Durham (MPhys, MSc)
- Scientific career
- Workplaces: Max Planck Institute for Extraterrestrial Physics; CNES
- Thesis: The impact of environment on galaxy evolution : starburst and AGN activity (2019)
- Space career

ESA astronaut
- Selection: 2022 ESA Group

Rosemary Theresa Coogan (born 1991) is an astrophysicist and UK astronaut from Northern Ireland. Her research considers galaxy evolution and space-based telescopes. She is part of ESA's European Astronaut Corps.

== Early life and education ==
Coogan was educated at Brighton & Hove High School, now Brighton Girls. She was involved with military training from a young age. She was trained as a petty officer with the Sea Cadets. In 2009 she joined HMS Calliope and HMS Example, where she was made an Officer cadet. She was later promoted to Midshipman of the Royal Naval Reserve.

Coogan studied for her undergraduate degree in Physics at University College, Durham. She graduated in 2013. She remained in Durham for her master's research, where she studied gamma-ray astronomy with Paula Chadwick. Her research involved observations using the Fermi Gamma-ray Space Telescope to study the 0.1 < E_{γ} < 300 GeV gamma-ray emission of radio quasars. Coogan also worked on data science during a work placement at Senseye. She worked as a simulation support engineer to develop machine learning models to detect anomalies from robotic sensors.

Coogan moved to the University of Sussex as a doctoral researcher, studying galaxy evolution and the activity of active galactic nuclei. She found that dense cluster environment increases the star formation efficiency, which she attributed to the high number of mergers, interactions and the active galactic nuclei. Toward the end of her doctorate, she attempted to inform future observations by constructing mock images of survey fields for the Square Kilometre Array.

== Career ==
Coogan moved to the Max Planck Institute for Extraterrestrial Physics. In Germany, Coogan studied galaxy evolution with space-based telescopes. In 2022, Coogan was appointed to the CNES, where she works on Euclid and James Webb Space Telescope.

In 2022, Coogan was selected by the European Astronaut Corps to join the 2022 European Space Agency Astronaut Group. She said that she applied to the space programme because she wanted to get "hands-on" with contributing the most that we can from space. Coogan completed ESA's Basic Training curriculum at the European Astronaut Centre, and graduated on 22 April 2024 alongside her classmates from "The Hoppers" group.

In June 2026, Coogan participated in the ESA CAVES 2026 course held in the Matese mountains in the Italian Apennines with her fellow astronauts Tracy Caldwell Dyson (NASA), Ayu Yoneda (JAXA), John McFall (ESA) and NASA astronaut candidate Ben Bailey.

In 2026, Coogan was awarded an honorary Doctor Of Science by Durham University.

== Selected publications ==
- Coogan, Rosemary Theresa; Daddi, Emanuele; Sargent, Mark; V Strazzullo; F Valentino; R Gobat; G Magdis; M Bethermin; Pannella, Maurilio; M Onodera; D Liu; Cimatti, Andrea; Dannerbauer, Helmut; Carollo, Marcella Carmen; Renzini, Q108556572; E Tremou (2018). "Merger driven star-formation activity in Cl J1449+0856 at z=1.99 as seen by ALMA and JVLA". Monthly Notices of the Royal Astronomical Society. arXiv:1805.09789. Bibcode:2018MNRAS.479..703C. doi:10.1093/mnras/sty1446. Wikidata Q58911747.
- A Zanella; Daddi, Emanuele; G Magdis; et al. (2018). "The [C ii] emission as a molecular gas mass tracer in galaxies at low and high redshifts". Monthly Notices of the Royal Astronomical Society. 481 (2): 1976–1999. arXiv:1808.10331. Bibcode:2018MNRAS.481.1976Z. doi:10.1093/mnras/sty2394. Wikidata Q58911729.
- J. M. Simpson; Smail, Ian; A. M. Swinbank; et al. (2019). "The East Asian Observatory SCUBA-2 Survey of the COSMOS Field: Unveiling 1147 Bright Sub-millimeter Sources across 2.6 Square Degrees". The Astrophysical Journal. 880 (1): 43. arXiv:1912.02229. Bibcode:2019ApJ...880...43S. doi:10.3847/1538-4357/ab23ff. Wikidata Q108805316.
