= Makoto Suwa =

JAXA astronaut

- 諏訪 理
- Born: 1977 (age 48–49); Tokyo, Japan
- Education: University of Tokyo; Duke University (MEM); Princeton University (PhD)
- Space career

JAXA astronaut
- Previous occupation: Climate scientist, World Bank
- Selection: 2023 JAXA Group

Makoto Suwa (Japanese: 諏訪 理, Hepburn: Suwa Makoto; born 1977 in Tokyo) is a Japanese climate scientist and astronaut with the Japan Aerospace Exploration Agency (JAXA).

== Early life ==
Suwa was born in Tokyo in 1977 and grew up in Tsukuba, Ibaraki. At a young age he visited the Expo 85 held at Tsukuba. While in elementary school he travelled to NASA where he met Apollo astronaut Gene Cernan.

== Education and career ==
Suwa graduated from the University of Tokyo in 1999. He received a Ph.D. in climate science from Princeton University, and a master of environment management degree from Duke University. In 2008, he joined the Japan Overseas Cooperation Volunteers and was dispatched to Rwanda, where he served as a lecturer at the Kigali Institute of Science and Technology. He then worked for the World Meteorological Organization, both at its Geneva headquarters and Office for Eastern and Southern Africa at Nairobi, Kenya. From 2014, he worked at the World Bank's Global Facility for Disaster Reduction and Recovery; at the time of his astronaut selection he held the role of Senior Disaster Risk Management Specialist.

On 28 February 2022, JAXA selected Suwa as an astronaut candidate alongside Ayu Yoneda. Chosen at the age of 46, he is the oldest JAXA astronaut candidate at the time of selection. He completed basic training and was certified for flight by JAXA on 21 October 2024.

In September 2025, Suwa participated in the ESA CAVES 2025 course held in the Matese mountains in the Italian Apennines.

On 9 January 2025, JAXA announced that Suwa would be assigned to a long-duration mission to the International Space Station (ISS) in 2027.

On 24 September 2026, NASA announced that Suwa was assigned as a mission specialist of the SpaceX Crew-14 mission to the International Space Station. He will fly as part of Expedition 75/76.
