= Mohammad Al Mulla =

Emirati astronaut (born 1988)

Mohammad AlMulla
- محمد الملا
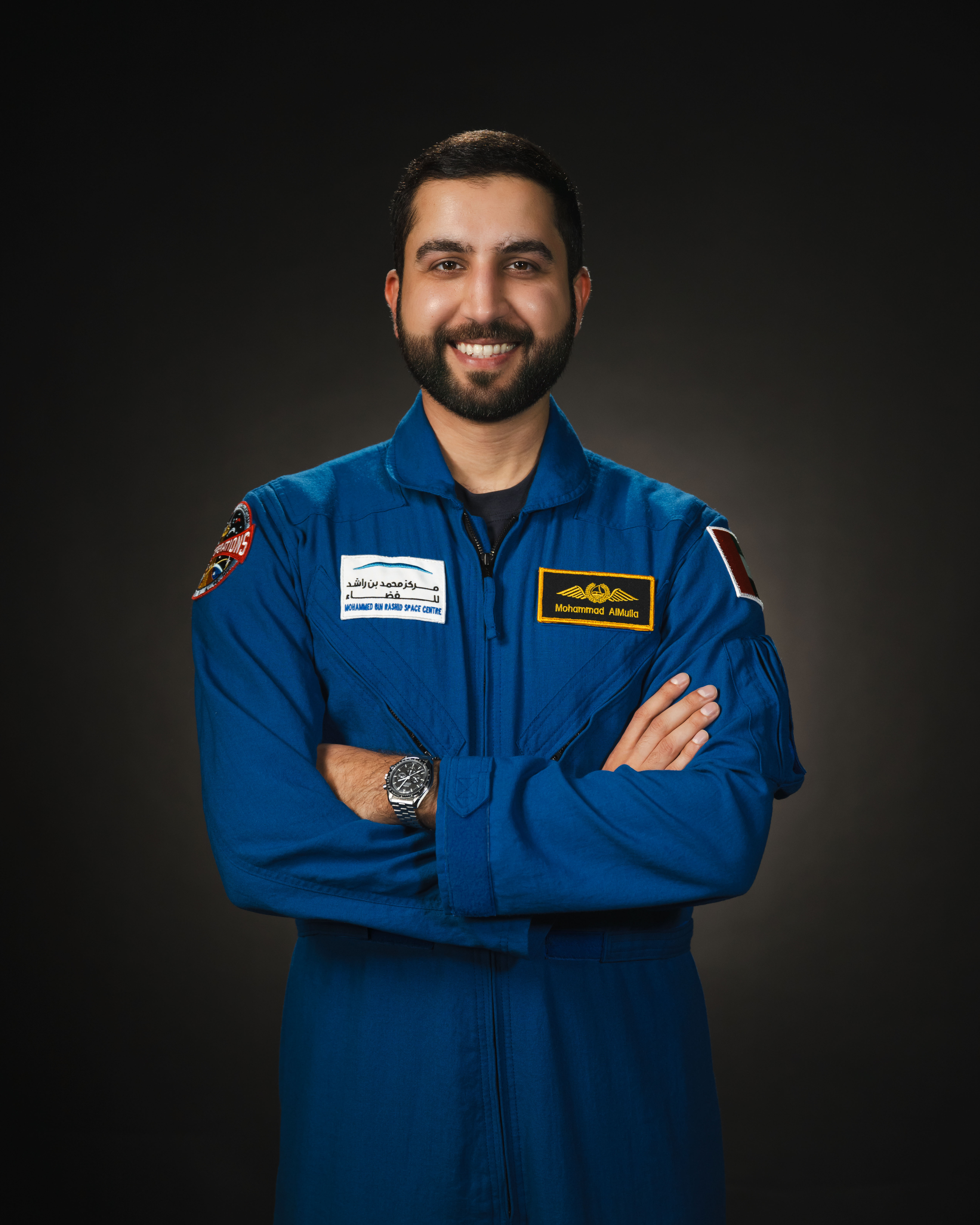
- AlMulla in 2024
- Born: 1988 (age 37–38)
- Space career

MBRSC astronaut
- Status: Active
- Selection: MBRSC Group 2 (2021); NASA Group 23 (2021)

Mohammad AlMulla (Arabic: محمد الملا; born in 1988) is an Emirati astronaut and one of the candidates selected as part of the second batch of the UAE Astronaut Programme. He graduated from the NASA Astronaut Candidate Class training programme and received the astronaut pin in 2024, establishing him as a fully qualified astronaut prepared for future space missions.

== Personal life ==
AlMulla's passion for space is interlinked with his love for aviation. His interest in the field was further prompted after the first batch of the UAE Astronaut Programme was announced and after meeting UAE astronauts: Hazzaa AlMansoori and Sultan AlNeyadi at an airshow in 2019. AlMulla considers Sheikh Hamdan bin Mohammed bin Rashid Al Maktoum his role model, and finds inspiration in his unique work ethic, management skills, and goal-oriented mindset. When it comes to space-exploration, AlMulla's role models are the Emirati astronauts Hazzaa AlMansoori and Sultan AlNeyadi. AlMulla lives by the saying: “The person who pursues their goal in life will achieve it, no matter how long it takes.” His dream is becoming part of the first Emirati space team to explore the Moon and hopes to train astronauts in a dedicated centre in the future.

Some of AlMulla's other hobbies include football, photography, chess, the last is a game he has been playing for over 20 years.

== Education and Professional Career ==
Born in Dubai in 1988, by the age of 19, AlMulla had obtained a commercial pilot’s license from the UAE General Civil Aviation Authority (GCAA), making him the youngest pilot in Dubai Police. By the age of 28, he had set another record by becoming the youngest trainer in the same organization after receiving his pilot trainer license from GCAA. He obtained a Bachelor's Degree in Law and Economics in 2015 and an Executive Master's of Public Administration from the Mohammed Bin Rashid School of Government in 2021. With over 15 years of experience, he also served as the Head of Training Department at the Air Wing Centre at Dubai Police.

== Achievements ==
AlMulla was given a Bravery Medal by Sheikh Mohammed bin Rashid Al Maktoum, and he was also given the Commander in Chief Award for Best Officer in a Specialised Field, as well as the Dubai Police Global Excellence Award.

== The UAE Astronaut Programme ==
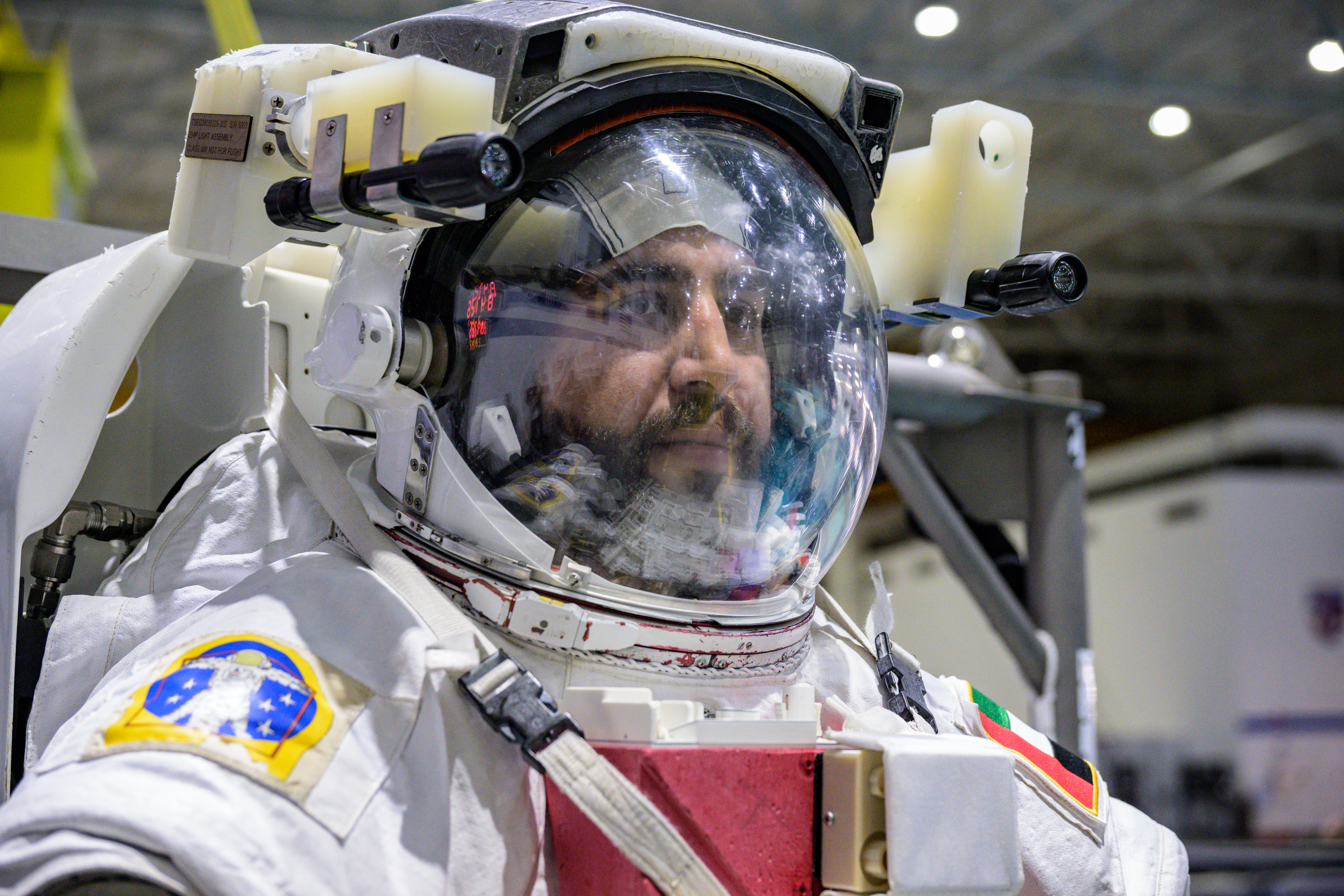
Mohammad AlMulla in Topside Suitup at the NBL, 2023.

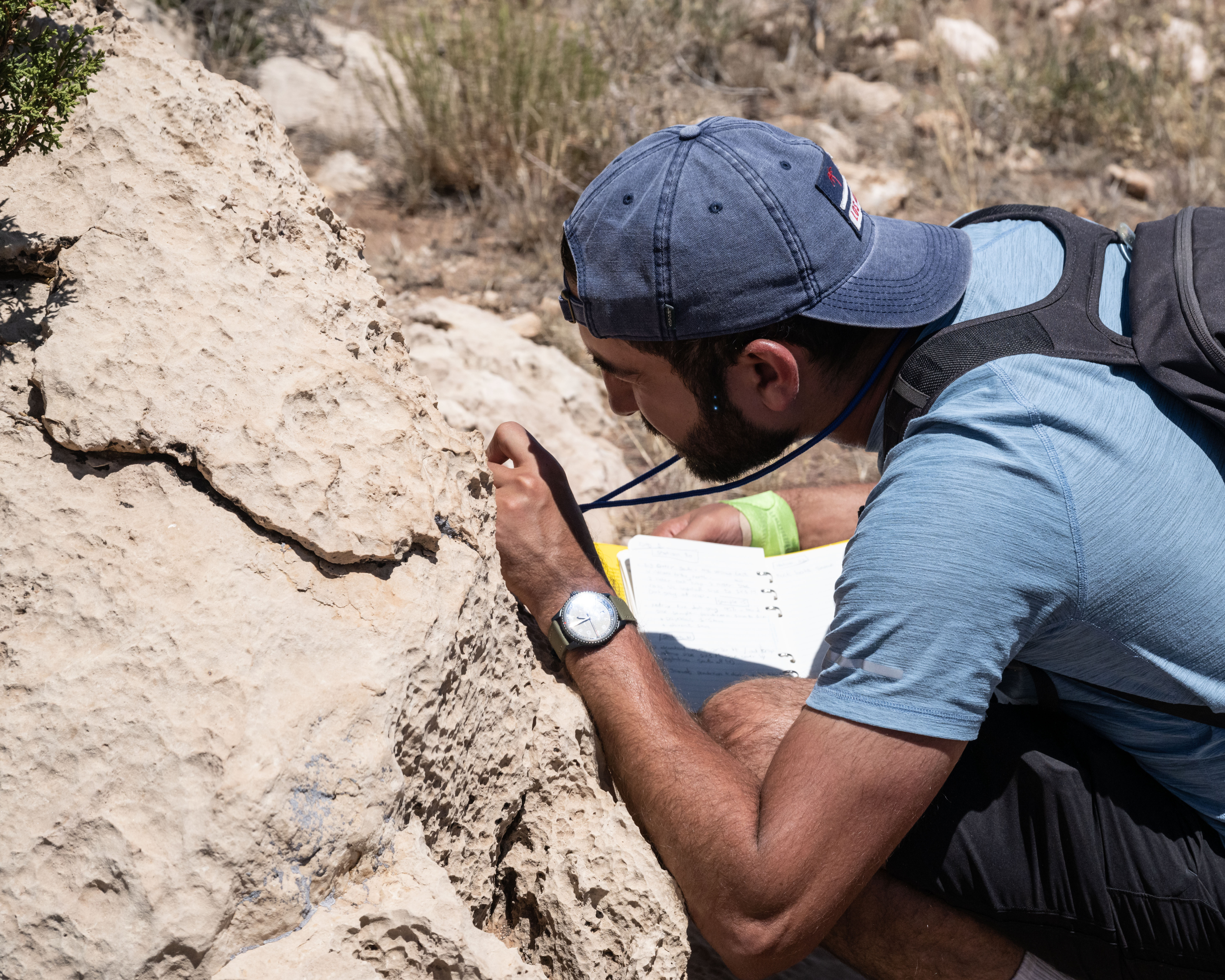
Mohammad AlMulla, Earth & Planetary Science Training, 2023.

The UAE Astronaut Programme is one of the projects managed by the Mohammed Bin Rashid Space Centre (MBRSC) under the UAE’s National Space Programme and funded by the ICT Fund of the Telecommunications and Digital Government Regulatory Authority (TDRA). The Programme aims to support research and development in the ICT sector in the UAE and foster the country’s global integration.

AlMulla was one of the two astronauts selected in the second batch of the UAE Astronaut Programme. The programme was launched by H.H. Sheikh Mohammed bin Zayed Al Nahyan, President of the UAE, and H.H. Sheikh Mohammed bin Rashid Al Maktoum, Vice President and Prime Minister of the UAE and Ruler of Dubai. After undergoing a series of rigorous mental and physical tests in the UAE and abroad, he was chosen from a pool of over 4,000 applicants.

== Training ==
Prior to joining the NASA Astronaut Candidate Class training programme, AlMulla underwent extensive in-house training at MBRSC. The preparatory phase included swimming, scuba diving, survival exercises and stamina improvement, laying a solid foundation for his subsequent NASA training. As part of his preparation for future space missions, AlMulla began training with NASA's 10-member Astronaut Candidate Class of 2021, alongside astronaut Nora AlMatrooshi at the Johnson Space Center in Houston, USA in 2022. The training spanned two years and covered five major categories, including spacewalking at the Neutral Buoyancy Lab, robotics, the systems of the International Space Station, piloting the T-38 training jet and Russian language lessons. He also engaged in advanced training exercises such as survival training at Alabama's Fort Novosel and lessons on Earth’s geology, vital for understanding geological structures on other planets and deducing their geological history.

In September 2025, AlMulla participated in the ESA CAVES 2025 course held in the Matese mountains in the Italian Apennines.

== See also ==
- Timeline of space travel by nationality
- UAE Space Agency
