= Ben Bailey (astronaut) =

American astronaut candidate

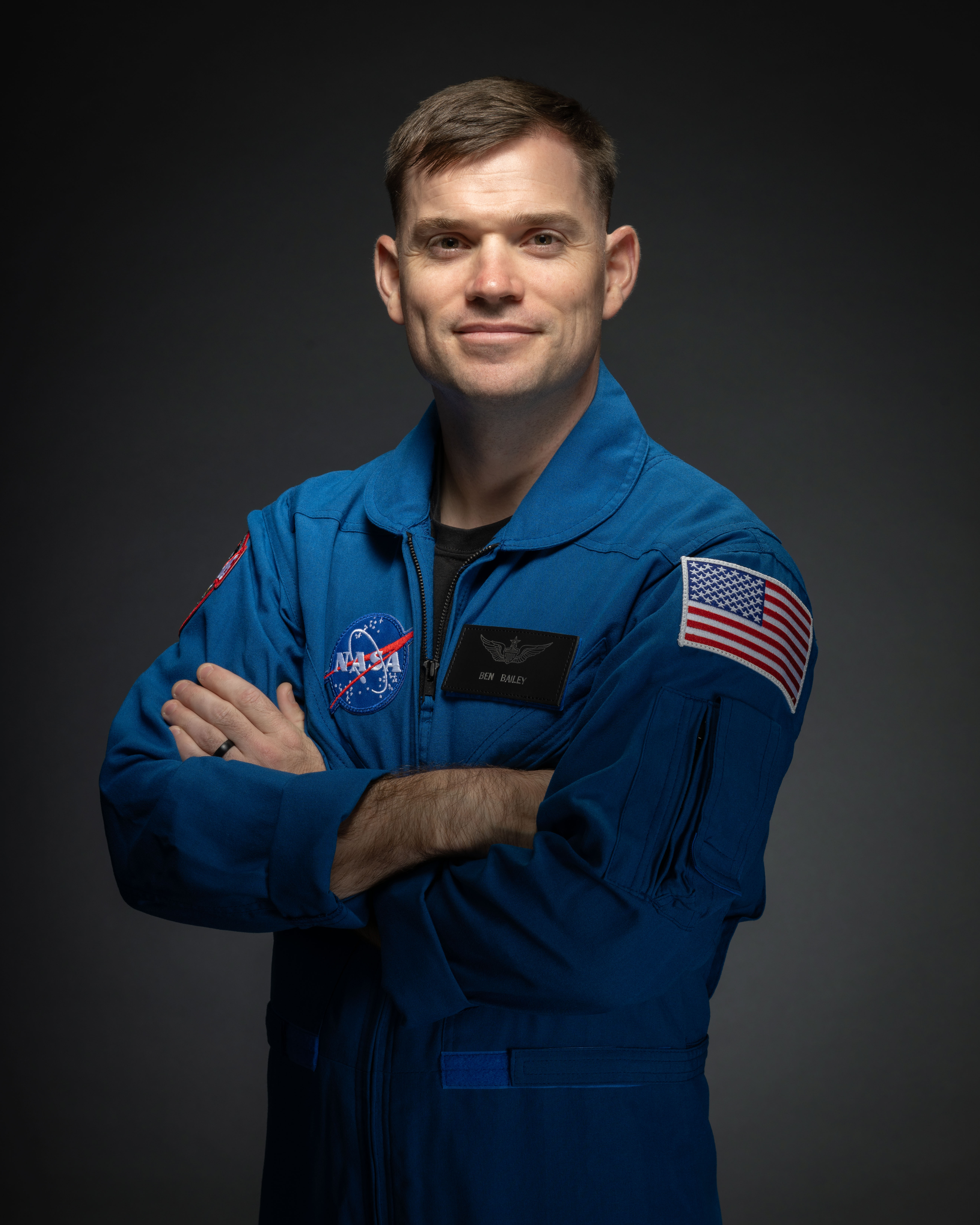
- Bailey in 2025
- Born: Joseph Benjamin Bailey; August 7, 1987 (age 39); Charlottesville, Virginia, U.S.
- Education: University of Virginia (BS); Naval Postgraduate School
- Space career

NASA astronaut candidate
- Rank: CW3, U.S. Army
- Selection: NASA Group 24 (2025)

Ben Bailey is an American military test pilot, engineer, and NASA astronaut candidate. Born in Charlottesville, Virginia, and educated at the University of Virginia, he worked as a professional engineer before pursuing Army aviation.

After joining the United States Army as a warrant officer and qualifying as a rotary wing aviator and experimental test pilot, he was announced as a member of NASA Astronaut Group 24 in 2025, becoming the first warrant officer selected for astronaut training.

== Education and early career ==
Bailey attended the University of Virginia, earning a Bachelor of Science degree in mechanical engineering. After graduation in 2009, he worked as a nuclear engineer on the nuclear propulsion plants for aircraft carriers. As of 2025, he was working toward a Master of Science degree in systems engineering at the Naval Postgraduate School.

== Military career ==
Bailey joined the U.S. Army as an aviation warrant officer and began initial entry rotary wing training at Fort Rucker to qualify as a helicopter pilot. From 2016 to 2022, Bailey was assigned to Joint Base Lewis–McChord as a UH-60M Black Hawk pilot.

In 2022, following fixed-wing transition training, he graduated from the U.S. Naval Test Pilot School where he received the Commander Willie McCool award as the top performing student in Class 161. He then served at the U.S. Army Redstone Test Center, Aviation Flight Test Directorate, as an experimental test pilot responsible for evaluating new technologies in the UH-60 and Boeing CH-47 Chinook airframes. As of his astronaut selection in 2025, Bailey was a senior-rated Army aviator with more than 2,000 flight hours across 30 different airframes including both rotary and fixed-wing.

== NASA career ==
In September 2025, Bailey was selected as a member of NASA Astronaut Group 24, becoming the first warrant officer selected for the NASA Astronaut Corps, and the second selected for spaceflight, following CW4 Thomas J. Hennen, who flew a mission as a payload specialist in 1991. He reported for duty at NASA's Johnson Space Center in September 2025 to begin the two year course of training.

In June 2026, in collaboration with the European Space Agency, he took part in the ESA CAVES 2026 training programme alongside NASA astronaut Tracy Caldwell Dyson (NASA) and astronauts from other agencies, John McFall (ESA), Ayu Yoneda (JAXA) and Rosemary Coogan (ESA).
