= NASA Astronaut Group 23 =

2021 human spaceflight selection of 12 candidates; "The Flies"

The Flies
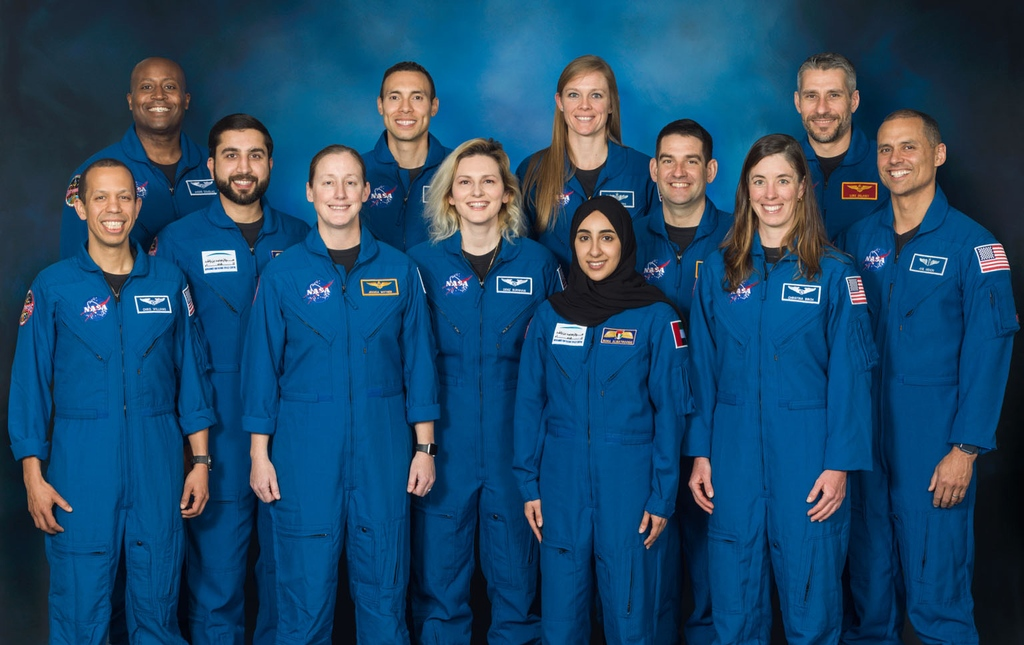
- Year selected: 2021
- Number selected: 12

NASA Astronaut Group 23 (nicknamed "The Flies") was announced on December 6, 2021, with the class reporting for duty in January 2022. Twelve astronaut candidates were selected, including seven men and five women.

== History ==
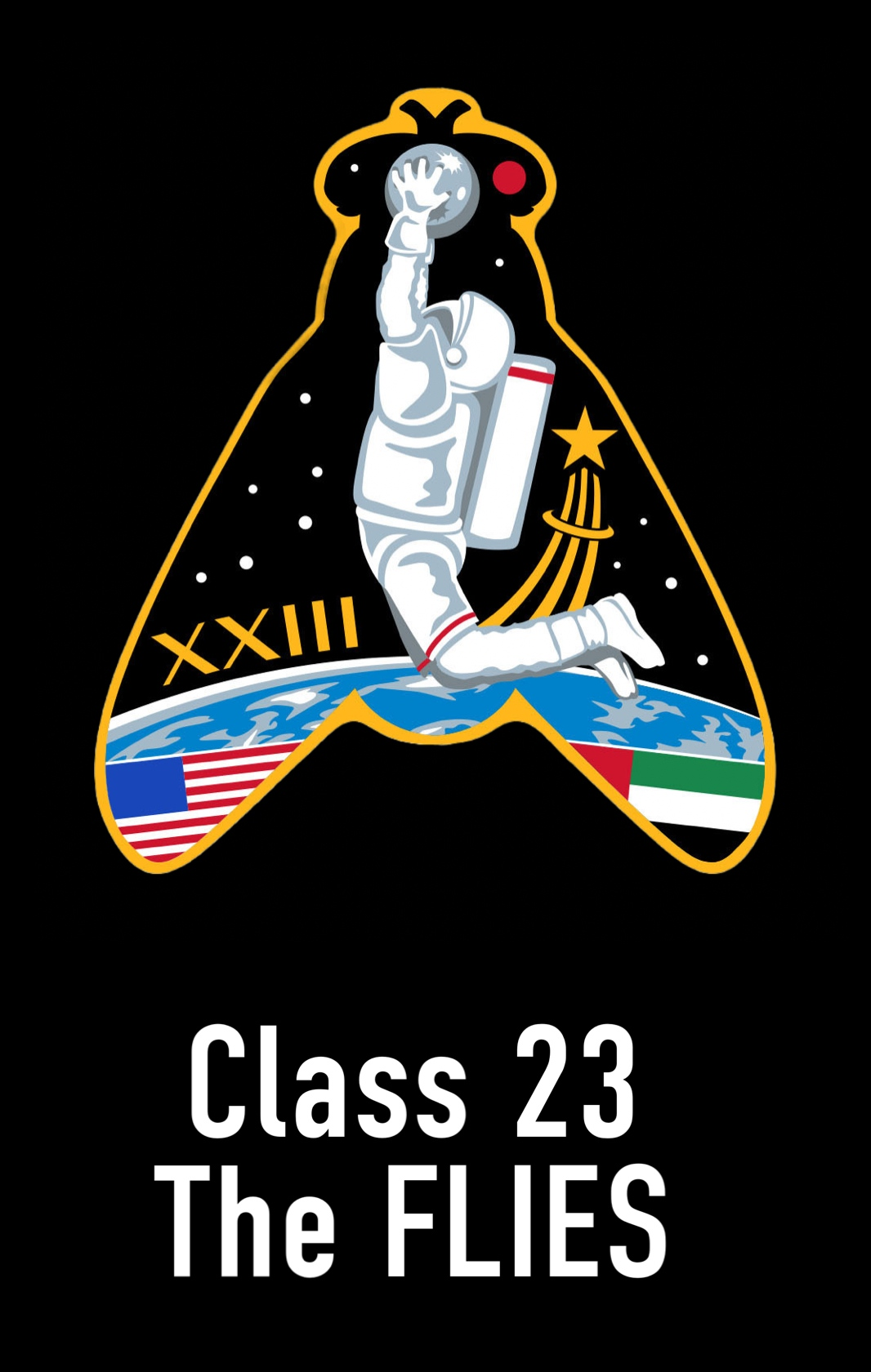
Group patch

NASA announced the creation of this astronaut group in February 2020 and accepted applications for astronaut hires during the month of March 2020. For this class, the educational requirements increased to be at minimum a master's degree in a STEM field (engineering, biological science, physical science, computer science, or mathematics) from an accredited institution; in classes prior to this, a bachelor's degree was all that was required. Additionally, a 2-hour online assessment was required for the first time. Over 12,000 applications were received by NASA, coming from all 50 states plus the District of Columbia and four U.S. territories.

The Group 23 astronaut candidates were originally planned to arrive at the Johnson Space Center in Houston for training in the summer of 2021, and with the completion of their approximately two-year-long training program, they would become available for future missions to the International Space Station in low Earth orbit aboard NASA or commercial crew vehicles, the Moon via the Artemis program, and Mars. However, due to complications with interviewing potential applicants in person due to COVID-19 restrictions at JSC, the announcement of the new class was pushed back twice:

- In August 2020, the agency revised the timetable, pushing the final announcement date from summer to late 2021. As of the August 2020 revision, several rounds of interviews were to have been conducted in Houston between February and September 2021, with the announcement of the Class of 2021 in October or November and their arrival at JSC for training in December.
- In March 2021, the agency again revised the timetable: on-site interviews scheduled for summer 2021, with the new class announcement in late 2021 and the new class reporting in 2022.

The selection of Group 23 was announced on December 6, 2021, with training to commence in January 2022.

Two Emirati candidates, Nora Al Matrooshi and Mohammad Al Mulla, selected by the MBRSC, took part in training as international partner astronauts. Hazza Al Mansouri – who already went to space on board Soyuz MS-15 – and candidate Sultan Al Neyadi were already training at NASA since before the 23rd group was chosen, but only Nora and Mohammad are considered part of the group 23.

== Group members ==
External videos
- Astronaut Class of 2021 Official Announcement December 6, 2021

External videos
- NASA's Astronaut Graduation 2024 March 5, 2024

- Nichole Ayers: Air Force fighter jet pilot
  - Pilot, SpaceX Crew-10 (Expedition 72/73)
- Marcos Berríos: Air Force helicopter test pilot
- Christina Birch: Bioengineer, Team USA Track Cyclist
  - Pilot, SpaceX Crew-14 (Expedition 75/76) – planned
- Deniz Burnham: Drilling engineer
  - Flight engineer, Soyuz MS-30 (Expedition 75/76) – planned
- Luke Delaney: NASA Langley research pilot
  - Pilot, SpaceX Crew-13 (Expedition 75)
- Andre Douglas: Space systems engineer
  - Mission specialist, Artemis III – planned
- Jack Hathaway: Navy test pilot
  - Pilot, SpaceX Crew-12 (Expedition 74/75)
- Anil Menon: Air Force flight surgeon, SpaceX medical director
  - Flight engineer, Soyuz MS-29 (Expedition 74/75)
- Christopher Williams: Medical physicist
  - Flight engineer, Soyuz MS-28 (Expedition 73/74)
- Jessica Wittner: Navy test pilot, research engineer

== United Arab Emirates partner astronauts ==
The U.S. astronauts trained alongside two astronaut candidates from the United Arab Emirates:

- Nora Al Matrooshi: Mechanical engineer
- Mohammad Al Mulla: Helicopter pilot

== See also ==
- 2022 European Space Agency Astronaut Group
- List of astronauts by year of selection
