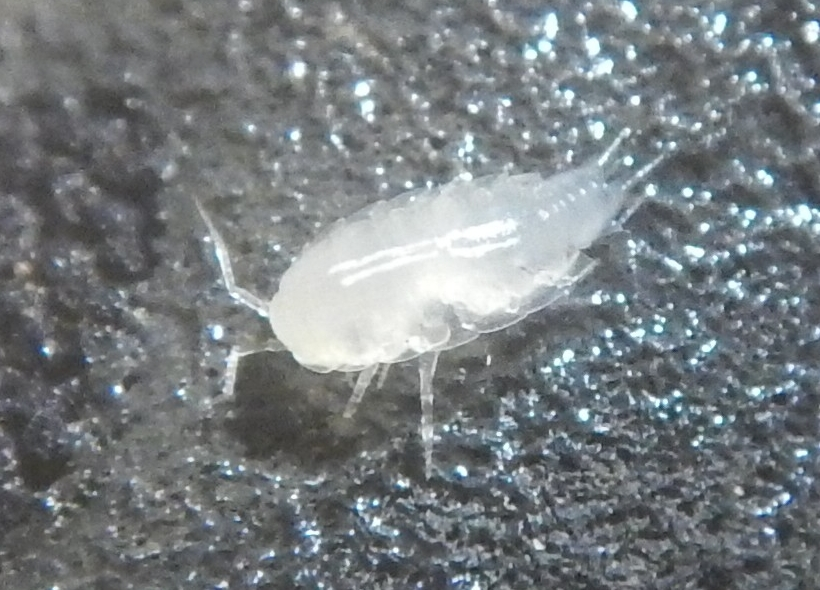

Scientific classification
- Kingdom: Animalia
- Phylum: Arthropoda
- Clade: Pancrustacea
- Class: Malacostraca
- Order: Isopoda
- Suborder: Oniscidea
- Family: Trichoniscidae
- Genus: Alpioniscus
- Species: A. sideralis

Binomial name
- Alpioniscus sideralis Taiti & Argano, 2018

= Alpioniscus sideralis =

Species of woodlouse

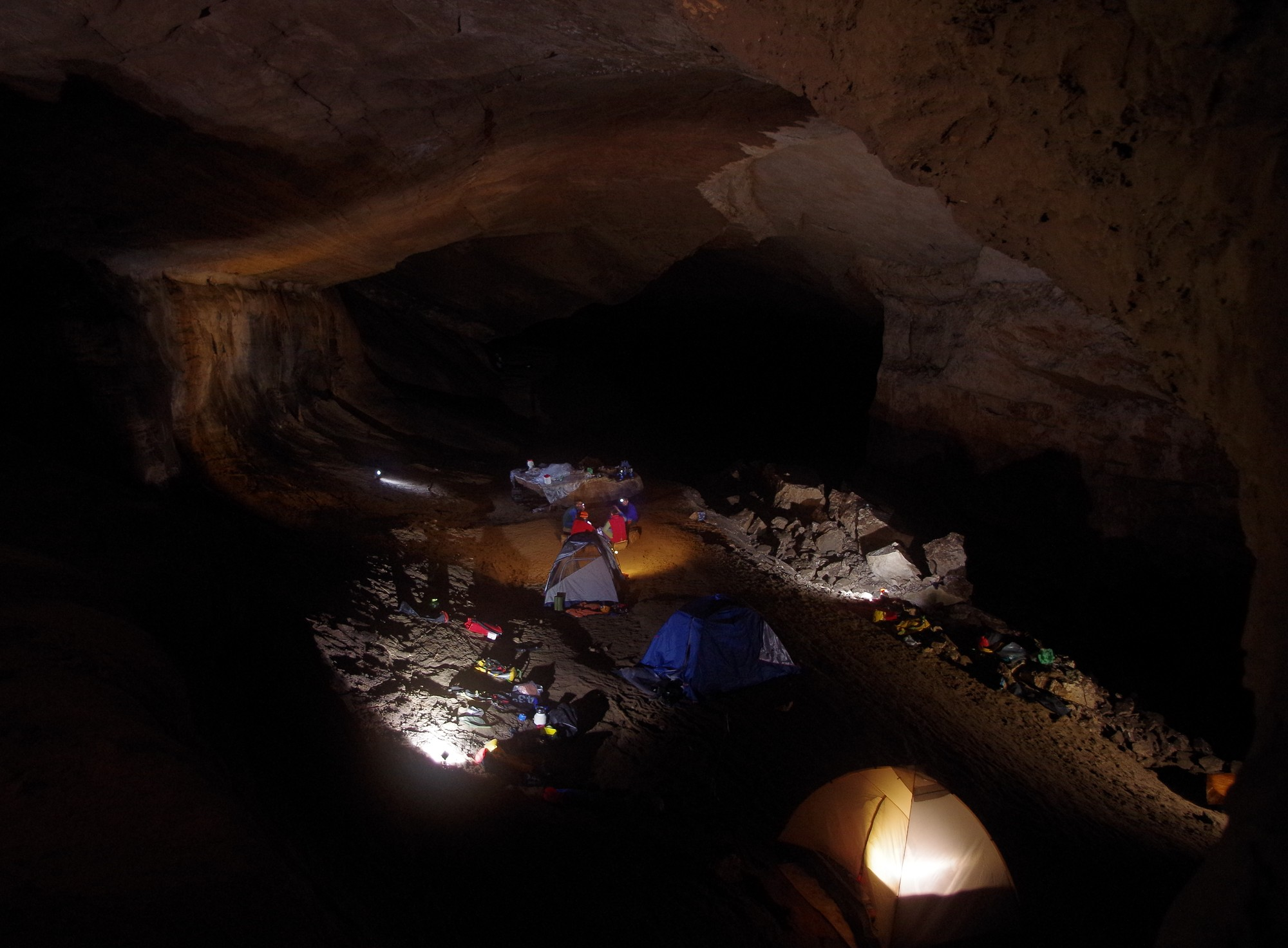
ESA CAVES 2012 base camp

Alpioniscus sideralis is a species of freshwater, cave-dwelling woodlice. It was first collected in a karstic Su Bantu cave in Supramonte, Sardinia by a group of astronauts during a subterranean training course CAVES organized by the European Space Agency (ESA) in 2012. The species was formally described in a ZooKeys publication in 2018.

== Morphology ==
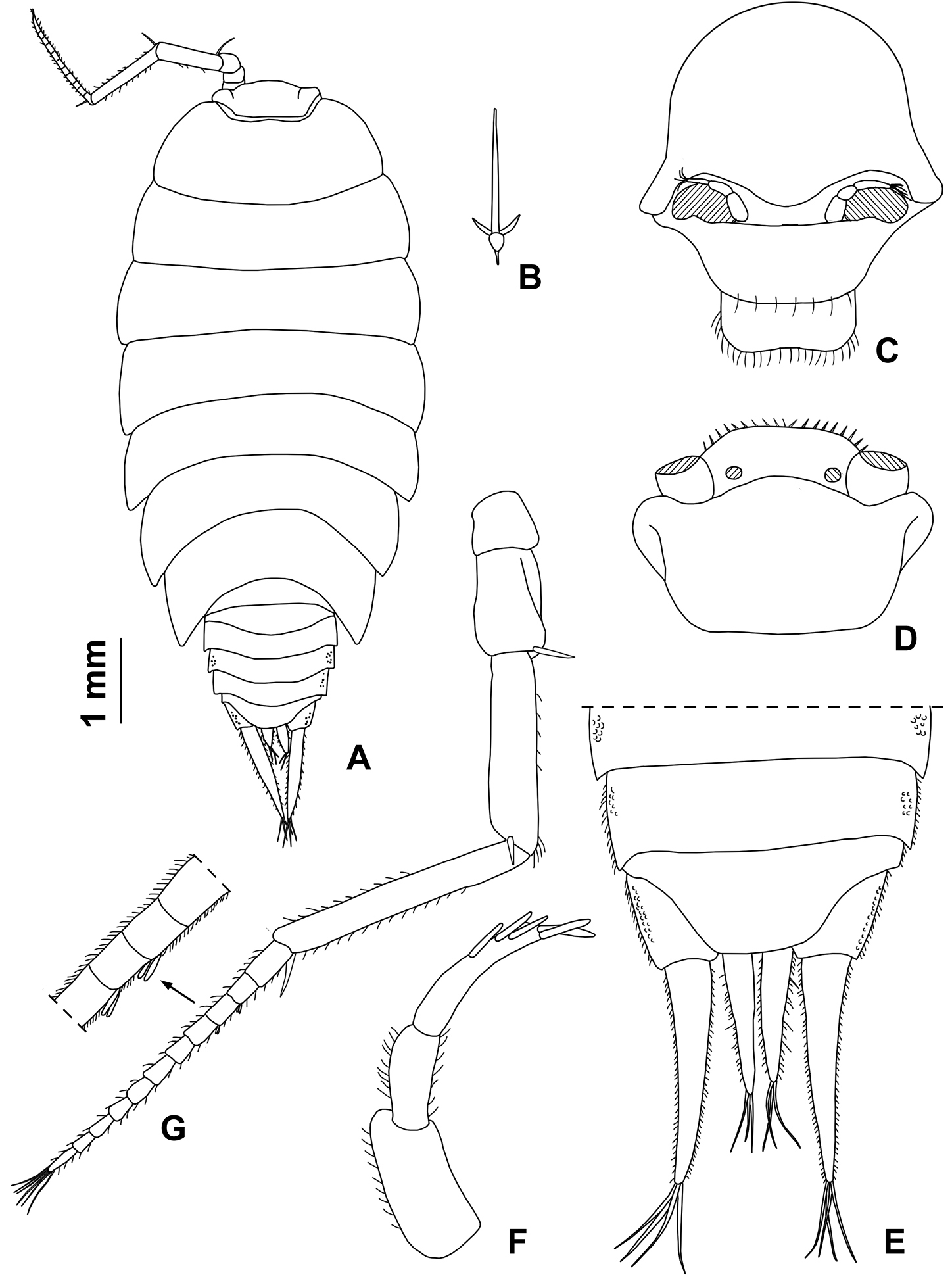
Alpioniscus sideralis from Grotta Su Bentu, male paratype

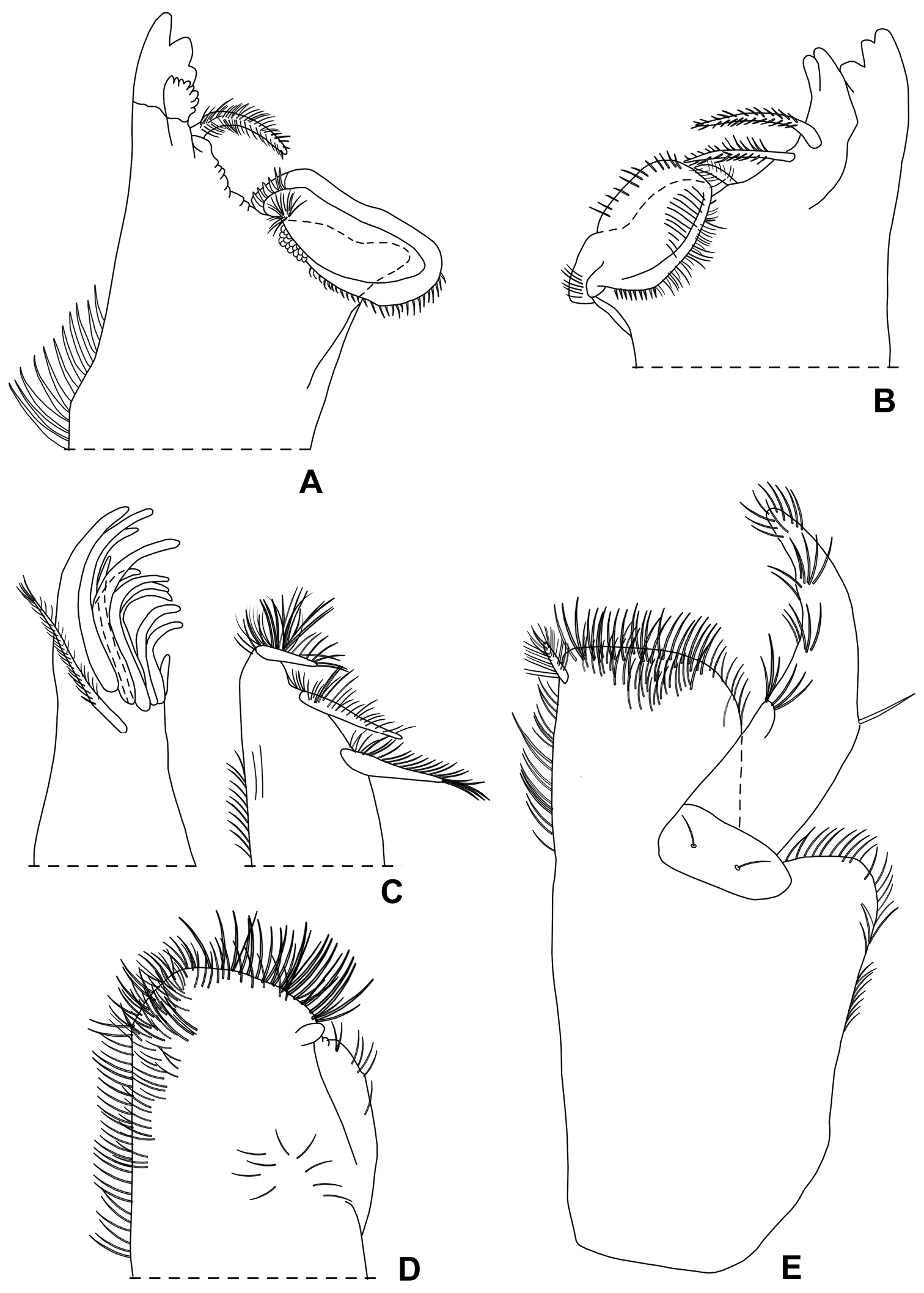
Alpioniscus sideralis from Grotta Su Bentu, male paratype: mouthparts

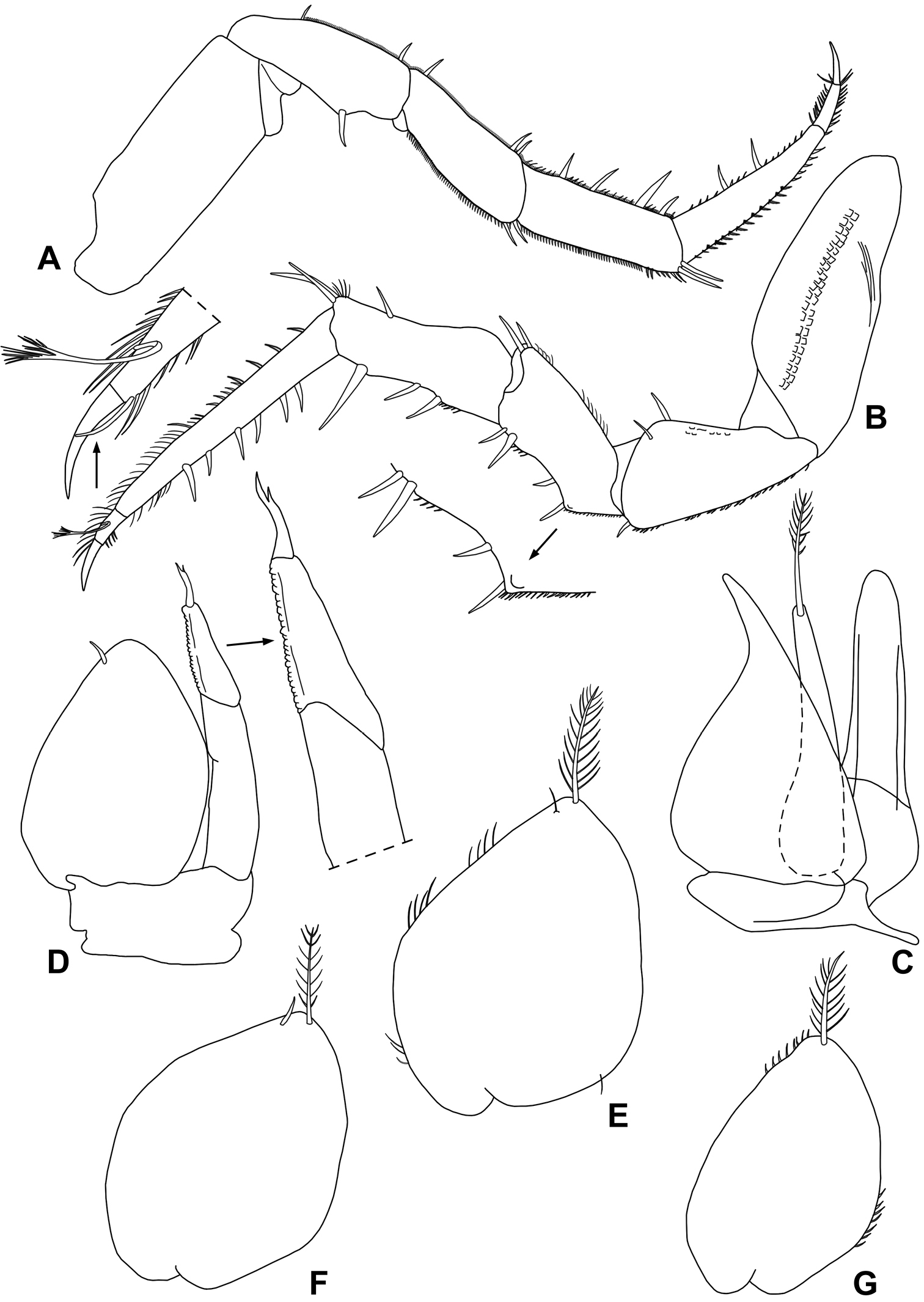
Alpioniscus sideralis from Grotta Su Bentu, male paratype: limbs

== See also ==
- Stygofauna
