= ESA CAVES =

European Space Agency astronaut training course

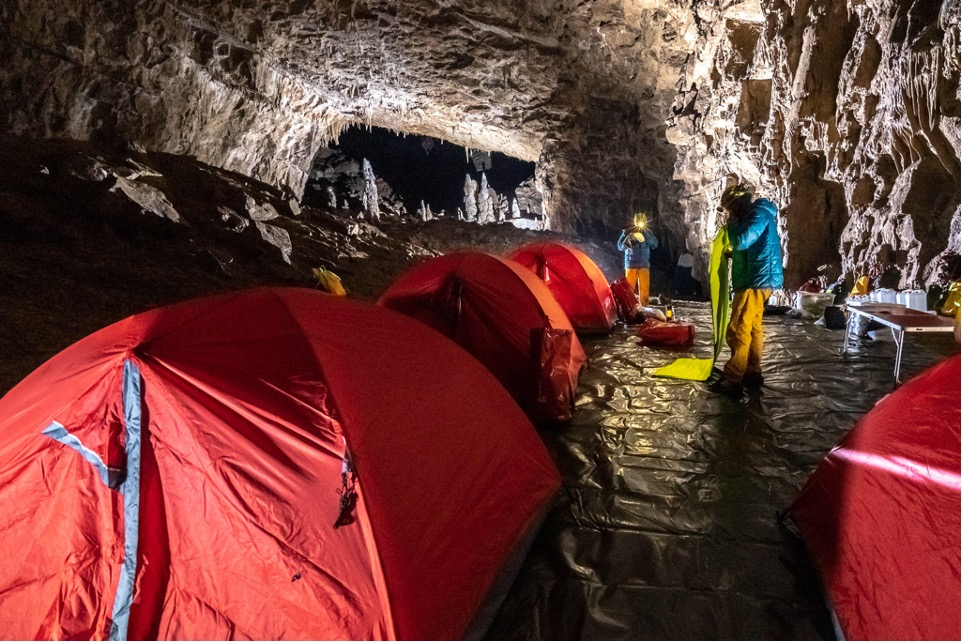
CAVES 2019: astronaut base camp in the cave interior

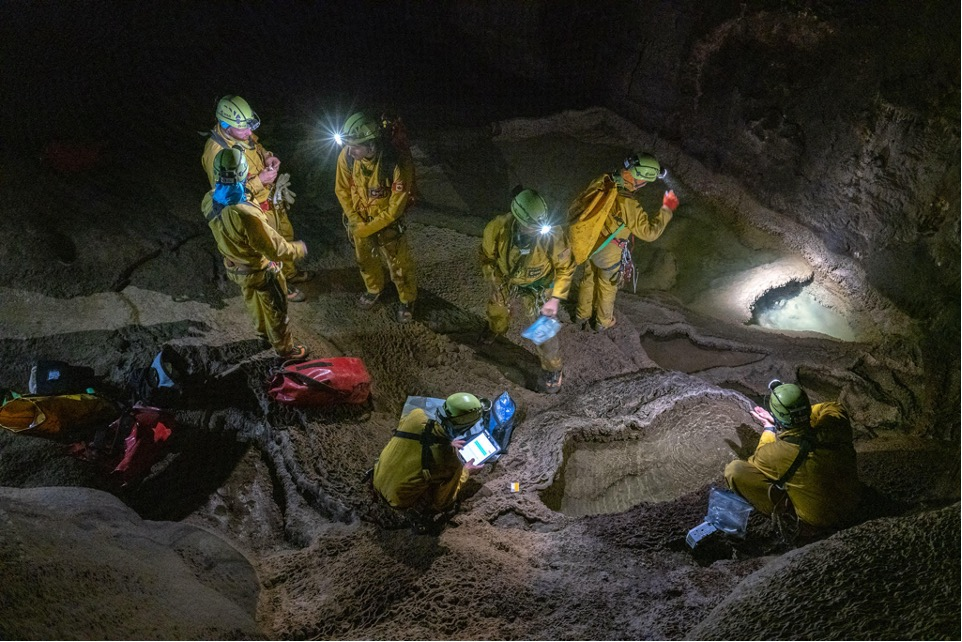
Astronauts looking for water and microbiological samples during CAVES

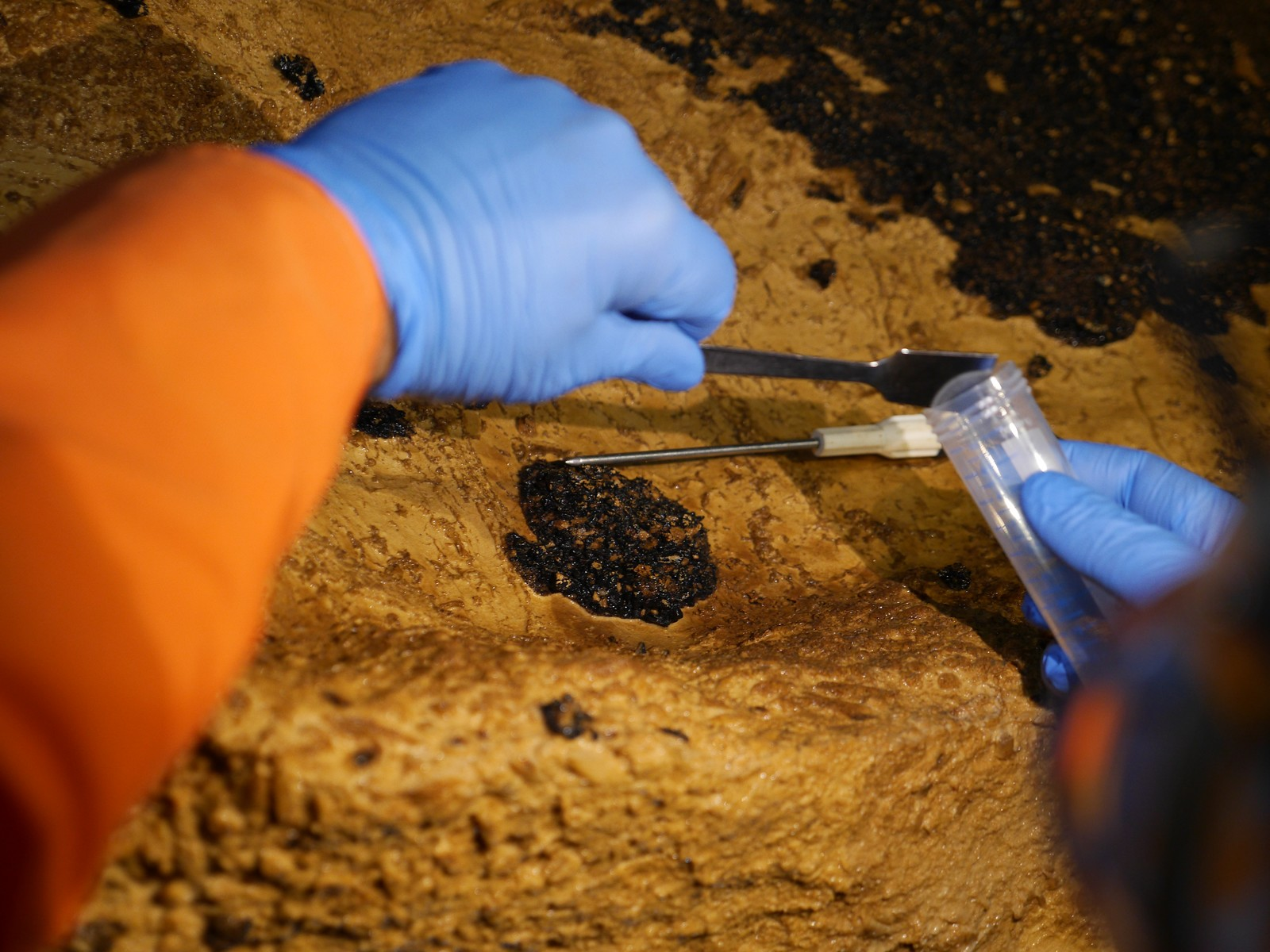
Microbiological sampling

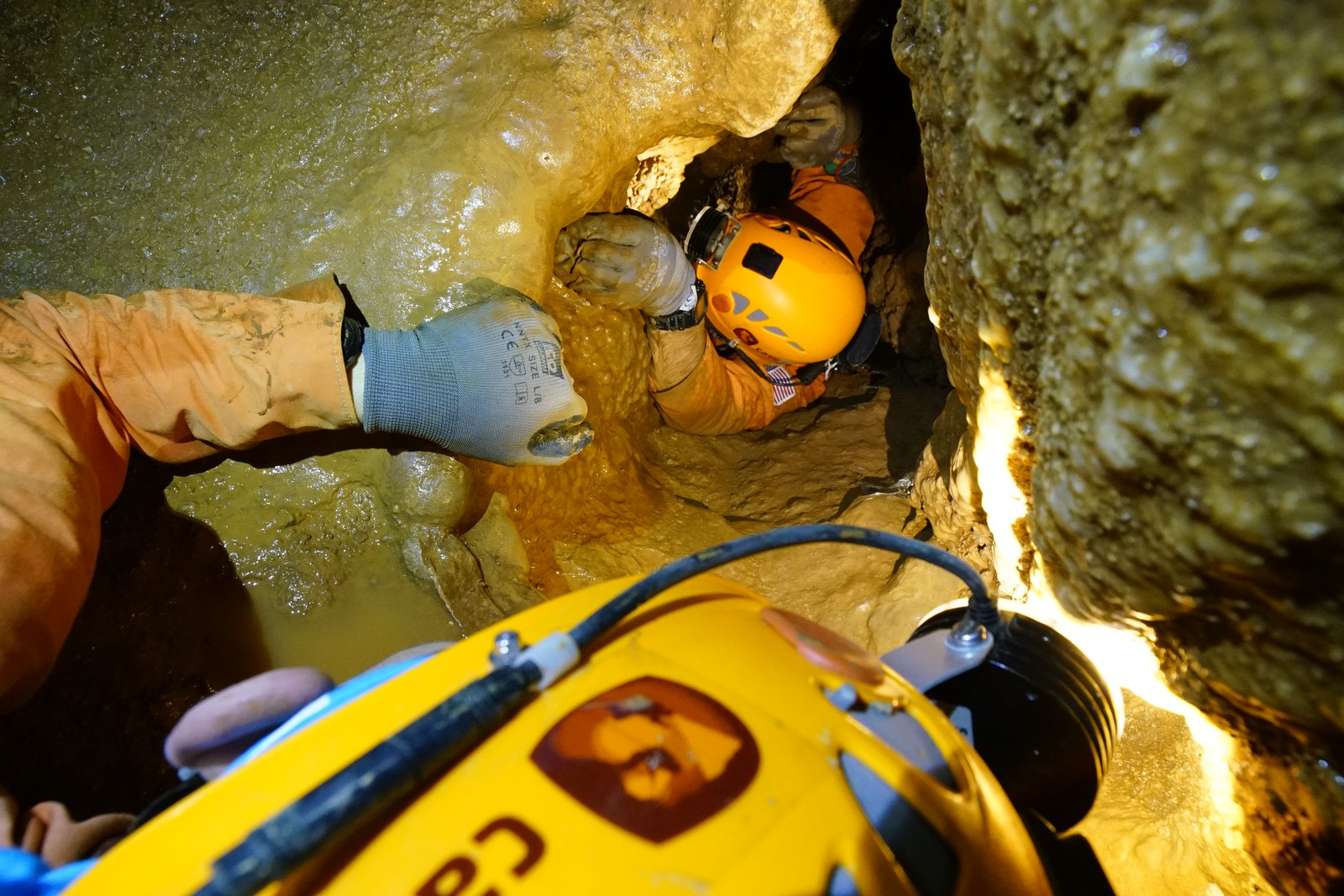
Astronaut in a squeeze during CAVES

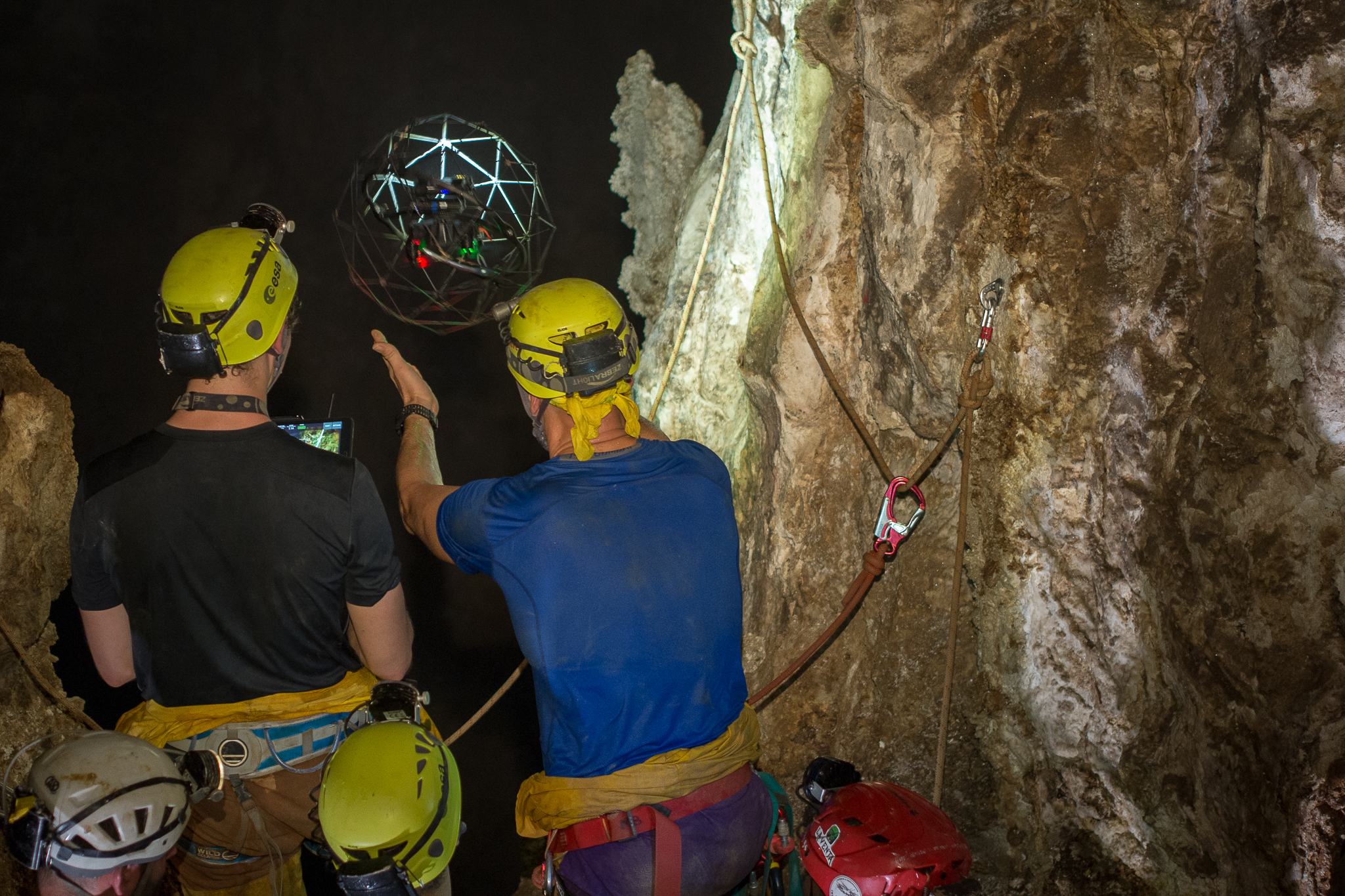
CAVES 2017: launching a drone

CAVES (Cooperative Adventure for Valuing and Exercising human behaviour and performance Skills) is a European Space Agency (ESA) astronaut training course in which international astronauts train in a space-analogue cave environment. Designed at the European Astronaut Centre, the course aims to prepare astronauts for safe and efficient long duration spaceflight operations by means of a realistic scientific and exploration mission within a multicultural, ISS-representative team.

== Location ==
The first five editions of CAVES (2011, 2012, 2013, 2014, and 2016) took place in several caves on the Italian island of Sardinia, part of a Karst System which lies within the Supramonte region. The rocks in this area are predominantly limestone and dolomite.

The 2019 edition of CAVES was carried out in the so-called “Classical Karst” area, a karst region between Italy and Slovenia, world famous for its limestone caves. Here, the course makes use of facilities provided by Škocjanske Caves Regional Park, with field activities occurring in several caves along the underground course of the river Timavo, both in Italy and Slovenia.

The 2025 and 2026 editions of CAVES were carried out in the Matese mountains of the Italian Apennines.

== Objectives ==
The CAVES training has the following training objectives for its participants:

- Working together effectively in a challenging environment
- Adapting to a lack of comfort and privacy
- Exploring the cave
- Conducting scientific and technological research
- Managing logistical problems and coping with limited resources
- Facing the psychological effects of the mission
- Handling critical situations
- Being aware of safety requirements at all times
- Training the participants in leadership skills

== Space analogue ==
The cave environment is an exceptional space analogue. It recreates on Earth many of the stressful conditions and specific characteristics encountered in long duration spaceflight, such as:

- Unknown / unfamiliar environment – The crew's knowledge about the cave is limited to what previous expeditions have found and documented.
- Permanent darkness / need for artificial illumination.
- Lack of time references – A direct consequence of the cave's permanent darkness.
- Alteration of circadian rhythm and sleep disturbance – The lack of time references and limited facilities affect sleep quality and cycles length.
- Sensory alteration / deprivation – Not only are caves lightless, they also provide almost no auditory or olfactory stimuli.
- Limited privacy – Small, confined spaces do not offer much room for privacy or personal space for team members.
- Social and cultural aspects / crew size – The teams include astronauts from ESA, NASA, Roscosmos, CSA, JAXA, CNSA, and MBRSC so the team dynamics that emerge during the mission are similar to those expected on an international cooperative space mission.
- Limited resources / hygiene – The logistics inside the cave is extremely complex, only limited supplies can be carried inside.
- Isolation / Limited communication with outside world – Communications with the outside world are limited to interactions with the mission support team over delay to enhance the sense of isolation.
- High level of autonomy – The crew must operate with few inputs from outside whilst exploring.
- Real physical danger – Even implementing all reasonable safety measures, caves still present risks to human explorers, including falling, slipping, rock falls, or becoming trapped by landslides or floodings. Participants must be constantly aware of these risks.
- Limited mission abort / rescue capabilities – Given the complexity of the environment, both evacuation and rescue operations require several hours or even days to plan and execute.

Another parallel with space exploration concerns astronaut progression within the cave, i.e., how they move through the environment. Speleological techniques involve safety principles similar to that of an EVA, such as the need to be attached to a safe surface – the cave wall in CAVES, the ISS or a vehicle in space. The crew mission performed during the final expedition also has several elements in common with astronaut's experience during ISS operations, including a time-lined activities schedule, daily planning calls to the ground support team, and standardised procedures and data collection methods.

== Crew mission ==
Each training course lasts for approximately three weeks. The first two weeks focus on providing the astronauts with the necessary behavioural patterns, scientific knowledge, and technical skills to work effectively and safely in an underground environment. During this time, trainees visit simple caves to become acquainted with the conditions they will find themselves in during their final expedition, a six-day uninterrupted expedition exploring a complex cave system. The main purpose of the mission is to foster their communication, decision-making, problem-solving, leadership and team dynamics capabilities by means of team activities and a real crew mission performed in a space-like environment.

In the same way astronauts in space spend a considerable part of their time doing science, "cavenauts" must perform a real crew mission involving several different experiments and activities while exploring the cave. After team training, conducting scientific, and technological research is the secondary objectives of the CAVES course. The third objective is to further explore and document previously unknown areas of the cave.

=== Mission programme ===
- Geology (analysis of water's chemical and physical properties, counting of drip rate)
- Environment (measurement of air temperature / relative humidity / wind / air pressure / CO_{2} concentration / radon concentration)
- Microbiology (sampling of microorganisms in soil and on surfaces for later cultivation)
- Biology (counting and sampling of cave terrestrial and aquatic fauna, search for micro-crustaceans, search for fauna in the soil)
- Technology testing (underground communication devices, physiology sensors)
- Cave documentation (photos and 3D survey of the cave, photogrammetry modeling of relevant speleothems)

== Results ==
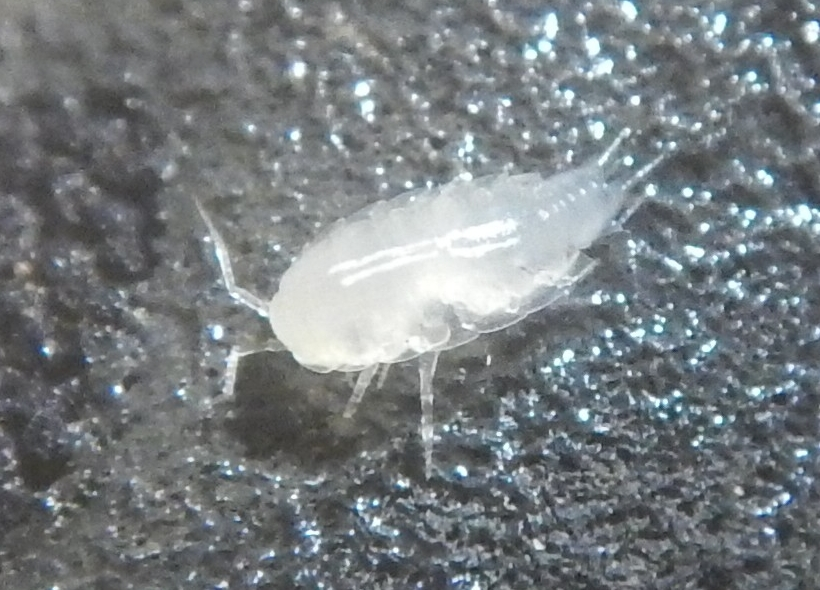
Alpioniscus sideralis discovered by astronauts during CAVES 2012

One of the most remarkable scientific results is the discovery of Alpioniscus sideralis, a previously unknown species of crustaceans living in the cave.

Results from the first five editions are available on the ESA Erasmus Experiment Archive, divided by year:

- EEA CAVES 2011
- EEA CAVES 2012
- EEA CAVES 2013
- EEA CAVES 2014
- EEA CAVES 2016

== Participants ==
Different roles and responsibilities are assigned to the participants for the mission, according to their background, experience, and interests. Possible roles, in line with the mission programme, include: mission commander, camp site manager, scientist, data engineer, photo engineer and survey engineer. All participants are astronauts–either veteran or rookies–unless otherwise mentioned.

=== CAVES 2011 ===
- Randolph Bresnik – NASA
- Sergey Ryzhikov – Roscosmos
- Norishige Kanai – JAXA
- Tim Peake – ESA
- Thomas Pesquet – ESA

=== CAVES 2012 ===
- Michael Fincke – NASA
- Andrew Feustel – NASA
- Nikolai Tikhonov – Roscosmos
- Soichi Noguchi – JAXA
- David Saint-Jacques – CSA
- Andreas Mogensen – ESA

=== CAVES 2013 ===
- Jeremy Hansen – CSA
- Mike Barratt – NASA
- Jack Fischer – NASA
- Aleksei Ovchinin – Roscosmos
- Satoshi Furukawa – JAXA
- Paolo Nespoli – ESA

=== CAVES 2014 ===
- Scott Tingle – NASA
- Alexander Mirsurkin – Roscosmos
- Sergey Kud-Sverchkov – Roscosmos
- Luca Parmitano – ESA
- Matthias Maurer – ESA (Eurocom at the time, Astronaut since 2015)

=== CAVES 2016 ===
- Jessica Meir – NASA Biologist
- Ricky Arnold – NASA Mission Commander & Campsite Manager
- Sergei Korsakov – Roscosmos Photo Engineer
- Aki Hoshide – JAXA Mission Commander & Campsite Manager
- Ye Guangfu – CNSA Survey Engineer & Data Engineer
- Pedro Duque – ESA Scientist for environmental science, geology and microbiology

=== CAVES 2019 ===
- Joe Acaba – NASA
- Jeanette Epps – NASA
- Joshua Kutryk – CSA
- Alexander Gerst – ESA
- Takuya Onishi – JAXA
- Nikolay Chub – Roscosmos

=== CAVES 2025 ===
- Marco Sieber – ESA
- Jasmin Moghbeli – NASA
- Mohammad AlMulla – MBRSC
- Makoto Suwa – JAXA

=== CAVES 2026 ===
- Rosemary Coogan – ESA
- John McFall – ESA
- Tracy Dyson – NASA
- Ben Bailey – NASA
- Ayu Yoneda – JAXA

== Chinese programme ==
China's astronaut corps (28 astronauts from the 2nd, 3rd and 4th batch) performed a similar cave training in December 2025 and January 2026 in karst caves of Wulong National Park. Astronaut Ye Guangfu, who participated in ESA CAVES in 2016, commanded the operation. Zhai Zhigang is another commander.

== See also ==
- List of European Space Agency programmes and missions
- ESA PANGAEA
- Astronaut training
- Extreme environments
- Neemo
- Space exploration
- Terrestrial space analogues
