= John McFall (athlete) =

British Paralympic sprinter

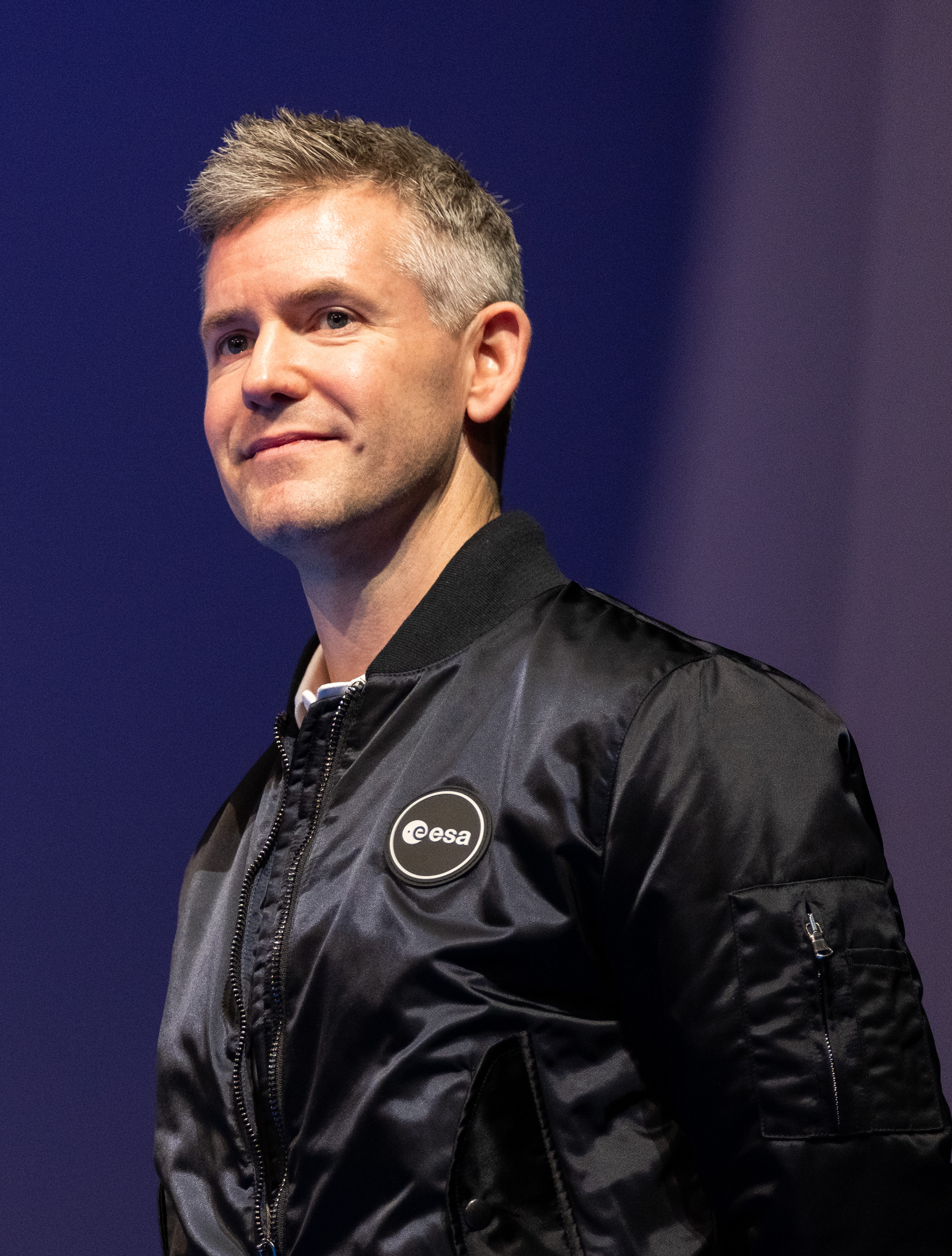
- McFall in 2022

Personal information
- Born: 25 April 1981 (age 45) Frimley, Surrey, England, UK
- Space career

ESA astronaut
- Selection: 2022 ESA Group

Sport
- Country: Wales; Great Britain
- Turned pro: 2005

Achievements and titles
- World finals: 100 m (T42): gold – 2007 IWAS World Wheelchair and Amputee Games; silver – 2007 Visa Paralympic World Cup; silver – 2006 IPC World C'ships; 200 m (T42): gold – 2007 IWAS World Wheelchair and Amputee Games; gold – 2007 Visa Paralympic World Cup; bronze – 2006 IPC World C'ships; bronze – 2005 IPC Open European C'ships
- Highest world ranking: 100 m: 2nd (2007); 200 m: 1st (2007)
- Personal bests: 60 m: 8.55 s (2005) 100 m: 12.70 s (2007) 200 m: 26.02 s (2006)
Medal record
Men's para athletics
Representing Great Britain
Paralympic Games
Bronze medal – third place	2008 Beijing	100m T42

John McFall (born 25 April 1981) is a British Paralympic sprinter, a surgeon, and the first disabled astronaut candidate.

In 2000, when McFall was 19 years old, his right leg was amputated above the knee following a serious motorcycle accident. He took up running again after being fitted with a prosthesis, and participated in his first race in 2004. The following year, he was selected to represent Great Britain at the International Paralympic Committee (IPC) European Championships, and took the bronze medal in the 200 metres (sport class T42). In the 100-metre sprint, McFall subsequently won silver medals at the IPC World Championships in 2006 and the Visa Paralympic World Cup in 2007. On 6 July 2007, he was placed third at the Meeting Gaz de France in Paris, part of the ÅF Golden League; and achieved his personal best time (as at 30 May 2008) in the 100 metres of 12.70 seconds by winning silver at the Bayer International Track and Field Competition in Leverkusen on 10 August of that year. In his other main event, the 200 metres, he achieved a bronze in the 2006 IPC World Championships, and a gold at the 2007 Visa Paralympic World Cup with a competition record time of 26.84 seconds. In September 2007, McFall was champion in both the 100 metres and 200 metres at the International Wheelchair and Amputee Sports Federation (IWAS) World Wheelchair and Amputee Games. He was ranked first in the world in 2007 for the 200 metres, and second for the 100 metres. He competed for Great Britain in the 100 metres (T42) at the 2008 Summer Paralympics in Beijing, winning the bronze in a time of 13.08 seconds.

In 2014, McFall graduated with a Bachelor of Medicine and Surgery from the Cardiff University School of Medicine. In 2016, he became a member of the Royal College of Surgeons. Between 2016 and 2018, he completed Core Surgical Training covering General Surgery, Urology and Trauma and Orthopaedics in the Wessex Deanery of Health Education England. He is currently a Trauma and Orthopaedic Specialist Registrar.[5]

On 23 November 2022, John McFall was selected by the European Space Agency to be the first "parastronaut". (Note: The ESA has previously used the term "parastronaut" but McFall himself has rejected the term.)

== Early years and education ==
John McFall was born on 25 April 1981 in Frimley, Surrey, in England. Between 1994 and 1997, he attended school at Millfield in Street, Somerset, where as a teenager he was a runner and hockey player. In August 2000, while on a gap-year trip to Ko Samui, Thailand, after his A-levels, he was involved in a serious motorcycle accident. While riding a moped, he went round a corner too quickly and skidded. He put out his leg to stop the motorcycle from falling over, and smashed his knee. The motorcycle then fell on him, resulting in the chain severing major blood vessels in his leg.

He was flown to a hospital in Bangkok, but as he had damaged his lower right leg so severely, it had to be amputated above the knee after three days. Upon returning to the UK, he spent about seven weeks undergoing rehabilitation at Queen Mary's Hospital in Roehampton, London.

McFall spent the next year at home, during which he took up mountain biking and climbing and worked as a fitness instructor at his local leisure centre. He also started running in the summer of 2003 as soon as he had his prosthesis fitted: "I love that sound of air rushing past your ears and the freedom of it. I missed that and I wanted to get that back." After taking up his place at Swansea University to pursue a Bachelor of Science (BSc) in sport and exercise science, he practised on the university's running track and also trained with a local running club, the Swansea Harriers Athletic Club. However, he found running difficult and uncomfortable as his prosthesis was not designed for the purpose, and frequently got damaged. Upon making inquiries at the Federation of Disability Sport Wales (FDSW), he was introduced to carbon-fibre running "blades". He graduated from university with an upper second-class honours degree in summer 2004, taking part in his first race at the Disability Sports Events (DSE) Championships in the UK the same year.

In September 2004, McFall embarked on postgraduate studies in sport and exercise science at the University of Wales Institute, Cardiff (UWIC), subsequently graduating with a Master of Science (MSc). He took pre-medical examinations in 2008, and planned to retire from athletics after his 2009 season to train as a doctor.

== Athletics career ==
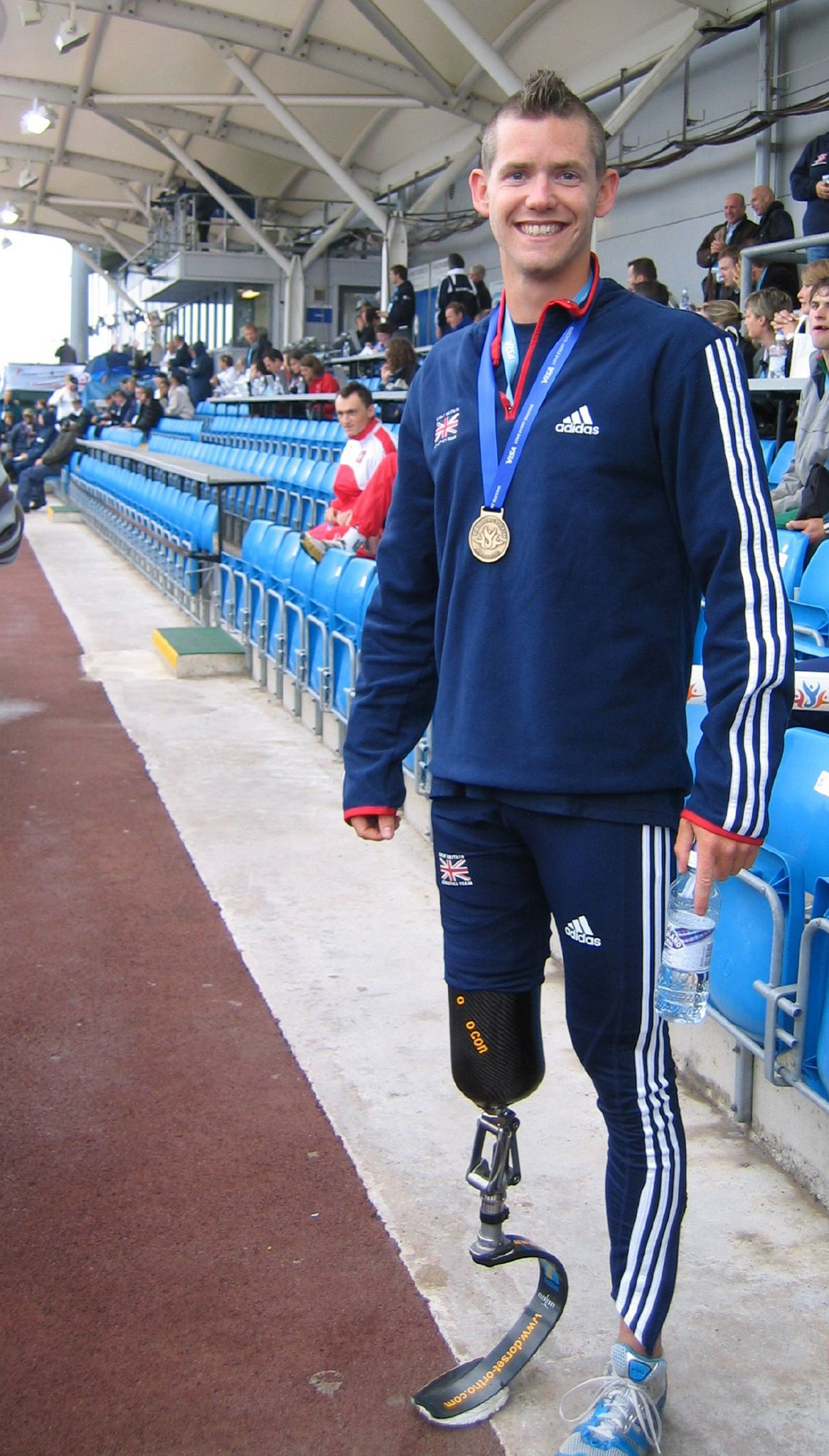
McFall with the gold medal he won for the 200 metres sprint at the Visa Paralympic World Cup in Manchester, England, on 13 May 2007

With his sprinting prosthesis, McFall began training with an ex-Paralympian. In early 2005 former Welsh international athlete Darrell Maynard took over as his coach and he began training with an able-bodied squad. He was selected to represent Great Britain at the International Paralympic Committee (IPC) European Championships which took place in August 2005 in Espoo, Finland, a decision that greatly surprised him as he had not achieved the qualifying standard in races that summer. In the Championships, his first international competition, he took the bronze medal in the 200 metres and came fourth in the 100-metre race, having competed in sport class T42 (single amputation above the knee). McFall was subsequently placed on a funding programme, enabling him to become a full-time athlete.

At the end of January 2006, two weeks before the Sparkassen Cup in Stuttgart, Germany, McFall's car was stolen from the car park of the Welsh Institute of Sport where he worked part-time and trained. His customized running prosthesis worth £3,000 was in the boot. Following his appeal for the return of the prosthesis, he received a telephone call from two youths who said they "might be able to recover the lost leg" but asked "What is it worth?" Infuriated, McFall refused to pay anything and asked the youths whether they had considered what being an amputee was like. After McFall agreed to take no further action against them, the youths anonymously returned the prosthesis to the Institute a week later. McFall went on to achieve a personal best of 8.55 seconds in the 60 metres race, and 28.21 seconds in the 200 metres on 4 February.

McFall's next major races were in September 2006 at the International Paralympic Committee (IPC) World Championships, where he was awarded a silver medal in the 100 metres and a bronze in the 200 metres. The following year, on 13 May 2007, McFall struck gold and achieved a competition record time of 26.84 seconds in the 200 metres in his début at the Visa Paralympic World Cup in Manchester, England; he also garnered a silver in the 100 metres. Subsequently, on 6 July 2007, he was placed third at the Meeting Gaz de France in Paris, part of the ÅF Golden League.

McFall achieved his personal best time (as at 30 May 2008) in the 100 metres of 12.70 seconds by winning silver at the Bayer International Track and Field Competition in Leverkusen, Germany, on 10 August 2007. Later that year he was champion in both the 100 metres and 200 metres at the International Wheelchair and Amputee Sports Federation (IWAS) World Wheelchair and Amputee Games in Chinese Taipei held from 9 to 19 September 2007. In 2007, he was ranked first in the world for the 200 metres, and second for the 100 metres.

McFall, who has been called "one of the fastest men in the world over 100m and 200m in the class of above-the-knee amputees", made his Paralympic début for Great Britain in the 100 metres (T42) at the 2008 Summer Paralympics in Beijing. After a false start, he took the bronze medal in 13.08 seconds behind Canada's Earle Connor (12.32 seconds) and Germany's Heinrich Popow (12.98 seconds). Despite McFall's plans to retire from athletics after his 2009 season to study medicine, he did not rule out competing at the 2012 Summer Paralympics in London. He has said, "It would be nice to do 2012. I'm interested in cycling and rowing, and I won't qualify as a doctor till 2013, so it wouldn't be impossible. We'll see. It's that constant striving for excellence, the hunger to do more."

Although McFall was born in England, he lives in Cardiff and competes professionally for Wales. He has said, "Wales has been very good to me and I want to put something back. So I'm very proud to run for Wales." According to him, his motorcycle accident "has been, in some ways, the best thing that ever happened to me. It's given me a focus, a drive, every day is a new challenge. ... I always had a list of goals and aspirations which didn't change after my accident – they just changed direction. Losing my leg has changed my life, but it hasn't changed who I am."

== Medals ==
Time (s)	Medal	Date	Event
100 m (sport class T42)
12.70 (personal best)	Silver	10 August 2007	Bayer International Track and Field Competition; Leverkusen, Germany
12.79	Bronze	6 July 2007	Meeting Gaz de France, ÅF Golden League; Paris, France
12.83	Gold	13 September 2007	International Wheelchair and Amputee Sports Federation (IWAS) World Wheelchair and Amputee Games; Chinese Taipei
12.98	Gold	20 May 2006	ParalympicChallenge; Duderstadt, Lower Saxony, Germany
13.02	Silver	13 May 2007	2007 Visa Paralympic World Cup; Manchester, England, UK
13.08	Bronze	14 September 2008	2008 Summer Paralympics; Beijing, People's Republic of China
13.55	Silver	9 September 2006	International Paralympic Committee (IPC) World Championships; Assen, Netherlands
200 m (sport class T42)
26.02 (personal best)	Unknown	11 June 2006	[Not yet ascertained] Manchester, England
26.08	Gold	17 June 2007	World Athletics Championships for the Disabled; Stadskanaal, Netherlands
26.20	Gold	14 September 2007	IWAS World Wheelchair and Amputee Games; Chinese Taipei
26.40	Bronze	5 September 2006	IPC World Championships; Assen, Netherlands
26.84 (competition record)	Gold	13 May 2007	2007 Visa Paralympic World Cup; Manchester, England, UK
27.04	Bronze	14 August 2005	[Not yet ascertained] Berlin, Germany
28.08	Bronze	26 August 2005	IPC Open European Championships; Espoo, Finland

== 2022 ESA Astronaut Group ==
On 23 November 2022, McFall was announced to be one of the reserve and subsequently, project astronauts in the 2022 European Space Agency Astronaut Group. The ESA carried out a feasibility study on him flying to space and what needed to be adapted for disabled people. In February 2025 it was concluded that there were no technical or medical reasons why he could not be part of a mission lasting up to six months. The ESA had used the term "parastronaut" to describe an astronaut with disabilities, but McFall has rejected the term.

In June 2026, McFall participated in the ESA CAVES 2026 course held in the Matese mountains in the Italian Apennines with his astronaut colleagues Rosemary Coogan (ESA), Tracy Caldwell Dyson (NASA), Ayu Yoneda (JAXA), and NASA astronaut candidate Ben Bailey.

== Personal life ==
Following the 2008 Paralympic Games, McFall returned to the UK from Beijing overland via the Trans-Siberian Railway. He travelled from China to Mongolia and Russia, across Russia to Ukraine, then to Hungary, Croatia and the Dalmatian coast. From there he took a ferry to Italy to meet his girlfriend in Rome. They then travelled by train across Italy and Austria, eventually returning to the UK around the middle of November 2008. McFall hopes one day to take up his childhood plans of running across the Sahara Desert, crossing the Atlantic Ocean by rowing boat, and obtaining a free-fall parachute licence.

In his free time, McFall enjoys playing the guitar.
