= SpaceX Crew-14 =

2027 American crewed spaceflight to the ISS

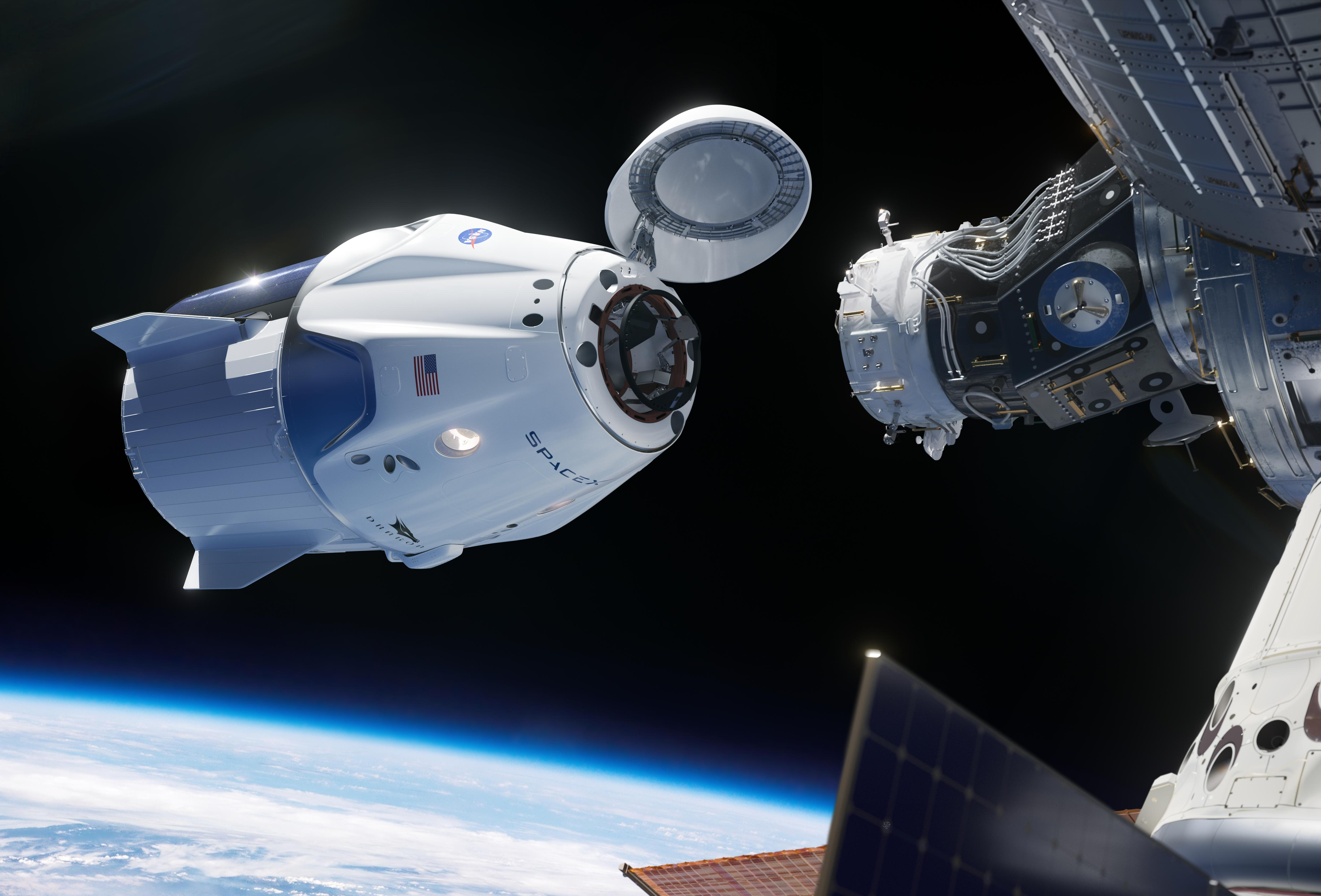
- Artist's representation of Crew Dragon in orbit
- Names: USCV-14
- Mission type: ISS crew transport
- Operator: SpaceX

Spacecraft properties
- Spacecraft: Crew Dragon
- Spacecraft type: Crew Dragon
- Manufacturer: SpaceX

Crew
- Crew size: 4
- Members: Kayla Barron; Christina Birch; Makoto Suwa; Harutyun Kiviryan
- Expedition: Expedition 75/76

Start of mission
- Launch date: NET 1 March 2027
- Rocket: Falcon 9 Block 5
- Launch site: Cape Canaveral, SLC‑40

End of mission
- Landing date: NET October 2027
- Landing site: Pacific Ocean (planned)

Orbital parameters
- Reference system: Geocentric orbit
- Regime: Low Earth orbit
- Inclination: 51.63°

Docking with ISS
- Docking port: Harmony zenith
- Docking date: March 2027
- Undocking date: October 2027
- From left to right: Kiviryan, Birch, Barron, and Suwa Commercial Crew Program Crew Dragon flights

SpaceX Crew-14 is the fourteenth operational NASA Commercial Crew Program flight and the 22nd crewed orbital flight of a Crew Dragon spacecraft. The mission will transport four crew members—NASA astronauts Kayla Barron and Christina Birch, JAXA astronaut Makoto Suwa, and Roscosmos cosmonaut Harutyun Kiviryan—to the International Space Station (ISS).

== Crew ==
NASA's Kayla Barron was announced as the mission commander. This will be her second spaceflight.

Prime crew
Position	Crew
Commander	Kayla Barron, NASA; Expedition 75/76; Second spaceflight
Pilot	Christina Birch, NASA; Expedition 75/76; First spaceflight
Mission specialist	Makoto Suwa, JAXA; Expedition 75/76; First spaceflight
Mission specialist	Harutyun Kiviryan, Roscosmos; Expedition 75/76; First spaceflight

Backup crew
Position	Crew
Mission specialist	Alexander Kolyabin, Roscosmos

The pilot, Christina Birch, was selected as a NASA astronaut in 2021 and holds a doctorate in biological engineering from the Massachusetts Institute of Technology. This will be her first flight. This will be the first mission for Makoto Suwa, a Princeton University educated PhD in geoscience who worked for the United Nations World Meteorological Organization before being selected as a JAXA astronaut in 2023. Lastly, Roscosmos' Harutyun Kiviryan is also a rookie who has a background as a military rocket engineer before being selected as a cosmonaut in 2021.
