= List of Artemis astronauts =

Astronauts from NASA's Artemis program

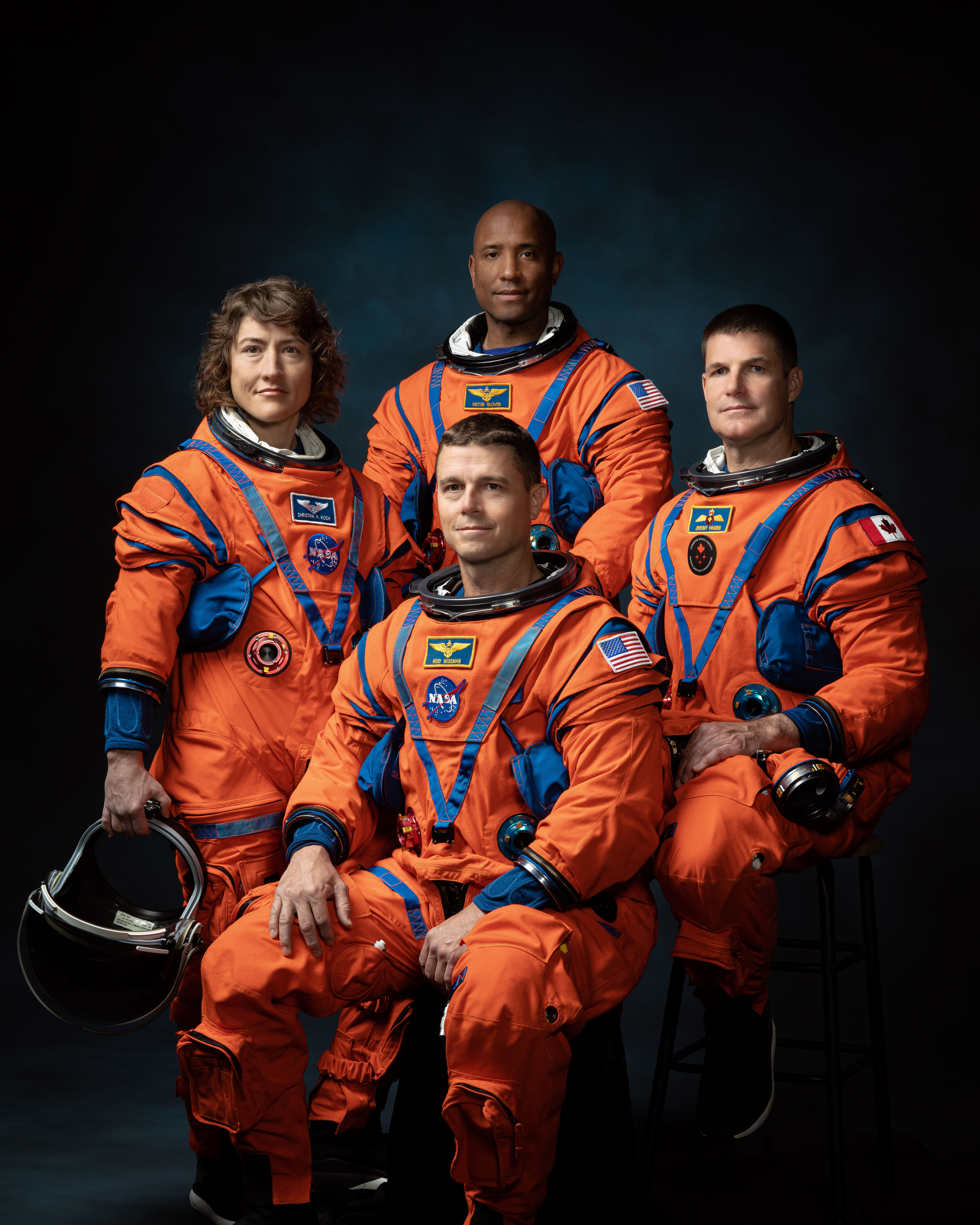
The crew of Artemis II in 2026 were the first to fly around the Moon since Apollo 17 in 1972. Clockwise from left: Christina Koch, Victor Glover, Jeremy Hansen and Reid Wiseman

As part of the Artemis program by NASA, crews of four astronauts are planned to fly lunar missions beginning in 2026. The Artemis II flyby of the Moon included the first four astronauts to fly beyond Earth orbit since the Apollo program, becoming the 25th through 28th humans to do so. The Artemis II crew included the first woman (Christina Koch), person of color (Victor Glover), first non-United States citizen (Jeremy Hansen of the Canadian Space Agency), and oldest person (Reid Wiseman, followed by Hansen and Glover as the second and third oldest) to reach deep space and the Moon's vicinity. At a distance of 252,756 mi (406,771 km) beyond the Earth, Artemis II is currently the furthest crewed spaceflight.

The Artemis III crew, who plan to fly in low Earth orbit in 2027, were revealed on 9 June 2026: Randy Bresnik, Frank Rubio, and Andre Douglas of NASA, and Luca Parmitano of the European Space Agency. Artemis IV is planned to land a two-person crew on the Moon in early 2028, becoming the first moonwalkers since the Apollo era and the 13th and 14th overall. As of June 2026, the crew for Artemis IV (and all subsequent missions) is unannounced.

== Full list ==
In December 2020, NASA announced the selection of 18 astronauts as part of an "Artemis Team" that would be considered for future Artemis missions to the Moon. (Note: The initial 18 astronauts selected were the following: Joe Acaba, Kayla Barron, Raja Chari, Matthew Dominick, Victor Glover, Woody Hoburg, Jonny Kim, Christina Koch, Kjell Lindgren, Nicole Aunapu Mann, Anne McClain, Jessica Meir, Jasmin Moghbeli, Kathleen Rubins, Frank Rubio, Scott Tingle, Jessica Watkins, and Stephanie Wilson. As of June 2026, only Glover, Koch, and Rubio had been selected to fly on specific Artemis missions.) By August 2022, Wiseman revealed that all active members of the NASA Astronaut Corps are eligible for Artemis flights. (Note: As of October 2026, the number of active astronauts at the NASA Astronaut Corps is 31, consisting of 17 men and 14 women.) Majority of the Artemis astronauts (excluding Gibson, Hansen, and Douglas) had previous spaceflight experience as part of long-duration expeditions aboard the International Space Station.

== Artemis astronauts by their dates of selection ==
=== 2004 ===
This group, nicknamed "The Peacocks", were the last astronaut group to fly aboard a Space Shuttle. Only one out of 11 astronauts from this group have been assigned into Artemis missions: (Note: Randy Bresnik is the only active astronaut of NASA Group 19 when he was selected as the commander of Artemis III in 9 June 2026.)

- Randolph "Randy" Bresnik – Commander of Artemis III.

=== 2009 ===
A total of 14 astronauts (including five from other countries) comprise "The Chumps", the first astronaut group selected for the post-Shuttle era. Only two of them so far have been assigned in Artemis flights, including the first non-American to fly around the Moon:

- Jeremy Hansen – Mission specialist on Artemis II.
- Gregory "Reid" Wiseman – Commander of Artemis II.

Additionally, the first European assigned to an Artemis flight was also selected separately by ESA on this year:

- Luca Parmitano – Pilot of Artemis III.

=== 2013 ===
This group, nicknamed "The 8 Balls", comprised the highest percentage of female finalists selected as astronauts. Of the 8 astronauts from this group, 2 have been selected for Artemis flights, including the first woman and first person of color to fly around the Moon:

- Victor Glover – Pilot of Artemis II.
- Christina Koch – Mission specialist on Artemis II.

=== 2017 ===
"The Turtles" make up a total of 12 astronauts that were selected by NASA in June 2017, including two from the Canadian Space Agency. As of June 2026, three astronauts from this group are assigned onto Artemis flights, either prime or backup crews:

- Jenni Gibbons – Backup mission specialist for Artemis II.
- Robert "Bob" Hines – Backup crew member for Artemis III.
- Francisco "Frank" Rubio – Mission specialist on Artemis III.

=== 2021 ===
A total of 12 astronauts (including two from the United Arab Emirates) were selected in December 2021. Nicknamed "The Flies", so far only one has been assigned to Artemis flights:

- Andre Douglas – Backup crew member for Artemis II, later mission specialist on Artemis III.

== Artemis astronauts who flew around the Moon ==
	Portrait	Name and group	Born	Died	Age at launch	Mission	Astronaut service	Notes
1		Reid Wiseman (NASA Astronaut Group 20)	November 11, 1975 (age 50)		50	Artemis II; April 1–11, 2026	US Navy	NASA Chief of the Astronaut Office (2020–2022). Previously flew as flight engineer on Soyuz TMA-13M as part of ISS Expedition 40/41.
2		Victor Glover (NASA Astronaut Group 21)	April 30, 1976 (age 50)		49	Artemis II; April 1–11, 2026	US Navy	First person of color to travel around the Moon. Previously flew to the ISS on SpaceX Crew-1, the first operational mission of the Commercial Crew Program, as part of Expedition 64/65.
3		Christina Koch (NASA Astronaut Group 21)	January 29, 1979 (age 47)		47	Artemis II; April 1–11, 2026	NASA	First female astronaut to fly around the Moon. Also the record holder for the longest single spaceflight by a woman (328 days) during ISS Expedition 59/60/61.
4		Jeremy Hansen (NASA Astronaut Group 20)	January 27, 1976 (age 50)		50	Artemis II; April 1–11, 2026	Canadian Air Force	First non-American astronaut to fly around the Moon.

== Artemis astronauts who plan to fly into low Earth orbit ==
	Portrait	Name and group	Born	Died	Age at launch	Mission	Astronaut service	Notes
1		Randy Bresnik (NASA Astronaut Group 19)	September 11, 1967 (age 59)			Artemis III; NET June 2027	US Marines	Previously a flight engineer and later commander for ISS Expedition 52/53. Only Artemis astronaut to fly on a Space Shuttle (STS-129).
2		Luca Parmitano (2009 ESA Group)	September 27, 1976 (age 50)			Artemis III; NET June 2027	Italian Air Force	Previously a flight engineer for ISS Expedition 36/37 and 60, later commander on ISS Expedition 61.
3		Frank Rubio (NASA Astronaut Group 22)	December 11, 1975 (age 50)			Artemis III; NET June 2027	US Army	Record holder of the longest spaceflight for an American astronaut (371 days) during ISS Expedition 67/68/69.
4		Andre Douglas (NASA Astronaut Group 23)	December 11, 1985 (age 40)			Artemis III; NET June 2027	US Coast Guard	Previously a backup crew member for Artemis II.

== Artemis astronauts yet to fly but assigned as backup crew ==
	Portrait	Name and group	Born	Died	Mission	Astronaut service	Notes
1		Jenni Gibbons (NASA Astronaut Group 22)	August 3, 1988 (age 38)		Artemis II	Canadian Space Agency	Backup crew member for Artemis II alongside Andre Douglas.
2		Bob Hines (NASA Astronaut Group 22)	January 11, 1975 (age 51)		Artemis III	US Air Force	Backup crew member for Artemis III. Previously flew to the ISS on SpaceX Crew-4 as part of Expedition 67/68.

== Astronauts who were selected/trained for Artemis but did not fly ==
- Joseph M. Acaba – veteran of STS-119 and two ISS expeditions (Soyuz TMA-04M – Expedition 31/32 and Soyuz MS-06 – Expedition 53/54). Selected for training as part of the initial Artemis team in December 2020, but then became the Chief of the Astronaut Office from 2023 to 2025, replacing Wiseman. Currently serving as an advisor for mission planning and strategy.
- Jonny Kim – veteran of one ISS expedition (Soyuz MS-27 – Expedition 72/73). Selected for training as part of the initial Artemis team in December 2020, but eventually retired from NASA in August 2026.
- Kjell Lindgren – veteran of two ISS expeditions (Soyuz TMA-17M – Expedition 44/45 and SpaceX Crew-4 – Expedition 67/68). Selected for training as part of the initial Artemis team in December 2020. Currently serving as the Deputy Director of the Flight Operations Directorate.
- Kathleen Rubins – veteran of two ISS expeditions (Soyuz MS-01 – Expedition 48/49 and Soyuz MS-17 – Expedition 63/64). Selected for training as part of the initial Artemis team in December 2020, but eventually retired from NASA in July 2025.
- Scott D. Tingle – veteran of one ISS expedition (Soyuz MS-07 – Expedition 54/55). Selected for training as part of the initial Artemis team in December 2020. Currently serving as the Chief of the Astronaut Office since November 2025, replacing Acaba.

== See also ==
- List of Apollo astronauts
