= Dividend future =

Financial derivative contract

In finance, a dividend future is an exchange-traded derivative contract that allows investors to take positions on future dividend payments. Dividend futures can be on a single company, a basket of companies, or on an Equity index. They settle on the amount of dividend paid by the company, the basket of companies, or the index during the period of the contract.

For example, if company A pays a quarterly dividend of $0.25 in 2012. If an investor buys a 2012 dividend future, the settlement price of the future will be equal to 4 x $0.25 = $1 per contract. The profit or loss the investor makes depends on the difference between the price they bought or sold the future and the settlement price. For instance, if the investor bought the 2012 dividend future at $0.90, he would make a profit of $0.10 per contract. Most dividend futures trades occur before the dividend is known, hence allowing investors to go "long" or "short" the future dividend payment. The "buyer" of the contract, is said to be "long", and the "seller" of the contract, is said to be "short". The terminology reflects the expectations of the parties: the buyer thinks the dividend is going to increase, while the seller thinks it will decrease. The contract itself costs nothing to enter; the buy/sell terminology is a linguistic convenience reflecting the position each party is taking (long or short).

Dividend futures are usually traded in increments/lots/batches of 100 or 1000 and have a 1-year time span. When purchased, no transmission of share rights or dividends occurs. Being futures contracts, they are traded on margin, thus offering leverage, and are not subject to the taxes equity holders must pay when they receive dividend distribution on their stocks. They are traded in various financial markets, mainly in Europe, and Asia, and several Blue chip companies and Equity Indices are available with maturities going as long as 5 years for Equities and 10 years for Equity indices.

== History ==
In 1999 Professor Michael J. Brennan of the University of California at Los Angeles proposed the creation of dividend strips for the S&P 500. He argued that these would "enhance the ability of markets to aggregate and transmit information" and that "since the level of the market index must be consistent with the prices of the future dividend flows, the relation between these will serve to reveal the implicit assumptions that the market is making in arriving at its valuation. These assumptions will then be the focus of analysis and debate."

Before dividend futures existed, an investor who wanted a similar exposure did so by trading a dividend swap. Dividend swaps are the over-the-counter version of dividend futures. They allow two parties to agree to swap in the future a pre-defined amount of cash against the amount of dividends paid by the underlying stock, basket or equity index. Created in the early 2000s, dividend Swaps became very popular because they allowed equity holders to "sell" their future dividends in advance and hence hedge their future dividend stream. The biggest players were investment banks looking to cover their future dividend exposure from derivatives positions they had on their books. The first dividend future was listed in June 2008 by the derivatives exchange Eurex, a derivatives exchange, on the Euro Stoxx 50 dividends, and since then many new dividend futures were created on various exchanges.

The exchange listing made these products available to wider range of investors who could not trade over-the-counter (OTC).

There are currently dividend futures listed on Eurex, NYSE Euronext, MEFF, Borsa Italiana IDEM, London Stock Exchange, Tokyo Stock Exchange, Hong Kong Exchanges and Clearing Limited, CME Group and the Singapore Exchange.

== Uses ==
Dividend futures can be used by investors for investment, hedging or arbitrage.

=== Investment ===
Dividend futures allow investors to take a position on the future dividends paid by single names or indices such as the Euro Stoxx 50. An investor might believe that a company's future dividend payment expectations are too high or too low and can decide to take a position in dividend futures to express his views. By investing in a single stock dividend future, an investor has a proxy of a company's earnings. dividends paid by a company usually varying in line with its earnings, the investor can take a pure fundamental view by choosing which dividend, hence which earnings forecast, he wants to pinpoint. Because dividend future are finite, at one stage, the performance of the future will be driven only by the company's paid dividends rather than micro or macro economic news flow. By investing in an Index dividend future, investors have a similar exposure, except they're taking a view on a basket of companies. This is usually done to implement a macro view on future dividends in a country or a continent.

=== Hedging ===
Most equity derivatives instruments, like options, are sensitive to future evolution of dividends. In the past, the dividend future market players were pure derivatives players because they were the most sensitive to dividend outcomes. They use these futures, and before them dividend Swaps, to hedge their dividend exposure. dividend futures are also seen as an inflation hedge. Studies show that dividend and inflation growth are correlated, hence the use of long term dividend futures, like on indices, to hedge an investor's exposure to inflation.

=== Arbitrage ===
Like on any asset class, investors can take a relative value position on a market compared to another. In dividend futures, the arbitrage opportunities can be taken against its underlying stock or CDS. Going long a dividend future, for example, and short the underlying stock results in taking a position on a company's dividend yield. Another type of arbitrage, that is common with equities, is called Index Arbitrage. In dividend futures, Index Arbitrage consists of taking spread positions between an Index dividend futures and its components.

== Market Players ==
Historical players in this market were banks who offset the dividend risks from their structured products to their clients, mainly hedge funds, through dividend Swaps. Year 2008 saw the arrival of the first dividend futures and the collapse of the financial industry, hence market participants in dividend Swaps switched their position to dividend futures to eliminate counterparty risks. The listing also brought new players, who were not active in the Over-The-Counter market, such as asset managers, pension funds and family offices. The market not being anymore reserved to some few specialists, volumes picked up and number of participants grew.

== A new asset class ==
From a hedging instrument, dividend futures have the potential of developing as an asset class on their own. From an investor perspective, dividend futures give exposure to a specific cash flow stream from a company. Unlike equities, where an investor is exposed to continuing dividend stream, dividend futures allow investors to choose the year they want to get exposed on.

From a risk profile perspective, dividends are unique. When a company's profit improve, dividends usually rise; when they fall dividends are cut. However, dividends are somewhat resilient because companies tend to smooth the variations of their dividend payments. For these reasons, research have highlighted that dividends are in between stocks and bonds in terms of risk-reward.
