= Randolph Bresnik =

United States Marine and astronaut (born 1967)

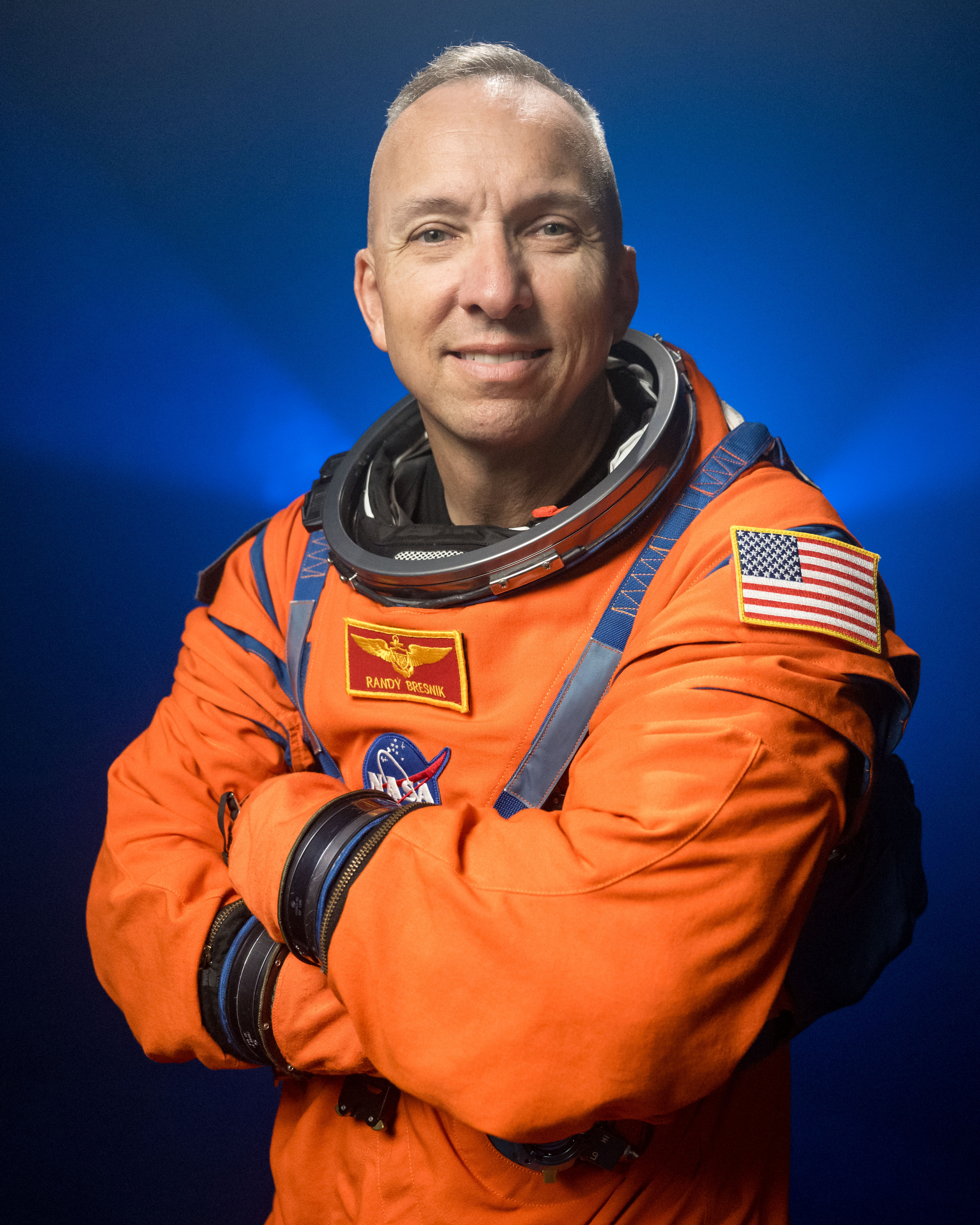
- Bresnik in 2026
- Born: Randolph James Bresnik; September 11, 1967 (age 59); Fort Knox, Kentucky, U.S.
- Education: The Citadel (BA); University of Tennessee, Knoxville (MS)
- Call sign: Komrade
- Space career

NASA astronaut
- Rank: Colonel, United States Marine Corps (ret.)
- Time in space: 149 days, 12 hours, 12 minutes
- Selection: NASA Group 19 (2004)
- Total EVAs: 5
- Total EVA time: 32 hours
- Mission: STS-129; Soyuz MS-05 (Expedition 52/53)
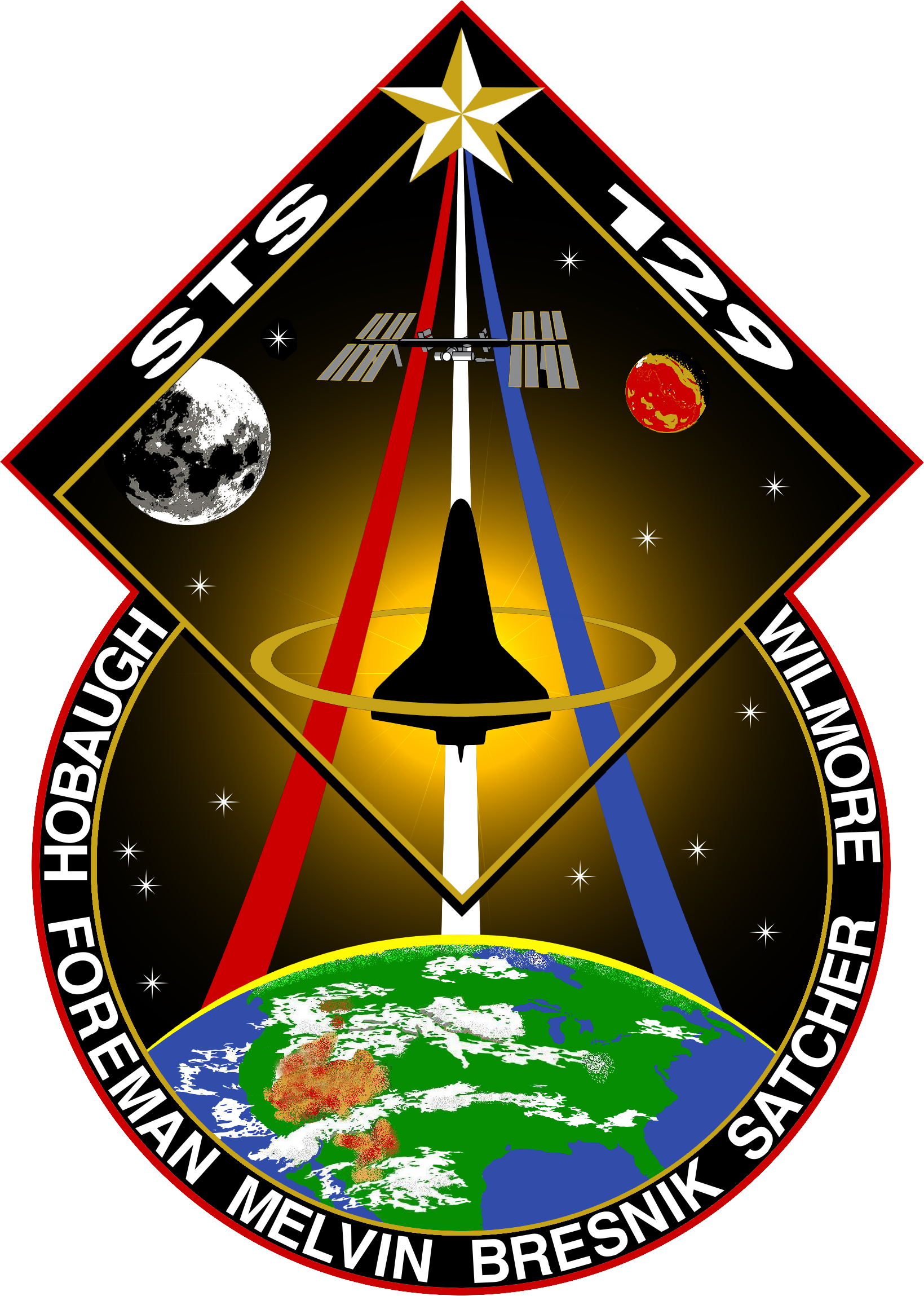
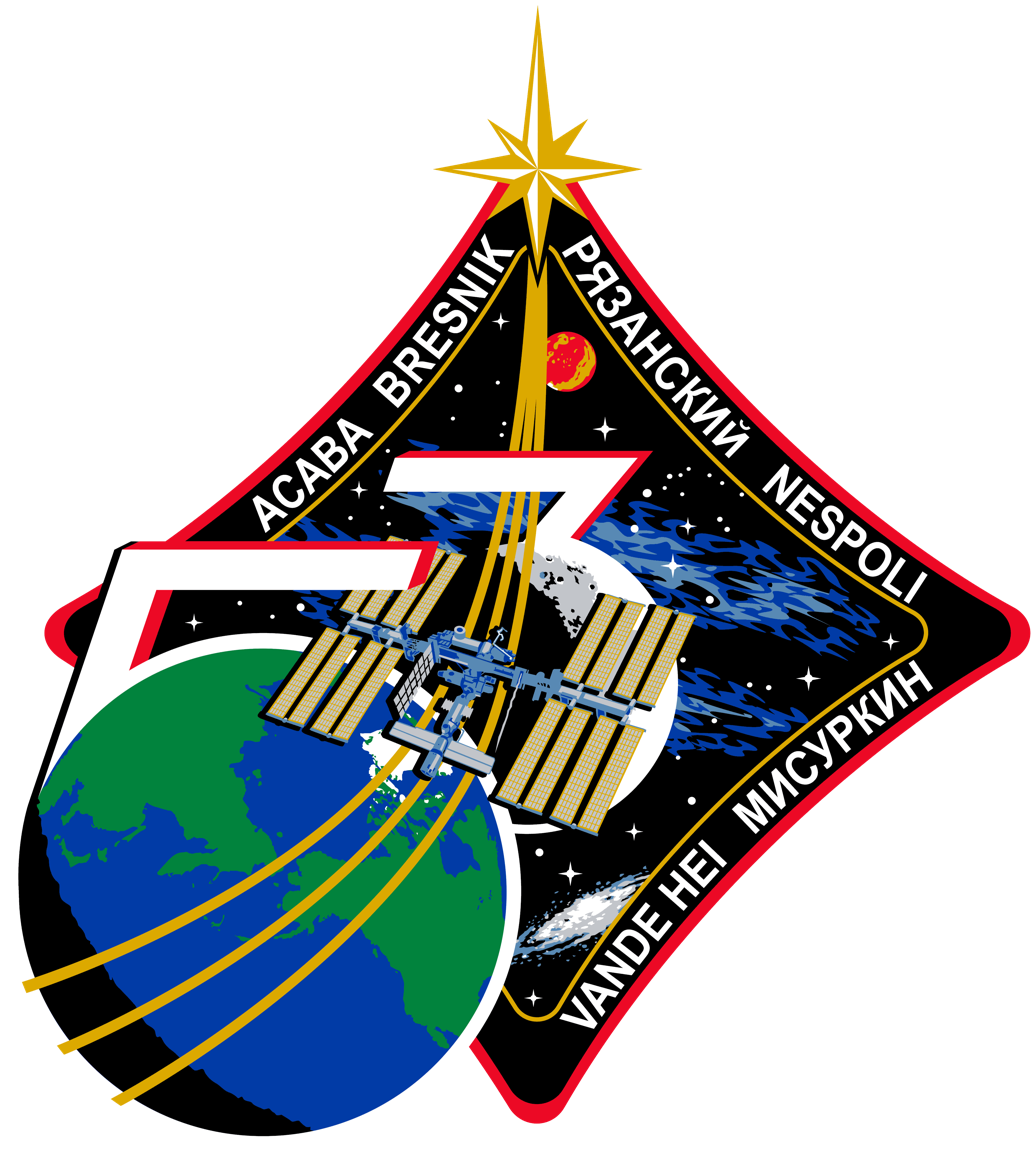
- Mission insignia

Randolph "Randy" James Bresnik (born September 11, 1967) is an American retired officer in the United States Marine Corps and an active NASA astronaut. A Marine aviator by trade, Bresnik was selected as a member of NASA Astronaut Group 19 in May 2004. He first launched to space on STS-129, then served as flight engineer for Expedition 52, and as ISS commander for Expedition 53. In June 2026, he was announced as the commander of Artemis III as part of NASA's Artemis program.

== Biography ==
Bresnik was born in Fort Knox, Kentucky, but considers Santa Monica, California, to be his hometown. He has Slovene ancestry.

Bresnik graduated from Santa Monica High School in 1985. He then earned a Bachelor of Arts degree in mathematics from The Citadel in 1989, and later a Master of Science degree in Aviation Systems from the University of Tennessee-Knoxville in 2002. He then graduated from the Air War College in 2008. Randy is the first graduate of The Citadel to fly in space.

Bresnik's family includes his wife, Rebecca Burgin of Pompton Plains, New Jersey, a son, and a daughter who was born while he was in orbit during STS-129. This marked the second time a space traveler became a parent while on orbit; it first happened when Franz Viehböck's daughter was born while he was in space in 1991. Bresnik's wife Rebecca has worked at NASA as acting associate general counsel of its International, Space and National Security Law Group. His father is Albert "Randy" Bresnik, a pilot himself, serving in the Vietnam War and later in domestic duties. His grandfather, Albert Louis "Al" Bresnik, was Amelia Earhart's photographer.

== Marine Corps ==
In May 1989, Bresnik received his commission as a second lieutenant in the U.S. Marine Corps from the Naval Reserve Officer Training Corps at The Citadel. After graduation he attended The Basic School (TBS) and Infantry Officers Course (IOC) at Marine Corps Base Quantico, Virginia. Following Aviation Indoctrination and Primary flight training in Pensacola, Florida, he entered Intermediate and Advanced flight training in Beeville, Texas, and was designated a Naval Aviator in 1992.

Bresnik then reported to the Navy Fighter/Attack Training Squadron VFA-106, Naval Air Station Cecil Field, Florida, for initial F/A-18 training. Upon completion of training, he reported to Marine Fighter/Attack Squadron, VMFA-212 at Marine Corps Air Station Kaneohe Bay, Hawaii, then MCAS El Toro, California, and additionally MCAS Miramar, California, where he made three overseas deployments to the Western Pacific. While assigned to VMFA-212, he attended the Marine Corps Weapons and Tactics Instructors Course (WTI) and Naval Fighter Weapons School (TOPGUN).

Bresnik was selected for the U.S. Naval Test Pilot School (USNTPS) at NAS Patuxent River, Maryland, and began the course January 1999. After graduation in December 1999, he was assigned as an F/A-18 Test Pilot/Project Officer at VX-23, the Naval Strike Aircraft Test Squadron (NSATS). While at Strike, Bresnik flew the F/A-18 A-D and F/A-18 E/F in all manners of flight test.

In January 2001, he returned to the USNTPS as a Fixed-Wing and Systems Flight Instructor, where he instructed in the F/A-18, T-38 Talon, and T-2 Buckeye. Bresnik returned to NSATS in January 2002 to continue flight test on the F/A-18 A-F as the Platform/Project Coordinator.

In November 2002, he reported to Marine Aircraft Group 11 (MAG-11) as the Future Operations Officer. In January 2003, MAG-11 deployed to Ahmad al-Jaber Air Base, Kuwait. From Al Jaber, he flew combat missions in the F/A-18 with VMFA(AW)-225 in support of Operation Southern Watch and Operation Iraqi Freedom. Bresnik was the Operations Officer of VMFA-232 when he was selected for the astronaut program.

Bresnik has logged more than 6,000 hours on 81 different aircraft.

During his military service, he was awarded the Defense Meritorious Service Medal, Meritorious Service Medal, Strike/Flight Air Medal (3), Navy and Marine Corps Commendation Medal with Combat "V" (3), Navy and Marine Corps Achievement Medal (3), Presidential Unit Citation, and various other service awards.

== NASA career ==
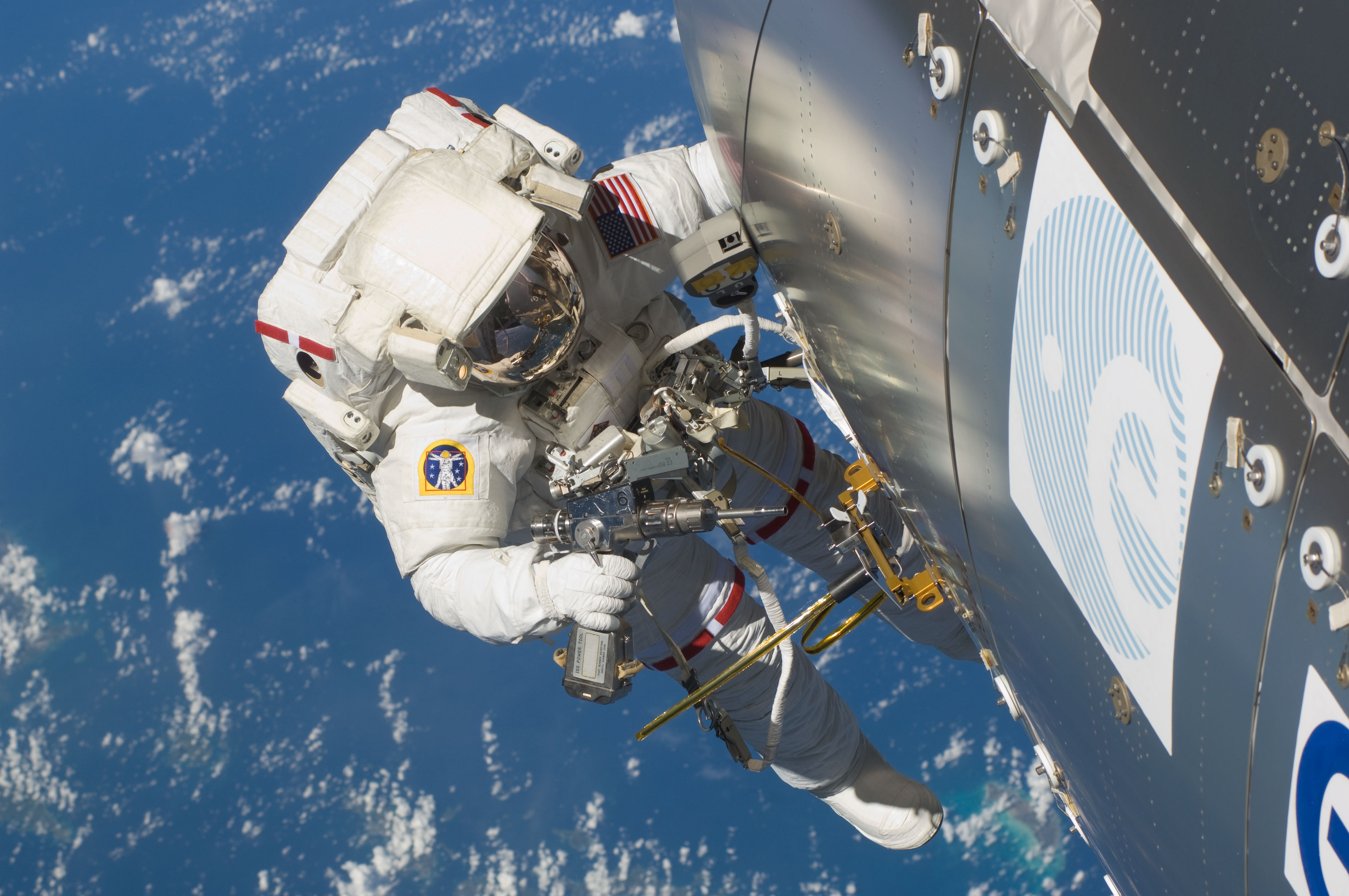
STS 129: Bresnik participates in the mission's second session of extravehicular activity

Bresnik was selected by NASA in May 2004 as an astronaut candidate. He was one of two pilots chosen in the Astronaut Class of 2004. In February 2006, he completed Astronaut Candidate Training. Bresnik participated in the first analogue ESA CAVES mission in September 2011, staying underground and exploring the caves for 6 days, simulating Mars mission technologies.

On June 10, 2014, NASA announced that Bresnik would command the NEEMO 19 undersea exploration mission aboard the Aquarius underwater laboratory, which began on September 7, 2014, and lasted seven days. Bresnik was the lead astronaut assigned to the closeout crew for the final STS-135 launch in the Shuttle program.

=== STS-129 ===
In September 2008, NASA announced that Bresnik was assigned as a mission specialist on STS-129, a shuttle mission to the International Space Station. The mission was then slated to launch in October 2009 aboard Space Shuttle Discovery, although this was later pushed back to November 2009 aboard Space Shuttle Atlantis.

Bresnik and his five crew mates launched from the Kennedy Space Center on November 16, 2009, ahead of an approximately two day rendezvous with the ISS, following which the crew joined the Expedition 21 crew, commanded by Belgian ESA astronaut Frank De Winne. The main objective of STS-129 was to deliver and install the first two of four ExPRESS Logistics Carriers (ELCs) to the ISS. ELCs are exposed pellets installed on the outboard truss of the ISS intended to support vacuum capable payloads such as scientific experiments built for operations on the outside of the station or for holding spare parts.

Bresnik participated in the second and third EVA of STS-129. On November 21, 2009, Bresnik stepped outside the station with veteran spacewalk Michael Foreman, the two spent six hours and eight minutes outside of the ISS installing a piece of equipment called the Grappling Adapter to On-Orbit Railing (GATOR) on the European Columbus, installing a wireless video system on the outside of the station and setting up a cargo attachment system. Bresnik's second spacewalk took place on November 23, 2009, and was alongside NASA astronaut Robert Satcher. Satcher and Bresnik spent five hours and 42-minutes outside the station installing a similar cargo attachment system to the one on the last spacewalk, but on the opposite side of the station, installing the MISSE-7 experiment and transferring a high pressure gas tank.

STS-129 returned to Earth on November 27, 2009, returning Bresnik and his five crew mates, as well as Expedition 21 flight engineer Nicole Stott from the ISS.

=== Expedition 52/53 ===
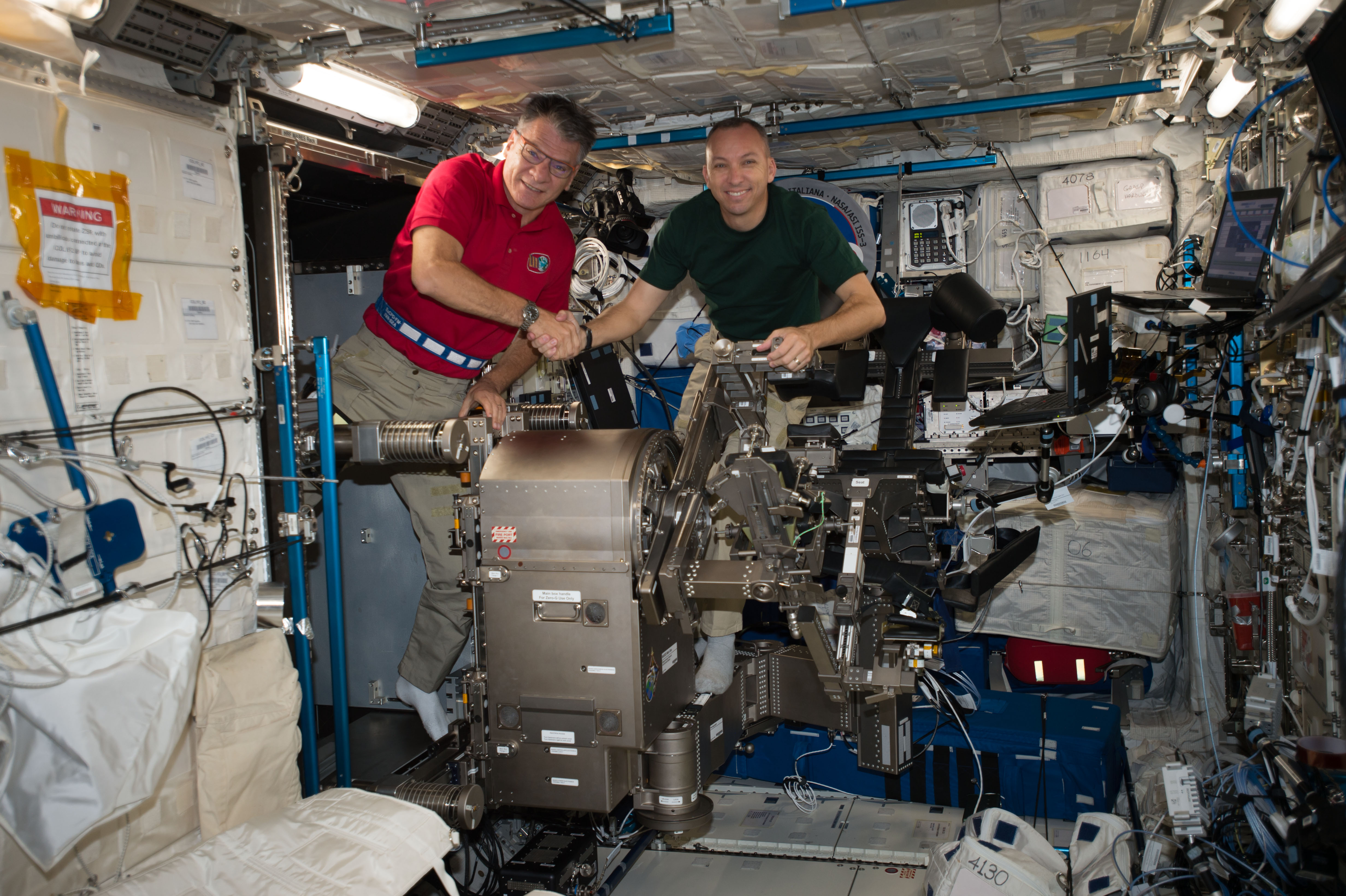
Bresnik (right) pictured with Paolo Nespoli in the Columbus module

Bresnik launched aboard Soyuz MS-05 to the ISS on July 28, 2017, and served as flight engineer for Expedition 52, and as ISS commander for Expedition 53.

On October 5, 2017, Bresnik performed his third spacewalk, along with Mark Vande Hei. The spacewalk replaced the gripping mechanism on Canadarm2, the latching end effector A, or LEE-A. Spacewalk duration was 6 hours and 55 minutes. On October 10, 2017, Bresnik and Vande Hei completed the second EVA of the mission. They lubricated the newly installed end effector and replaced cameras, and the duration was 6 hours and 26 minutes. On October 20, 2017, Bresnik and Joe Acaba performed an EVA to continue with the lubrication tasks, and to install more cameras. The duration was 6 hours and 49 minutes.

Bresnik returned to Earth on December 14, 2017. The Soyuz MS-05 landed on 8:38 UTC. The duration of the mission was 138 days, 16 hours, 56 minutes and 37 seconds.

=== Artemis III ===
On June 9, 2026, NASA announced the crew of four flying on the Artemis III mission to low Earth orbit. Bresnik was chosen as the commander for this mission, alongside pilot Luca Parmitano and mission specialists Frank Rubio and Andre Douglas.

Preceded by Fyodor Yurchikhin	ISS Commander (Expedition 52); 2 September to 14 December 2017	Succeeded by Alexander Misurkin
