= Dividend swap =

Financial derivative

A dividend swap is an over-the-counter financial derivative contract (in particular a form of swap). It consists of a series of payments made between two parties at defined intervals over a fixed term (e.g., annually over 5 years). One party - the holder of the fixed leg - will pay its counterparty a pre-designated fixed payment at each interval. The other party - the holder of the floating leg - will pay its counterparty the total dividends that were paid out by a selected underlying, which can be a single company, a basket of companies, or all the members of an index. The payments are multiplied by a notional number of shares.

Like most swaps, the contract is usually arranged such that its value at signing is zero. This is accomplished by making the value of the fixed leg equal to the value of the floating leg - in other words, the fixed leg will be equal to the average expected dividends over the term of the swap. Therefore, the fixed leg of the swap can be used to estimate market forecasts of the dividends that will be paid out by the underlying.
