= Francisco Rubio (astronaut) =

US astronaut (born 1975)

Frank Rubio
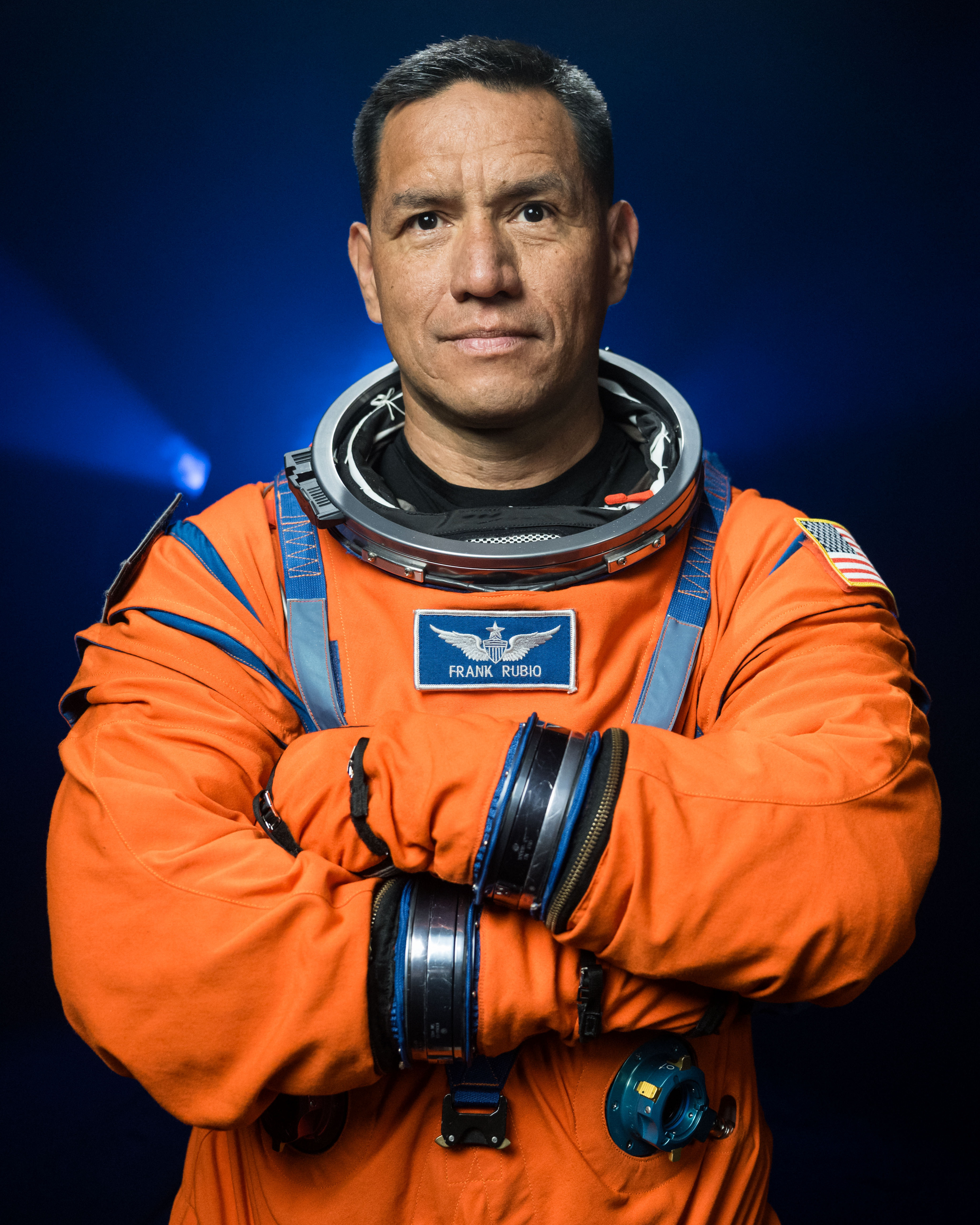
- Rubio in 2026
- Born: Francisco Carlos Rubio; December 11, 1975 (age 50); Los Angeles, California, U.S.
- Education: United States Military Academy (BS); Uniformed Services University of the Health Sciences (MD)
- Space career

NASA astronaut
- Rank: Colonel, United States Army
- Time in space: 370 days, 21 hours, 23 minutes
- Selection: NASA Group 22 (2017)
- Total EVAs: 3
- Total EVA time: 21 hours, 24 minutes
- Missions: Soyuz MS-22/MS-23 (Expedition 67/68/69)
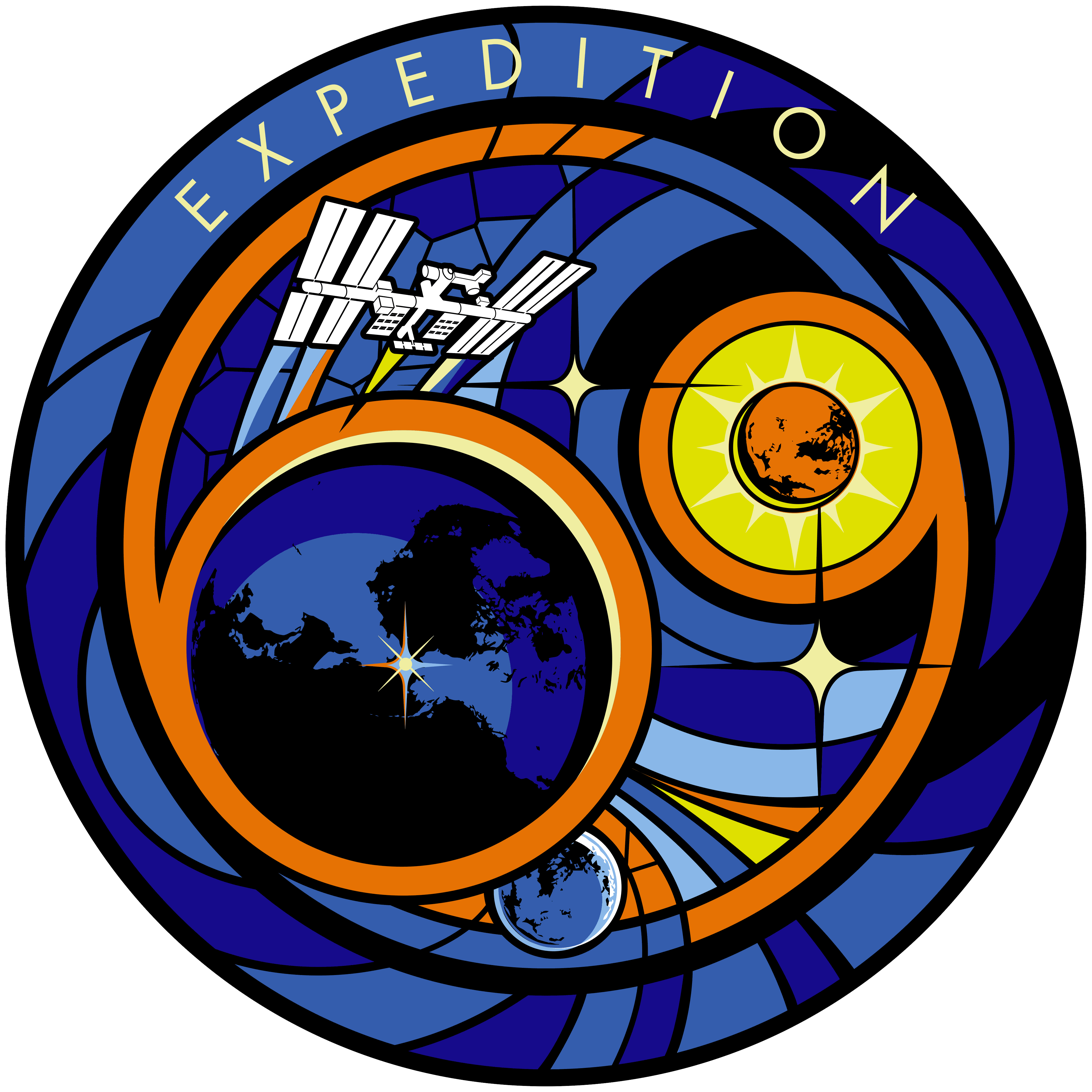
- Mission insignia

Francisco "Frank" Carlos Rubio (born December 11, 1975) is a Salvadoran-American US Army flight surgeon, aviator, and NASA astronaut. He holds the American record for the longest single spaceflight at nearly 371 days. In June 2026, he was announced as a mission specialist on Artemis III.

== Early life and education ==
Francisco Rubio was born on December 11, 1975 to Salvadoran parents. As a child, he lived in El Salvador for the first six years of his life, after which his family moved to Miami, Florida, where he attended Miami Sunset Senior High School. He attended the United States Military Academy and earned a bachelor's degree in international relations.

== Military career ==
After commissioning as a second lieutenant in the US Army, Rubio became a UH-60 Blackhawk pilot. Rubio was a platoon leader in A Company, 2nd Battalion, 82nd Aviation Regiment, and a company commander for A Company, 2nd Battalion, 3rd Aviation Regiment. As a pilot, Rubio had over 1,100 hours of flying time, including 600 combat hours during operations in Bosnia, Iraq, and Afghanistan.

Rubio received a Doctorate of Medicine from the Uniformed Services University of the Health Sciences, and completed a family medicine residency at Fort Benning. He served as a clinic supervisor and flight surgeon at Redstone Arsenal. At the time of his selection as an astronaut candidate, Rubio was the surgeon for 3rd Battalion, 10th Special Forces Group at Fort Carson.

== NASA career ==
In 2017, Rubio was selected as a member of NASA Astronaut Group 22 and began his two-year training.

=== Expedition 67/68/69 ===
On July 15, 2022, NASA announced he would fly onboard Soyuz MS-22 on a mission to the International Space Station.

Rubio launched aboard Soyuz MS-22 alongside Roscosmos cosmonauts Sergey Prokopyev and Dmitry Petelin on September 21, 2022. His mission was originally planned to last around six months with a return to Earth in early 2023. However, damage to the spacecraft extended the mission, and Rubio returned to Earth on Soyuz MS-23 on September 27, 2023, breaking Mark T. Vande Hei's previous record for the longest spaceflight by an American astronaut with 371 days.

=== Artemis III ===
On June 9, 2026, NASA announced Rubio as a mission specialist of the Artemis III mission to low Earth orbit, along with NASA astronauts Randy Bresnik and Andre Douglas and ESA astronaut Luca Parmitano.

== Personal life ==
Rubio and his wife, Deborah, have four children.

== Awards and honors ==
Rubio has received the Defense Superior Service Medal, Legion of Merit, Bronze Star with two oak leaf clusters, Meritorious Service Medal with three oak leaf clusters, Air Medal, Army Commendation Medal with four oak leaf clusters, Army Achievement Medal with four oak leaf clusters, NATO Medal, and the Armed Forces Expeditionary Medal.

His other decorations include the Combat Action Badge, Senior Aviator Badge with Astronaut Device, Flight Surgeon Badge, Parachutist Badge, Senior Space Badge, Pathfinder Badge, and Air Assault Badge. He is a graduate of the US Army Command and General Staff College.

== See also ==
- List of spaceflight records
- Valeri Polyakov, holds the overall record for longest stay in space
