= Andre Douglas =

American engineer and astronaut (born 1985)

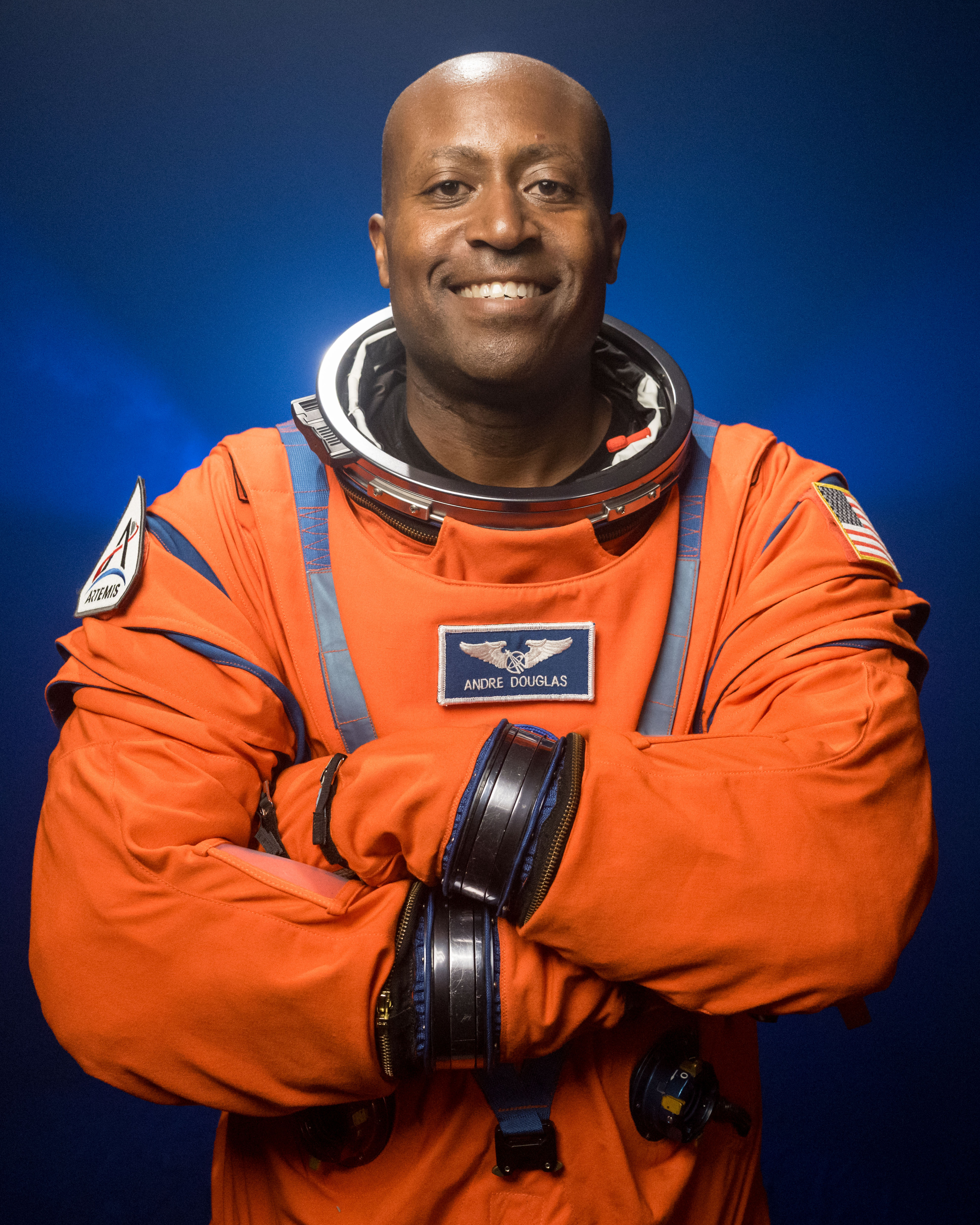
- Douglas in 2026
- Born: December 11, 1985 (age 40); Miami, Florida, U.S.
- Education: United States Coast Guard Academy (BS); University of Michigan (MS, MS); Johns Hopkins University (MS); George Washington University (PhD)
- Spouse: Rachel Stapleton
- Children: 2
- Space career

NASA astronaut
- Selection: NASA Group 23 (2021)
- Military career
- Branch: United States Coast Guard
- Years: 2008‍–‍2015, 2024‍–‍present
- Rank: Commander
- Scientific career
- Fields: Systems engineering
- Thesis: Designing Complex Adaptive Systems Using a Stakeholder-Driven and Goal-Focused Framework (2021)
- Doctoral advisors: Shahram Sarkani; Thomas Mazzuchi

Andre Douglas (born December 11, 1985) is an American systems engineer, a Coast Guard Reserve officer, and NASA astronaut, and was chosen as a backup crew member for the Artemis II mission under NASA's Artemis program. In 2026, he was announced as a mission specialist on the Artemis III mission.

== Personal life and education ==
Douglas was born in Miami, Florida, and raised in Chesapeake, Virginia. He graduated from Western Branch High School in 2004, where he was a member of the National Honor Society.

He earned a bachelor’s degree in mechanical engineering from the U.S. Coast Guard Academy in 2008, where he also served as regimental commander. He was on the Men's Track Team and Chess Team.

Douglas later completed four post-graduate degrees: a master's degree in mechanical engineering and a master’s degree in naval architecture and marine engineering, both from the University of Michigan (2012), a master's degree in electrical and computer engineering from Johns Hopkins University (2019), and a doctorate in systems engineering from George Washington University (2021).

As of April 2025, Douglas is married and has two sons. In his free time, he enjoys soccer, basketball, kayaking, hiking, running, ping-pong, billiards, chess, and watching movies.

== Career ==
=== U.S. Coast Guard ===
After graduating from the academy in 2008, Douglas served as an officer in the U.S. Coast Guard, holding operational and engineering roles. His first assignment was aboard the Coast Guard Cutter Vigilant based out of Cape Canaveral, Florida, where he participated in migrant interdiction, humanitarian relief, and drug enforcement operations. He later worked at the Coast Guard Marine Safety Center, conducting hundreds of technical reviews for maritime compliance and providing global support on maritime casualty response as a naval architect.

=== Applied Physics Laboratory ===
In 2015, Douglas transitioned out of active duty and joined the Johns Hopkins University Applied Physics Laboratory (APL), contributing to space exploration, underwater robotics, and ocean systems missions. He played a key role in enhancing U.S. ballistic missile defense, piloted unmanned surface vessels in Navy operations, and supported NASA's Double Asteroid Redirection Test (DART) mission. He also contributed to MEGANE, a gamma-ray and neutron spectrometer for Japan’s Martian Moons eXploration spacecraft. His research focused on autonomous swarm behaviors in unmanned systems, predicting and quantifying their performance over time. As part of the Lunar Surface Innovation Consortium at APL, he collaborated with NASA to assess lunar surface needs and guide technology development.

== NASA career ==
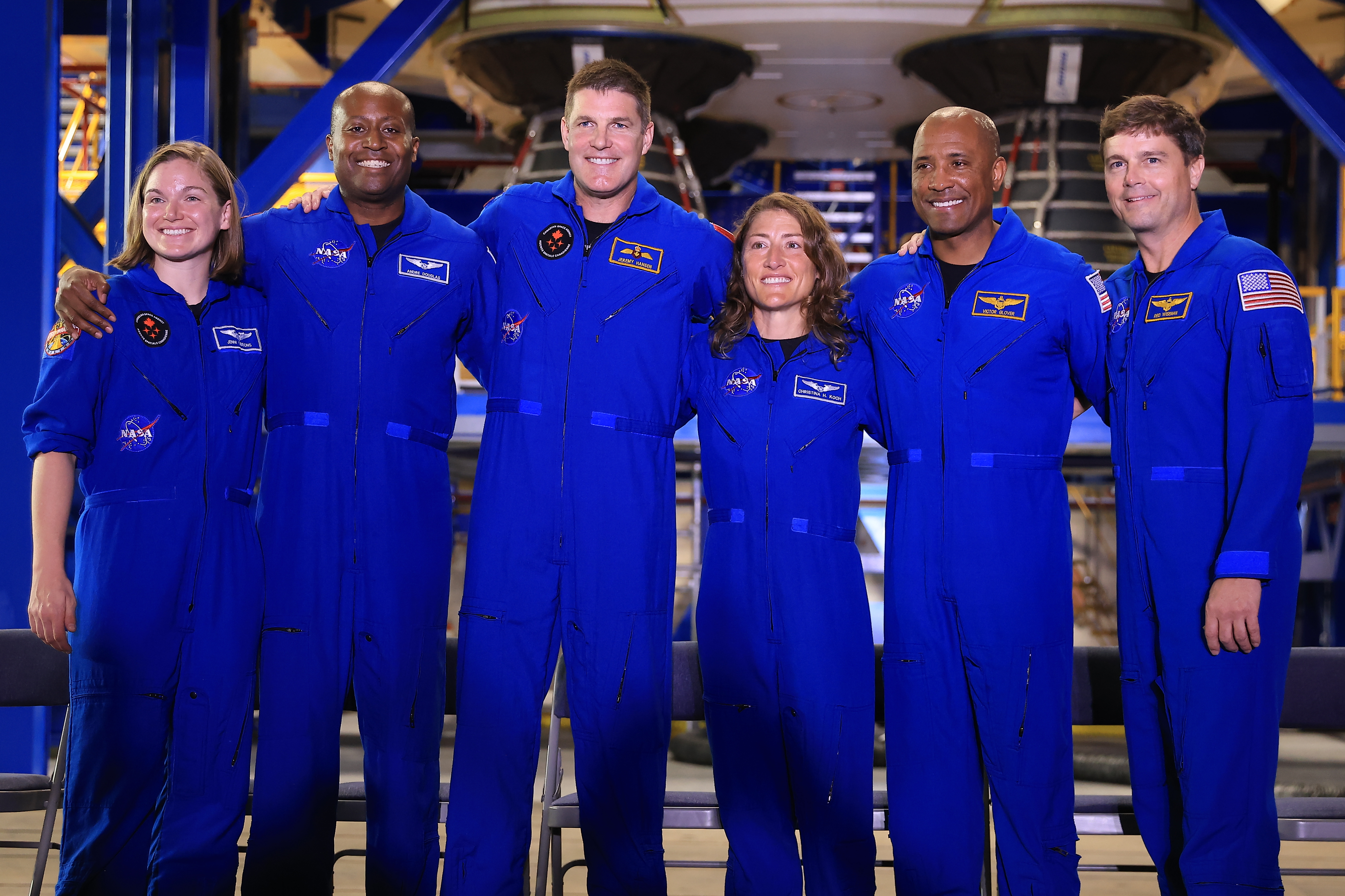
Douglas (second from left) with the other backup and prime crewmembers of Artemis II after a news conference in December 2024

On December 6, 2021, Douglas was selected as one of 10 candidates in the NASA Astronaut Group 23. He reported for duty in January 2022 and completed astronaut candidate training on March 5, 2024. After graduation, Douglas was commissioned as a commander in the Coast Guard Reserve. In addition to his NASA duties, he will serve on an advisory group to the Commandant of the Coast Guard focusing on autonomous maritime systems, public affairs, and recruiting.

On July 3, 2024, NASA announced Douglas as the backup crew member for Artemis II, the first crewed test flight of the Artemis program. He trained alongside NASA astronauts Reid Wiseman, Victor Glover, and Christina Koch. If one of them had been unable to participate in the mission, Douglas would have taken their place. On launch day, Douglas also served as a member of the closeout crew as an Astronaut Support Person, who strapped the other astronauts into their seats as they boarded the Orion capsule. The approximately 10-day Artemis II test flight launched on NASA's Space Launch System (SLS) rocket, testing the Orion spacecraft’s life-support systems, and validating the capabilities and techniques needed for humans to live and work in deep space. The mission launched on April 1, 2026, at 6:35:12 PM EDT.

=== Artemis III ===
On June 9, 2026, NASA announced Douglas as a mission specialist of the Artemis III mission to low Earth orbit, along with NASA astronauts Randy Bresnik and Frank Rubio and ESA astronaut Luca Parmitano.
