= Close-out (aerospace) =

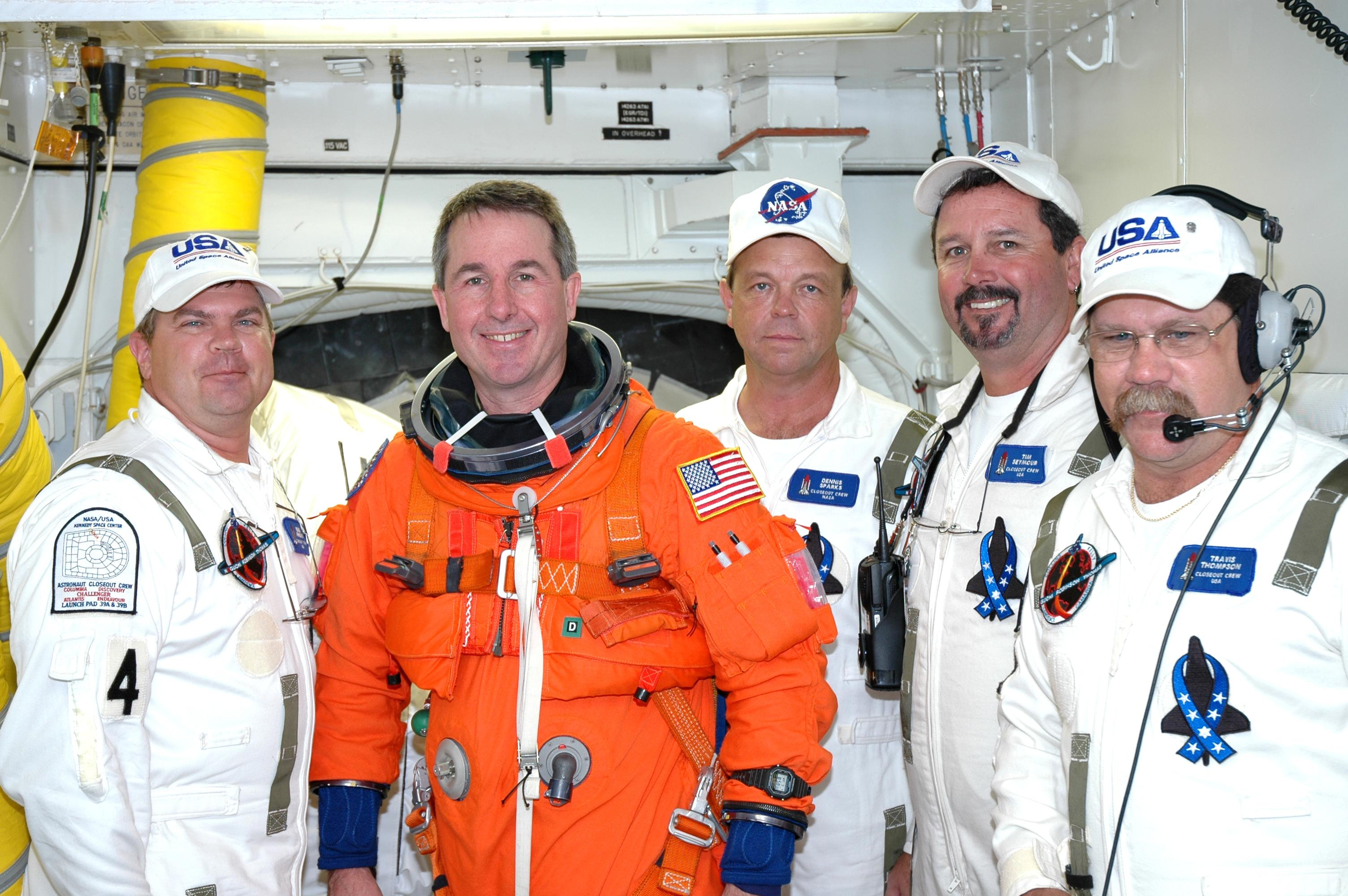
The Space Shuttle close-out crew poses with an astronaut in the white room.

Closeout is the process that is completed in preparing an aircraft or spacecraft and its crew for flight.

The seven members of the Space Shuttle closeout crew help astronauts strap in and take care of any other last-minute needs that arise. The crew is also responsible for closing and sealing the crew access hatch and are the last non-crew members that astronauts see before returning from the mission. The Shuttle closeout crew consists of elite technicians, an active astronaut who is not assigned to that mission and a NASA quality inspector.
