= Luca Parmitano =

Italian astronaut, pilot and engineer (born 1976)

Luca Parmitano OMRI
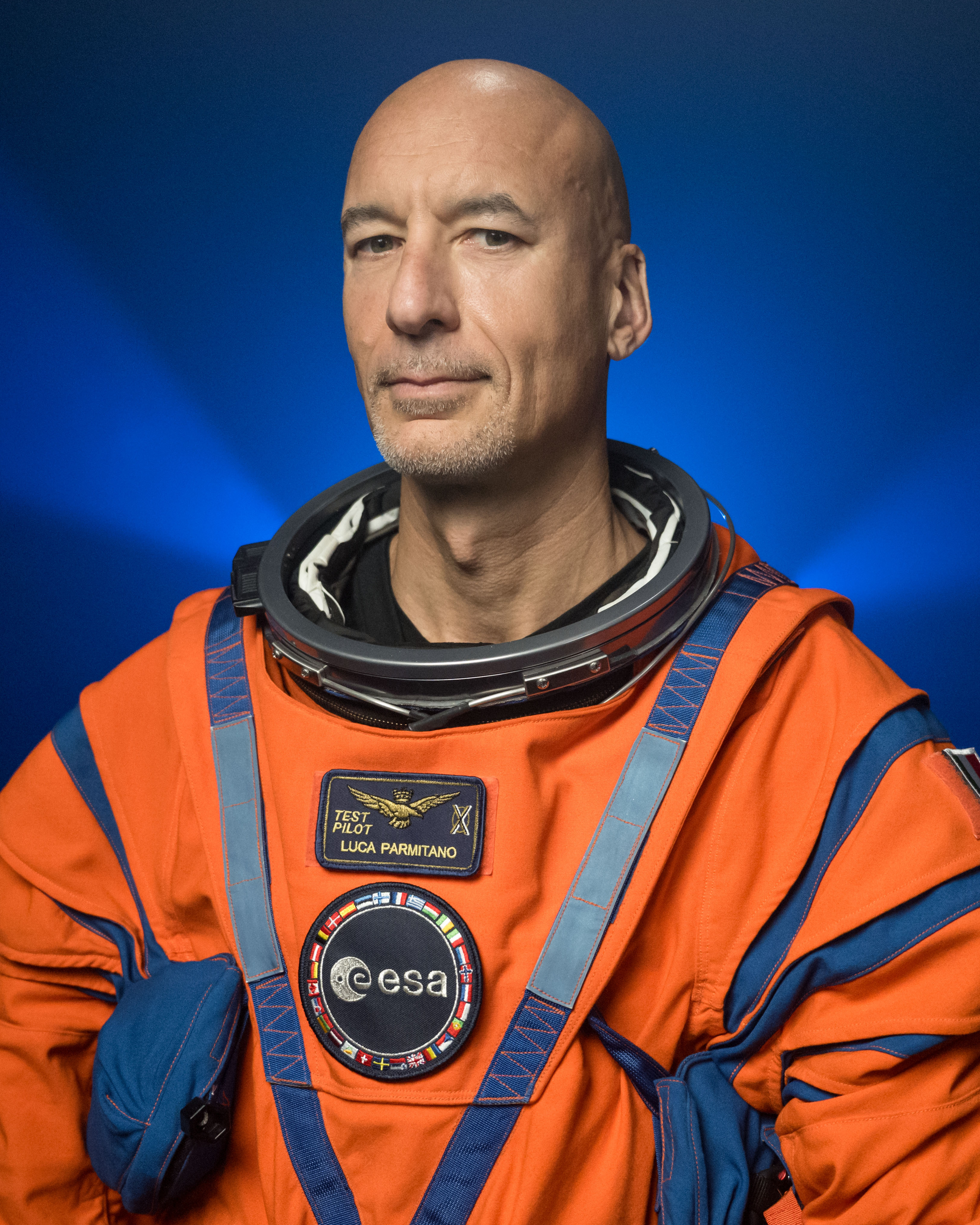
- Parmitano in 2026
- Born: 27 September 1976 (age 50); Paternò, Italy
- Education: University of Naples Federico II; Accademia Aeronautica
- Space career

ESA astronaut
- Previous occupation: Test Pilot
- Status: Active
- Rank: Colonel, Italian Air Force
- Time in space: 366 days, 23 hours, 1 minute
- Selection: 2009 ESA Group
- Total EVAs: 6
- Total EVA time: 33 hours, 9 minutes
- Missions: Soyuz TMA-09M (Expedition 36/37); Soyuz MS-13 (Expedition 60/61)
- Website: lucaparmitano.esa.int

Luca Salvo Parmitano (born 27 September 1976) is an Italian astronaut in the European Astronaut Corps for the European Space Agency (ESA). He was selected as an ESA astronaut in May 2009. Parmitano is also a colonel and test pilot for the Italian Air Force. He is the first Italian (and the third European) to command the International Space Station (ISS) during Expedition 61. In June 2026, he was announced as the pilot on Artemis III as part of NASA's Artemis program.

== Background ==
Parmitano considers Catania his hometown. He is divorced and has two daughters with his ex-wife. He is an active scuba diver and enjoys snowboarding, skydiving, weight training and swimming. Other interests include reading and listening to and playing music.

== Education ==
Parmitano graduated from the Liceo Scientifico Statale "Galileo Galilei" in Catania, Italy, in 1995. Parmitano spent a year (1993) as an exchange student at Mission Viejo High School in Mission Viejo, California in the United States with AFS Intercultural Programs.

In 1999, he completed a master's degree in political sciences at the University of Naples Federico II, Italy, with a thesis on international law. In 2000, he graduated with Sparviero IV academic course, from the Italian Accademia Aeronautica, in Pozzuoli, Italy.

Parmitano completed basic training with the U.S. Air Force at the Euro-NATO Joint Jet Pilot Training Program at Sheppard Air Force Base in Texas in the United States in 2001. He completed the JCO/CAS course with the United States Air Forces in Europe (USAFE) in Sembach, Germany, in 2002.

In 2003, he qualified as Electronic Warfare Officer at the Reparto Supporto Tecnico Operativo Guerra Elettronica (ReSTOGE) in Pratica di Mare, Italy. He completed the Tactical Leadership Programme (TLP) in Florennes, Belgium, in 2005.

In July 2009, Parmitano received a master's degree in experimental flight test engineering at the Institut Supérieur de l'Aéronautique et de l'Espace (ISAE), in Toulouse, France, as part of the test pilot formation at EPNER, the French test pilot school in Istres.

== Special honours ==
In 2007 Parmitano was awarded the Medaglia d'Argento al Valore Aeronautico (Silver Medal of Aeronautic Valor) by the President of the Italian Republic after safely landing his AMX in an emergency due to a bird strike.

Asteroid 37627 Lucaparmitano is named after him.

== Career ==
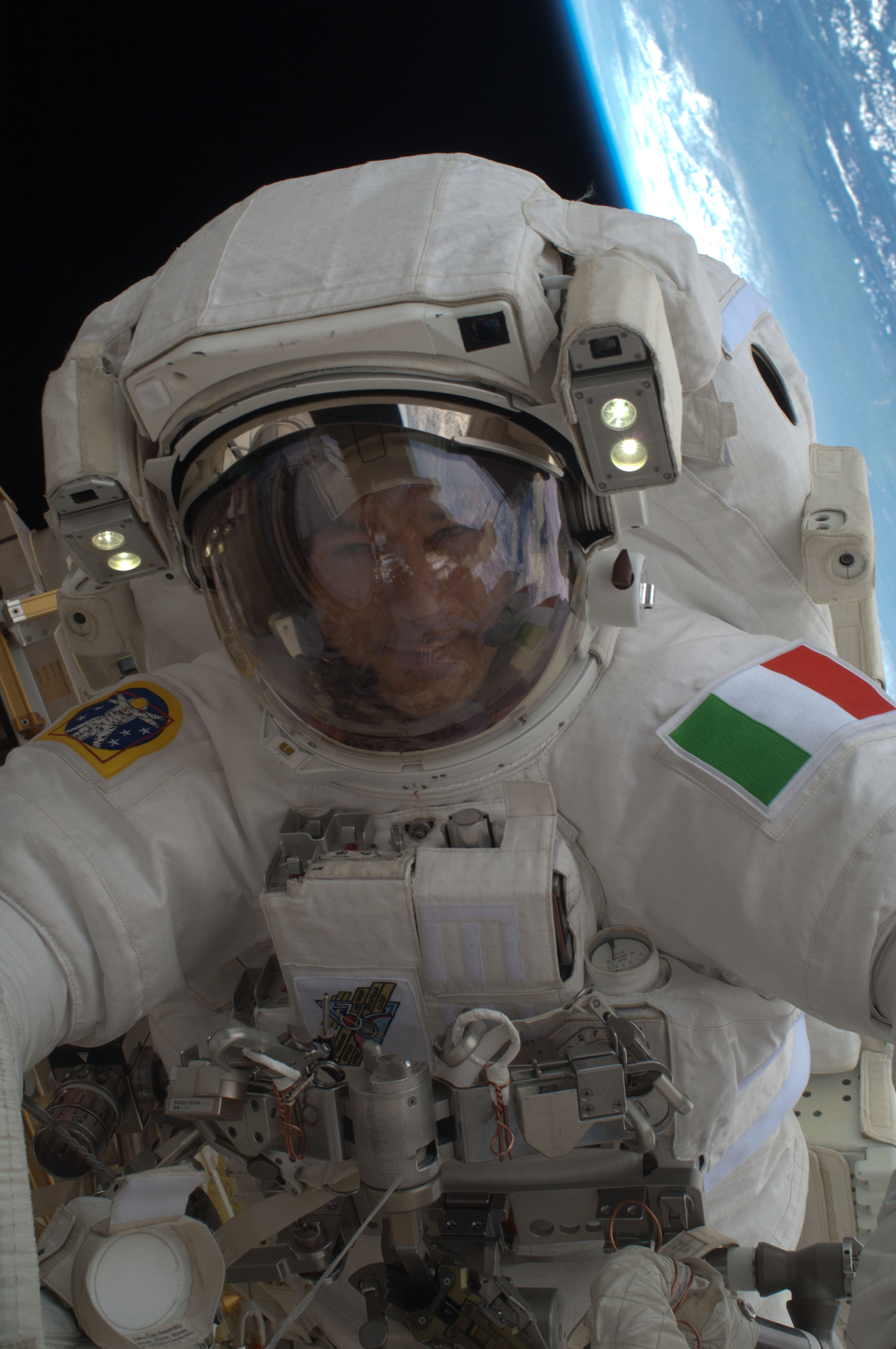
Parmitano performing his first EVA

Parmitano is a Colonel in the Italian Air Force and an astronaut of the European Space Agency. He has logged more than 2000 hours flying time, is qualified on more than 20 types of military aircraft (both fixed-wing and rotary-wing) and has flown over 40 types of aircraft.

Following completion of undergraduate pilot training in 2001, Parmitano flew the AMX aircraft with the 13th Squadron, 32nd Wing in Amendola, Italy, from 2001 to 2007. During that time, he obtained all the qualifications on that aircraft, including Combat Ready, Four Ship Leader, and Mission Commander/Package Leader.

Within the 13th Squadron, he served as Chief of Training Section and Commander of the 76th Flight. He was also the 32nd Wing Electronic Warfare Officer (EWO).

In 2007, he was selected by the Italian Air Force to become a test pilot and qualified as Experimental Test Pilot at EPNER, the French test pilot school in Istres.

== In ESA ==
In May 2009, Parmitano was selected as an ESA astronaut as part of the 2009 class.

In 2014, he became a "cavenaut" serving in ESA CAVES training of the European Space Agency alongside Scott Tingle, Alexander Mirsurkin, Sergey Kud-Sverchkov and Matthias Maurer.

In July 2015, Parmitano became an aquanaut when he served as commander of the NEEMO 20 crew.

In 2016, Parmitano took part in the first ESA PANGAEA mission, alongside Matthias Maurer and Pedro Duque.

In May 2017, Parmitano took part in the CAVES eXpedition One, carried out in the extreme environments of some hot caves in Sicily.

In early 2026, various agreements were signed between the Italian Space Agency (ASI) and the National Aeronautics and Space Administration (NASA) to have potentially two italian astronauts on the Moon. Considering the roster of active and future italian astronauts, Parmitano is one of the most likely candidate to be the first italian to land on the Moon. The other astronauts are Samantha Cristoforetti, Walter Villadei, Andrea Patassa and Anthea Comellini.

=== Expedition 36/37 ===
In February 2011, he was assigned as a flight engineer to Expedition 36/37 (a long-duration mission to the International Space Station), which launched aboard Soyuz TMA-09M on 28 May 2013 and arrived at the ISS on 29 May. His mission is called Volare, which means "to fly" in Italian and is reminiscent of a very famous song by the Italian singer Domenico Modugno.

In May 2013 Parmitano partnered with his 15-year-old mentee Abigail Harrison to have her serve as his Earth liaison during his mission on Expedition 36 and Expedition 37. Harrison shared Parmitano's experience of living in space on the International Space Station with her online community on social media and her blog, where she is known as "Astronaut Abby".

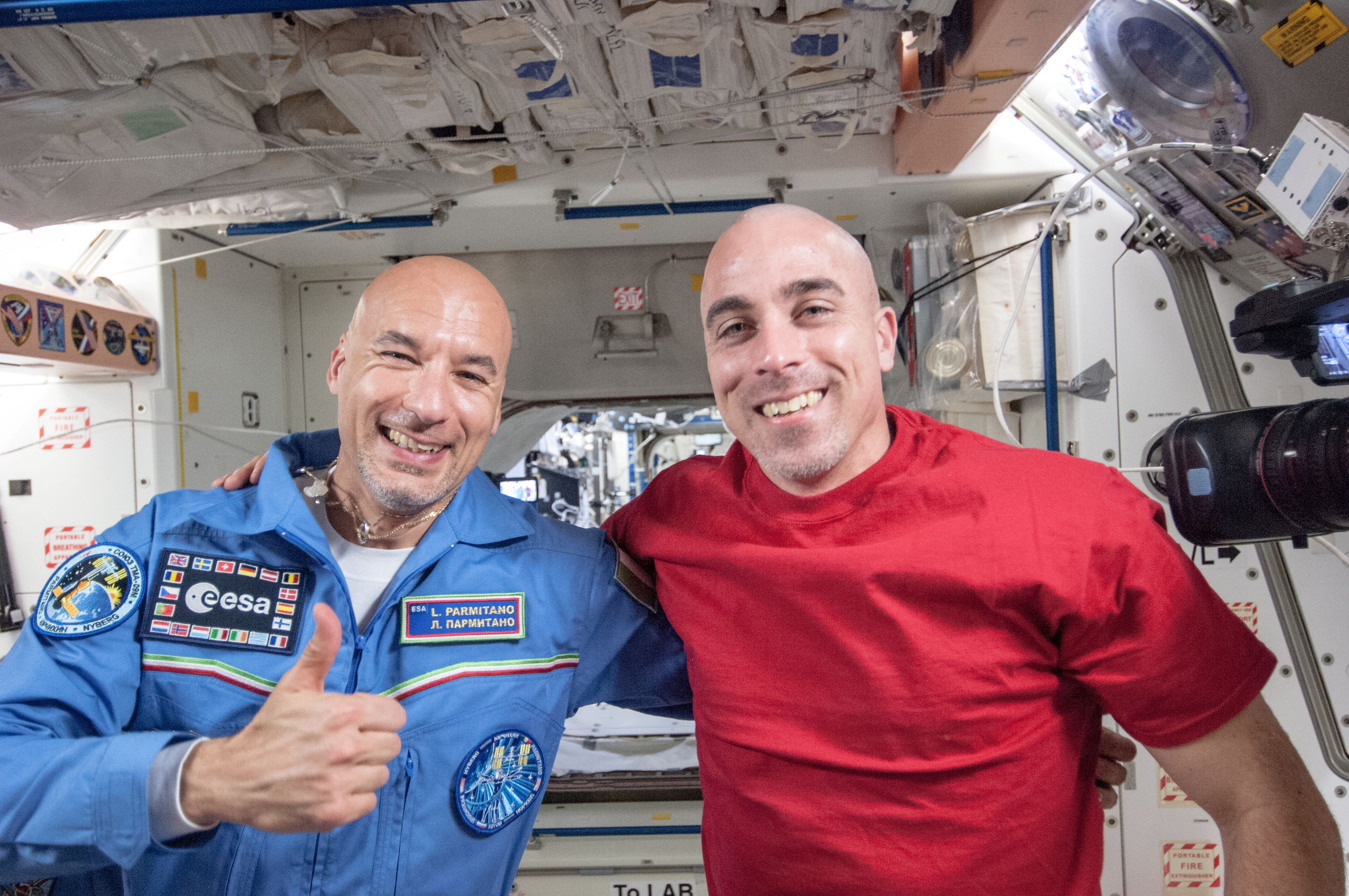
Parmitano (left), pictured with Expedition 36 crew member Chris Cassidy

On 9 July 2013, he became the first Italian to take part in a spacewalk as he and Chris Cassidy conducted an EVA out of the ISS's quest airlock to install power cables, retrieve material research samples (MISSE-8) and accomplish a number of maintenance tasks. During the EVA, Parmitano also got to ride on the ISS's Mobile Servicing System for the installation of a couple of radiator grapple bars previously flown up on SpaceX' CRS-2 mission. The EVA was part of preparations for the new Russian multipurpose module planned to replace the Pirs docking compartment by the end of 2013. In 2013, AOL's BermanBraun listed his space selfie taken during this spacewalk as one of the 50 best space photos of the year.

Video of latter part of 16 July 2013 EVA

His second EVA on 16 July 2013 was terminated after only 1 hour and 32 minutes, when the helmet of his Extravehicular Mobility Unit suit started filling with water. Water in his helmet posed the danger of drowning and made his return to the airlock even more difficult, as orbital sunset had occurred just before he started to return. Engineers found that contamination had clogged one of the suit's filters, causing water from the suit's cooling system to back up. Parmitano returned to Earth on 11 November 2013 aboard Soyuz TMA-09M. Later, on 15 January 2016, astronaut Timothy Kopra experienced a similar water leak in his spacesuit.

=== Expedition 60/61 ===
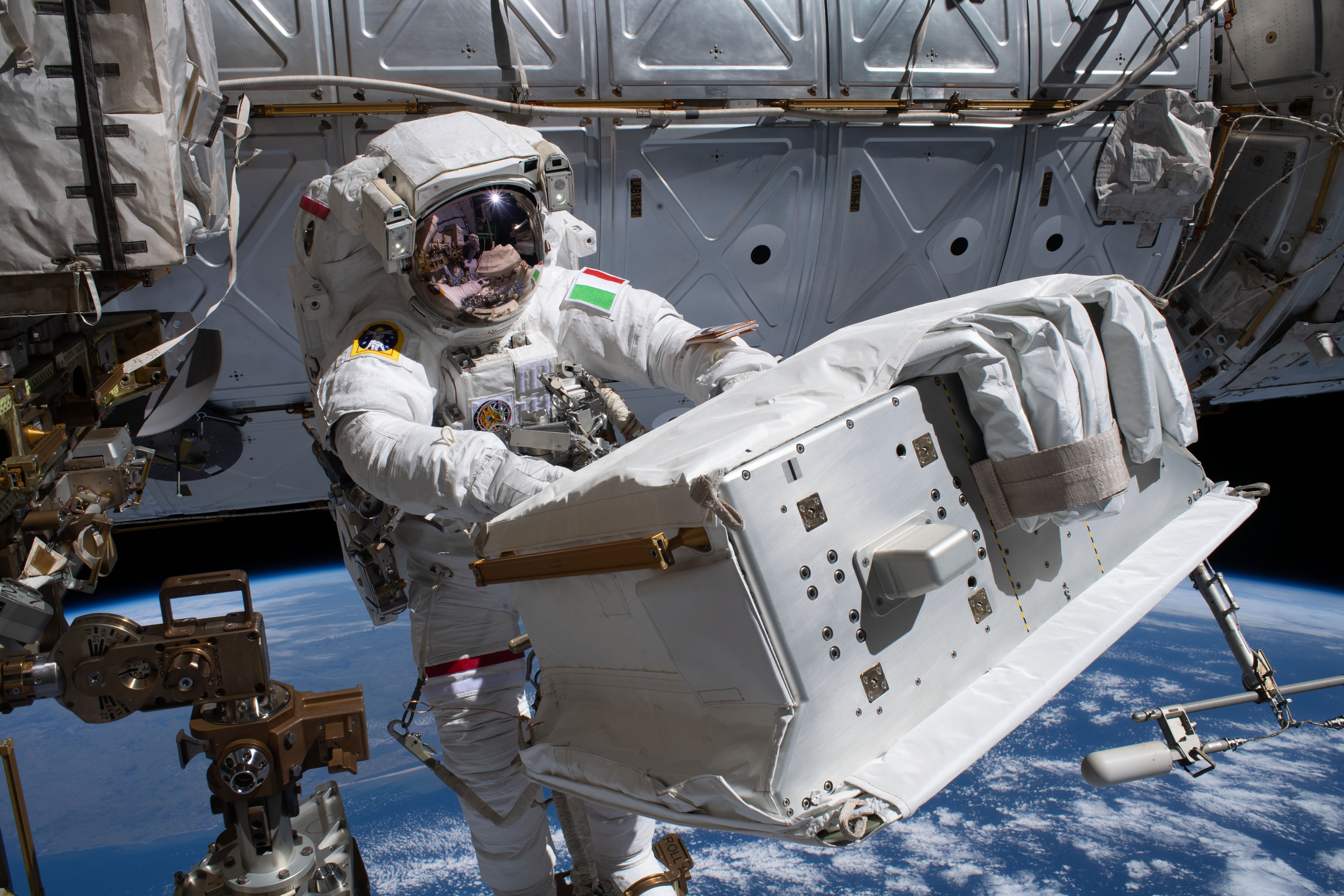
Luca Parmitano, attached to the Canadarm2 robotic arm, carries the new thermal pump system for AMS.

In May 2018, ESA announced that Parmitano would return to the space station on board the Soyuz MS-13 mission to serve as a flight engineer on Expedition 60 and commander of Expedition 61. Parmitano launched on 20 July 2019 and arrived at the International Space Station on the same day. He became the first DJ in space on 13 August 2019, when he played a set of electronic music from the ISS for a music festival audience in Ibiza. On 15 November he ventured outside the ISS for the first time since his ill-fated spacewalk in 2013, on the first of at least four spacewalks to repair the Alpha Magnetic Spectrometer. Parmitano conducted the spacewalks to repair AMS together with NASA astronaut Andrew Morgan. Both were assisted by NASA astronauts Christina Koch and Jessica Meir who operated the Canadarm2 robotic arm from inside the Station. The spacewalks were described as the "most challenging since Hubble repairs". It was the first time astronauts cut and reconnect cooling lines in orbit. The repair of AMS was completed after four spacewalks. In the last spacewalk, Parmitano found a leak in one of AMS's cooling lines. The leak was fixed during the spacewalk.

Expedition 61 ended with the landing of Soyuz MS-13 on 6 February 2020. Aboard were Parmitano, Aleksandr Skvortsov, and Christina Koch.

=== Artemis III ===
On June 9, 2026, NASA announced Parmitano as the pilot of the Artemis III mission to low Earth orbit, along with NASA astronauts Randy Bresnik, Frank Rubio, and Andre Douglas.

Preceded by Aleksey Ovchinin	ISS Commander (Expedition 61); 3 October 2019 to 6 February 2020	Succeeded by Oleg Skripochka
