= Artemis III =

Upcoming crewed mission of the Artemis program

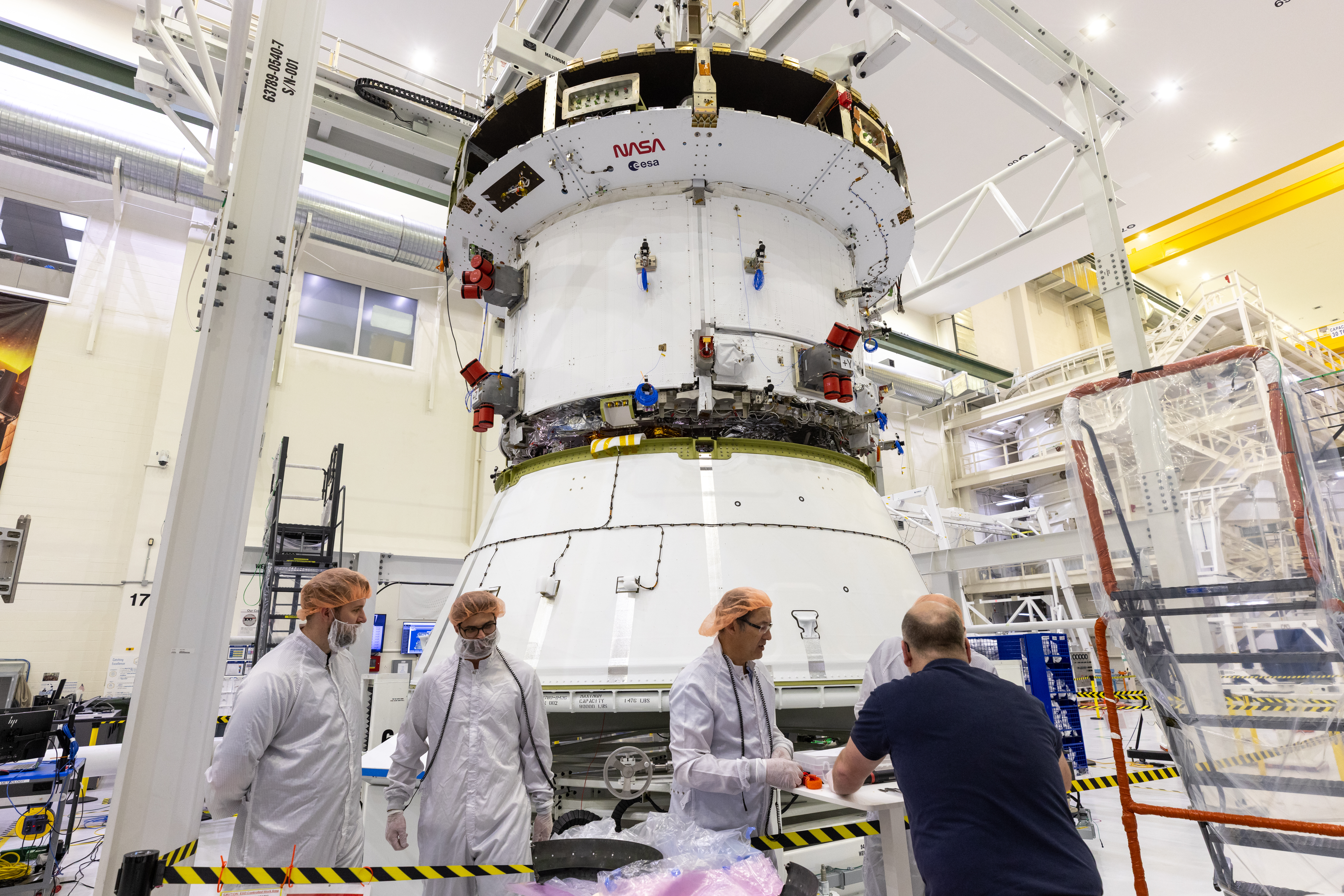
- Assembly of the European Service Module for the planned mission
- Names: Exploration Mission-3 (EM-3)
- Mission type: Crewed demonstration flight
- Operator: NASA
- Website: nasa.gov/mission/artemis-iii
- Mission duration: ≈2 weeks (planned)

Spacecraft properties
- Spacecraft: Orion CM-004; ESM-3; Human Landing System (HLS) test article(s)
- Manufacturer: Orion: Lockheed Martin; ESM: Airbus Defence and Space; HLS: Blue Origin and SpaceX

Crew
- Crew size: 4
- Members: Randy Bresnik; Luca Parmitano; Frank Rubio; Andre Douglas

Start of mission
- Launch date: NET June 2027 (planned)
- Rocket: Space Launch System (crew); SpaceX Super Heavy, New Glenn (HLS test articles)
- Launch site: Kennedy, LC-39B (Orion), LC-39A (Starship V3); Cape Canaveral SFS, LC-36 (Blue Moon)

End of mission
- Landing site: Pacific Ocean (planned)

Orbital parameters
- Reference system: Geocentric orbit
- Regime: Low Earth orbit
- Altitude: ≈230 nmi (430 km; 260 mi)
- Inclination: 33°
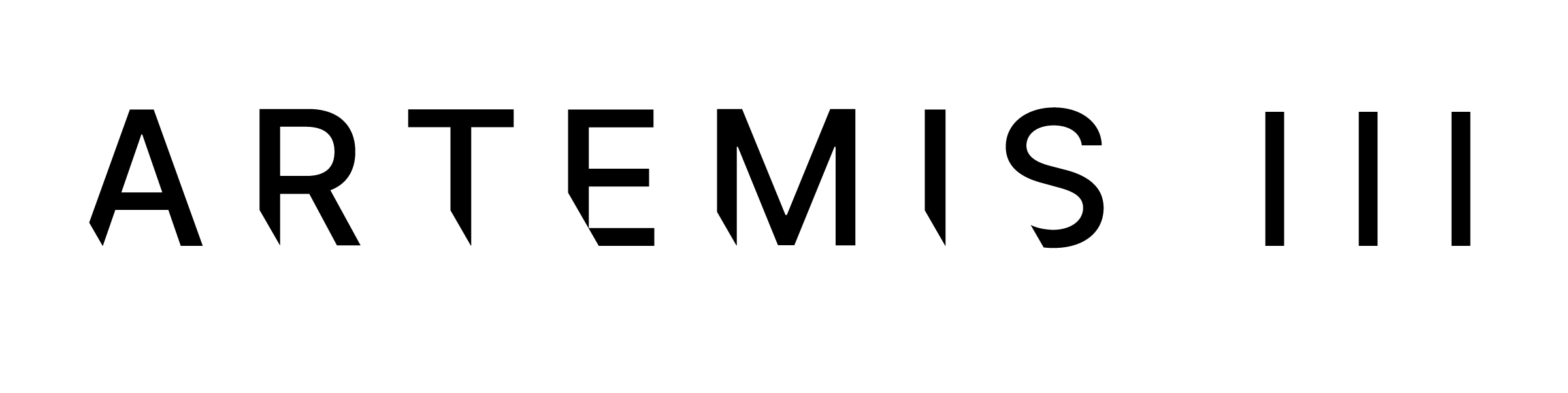
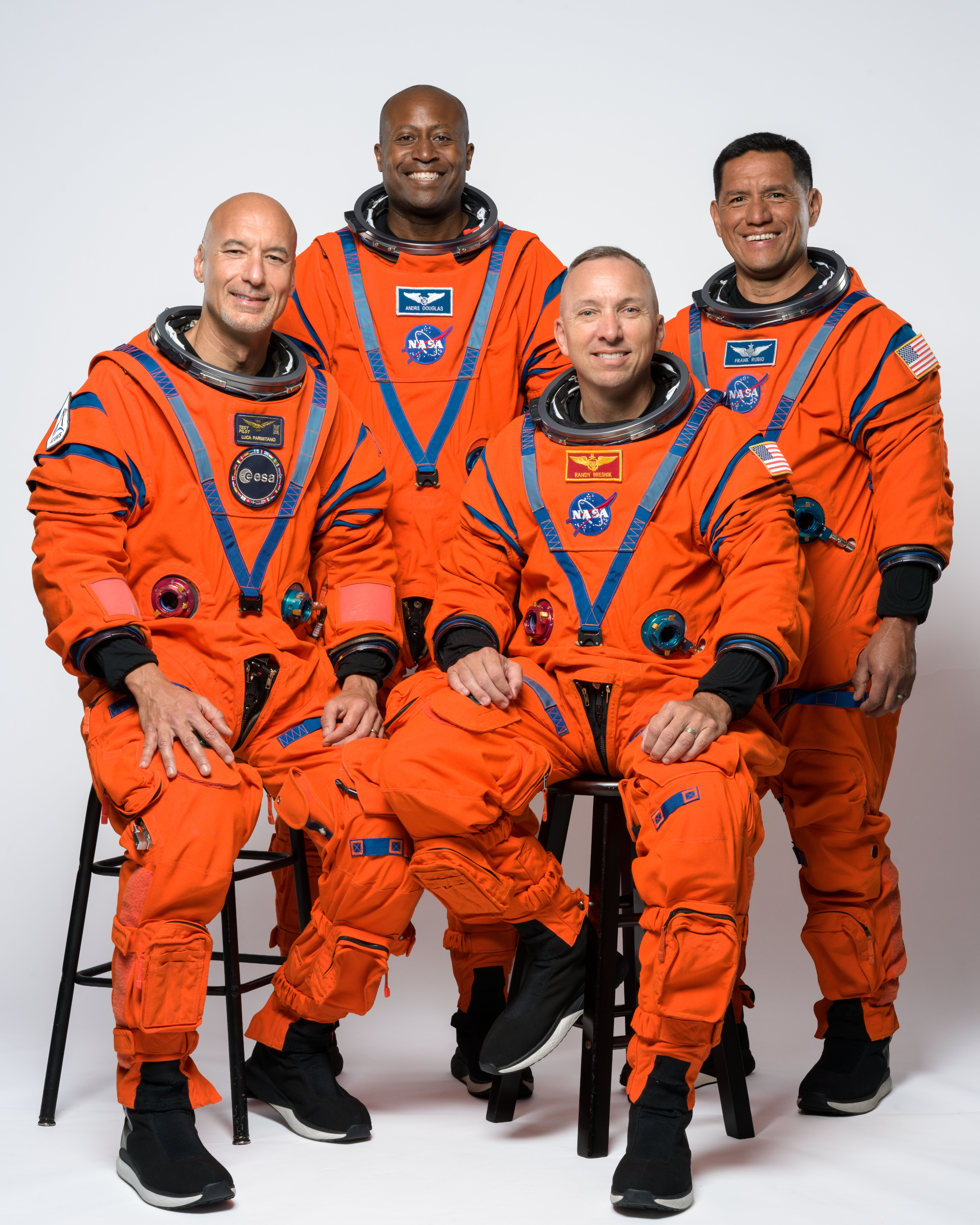
- Mission wordmark Crew portrait, from left to right: Parmitano, Douglas, Bresnik, and Rubio Artemis program

Artemis III is an upcoming crewed spaceflight mission of the NASA-led Artemis program. Planned for 2027, the mission is designed as a demonstration flight in low Earth orbit rather than a lunar landing. Four astronauts will launch aboard the Orion spacecraft on the Space Launch System (SLS) rocket from Kennedy Space Center in Florida.

The mission will test rendezvous and docking operations between Orion and test versions of commercial Human Landing System spacecraft being developed by Blue Origin and SpaceX. NASA describes Artemis III as a risk-reduction mission intended to support Artemis IV, planned as the first crewed lunar landing of the Artemis program. Prior to February 2026, Artemis III had the role of Artemis IV.

== Mission overview ==
Mission overview as of October 2026

NASA describes the mission as one of the most complex human spaceflight missions it has ever attempted, involving three separate launches of the most powerful rockets in the world, and is intended to evaluate Orion systems, propulsion, communications, operational concepts for future lunar missions, and spacecraft interoperability through a series of rendezvous and docking demonstrations involving NASA and commercial vehicles. NASA has compared the mission to Apollo 9, which tested the Apollo Lunar Module in Earth orbit before it was flown with crew in cislunar space. Simplified test versions of the landers are used rather than full-capability vehicles, so technologies such as large-scale on-orbit cryogenic fluid management are not required. The mission is also intended to exercise a multi-provider, multi-location launch campaign within a short timeframe, with all three launches taking place from Kennedy Space Center.

The mission would begin with the launch of a Blue Origin test vehicle capable of remaining in orbit for up to 90 days. The test article, based on the Blue Moon MK2 crew lander, would be launched on a New Glenn rocket and include a crew module with avionics, a partial life-support system and a reaction control system for attitude control, but no main propulsion system. Nominally, Blue Origin would spend about two weeks testing and checking out the vehicle in orbit before Orion is launched.

A crew of four astronauts would then launch aboard Orion on an SLS Block 1 rocket from Kennedy Space Center Launch Complex 39B. Because the mission would remain in low Earth orbit rather than travel toward the Moon, the SLS will fly without an Interim Cryogenic Propulsion Stage and instead use a non-propulsive spacer with the same dimensions and interface points, manufactured at the Marshall Space Flight Center's Advanced Weld Facility. After separation, Orion's European Service Module would place the spacecraft into a circular orbit approximately 230 nautical miles (430 km; 260 mi) above Earth.

Orion, acting as the active "chaser" vehicle, would rendezvous and dock with the Blue Origin vehicle, which as the passive "target" would hold its orientation for Orion's approach; the timeline allows for more than one docking attempt if necessary. Once docked, Orion would remain attached for approximately two days, with its software and reaction control system providing attitude control for the combined spacecraft in a tail-to-sun orientation. The crew would open the hatch and enter the lander after the vestibule and cabin are pressurized to match Orion's atmosphere, then assess the cabin's habitability, usable volume, translation paths, mobility aids, reach and visibility, stowage access, logistics transfer and lighting. They would also conduct interface tests between the vehicle and the Axiom Extravehicular Mobility Unit (AxEMU) spacesuit. After Orion undocks, the Blue Origin test article would remain in Earth orbit while Blue Origin's ground controllers continue testing its systems.

During this time, a third launch, from SpaceX facilities under construction at Kennedy Space Center, would place a SpaceX Starship V3 vehicle into orbit. After departing the Blue Origin vehicle, Orion would again act as chaser to rendezvous and dock with Starship. The Starship test article would be a standard Starship V3 fitted with a docking mechanism on its nose cone, but without a crew cabin or life support system, and the astronauts would remain aboard Orion throughout the test. Unlike the first docking, this phase would focus on software integration, verifying that Starship can control the attitude of the integrated stack. Orion would remain docked to Starship for approximately one day.

About two weeks after launch, Orion would re-enter Earth's atmosphere using an upgraded heat shield and splash down in the Pacific Ocean off the coast of San Diego. The spacecraft and crew would then be recovered by the U.S. Navy.

== Crew ==
Prime crew
Position	Astronaut
Commander	Randy Bresnik, NASA; Third spaceflight
Pilot	Luca Parmitano, ESA; Third spaceflight
Mission specialist	Frank Rubio, NASA; Second spaceflight
Mission specialist	Andre Douglas, NASA; First spaceflight

Backup crew
Position	Astronaut
Mission specialist	Robert Hines, NASA

NASA announced the Artemis III crew on June 9, 2026, at Johnson Space Center in Houston. The four prime crew members were assigned as Randy Bresnik, commander; Luca Parmitano, pilot; Frank Rubio, mission specialist; and Andre Douglas, mission specialist. Bob Hines was named as backup crew member.

There are no women on the crew, a decision that NASA administrator Jared Isaacman acknowledged had drawn "reactions ranging from disappointment to outrage", but stated that the selected crew members were, "the best astronauts to undertake and complete the mission's objectives". He added that some astronauts were not assigned to Artemis III because they were already scheduled for expeditions to the International Space Station or were considered better suited for later Artemis missions.

== Spacecraft ==
=== Space Launch System ===
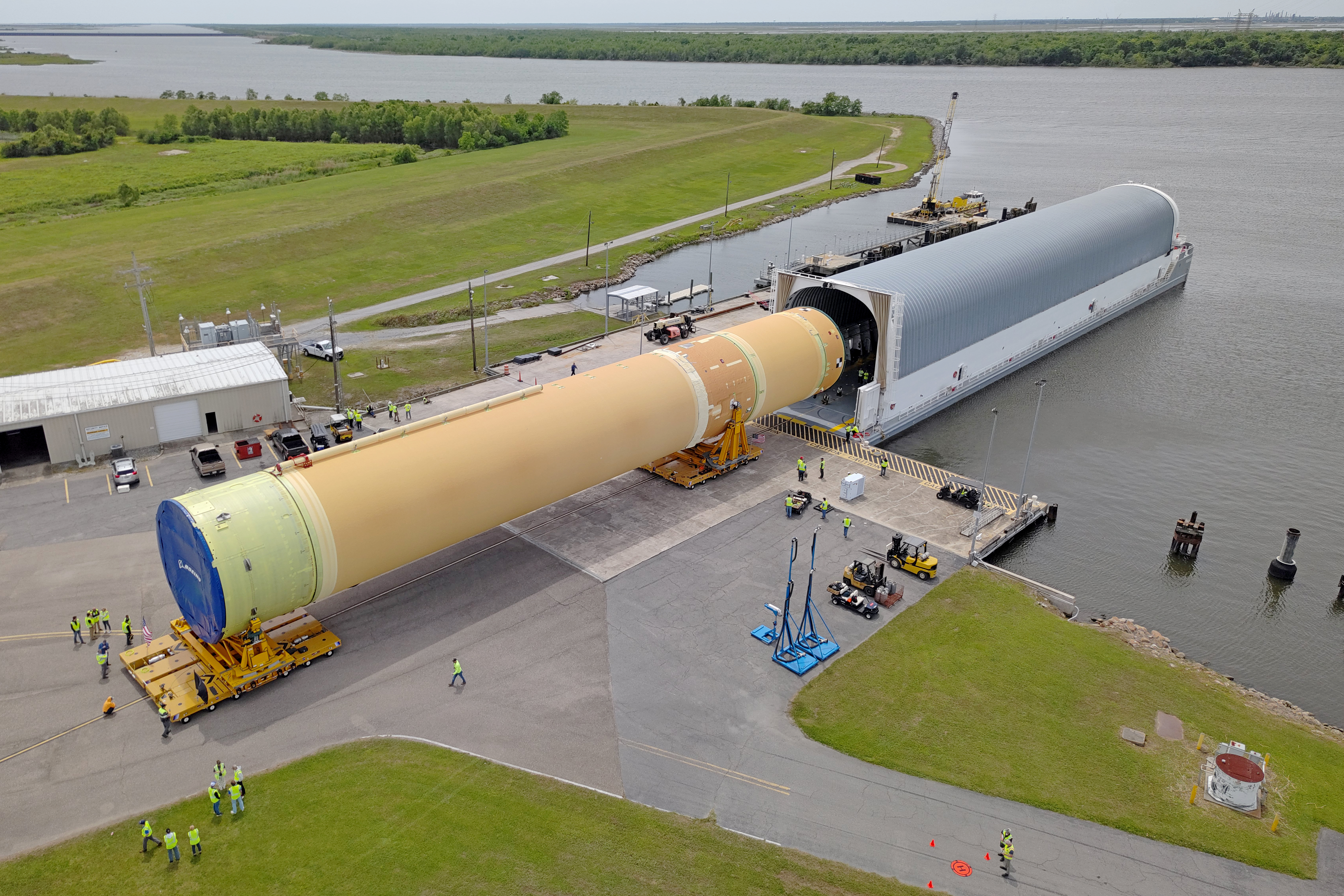
The upper section of the core stage being loaded into the Pegasus barge, April 2026

The Space Launch System (SLS) is a super heavy-lift launch vehicle used to send the Orion spacecraft into orbit. The core stage for this mission is planned to use RS-25 engines E2048, E2052, E2054, and E2057, all of which previously flew on Space Shuttle missions and were refurbished by Aerojet Rocketdyne.

The upper section of the core stage was built by Boeing, including the liquid hydrogen and liquid oxygen tanks, intertank, and forward skirt, was completed in April 2026 at NASA's Michoud Assembly Facility in New Orleans and was delivered to the Kennedy Space Center aboard the Pegasus barge on April 28. After arrival, the engine section, with its RS-25 engines, was installed. The refurbished engines were delivered from Stennis Space Center in Mississippi beginning mid-June and ending July 21, 2026. Integration with the core stage proceeded over the following months, beginning August 24 and finishing September 6.

The mobile launch tower was returned to the Vehicle Assembly Building (VAB) at Kennedy Space Center following Artemis II for refurbishment and preparation for subsequent stacking operations.

In May 2026, NASA announced that the mission will not use the agency's one remaining Interim Cryogenic Propulsion Stage (ICPS), preserving it for use on Artemis IV. Instead, NASA will use a "spacer", a representation of the overall dimensions of an upper stage but without propulsive capabilities. At the time, NASA said that design and fabrication of the spacer was already underway at the Marshall Space Flight Center.

The segments for the solid rocket boosters began to arrive by rail in June 2026 and were stored in the Rotation, Processing and Surge Facility until they were moved to the VAB for the stacking process. By October 13, the VAB workers had completed booster assembly, and by the 28th the core stage had been mated with its boosters in the VAB.

=== Orion ===
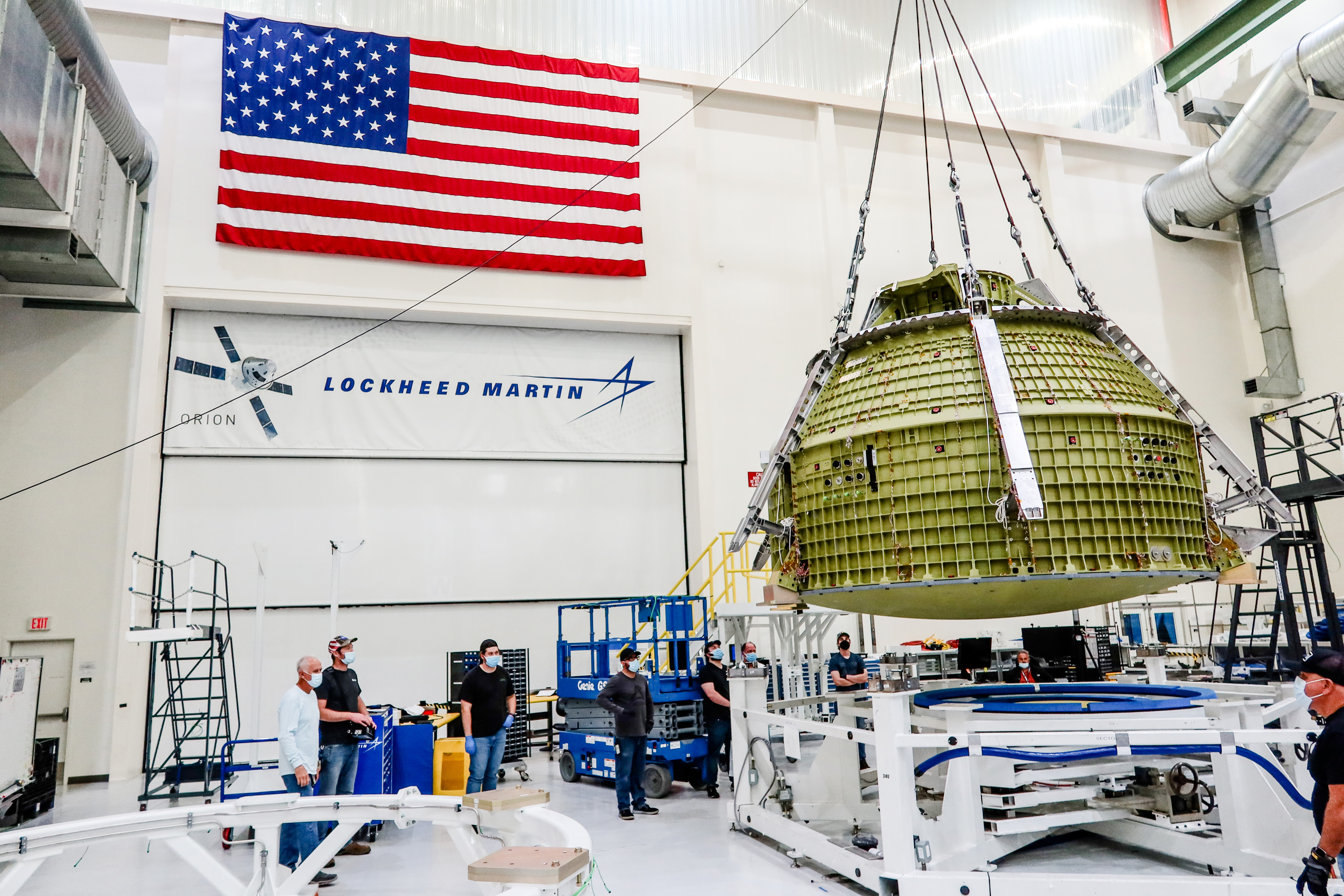
The Orion spacecraft for Artemis III under construction in February 2022

Like the previous two missions, Orion is the crew transport vehicle being used by all of the Artemis missions thereafter. It will transport the crew from Earth to orbit, dock with the HLS lander, and return the crew back to Earth.

The European Service Module (ESM) for Artemis III, ESM-3, was delivered to NASA from the Airbus facility in Bremen, Germany in September 2024.

The spacecraft's pressure vessel was built by Lockheed Martin at the Michoud Assembly Facility and shipped to the Kennedy Space Center in August 2021 for final assembly. As of early 2026, production of the Artemis III Orion spacecraft was ongoing, with an internal readiness date of January 2028. Following a revision to Artemis III mission plans, which target a late 2027 launch, NASA and Lockheed Martin have taken steps to speed up Orion rates.

=== Human Landing System test articles ===
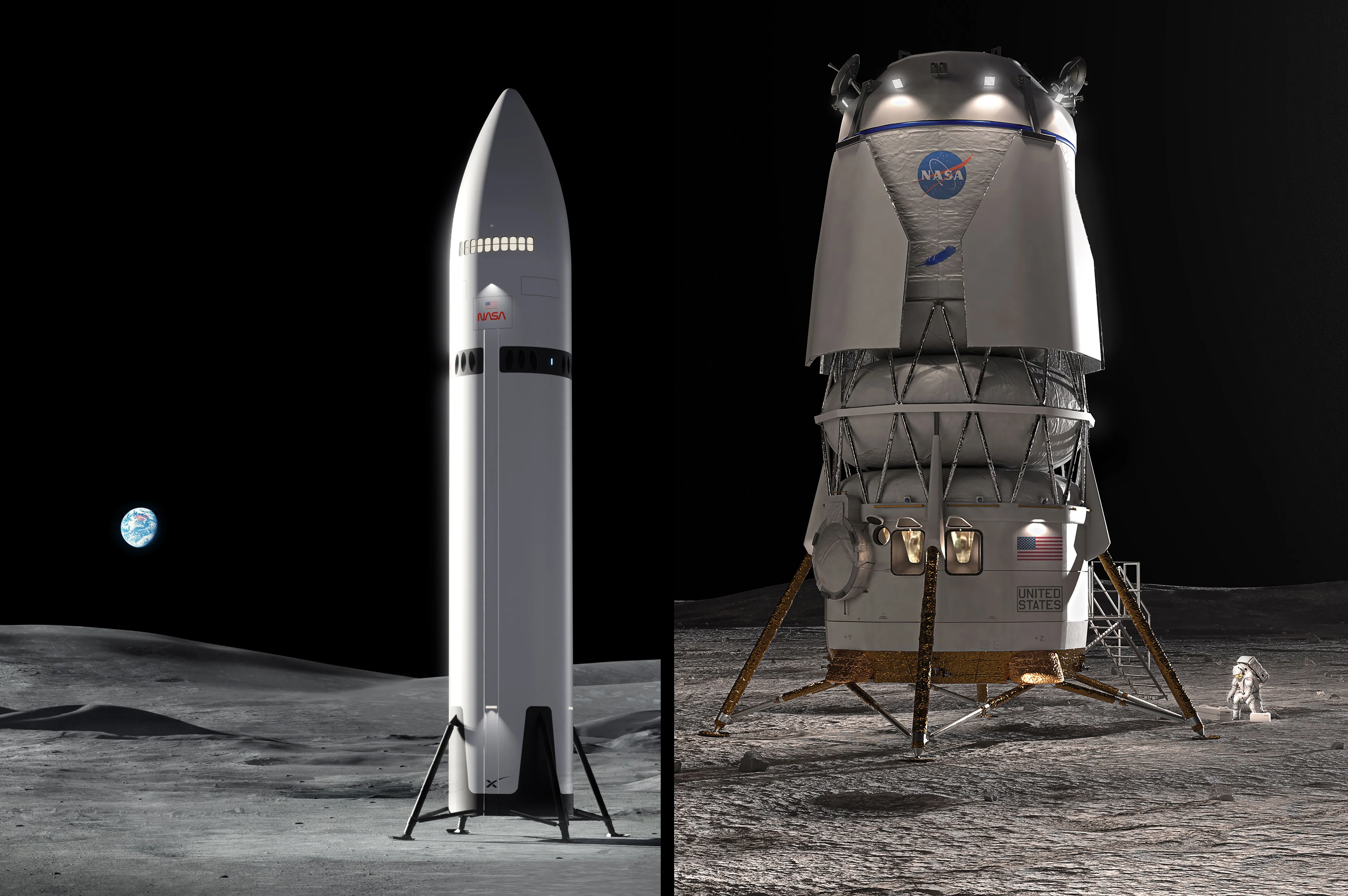
Renderings of the two different types of the Human Landing System (not to scale): SpaceX's Starship HLS (left) and Blue Origin's Blue Moon Mark 2 (right)

Artemis III is planned to evaluate two spacecraft in Earth orbit: a Blue Origin "lander test vehicle" and a SpaceX Starship test article. While these vehicles will be based on the Human Landing System (HLS) vehicles both companies are developing, NASA has called them "pathfinders" and they will be missing several key systems needed for a lunar landing.

The Blue Origin vehicle has been described as a Blue Moon Mark 1.5. It will have the same crew module as the Blue Moon Mark 2 with a functioning life-support system, allowing the Artemis III crew to enter and evaluate its systems. However, its propulsion system will be more like the Mark 1, using storable propellants instead of cryogenic fuels.

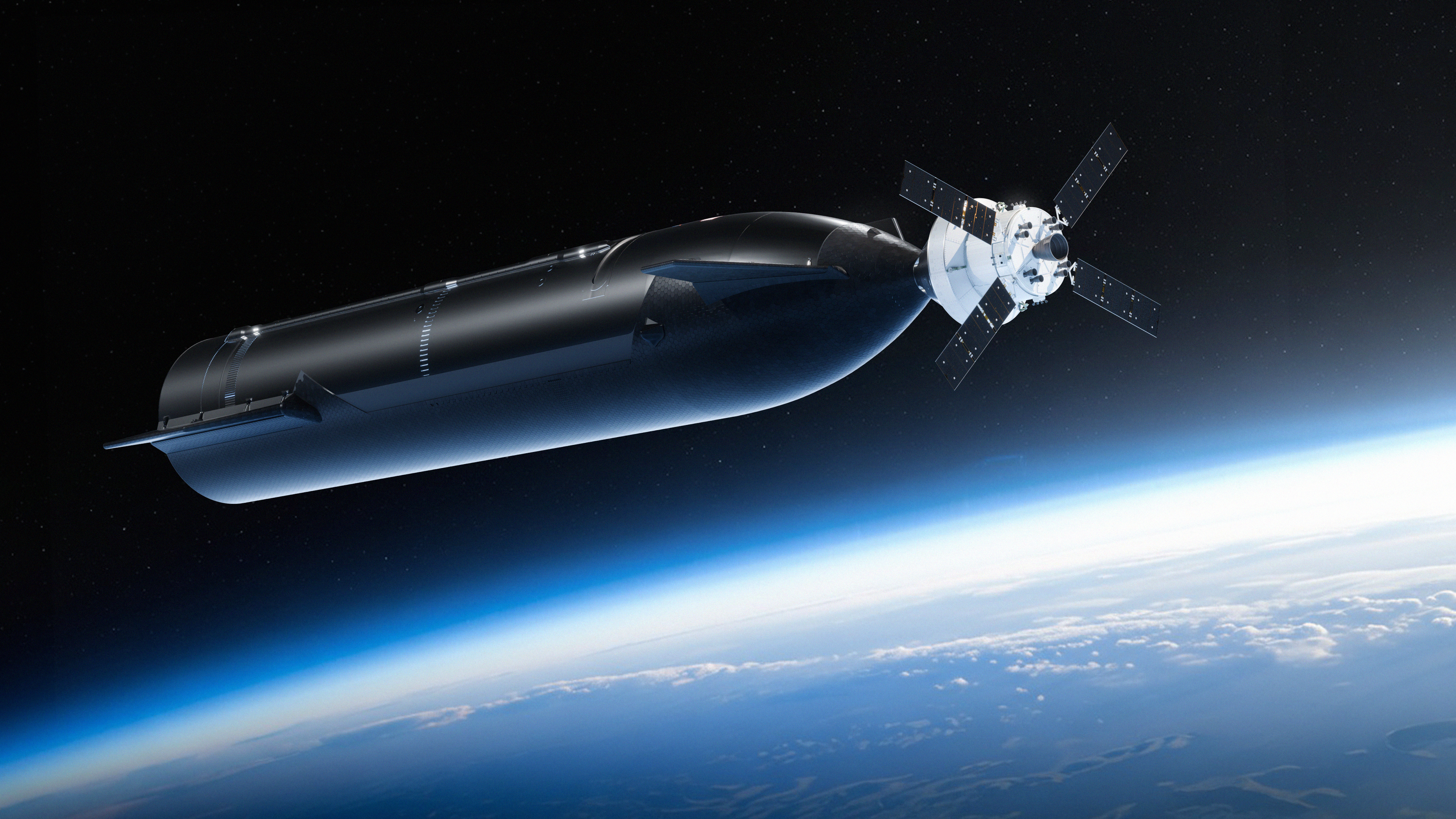
An illustration of Orion MPCV (with the ESM) docking with Starship HLS test article as a planned Artemis III activity

The SpaceX Starship is expected to be equipped with a docking mechanism, but not an operational life-support system, so the crew would remain aboard Orion rather than entering the vehicle.

As of April 2026, both spacecraft remained under development and had not yet completed NASA's human-rating certification process required before crewed operations.

== History ==
=== Early Artemis III plans ===
Artemis III was originally planned as the first crewed lunar landing mission of the Artemis program and the first crewed landing on the Moon since Apollo 17 in 1972. Under NASA's earlier plans, two astronauts would have landed near the lunar south pole while the remaining crew members stayed in lunar orbit aboard Orion.

The mission originated as Exploration Mission-3 (EM-3), which was intended to support assembly of the Lunar Gateway in lunar orbit. After the Artemis program was announced in 2019, the mission was redesignated Artemis III and repurposed as the program's first crewed lunar landing mission.

Early concepts called for Orion to rendezvous with a Human Landing System in lunar orbit, initially with support from the Gateway. By 2020, NASA had removed Gateway from the mission profile and adopted a direct rendezvous and docking approach between Orion and the lunar lander.

As part of planning for the lunar landing mission, NASA selected three science instruments for astronaut deployment on the lunar surface in 2024 and identified candidate landing regions near the lunar south pole.

On May 2, 2025, the second Trump administration's fiscal year 2026 budget proposal called for ending the Space Launch System (SLS) and Orion programs after Artemis III, citing the SLS's estimated cost of $4 billion per launch. However, the One Big Beautiful Bill Act, signed into law by President Donald Trump on July 4, 2025, provided funding for continued development and operation of SLS and Orion beyond Artemis III.

In August 2025, NASA began processing Artemis III Space Launch System hardware at the Vehicle Assembly Building at Kennedy Space Center.

=== Revision to Earth-orbit demonstration ===
On February 27, 2026, NASA announced a revised Artemis flight sequence with a redesignated Artemis III as a crewed demonstration mission in low Earth orbit. Under the revised plan, the mission would evaluate Orion systems and conduct integrated operations with commercial lunar lander providers in preparation for later lunar missions. NASA has stated that Artemis IV, planned for early 2028, is expected to become the program's first crewed lunar landing mission.

After considering a high Earth orbit (HEO) profile, planners selected an approximately 230-nautical-mile (430 km; 260 mi) low Earth orbit (LEO) mission, allowing NASA to preserve an Interim Cryogenic Propulsion Stage for use on Artemis IV. NASA determined that this benefit outweighed the advantages of a HEO mission, which would have more closely simulated the thermal and operational conditions encountered near the Moon and provided a more rigorous test of Orion's systems.

== See also ==
- Apollo 9, 1969 earth-orbit mission that also tested lunar landing hardware
- List of Artemis missions
- List of missions to the Moon
- New Space Race
