= List of spaceflight records =

Extreme benchmarks set off Earth by astronauts, launchers and probes

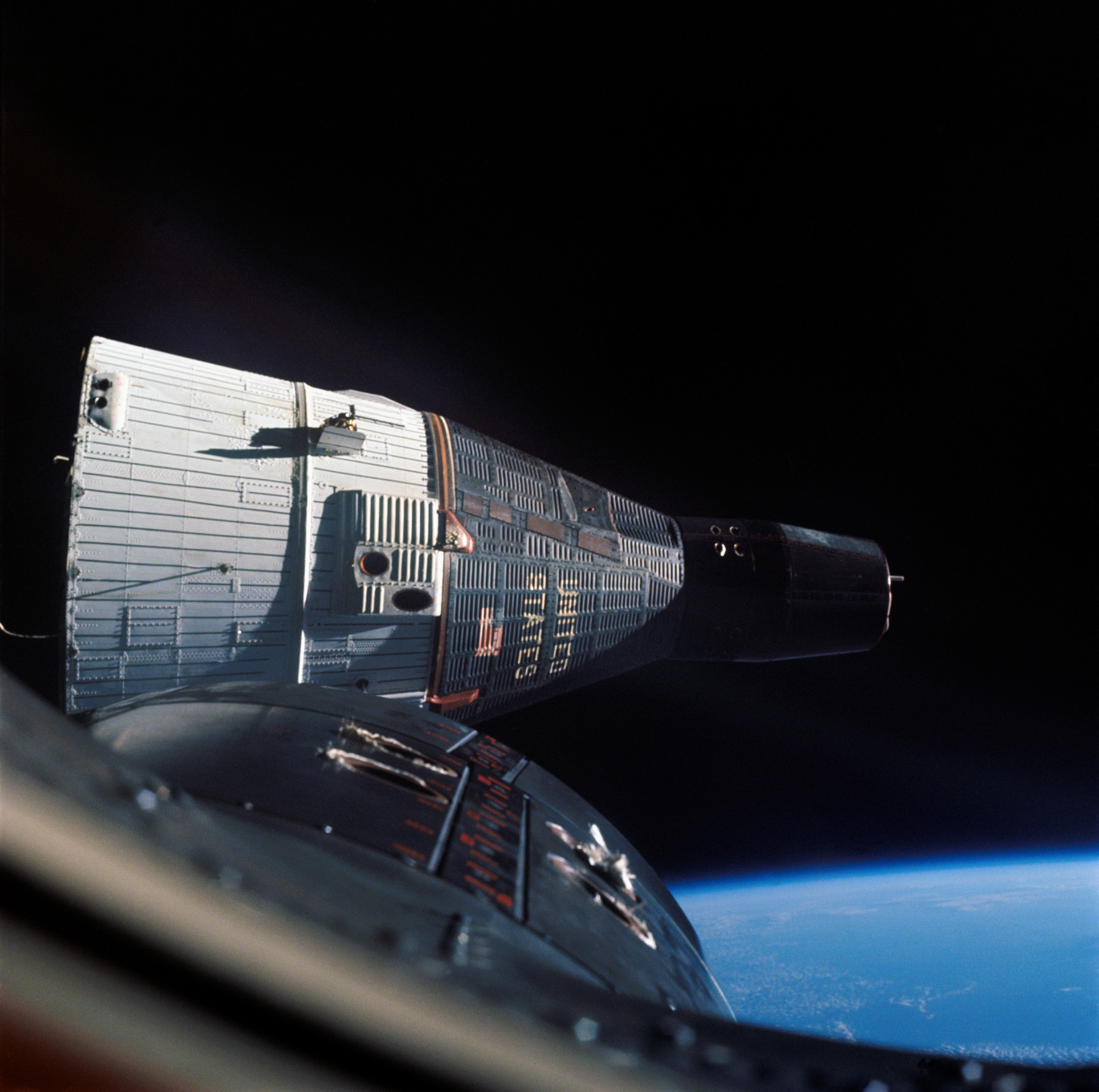
The first space rendezvous was accomplished by Gemini 6A and Gemini 7 in 1965.

Records and firsts in spaceflight are broadly divided into crewed and uncrewed categories. Records involving animal spaceflight have also been noted in earlier experimental flights, typically to establish the feasibility of sending humans to outer space.

The notion of "firsts" in spaceflight follows a long tradition of firsts in aviation, but is also closely tied to the Space Race. During the 1950s and 1960s, the Soviet Union and the United States competed to be the first countries to accomplish various feats. In 1957, the Soviet Union launched Sputnik 1, the first artificial orbital satellite. In 1961, Soviet Vostok 1 cosmonaut Yuri Gagarin became the first person to enter space and orbit the Earth, and in 1969 American Apollo 11 astronaut Neil Armstrong became the first person to set foot on the Moon.

During the 1970s, the Soviet Union directed its energies to human habitation of space stations of increasingly long durations. In the 1980s, the United States began launching its Space Shuttles, which carried larger crews and thus could increase the number of people in space at a given time. Following their first mission of détente on the 1975 Apollo-Soyuz Test Project, the Soviet Union and the United States again collaborated with each other on the Shuttle-Mir initiative, efforts which led to the International Space Station (ISS), which has been continuously inhabited by humans for over 25 years.

Other firsts in spaceflight involve demographics, private enterprise, and distance. Dozens of countries have sent at least one traveler to space. In 1963, Valentina Tereshkova became the first woman in space, aboard Vostok 6. In the early 21st century, private companies joined government agencies in crewed spaceflight: in 2004, the sub-orbital spaceplane SpaceShipOne became the first privately funded crewed craft to enter space; in 2020, SpaceX's Dragon 2 became the first privately developed crewed vehicle to reach orbit when it ferried a crew to the ISS. As of 2026, the uncrewed probe Voyager 1 is the most distant artificial object from the Earth, part of a small class of vehicles that are leaving the Solar System.

== First independent suborbital and orbital human spaceflight by country ==
Country	Mission	Crew	Spacecraft	Launch vehicle	Date	Type	Notes
(Soviet Union) USSR	Vostok 1	Yuri Gagarin	Vostok 3KA	Vostok-K	12 April 1961	Orbital	
(United States) USA	Mercury-Redstone 3 (Freedom 7)	Alan Shepard	Mercury Spacecraft No.7	Mercury-Redstone	5 May 1961	Sub-orbital	
(United States) USA	Mercury-Atlas 6 (Friendship 7)	John Glenn	Mercury Spacecraft No.13	Atlas LV-3B	20 February 1962	Orbital	
(Soviet Union) USSR	Soyuz 18A	Vasily Lazarev, Oleg Makarov	Soyuz 7K-T	Soyuz 11A511	5 April 1975	Sub-orbital	The mission was intended to be orbital, but a fault in the launch vehicle prevented the spacecraft from reaching orbit.
Russia	Soyuz TM-14	Aleksandr Viktorenko, Aleksandr Kaleri, Klaus-Dietrich Flade	Soyuz-TM	Soyuz-U2	17 March 1992	Orbital	First Soyuz mission to occur after the dissolution of the Soviet Union.
China	Shenzhou 5	Yang Liwei	Shenzhou spacecraft	Long March 2F	15 October 2003	Orbital	

== Human spaceflight firsts ==
Note: Some space records are disputed as a result of ambiguities surrounding the border of space. Most records follow the FAI definition of the space border which the FAI sets at an altitude of 100 km (62.14 mi). By contrast, US agencies define the border of space at 50 mi (80.47 km).

First	Person(s)	Mission	Country	Date
Person to reach space; Person in orbit; Person to survive orbital reentry	Yuri Gagarin	Vostok 1	(Soviet Union) USSR	12 April 1961
Person to make suborbital flight; Person to land in water (splashdown); Person to manually pilot spacecraft.	Alan Shepard	Freedom 7	(United States) USA	5 May 1961
Person in space for over 24 hours; Multiple orbits during a spaceflight	Gherman Titov	Vostok 2	(Soviet Union) USSR	6 August 1961 – 7 August 1961
Group flight; Adjacent orbits; Spacecraft-to-spacecraft communications	Andrian Nikolayev; Pavel Popovich	Vostok 3; Vostok 4	(Soviet Union) USSR	12 August 1962 – 15 August 1962
Woman in space; Civilian in space and in orbit (at the time of selection)	Valentina Tereshkova	Vostok 6	(Soviet Union) USSR	16 June 1963 – 19 June 1963
Spaceflight (suborbital) by winged spacecraft; Civilian in space (at the time of flight); Spaceflight (suborbital) of a reusable spacecraft	Joe Walker	X-15 Flight 90	(United States) USA	19 July 1963
Person to enter space twice (suborbital flights above 100 km (62 mi))	Joe Walker	X-15 Flights 90 and 91	(United States) USA	22 August 1963
Three-person spaceflight in a single spacecraft; Human spaceflight without pressurized spacesuits; Human spaceflight with the crew soft landing on hard ground inside spacecraft after orbital flight	Vladimir Komarov; Konstantin Feoktistov; Boris Yegorov	Voskhod 1	(Soviet Union) USSR	12 October 1964 – 13 October 1964
Two-person spaceflight in a single spacecraft; Multi-person spaceflight with pressurized spacesuits; Manual orientation of spacecraft for atmospheric reentry	Pavel Belyayev; Alexei Leonov	Voskhod 2	(Soviet Union) USSR	18 March 1965 – 19 March 1965
Spacewalk	Alexei Leonov	Voskhod 2	(Soviet Union) USSR	18 March 1965
Orbital maneuvers (change orbit)	Gus Grissom, John W. Young	Gemini 3	(United States) USA	23 March 1965
Person to fly two orbital spaceflights	Gordon Cooper	Faith 7; Gemini 5	(United States) USA	15 May 1963 – 16 May 1963; 21 August 1965 – 29 August 1965
Persons to spend one week in space	Gordon Cooper; Pete Conrad	Gemini 5	(United States) USA	21 August 1965 – 29 August 1965
Spaceflight aborted before liftoff (after engine start)	Walter Schirra; Thomas P. Stafford	Gemini 6A	(United States) USA	12 December 1965
Space rendezvous (orbital maneuver and station-keeping); Four people in space at the same time	Frank Borman, Jim Lovell; Walter Schirra, Thomas Stafford	Gemini 7; Gemini 6A	(United States) USA	15 December 1965 – 16 December 1965
Civilian in orbit (at the time of flight)	Neil Armstrong	Gemini 8	(United States) USA	16 March 1966 – 17 March 1966
Space docking	Neil Armstrong; David Scott	Gemini 8 and Agena	(United States) USA	16 March 1966
Multiple (dual) rendezvous (with Agena 10, then Agena 8)	John W. Young; Michael Collins	Gemini 10	(United States) USA	19 July 1966; 20 July 1966
Persons to exceed 1,000 km above Earth	Pete Conrad; Richard F. Gordon Jr.	Gemini 11	(United States) USA	12 September 1966 – 15 September 1966
Spaceflight death (during landing)	Vladimir Komarov	Soyuz 1	(Soviet Union) USSR	23 April 1967 – 24 April 1967
Person to complete three spaceflights; Person to fly three different types of spacecraft	Wally Schirra	Mercury-Atlas 8; Gemini 6A; Apollo 7	(United States) USA	22 October 1968
Persons to go beyond low Earth orbit (LEO); Persons to enter the gravitational influence of another celestial body; Persons to enter lunar orbit; Persons to see the far side of the moon with their own eyes	Frank Borman; Jim Lovell; Bill Anders	Apollo 8	(United States) USA	24 December 1968 – 25 December 1968
People to fly together twice on different missions	Frank Borman; Jim Lovell	Gemini 7; Apollo 8	(United States) USA	21 December 1968
Space docking of two crewed spacecraft; Dual spacewalk; Сrew transfer (Khrunov, Yeliseyev)	Vladimir Shatalov; Boris Volynov; Aleksei Yeliseyev; Yevgeny Khrunov	Soyuz 4; Soyuz 5	(Soviet Union) USSR	16 January 1969
Solo flight around the Moon	John Young	Apollo 10	(United States) USA	22 May 1969
Moon landing; Planetary surface extra-vehicular activity (EVA)	Neil Armstrong; Buzz Aldrin	Apollo 11	(United States) USA	20 July 1969
Five people in space at the same time	Georgy Shonin, Valery Kubasov; Anatoly Filipchenko, Vladislav Volkov, Viktor Gorbatko	Soyuz 6; Soyuz 7	(Soviet Union) USSR	12 October 1969 – 13 October 1969
Triple spaceflight; Seven people in space at the same time	Shonin, Kubasov; Filipchenko, Volkov, Gorbatko; Vladimir Shatalov, Aleksei Yeliseyev	Soyuz 6; Soyuz 7; Soyuz 8	(Soviet Union) USSR	13 October 1969 – 16 October 1969
Person to complete four spaceflights	James A. Lovell	Gemini 7; Gemini 12; Apollo 8; Apollo 13	(United States) USA	17 April 1970
Person to fly two lunar flights; Person to complete two flights beyond low Earth orbit	James A. Lovell	Apollo 8; Apollo 13	(United States) USA	11 April 1970 – 17 April 1970
Persons to fly a free-return trajectory around a celestial body; Farthest humans had traveled from Earth for over 50 years	James A. Lovell; Jack Swigert; Fred Haise	Apollo 13	(United States) USA	11 April 1970 – 17 April 1970
People to spend two weeks in space; Night launch	Andrian Nikolayev; Vitali Sevastyanov	Soyuz 9	(Soviet Union) USSR	1 June 1970 – 19 June 1970
People to EVA out of sight of their spacecraft	Alan Shepard; Edgar Mitchell	Apollo 14	(United States) USA	6 February 1971
Person to play sports on a planetary body other than Earth	Alan Shepard	Apollo 14	(United States) USA	7 February 1971
Docking with space station (soft dock); Night landing	Vladimir Shatalov; Aleksei Yeliseyev; Nikolai Rukavishnikov	Soyuz 10; Salyut 1	(Soviet Union) USSR	22 April 1971 – 24 April 1971
Docking with space station (hard dock); Crewed space station; In-space fatalities	Georgy Dobrovolsky; Viktor Patsayev; Vladislav Volkov	Soyuz 11; Salyut 1	(Soviet Union) USSR	7 June 1971 – 29 June 1971
Person to use a telescope in space	Viktor Patsayev	Soyuz 11; Salyut 1	(Soviet Union) USSR	7 June 1971 – 29 June 1971
People to travel in a wheeled vehicle on a planetary body other than Earth	Dave Scott; Jim Irwin	Apollo 15	(United States) USA	31 July 1971– 2 August 1971
Deep space EVA (trans-Earth trajectory)	Alfred Worden	Apollo 15	(United States) USA	5 August 1971
Person to be in lunar orbit twice (during separate lunar expeditions)	John W. Young	Apollo 10; Apollo 16	(United States) USA	16 April 1972 – 27 April 1972
People in orbit for four weeks	Pete Conrad; Joseph Kerwin; Paul Weitz	Skylab 2	(United States) USA	25 May 1973 – 22 June 1973
Spacewalk at a space station	Paul Weitz	Skylab 2	(United States) USA	26 May 1973
People in orbit for eight weeks	Alan Bean; Jack Lousma; Owen Garriott	Skylab 3	(United States) USA	28 July 1973 – 25 September 1973
People in orbit for 12 weeks	Gerald Carr; William Pogue; Edward Gibson	Skylab 4	(United States) USA	16 November 1973 – 8 February 1974
Spaceflight aborted during liftoff (at 145 kilometers (90 mi) altitude); Re-entry with 20g acceleration (emergency)	Vasily Lazarev, Oleg Makarov	Soyuz 7K-T No.39	(Soviet Union) USSR	5 April 1975
International docking	Thomas P. Stafford, Vance D. Brand, Donald K. Slayton – USA Alexei Leonov, Valeri Kubasov – USSR	Apollo–Soyuz	(United States) USA (Soviet Union) USSR	17 July 1975
Crew to visit occupied space station	Vladimir Dzhanibekov, Oleg Makarov	Soyuz 27 visits Salyut 6 EO-1 crew	(Soviet Union) USSR	10 January 1978 – 16 January 1978
People in orbit 19 weeks (4 months)	Vladimir Kovalyonok, Aleksandr Ivanchenkov	Salyut 6 EO-2, Soyuz 29-Soyuz 31	(Soviet Union) USSR	15 June 1978 – 2 November 1978
People in orbit 26 weeks (6 months)	Leonid Popov, Valery Ryumin	Salyut 6 EO-4, Soyuz 35-Soyuz 37	(Soviet Union) USSR	9 April 1980 – 11 October 1980
Spaceflight (orbital) by winged spacecraft; Spaceflight (orbital) of a reusable spacecraft; First, and only, crew launched on a rocket's maiden flight	John W. Young; Robert L. Crippen	STS-1	(United States) USA	12 April 1981
Person to fly four different types of spacecraft	John W. Young	Gemini; Apollo CSM; Apollo Lunar Module; Space Shuttle	(United States) USA	12 April 1981
Person to complete five spaceflights	John W. Young	Gemini 3; Gemini 10; Apollo 10; Apollo 16; STS-1	(United States) USA	14 April 1981
Re-use of previously flown spacecraft (orbital)	Joe H. Engle; Richard H. Truly	STS-2	(United States) USA	12 November 1981
Woman to visit a space station	Svetlana Savitskaya	Salyut 7, Soyuz T-7	(Soviet Union) USSR	20 August 1982
Four-person spaceflight in a single spacecraft	Vance Brand; Robert F. Overmyer; Joseph P. Allen; William B. Lenoir	STS-5	(United States) USA	11 November 1982 – 16 November 1982
Five-person spaceflight in a single spacecraft	Robert L. Crippen; Frederick H. Hauck; John M. Fabian; Sally K. Ride; Norman E. Thagard	STS-7	(United States) USA	18 June 1983 – 24 June 1983
LGBTQ person in space	Sally K. Ride	STS-7	(United States) USA	18 June 1983 – 24 June 1983
Use of a launch escape system in an emergency	Vladimir Titov, Gennady Strekalov	Soyuz 7K-ST No.16L	(Soviet Union) USSR	26 September 1983
Six-person spaceflight in a single spacecraft	John W. Young, Brewster H. Shaw, Owen K. Garriott, Robert A. Parker, Byron K. Lichtenberg – USA; Ulf Merbold – West Germany (European Space Agency)	STS-9	(United States) USA; West Germany	28 November 1983 – 8 December 1983
Person to complete six spaceflights	John W. Young	Gemini 3; Gemini 10; Apollo 10; Apollo 16; STS-1; STS-9	(United States) USA	8 December 1983
Untethered spacewalk	Bruce McCandless II	STS-41-B	(United States) USA	7 February 1984
Eight people in space at the same time (no docking)	Oleg Atkov, Leonid Kizim, Vladimir Solovyov – USSR; Vance D. Brand, Robert L. Gibson, Bruce McCandless II, Ronald McNair, Robert L. Stewart – USA	Salyut 7 EO-3, Soyuz T-10, STS-41-B	(Soviet Union) USSR; (United States) USA	8 February 1984 – 11 February 1984
11 people in space at the same time (no docking)	Oleg Atkov, Leonid D. Kizim, Yury Malyshev, Vladimir Solovyov, Gennady Strekalov – USSR; Robert L. Crippen, Terry J. Hart, George Nelson, Francis Scobee, James van Hoften – USA; Rakesh Sharma – India	STS-41-C, Salyut 7 EO-3, Soyuz T-10-Soyuz T-11	(Soviet Union) USSR; (United States) USA; India	6 April 1984 – 11 April 1984
People to complete four spacewalks during the same mission	Leonid Kizim, Vladimir Solovyov	Salyut 7	(Soviet Union) USSR	26 April – 18 May 1984
Woman to enter space twice	Svetlana Savitskaya	Soyuz T-7, Soyuz T-12	(Soviet Union) USSR	17 July 1984
Spacewalk by a woman	Svetlana Savitskaya	Soyuz T-12	(Soviet Union) USSR	25 July 1984
Welding in space	Vladimir Dzhanibekov, Svetlana Savitskaya	Salyut 7, Soyuz T-12	(Soviet Union) USSR	25 July 1984
People in orbit 33 weeks (7 months)	Leonid Kizim, Vladimir Solovyov, Oleg Atkov	Salyut 7 EO-3, Soyuz T-10-Soyuz T-11	(Soviet Union) USSR	8 February 1984 – 2 October 1984
Seven-person spaceflight in a single spacecraft	Robert L. Crippen, Jon A. McBride, Kathryn D. Sullivan, Sally K. Ride, David C. Leestma, Paul D. Scully-Power – USA; Marc Garneau – Canada	STS-41-G	(United States) USA; Canada	5 October 1984 – 13 October 1984
Two women in space at the same time	Kathryn D. Sullivan, Sally K. Ride	STS-41-G	(United States) USA	5 October 1984 – 13 October 1984
Member of royalty in space	Sultan bin Salman Al Saud – House of Saud	STS-51-G	Saudi Arabia (United States) USA	17 June 1985 – 24 June 1985
Partial crew exchange at a space station	Alexander Volkov, Vladimir Vasyutin replace Vladimir Dzhanibekov	Soyuz T-14, Salyut 7	(Soviet Union) USSR	17 September 1985 – 26 September 1985
Eight-person spaceflight in a single spacecraft	Henry W. Hartsfield, Steven R. Nagel, Bonnie J. Dunbar, James F. Buchli, Guion S. Bluford – USA; Reinhard Furrer, Ernst Messerschmid – West Germany; Wubbo Ockels – Netherlands (European Space Agency)	STS-61-A	(United States) USA; (West Germany) West Germany; Netherlands	30 October 1985 – 6 November 1985
Deaths during launch	Francis "Dick" Scobee; Michael J. Smith; Ellison Onizuka; Judith Resnik; Ronald McNair; Sharon Christa McAuliffe; Gregory Jarvis	STS-51-L	(United States) USA	28 January 1986
Space station-to-space station flight; Space station-to-space station return flight; Expedition on two space stations	Leonid Kizim; Vladimir Solovyov	Soyuz T-15 from Mir to Salyut 7 back to Mir	(Soviet Union) USSR	15 March 1986 – 16 July 1986
Person to accumulate 1 year in space	Leonid Kizim	Soyuz T-3 Soyuz T-15 visiting Mir and Salyut 7	(Soviet Union) USSR	28 June 1986
Complete crew exchange at a space station	Vladimir Titov, Musa Manarov replace Yuri Romanenko, Alexander Alexandrov	Soyuz TM-4-Soyuz TM-2, Soyuz TM-3, at Mir	(Soviet Union) USSR	21 December 1987 – 29 December 1987
People in orbit 52 weeks (one year)	Vladimir Titov, Musa Manarov	Mir EO-3, Soyuz TM-4-Soyuz TM-6	(Soviet Union) USSR	21 December 1987 – 21 December 1988
International spacewalk	Alexander Volkov, Jean-Loup Chrétien	Mir, Soyuz TM-7	(Soviet Union) USSR; France	9 December 1988
Submariner in space	Michael J. McCulley	STS-34	(United States) USA	18 October 1989 – 23 October 1989
12 people in space at the same time (no docking)	Shuttle: Vance Brand, Samuel Durrance, Guy S. Gardner, Jeffrey A. Hoffman, John M. Lounge, Ronald Parise, Robert A. Parker – USA; Mir: Gennady Manakov, Gennady Strekalov – Russia; Soyuz and Soyuz/Mir: Musa Manarov, Viktor Afanasyev – Russia; Toyohiro Akiyama – Japan	STS-35, Mir EO-7, Soyuz TM-10 Soyuz TM-11	(Soviet Union) USSR; (United States) USA; Japan	2 December 1990 – 10 December 1990
Civilian to use a commercial space flight, and journalist to report on space from outer space	Toyohiro Akiyama – Japan	Soyuz TM-10, Soyuz TM-11	Japan	2 December 1990 – 10 December 1990
Three women in space at the same time	Millie Hughes-Fulford, Tamara E. Jernigan, M. Rhea Seddon	STS-40	(United States) USA	5 June 1991 – 14 June 1991
Three-person spacewalk	Pierre J. Thuot; Richard J. Hieb; Thomas D. Akers	STS-49	(United States) USA	13 May 1992
Married couple in space	Mark C. Lee, Jan Davis	STS-47	(United States) USA	12 September 1992 – 20 September 1992
13 people in space at the same time (no docking)	Shuttle: Steve Oswald, William Gregory, John Grunsfeld, Wendy Lawrence, Tammy Jernigan, Sam Durrance, Ron Parise – USA; Mir: Aleksandr Viktorenko, Yelena Kondakova, Valeriy Polyakov – Russia; Soyuz/Mir: Vladimir Dezhurov, Gennady Strekalov – Russia; Norman E. Thagard – USA	STS-67, Mir, Soyuz TM-20, Soyuz TM-21	(United States) USA; Russia	14 March 1995 – 18 March 1995
Ten people in a single spacecraft (docking)	Robert L. Gibson, Charles J. Precourt, Ellen S. Baker, Bonnie J. Dunbar, Gregory J. Harbaugh Norman E. Thagard – USA; Anatoly Solovyev, Nikolai Budarin, Vladimir Dezhurov, Gennady Strekalov – Russia	STS-71, Mir, Soyuz TM-21	(United States) USA; Russia	29 June 1995 – 4 July 1995
Spacewalk during an international docking	Michael R. Clifford, Linda M. Godwin	STS-76, Mir	(United States) USA	27 March 1996
Person to accumulate 2 years in space	Sergey Avdeev	Soyuz TM-15 (Mir EO-12) Soyuz TM-22 (Mir EO-20) Soyuz TM-28/Soyuz TM-29 Mir EO 27	Russia	10 July 1999
Woman to command a space mission	Eileen Collins	STS-93	(United States) USA	23 July 1999 – 27 July 1999
Space tourist	Dennis Tito	Soyuz TM-32/31, ISS EP-1	(United States) USA; Russia	April 28, 2001 – May 6, 2001
Person to complete seven trips to space	Jerry L. Ross	STS-61B; STS-27; STS-37; STS-55; STS-74; STS-88; STS-110	(United States) USA	19 April 2002
Deaths during re-entry	Rick D. Husband, William C. McCool, David M. Brown, Kalpana Chawla, Michael P. Anderson, Laurel B. Clark – USA; Ilan Ramon – Israel	STS-107	(United States) USA; Israel	1 February 2003
Privately funded human space flight (suborbital)	Mike Melvill	SpaceShipOne flight 15P	(United States) USA	21 June 2004
13 people in a single spacecraft (docking)	Michael Barratt, Mark L. Polansky, Douglas G. Hurley, Christopher J. Cassidy, Thomas H. Marshburn, David Wolf, Timothy Kopra – USA; Gennady Padalka, Roman Romanenko – Russia; Robert Thirsk, Julie Payette – Canada; Frank De Winne – Belgium (European Space Agency); Koichi Wakata – Japan	ISS, Soyuz TMA-14, Soyuz TMA-15, STS-127	(United States) USA; Russia; Canada; Belgium; Japan	17 July 2009
People to fly together three times on different missions	Frederick W. "CJ" Sturckow; Patrick G. Forrester	STS-105; STS-117; STS-128	(United States) USA	28 August 2009
Four women in space at the same time (docking)	Shuttle: Dorothy Metcalf-Lindenburger, Stephanie Wilson – USA; Naoko Yamazaki – Japan; ISS: Tracy Caldwell Dyson – USA	STS-131; ISS Expedition 23	(United States) USA; Japan	5 April 2010 – 20 April 2010
Thirty-ninth launch, orbital flight, and landing of a reusable crewed spacecraft	Steven W. Lindsey; Eric A. Boe; Nicole M. P. Stott; Alvin Drew; Michael R. Barratt; Stephen G. Bowen	Space Shuttle Discovery; STS-133	(United States) USA	24 February 2011 – 9 March 2011
Private spaceflight death; Person to survive an in-flight spacecraft destruction	Michael Alsbury Peter Siebold	VSS Enterprise PF04	(United States) USA	31 October 2014
Six spacecraft docked to a space station	ISS: Expedition 56	Dragon-15, Cygnus-9, Soyuz MS-08, Soyuz MS-09, Progress MS-08, Progress MS-09	(United States) USA; Russia	9 July 2018
All-woman spacewalk; Spacewalk by two women	Christina Koch; Jessica Meir	ISS Expedition 61	(United States) USA	18 October 2019
Astronauts launched into orbit on commercial spacecraft; Astronauts flying to a space station on commercial spacecraft	Bob Behnken; Doug Hurley	Crew Dragon Demo-2	(United States) USA	30 May 2020 – 2 August 2020
16 people in space (50 miles) at the same time (no docking)	ISS: Mark Vande Hei, Shane Kimbrough, K. Megan McArthur, – USA; Oleg Novitsky, Pyotr Dubrov – Russia; Thomas Pesquet – France; Akihiko Hoshide – Japan; CSS: Nie Haisheng, Liu Boming, Tang Hongbo, – China; Unity: David Mackay, Michael Masucci, Beth Moses, Sirisha Bandla - USA; Richard Branson, Colin Bennett – United Kingdom	Soyuz MS-18, SpaceX Crew-2, Shenzhou-12, Virgin Galactic Unity-22	(United States) USA; China; Russia; France; Japan; (United Kingdom) UK	11 July 2021
14 people in space (100 km) at the same time (no docking)	ISS: Mark Vande Hei, Shane Kimbrough, K. Megan McArthur, – USA; Oleg Novitsky, Pyotr Dubrov – Russia; Thomas Pesquet – France; Akihiko Hoshide – Japan; CSS: Nie Haisheng, Liu Boming, Tang Hongbo, – China; New Shepard: Jeff Bezos, Mark Bezos, Wally Funk – USA; Oliver Daemen – Netherlands	Soyuz MS-18, SpaceX Crew-2, Shenzhou-12, Blue Origin NS-16	(United States) USA; China; Russia; France; Japan; Netherlands	20 July 2021
Orbital spaceflight with an all private crew; Fully commercial orbital spaceflight	Jared Isaacman; Hayley Arceneaux; Christopher Sembroski; Sian Proctor	Inspiration4	(United States) USA	16 September 2021 – 18 September 2021
Woman commercial astronaut spaceship pilot; Black woman spaceship pilot	Sian Proctor	Inspiration4	(United States) USA	16 September 2021 – 18 September 2021
Person with physical disability in space; Wearing of prosthetics in space	Hayley Arceneaux	Inspiration4	(United States) USA	16 September 2021 – 18 September 2021
14 people in orbit at the same time (no docking)	ISS: Mark Vande Hei, Shane Kimbrough, K. Megan McArthur, – USA; Oleg Novitsky, Pyotr Dubrov – Russia; Thomas Pesquet – France; Akihiko Hoshide – Japan; CSS: Nie Haisheng, Liu Boming, Tang Hongbo, – China; Inspiration4: Jared Isaacman, Hayley Arceneaux, Sian Proctor, Christopher Sembroski – USA	Soyuz MS-18, SpaceX Crew-2, Shenzhou-12, Inspiration4	(United States) USA; China; Russia; France; Japan	16 September 2021 – 17 September 2021
19 people in space (100 km) at the same time (no docking)	ISS: Mark Vande Hei, Raja Chari, Thomas Marshburn, Kayla Barron – USA; Anton Shkaplerov, Pyotr Dubrov, Alexander Misurkin – Russia; Matthias Maurer – Germany; Yusaku Maezawa, Yozo Hirano – Japan; CSS: Zhai Zhigang, Wang Yaping, Ye Guangfu, – China; New Shepard: Laura Shepard Churchley, Michael Strahan, Dylan Taylor, Evan Dick, Lane Bess, Cameron Bess – USA	Soyuz MS-19, Shenzhou-13, SpaceX Crew-3, Soyuz MS-20, Blue Origin NS-19	(United States) USA; China; Russia; Germany; Japan	11 December 2021
Flight to a space station with an all private crew; Fully commercial flight to a space station	Michael López-Alegría; Larry Connor; Mark Pathy; Eytan Stibbe	Axiom Mission 1 to ISS	(United States) USA; Spain; Canada; Israel	8 April 2022 – 18 April 2022
Simultaneous continuous inhabitation of two crewed space stations	ISS: Soyuz, Crew Dragon and Starliner (Note: Crew replenished by direct or indirect handovers.); CSS: Shenzhou (Note: Crew replenished by direct handovers.)	ISS; CSS	Canada; (Europe) European Space Agency; Japan; (United States) USA; Russia; China	5 June 2022 – present
5 women in space at the same time (no docking)	ISS: Jessica Watkins, Nicole Mann – USA; Anna Kikina – Russia; Samantha Cristoforetti – Italy; Tiangong : Liu Yang – China	SpaceX Crew-4, SpaceX Crew-5, Shenzhou-14	(United States) USA; Russia; Italy; China	5 October 2022 – 14 October 2022
20 people in space (50 miles) at the same time (no docking)	ISS: Stephen Bowen, Warren Hoburg, Peggy Whitson, John Shoffner, Francisco Rubio – USA Andrey Fedyaev, Dmitry Petelin, Sergey Prokopyev – Russia Ali AlQarni, Rayyanah Barnawi – Saudi Arabia Sultan Al Neyadi – UAE; CSS: Fei Junlong, Deng Qingming, Zhang Lu – China; Unity 25: Michael Masucci, Frederick W. "CJ" Sturckow, Beth Moses, Luke Mays, Jamila Gilbert, Christopher Huie – USA	Axiom Mission 2, Soyuz MS-23, SpaceX Crew-6, Shenzhou 15, Virgin Galactic Unity 25	(United States) USA; Russia; China; Saudi Arabia; (United Arab Emirates) UAE	25 May 2023
17 people in orbit at the same time (no docking)	ISS: Stephen Bowen, Warren Hoburg, Peggy Whitson, John Shoffner, Francisco Rubio – USA Andrey Fedyaev, Dmitry Petelin, Sergey Prokopyev – Russia Ali AlQarni, Rayyanah Barnawi – Saudi Arabia Sultan Al Neyadi – UAE; CSS: Fei Junlong, Deng Qingming, Zhang Lu, Jing Haipeng, Zhu Yangzhu, Gui Haichao – China	Axiom Mission 2, Soyuz MS-23, SpaceX Crew-6, Shenzhou 15, Shenzhou 16	(United States) USA; Russia; China; Saudi Arabia; (United Arab Emirates) UAE	30 May 2023 – 31 May 2023
Seven spacecraft docked to a space station	ISS: Expedition 70/Expedition 71	Dragon-30, Cygnus 21, Soyuz MS-24, Soyuz MS-25, Progress MS-25, Progress MS-26, SpaceX Crew-8	(United States) USA; Russia	25 March 2024
Person to accumulate 1000 days in space	Oleg Kononenko	Expedition 71	Russia	5 June 2024
Woman to fly on the maiden crewed flight of an orbital spacecraft	Sunita Williams	Boeing CFT	(United States) USA	5 June 2024
Person to accumulate 3 years in space	Oleg Kononenko	Soyuz TMA-12 (Expedition 17) Soyuz TMA-03M (Expedition 30/31) Soyuz TMA-17M (Expedition 44/45) Soyuz MS-11 (Expedition 57/58/59) Soyuz MS-24/MS-25 (Expedition 69/70/71)	Russia	9 September 2024
19 people in orbit at the same time (no docking)	ISS: Tracy Caldwell-Dyson, Jeanette Epps, Sunita Williams, Barry E. Wilmore, Donald Pettit, Michael Barratt, Matthew Dominick – USA Alexander Grebenkin, Ivan Vagner, Nikolai Chub, Oleg Kononenko, Aleksey Ovchinin – Russia; Polaris Dawn: Jared Isaacman, Scott Poteet, Sarah Gillis, Anna Menon – USA; CSS: Ye Guangfu, Li Cong, Li Guangsu – China	Polaris Dawn, Soyuz MS-25, Soyuz MS-26, SpaceX Crew-8, Shenzhou 18	(United States) USA; Russia; China	11 September 2024 – 15 September 2024
All private crew spacewalk; Spacewalk with commercially developed hardware, procedures, and EVA suit; Four people in the vacuum of space during a spacewalk	Jared Isaacman; Scott Poteet; Sarah Gillis; Anna Menon	Polaris Dawn	(United States) USA	12 September 2024
First humans to polar retrograde orbit, i.e., to fly over Earth's North and South poles	Chun Wang; Jannicke Mikkelsen; Rabea Rogge; Eric Philips	Fram2	Australia; GER; Norway / UK (Note: Mikkelsen was born in the United Kingdom, but is now a citizen of Norway. She will wear the flag of Norway on her spacesuit during the spaceflight.); Malta / Saint Kitts and Nevis (Note: Wang was born in China but lives primarily in Svalbard and since 2023 is also a citizen of Malta and Saint Kitts and Nevis through their golden visa programs. He will wear the flag of Malta on his spacesuit during the spaceflight.)	1 April 2025
9 women in space at the same time (no docking)	ISS: Anne McClain, Nichole Ayers – USA; CSS: Wang Haoze – China; Blue Origin NS-31: Lauren Sánchez, Amanda Nguyen, Gayle King, Katy Perry, Kerianne Flynn – USA Aisha Bowe – USA/Bahamas	SpaceX Crew-10, Shenzhou 19, Blue Origin NS-31	(United States) USA; China (The Bahamas) Bahamas	14 April 2025
20 people in space (100 km) at the same time (no docking)	ISS: Anne McClain, Nichole Ayers, Jonny Kim, Peggy Whitson – USA; Kirill Peskov, Sergey Ryzhikov, Alexey Zubritsky – Russia; Takuya Onishi – Japan; Shubhanshu Shukla – India; Sławosz Uznański-Wiśniewski – Poland; Tibor Kapu – Hungary; CSS: Chen Dong, Chen Zhongrui, Wang Jie, – China; New Shepard: Allie Kuehner, Carl Kuehner, Leland Larson, Freddie Rescigno, Owolabi Salis, James Sitkin – USA	SpaceX Crew-10, Soyuz MS-27, Shenzhou 20, Axiom Mission 4, Blue Origin NS-33	(United States) USA; China; Russia; Japan; India; Poland; Hungary	29 June 2025
Eight spacecraft docked to a space station	ISS: Expedition 73/Expedition 74	Dragon-33, Cygnus 24, Soyuz MS-27, Soyuz MS-28, Progress MS-31, Progress MS-32, SpaceX Crew-11, HTV-X1	(United States) USA; Russia; Japan	1 December 2025
First wheelchair user in space	Michaela Benthaus	Blue Origin NS-37	Germany	20 December 2025
Four people beyond low Earth orbit at the same time; First Black man beyond low Earth orbit (Glover); First woman beyond low Earth orbit (Koch); First Canadian and non-American astronaut beyond low Earth orbit (Hansen); First time humans are in Earth orbit and deep space at the same time; Farthest humans have traveled from Earth	Victor Glover, Christina Koch, Reid Wiseman, Jeremy Hansen	Artemis II	(United States) USA; Canada	1 April 2026 – 11 April 2026

== Most spaceflights ==
=== Most launches from Earth ===
- 10 launches
  - Frederick W. Sturckow (USA), Space Shuttle and SpaceShipTwo (1998–2024)

Note: The six SpaceShipTwo flights surpass the U.S. definition of spaceflight (50 mi (80.47 km)), but fall short of the Kármán line (100 km (62.14 mi)), the definition used for FAI space recordkeeping.

=== Most orbital launches overall ===
- 7 launches
  - John W. Young (USA) launched from Earth 6 times (two Titan II Gemini, two Saturn V Apollo CSM, two Space Shuttle) and from the Moon once (Apollo Lunar Module Ascent Stage) (1965–1983)
  - Jerry L. Ross (USA), Space Shuttle (1985–2002)
  - Franklin Chang Díaz (Costa Rica/USA*), Space Shuttle (1986–2002)

=== Most orbital launches from Earth ===
- 7 launches
  - Jerry L. Ross (USA), Space Shuttle (1985–2002)
  - Franklin Chang Díaz (Costa Rica/USA), Space Shuttle (1986–2002)

=== Largest number of different launch vehicles (overall) ===
- 4 launch vehicles
  - John W. Young (USA) – launched from Earth aboard a Gemini, Apollo, and Space Shuttle, and launched from the Moon aboard the Apollo Lunar Module Ascent Stage

=== Largest number of different spacecraft at launch (from Earth only) ===
- 3 spacecraft
  - Walter Schirra (USA) – launched aboard a Mercury, Gemini, and Apollo (1962–1968)
  - John W. Young (USA) – launched aboard a Gemini, Apollo, and Space Shuttle (1965–1983)
  - Soichi Noguchi (Japan) – launched aboard a Space Shuttle, Soyuz, and SpaceX Crew Dragon (2005–2020)
  - Shane Kimbrough (USA) – launched aboard a Space Shuttle, Soyuz, and SpaceX Crew Dragon (2008–2021)
  - Akihiko Hoshide (Japan) – launched aboard a Space Shuttle, Soyuz, and SpaceX Crew Dragon (2008–2021)
  - Thomas Marshburn (USA) – launched aboard a Space Shuttle, Soyuz, and SpaceX Crew Dragon (2009–2021)
  - Koichi Wakata (Japan) – launched aboard a Space Shuttle, Soyuz, and SpaceX Crew Dragon (1996–2022)
  - Peggy Whitson (USA) – launched aboard a Space Shuttle, Soyuz, and SpaceX Crew Dragon (2002–2025)
  - Michael López-Alegría (USA) – launched aboard a Space Shuttle, Soyuz, and SpaceX Crew Dragon (1995–2024)
  - Michael Barratt (USA) – launched aboard a Soyuz, Space Shuttle, and SpaceX Crew Dragon (2009–2024)
  - Barry Wilmore (USA) – launched aboard a Space Shuttle, Soyuz, and Boeing Starliner (2009–2024) (landed in a SpaceX Crew Dragon in 2025)
  - Sunita Williams (USA) – launched aboard a Space Shuttle, Soyuz, and Boeing Starliner (2006–2024) (landed in a SpaceX Crew Dragon in 2025)
  - Michael Fincke (USA) – launched aboard a Soyuz, Space Shuttle, and SpaceX Crew Dragon (2004–2025)

=== Largest number of different launch sites ===
- 3 sites – Any orbital launch
  - Neil Armstrong (USA) – Cape Kennedy Air Force Station (aboard a Gemini capsule in 1966), Kennedy Space Center (aboard an Apollo capsule in 1969), Tranquility Base (from the Moon aboard an Apollo Lunar Module, in 1969).
  - Buzz Aldrin (USA) – Cape Kennedy Air Force Station (aboard a Gemini capsule in 1966), Kennedy Space Center (aboard an Apollo capsule in 1969), Tranquility Base (from the Moon aboard an Apollo Lunar Module, in 1969).
  - Pete Conrad (USA) – Cape Kennedy Air Force Station (twice aboard a Gemini capsule 1965–1966), Kennedy Space Center (twice aboard an Apollo capsule 1969–1973), Ocean of Storms (from the Moon aboard an Apollo Lunar Module, in 1969).
  - Alan Shepard (USA) – Cape Kennedy Air Force Station (aboard a Mercury capsule in 1961), Kennedy Space Center (aboard an Apollo capsule in 1971), Fra Mauro (from the Moon aboard an Apollo Lunar Module, in 1971).
  - David Scott (USA) – Cape Kennedy Air Force Station (aboard a Gemini capsule in 1966), Kennedy Space Center (twice aboard an Apollo capsule 1969–1971), Hadley Rille (from the Moon aboard an Apollo Lunar Module, in 1971).
  - John Young (USA) – Cape Kennedy Air Force Station (now Cape Canaveral Space Force Station, twice aboard a Gemini capsule 1965–1966), Kennedy Space Center (four times, twice aboard an Apollo capsule 1969–1971, twice aboard a Space Shuttle 1981–1983), Descartes Highlands (from the Moon aboard an Apollo Lunar Module, in 1972).
  - Gene Cernan (USA) – Cape Kennedy Air Force Station (aboard a Gemini capsule in 1966), Kennedy Space Center (twice aboard an Apollo capsule 1969–1972), Taurus–Littrow (from the Moon aboard an Apollo Lunar Module, in 1972).
- 3 sites – Only orbital launches from Earth
  - Sunita Williams (USA) – Kennedy Space Center (aboard a Space Shuttle in 2006), Baikonur Cosmodrome (aboard a Soyuz capsule in 2012), Cape Canaveral Space Force Station (aboard a Starliner capsule in 2024).
  - Barry E. Wilmore (USA) – Kennedy Space Center (aboard a Space Shuttle in 2009), Baikonur Cosmodrome (aboard a Soyuz capsule in 2014), Cape Canaveral Space Force Station (aboard a Starliner capsule in 2024).
- 3 sites
  - Frederick W. Sturckow (USA) – Kennedy Space Center (four times aboard a Space Shuttle 1998–2010), Mojave Air and Space Port (aboard a Virgin Galactic SpaceShipTwo in 2018), and Spaceport America (also aboard a SpaceShipTwo, five times 2021–2024).

Notes:

- Seven of the twelve Apollo program moonwalkers launched from what was then called Cape Kennedy Air Force Station as part of the Mercury or Gemini programs. On their respective Lunar Landing Mission those seven launched twice. All Apollo Lunar Landing missions that landed on the moon launched from the Kennedy Space Center and when the lunar surface portion of their mission was complete, launched from the surface of the moon to meet up with the Apollo Command Module in lunar orbit.
- SpaceShipTwo flights are suborbital. SpaceShipTwo flights surpass the U.S. definition of spaceflight (50 mi (80.47 km)), but fall short of the Kármán line (100 km (62.14 mi)), the FAI definition used for most space recordkeeping.

== Duration records ==
=== Total human spaceflight time by country ===
Total Human Spaceflight statistics by nation
Nation	Total persons	Total person flights	Total in orbit (@ update)^{*}	Total person days^{*}^{+}	% of Total person days
TOTAL	645	1416	14	76252.28	-
Russia; Soviet Union	141	305	3	34522.17	
United States	372	914	3	28829.21	
China	28	44	3	5324.07	
ESA	45	74	1	4103.47	
Japan	14	28	0	2416.31	
Italy	8	15	-	1158.81	
Germany	13	18	-	1036.43	
France	11	20	1	879.66	
Canada	12	20	0	730.86	
Netherlands	2	3	-	210.69	
Denmark	1	2	-	208.94	
Belgium	2	3	-	207.65	
United Arab Emirates	2	2	-	193.82	
United Kingdom	2	2	-	193.81	
Sweden	2	3	-	48.39	
Switzerland	1	4	-	42.50	
Israel	2	2	-	33.01	
Poland	2	2	-	28.04	
India	2	2	-	28.03	
Hungary	2	2	-	27.99	
Saudi Arabia	3	3	-	25.52	
Turkey	1	1	-	21.65	
Spain	1	2	-	18.78	
Ukraine	1	1	-	15.69	
Belarus	1	1	-	13.78	
Bulgaria	2	2	-	11.80	
Malaysia	1	1	-	10.88	
South Korea	1	1	-	10.88	
South Africa	1	1	-	9.89	
Brazil	1	1	-	9.89	
Kazakhstan	1	1	-	9.84	
Afghanistan	1	1	-	8.85	
Syria	1	1	-	7.96	
Czechoslovakia	1	1	-	7.93	
Austria	1	1	-	7.93	
Slovakia	1	1	-	7.91	
Cuba	1	1	-	7.86	
Mongolia	1	1	-	7.86	
Vietnam	1	1	-	7.86	
Romania	1	1	-	7.86	
Mexico	1	1	-	6.88	
Malta	1	1	-	3.61	
Australia	1	1	-	3.61	
Norway	1	1	-	3.61	
Astronauts currently in space: (France) Sophie Adenot (Russia) Andrey Fedyaev (China) Zhu Yangzhu (United States) Jack Hathaway (China) Zhang Zhiyuan (Russia) Sergey Kud-Sverchkov (China) Lai Ka-ying (United States) Jessica Meir (Russia) Sergei Mikayev (United States) Christopher Williams
Data on days in space accurate as of 2026-04-12. Astronauts in space right now accurate as of 2026-04-15.
* includes those in orbit at time table was updated +TOTAL person days in orbit will not match the sum of the totals for individual nations as some individuals are dual citizens (based solely on those identified as such by spacefacts.de - see table references).

=== Most time in space ===
The record for most time in space is held by Russian cosmonaut Oleg Kononenko, who has spent 1,111 days in space over five missions. He broke the record of Gennady Padalka on 4 February 2024 at 07:30:08 UTC during his fifth spaceflight aboard Soyuz MS-24/25 for a one year long-duration mission on the ISS. He later became the first person to stay 900, 1,000, and 1,100 days in space on 25 February 2024, 4 June 2024, and 12 September 2024 respectively. Gennady Padalka is currently second, having spent 878 days in space. He himself had broken the all-time duration record on 28 June 2015 when he surpassed the previous record holder, cosmonaut Sergei Krikalev, who spent 803 days, 9 hours and 39 minutes (about 2.2 years) during six spaceflights on Soyuz, the Space Shuttle, Mir, and the International Space Station.

As of 15 November 2026, the 50 space travelers with the most total time in space are:

Color key:

- Currently in space
- Active
- Retired
- Deceased

Rank	Person	Days	Flights	Status	Nationality
1	Oleg Kononenko	1,110.623	5	Active	Russia
2	Gennady Padalka	878.478	5	Retired	Russia
3	Yuri Malenchenko	827.389	6	Retired	Russia
4	Sergei Krikalev	803.371	6	Retired	Soviet Union / Russia
5	Aleksandr Kaleri	769.276	5	Retired	Russia
6	Sergei Avdeev	747.593	3	Retired	Soviet Union / Russia
7	Anton Shkaplerov	709.336	4	Retired	Russia
8	Peggy Whitson	695.284	5	Active	United States
9	Valeri Polyakov	678.690	2	Deceased	Soviet Union / Russia
10	Fyodor Yurchikhin	672.860	5	Retired	Russia
11	Anatoly Solovyev	651.117	5	Retired	Soviet Union / Russia
12	Sunita Williams	608.014	3	Retired	United States
13	Sergey Ryzhikov	603.071	3	Active	Russia
14	Aleksey Ovchinin	595.185	3	Active	Russia
15	Donald Pettit	590.068	4	Active	United States
16	Sergey Prokopyev	567.633	2	Active	Russia
17	Oleg Artemyev	560.754	3	Retired	Russia
18	Viktor Afanasyev	555.772	4	Retired	Soviet Union / Russia
19	Yury Usachov	552.934	4	Retired	Russia
20	Michael Fincke	548.339	4	Retired	United States
21	Sergey Volkov	547.931	3	Retired	Russia
22	Pavel Vinogradov	546.939	3	Retired	Russia
23	Aleksandr Skvortsov	545.964	3	Retired	Russia
24	Oleg Novitsky	545.069	4	Retired	Russia
25	Musa Manarov	541.021	2	Retired	Soviet Union
26	Oleg Skripochka	536.159	3	Retired	Russia
27	Jeffrey Williams	534.116	4	Retired	United States
28	Mikhail Tyurin	532.118	3	Retired	Russia
29	Oleg Kotov	526.211	3	Retired	Russia
30	Mark T. Vande Hei	523.374	2	Active	United States
31	Scott Kelly	520.440	4	Retired	United States
32	Mikhail Kornienko	516.417	2	Retired	Russia
33	Koichi Wakata	504.773	5	Active	Japan
34	Aleksandr Viktorenko	489.066	4	Deceased	Soviet Union / Russia
35	Pyotr Dubrov	479.501	2	Active	Russia
36	Anatoli Ivanishin	476.195	3	Retired	Russia
37	Barry E. Wilmore	464.335	3	Retired	United States
38	Michael Barratt	446.640	3	Active	United States
39	Nikolai Budarin	444.060	3	Retired	Russia
40	Jessica Meir	441.858	2	Active	United States
41	Yuri Romanenko	430.765	3	Retired	Soviet Union
42	Sergey Kud-Sverchkov	426.006	2	Active	Russia
43	Andrey Fedyaev	423.167	2	Active	Russia
44	Chen Dong	418.635	3	Active	China
45	Ivan Vagner	416.157	2	Active	Russia
46	Thomas Pesquet	396.482	2	Active	France
47	Zhang Lu	396.161	2	Active	China
48	Aleksandr Volkov	391.495	3	Retired	Soviet Union / Russia
49	Yury Onufriyenko	389.615	2	Retired	Russia
50	Shane Kimbrough	388.728	3	Retired	United States

=== Ten longest human spaceflights ===
#	Time in space	Crew	Country	Launch date (Launch craft)	Landing date (Landing craft)	Space station or mission type
1	437.7 days	Valeri Polyakov	Russia	1994-01-08 (Soyuz TM-18)	1995-03-22 (Soyuz TM-20)	Mir
2	379.6 days	Sergey Avdeev	Russia	1998-08-13 (Soyuz TM-28)	1999-08-28 (Soyuz TM-29)	Mir
3	373.8 days	Oleg Kononenko	Russia	2023-09-15 (Soyuz MS-24)	2024-09-23 (Soyuz MS-25)	International Space Station
3	373.8 days	Nikolai Chub	Russia	2023-09-15 (Soyuz MS-24)	2024-09-23 (Soyuz MS-25)	International Space Station
4	370.9 days	Sergey Prokopyev	Russia	2022-09-21 (Soyuz MS-22)	2023-09-27 (Soyuz MS-23)	International Space Station
4	370.9 days	Dmitry Petelin	Russia	2022-09-21 (Soyuz MS-22)	2023-09-27 (Soyuz MS-23)	International Space Station
4	370.9 days	Francisco Rubio	United States	2022-09-21 (Soyuz MS-22)	2023-09-27 (Soyuz MS-23)	International Space Station
5	365.9 days	Vladimir Titov	Soviet Union	1987-12-21 (Soyuz TM-4)	1988-12-21 (Soyuz TM-6)	Mir
5	365.9 days	Musa Manarov	Soviet Union	1987-12-21 (Soyuz TM-4)	1988-12-21 (Soyuz TM-6)	Mir
6	355.2 days	Pyotr Dubrov	Russia	2021-04-09 (Soyuz MS-18)	2022-03-30 (Soyuz MS-19)	International Space Station
6	355.2 days	Mark T. Vande Hei	United States	2021-04-09 (Soyuz MS-18)	2022-03-30 (Soyuz MS-19)	International Space Station
7	340.4 days	Mikhail Kornienko	Russia	2015-03-27 (Soyuz TMA-16M)	2016-03-01 (Soyuz TMA-18M)	International Space Station, ISS year-long mission
7	340.4 days	Scott Kelly	United States	2015-03-27 (Soyuz TMA-16M)	2016-03-01 (Soyuz TMA-18M)	International Space Station, ISS year-long mission
8	328.6 days	Christina Koch	United States	2019-03-14 (Soyuz MS-12)	2020-02-06 (Soyuz MS-13)	International Space Station
9	326.5 days	Yuri Romanenko	Soviet Union	1987-02-05 (Soyuz TM-2)	1987-12-29 (Soyuz TM-3)	Mir
10	311.8 days	Sergei Krikalev	Soviet Union/Russia	1991-05-18 (Soyuz TM-12)	1992-03-25 (Soyuz TM-13)	Mir

=== Longest single flight by a woman ===
NASA astronaut Christina Koch holds the record for the longest single spaceflight by a woman (328 days), returning on February 6, 2020. During Expedition 61, she surpassed NASA astronaut Peggy Whitson's 289 days from 2016 to 2017.

=== Longest continuous occupation of space ===
An international partnership consisting of Russia, the United States, Canada, Japan, and the member states of the European Space Agency have jointly maintained a continuous human presence in space since 31 October 2000 when Soyuz TM-31 was launched. Two days later, it docked with the International Space Station. Since then, space has been continuously occupied for 26 years, 15 days.

=== Longest continuous occupation of a spacecraft ===
The International Space Station has been continuously occupied by a Russian and US crew member since 2 November 2000 (26 years, 13 days). It broke the record of 9 years and 358 days of the Soviet/Russian Space Station Mir on 23 October 2010.

=== Longest solo flight ===
Valery Bykovsky flew solo for 4 days, 23 hours in Vostok 5 from 14 to 19 June 1963. The flight set a space endurance record which was broken in 1965 by the (non-solo) Gemini 5 flight. The Apollo program included long solo spaceflight, and during the Apollo 16 mission, Ken Mattingly orbited solo around the Moon for more than 3 days and 9 hours.

=== Longest time on the lunar surface ===
Eugene Cernan and Harrison Schmitt of the Apollo 17 mission stayed for 74 hours 59 minutes and 40 seconds (over 3 days) on the lunar surface after they landed on 11 December 1972. They performed three EVAs (extra-vehicular activity) totaling 22 hours 3 minutes, 57 seconds. As Apollo commanders were the first to exit the LM and the last to re-enter, Cernan's EVA time was slightly longer.

=== Longest time in lunar orbit ===
Ronald Evans of Apollo 17 mission stayed in lunar orbit for 6 days and 4 hours (148 hours) along with five mice. For the solo portion of a flight around the Moon, Ken Mattingly on Apollo 16 spent 1 hour 38 minutes longer than Evans' solo duration.

== Speed and altitude records ==
=== Fastest ===
The Apollo 10 crew (Thomas Stafford, John W. Young and Eugene Cernan) achieved the highest speed relative to Earth ever attained by humans: 39,897 kilometers per hour (11,082 meters per second or 24,791 miles per hour, about 32 times the speed of sound and 0.0037% of the speed of light). The record was set 26 May 1969, upon atmospheric entry interface after returning from the Moon.

The record for uncrewed spacecraft is held by the Parker Solar Probe at 191.7 km/s, about 1/1600 (or 0.064%) the speed of light, relative to the Sun. This speed was first reached in December 2024.

=== Farthest ===
The Artemis II crew (Victor Glover, Jeremy Hansen, Christina Koch, and Reid Wiseman) reached a distance of 406,771 km (252,756 mi) from Earth at 23:02 UTC on 6 April 2026 during their lunar flyby.

The farthest uncrewed spacecraft is Voyager 1, at a distance of approximately one light day from Earth as of 2026. Launched in 1977, it became the first spacecraft to enter interstellar space on 25 August 2012.

=== Highest altitude for crewed non-lunar mission ===
Polaris Dawn crew Jared Isaacman, Scott Poteet, Sarah Gillis and Anna Menon fired their Crew Dragon Resilience's Draco thrusters on 11 September 2024 at 00:27 UTC, at 15 hours and 4 minutes after liftoff and achieved a record apogee altitude of 874.95 miles (1,408.10 km).

== Age records ==
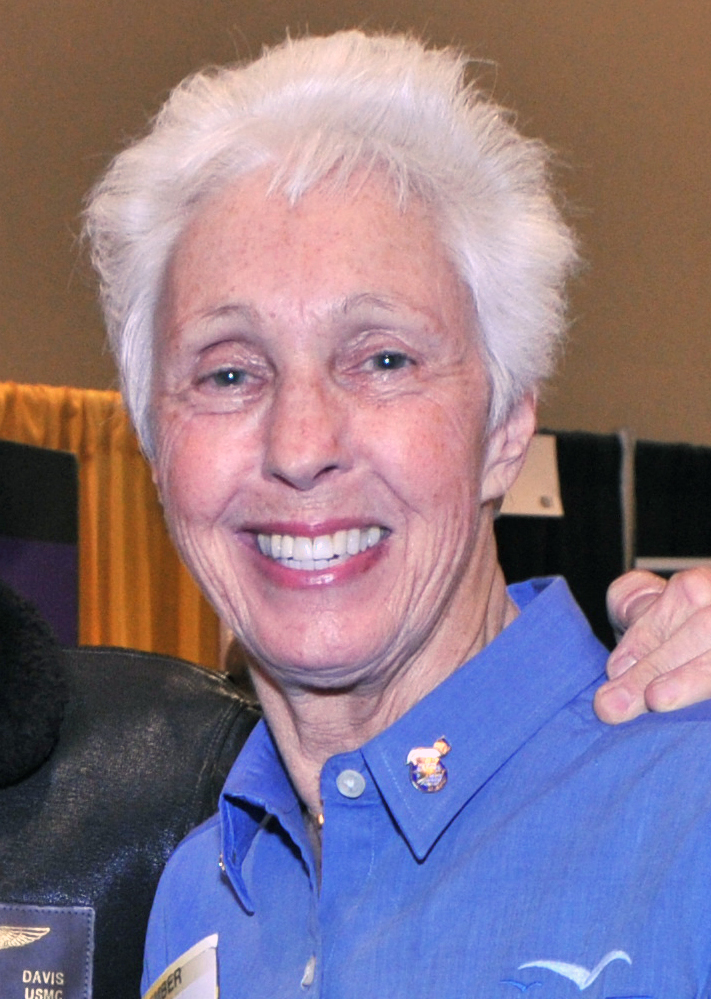
Wally Funk flew in July 2021

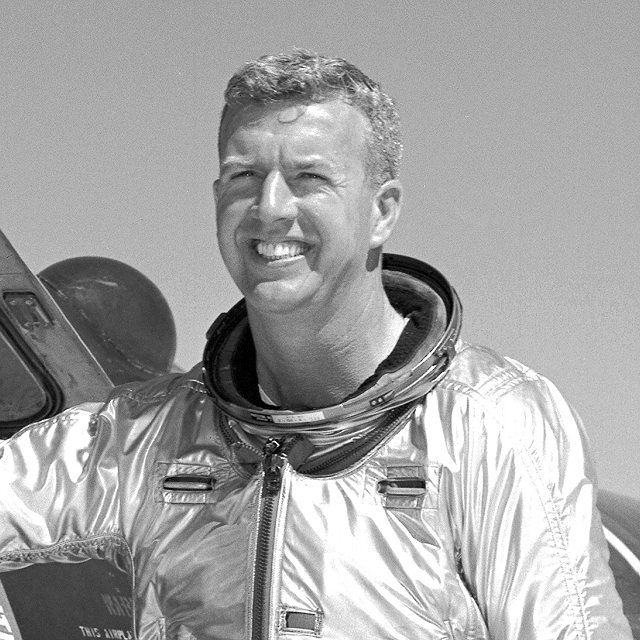
Joe Walker in 1961

=== Earliest-born to reach space ===
==== Suborbital flight ====
- Man – Joe Walker (born 20 February 1921), on X-15 Flight 90 on 19 July 1963 (about 12 minutes.)
- Woman – Wally Funk (born 1 February 1939), on Blue Origin NS-16, on 20 July 2021 (about 10 minutes.)

==== Orbital spaceflight ====
- Man – Georgy Beregovoy (born 15 April 1921), on Soyuz 3 on 26 October 1968 (81 orbits in about 4 days.)
- Woman – Valentina Tereshkova (born 6 March 1937), on Vostok 6 on 16–19 June 1963 (48 orbits, about 3 days.)

=== Youngest ===
==== Suborbital flight ====
- Woman – Anastatia Mayers (aged 18 years, 10 months, and 14 days), on Galactic 02, on 10 August 2023 (about 5 minutes.)
- Man – Oliver Daemen (aged 18 years and 11 months), on Blue Origin NS-16, on 20 July 2021 (about 10 minutes.)

==== Orbital spaceflight ====
- Man – Gherman Titov (aged 25 years, 10 months, and 26 days), on Vostok 2 on 6 August 1961 (17.5 orbits, about 1 day.)
- Woman – Valentina Tereshkova (aged 26 years, 3 months, and 10 days), on Vostok 6 on 16–19 June 1963 (48 orbits, about 3 days.)

=== Oldest ===
==== Suborbital flight ====
- Man: Ed Dwight (aged 90 years, 8 months, and 10 days), on Blue Origin NS-25, on 19 May 2024 (about 10 minutes).
- Woman: Wally Funk (aged 82 years, 5 months, and 19 days), on Blue Origin NS-16, on 20 July 2021 (about 10 minutes).

==== Orbital spaceflight ====
- Man: John Glenn (aged 77 years, 3 months, and 11 days), on STS-95 on 29 October 1998 (about 9 days, 20 hours).
- Woman: Peggy Whitson (aged 65 years, 4 months, and 16 days), on Axiom Mission 4 on 25 June 2025 (about 20 days, 2 hours and 59 minutes).

=== Spacewalk ===
==== Youngest ====
- Woman – Sarah Gillis, (aged 30 years, 8 months, and 11 days), during Polaris Dawn.
- Man – Alexei Leonov (aged 30 years, 9 months, and 18 days), during Voskhod 2.

==== Oldest ====
- Man – Michael Barratt (aged 65 years, 2 months, and 8 days), during ISS Expedition 71.
- Woman – Sunita Williams (aged 59 years, 4 months, and 11 days), during ISS Expedition 72.

== Spacewalk records ==
=== Most spacewalks (number and duration) ===
Both of these are the record for the largest total number of spacewalks by a male and a female, and the most cumulative time spent on spacewalks by a male and a female.

- Man – Anatoly Solovyev, 16 spacewalks for a total time of 82 hours, 21 minutes.
- Woman (number) – Peggy Whitson, 10 spacewalks for a total time of 60 hours, 21 minutes.
- Woman (cumulative time) – Sunita Williams, 9 spacewalks for a total time of 62 hours, and 6 minutes.

=== Most spacewalks during a single mission ===
- 7: Anatoly Solovyev, during Expedition 24 on the Soviet/Russian space station Mir, in 1997–98. (Two were internal "spacewalks" inside a depressurized module.)
- 7: Andrew Morgan, during his first spaceflight on board the ISS for Expedition 60/61/62 in 2019–2020; he spent 45 hours and 48 minutes outside the station.

=== Longest spacewalks ===
- Man – Cai Xuzhe and Song Lingdong, 9 hours 6 minutes, during the Shenzhou 19 mission on 17 December 2024, as they installed space debris protection devices on the exterior of the Tiangong Space Station.
- Woman – Susan Helms, 8 hours 56 minutes, along with James Voss on an ISS assembly mission during Shuttle mission STS-102 on 11 March 2001. The spacewalkers were delayed early in their excursion when a device to help hold an astronaut's feet to the shuttle's robot arm became untethered, and Voss had to retrieve a spare from storage on the exterior of the station's Unity module. After about six hours of work, the pair reentered Space Shuttle Discovery's airlock.

=== Greatest distance from a spacecraft during a spacewalk ===
- All-time (and while on a planetary body): 7.6 kilometers (4.7 miles, 25,029 feet), Apollo 17, Gene Cernan and Harrison Schmitt, EVA-2, December 12, 1972. During their second of three moonwalks, Cernan and Schmitt rode the Lunar Roving Vehicle to geological station 2, Nansen Crater, at the foot of the South Massif. As all spacewalks not occurring on a planetary body (the Moon) have involved short maximum distances from the spacecraft (see below), this remains the farthest distance that humans have traveled away from the safety of a pressurizable spacecraft, during an EVA of any type.
- Orbital flight: about 100 meters (or 330 feet), Bruce McCandless, STS-41-B, February 7, 1984. With the exception of six Manned Maneuvering Unit (MMU) sorties in 1984 and a test of the Simplified Aid For EVA Rescue (SAFER) in 1994, all other orbital spacewalks have involved a safety tether, anchoring the spacefarer to the spacecraft at a short distance. Of all spacewalks to date, Bruce McCandless' first test of the MMU established an orbital EVA distance record from a spacecraft which remained unbroken by later untethered EVAs.

== Animal records ==
=== First animals in space ===
The first animals to enter space were fruit flies launched by the United States in 1947 aboard a V-2 rocket to an altitude of 68 miles (109 km). They were also the first animals to safely return from space. Albert II, a rhesus monkey, became the first mammal in space aboard a U.S. V-2 rocket on June 14, 1949, and died on reentry due to a parachute failure. The first dogs in space were launched 22 July 1951 aboard a Soviet R-1V. "Tsygin" and "Dezik" reached a height of 100 km (62 mi) and safely parachuted back to Earth.

=== First animal in orbit ===
Laika was a Soviet female canine launched on 3 November 1957 on Sputnik 2. The technology to de-orbit had not yet been developed, so there was no expectation for survival. She died several hours into flight. Belka and Strelka became the first canines to safely return to Earth from orbit on 19 August 1960.

=== First Hominidae in space ===
On 31 January 1961, through NASA's Mercury-Redstone 2 mission the chimpanzee Ham became the first great ape in space.

=== Longest canine single flight ===
Soviet space dogs Veterok (Ветерок, "Light Wind") and Ugolyok (Уголёк, "Ember") were launched on 22 February 1966 on board Cosmos 110 and spent 22 days in orbit before landing on 16 March.

=== First animals beyond low Earth orbit ===
An assortment of animals including a pair of Russian tortoises, as well as wine flies and mealworms flew around the Moon with a number of other biological specimens including seeds and bacteria on a circumlunar mission aboard the Soviet Zond 5 spacecraft on 18 September 1968. It had been launched by a Proton-K rocket on 14 September.

Zond 5 came within 2,000 km (1,200 mi) of the Moon and then successfully returned to Earth, the first spacecraft in history to return safely to Earth from the Moon.

== Notable uncrewed, non-human, or unmanned space flights ==
In reference to:	Spacecraft	Event	Origin	Date
Earth	MW 18014 (A-4(V-2))	First rocket to reach space (suborbital flight).	(Nazi Germany) Germany	20 June 1944
Earth	V-2 No. 20	First living organisms (fruit flies) in space (suborbital flight). Successfully recovered.	(United States) USA	20 February 1947
Earth	V-2 No. 47	First mammal in space, Albert II, a rhesus monkey (suborbital flight). Died in capsule parachute failure.	(United States) USA	14 June 1949
Earth	R-1V	First dogs in space (suborbital flight). Successfully recovered.	(Soviet Union) USSR	22 July 1951
Earth	Sputnik 1	First satellite in orbit.	(Soviet Union) USSR	4 October 1957
Earth	Sputnik 2	First animal in orbit, Laika, a dog.	(Soviet Union) USSR	3 November 1957
Earth	Vanguard 1	Oldest satellite still in orbit, in addition to its upper launch stage. Expected to stay in orbit 240 years. Ceased transmission in May 1964.	(United States) USA	17 March 1958
Earth	Pioneer 1	Failed to reach the Moon as intended, but reached a record–setting distance of 113,800 km (70,700 mi) from Earth.	(United States) USA	11 October 1958
Earth	Luna 1	First spacecraft to achieve Earth's escape velocity.	(Soviet Union) USSR	4 January 1959
Moon	Luna 1	First flyby. Distance of 5,995 km (3,725 mi).	(Soviet Union) USSR	4 January 1959
Sun	Luna 1	First spacecraft in heliocentric orbit.	(Soviet Union) USSR	4 January 1959
Moon	Luna 2	First impact on another celestial body.	(Soviet Union) USSR	14 September 1959
Moon	Luna 3	First image of lunar far-side.	(Soviet Union) USSR	7 October 1959
Earth	Discoverer 13	First satellite recovered from orbit.	(United States) USA	11 August 1960
Earth	Korabl-Sputnik 2	First living beings recovered from orbit.	(Soviet Union) USSR	19 August 1960
Earth	Mercury-Redstone 2	First great ape or Hominidae in space, Ham, a chimpanzee (suborbital flight).	(United States) USA	31 January 1961
Venus	Venera 1	First flyby. Distance of 100,000 km (62,000 mi) (lost communication contact before).	(Soviet Union) USSR	19 May 1961
Moon	Ranger 4	First spacecraft to impact the far side of the Moon.	(United States) USA	26 April 1962
Earth	Alouette 1	First satellite designed and constructed by a country other than the USA or USSR (the British satellite Ariel 1, launched five months earlier, was designed and constructed by the USA).	Canada	29 September 1962
Venus	Mariner 2	First planetary flyby with communication contact. Distance of 34,762 km (21,600 mi).	(United States) USA	14 December 1962
Earth	Lincoln Calibration Sphere 1	Oldest spacecraft still in use (59 years as of 2024).	(United States) USA	6 May 1965
Mars	Mariner 4	First flyby and first planetary imaging. Distance of 9,846 km (6,118 mi).	(United States) USA	14 July 1965
Earth	Astérix	First satellite launched independently by a nation other than the USA or USSR (other nations had previously flown satellites launched on American rockets).	France	26 November 1965
Moon	Luna 9	First soft landing and first pictures from the lunar surface.	(Soviet Union) USSR	3 February 1966
Earth	Kosmos 110	First seeds to germinate in space.	(Soviet Union) USSR	22 February 1966
Venus	Venera 3	First impact.	(Soviet Union) USSR	1 March 1966
Moon	Luna 10	First orbiter.	(Soviet Union) USSR	3 April 1966
Docking	Cosmos 186, Cosmos 188	First automated docking of uncrewed spacecraft.	(Soviet Union) USSR	30 October 1967
Moon	Surveyor 6	First planned, controlled, powered flight from the surface of another body.	(United States) USA	17 November 1967
Moon	Zond 5	First to circle the Moon and return to land on Earth.; First animals to circle the Moon (Russian tortoises) .	(Soviet Union) USSR	15 September 1968
Moon	Luna 16	First automated sample return.	(Soviet Union) USSR	24 September 1970
Moon	Luna 17	First robotic roving vehicle, Lunokhod 1.	(Soviet Union) USSR	17 November 1970
Venus	Venera 7	First soft landing on another planet.	(Soviet Union) USSR	15 December 1970
Earth	Salyut 1	First space station.	(Soviet Union) USSR	19 April 1971
Mars	Mariner 9	First orbiter.	(United States) USA	14 November 1971
Mars	Mars 2	First impact.	(Soviet Union) USSR	27 November 1971
Mars	Mars 3	First soft landing. Maintained telemetry signal for 20 seconds before transmissions ceased.	(Soviet Union) USSR	2 December 1971
Sun	Pioneer 10	First spacecraft to achieve the Sun's escape velocity.	(United States) USA	3 March 1972
Jupiter	Pioneer 10	First flyby. Distance of 132,000 km (82,000 mi).	(United States) USA	4 December 1973
Mercury	Mariner 10	First flyby. Distance of 703 km (437 mi).	(United States) USA	29 March 1974
Venus	Venera 9	First orbiter.; First surface-level imaging of another planet.	(Soviet Union) USSR	22 October 1975
Mars	Viking 1	First surface-level imaging of Mars.	(United States) USA	20 July 1976
Saturn	Pioneer 11	First flyby. Distance of 21,000 km (13,000 mi).	(United States) USA	1 September 1979
Venus	Venera 13	First sound recording made on another planet.	(Soviet Union) USSR	1 March 1982
Orbital Space Station	Soyuz T-5, Salyut 7	First species of plant to flower in space. Arabidopsis thaliana Valentin Lebedev.	(Soviet Union) USSR	1 July 1982
Trans-Neptunian region	Pioneer 10	First to travel past the orbit of Neptune, the farthest major planet from the Sun.	(United States) USA	13 June 1983
Venus	Vega 1	First helium balloon atmospheric probe. First flight (as opposed to atmospheric entry) in another planet's atmosphere.	(Soviet Union) USSR	11 June 1985
Comet Giacobini-Zinner	International Cometary Explorer (ICE)	First flyby through a comet tail (no pictures). Distance of 7,800 km (4,800 mi).	(United States) USA	11 September 1985
Uranus	Voyager 2	First flyby. Distance of 81,500 km (50,600 mi).	(United States) USA	24 January 1986
Comet Halley	Vega 1	First comet flyby (with pictures returned). Distance of 8,890 km (5,520 mi).	(Soviet Union) USSR	6 March 1986
Earth	Mir Core Module, Kvant-1	First modular space station.	(Soviet Union) USSR	9 April 1987
Orbital Spaceplane	Buran	First fully automated orbital flight of a spaceplane (with airstrip landing).	(Soviet Union) USSR	15 November 1988
Phobos	Phobos 2	First flyby. Distance of 860 km (530 mi).	(Soviet Union) USSR	21 February 1989
Neptune	Voyager 2	First flyby. Distance of 40,000 km (25,000 mi).	(United States) USA	25 August 1989
Moon	Hiten	First lunar probe launched by a country other than the USA or USSR.	Japan	18 March 1990
951 Gaspra	Galileo	First asteroid flyby. Distance of 1,600 km (990 mi).	(United States) USA	29 October 1991
Jupiter	Galileo probe	First impact.	(United States) USA	7 December 1995
Jupiter	Galileo	First orbiter.	(United States) USA	8 December 1995
Mars	Mars Pathfinder	First automated roving vehicle, Sojourner.	(United States) USA	4 July 1997
433 Eros	NEAR Shoemaker	First asteroid orbiter.	(United States) USA	14 February 2000
433 Eros	NEAR Shoemaker	First asteroid soft landing.	(United States) USA	12 February 2001
Saturn	Cassini orbiter	First orbiter.	ESA; (United States) USA; Italy	1 July 2004
Solar wind	Genesis	First sample return from farther than the Moon.	(United States) USA	8 September 2004
Titan	Huygens probe	First soft landing and the farthest landing ever made.	ESA; (United States) USA	14 January 2005
Comet Tempel 1	Deep Impact	First comet impact.	(United States) USA	4 July 2005
25143 Itokawa	Hayabusa	First asteroid ascent.; First interplanetary escape without undercarriage cutoff.	Japan	19 November 2005
81P/Wild	Stardust	First sample return from comet.	(United States) USA	15 January 2006
Earth	Voyager 1	Farthest distance from Earth (14,841,000,000 miles (2.3884×10^{10} km; 159.66 AU)).; Farthest distance from the Sun (14,912,000,000 miles (2.3999×10^{10} km; 160.42 AU)).	(United States) USA	As of July 2023
Longest time in operation	Voyager 2	Longest continually operating space probe (since August 1977).	(United States) USA	As of 2015
Moon	Moon Impact Probe	First impact on Lunar south pole and discovery of water on Moon.	India	14 November 2008
Earth to Venus trajectory	IKAROS	First interplanetary solar sail.	Japan	Set sail on 10 June 2010
25143 Itokawa	Hayabusa	First sample return from an asteroid.	Japan	13 June 2010
Mercury	MESSENGER	First orbiter.	(United States) USA	17 March 2011
Earth–Sun L2 Lagrange point	Chang'e 2	First spacecraft to reach the L2 Lagrangian point directly from lunar orbit.	China	25 August 2011
International Space Station	SpaceX Dragon 1	First commercial spacecraft to berth with the International Space Station.	(United States) USA	25 May 2012
Interstellar medium	Voyager 1	First spacecraft to cross the heliopause, thereby exiting the heliosphere and entering interstellar space.	(United States) USA	25 August 2012
4179 Toutatis	Chang'e 2	First spacecraft to reach an asteroid directly from a Sun-Earth Langrangian point.; First spacecraft to explore both the Moon and an asteroid.	China	13 December 2012
67P/Churyumov–Gerasimenko	Rosetta	First comet orbiter.	ESA	6 August 2014
Mars	MOM	First Asian nation to achieve Mars orbit and first in the world to do so in first attempt.	India	24 September 2014
67P/Churyumov–Gerasimenko	Philae	First comet soft landing.	ESA	12 November 2014
Ceres	Dawn	First dwarf planet orbiter.	(United States) USA	6 March 2015
Mars	Opportunity	Longest distance traveled on surface of another world (26.219 miles (42.195 km), marathon-length).	(United States) USA	23 March 2015
Mercury	MESSENGER	First impact.	(United States) USA	30 April 2015
Pluto	New Horizons	First flyby of Pluto, Charon, Nix, Hydra, Kerberos, and Styx.; First up-close images of the Pluto system and of Pluto and Charon's surfaces.; First to explore the Kuiper belt.	(United States) USA	14 July 2015
All 9 planets in the pre-IAU redefinition version of the Solar System	All United States spacecraft including New Horizons	With the New Horizons flyby of Pluto, the United States is the first nation to have its space probes explore all nine planets in the pre-2006 IAU redefinition version of the Solar System.	(United States) USA	14 July 2015
Earth	Falcon 9 (B1021)	First re-flight of an orbital class rocket stage after a vertical propulsive landing.	(United States) USA	30 March 2017
Earth	Falcon 9; H-IIA-202	Shortest period between orbital launches (launched 72 seconds apart).	(United States) USA; Japan	23 December 2017
1.66 au heliocentric orbit	Elon Musk's Tesla Roadster on Falcon Heavy Test Flight	First successful Deep Space mission launched successfully on a rocket's maiden flight	(United States) USA	6 February 2018
Moon	Chang'e 4	First soft landing at the far side of the Moon.	China	3 January 2019
Moon	Yutu-2	First lunar rover traversing the far side of the Moon.	China	3 January 2019
Moon	Beresheet	First commercial/privately funded spacecraft to enter lunar orbit.	Israel	4 April 2019
101955 Bennu	OSIRIS-REx	Smallest body to be orbited by spacecraft (492 m (1,600 ft) diameter) and closest ever orbit (680 m (2,230 ft) altitude).	(United States) USA	12 June 2019
Moon	Yutu-2	Longest operational lunar rover after breaking the longevity record of 321 Earth days held by Soviet Union's Lunokhod 1 rover.	China	20 November 2019
Moon	Chang'e 5	First robotic rendezvous and docking by two spacecraft (lunar orbiter attached with reentry-capsule and lunar ascent vehicle) in lunar orbit or any orbit other than Earth's.	China	5 December 2020
Moon	Chang'e 5	First robotic transfer of payload (lunar samples from lunar ascent vehicle to reentry capsule) between two docked spacecraft in lunar orbit or any orbit other than Earth's.	China	5 December 2020
Mars	Ingenuity	First controlled, powered flight by a rotary wing aircraft on another planet.	(United States) USA	19 April 2021
Earth	Zhuque-2	First methane-fueled rocket to reach orbit	China	12 July 2023
Moon	Chandrayaan-3	First soft landing at Lunar south polar region.	India	23 August 2023
Moon	IM-1 Odysseus	First successful commercial and first cryogenic propelled lunar landing. First soft landing within the lunar south pole region at 80.13°S 1.44°E	(United States) USA	22 February 2024
Moon	Chang'e 6	First sample collection and return from the far side of the Moon.	China	3 June, 25 June 2024
Earth	Falcon 9	Most consecutive launch successes of a single type of rocket: 365.	(United States) USA	14 January 2017 – 8 July 2024
Earth	Falcon 9	Most consecutive landing successes of a single type of rocket stage: 267.	(United States) USA	4 March 2021 – 20 August 2024
Earth	Falcon 9 (B1067)	Most vertical landings of a single orbital rocket stage: 37.	(United States) USA	3 June 2021 – present
Earth	Falcon 9 (SN168 passive fairing half)	Most reflown fairing component: 40.	(United States) USA	7 August 2020 – present
Sun	Parker Solar Probe	Highest velocity of a spacecraft relative to the Sun: 191.7 km/s (690,000 km/h; 430,000 mph). Closest approach to the Sun: distance of 0.041 AU (6,160,000 kilometers; 3,830,000 mi). This makes the probe the fastest object in the Solar System apart from comets (overtaking asteroid 2005 HC4).	(United States) USA	24 December 2024
Earth	Falcon 9 (B1088)	Shortest time between two flights of the same orbital rocket stage: 9 days, 3 hours, 49 minutes	(United States) USA	12 March 2025 - 21 March 2025

== See also ==
- First images of Earth from space
- Human presence in space
- List of crewed spacecraft
- List of cumulative spacewalk records
- List of International Space Station spacewalks
- List of Mir spacewalks
- List of spacewalkers
- List of spacewalks 2000–2014
- List of spacewalks and moonwalks 1965–1999
- List of spacewalks since 2015
- Manned Maneuvering Unit
- Omega Speedmaster
- Simplified Aid For EVA Rescue
- Space suit
- Suitport
- Timeline of space exploration, list of firsts in space exploration
