= Scott Poteet =

American fighter pilot and private astronaut (born 1973)

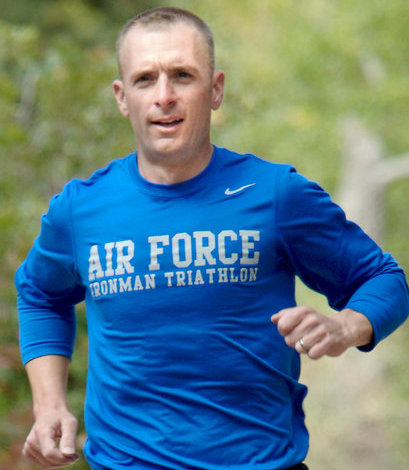
- Poteet in 2010
- Born: December 7, 1973 (age 52); Chattanooga, Tennessee, U.S.
- Education: University of New Hampshire (BS); University of Colorado Colorado Springs (MA)
- Military career
- Allegiance: United States
- Branch: United States Air Force
- Service years: 1998–2016
- Rank: Lieutenant colonel
- Nicknames: "Kidd", "Martian Man"
- Combat operations: Northern Watch; Southern Watch; Joint Guardian; Freedom's Sentinel; Resolute Support
- Space career

Commercial astronaut
- Time in space: 4 days, 22 hours, 13 minutes
- Missions: Polaris Dawn

Scott "Kidd" Poteet (born December 7, 1973) is an American retired pilot from the United States Air Force. He was the pilot of the Polaris Dawn mission in 2024, a privately funded human spaceflight operated by SpaceX for Jared Isaacman. Poteet lives in Stratham, NH.

== Early life ==
He earned a Bachelor of Science degree in Outdoor education at the University of New Hampshire, and later attended the Air Command and Staff College, and earned a Master's degree in counseling and leadership from the University of Colorado Colorado Springs in a program jointly operated with the Air Force Academy.

== Career ==
Poteet is a retired United States Air Force lieutenant colonel who served for 18 years in a variety of roles, including commanding officer of the 64th Aggressor Squadron, pilot in the USAF Thunderbirds (Position 4), test and evaluation pilot, and commercial pilot. Poteet has over 3,200 flight hours on the F-16, A-4, T-38, T-37, T-3 and Alpha Jet. He logged over 400 combat hours during Operations Northern Watch, Southern Watch, Joint Guardian, Freedom's Sentinel, and Resolute Support.

After retiring from the Air Force, Poteet worked as a director of business development at Draken International from 2016 to 2020 and then as the vice president of strategy at Shift4 from 2020 to 2022, under CEO Jared Isaacman. During his time at Shift4, Poteet also trained, and then served, as the mission director of Inspiration4, the first all-civilian human spaceflight mission led by Isaacman as commander.

In 2022, Poteet was selected to serve as the spacecraft pilot of the Polaris Dawn mission, which flew in September 2024. During the flight, Poteet was the backup to Isaacman, the mission commander, who successfully completed the first commercial spacewalk.

== Personal life ==
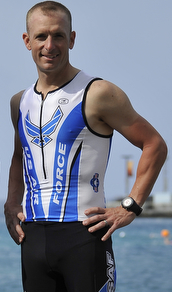
Scott Poteet at 2010 Ironman World Championship

Poteet and his wife Kristen have two daughters and one son. He is a runner and triathlete, competing in 15 Ironman triathlons since 2000, including four Ironman World Championships in Kailua-Kona, Hawaii.

== Media coverage ==
He appears as a mission director in the 2021 docuseries Countdown: Inspiration4 Mission to Space.

== See also ==
- Polaris program
