= Sarah Gillis =

American engineer and commercial astronaut (born 1994)

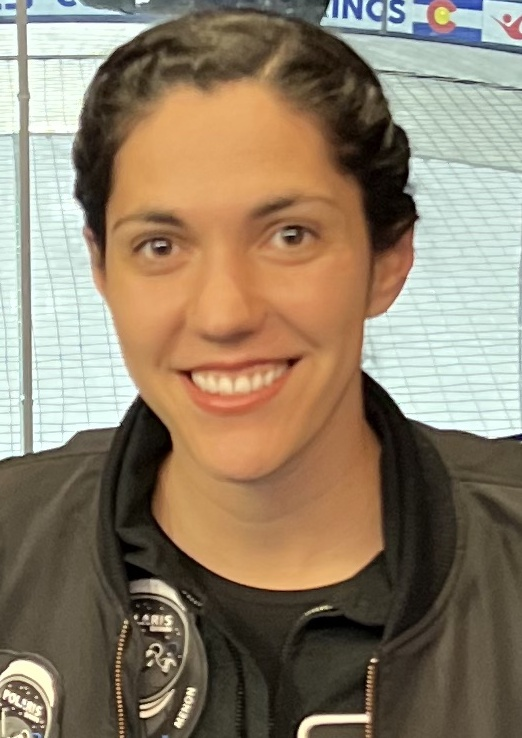
- Born: Sarah Levine; January 1, 1994 (age 32); Palo Alto, California, U.S.
- Education: University of Colorado Boulder (BS)
- Occupations: Senior Space Operations Engineer at SpaceX; Senior Advisor to the Administrator at NASA
- Space career

SpaceX Commercial Astronaut
- Time in space: 4 days, 22 hours, 13 minutes
- Total EVAs: 1
- Total EVA time: 7 minutes, 15 seconds
- Missions: Polaris Dawn

Sarah Levine "Cooper" Gillis (born January 1, 1994) is an American engineer who was employed by SpaceX as the senior space operations engineer and then by NASA as a senior advisor. She flew to space in September 2024 on Polaris Dawn, a private human spaceflight mission, operated by SpaceX on behalf of Jared Isaacman. During the mission, she completed the first commercial spacewalk with Isaacman, becoming the youngest person to date to participate in a spacewalk, and, along with Anna Menon, set a new record for women traveling farthest from Earth.

== Early life and education ==
In 2012, Gillis graduated from Shining Mountain Waldorf School in Boulder, Colorado. She obtained a BS degree in aerospace engineering from the University of Colorado Boulder in 2017, on the advice of her mentor, former NASA astronaut Joseph R. Tanner.

== Career ==
=== SpaceX ===
In 2015, while at the University of Colorado Boulder, Gillis began an internship at SpaceX, working on human-in-the-loop testing of the Dragon spacecraft before moving full-time to the astronaut training program.

She is a lead space operations engineer at SpaceX, responsible for overseeing the astronaut training program for the company's Crew Dragon vehicles. She prepared NASA astronauts for the first Demo-2 and Crew-1 missions and more recently directly trained Inspiration4 astronauts, the first all-civilian crew to go into orbit. Gillis is an experienced Mission Control Operator, who has supported real-time operations for Dragon's cargo resupply missions to and from the International Space Station as a Navigation Officer and as Crew Operations and Resources Engineer (CORE) for crew Dragon missions, the SpaceX equivalent of the NASA CAPCOM role.

=== Polaris Dawn ===
In September 2024 Gillis flew on Polaris Dawn, a private spaceflight operated by SpaceX on behalf of Shift4 CEO Jared Isaacman. She performed a stand-up extravehicular activity (SEVA) with Jared Isaacman, becoming the youngest person to do so. Gillis, along with Anna Menon, set the record for the farthest women from Earth (in 2026, Artemis II mission specialist Christina Koch travelled through lunar deep space). Later during the mission, Gillis, a classically trained violinist, played the solo violin part of "Rey's Theme" by John Williams from the 2015 film Star Wars: The Force Awakens to raise money for St. Jude Children's Research Hospital and El Sistema.

=== NASA ===
As of 2026, she serves at NASA as a Senior Advisor to the Administrator.

== Media coverage ==
Gillis appears in episodes 3, 4 and 5 in the 2021 Netflix series Countdown: Inspiration4 Mission to Space.

== See also ==
- Polaris program
