= Polaris Dawn =

2024 private crewed spaceflight

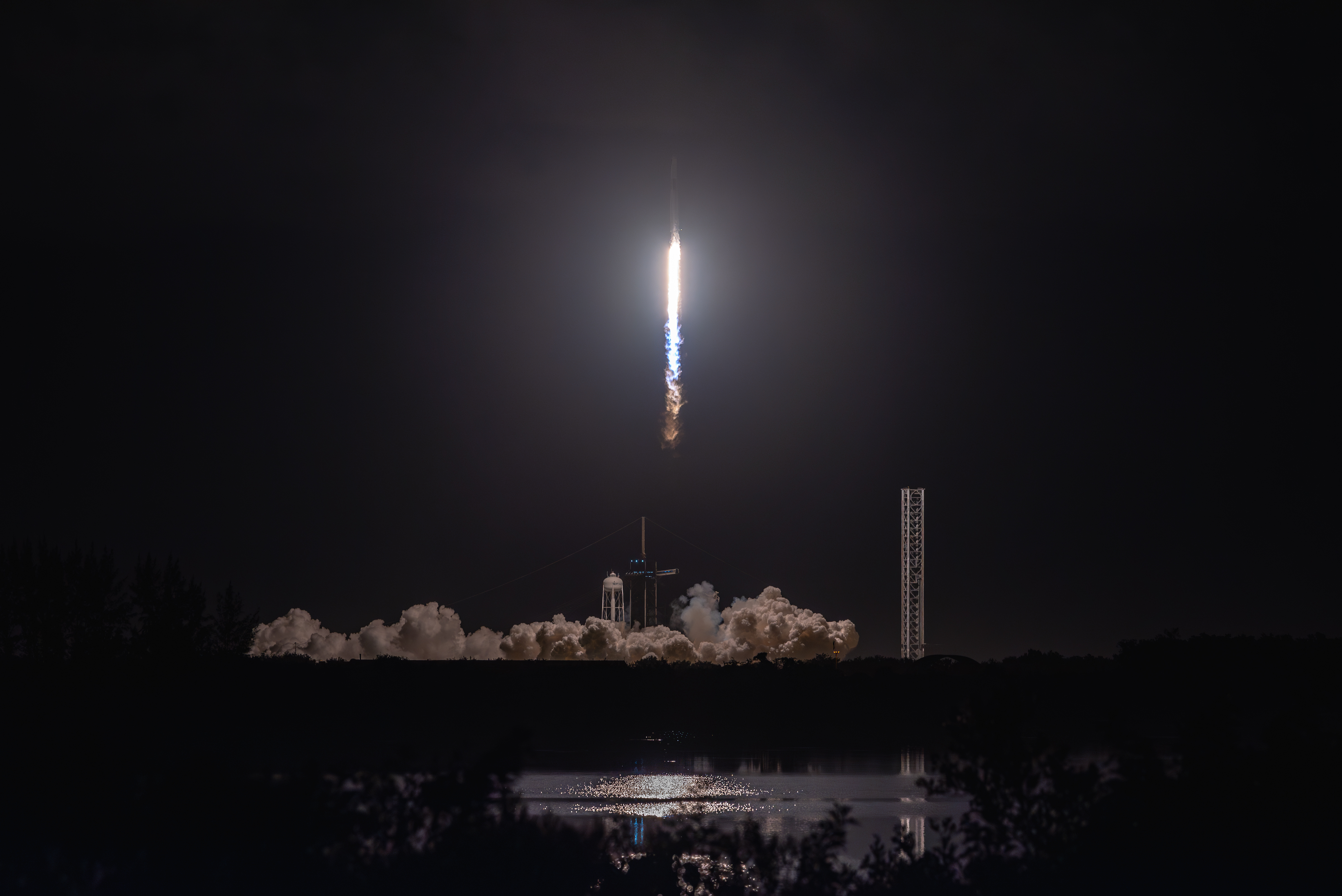
- Launch of Polaris Dawn
- Mission type: Private spaceflight
- Operator: SpaceX
- COSPAR ID: 2024-161A
- SATCAT no.: 61042
- Website: polarisprogram.com/dawn/
- Mission duration: 4 days, 22 hours and 13 minutes
- Orbits completed: 75

Spacecraft properties
- Spacecraft: Crew Dragon Resilience
- Spacecraft type: Crew Dragon

Crew
- Crew size: 4
- Members: Jared Isaacman; Scott Poteet; Sarah Gillis; Anna Menon
- EVAs: 1
- EVA duration: 26 minutes

Start of mission
- Launch date: September 10, 2024, 09:23:49 UTC (5:23:49 am EDT)
- Rocket: Falcon 9 Block 5 (B1083‑4), Flight 372
- Launch site: Kennedy, LC‑39A

End of mission
- Recovered by: MV Shannon
- Landing date: September 15, 2024, 07:36:54 UTC (3:36:54 am EDT)
- Landing site: Gulf of Mexico near Dry Tortugas (25.1°N 83.0°W)

Orbital parameters
- Reference system: Geocentric orbit
- Regime: Low Earth orbit
- Perigee altitude: 190–192 km (118–119 mi)
- Apogee altitude: Launch: 1,200 km (750 mi); Day 1: 1,400 km (870 mi); Day 2–5: 730 km (450 mi)
- Inclination: 51.7°
- Period: 106 minutes
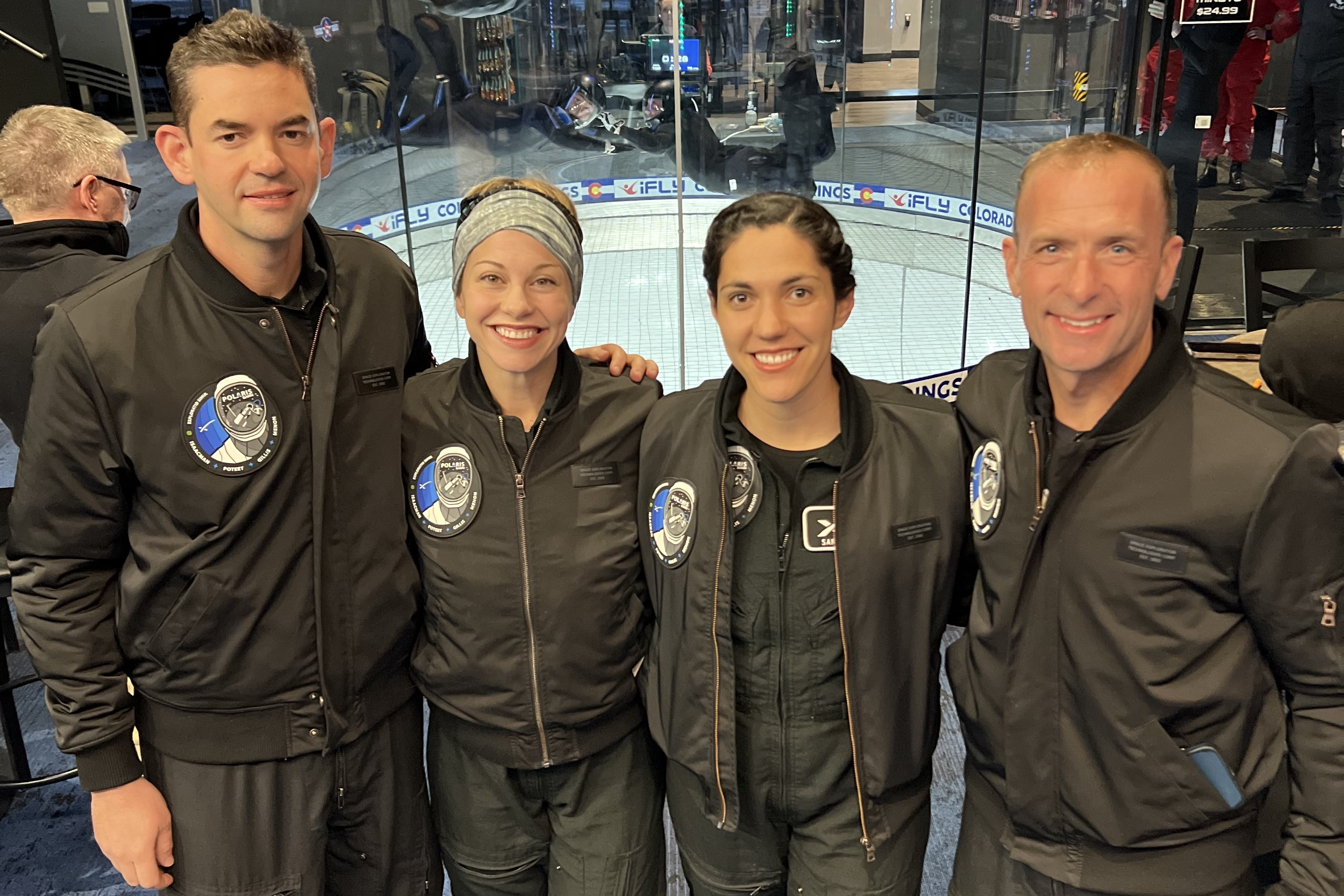
- Mission patch From left: Isaacman, Menon, Gillis and Poteet Crew Dragon flights

Polaris Dawn was a private crewed spaceflight operated by SpaceX on behalf of Shift4 CEO Jared Isaacman, the first of three planned missions in the Polaris program. Launched September 10, 2024, as the 14th crewed orbital flight of a Crew Dragon spacecraft, Isaacman and his crew of three — Scott Poteet, Sarah Gillis and Anna Menon — flew in an elliptic orbit that took them 1,400 kilometers (870 mi; 760 nmi) away from Earth, the farthest crewed non-lunar mission and the farthest any human has been without leaving low Earth orbit. This was also the farthest humans traveled between NASA's Apollo 17 lunar landing in 1972 and Artemis II lunar flyby in 2026. They passed through parts of the Van Allen radiation belt to study the health effects of space radiation and spaceflight on the human body. Later in the mission, the crew performed the first commercial spacewalk.

The Polaris Dawn mission also marked several other milestones. Menon and Gillis flew further from Earth than any women before them and Gillis, at 30 years old, became the youngest person to date to participate in a spacewalk. During the spacewalk, a new record was set for the number of people (four) simultaneously exposed to the vacuum of space. The crew also contributed to breaking the record for the most people (19) simultaneously in orbit, set after the Soyuz MS-26 mission launched on September 11 along with the nine crew members of the International Space Station and the three crew members of China's Tiangong space station.

After a mission lasting nearly five days, the crew safely splashed down in the Gulf of Mexico on September 15.

== History ==
The Polaris program was announced by Jared Isaacman in February 2022, five months after the first all-private astronaut mission, Inspiration4, which raised more than $250 million for St. Jude Children's Research Hospital and was also backed by Isaacman. The program is partnered with St. Jude for the three planned missions, for which the research hospital is the charity beneficiary.

Development of technologies necessary for the mission was part of the program, including extravehicular activity (EVA) spacesuits, intersatellite laser communication links between the Dragon spacecraft and the Starlink constellation, and accommodation for the lack of an airlock in the Dragon capsule.

Originally slated to fly in late 2022, the program suffered delays over the design of the EVA spacesuits and technical problems with SpaceX testing inter-satellite laser communication links. By October 2022, the launch had slipped to March 2023, and by February 2023, had slipped to no earlier than mid-2023. By mid-2023, the flight was delayed until 2024, with Isaacman confirming in December a launch date of April 2024. On June 7, Isaacman announced that the launch was scheduled no earlier than July 12, 2024. Three weeks later, the Polaris program announced on its X account that the earliest launch date was July 31, 2024.

The mission was delayed again following the failure of a Falcon 9 rocket's upper stage on July 12, 2024. After SpaceX addressed the cause of the mishap, SpaceX's Dragon mission management director Sarah Walker announced in a July 26 news conference that Polaris Dawn would launch "in late summer" after the Crew-9 mission for NASA, which had been scheduled to launch no earlier than August 18 before its delay. SpaceX then said that it was targeting an August 26 launch date on August 7. SpaceX pushed the launch date back a day to August 27 in order to allow "additional time for teams to complete preflight" checkouts. The flight was further delayed by weather at the landing site and was scheduled for the early morning of September 6, 2024.

A number of design changes were made to Dragon capsule Resilience before the launch. Several modifications were made to the interior of Crew Dragon Resilience, additional nitrogen and oxygen tanks were installed, a hatch with mechanical supports called the "skywalker" replaced the docking port, and the forward hatch was motorized.

Crew Dragon Resilience arrived at the horizontal integration facility at LC-39A on August 21 where it was integrated with Falcon 9 booster B1083 and a second stage. The transporter erector rolled out of the horizontal integration facility in the early morning of August 24 to transport the rocket up to the pad and erect it next to the tower. The crews completed a dry dress rehearsal and static fire tests on August 25. After a series of further delays—mostly related to capsule recovery weather conditions in the landing zones five days following launch—Polaris Dawn was launched on September 10, 2024.

== Crew ==
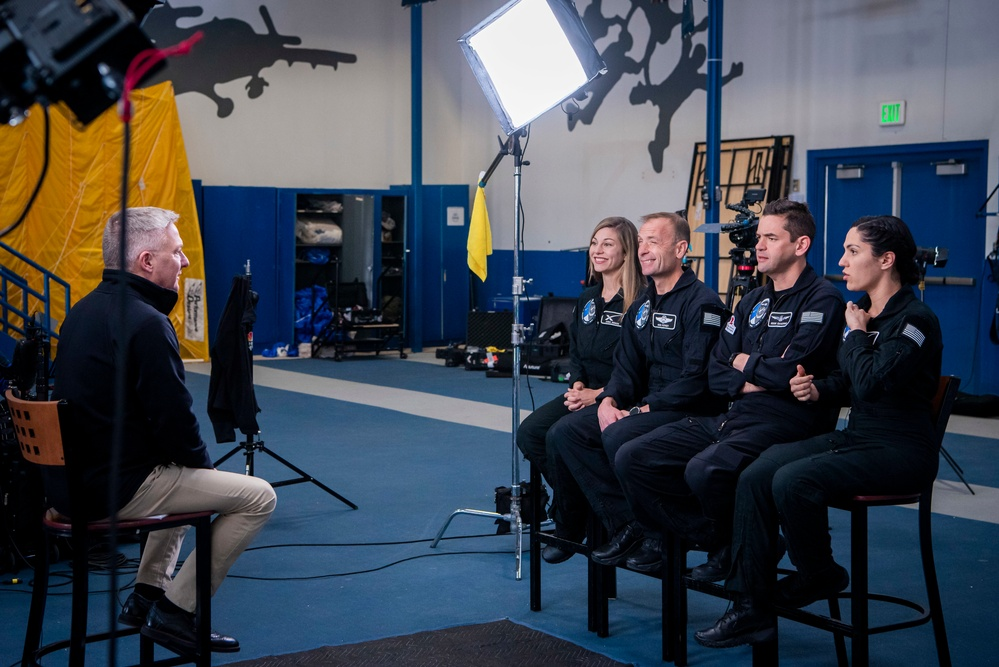
Polaris Dawn crew gives an interview at the US Air Force Academy

Position	Astronaut
Commander	Jared Isaacman; Second spaceflight
Pilot	Scott Poteet; First spaceflight
Mission specialist	Sarah Gillis, SpaceX; First spaceflight
Mission specialist Medical officer	Anna Menon, SpaceX; First spaceflight

Isaacman, 41, headed the mission as commander, with primary spacecraft operation duties. Retired Air Force fighter pilot Scott Poteet, 50, served as spacecraft pilot, assisting Isaacman with spacecraft operation duties. Completing the crew were SpaceX employees Sarah Gillis, 30, and Anna Menon, 38, as Mission Specialists. Gillis is the company's senior space operations engineer who leads crew training for private spaceflight missions, she joined Isaacman on the spacewalk. Menon is a lead space operations engineer and mission director for the company, who acted as onboard medical officer for the mission. She has six years of experience as a biomedical flight controller at NASA, where she oversaw International Space Station operations, including several spacewalks.

== Mission ==
=== Technology ===
SpaceX designed the EVA suits for this mission based on the intravehicular activity (IVA) suits typically worn during launch and landing. The EVA suits are designed to keep astronauts safe in the vacuum of space while also being comfortable and flexible enough for launch and landing, eliminating the need for separate IVA suits. Flame-resistant, stretching fabric and soft joints provide mobility, while boots are made from the same thermal material used on Falcon 9's interstage and Dragon's trunk. Compared to the IVA suits, thermal management has been improved and the helmet has received thermal insulation and an anti-fog treatment. A heads-up display was added to the helmet to provide real-time information on suit metrics during the spacewalk. An umbilical provided life support for these suits, similar to early Gemini suits, as opposed to the self-contained EMUs used on the ISS.

This mission broke the record for the most people in the vacuum of space at once, set at three during Apollo 9 and later repeated just five more times on Apollo 15, 16, 17, Skylab 2, and STS-49. Due to the unique depressurization protocol, the crew conducted research on decompression sickness and spaceflight associated neuro-ocular syndrome (SANS).

To validate their procedures, SpaceX subjected Resilience to multiple cycles of venting and repressurization in a large vacuum chamber. The crew also spent two days in a chamber at the Johnson Space Center to validate their pre-breathing protocol and on another occasion also tested their EVA suits in full vacuum in the chamber.

The mission also saw the first crewed operational test of Dragon laser interlink communication via Starlink. SpaceX hopes that the technology can decrease communication latency and increase data bandwidth for human spaceflight.

=== Events ===
Within an hour of launch, the crew began a pre-breathing protocol to reduce nitrogen in their bodies and minimize the risk of decompression sickness during the planned spacewalk on day three. Over three days, the cabin pressure gradually decreased from 14.5 to 8.6 pounds per square inch (100 to 59 kPa) while oxygen levels increased.

During this first hour in space, the crew conducted thorough checks of the Dragon capsule for any launch-related damage. Afterward, the Draco thrusters fired, propelling them to their highest apogee of the mission, 1,400 kilometers (870 mi; 760 nmi) away from Earth, the highest orbit of the planet flown by a crewed spacecraft at that time, breaking the record set by Gemini 11 (it was exceeded by Artemis II in 2026) and the farthest anyone had been from Earth since the 1972 Apollo 17 lunar landing. Because the Apollo missions had all-male crews, Menon and Gillis broke a record, flying further from Earth than any women before them.

On flight day two, the Dragon's apogee was lowered to its "cruising orbit" of 730 kilometers (450 mi; 390 nmi) while the crew prepared their EVA suits and conducted experiments. On this day, the crew also contributed to breaking the record for the most people (19) simultaneously in space, set after the Soyuz MS-26 mission launched on September 11 along with the nine crew members of the International Space Station and the three crew members of China's Tiangong space station.

Flight day three was dedicated to the first-ever extravehicular activity (EVA) on a commercial spaceflight mission. After extensive preparations, all four crew members donned their EVA suits, which are pressurized with 100% oxygen at 5.1 pounds per square inch (35 kPa). Since the Crew Dragon lacks an airlock, the entire capsule was depressurized during the EVA, exposing all crew members to the vacuum of space, though only two partially exited the spacecraft. Depressurization of the capsule took about 30 minutes. Isaacman went first, spending seven minutes and 56 seconds outside. Gillis went next, spending seven minutes and 15 seconds outside. From hatch open to hatch close the EVA took about 26 minutes and 40 seconds. During the EVA, Isaacman and Gillis performed several tests of their suit mobility including trials of hand/body control, vertical movement, and using a foot restraint, only their lower legs were still inside the spacecraft. Gillis, at 30 years old, became the youngest person to date to participate in a spacewalk.

At the end of the final day on orbit, the crew jettisoned the Dragon's trunk module at 06:35 UTC and carried out a seven-minute deorbit burn at 06:41 UTC. The capsule splashed down in the Gulf of Mexico near Florida's Dry Tortugas islands on September 15, 2024, at 07:36:54 UTC (3:36:54 am EDT, local time at the landing site). The landing site was one of two new options SpaceX added for this mission as it planned for challenging weather conditions.

== Launch ==
Artist's rendering of Resilience for Polaris Dawn, with its nose cone open, and an astronaut exiting the capsule

To minimize the risk of micrometeorite impacts, SpaceX mission controllers had a flexible launch window for the Polaris Dawn mission, allowing them to select a time with minimal debris in the targeted orbit. The Dragon capsule was initially placed in an elliptic orbit with an apogee of 1,200 kilometers (750 mi), passing through the South Atlantic Anomaly at a low altitude of 190 kilometers (120 mi). This exposed the crew to the equivalent radiation of three months on the International Space Station in just a few passes, enabling valuable research into the health effects of space radiation and spaceflight on the human body.

Polaris Dawn launched from Kennedy Space Center Launch Complex 39A on a Falcon 9 Block 5 rocket. The first launch attempt on August 27, 2024 was scrubbed due to a ground-side helium leak. The second launch attempt on 28 August was scrubbed due to poor predicted weather during the recovery period five days after launch. Because the mission would not rendezvous with the International Space Station and had limited life support consumables, the capsule had to be able to splash down as scheduled, which made favorable weather conditions a must. The launch was further delayed because of poor weather causing a lack of favorable launch and return conditions.

As of 8 September 2024, SpaceX said it was targeting no earlier than (NET) 10 September for launch, with weather conditions being 40% favorable for liftoff and splashdown. Polaris Dawn successfully launched on September 10, 2024, at 09:23:49 UTC (5:23:49 am EDT, local time at the launch site).

=== Launch attempt summary ===
Note: times are local to the launch site (Eastern Daylight Time).

Attempt	Planned	Result	Turnaround	Reason	Decision point	Weather go (%)	Notes
1	27 Aug 2024, 3:38:00 am	Scrubbed	—	Technical	26 Aug 2024, 7:17 pm (T−08:21:00)	80	Ground-side helium leak.
2	28 Aug 2024, 3:38:00 am	Scrubbed	1 day 0 hours 0 minutes	Weather	27 Aug 2024, 10:11 pm (T−05:27:00)	85	Poor predicted weather during the recovery period.
3	10 Sep 2024, 5:23:49 am	Success	13 days 1 hour 46 minutes			40	Launched initially scheduled for 3:38 am, delayed to second opportunity for better weather.

== See also ==
- Inspiration4
- Timeline of private spaceflight
