= Jared Isaacman =

American aerospace executive (born 1983)

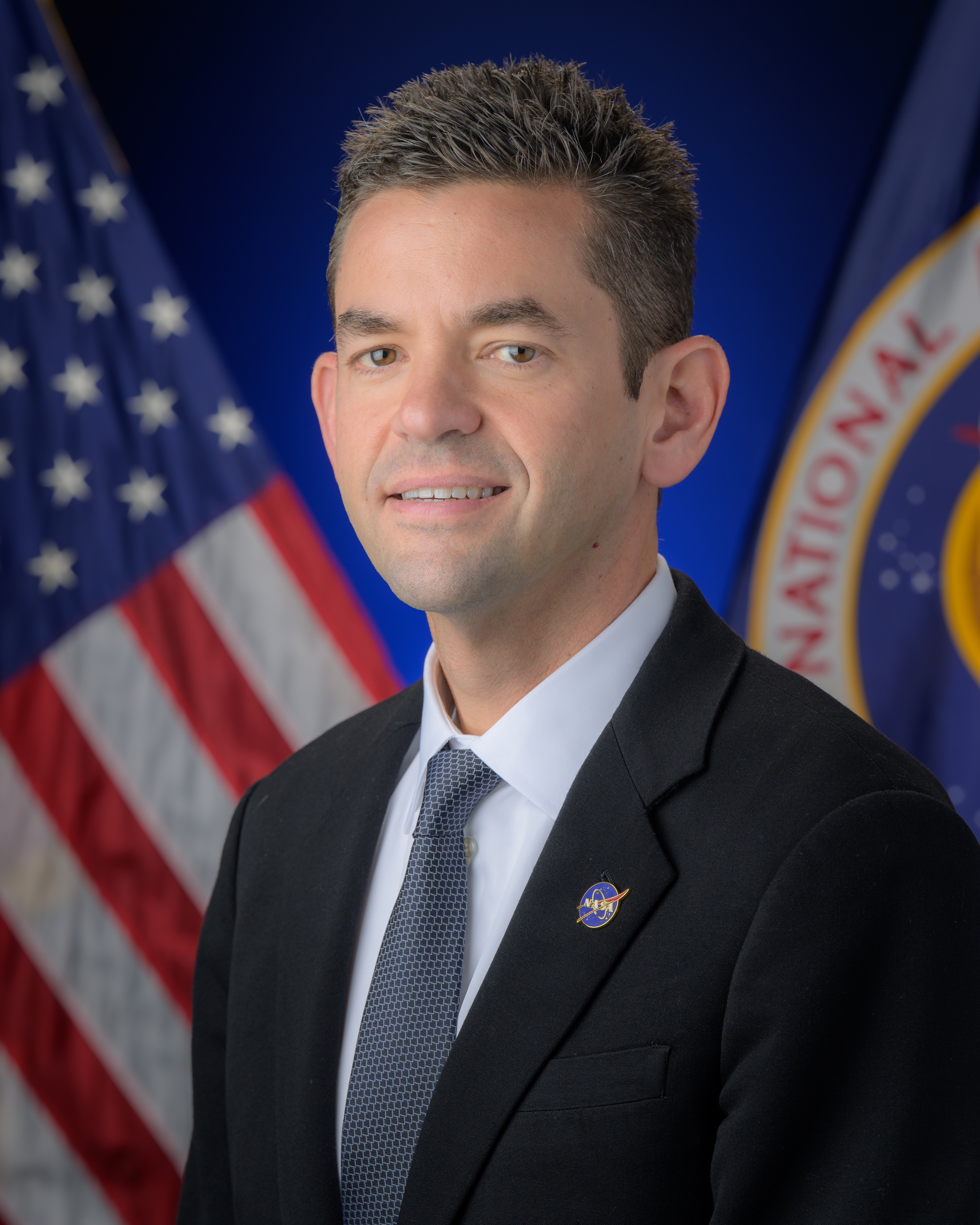
- Official portrait, 2025

15th Administrator of the National Aeronautics and Space Administration
- Incumbent
- Assumed office December 18, 2025
- President: Donald Trump
- Deputy: Matthew P. Anderson
- Preceded by: Sean Duffy (acting)

Personal details
- Born: Jared Taylor Isaacman; February 11, 1983 (age 43) Summit, New Jersey, U.S.
- Spouse: Monica Isaacman
- Children: 2
- Education: Embry-Riddle Aeronautical University, Worldwide (BS)
- Space career

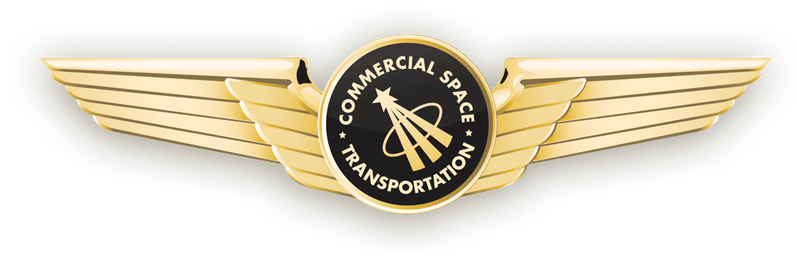
Commercial astronaut
- Time in space: 7 days, 21 hours, 17 minutes
- Total EVAs: 1
- Total EVA time: 7 minutes, 56 seconds
- Missions: Inspiration4; Polaris Dawn

Jared Taylor Isaacman (born February 11, 1983) is an American billionaire entrepreneur, pilot, and commercial astronaut who has served as the 15th administrator of NASA since December 2025. He founded the payment processor Shift4 Payments, which he led as chief executive until 2025, and co-founded Draken International, which provides adversary training to the U.S. and other air forces. Forbes estimated his net worth at US$1.5 billion as of April 2025.

Isaacman commanded Inspiration4 – the first all-civilian spaceflight – using SpaceX's Crew Dragon Resilience, which launched from Kennedy Space Center on September 15, 2021. (Note: Inspiration4 lifted off at 8:02:56 p.m. EDT on September 15, 2021, which was 00:02:56 UTC on September 16) He later led Polaris Dawn, during which he became the first private citizen to perform a spacewalk.

In December 2024, President Donald Trump nominated him to serve as the 15th administrator of NASA. During his April 2025 confirmation hearing, Isaacman emphasized his outsider status and entrepreneurial background, stating his intent to usher in a "new Golden Age of Science and Discovery" at the agency. He faced questions over his close ties to Elon Musk, the founder of SpaceX, one of NASA's largest contractors. On May 31, 2025, Trump, among several actions preceding his feud with Elon Musk, withdrew Isaacman's nomination to serve as NASA administrator. He was renominated on November 4, 2025. He was confirmed as NASA administrator by the Senate on December 17, 2025 and sworn in the following day. As administrator, he has overseen a restructuring of the Artemis program that made Artemis III a 2027 test flight in Earth orbit ahead of a first crewed landing on Artemis IV in 2028, and the crewed lunar flyby of Artemis II in April 2026.

== Early life ==
Isaacman was born on February 11, 1983, at Overlook Hospital in Summit, New Jersey, to Donald and Sandra Marie Isaacman. He is the youngest of four children and is of Jewish descent. His family lived in Union Township before moving to Westfield, New Jersey, around 1987, and later to the Liberty Corner section of Bernards Township when he was 12.

He attended Wilson Elementary School in Westfield and William Annin Middle School in Bernards Township. While a student at Ridge High School, he launched a computer services business with a friend. At age 16, he left school to work full-time, later earning a GED. He received a bachelor's degree with a major in professional aeronautics from the fully online Embry–Riddle Aeronautical University Worldwide Campus in 2011.

== Business career ==
In 1999, Isaacman founded United Bank Card, later renamed Harbortouch and then Shift4 Payments, a point-of-sale payments company, and served as its chief executive officer from its founding until 2025. By 2015, the company was generating $300 million in revenue and processing $11 billion annually. By 2020, it had scaled to $200 billion in payments per year. In the same year, Isaacman took Shift4 public and began processing payments for SpaceX's satellite-internet business, Starlink.

Shift4 expanded internationally through acquisitions, including the cross-border e-commerce payments firm Finaro, announced in March 2022 for $525 million and completed in October 2023, and the tax-free shopping and payments company Global Blue, completed in July 2025. Effective June 5, 2025, Isaacman stepped down as CEO and became executive chairman, and the company's president, Taylor Lauber, succeeded him as CEO. Upon his Senate confirmation as NASA administrator in December 2025, Isaacman resigned as executive chairman and as a director, and Lauber became chairman. Under his agreement with the Office of Government Ethics, Isaacman agreed to vote only about 25% of the company's voting power and was not required to divest his stake. In February 2026, a restructuring collapsed Shift4's multi-class share structure into a single class of common stock and ended Isaacman's rights under a tax receivable agreement, ending the company's status as a "controlled company" under New York Stock Exchange rules; Isaacman remained its largest shareholder, with about 25.9% ownership.

In 2011, Isaacman co-founded Draken International, a defense aerospace company based in Lakeland, Florida, that grew out of his Black Diamond Jet Team and operates one of the world’s largest fleets of privately owned fighter jets. The company provides adversary training to U.S. military pilots and manages hundreds of millions in defense contracts. In 2019, Isaacman sold a majority stake in Draken to Blackstone.

== Aeronautics and astronautics ==
=== Pilot ===
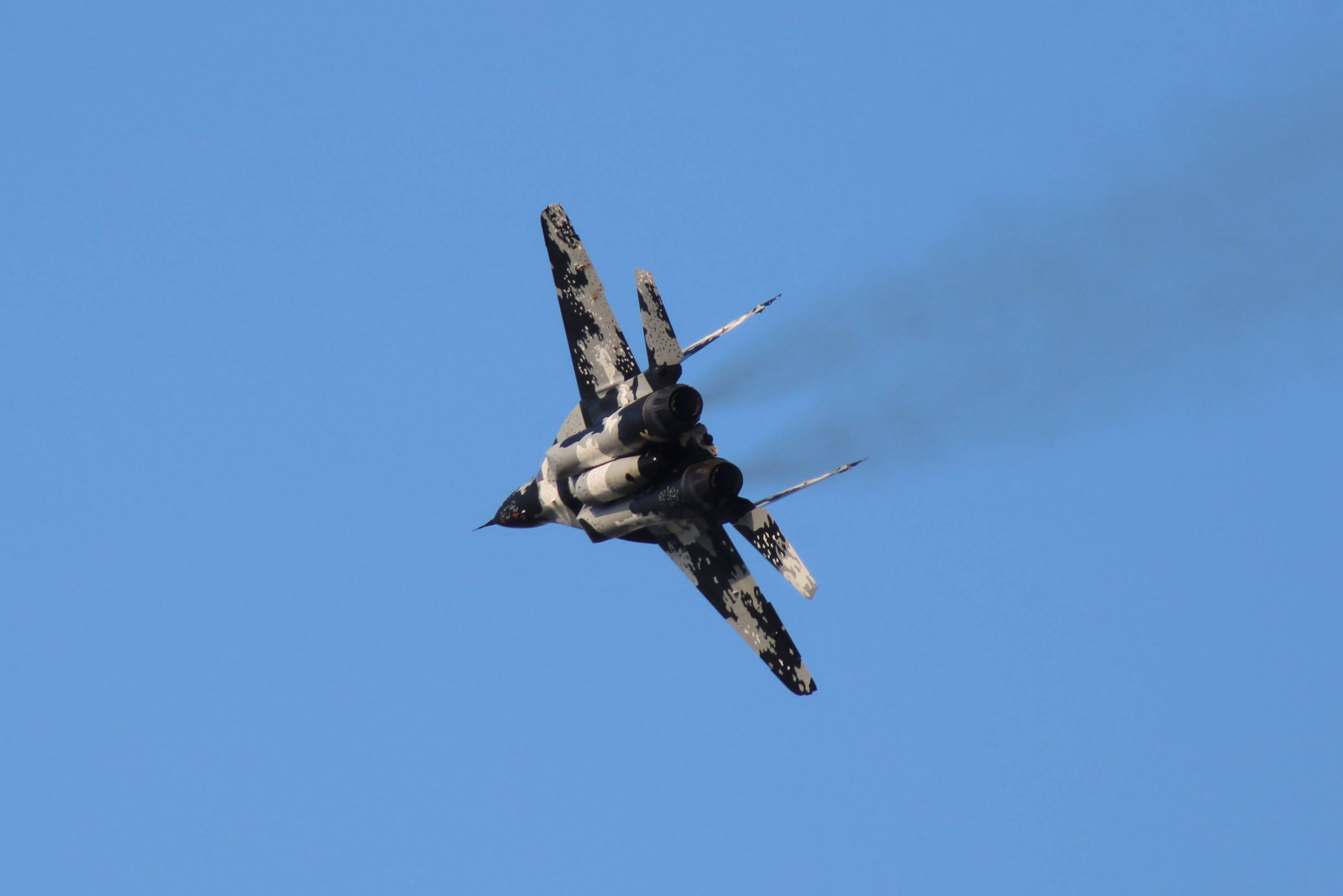
Isaacman's MiG-29UB performing at EAA AirVenture Oshkosh in 2023

Isaacman has logged more than 8,000 flight hours and has flown in more than 100 airshows. He co-founded the Black Diamond Jet Team in 2010, which performs at airshows. He made two attempts to break the world record for circumnavigating the globe in a light jet, achieving the record in 2009 with a time of 61 hours, 51 minutes, and 15 seconds—about 20 hours faster than the previous record. He received the call sign "Rook" during fighter jet training.

Isaacman is flight-qualified in multiple military jet aircraft including the A-4, Alpha Jet, F-5, L-39, L-159, MB-339, MiG-29UB, T-33, and T-38, and holds civilian jet type ratings for the CE-500, CE-510, CE-525 and CE-650 series of Cessna Citation business jets and the RA390 (Premier I).

=== Private spaceflight ===
==== Inspiration4 ====
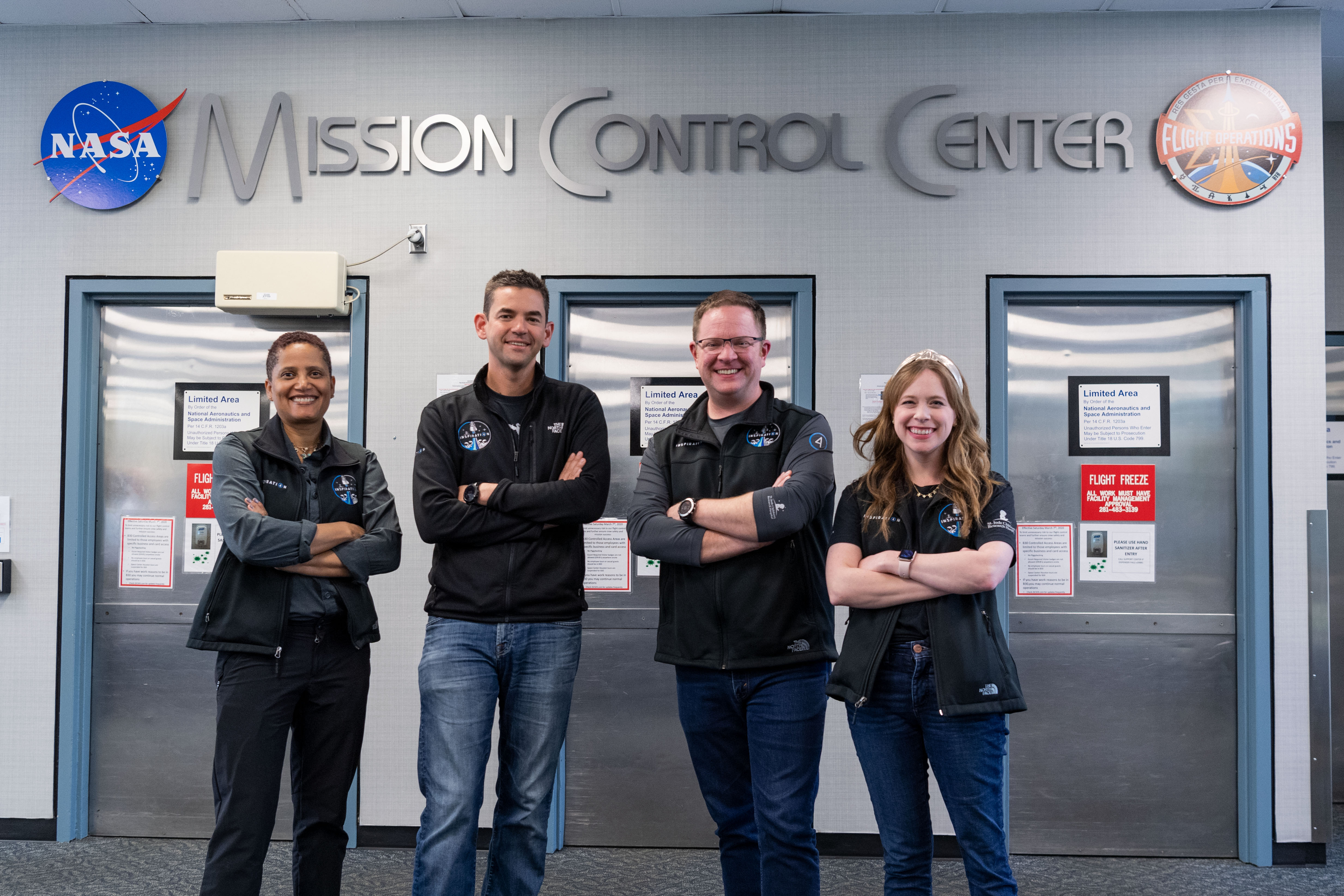
Isaacman (second from left) with his Inspiration4 crewmates at the Johnson Space Center

In February 2021, Isaacman announced he would command Inspiration4, the first orbital mission with no professional astronauts aboard. Operated by SpaceX using the Crew Dragon spacecraft, it launched on September 15, 2021, and orbited Earth for three days. During the mission, Isaacman placed the first known sports bets from space. The flight raised over $250 million for St. Jude Children’s Research Hospital, a cause Isaacman championed throughout the mission.

==== Polaris Dawn ====
In 2024, Isaacman led Polaris Dawn, the first mission in the privately funded Polaris Program. The four-person crew reached a peak altitude of 1,400 kilometres (870 mi), the farthest from Earth any human had gone since Apollo 17, before lowering to 700 km (430 mi). On September 12, Isaacman and crewmate Sarah Gillis performed the first private extravehicular activity (EVA), becoming the first civilians to conduct a spacewalk, technically a Stand-up EVA (SEVA) as at no point did either crew-member fully exit the spacecraft. Over the five-day flight, the crew conducted about 36 science experiments with 31 institutions and tested Starlink laser-based communications in orbit.

In written answers to senators following his April 2025 confirmation hearing, Isaacman said he had terminated his contracts with SpaceX for future Polaris Program missions and had been refunded the advance payments he made for them.

== Administrator of NASA ==
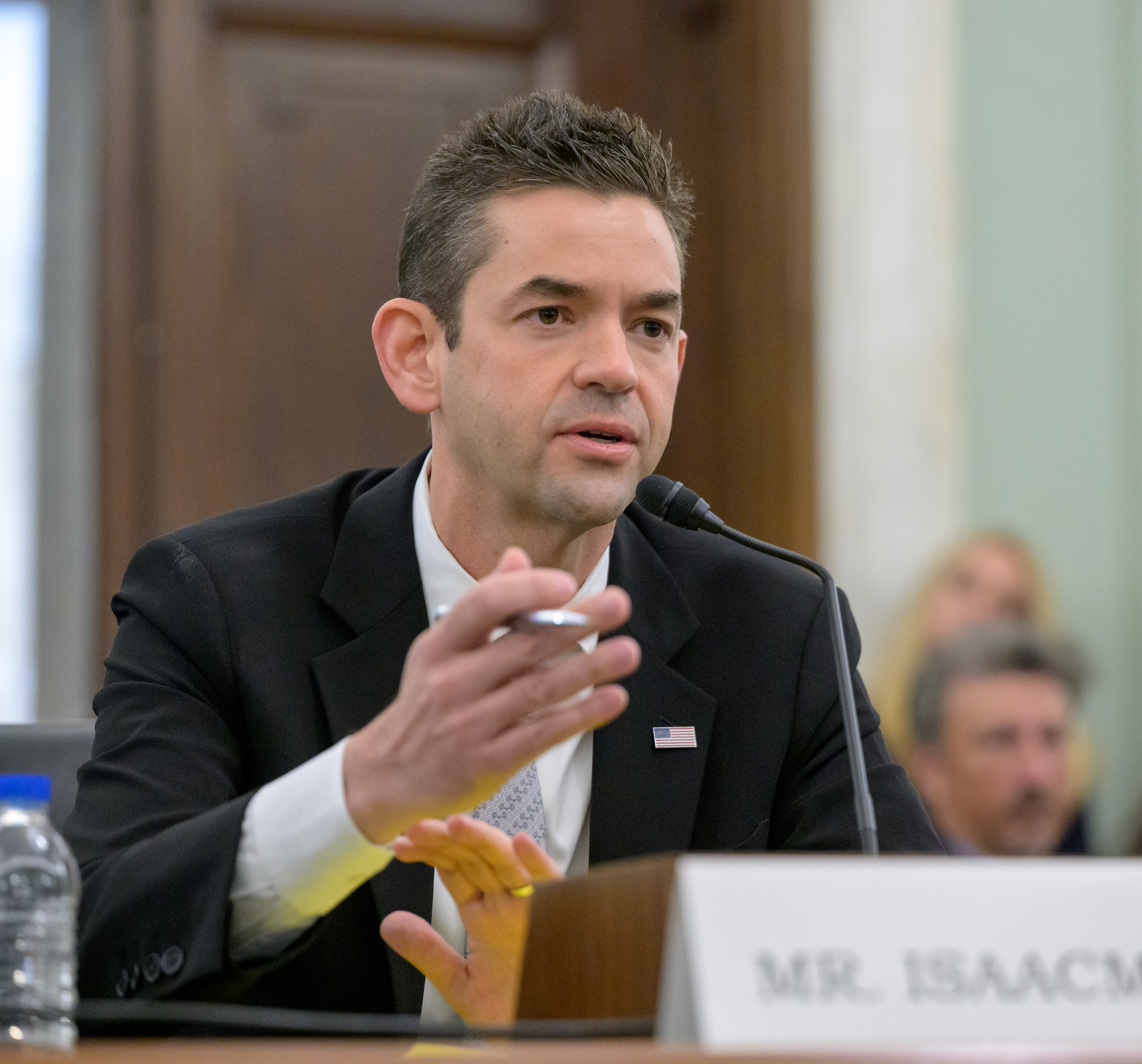
Isaacman speaks at his first confirmation hearing.

=== First nomination and rescission ===
On December 4, 2024, Isaacman was nominated by President-elect Donald Trump to serve as the 15th administrator of NASA, marking the first time a president-elect had named a nominee for the position before taking office. His nomination was formally submitted on Inauguration Day, January 20, 2025. This made Trump both NASA's earliest and most-recent nominating president, following the September 2017 selection of Jim Bridenstine during his first presidency.

Isaacman's nomination received broad support from both political and aerospace circles. Senator Ted Cruz, chair of the Committee on Commerce, Science, and Transportation, received endorsements from 24 former astronauts, Alabama governor Kay Ivey, and a coalition of southern governors urging swift confirmation. However, critics raised concerns about his ties to SpaceX and Elon Musk, fearing NASA might prioritize a Mars landing driven by SpaceX's ambitions at the expense of the Artemis mission to the Moon and other programs. These concerns intensified following Musk's calls to decommission the International Space Station and for abandonment of lunar exploration in favor of accelerated Mars missions, statements that provoked sharp criticism from Cruz.

In a March 12, 2025 ethics agreement letter to NASA's designated agency ethics official, Isaacman pledged to resign from his role at Shift4 and cancel the remaining Polaris Program missions if confirmed. He reiterated this commitment during his April 9 confirmation hearing, and assured lawmakers that the Artemis and Commercial Lunar Payload Services programs would remain top priorities under his leadership.

Over nearly three hours of testimony, Isaacman presented a vision of revitalizing NASA with a "mission-first" culture focused on efficiency, innovation, and strategic leadership in space. While expressing support for Artemis II and III using the Space Launch System rocket and the Orion spacecraft, he questioned the long timelines and high costs of these systems, asking, "Why is it taking us so long, and why is it costing us so much to go to the Moon?" Isaacman advocated for data-driven reviews of their future roles, signaling that they may not be viable long-term solutions for deep space exploration. He also said that extending the life of the ISS through 2030 seemed reasonable, and called for expanding scientific output through public-private partnerships. Pressed by senators on restructuring, conflicts of interest, and the rationale for Mars exploration, Isaacman emphasized transparency, independence, and a dual-track approach to Moon and Mars. Isaacman also said that a White House proposal to cut about 50% of NASA's science budget and about 20% of its overall budget in 2026 would not be "optimal".

When asked by Ed Markey about his ties to Musk, Isaacman denied that they were close, adding that he had not disclosed his plans for NASA to Musk, and that he had only been interviewed by Trump when offered the job. However, when asked by Markey whether or not Musk was present at his interview with Trump, Isaacman refused to directly answer.

Reuters reported that Isaacman had been arrested at the Canadian border in 2010 on a Nevada warrant related to checks written to casinos; in his nomination questionnaire, Isaacman said the arrest stemmed from a payment dispute with a Las Vegas casino that he resolved in less than 24 hours, and that the charges were dismissed. In written questions, Senator Maria Cantwell also asked him about four civil lawsuits filed between 2008 and 2010 over casino debts and allegations of bad checks. Isaacman responded that he had spent time in casinos as "an immature hobby" in his early 20s and that the legal matters "were, in fact, forms of negotiation and were all resolved promptly."

Isaacman passed the Senate Committee vote 19–9 on April 30.

On May 31, Semafor reported that the White House had withdrawn Isaacman's nomination. Trump later stated that the withdrawal was due to Isaacman's "prior associations," referring to his past political donations to Democratic candidates. According to The New York Times, Trump had been aware of those donations during his presidential transition. A White House spokesperson defended the decision, stating that it was "essential that the next leader of NASA is in complete alignment with President Trump's America First agenda". However, Ars Technica reported that the withdrawal was a way to punish Elon Musk, as the decision came just days after he announced he would be pulling back from his role in the Trump Administration. Axios corroborated this claim, adding that Trump advisor and Musk critic Sergio Gor was a major driving figure behind Isaacman's rescinded nomination.

On July 9, Isaacman said in an interview that he was considering running for Congress as a Republican. "I don't think my story in politics is over," he said. "Once I got over some of the initial intimidation factor of being in the arena, I felt like I could actually help and contribute. There will be something else."

=== Second nomination ===
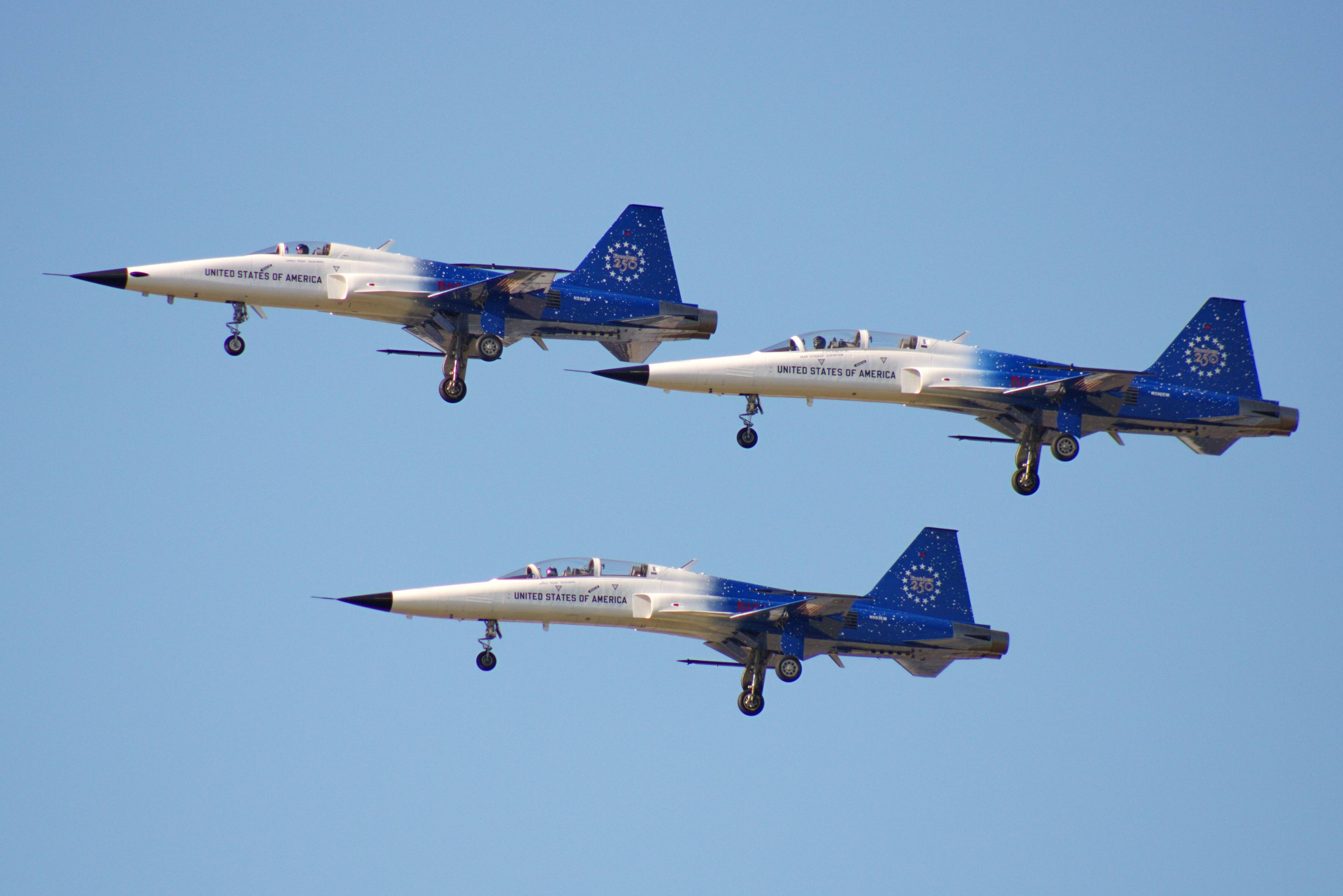
Isaacman (below) flying in a formation of F-5 Tiger II fighters with commemorative United States Semiquincentennial liveries during the 2026 Sun 'n Fun airshow

On October 9, Bloomberg News reported that Isaacman had met with Trump several times to discuss the possibility of reconsidering his nomination. Reuters corroborated the report several days later, stating that Isaacman had been interviewed by acting NASA administrator Sean Duffy as a potential successor to the role. However, The Wall Street Journal reported that a power struggle between Isaacman and Duffy had begun to emerge over the permanent position, drawing particular attention amid reports that Duffy had expressed interest in folding NASA into the Department of Transportation.

On November 4, Trump announced that he was again nominating Isaacman to serve as NASA administrator. After his renomination, Isaacman also faced scrutiny over a leaked internal reform proposal, known as "Project Athena", which outlined plans to restructure NASA and was reported to have been disclosed by associates of Duffy.

Project Athena is a 62-page policy blueprint drafted by Isaacman and his advisors in early 2025 following his nomination as NASA administrator. The plan seeks to return NASA to "achieving the near impossible" by focusing on three core goals: leading the world in human space exploration, igniting the space economy, and becoming a multiplier for science. It has received particular attention through proposals such as reforming NASA's spending and investment returns, transitioning away from cost-plus contracts for the Space Launch System rocket and Orion spacecraft, and potentially repurposing elements of the Lunar Gateway space station for a nuclear-powered space tug. Additionally, Project Athena calls for expanding partnerships with the commercial space industry (most notably SpaceX and Blue Origin) in order to stretch public funding and maintain competitive advantage.

Isaacman's second Senate confirmation hearing was held on December 3, during which he defended the Project Athena proposal and sought to reassure lawmakers that he would preserve existing congressional priorities for the agency. Asked about the Trump administration's Golden Dome plans, he described space as "the high ground" and "of great strategic importance" and called for a more "unified approach" between NASA and the Department of Defense to avoid duplicative spending.

Isaacman was confirmed by the Senate on December 17 by a vote of 67–30. He was officially sworn in the following day.

=== Tenure ===
On the day Isaacman was sworn in, Trump signed executive order 14369, "Ensuring American Space Superiority", directing NASA to return American astronauts to the Moon by 2028 and to establish initial elements of a permanent lunar outpost, including a nuclear reactor, by 2030.

In February 2026, NASA released its investigation report on the 2024 Starliner Crewed Flight Test and classified the flight as a Type A mishap, its most serious category, citing the spacecraft's loss of maneuverability during its approach to the International Space Station. Isaacman said NASA had allowed the programmatic goal of having two crew transport providers to "influence engineering and operational decisions" and announced "leadership accountability" measures. Later that month, NASA restructured the Artemis program: it standardized the configuration of the Space Launch System, added a mission in 2027 and called for at least one crewed lunar landing per year thereafter. Under the revised plan, Artemis III became a 2027 test of systems and operations in low Earth orbit, intended to include rendezvous and docking with one or both of the commercial lunar landers being developed by SpaceX and Blue Origin, while the first landing moved to Artemis IV in 2028, near the lunar south pole.

On March 24, 2026, at an agency event called "Ignition", NASA announced that it would "pause Gateway in its current form" and redirect resources toward a phased lunar surface base; increase robotic Commercial Lunar Payload Services deliveries to up to 30 landings beginning in 2027; launch Space Reactor-1 Freedom, a nuclear electric propulsion spacecraft, to Mars before the end of 2028; and convert thousands of contractor positions to civil service jobs. For low Earth orbit, NASA proposed, alongside existing plans, a government-owned core module attached to the ISS to which commercial modules would be added before later detaching as free-flying stations. Isaacman said the Gateway decision "should not surprise anyone". Some industry representatives and foreign space agencies said privately that they had been surprised by announcements affecting their plans, and European suppliers of Gateway hardware noted that Congress had approved $2.6 billion for the station after the administration proposed canceling it in its fiscal 2026 budget request, and that the pause would still require congressional approval.

Artemis II, the first crewed flight of the SLS and Orion, launched on April 1, 2026 with NASA astronauts Reid Wiseman, Victor Glover, and Christina Koch, and Canadian astronaut Jeremy Hansen. The crew flew around the Moon and splashed down in the Pacific Ocean off San Diego on April 10; at their farthest, they were 252,756 miles (406,771 km) from Earth, surpassing the distance record set by the crew of Apollo 13 in 1970.

The administration's fiscal year 2027 budget request proposed $18.8 billion for NASA, about 23% less than the agency's fiscal 2026 appropriation. It increased funding only for the Exploration account, reduced science funding from $7.25 billion to under $3.9 billion and proposed eliminating the Office of STEM Engagement. In April 2026 testimony to House and Senate appropriations subcommittees, Isaacman said the request, together with funding from the 2025 budget reconciliation law, would focus NASA on landing astronauts on the Moon by 2028. Lawmakers of both parties criticized the proposed cuts: House subcommittee chairman Hal Rogers called the request "disappointing", Senate subcommittee chairman Jerry Moran said that prioritizing exploration "at the expense of science, technology, and other core missions" risked undermining it, and ranking member Chris Van Hollen called it "short-sighted". Isaacman responded that science missions omitted from budget documents had not been canceled and could be restructured to be done "better, faster, and at lower cost".

On August 28, 2026, Trump signed an executive order establishing a United States Space Academy. Isaacman chaired the first meeting of the Presidential Commission on the United States Space Academy on September 9, after which NASA requested information from states interested in hosting it. NASA's SpaceX Crew-13 mission launched to the ISS on October 1, 2026. On October 8, Isaacman and Secretary of Energy Chris Wright signed a memorandum of understanding on space nuclear power and propulsion, setting a framework for collaboration from research and fuel production through testing, launch and operations, which took effect on November 1, 2026.

== Philanthropy ==
In 2021, Isaacman financed the first all-civilian mission to orbit to benefit St. Jude Children's Research Hospital. Isaacman commanded the three-day spaceflight and raised over $250 million for St. Jude, pledging over $125 million of his own money.

That same year, Isaacman and his family signed The Giving Pledge, an agreement to donate at least half their fortune to philanthropic causes.

He also donated $10 million to the U.S. Space & Rocket Center, the Huntsville, Alabama museum and education center that offers Space Camp, which Isaacman attended as a child. He donated $10 million in 2021 to the National Naval Aviation Museum Foundation in honor of Navy pilot Dale Snodgrass. In July 2025, Isaacman made a second donation to the U.S. Space & Rocket Center, giving $15 million for its Inspiration4 Skills Training Complex and seed money for a new Space Camp dormitory.

== Personal life ==
Isaacman is ethnically Jewish. While he has stated he is not religious, he has been a contributor to a local synagogue in New Jersey. He is married to Monica Isaacman and has two daughters. In the late 2000s, Isaacman lived in Washington Township, New Jersey. As of 2025, he resides in Pennsylvania with his wife and daughters.

== Awards ==
- Living Legends of Aviation Eren Ozmen Entrepreneur of the Year Award 2022
- National Space Society's Space Pioneer Award 2023
- National Business Aviation Association's Meritorious Service to Aviation Award 2023
- Foreign Policy Research Institute's Benjamin Franklin Award 2024
- Aircraft Owners and Pilot Association's R.A. “Bob” Hoover Trophy 2025
- Space Omics and Medical Atlas Torchlight Award 2024
- National Space Society's Wernher von Braun Memorial Award 2025
- Living Legends of Aviation Buzz Aldrin Space Advancement Award 2025
- Society of Experimental Test Pilots Honorary Fellow 2025

== See also ==
- Countdown: Inspiration4 Mission to Space (2021 Netflix documentary series)

== Notes ==
Government offices
Preceded by Sean Duffy; Acting	Administrator of the National Aeronautics and Space Administration; 2025–present	Incumbent
