= Countdown: Inspiration4 Mission to Space =

2021 Netflix docuseries

- Genre: Spaceflight documentary
- Based on: SpaceX Inspiration4 mission
- Directed by: Jason Hehir
- Country of origin: United States
- Original language: English
- No. of episodes: 5

Production
- Production locations: United States, low Earth orbit
- Production companies: TIME Studios; Known; Words + Pictures; JMH Films

Original release
- Release: 6 September – 30 September 2021

Countdown: Inspiration4 Mission to Space is a 2021 American five-part docuseries jointly produced by Netflix and Time Studios to chronicle, in near real-time, the successful SpaceX Inspiration4 orbital mission which occurred in September 2021.

== Conception and announcement ==
Netflix confirmed the production of the documentary series about the first all-civilian orbital mission on its Twitter account on 3 August 2021

The project began in January 2021.

== Promotion and release ==
SpaceX founder Elon Musk used social media to urge his followers to watch the Netflix series. On the day of Inspiration4's launch, he also used Twitter to urge his followers to tune into the Netflix YouTube channel to watch the launch of the historic mission.

The first four episodes were released for streaming on schedule, airing 6 and 13 September 2021. The final episode was released on 30 September and captured the Inspiration4 crew's launch, orbital activities, and successful return to Earth.

== Reception ==
Early reviews of the series praised its portrayal of the civilian crew and its in-orbit footage, but also criticized the initial episodes as overly promotional.

Jeff Foust indicated that while the exclusive footage and the interviews were fascinating, the docuseries lacked drama, and expressed the concern that it could be a new template for Space Age media relations

== Episodes ==
No.	Directed by	Original release date
1	Jason Hehir	September 6, 2021
2	Jason Hehir	September 6, 2021
3	Jason Hehir	September 13, 2021
4	Jason Hehir	September 13, 2021
5	Jason Hehir	September 30, 2021

== See also ==
- SpaceX Dragon 2
