= Lists of astronauts =

List of astronauts or space travellers, may refer to:

== By name ==
- List of astronauts by name

== By nationality ==
- List of space travelers by nationality
- Timeline of space travel by nationality
- American astronauts
  - List of American astronauts by birthplace
  - List of Apollo astronauts
  - List of Gemini astronauts
  - Mercury Seven
  - NASA Astronaut Corps
  - NASA Astronaut Group 2
  - NASA Astronaut Group 3
  - NASA Astronaut Group 4
  - NASA Astronaut Group 5
  - NASA Astronaut Group 6
  - NASA Astronaut Group 7
  - NASA Astronaut Group 8
  - NASA Astronaut Group 9
  - NASA Astronaut Group 10
  - NASA Astronaut Group 11
  - NASA Astronaut Group 12
  - NASA Astronaut Group 13
  - NASA Astronaut Group 14
  - NASA Astronaut Group 15
  - NASA Astronaut Group 16
  - NASA Astronaut Group 17
  - NASA Astronaut Group 18
  - NASA Astronaut Group 19
  - NASA Astronaut Group 20
  - NASA Astronaut Group 21
  - NASA Astronaut Group 22
  - NASA Astronaut Group 23
  - List of United States Marine Corps astronauts
  - List of United States Space Force astronauts
- Canadian Astronaut Corps
- List of Chinese astronauts
- List of Indian astronauts
- List of Japanese astronauts
  - JAXA Astronaut Corps
- List of cosmonauts
  - Roscosmos Cosmonaut Corps
- List of European astronauts
  - European Astronaut Corps
    - 2022 European Space Agency Astronaut Group
  - List of Dutch astronauts
  - List of French astronauts
  - List of German astronauts
  - List of Italian astronauts
  - List of Polish astronauts

== By demographic group ==
- List of African-American astronauts
- List of Arab astronauts
- List of Asian astronauts
- List of Asian American astronauts
- List of women astronauts
- List of Hispanic astronauts
- List of Ibero-American spacefarers
- List of astronauts of Indian origin
- List of Muslim astronauts
- List of billionaire spacetravellers

== By achievement ==
- List of cumulative spacewalk records
- List of inductees in the International Space Hall of Fame
- List of visitors to the International Space Station
- List of crew of the International Space Station
- List of commanders of the International Space Station
- List of Artemis astronauts
- List of Mir visitors
- List of Space Shuttle crews
- List of spacewalkers
- List of Salyut visitors
- List of human spaceflights in Tiangong Program
- Lists of spacewalks and moonwalks

== By education ==
- List of astronauts educated at the Massachusetts Institute of Technology
- List of astronauts educated at the United States Military Academy
- List of astronauts educated at the United States Naval Academy
- List of astronauts educated at the University of California
- List of astronauts educated at the University of Colorado Boulder
- List of astronauts educated at the University of Kansas
- List of astronauts educated at Stanford University

== Other ==
- List of astronauts by year of selection
- List of space travellers by first flight
- Amateur astronaut
- Commercial astronaut
- Spaceflight participant
- Space Tourism
- Sub-orbital spaceflight
- Orbital spaceflight
- List of orbital space travelers by company
- Lists of fictional astronauts

== Space flights ==
- List of human spaceflights, 1961–1970
- List of human spaceflights, 1971–1980
- List of human spaceflights, 1981–1990
- List of human spaceflights, 1991–2000
- List of human spaceflights, 2001–2010
- List of human spaceflights, 2011–2020
- List of human spaceflights, 2021–present
- List of Russian human spaceflight missions
- List of Soviet human spaceflight missions
- List of fully civilian crewed suborbital spaceflights
- List of fully civilian crewed orbital spaceflights

== See also ==
- Lists of astronomical objects
- Lists of telescopes
- Lists of spacecraft
- List of government space agencies
- Lists of space scientists
