= List of astronauts educated at Stanford University =

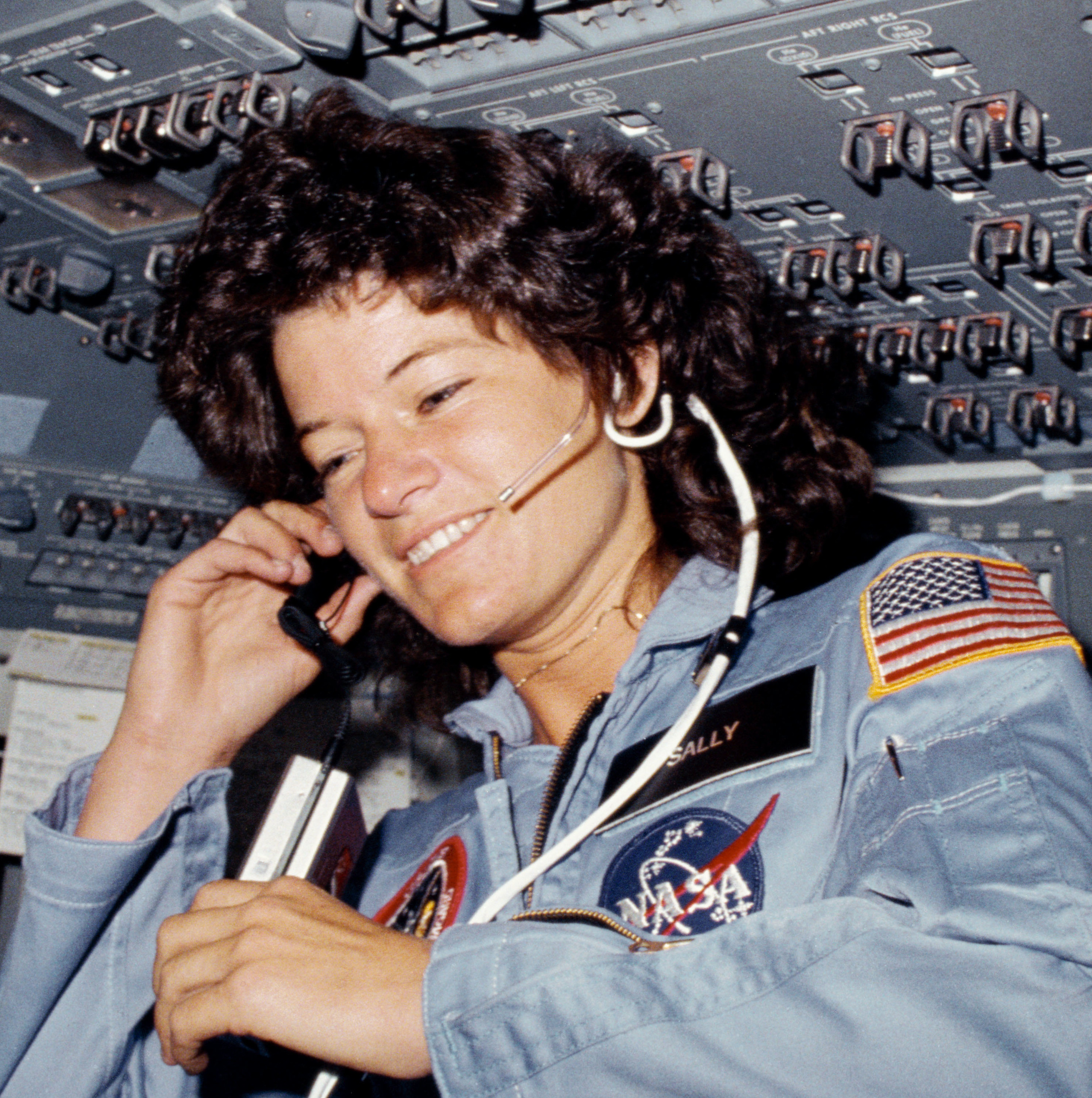
Sally Ride, the first American woman in space

As of 2026, twenty-seven United States astronauts are graduates of Stanford University, one of the highest numbers among civilian research universities. Stanford is a private university in Stanford, California, founded in 1885 by Leland and Jane Stanford. The Stanford University School of Engineering established the Department of Aeronautics and Astronautics in 1957 and has produced a large number of influential aerospace engineers at NASA throughout the Space Age. The university's proximity to NASA Ames Research Center in nearby Mountain View, California, has fostered close ties between Stanford researchers and the space program.

The first alumnus to fly in space was Owen Garriott, who launched aboard Skylab 3 on July 28, 1973. As of 2026, the most recent alumnus to be selected as an astronaut is Marcos Berríos in 2021 as part of NASA Astronaut Group 23. Stanford alumni have been part of the Skylab program, the Space Shuttle program, and the ongoing ISS program. The twenty-seven astronauts hold thirty-five degrees from Stanford, including five bachelor's degrees, seventeen master's degrees, ten doctorates, and two medical degrees, making Stanford one of the most represented universities in NASA's astronaut corps.

Stanford alumni include the first American woman in space (Sally Ride), the first untethered spacewalk (Bruce McCandless II), the first African-American woman in space (Mae Jemison), the first Hispanic woman in space (Ellen Ochoa), the first woman to pilot and command the Space Shuttle (Eileen Collins), the first sequencing of DNA in space (Kate Rubins), and the first Indigenous American woman in space (Nicole Mann).

In addition to 27 astronauts, Stanford has produced 58 Nobel Prize laureates, 33 MacArthur Fellows, 29 Turing Award recipients, and 196 Olympic medalists.

== List of astronauts ==
No.	Photograph	Name	Class Year	Degree	Notability	References
1		Owen Garriott	1957; 1960	M.S. and Ph.D. in Electrical Engineering	Science pilot on Skylab 3 (1973); mission specialist on STS-9 (Spacelab-1, 1983); first Stanford alumnus in space; spent 59 days aboard Skylab, a U.S. single-flight duration record at the time; performed all three Skylab 3 spacewalks; first person to operate amateur radio from orbit	
2		Bruce McCandless II	1965	M.S. in Electrical Engineering	Mission Specialist on STS-41-B (1984) and STS-31 (1990); performed the first untethered spacewalk using the Manned Maneuvering Unit on February 7, 1984; helped deploy the Hubble Space Telescope on STS-31	
3		William Fisher	1968	B.A. in Biological Sciences	Mission Specialist on STS-51-I (1985); conducted an 11-hour spacewalk to repair two Syncom communications satellites; physician	
4		John S. Bull	1971; 1973	M.S. and Ph.D. in Aeronautical Engineering	Selected for NASA Astronaut Group 5 in 1966; support crew for Apollo 8; named Lunar Module Pilot for LTA-8, but medically disqualified due to pulmonary disease; resigned from the astronaut corps in 1968 before flying in space; conducted simulation and flight test research at NASA Ames Research Center from 1973 to 1985	
5		Sally Ride	1973; 1975; 1978	B.S. in Physics, B.A. in English, M.S. and Ph.D. in Physics	Mission Specialist on STS-7 (1983) and STS-41-G (1984); first American woman and youngest American astronaut to fly in space (age 32); first LGBTQ+ person known to have flown in space; only person to serve on the investigation committees for both the Challenger and Columbia disasters	
6		Barbara Morgan	1973	B.A. in Human Biology	Mission Specialist on STS-118 (2007); backup to Christa McAuliffe for STS-51-L; NASA's first Educator Astronaut; first teacher to fly in space	
7		Mae Jemison	1977	B.S. in Chemical Engineering, B.A. in African and African-American studies	Mission Specialist on STS-47 (Spacelab-J, 1992); first African-American woman to travel to space; physician	
8		Tamara Jernigan	1981; 1985	B.S. in Physics and Astronomy, M.S. and Ph.D. in Astronomy	Mission Specialist on STS-40 (1991), STS-52 (1992), STS-67 (1995), STS-80 (1996), and STS-96 (1999); performed a spacewalk on STS-96 to transfer hardware to the International Space Station; associate director at Lawrence Livermore National Laboratory	
9		Ellen Ochoa	1981; 1985	M.S. and Ph.D. in Electrical Engineering	Mission Specialist on STS-56 (1993), STS-66 (1994), STS-96 (1999), and STS-110 (2002); first Hispanic woman to travel to space; logged nearly 1,000 hours in orbit; first Hispanic and second female director of Johnson Space Center	
10		Steve Smith	1981; 1982; 1987	B.S. and M.S. in Electrical Engineering, M.B.A.	Mission Specialist on STS-68 (1994), STS-82 (1997), and STS-103 (1999); performed five spacewalks totaling over 25 hours, primarily servicing the Hubble Space Telescope	
11		Peter Wisoff	1982; 1986	M.S. and Ph.D. in Applied Physics	Mission Specialist on STS-57 (1993), STS-68 (1994), STS-81 (1997), and STS-92 (2000); performed six spacewalks; principal associate director of Lawrence Livermore National Laboratory	
12		G. David Low	1983	M.S. in Aeronautics and Astronautics	Mission Specialist on STS-32 (1990), STS-43 (1991), and STS-57 (1993); performed a spacewalk on STS-57 to position antennae on a European communications satellite; son of George M. Low	
13		Scott Parazynski	1983; 1989	B.S. in Biological Sciences, M.D.	Mission Specialist on STS-66 (1994), STS-86 (1997), STS-95 (1998), STS-100 (2001), and STS-120 (2007); performed seven spacewalks; executed high-risk repair of a torn solar array on the ISS during STS-120; only person to both fly in space and summit Mount Everest	
14		Gregory Linteris	1984	M.S. in Mechanical Engineering	Payload specialist on STS-83 (1997) and STS-94 (1997); conducted microgravity combustion experiments aboard Spacelab; researcher at the National Institute of Standards and Technology	
15		Stephen Robinson	1985; 1991	M.S. and Ph.D. in Mechanical Engineering	Mission Specialist on STS-85 (1997), STS-95 (1998), STS-114 (2005), and STS-130 (2010); performed the first in-flight repair to the exterior of the Space Shuttle, removing protruding heat shield gap fillers while docked to the ISS on STS-114; professor at UC Davis	
16		Susan Helms	1985	M.S. in Aeronautics and Astronautics	Mission Specialist on STS-54 (1993), STS-64 (1994), STS-78 (1996), and STS-101 (2000); Flight Engineer on Expedition 2 (STS-102 / STS-105); set a then-record spacewalk duration of 8 hours 56 minutes in 2001; first woman to serve on a long-duration ISS expedition; Lieutenant General in the U.S. Air Force	
17		Eileen Collins	1986	M.S. in Operations Research	Pilot on STS-63 (1995) and STS-84 (1997); Commander on STS-93 (1999) and STS-114 (2005); first woman to pilot and first woman to command the Space Shuttle; STS-93 deployed the Chandra X-ray Observatory	
18		Ed Lu	1989	Ph.D. in Applied Physics	Mission Specialist on STS-84 (1997) and STS-106 (2000); Flight Engineer on Expedition 7 (Soyuz TMA-2, 2003); logged 206 days in space; co-founded the B612 Foundation to track and deflect asteroids	
19		E. Michael Fincke	1990	M.S. in Aeronautics and Astronautics	Flight Engineer and Science Officer on Expedition 9 (2004); Commander of Expedition 18 (2008–09); Mission Specialist on STS-134 (2011); Pilot on SpaceX Crew-11 (2025–26); held the American record for cumulative time in space (382 days) after his third mission	
20		Michael Hopkins	1992	M.S. in Aeronautics and Astronautics	Flight Engineer on Expedition 37/38 (2013–14); Commander of SpaceX Crew-1 (Expedition 64, 2020–21); logged 423 days in space; became the first member of the U.S. Space Force to serve in orbit after transferring from the Air Force while aboard the ISS in December 2020	
21		Mark Vande Hei	1999	M.S. in Applied Physics	Flight Engineer on Expedition 53/54 (2017–18) and Expedition 65/66 (2021–22); logged 523 days in space across two missions; broke the American single-spaceflight duration record with 355 consecutive days in orbit during Expedition 65/66; conducted four spacewalks totaling 26 hours 42 minutes; retired United States Army Colonel	
22		Nicole Mann	2001	M.S. in Mechanical Engineering	Commander of SpaceX Crew-5 (Expedition 68, 2022–23); first Indigenous American woman to travel to space; enrolled member of the Round Valley Indian Tribes; logged 157 days aboard the International Space Station; member of the Artemis program	
23		Anil Menon	2004; 2006	M.S. in Mechanical Engineering, M.D.	Flight Engineer on Expedition 75 (2026, scheduled); SpaceX's first flight surgeon, supporting SpaceX Demo-2 and Inspiration4; served as NASA flight surgeon for multiple ISS expeditions; United States Space Force Colonel; member of NASA Astronaut Group 23	
24		Kate Rubins	2006	Ph.D. in Cancer Biology	Flight Engineer on Expedition 48/49 (2016) and Expedition 64/65 (2020–21); first person to sequence DNA in space (2016); conducted four spacewalks totaling 24 hours; logged over 300 days in space; member of the Artemis program	
25		Jessica Watkins	2010	B.S. in Geology and Environmental Science	Mission Specialist on SpaceX Crew-4 (Expedition 67/68, 2022); first Black woman to serve on a long-duration spaceflight; geologist specializing in Mars surface science; member of NASA Astronaut Group 22 and the Artemis program	
26		Christopher Williams	2005	B.S. in Physics	Flight Engineer on Expedition 73/74 (Soyuz MS-28, 2025–26); first person of African descent to fly on a Soyuz spacecraft since Arnaldo Tamayo Méndez in 1980; clinical physicist and researcher at Brigham and Women's Hospital; member of NASA Astronaut Group 23	
27		Marcos Berríos	2008; 2010	M.S. in Mechanical Engineering, Ph.D. in Aeronautics and Astronautics	Astronaut candidate in NASA Astronaut Group 23 (selected 2021); United States Air Force test pilot; completed basic astronaut training in March 2024; first Puerto Rican-born astronaut	

== See also ==
- Stanford University
- NASA Astronaut Corps
- List of lists of astronauts educated by university
