= List of billionaire spacetravellers =

List of billionaire space travellers

This is a list of billionaire (USD) space travellers.

== List ==
Key
Color	Value
	Flown
	Currently in space
	Scheduled future flight

	Billionaire		Spaceflight	Launch Date	Arrival Date	Notes		Ref.
Dennis Tito	(United States) Dennis Tito	Dennis Tito, Talgat Musabayev, Yury Baturin, aboard the International Space Station	Space Adventures / MirCorp ISS EP-1 (Soyuz TM-32/TM-31)	28 April 2001	6 May 2001	First billionaire in space, orbital space; first space tourist to the International Space Station		
Dennis Tito	(South Africa) Mark Shuttleworth	Mark Shuttleworth aboard the International Space Station	Space Adventures ISS EP-3 (Soyuz TM-34/TM-33)	25 April 2002	2 May 2002	First insured space tourist; First South African, first person from Africa in space, orbital space; second space tourist to the International Space Station		
Charles Simonyi	(Hungary) Charles Simonyi		Space Adventures Soyuz TMA-10/TMA-9	7 April 2007	21 April 2007	First spaceflight	First two-time space tourist	
Charles Simonyi	(Hungary) Charles Simonyi		Space Adventures Soyuz TMA-13/TMA-12	26 March 2009	8 April 2009	Second spaceflight	First two-time space tourist	
Guy Laliberté	(Canada) Guy Laliberté		Space Adventures Soyuz TMA-16/TMA-14	30 September 2009	11 October 2009	First Canadian space tourist; Last space tourist before the U.S. STS Space Shuttle programme shut down, and increase in long-term ISS crew to 6, leading to a decade without space tourist flights to the ISS		
Richard Branson	(United Kingdom) Richard Branson		Virgin Galactic Unity 22	11 July 2021	11 July 2021	First billionaire to fly in his own spacecraft into space, above the 80km McDowell line to suborbital space; First fully occupied SpaceShipTwo flight		
Jeff Bezos	(United States) Jeff Bezos		Blue Origin NS-16	20 July 2021	20 July 2021	First billionaire to fly in his own spacecraft above the 100km Karman line into suborbital space; First wholly commercial civilian flightcrew-less flight into space, suborbital space; First crewed Blue Origin launch		
Jared Isaacman	(United States) Jared Isaacman (Note: In 2025, Isaacman was confirmed as Administrator of the National Aeronautics and Space Administration.)	(4)	SpaceX Shift4 Inspiration4	15 September 2021	18 September 2021	First wholly commercial civilian flightcrew-less flight into orbital space; Fourth crewed SpaceX launch		
Jared Isaacman	(United States) Jared Isaacman	(4)	SpaceX Polaris program Polaris Dawn	10 September 2024	15 September 2024	First flight from the Polaris program.		
Yusaku Maezawa	(Japan) Yusaku Maezawa	Maezawa, Misurking and Hirano, aboard the International Space Station	Space Adventures Soyuz MS-20	8 December 2021	20 December 2021	First spaceflight		
Larry Connor	(United States) Larry Connor	Crew from Ax-1 on board of the ISS.	Axiom/SpaceX Ax-1	08 April 2022	09 April 2022		First flight for AxiomSpace, first private spaceflight to the International Space Station	
Eytan Meir Stibbe	(Israel) Eytan Stibbe	Crew from Ax-1 on board of the ISS.	Axiom/SpaceX Ax-1	08 April 2022	09 April 2022		First flight for AxiomSpace, first private spaceflight to the International Space Station	First Israeli space tourist. Second Israeli in space, orbital space.
John Shoffner	(United States) John Shoffner	Crew from Ax-2 on board of the ISS.	Axiom/SpaceX Ax-2	21 May 2023	31 May 2023			
	(Malta) / (Saint Kitts and Nevis) (Note: Wang was born in China but lives primarily in Svalbard and since 2023 is also a citizen of Malta and Saint Kitts and Nevis through their golden visa programs. He will wear the flag of Malta on his spacesuit during the spaceflight.) Chun Wang		Fram2	1 April 2025	4 April 2025	First polar retrograde orbit human spaceflight mission, i.e., to fly over Earth's poles.		

== See also ==
- Billionaire space race
- List of billionaires
- List of astronauts
