= List of United States Space Force astronauts =

This is a complete list of astronauts in the United States Space Force. There have currently been three NASA astronauts who have been members of the U.S. Space Force. The first U.S. Space Force astronaut, Colonel Mike Hopkins, commemorated the service's first birthday by having his transfer ceremony on 19 December 2020 on the International Space Station.

== List of astronauts ==
No.	Portrait	Name	Astronaut group	Spaceflights	Alma mater	Ref
1		Colonel; Michael S. Hopkins	NASA Astronaut Group 20	Soyuz TMA-10M (Expedition 37/Expedition 38); SpaceX Crew-1 (Expedition 64/Expedition 65)	University of Illinois (Bachelor of Science in Aerospace Engineering) Stanford University (Master of Science in Aerospace Engineering)	
2		Brigadier General; Nick Hague	NASA Astronaut Group 21	Soyuz MS-10; Soyuz MS-12 (Expedition 59/Expedition 60); SpaceX Crew-9 (Expedition 72)	United States Air Force Academy (Bachelor of Science in Astronautical Engineering); Massachusetts Institute of Technology (Master of Science in Aeronautical and Astronautical Engineering)	
3		Colonel; Anil Menon	NASA Astronaut Group 23	Soyuz MS-29 (Expedition 74)	Harvard University (BS); Stanford University (MS, MD); University of Texas Medical Branch	

== See also ==
- NASA Astronaut Corps
- List of United States Marine Corps astronauts
