= List of astronauts educated at the Massachusetts Institute of Technology =

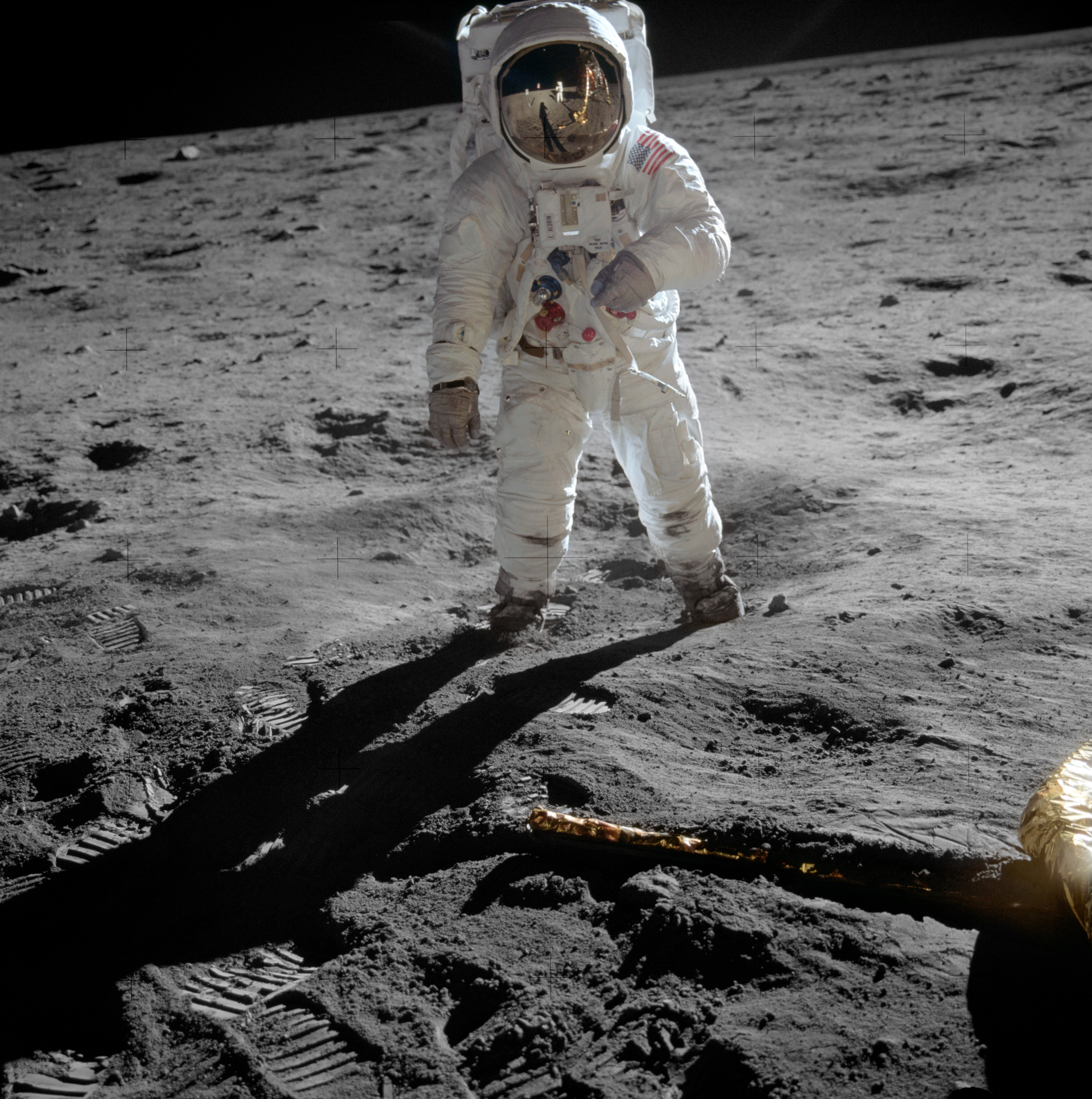
Buzz Aldrin on the moon, 1969

As of 2026, forty-four alumni of the Massachusetts Institute of Technology (MIT) have been selected as NASA astronauts, more than any other non-military university. Two additional alumni have flown for the European Space Agency (ESA) and China National Space Administration (CNSA). A total of 51 people affiliated with MIT as students, faculty, or researchers have flown to space.

MIT is a private research university in Cambridge, Massachusetts, founded in 1861. Its Department of Aeronautics and Astronautics (Course 16) was established in 1914. In 1962, the Man-Vehicle Laboratory (renamed the Human Systems Laboratory in 2018) was established to study the physiological and cognitive limitations of pilots and astronauts in space vehicles, and has trained many of the Institute's astronauts. The Space Systems Laboratory, established in 1995, develops small spacecraft, precision optical systems, and International Space Station technology.

The first MIT alumnus to fly in space was David Scott, who flew aboard Gemini 8 in 1966. The best known is Buzz Aldrin (Sc.D. 1963), the lunar module pilot of Apollo 11 and the second person to walk on the Moon. As of 2026, the most recent alumna to be selected as an astronaut was Christina Birch, of the class of 2015. As of 2007, among all U.S. universities, only the United States Naval Academy had produced more astronauts.

== Astronauts ==
No.	Photograph	Name	Class Year	Degree	Notability	References
1		Russell Schweickart	1956; 1963	S.B. and S.M. in Aeronautics and Astronautics	Lunar module pilot on Apollo 9 (1969); performed the first crewed flight test of the Apollo Lunar Module	
2		Laurence Young	1959; 1962	S.B. and S.M. in Electrical Engineering (1959); Sc.D. in Instrumentation (1962)	Backup (alternate) payload specialist for STS-58 (1993) but never flew; Apollo Program Professor of Astronautics and co-founder of the Man-Vehicle Laboratory	
3		William Lenoir	1961; 1962; 1965	S.B., S.M., and Ph.D. in Electrical Engineering	Mission specialist on STS-5 (1982); later NASA Associate Administrator for Space Flight	
4		David Scott	1962	S.M. and Engineer in Aeronautics and Astronautics	Pilot on Gemini 8 (1966); command module pilot on Apollo 9 (1969); commander of Apollo 15 (1971); seventh person to walk on the Moon	
5		Buzz Aldrin	1963	Sc.D. in Astronautics	Lunar module pilot on Apollo 11 (1969); second person to walk on the Moon; also flew on Gemini 12	
6		Philip Chapman	1964; 1967	S.M. (1964) and Sc.D. (1967) in Aeronautics and Astronautics	Scientist-astronaut in NASA Astronaut Group 6 (1967); Australian-born; resigned in 1972 without flying in space	
7		Charles Duke	1964	S.M. in Aeronautics and Astronautics	Lunar module pilot on Apollo 16 (1972); tenth person to walk on the Moon; CAPCOM for Apollo 11	
8		Edgar Mitchell	1964	Sc.D. in Aeronautics and Astronautics	Lunar module pilot on Apollo 14 (1971); sixth person to walk on the Moon	
9		Anthony England	1965; 1970	S.B. and S.M. in Geology (1965); Ph.D. in Geophysics (1970)	Mission specialist on STS-51-F (Spacelab-2, 1985); scientist-astronaut; support crew for Apollo 13 and 16	
10		Frederick Hauck	1966	S.M. in Nuclear Engineering	Pilot on STS-7 (1983); commander of STS-51-A (1984) and STS-26 (1988), the first flight after the Challenger disaster	
11		Terry Hart	1969	S.M. in Mechanical Engineering	Mission specialist on STS-41-C (1984); U.S. Air Force pilot; later professor at Lehigh University	
12		Byron Lichtenberg	1975; 1979	S.M. in Mechanical Engineering; Sc.D. in Biomedical Engineering	Payload specialist on STS-9 (Spacelab-1, 1983) and STS-45 (1992); America's first payload specialist	
13		Jerome Apt	1976	Ph.D. in Physics	Mission specialist on STS-37 (1991), STS-47 (1992), STS-59 (1994), and STS-79 (1996); later professor at Carnegie Mellon University	
14		Franklin Chang-Díaz	1977	Sc.D. in Applied Plasma Physics	Veteran of seven Space Shuttle missions (1986–2002); first Latin American–born NASA astronaut; tied the record for most spaceflights (seven); founder of Ad Astra Rocket Company	
15		Ronald McNair	1977	Ph.D. in Physics	Mission specialist on STS-41-B (1984); died in the Space Shuttle Challenger disaster (STS-51-L, 1986); second African American in space	
16		Albert Sacco	1977	Ph.D. in Chemical Engineering	Payload specialist on STS-73 (USML-2, 1995); chemical engineer and academic administrator	
17		Janice Voss	1977; 1987	S.M. in Electrical Engineering; Ph.D. in Aeronautics and Astronautics	Mission specialist on STS-57 (1993), STS-63 (1995), STS-83 (1997), STS-94 (1997), and STS-99 (2000)	
18		Kenneth D. Cameron	1978; 1979	S.B. and S.M. in Aeronautics and Astronautics	Pilot on STS-37 (1991); commander of STS-56 (1993) and STS-74 (1995)	
19		William Shepherd	1978	Ocean Engineer's degree and S.M. in Mechanical Engineering	Mission specialist on STS-27 (1988), STS-41 (1990), and STS-52 (1992); first commander of the International Space Station (Expedition 1, 2000–01); Navy SEAL	
20		Robert Thirsk	1978; 1998	S.M. in Mechanical Engineering; M.B.A. (Sloan)	Canadian Space Agency astronaut; mission specialist on STS-78 (1996); flight engineer on Expedition 20/21 (2009); first Canadian on a long-duration spaceflight	
21		John Grunsfeld	1980	S.B. in Physics	Veteran of five Space Shuttle missions; performed spacewalks servicing the Hubble Space Telescope ("Hubble Repairman"); later NASA Associate Administrator for Science	
22		Mark Lee	1980	S.M. in Mechanical Engineering	Mission specialist on STS-30 (1989), STS-47 (1992), STS-64 (1994), and STS-82 (1997); performed an untethered spacewalk testing the SAFER unit	
23		Catherine Coleman	1983	S.B. in Chemistry	Mission specialist on STS-73 (1995) and STS-93 (1999); flight engineer on Expedition 26/27 (2010–11)	
24		Pamela Melroy	1984	S.M. in Earth, Atmospheric and Planetary Sciences	Pilot on STS-92 (2000) and STS-112 (2002); commander of STS-120 (2007); one of two women to command a Space Shuttle; later NASA Deputy Administrator	
25		Heidemarie Stefanyshyn-Piper	1984; 1985	S.B. and S.M. in Mechanical Engineering	Mission specialist on STS-115 (2006) and STS-126 (2008); U.S. Navy salvage officer; performed five spacewalks	
26		Daniel Tani	1984; 1988	S.B. and S.M. in Mechanical Engineering	Mission specialist on STS-108 (2001); flight engineer on Expedition 16 (2007–08); performed six spacewalks	
27		Neil Woodward	1984	S.B. in Physics	Astronaut candidate in NASA Astronaut Group 17 (1998); U.S. Navy officer; did not fly in space	
28		Robert Satcher	1986; 1993	S.B. and Ph.D. in Chemical Engineering	Mission specialist on STS-129 (2009); orthopedic surgeon and chemical engineer; first orthopedic surgeon in space	
29		Wendy Lawrence	1988	S.M. in Ocean Engineering	Mission specialist on STS-67 (1995), STS-86 (1997), STS-91 (1998), and STS-114 (2005); U.S. Navy helicopter pilot	
30		Michael Massimino	1988; 1990; 1992	S.M. in Mechanical Engineering and S.M. in Technology and Policy (1988); Engineer's degree (1990) and Ph.D. (1992) in Mechanical Engineering	Mission specialist on STS-109 (2002) and STS-125 (2009); serviced the Hubble Space Telescope; first person to post to social media from space	
31		Dominic Antonelli	1989	S.B. in Aeronautics and Astronautics	Pilot on STS-119 (2009) and STS-132 (2010); U.S. Navy test pilot	
32		Michael Fincke	1989	S.B. in Aeronautics and Astronautics and in Earth, Atmospheric and Planetary Sciences	Commander of Expedition 18 (2008–09); mission specialist on STS-134 (2011); pilot on SpaceX Crew-11 (2025–26); once held the American record for cumulative time in space	
33		Nicholas Patrick	1990; 1996	S.M. and Ph.D. in Mechanical Engineering	Mission specialist on STS-116 (2006) and STS-130 (2010); performed three spacewalks	
34		Gregory Chamitoff	1992	Ph.D. in Aeronautics and Astronautics	Flight engineer on Expedition 17/18 (2008); mission specialist on STS-134 (2011)	
35		Timothy Creamer	1992	S.M. in Physics	Flight engineer on Expedition 22/23 (2009–10); U.S. Army officer	
36		Stephen Bowen	1993	Ocean Engineer's degree and S.M. in Ocean Engineering	Mission specialist on STS-126 (2008), STS-132 (2010), and STS-133 (2011); commander of SpaceX Crew-6 (2023); first submariner to fly in space	
37		Jack Fischer	1998	S.M. in Aeronautics and Astronautics	Flight engineer on Expedition 51/52 (2017); U.S. Air Force test pilot	
38		Christopher Cassidy	2000	S.M. in Ocean Engineering	Mission specialist on STS-127 (2009); flight engineer on Expedition 35/36 (2013) and commander of Expedition 63 (2020); former Chief of the Astronaut Office; Navy SEAL	
39		Nick Hague	2000	S.M. in Aeronautics and Astronautics	Survived the Soyuz MS-10 launch abort (2018); flight engineer on Expedition 59/60 (2019); commander of SpaceX Crew-9 (2024–25); U.S. Space Force officer	
40		Raja Chari	2001	S.M. in Aeronautics and Astronautics	Commander of SpaceX Crew-3 (Expedition 66, 2021–22); U.S. Air Force test pilot; member of the Artemis program	
41		Sophie Adenot	2004	S.M. in Aeronautics and Astronautics	European Space Agency astronaut (selected 2022); French Air and Space Force test pilot; graduate student in the MIT Man-Vehicle Laboratory, 2002–04	
42		Jasmin Moghbeli	2005	S.B. in Aeronautics and Astronautics	Commander of SpaceX Crew-7 (Expedition 70, 2023–24); U.S. Marine Corps test pilot	
43		Marcos Berríos	2006	S.B. in Mechanical Engineering	Astronaut candidate in NASA Astronaut Group 23 (2021); U.S. Air Force test pilot; first Puerto Rican-born astronaut	
44		Warren Hoburg	2008	S.B. in Aeronautics and Astronautics	Pilot on SpaceX Crew-6 (Expedition 69, 2023); former MIT assistant professor of aeronautics and astronautics	
45		Christopher Williams	2012	Ph.D. in Physics	Flight engineer on Expedition 73/74 (Soyuz MS-28, 2025–26); clinical physicist; member of NASA Astronaut Group 23	
46		Christina Birch	2015	Ph.D. in Biological Engineering	Astronaut candidate in NASA Astronaut Group 23 (2021); bioengineer and former competitive track cyclist	

== Commercial astronauts ==
Three MIT alumni have flown as commercial (private) astronauts or test pilots.

No.	Photograph	Name	Class Year	Degree	Notability	References
1		Keith Colmer	1989	S.B. in Aeronautics and Astronautics	U.S. Air Force F-16 test pilot; piloted VSS Enterprise on the GF-21 suborbital test flight; later vice president at Gulfstream Aerospace	
2		Emily Calandrelli	2013	S.M. in Aeronautics and Astronautics and S.M. in Technology and Policy	Science communicator and television host ("The Space Gal"); flew on the suborbital Blue Origin NS-28 mission (2024), becoming the 100th woman to fly in space	
3		Jameel Janjua	2014	S.M. in Aeronautics and Astronautics	Piloted VSS Unity to the edge of space at Mach 2.96 for the suborbital Galactic 07 mission (2024), becoming the first Canadian to pilot a commercial spaceflight	

== Affiliated astronauts ==
Two NASA astronauts have been affiliated with MIT as faculty or postdoctoral researchers rather than as degree recipients.

No.	Photograph	Name	Affiliation with MIT	Notability	References
1		Stephen Robinson	Postdoctoral fellow, Man-Vehicle Laboratory (1993–94)	Mission specialist on STS-85 (1997), STS-95 (1998), STS-114 (2005), and STS-130 (2010); performed the first in-flight repair of a Space Shuttle's exterior	
2		Jeffrey Hoffman	Professor of the Practice, Aeronautics and Astronautics; Director, Human Systems Laboratory (2002–present)	Mission specialist on STS-51-D (1985), STS-35 (1990), STS-46 (1992), STS-61 (1993), and STS-75 (1996); first astronaut to log 1,000 hours aboard the Space Shuttle	

== See also ==
- Space Systems Laboratory (MIT)
- NASA Astronaut Corps
- List of Massachusetts Institute of Technology alumni
