= Lists of space scientists =

This is a list of lists of space scientists.

- List of cosmologists
- List of aerospace engineers
- List of women astronomers
- List of astronomers
- List of French astronomers
- List of minor planet discoverers
- List of Russian astronomers and astrophysicists
- List of Russian aerospace engineers
- List of Germans relocated to the US via the Operation Paperclip

== See also ==
- Astronomer Royal
- Lists of astronomical objects
- Lists of telescopes
- Lists of spacecraft
- SEDS
- List of government space agencies
- Lists of astronauts
