= List of United States Marine Corps astronauts =

This is a partial list of United States Marine Corps members who have served as NASA astronauts (the era of Soyuz astronauts after the end of Space Shuttle era is excluded).

== Project Mercury ==
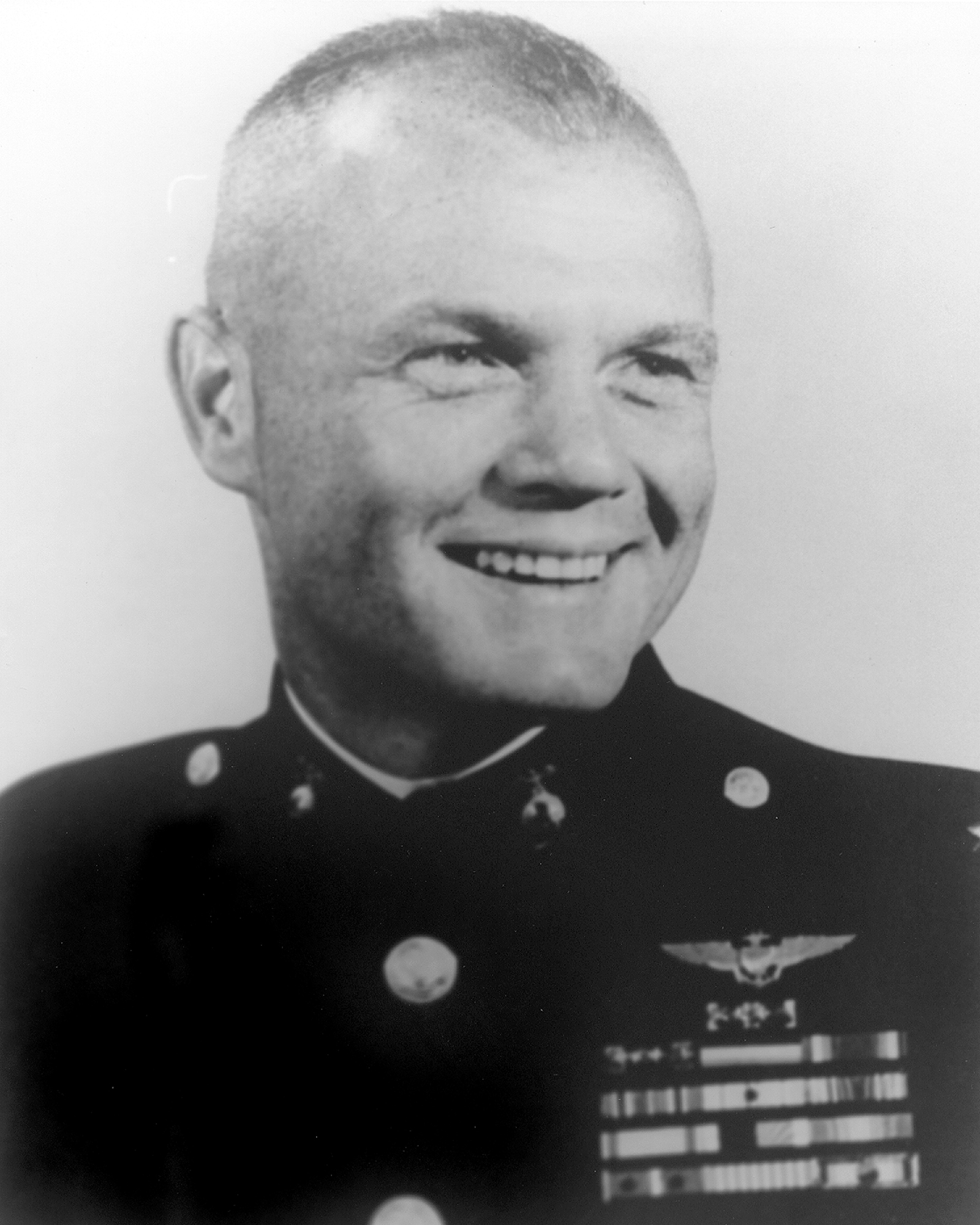
Col. John Glenn, the first Marine astronaut

Project Mercury (1959–1963) was the first human spaceflight program of the United States. It ran from 1959 through 1963 with the goal of putting a human in orbit around the Earth. The Mercury-Atlas 6 flight on 20 February 1962, piloted by Lieutenant Colonel John Glenn, was the first Mercury flight to achieve this goal. Glenn was the only Marine to fly in the Mercury program, and also flew aboard the Space Shuttle Discovery in 1998. USAF astronaut Gordon Cooper was a former Marine, having previously served as an enlisted Infantryman before receiving his Air Force commission.

== Apollo program ==
The Apollo program was a NASA spaceflight endeavor that landed the first humans on the Moon. It set major milestones in human spaceflight and stands alone in sending crewed missions beyond low Earth orbit. The Apollo program ran from 1961 until 1975, and was the U.S. civilian space agency's third human spaceflight program (following Project Mercury and Project Gemini). The program used Apollo spacecraft and Saturn launch vehicles, which were later used for the Skylab program and the joint American-Soviet Apollo-Soyuz Test Project. U.S. Marines who were astronauts in the Apollo program are:

- R. Walter Cunningham (Apollo 7 - Colonel, USMC Reserve, retired)
- Fred W. Haise, Jr. (Apollo 13 - USMC 1952–1956, later Captain, Oklahoma Air National Guard)
- Jack R. Lousma (Skylab 3 - Colonel, USMC, retired)
- Gerald P. Carr (Skylab 4 - Colonel, USMC, retired)
- Vance D. Brand (Apollo-Soyuz Test Project, Command Module Pilot) - USMC 1953–1957, USMC Reserve, Air National Guard until 1966 (Marine rank not listed)
- F. Story Musgrave (Skylab 2 Backup Crew - former enlisted Marine, discharged as Staff Sergeant)

== Space Shuttle program ==
NASA's Space Shuttle, officially called the Space Transportation System (STS), was the United States government's crewed launch vehicle until its retirement in 2011. The winged Space Shuttle orbiter was launched vertically, usually carrying five to seven astronauts (eight have been carried) and up to 50,000 lb (22 700 kg) of payload into low Earth orbit. When its mission is complete, the shuttle could independently move itself out of orbit and re-enter the Earth's atmosphere. U.S. Marines who have been astronauts in the Space Shuttle program are:

- Fred W. Haise, Jr. (ALT program)
- Jack R. Lousma (STS-3)
- Vance D. Brand (STS-5, STS-41-B, STS-35)
- Robert F. Overmyer (STS-5, STS-51-B)
- F. Story Musgrave (STS-6, STS-51-F, STS-33, STS-44, STS-61, STS-80 - former enlisted Marine, discharged as Staff Sergeant)
- David C. Hilmers (STS-51-J, STS-26, STS-36, STS-42)
- James F. Buchli (STS-51-C, STS-61-A, STS-29, STS-48)
- Bryan D. O'Connor (STS-61-B, STS-40)
- Charles F. Bolden, Jr. (STS-61-C, STS-31, STS-45, STS-60) - Bolden served as the Administrator of NASA from 2009 to 2017.
- Robert D. Cabana (STS-41, STS-53, STS-65, STS-88) - Cabana served as the Associate Administrator of the National Aeronautics and Space Administration
- Robert C. Springer (STS-29, STS-38)
- Kenneth D. Cameron (STS-37, STS-56, STS-74)
- Andrew M. Allen (STS-46, STS-62, STS-75)
- Terrence W. Wilcutt (STS-68, STS-79, STS-89, STS-106)
- Carlos I. Noriega (STS-84, STS-97)
- Frederick W. Sturckow (STS-88, STS-105, STS-117, STS-128)
- Charles O. Hobaugh (STS-104, STS-118, STS-129)
- Joseph M. Acaba (STS-119, Soyuz TMA-04M, Expedition 31, Expedition 32) - USMC Reserve, Sergeant
- George D. Zamka (STS-120, STS-130)
- Douglas G. Hurley (STS-127, STS-135)
- Randolph J. Bresnik (STS-129)

== Commercial Crew Program ==
- Doug Hurley (SpaceX Demo-2)
- Nicole Aunapu Mann (SpaceX Crew-5)
- Jasmin Moghbeli (SpaceX Crew-7)

== See also ==
- List of famous U.S. Marines
- List of historically important U.S. Marines
- Space marine
