= List of astronauts educated at the University of Kansas =

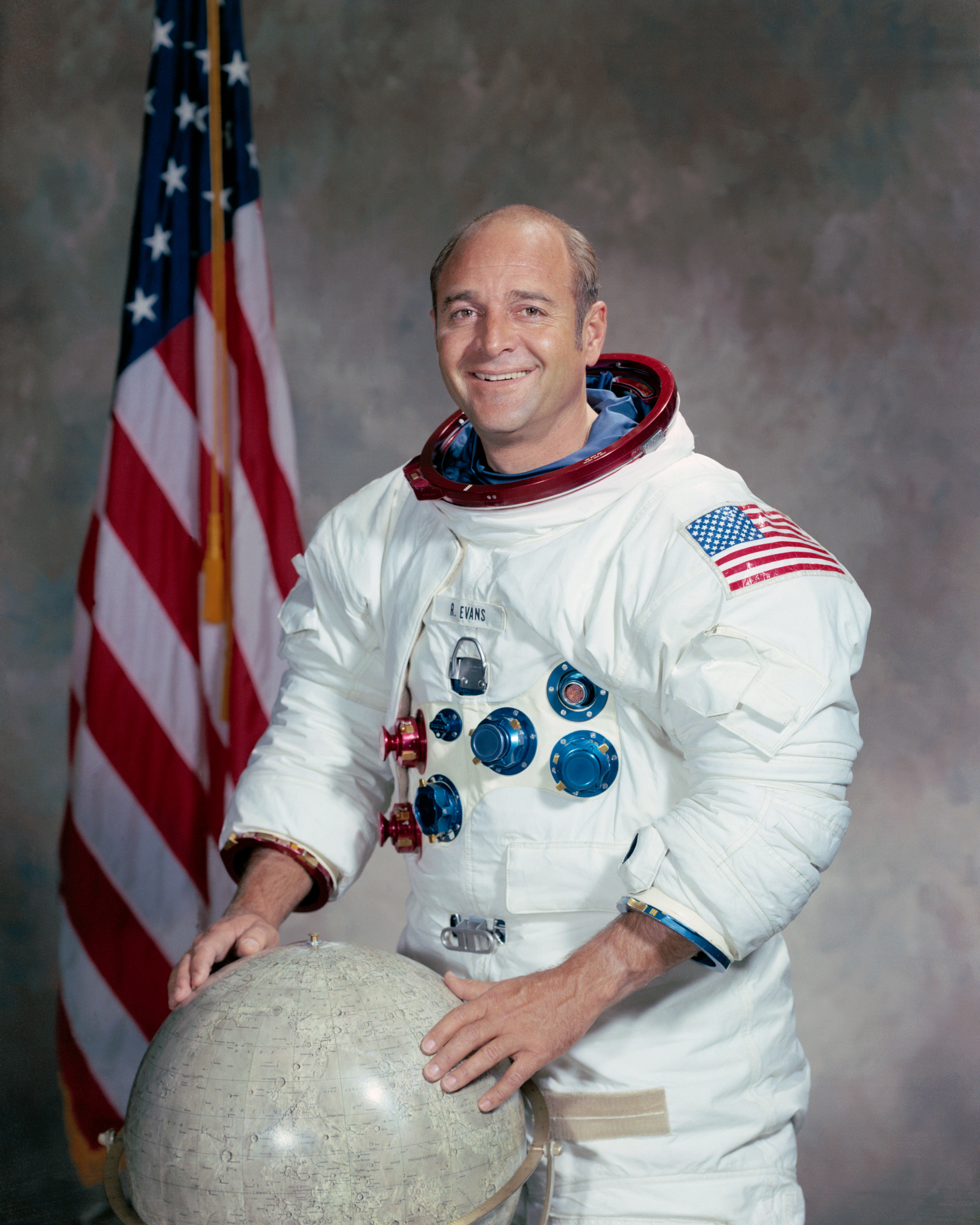
Apollo 11 astronaut Ron Evans in 1971

As of 2026, four United States astronauts have graduated from the University of Kansas (KU). Five alumni of the university have flown to space, including a commercial astronaut. The University of Kansas is a public university in Lawrence, Kansas, and the flagship school of the state of Kansas. The University of Kansas School of Engineering was founded in 1891.

This list is drawn from graduates of KU who became astronauts. The university was founded in 1865 and graduated its first class in 1873. The first alumnus to fly as an astronaut was Joe Engle, who piloted the X-15 rocket plane to space on several flights, starting in 1965 and later served as commander on the second flight of the Space Shuttle, STS-2, and on STS-51-I. As of 2026, the most recent alumna to fly to space was Laura Stiles of the class of 2008 on a Blue Origin New Shepard launch.

In addition to four astronauts, university alumni include 325 Fulbright Scholars, 27 Rhodes Scholars, 10 Marshall Scholars, 12 MacArthur Fellows, 7 Pulitzer Prize winners, and 2 Nobel Prize laureates.

== Astronauts ==
Name	Class year	Notability	Reference
Joe Engle	1955	X-15 pilot; STS-2 and STS-51-I Shuttle mission commander	
Ronald Evans	1956	Command module pilot on Apollo 17. Longest time in lunar orbit (6 days, 4 hours) and greatest number of lunar orbits (75).	
Steven Hawley	1973	Served as a mission specialist on STS-41D in 1984, STS-61C in 1986, STS-31 in 1990, STS-82 in 1997 and STS-93 in 1999. Later KU Professor of Physics & Astronomy	
Loral O'Hara	2005	Flew on board Soyuz MS-23 as part of Expedition 68 to the International Space Station	

== Commercial astronauts ==
Name	Class year	Notability	Reference
Laura Stiles	2008	Flew on New Shepard 4 as crew member on Blue Origin NS-38	

== See also ==
- University of Kansas
- University of Kansas School of Engineering
