= List of orbital space travelers by company =

This list of space travelers is grouped by companies involved in their participation in spaceflights.

== Axiom Space ==
- Larry Connor – space tourist
- Eytan Stibbe – space tourist
- Michael López-Alegría – astronaut
- Mark Pathy – space tourist
- Peggy Whitson – astronaut
- John Shoffner – space tourist
- Ali AlQarni – astronaut
- Rayyanah Barnawi – astronaut
- Walter Villadei - spationaut
- Marcus Wandt - astronaut
- Alper Gezeravcı - astronaut

== Boeing ==
- Barry Wilmore – astronaut
- Sunita Williams – astronaut

== Scaled Composites ==
- Brian Binnie – commercial astronaut
- Mike Melvill – commercial astronaut
- Peter Siebold – commercial astronaut

== SpaceX ==
- Akihiko Hoshide – astronaut
- Bob Behnken – astronaut
- Doug Hurley – astronaut
- K. McArthur – astronaut
- Kayla Barron – astronaut
- Matthias Maurer – astronaut
- Michael López-Alegría – astronaut
- Mike Hopkins – astronaut
- Raja Chari – astronaut
- Robert Kimbrough – astronaut
- Shannon Walker – astronaut
- Soichi Noguchi – astronaut
- Thomas Marshburn – astronaut
- Thomas Pesquet – spationaut
- Victor Glover – astronaut
- Jared Isaacman – space tourist
- Sian Proctor – space tourist
- Hayley Arceneaux – space tourist
- Christopher Sembroski – space tourist
- Matthias Maurer – astronaut
- Kayla Barron – astronaut
- Raja Chari – astronaut
- Thomas Marshburn – astronaut
- Robert Hines – astronaut
- Kjell N. Lindgren – astronaut
- Jessica Watkins – astronaut
- Samantha Cristoforetti – astronaut
- Nicole Mann - astronaut
- Josh Cassada - astronaut
- Koichi Wakata - astronaut
- Anna Kikina - cosmonaut
- Stephen Bowen - astronaut
- Warren Hoburg - astronaut
- Sultan Al Neyadi - astronaut
- Andrey Fedyaev - astronaut
- Jasmin Moghbeli - astronaut
- Andreas Mogensen - astronaut
- Satoshi Furukawa - astronaut
- Matthew Dominick - astronaut
- Konstantin Borisov - cosmonaut
- Michael Barratt - astronaut
- Jeanette Epps - astronaut
- Alexander Grebenkin - cosmonaut
- Sunita Williams - astronaut
- Barry E. Wilmore - astronaut
- Scott Poteet - astronaut
- Sarah Gillis - astronaut
- Anna Menon - astronaut
- Nick Hague - astronaut
- Aleksandr Gorbunov - astronaut
- Anne McClain - astronaut
- Nichole Ayers - astronaut
- Takuya Onishi - astronaut
- Kirill Peskov - cosmonaut
- Chun Wang - astronaut
- Jannicke Mikkelsen - astronaut
- Eric Phillips - astronaut
- Rabea Rogge - astronaut
- Sławosz Uznański-Wiśniewski - astronaut
- Tibor Kapu - astronaut
- Shubhanshu Shukla - astronaut
- Zena Cardman - astronaut
- Kimiya Yui - astronaut
- Michael Fincke - astronaut
- Oleg Platonov - cosmonaut
