= List of Polish astronauts =

The following is a list of Polish astronauts who have traveled into space, sorted by date of first flight.

Prior to 1989, the usual term for space explorers in Poland (then the Polish People's Republic or PRL) was kosmonauta (cosmonaut) due to the country's membership in the Eastern Bloc and its reliance on the Soviet space program. Following the regime change and Poland's shift to a closer relationship with Western organisations (including NATO and EU membership), the term astronauta (astronaut) became the new standard.

As of 2025, two Polish nationals have been to space. The first Polish citizen in space was Mirosław Hermaszewski on Soyuz 30 in 1978. Sławosz Uznański-Wiśniewski became the second Polish national in space after he launched on Crew Dragon Grace for Axiom Mission 4 in June 2025. Uznański-Wiśniewski is also the first Polish national to visit the International Space Station.

== List ==
Image	Name	Mission	Mission Insignia	Mission start	Mission duration	Space station	Mission objectives	Ref.
	Mirosław Hermaszewski (1941–2022)	Soyuz 30		27 June 1978	7d 22h 02m 59s	Salyut 6	Interkosmos space program	
	Sławosz Uznański-Wiśniewski (1984–)	Axiom Mission 4		25 June 2025	20d 2h 59m	ISS	Ignis	

== See also ==
- Polish Space Agency
