= SpaceX Crew-5 =

2022 American crewed spaceflight to the ISS

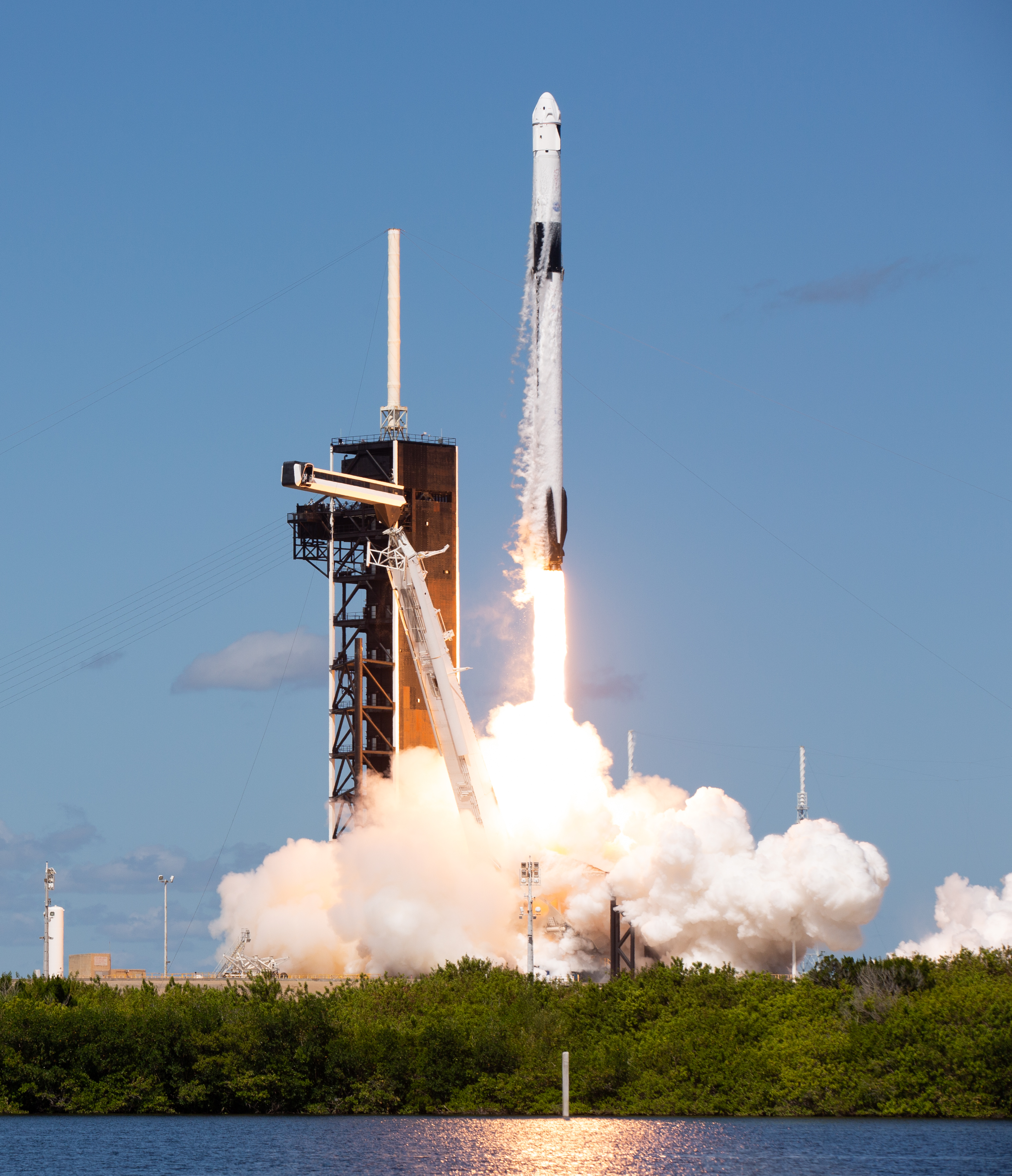
- Endurance launches to the ISS with Crew-5 onboard
- Names: USCV-5
- Mission type: ISS crew transport
- Operator: SpaceX
- COSPAR ID: 2022-124A
- SATCAT no.: 53963
- Mission duration: 157 days, 10 hours, 1 minute

Spacecraft properties
- Spacecraft: Crew Dragon Endurance
- Spacecraft type: Crew Dragon
- Manufacturer: SpaceX
- Launch mass: 12,519 kg (27,600 lb)
- Landing mass: 9,616 kg (21,200 lb)

Crew
- Crew size: 4
- Members: Nicole Mann; Josh Cassada; Koichi Wakata; Anna Kikina
- Expedition: Expedition 68

Start of mission
- Launch date: October 5, 2022, 16:00:57 UTC (12:00:57 pm EDT)
- Rocket: Falcon 9 Block 5 B1077-1
- Launch site: Kennedy, LC‑39A

End of mission
- Recovered by: MV Shannon
- Landing date: March 12, 2023, 02:02 UTC (9:02 pm EST)
- Landing site: Gulf of Mexico, near Clearwater, Florida

Orbital parameters
- Reference system: Geocentric orbit
- Regime: Low Earth orbit
- Inclination: 51.68°

Docking with ISS
- Docking port: Harmony forward
- Docking date: October 6, 2022, 21:01 UTC
- Undocking date: March 11, 2023, 07:20 UTC
- Time docked: 155 days, 10 hours, 19 minutes
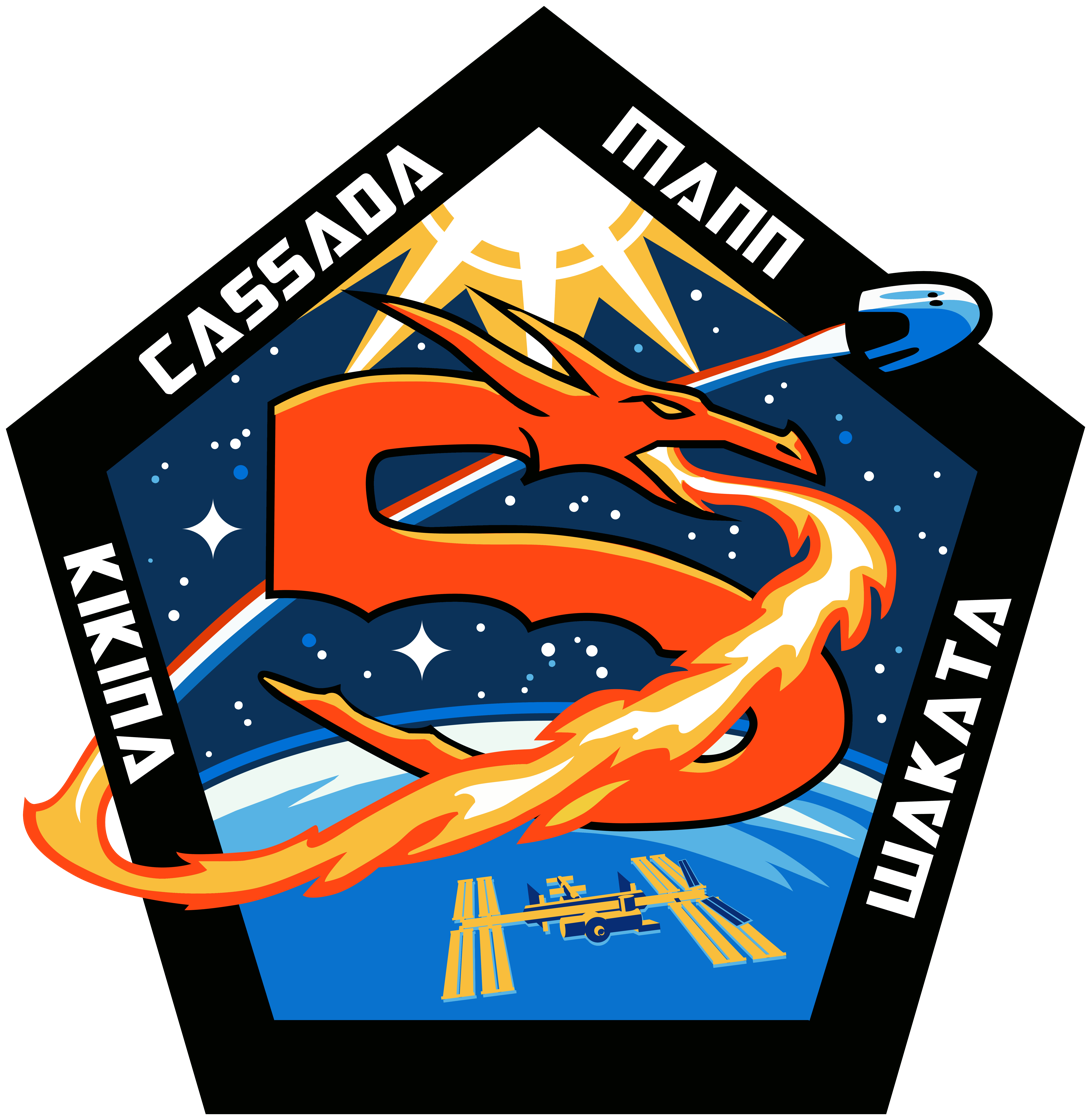
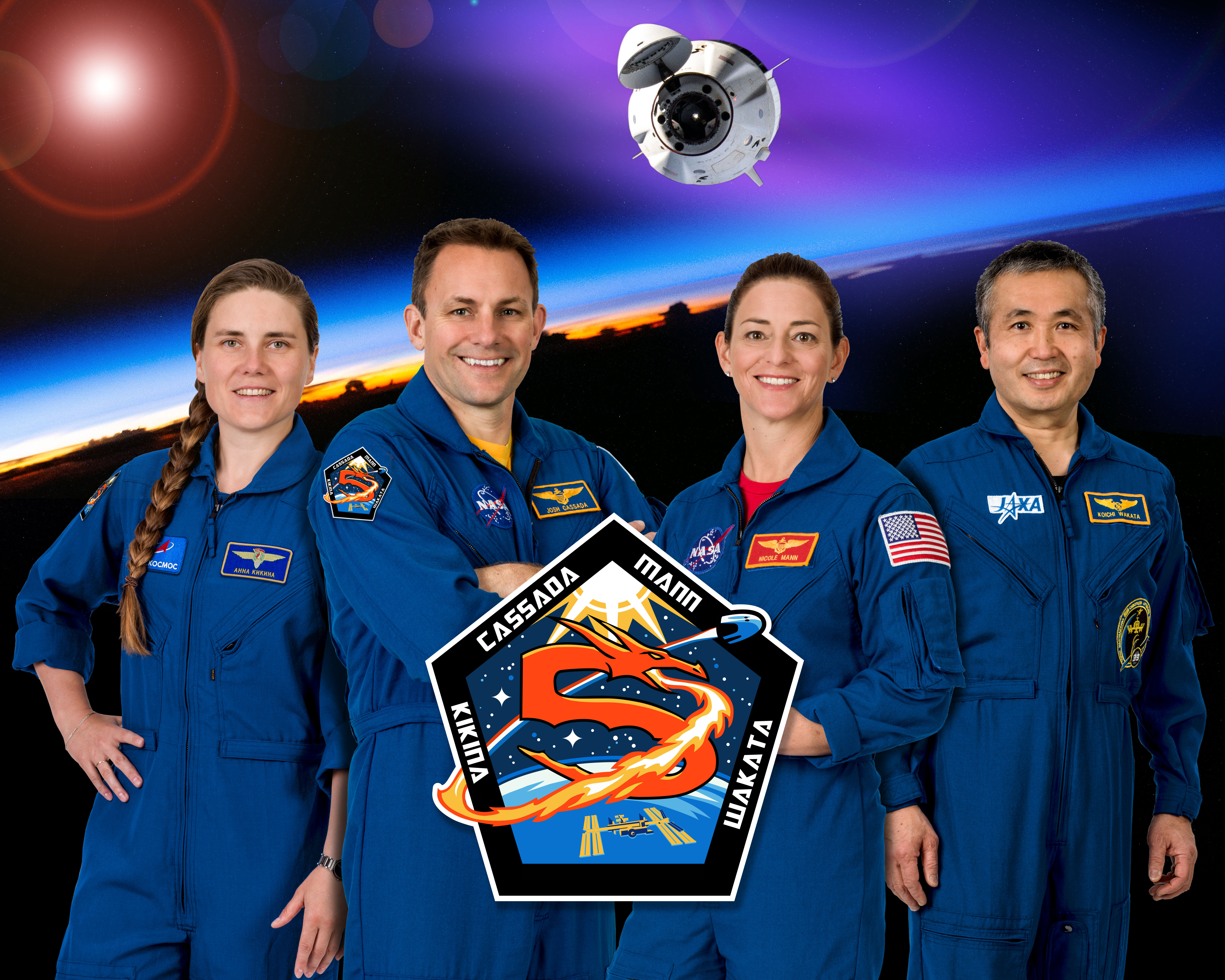
- Mission patch From left: Kikina, Cassada, Mann and Wakata Commercial Crew Program Crew Dragon flights

SpaceX Crew-5 was the fifth operational NASA Commercial Crew Program flight of a Crew Dragon spacecraft, and the eighth overall crewed orbital flight. The mission was successfully launched on October 5, 2022, with the aim of transporting four crew members to the International Space Station (ISS). The Crew Dragon spacecraft docked at the ISS on October 6, 2022, at 21:01 UTC.

The crew for this mission comprised two NASA astronauts, one JAXA astronaut, and one Russian cosmonaut. Three of the crew members were assigned to this mission due to delays in Boeing's Starliner program. Commander Nicole Mann was reassigned from Boeing's Boe-CFT mission, while pilot Josh Cassada and mission specialist Koichi Wakata transferred from Boeing Starliner-1. Anna Kikina was reassigned from Soyuz MS-22.

Among the crew members, three were embarking on their first spaceflight, while mission specialist Koichi Wakata is a veteran of four previous spaceflights.

== Crew ==
This mission marked a significant milestone as it was the first time a Russian cosmonaut, Anna Kikina, flew aboard a Crew Dragon spacecraft. In July 2022, Kikina was selected to participate in the mission as part of the Soyuz-Dragon crew swap system. This system ensures that each crew rotation mission includes at least one NASA astronaut and one Roscosmos cosmonaut, allowing both countries to maintain a presence on the International Space Station (ISS) and the ability to sustain their respective systems in case one of the vehicles, either Soyuz or commercial crew, is grounded for an extended period.

Including Kikina in the Crew Dragon mission ensured that both NASA and Roscosmos continued to have representation on the ISS. Additionally, this mission marked the first instance since STS-113, when Nikolai Budarin flew, that a Russian cosmonaut flew on a U.S. spacecraft. It also represented the first launch of a Russian cosmonaut aboard a U.S. space capsule.

The Russian authorities approved the seat exchange between the American and Russian astronauts in June 2022, allowing for this historic collaboration between the two space agencies.

Position	Astronaut
Commander	Nicole Aunapu Mann, NASA; Expedition 68; First spaceflight
Pilot	Josh A. Cassada, NASA; Expedition 68; Only spaceflight
Mission specialist	Koichi Wakata, JAXA; Expedition 68; Fifth and last spaceflight
Mission specialist	Anna Kikina, Roscosmos; Expedition 68; First spaceflight

== Backup for Soyuz MS-22 Crew Return ==
A micro-meteorite punctured a 0.8 mm diameter (0.031 in) hole in the radiator of Soyuz MS-22, raising doubts over its safety. As a result, it was replaced with Soyuz MS-23, launched uncrewed on February 24, 2023.

Until the replacement MS-23 docked to ISS, SpaceX Crew-5 was considered among the options to return the MS-22 crew in case of emergency. SpaceX originally designed Crew Dragon to host a crew of seven at a time. The International Space Station mission management team decided to move NASA astronaut Francisco Rubio's Soyuz seat liner from the Soyuz MS-22 spacecraft to Dragon Endurance to provide lifeboat capabilities in the event Rubio needed to return to Earth because of an emergency evacuation from the space station. The seat liner was moved on January 17, 2023, with installation and configuration continuing the following day. Seat liners have been swapped between two Soyuz, but this was the first time for Soyuz to Crew Dragon. The change allowed for increased crew protection by reducing the heat load inside the MS-22 spacecraft for cosmonauts Sergey Prokopyev and Dmitry Petelin in the event of an emergency return to Earth. The SpaceX Crew-6 space capsule is designed to bring back crew serving as an emergency evacuation option after Crew-5.

As MS-23 arrived at the space station on February 26, Rubio's seat liner was transferred to the new Soyuz on March 6, and the seat liners for Prokopyev and Petelin were moved from MS-22 to MS-23 on March 2 ahead of their return in the Soyuz.

== Gallery ==
SpaceX Crew-5
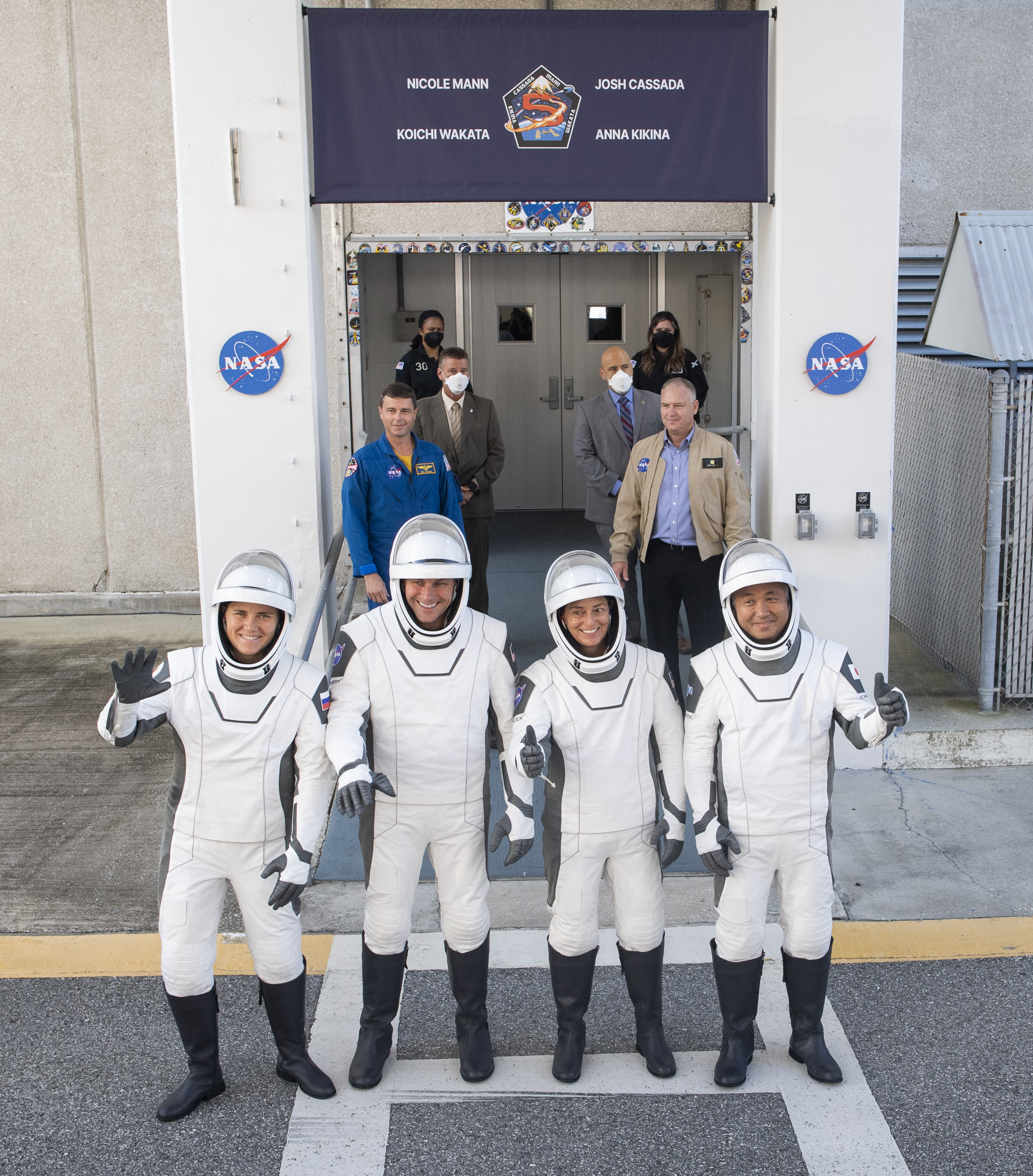
Crew-5 astronauts prior to launch

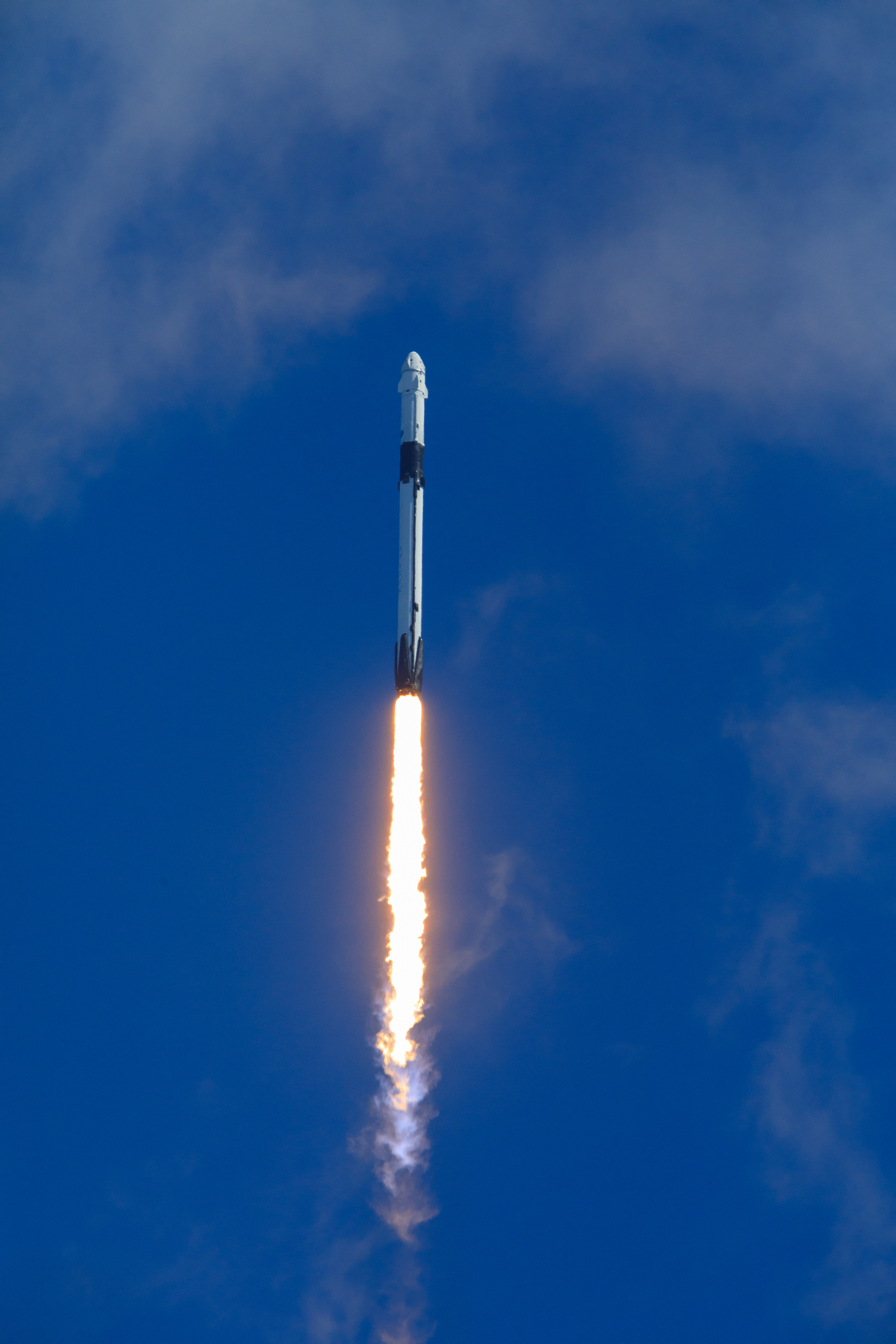
Crew-5 launch

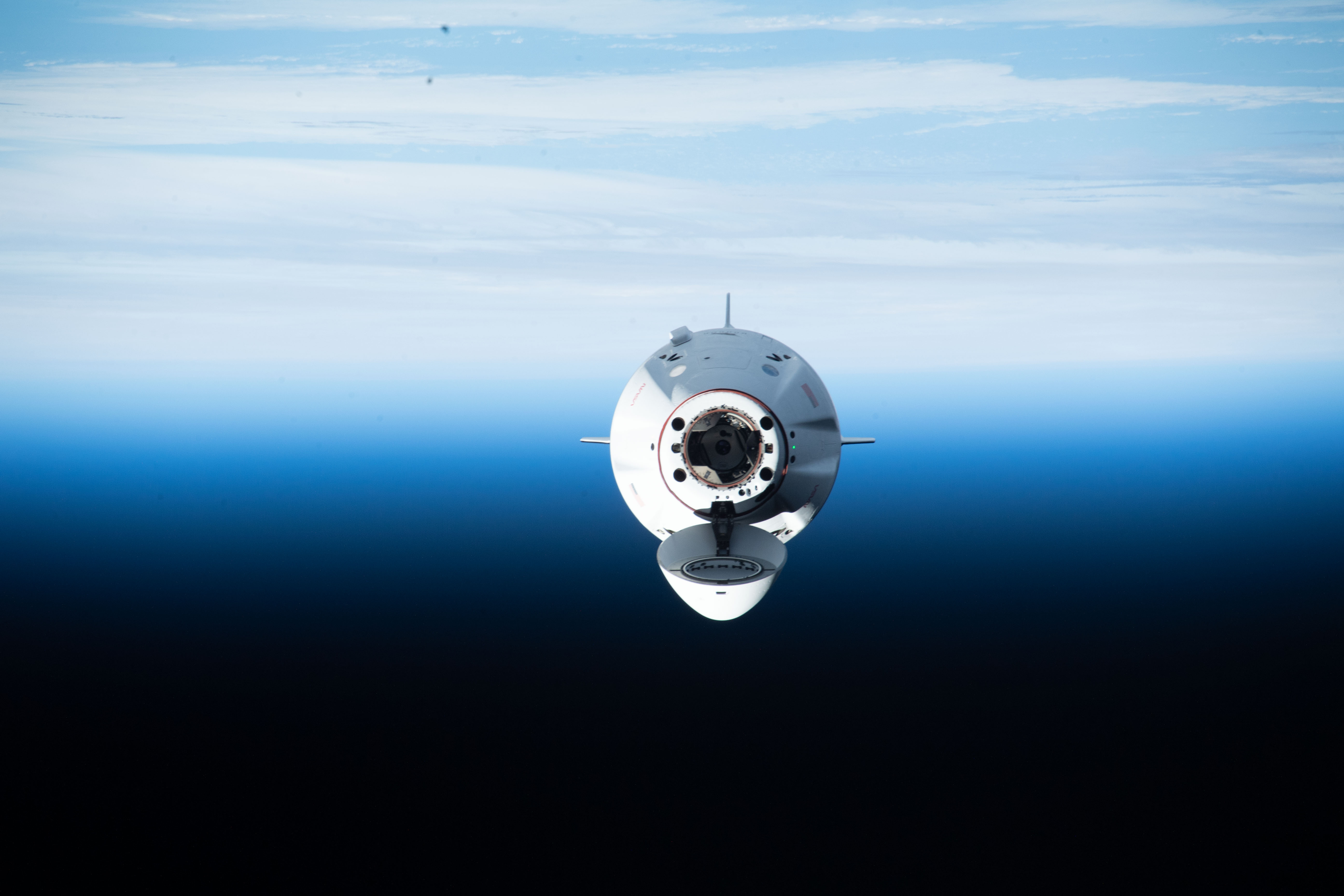
Crew-5 approaching the ISS

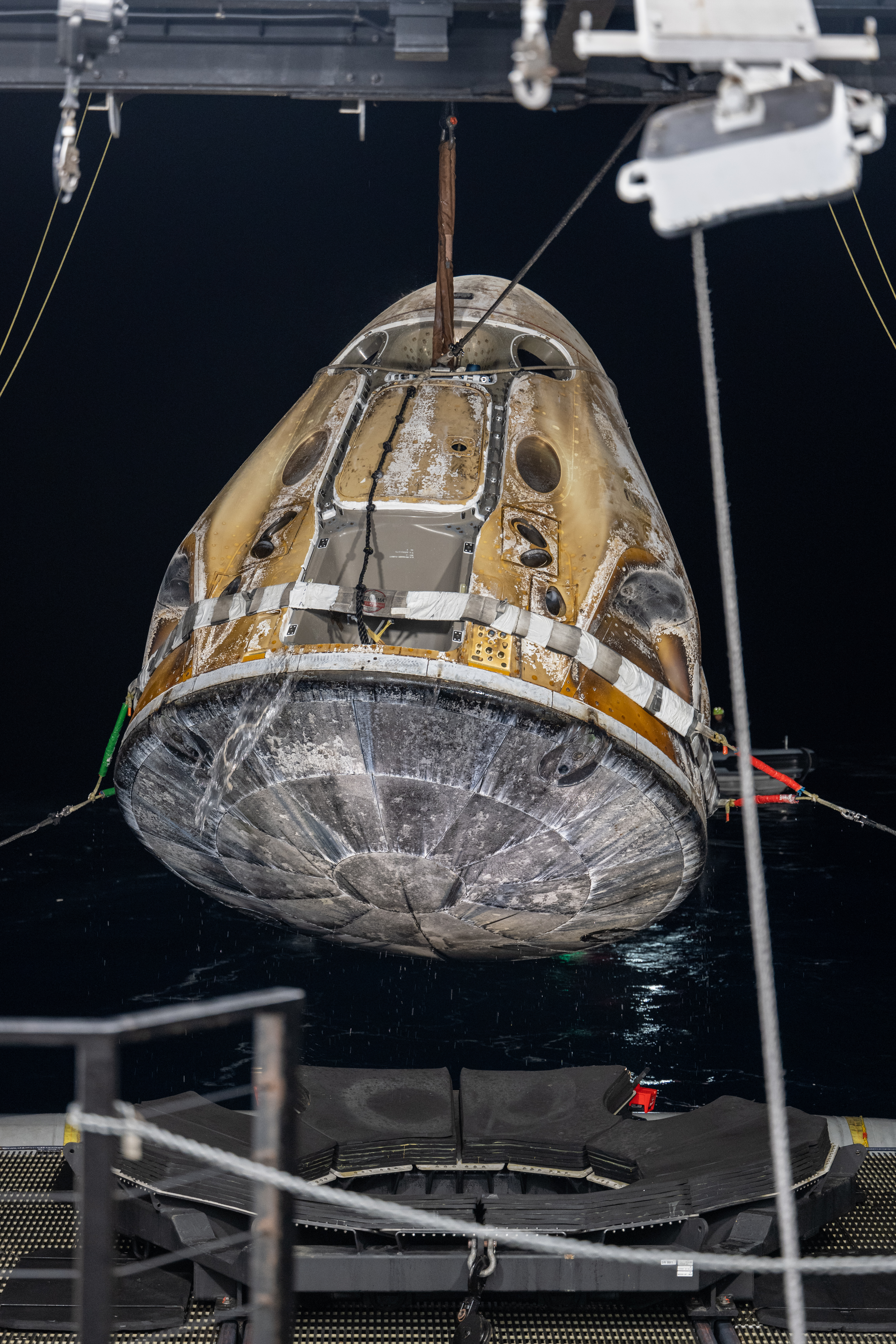
Crew-5 recovery after reentry and landing
