= Marcos Berríos =

Naval aviator and NASA astronaut

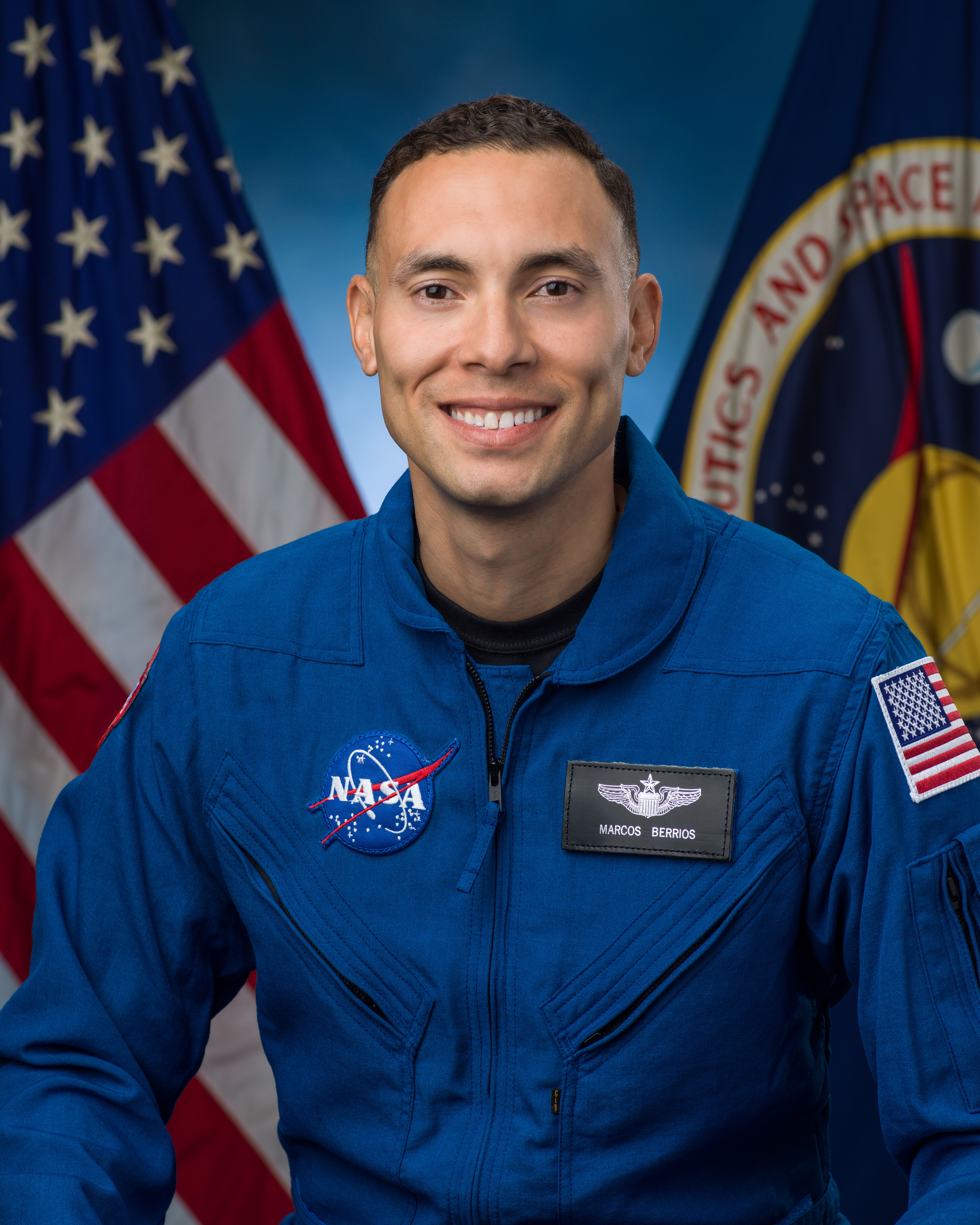
- Berrios in 2021
- Born: Marcos Gabriel Berríos Roldán; January 15, 1984 (age 42); Fort Campbell, Tennessee, U.S.
- Education: Massachusetts Institute of Technology (BS); Stanford University (MS, PhD)
- Space career

NASA astronaut
- Rank: Major, California Air National Guard
- Selection: NASA Group 23 (2021)
- Scientific career
- Fields: Aeronautics
- Thesis: Flight Dynamics and Control of Two Autonomous Helicopters Carrying an External Slung Load (2019)
- Doctoral advisor: David Powell

Marcos Gabriel Berríos Roldán is a major in the United States Air Force and a NASA astronaut.

== Early life and education ==
Berríos was born in Fort Campbell, Tennessee, United States and raised in Guaynabo, Puerto Rico. He went to Antilles High School, in Fort Buchanan, Puerto Rico where he graduated. He holds a bachelor's degree in mechanical engineering from the Massachusetts Institute of Technology and a master's degree in mechanical engineering as well as a doctorate in Aeronautics and Astronautics from Stanford University. He also graduated from the United States Naval Test Pilot School at Naval Air Station Patuxent River, in Maryland.

== Career ==
Completed Initial Flight Training in 2008. He began his operational flying career in 2011 in the California Air National Guard as a HH-60G Combat Search and Rescue (CSAR) helicopter pilot with the 129th Rescue Wing at Moffett Federal Airfield in California, Berríos worked as an aerospace engineer for the U.S. Army Aviation Development Directorate also at Moffett Federal Airfield. He was also Commander of the 1st Det 413th Flight Test Squadron. A distinguished pilot, Berríos has accumulated more than 110 combat missions and 1,300 hours of flight time in more than 21 different aircraft.

== Astronaut candidacy ==
On December 6, 2021, he was revealed to be one of the 10 candidates selected in the 2021 NASA Astronaut Group 23. At the time of his selection as a NASA astronaut candidate, Berríos served as the commander of Detachment 1, 413th Flight Test Squadron and deputy director of the Combat Search and Rescue (CSAR) Combined Task Force. He reported for duty in January 2022.

== Awards and honors ==
Air Medal with three oak leaf clusters; Air Force Expeditionary Service Ribbon with gold border; Air Force Commendation Medal with one oak leaf cluster; Gates Millennium Scholar, NASA Group Achievement Award.
