= Expedition 68 =

Long-duration mission to the International Space Station

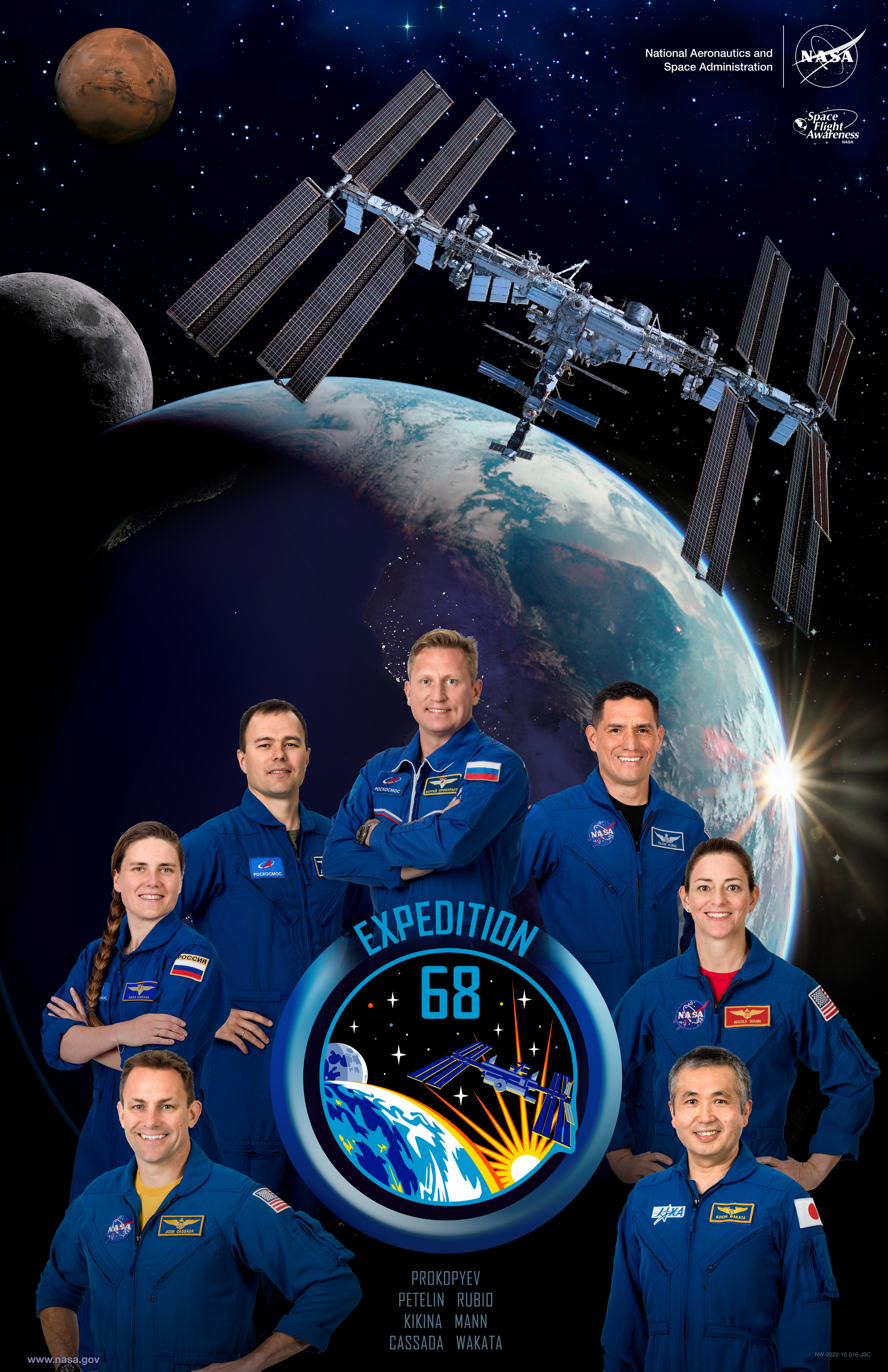
- Promotional poster
- Mission type: Long-duration expedition
- Operator: NASA / Roscosmos
- Mission duration: 180 days, 2 hours and 23 minutes

Expedition
- Space station: International Space Station
- Began: 29 September 2022
- Ended: 28 March 2023
- Arrived aboard: SpaceX Crew-4; Soyuz MS-22; SpaceX Crew-5; SpaceX Crew-6
- Departed aboard: SpaceX Crew-4; SpaceX Crew-5

Crew
- Crew size: 7-11
- Members: Expedition 67/68: Kjell N. Lindgren; Bob Hines; Samantha Cristoforetti (Note: The European portion of SpaceX Crew-4 is called Minerva, which is headed by Samantha Cristoforetti.); Jessica Watkins; Expedition 67/68/69: Sergey Prokopyev; Dmitry Petelin; Francisco Rubio; Expedition 68: Nicole Mann; Josh Cassada; Koichi Wakata; Anna Kikina; Expedition 68/69: Stephen Bowen; Warren Hoburg; Sultan Al Neyadi; Andrey Fedyaev
- EVAs: 6
- EVA duration: 41 hours and 51 minutes
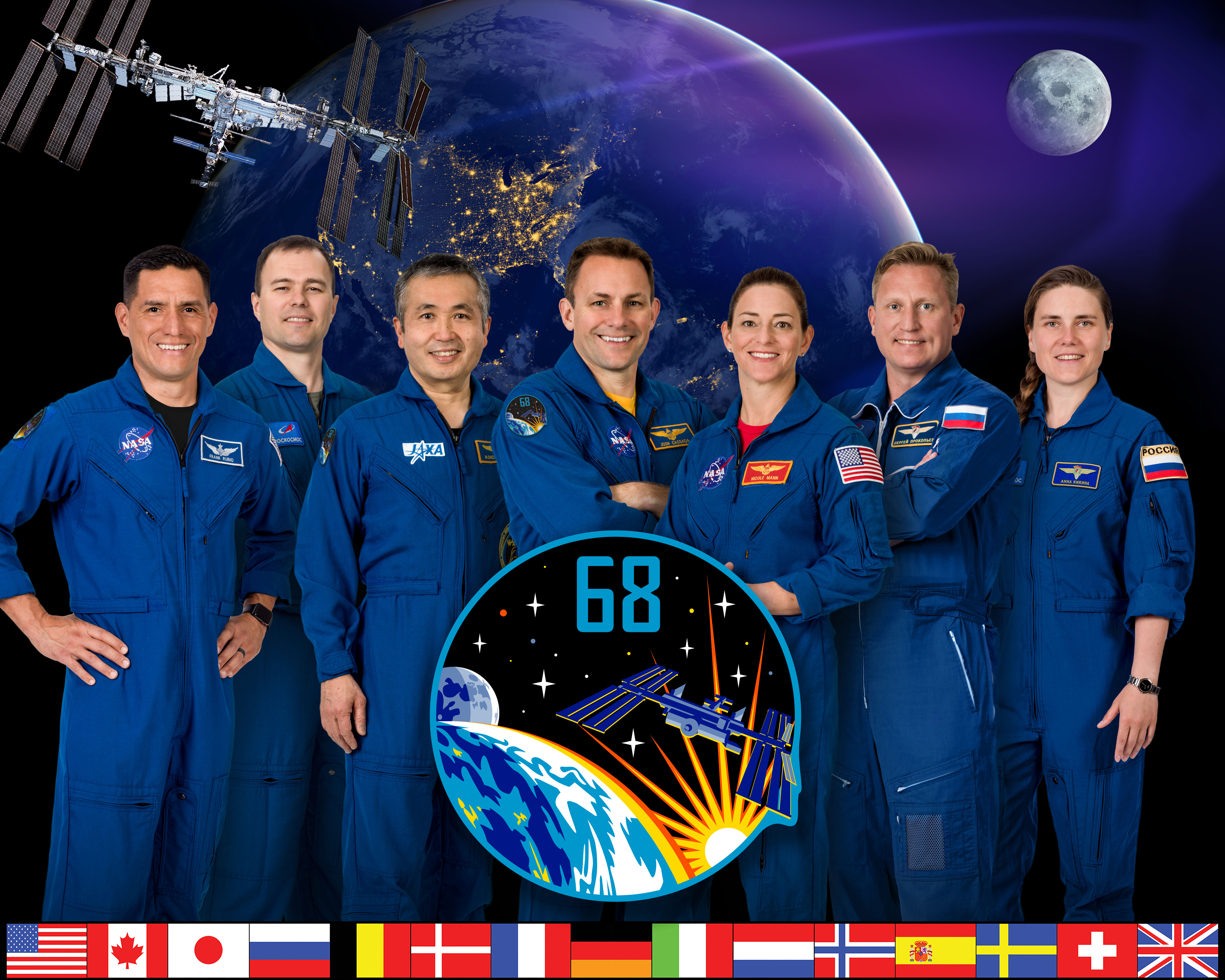
- Expedition 68 mission patch Expedition 68 crew portrait (C portion) ISS expeditions

Expedition 68 was the 68th long-duration expedition to the International Space Station. The expedition began upon the departure of Soyuz MS-21 on 29 September 2022 with ESA astronaut Samantha Cristoforetti taking over as ISS commander and ended upon the uncrewed departure of Soyuz MS-22 on 28 March 2023.

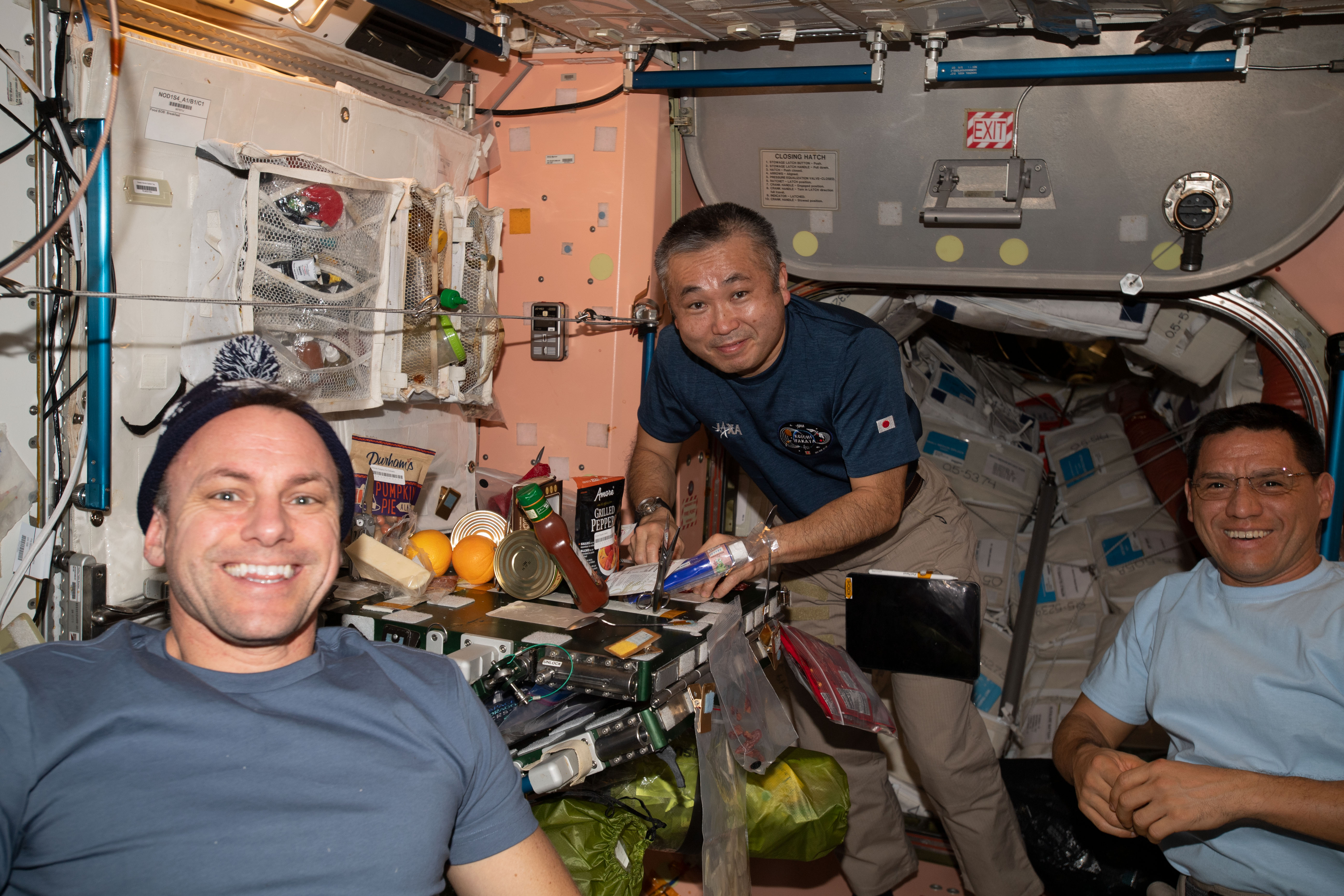
(from left) Cassada, Wakata, and Rubio enjoy Christmas Eve dinner on orbit in 2022

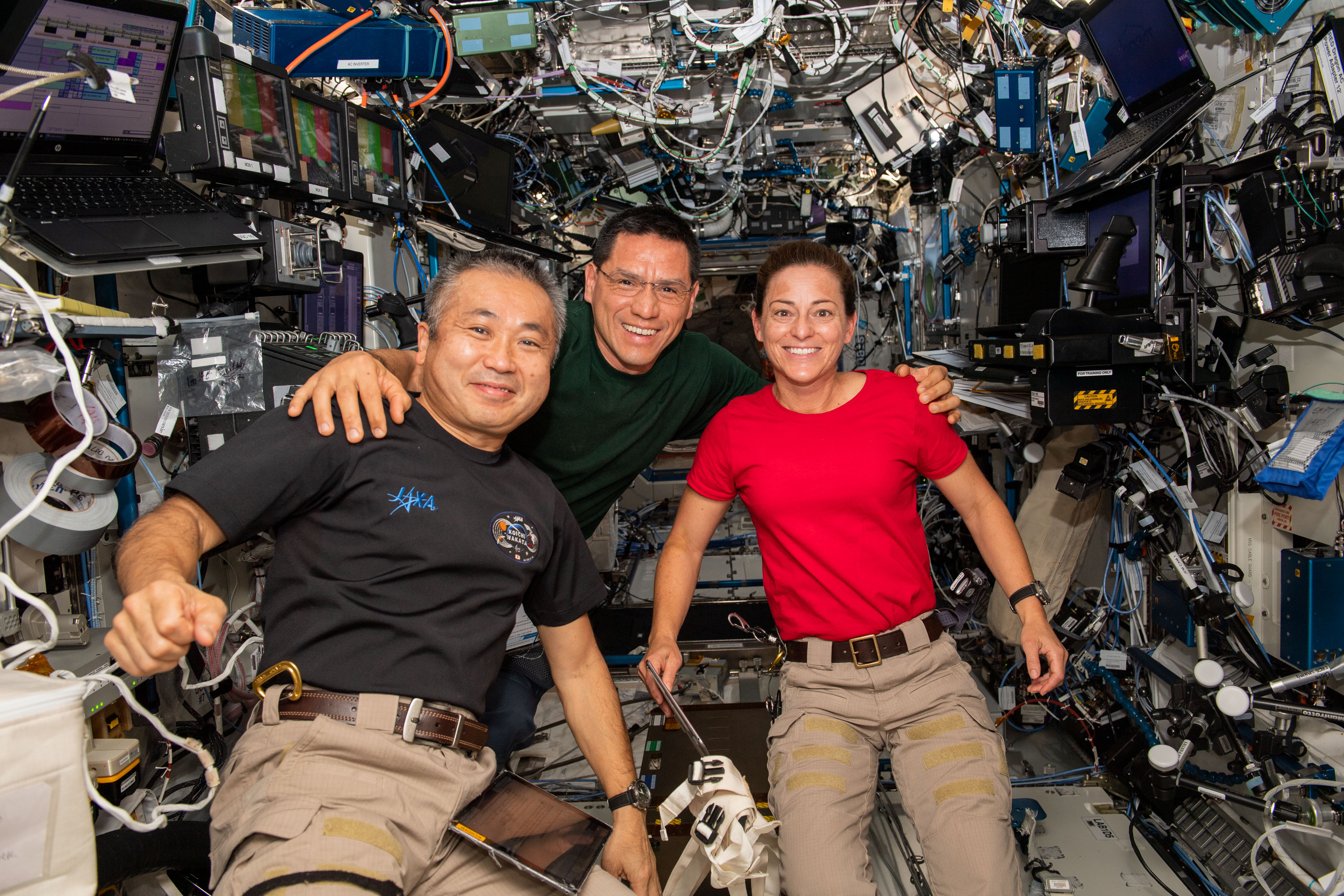
Wakata (left), Rubio (center), Mann (right) imaged on station in November 2022.

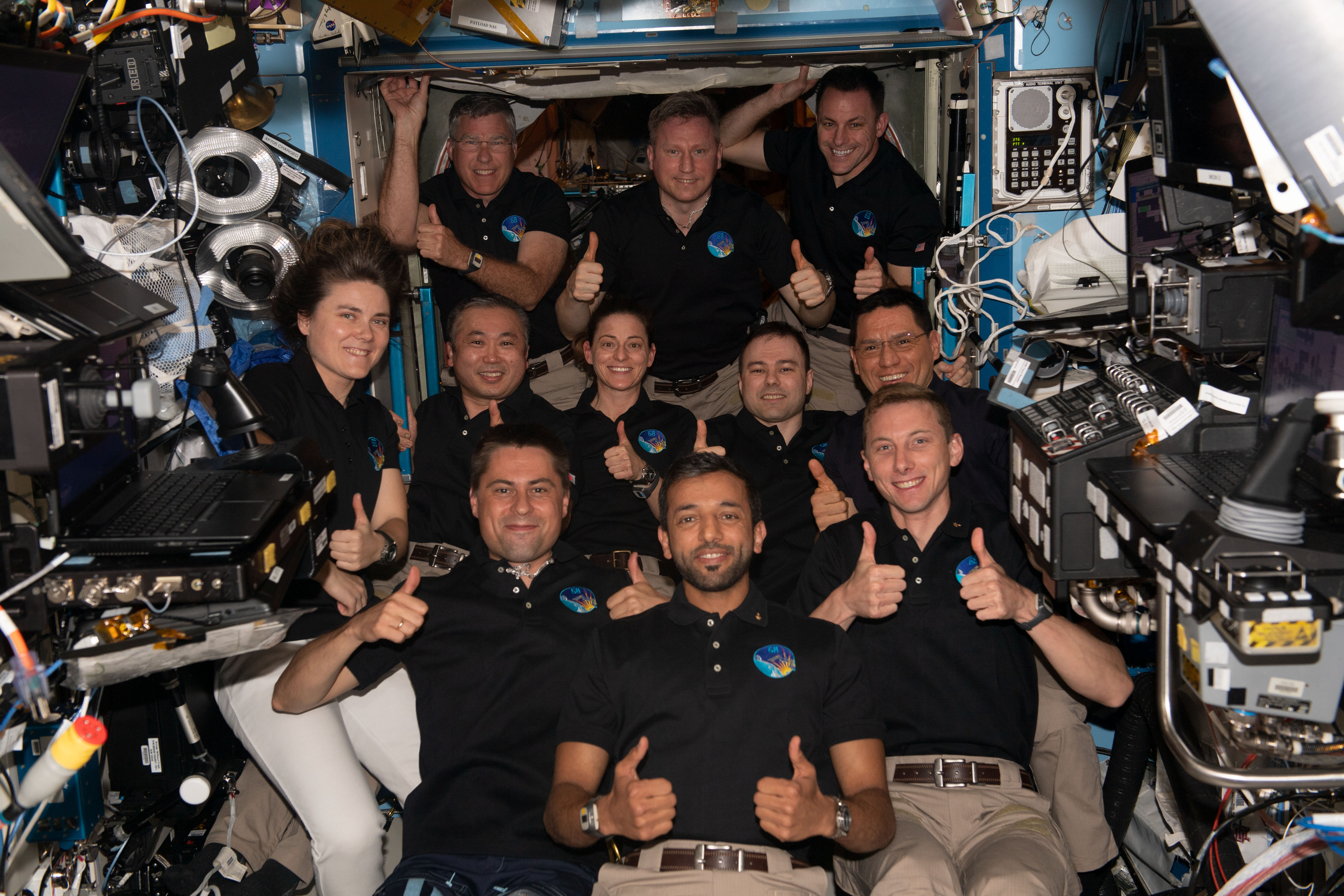
Expedition 68 crew at ISS

== Background, Crew, and Events ==
Initially, the expedition consisted of Cristoforetti and her three SpaceX Crew-4 crewmates Kjell N. Lindgren, Bob Hines, and Jessica Watkins, as well as Roscosmos cosmonauts Sergey Prokopyev, Dmitry Petelin, and American astronaut Francisco Rubio, who launched aboard Soyuz MS-22 on September 21, 2022 and were transferred from Expedition 67 alongside the Crew-4 astronauts.

Crew-4 departed the station on 14 October 2022 and was replaced by SpaceX Crew-5 through a direct handover, which ferried NASA astronauts Nicole Mann and Josh Cassada, as well as JAXA astronaut Koichi Wakata and Roscosmos cosmonaut Anna Kikina to the station. Before departing, Cristoforetti handed command of the station over to Prokopyev.

On December 14, 2022, a coolant leak was discovered on the docked Soyuz MS-22 vehicle, causing it to leak ammonia, which forced the cancellation of an imminent Russian spacewalk.

After observation and imaging of the damaged spacecraft, in January 2023, Roscosmos and NASA announced that due to the leak, the MS-22 vehicle could not safely return the crew, except in an emergency. The governing bodies also announced changes to the crew manifest: the crew remaining on the station for 12 months and the Soyuz MS-22 spacecraft to return uncrewed. The Soyuz MS-23 spacecraft was launched uncrewed in February, and the crew returned to Earth on 27 September 2023. The original MS-23 crew instead launched on Soyuz MS-24 to work on the station for both Expedition 69 and 70 instead of Expedition 68 and 69. Rubio's seat liner was shifted to Crew 5 and ultimately all Soyuz MS-22 seat liners were shifted to Soyuz MS-23 as seat liner are specifically designed to seat the cosmonaut seat in it. Usually, this seat liner swapping is not new between two Soyuz but first time for Soyuz to Crew Dragon.

In February, on the day of docking for the Progress MS-22/83P vehicle, another Russian craft Progress MS-21/82P experienced a coolant leak, the second to occur on station in just two months. Due to this, Russian officials on the ground had postponed the uncrewed launch of the Soyuz MS-23 until an investigation was conducted or a cause was found. Days after the leak, it was determined safe to launch Soyuz MS-23, being launched on February 24. Roscosmos conducted a thermal test of MS-22, which lost coolant agent in the external contour due to the damage of the radiator.

In an unrelated change to the US crew manifest, SpaceX's Crew-6 mission launched on 2 March 2023, as opposed to the usual launch date of April/September. Traditionally, expeditions end with the departure of a Soyuz. This continues with Expedition 68, albeit without crew onboard. All onboard crew were transferred to Expedition 69 with the uncrewed departure of Soyuz MS-22 on 28 March.

== Events manifest ==
Events involving crewed spacecraft are listed in bold.

Previous mission: Expedition 67

- 29 September 2022 – **Soyuz MS-21 undocking, official switch from Expedition 67**
- 6 October 2022 – **SpaceX Crew-5 docking**
- 12 October 2022 – ISS Expedition 68 change of command ceremony from Samantha Cristoforetti to Sergey Prokopyev
- 14 October 2022 – **SpaceX Crew-4 undocking**
- 9 November 2022 – CRS NG-18 capture and berthing
- 23 October 2022 – Progress MS-19/80P undocking
- 27 October 2022 – Progress MS-21/82P docking
- 15 November 2022 – EVA 1 (US-81) Cassada/Rubio: 7 hrs, 11 mins
- 17 November 2022 – EVA 2 (VKD-55) Prokopyev/Petelin: 6 hrs, 25 mins; installed a work platform called the SKKO (translation: Nauka means of attachment of large payloads) on the Nauka module
- 27 November 2022 – CRS SpX-26 docking
- 3 December 2022 – EVA 3 (US-82) Cassada/Rubio: 7 hrs, 5 mins; installed an iROSA at Array 3A
- 14 December 2022 – Soyuz MS-22 Leak, cancelled Russian EVA
- 22 December 2022 – EVA 4 (US-83) Rubio/Cassada: 7 hrs, 8 mins; installed the fourth iROSA at Array 4A
- 9 January 2023 - CRS SpX-26 undocking
- 17/18 January 2023 - Rubio's seat liner moved from Soyuz MS-22 to SpaceX Crew-5
- 20 January 2023 - EVA 5 (US-84) Wakata/Mann: 7 hrs, 21 mins
- 2 February 2023 - EVA 6 (US-85) Mann/Wakata: 6 hrs, 41 mins
- 11 February 2023 - Progress MS-22/83P docking
- 11 February 2023 - Progress MS-21/82P Leak Event
- 18 February 2023 - Progress MS-21/82P undocking
- 26 February 2023 - Soyuz MS-23 uncrewed docking
- 2 March 2023 - Prokopyev and Petelin's seat liner moved from Soyuz MS-22 to Soyuz MS-23
- 3 March 2023 - **SpaceX Crew-6 docking**
- 6 March 2023 - Rubio's seat liner moved from SpaceX Crew-5 to Soyuz MS-23
- 11 March 2023 - **SpaceX Crew-5 undocking**
- 15 March 2023 - Thermal test of Soyuz MS-22 by onboard cosmonauts to check how much it will heat up and whether it can be used for emergency evacuation from the ISS in case of any incident
- 16 March 2023 - CRS SpX-27 docking
- 28 March 2023 - Soyuz MS-22 uncrewed undocking; official switch to Expedition 69

Next: Expedition 69

== Crew ==
Flight	Astronaut	Increment 68a	Increment 68b	Increment 68c	Increment 68d	Increment 68e
Flight	Astronaut	29 Sep – 6 Oct 2022	6–14 Oct 2022	14 Oct 2022 – 3 Mar 2023	3–11 Mar 2023	11–28 Mar 2023
Soyuz MS-22	Sergey Prokopyev, Roscosmos; Second spaceflight	Flight engineer		Commander		
Soyuz MS-22	Dmitry Petelin, Roscosmos; First spaceflight	Flight engineer				
Soyuz MS-22	Francisco Rubio, NASA; First spaceflight	Flight engineer				
SpaceX Crew-4	Kjell N. Lindgren, NASA; Second spaceflight	Flight engineer		Off station		
SpaceX Crew-4	Bob Hines, NASA; First spaceflight	Flight engineer		Off station		
SpaceX Crew-4	Samantha Cristoforetti, ESA; Second spaceflight	Commander		Off station		
SpaceX Crew-4	Jessica Watkins, NASA; First spaceflight	Flight engineer		Off station		
SpaceX Crew-5	Nicole Mann, NASA; First spaceflight	Off station	Flight engineer			Off station
SpaceX Crew-5	Josh Cassada, NASA; Only spaceflight	Off station	Flight engineer			Off station
SpaceX Crew-5	Koichi Wakata, JAXA; Fifth and last spaceflight	Off station	Flight engineer			Off station
SpaceX Crew-5	Anna Kikina, Roscosmos; First spaceflight	Off station	Flight engineer			Off station
SpaceX Crew-6	Stephen Bowen, NASA; Fourth spaceflight	Off station			Flight engineer	
SpaceX Crew-6	Warren Hoburg, NASA; First spaceflight	Off station			Flight engineer	
SpaceX Crew-6	Sultan Al Neyadi, MBRSC; First spaceflight	Off station			Flight engineer	
SpaceX Crew-6	Andrey Fedyaev, Roscosmos; First spaceflight	Off station			Flight engineer	

Anna Kikina's ride to the station on Crew-5 marked the first time in NASA's Commercial Crew Program that a Russian cosmonaut flew on Dragon, and the first time a Russian flew on a US spacecraft since the end of the Space Shuttle program.

Koichi Wakata's flight to the ISS was his fifth, and his first on Dragon. Combined with his previous flights on Soyuz and the Space Shuttle, he becomes the eighth person to fly on three different Earth-launching spacecraft.

== Vehicle manifest ==
Vehicle	Purpose	Port	Docking/capture date	Undocking date
Vehicles inherited from Expedition 66 or Expedition 67
Progress MS-19	Cargo	Poisk zenith	17 Feb 2022 (Exp. 66)	23 Oct 2022
SpaceX Crew-4 "Freedom"	Exp. 67/68 crew	Harmony zenith	27 Apr 2022 (Exp. 67)	14 Oct 2022
Progress MS-20	Cargo	Zvezda aft	3 Jun 2022 (Exp. 67)	7 Feb 2023
Soyuz MS-22 "Altai"	Exp. 67/68/69 crew	Rassvet nadir	21 Sept 2022 (Exp. 67)	28 Mar 2023
Vehicles docked during Expedition 68
SpaceX Crew-5 "Endurance"	Exp. 68 crew	Harmony forward	6 Oct 2022	11 Mar 2023
Progress MS-21	Cargo	Poisk zenith	28 Oct 2022	18 Feb 2023
CRS NG-18	Cargo	Unity nadir	9 Nov 2022	21 Apr 2023 (Exp. 69)
CRS SpX-26	Cargo	Harmony zenith	27 Nov 2022	9 Jan 2023
Progress MS-22	Cargo	Zvezda aft	11 Feb 2023	20 Aug 2023 (Exp. 69)
Soyuz MS-23	Exp. 67/68/69 crew	Poisk zenith	26 Feb 2023	6 Apr 2023 (Exp. 69; redock)
Soyuz MS-23	Exp. 67/68/69 crew	Prichal nadir	6 Apr 2023 (Exp. 69; redock)	27 Sep 2023 (Exp. 69)
SpaceX Crew-6 "Endeavour"	Exp. 68/69 crew	Harmony zenith	3 Mar 2023	6 May 2023 (Exp. 69; redock)
SpaceX Crew-6 "Endeavour"	Exp. 68/69 crew	Harmony forward	6 May 2023 (Exp. 69; redock)	3 Sep 2023 (Exp. 69)
CRS SpX-27	Cargo	Harmony forward	16 Mar 2023	15 Apr 2023 (Exp. 69)

Segment	U.S. Orbital Segment				Russian Orbital Segment			
Period	Harmony forward	Harmony zenith	Harmony nadir	Unity nadir	Rassvet nadir	Prichal nadir	Poisk zenith	Zvezda aft
29 Sep-6 Oct 2022	Vacant	SpaceX Crew-4	Vacant	Vacant	Soyuz MS-22	Vacant	Progress MS-19	Progress MS-20
6-14 Oct 2022	SpaceX Crew-5	SpaceX Crew-4	Vacant	Vacant	Soyuz MS-22	Vacant	Progress MS-19	Progress MS-20
14-23 Oct 2022	SpaceX Crew-5	Vacant	Vacant	Vacant	Soyuz MS-22	Vacant	Progress MS-19	Progress MS-20
23-28 Oct 2022	SpaceX Crew-5	Vacant	Vacant	Vacant	Soyuz MS-22	Vacant	Vacant	Progress MS-20
28 Oct-9 Nov 2022	SpaceX Crew-5	Vacant	Vacant	Vacant	Soyuz MS-22	Vacant	Progress MS-21	Progress MS-20
9-27 Nov 2022	SpaceX Crew-5	Vacant	Vacant	CRS NG-18	Soyuz MS-22	Vacant	Progress MS-21	Progress MS-20
27 Nov 2022-9 Jan 2023	SpaceX Crew-5	CRS SpX-26	Vacant	CRS NG-18	Soyuz MS-22	Vacant	Progress MS-21	Progress MS-20
9 Jan-7 Feb 2023	SpaceX Crew-5	Vacant	Vacant	CRS NG-18	Soyuz MS-22	Vacant	Progress MS-21	Progress MS-20
7-11 Feb 2023	SpaceX Crew-5	Vacant	Vacant	CRS NG-18	Soyuz MS-22	Vacant	Progress MS-21	Vacant
11-18 Feb 2023	SpaceX Crew-5	Vacant	Vacant	CRS NG-18	Soyuz MS-22	Vacant	Progress MS-21	Progress MS-22
18-26 Feb 2023	SpaceX Crew-5	Vacant	Vacant	CRS NG-18	Soyuz MS-22	Vacant	Vacant	Progress MS-22
26 Feb-3 Mar 2023	SpaceX Crew-5	Vacant	Vacant	CRS NG-18	Soyuz MS-22	Vacant	Soyuz MS-23	Progress MS-22
3-11 Mar 2023	SpaceX Crew-5	SpaceX Crew-6	Vacant	CRS NG-18	Soyuz MS-22	Vacant	Soyuz MS-23	Progress MS-22
11-16 Mar 2023	Vacant	SpaceX Crew-6	Vacant	CRS NG-18	Soyuz MS-22	Vacant	Soyuz MS-23	Progress MS-22
16-28 Mar 2023	CRS SpX-27	SpaceX Crew-6	Vacant	CRS NG-18	Soyuz MS-22	Vacant	Soyuz MS-23	Progress MS-22

The Prichal aft, forward, starboard, and aft ports all have yet to be used since the module originally docked to the station and are not included in the table.
