= Nicole Aunapu Mann =

American astronaut

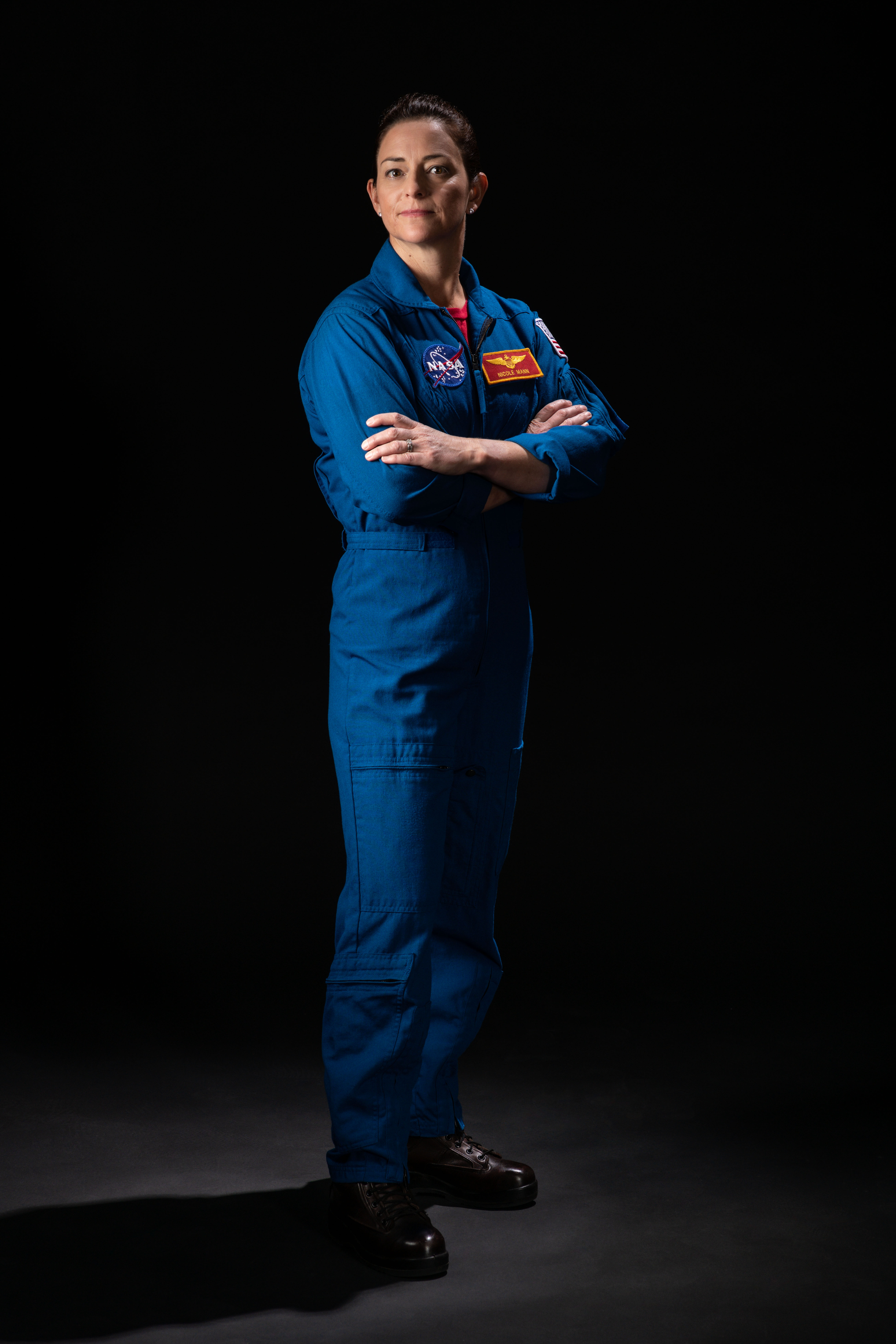
- Mann in 2022
- Born: Nicole Victoria Aunapu; June 27, 1977 (age 49); Petaluma, California, U.S.
- Education: United States Naval Academy (BS); Stanford University (MS)
- Spouse: Travis R. Mann
- Children: 1
- Call sign: Duke
- Space career

NASA astronaut
- Rank: Colonel, U.S. Marine Corps
- Time in space: 157 days, 10 hours, 1 minute
- Selection: NASA Group 21 (2013)
- Total EVAs: 2
- Total EVA time: 14 hours, 2 minutes
- Missions: SpaceX Crew-5 (Expedition 68)
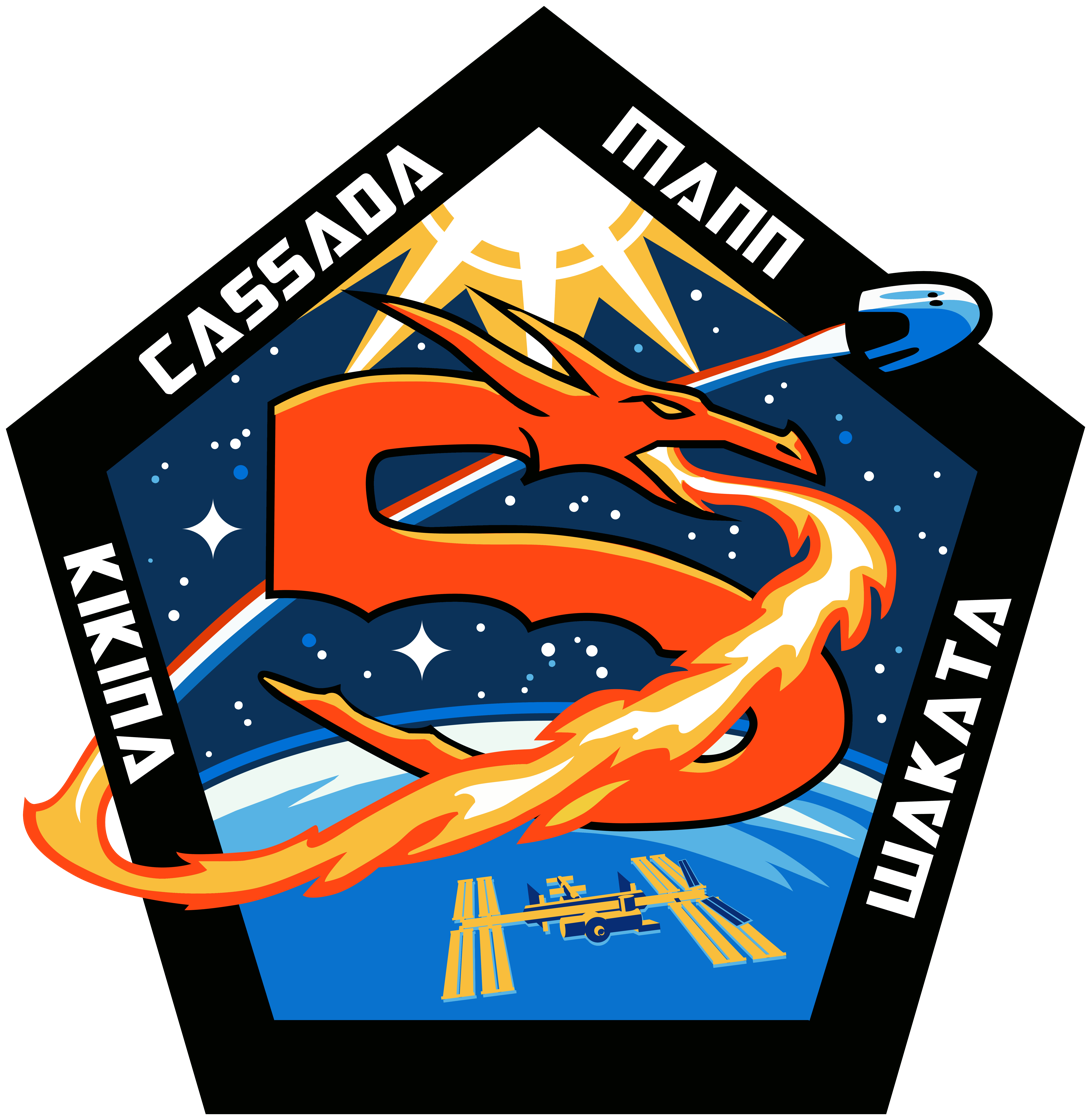
- Mission insignia
Association football career
- Position: Defender
College career
Years	Team	Apps	(Gls)
1995–1999	Navy Midshipmen	75	(1)

Nicole Victoria "Duke" Aunapu Mann (born June 27, 1977) is an American test pilot and NASA astronaut. She is an F/A-18 Hornet pilot and a graduate of the US Naval Academy, Stanford University, and the US Naval Test Pilot School. A US Marine, she has over 2,500 flight hours in 25 types of aircraft and 200 carrier landings, and has flown 47 combat missions in Iraq and Afghanistan. Mann completed astronaut training in 2015 and was assigned in August 2018 to Boe-CFT, the first crewed test flight of the Boeing CST-100 Starliner, but subsequently reassigned to the SpaceX Crew-5, becoming the first female commander of a NASA Commercial Crew Program launch.

Her first spaceflight launched in October 2022 and made her the first Native American woman in space. She stayed in space for months, and on January 20, 2023, she became the first Native American woman to go on a spacewalk, which she went on with Koichi Wakata.

== Early life, background, and education ==
Nicole Victoria Aunapu Mann was born on June 27, 1977, to Howard and Victoria Aunapu and grew up in Penngrove, California.

Her name Aunapu (a Germanised version of "õunapuu", meaning "apple tree") is Estonian, as her grandfather Helmuth Aunapu was from Tallinn in Estonia, but his family originated from the Estonian island of Hiiumaa. He emigrated in United States in the 1920s and later served as an engineer in the US Armed Forces. Nicole Aunapu visited Estonia for the first time in September 2023.

Of Wailaki heritage, she is an enrolled member of the Round Valley Indian Tribes.

Mann graduated in 1995 from Rancho Cotate High School in Rohnert Park, California. She attended the US Naval Academy and graduated in 1999 with a Bachelor of Science degree in mechanical engineering. She played for the Navy Midshipmen women's soccer team as a defender, scoring one goal and recording four assists in 75 appearances. After commissioning in the US Marine Corps, she attended graduate school at Stanford University, where she received a Master of Science degree in mechanical engineering, specializing in fluid mechanics.

== Military career ==
After graduate school, Mann attended The Basic School and began flight training at Naval Air Station Pensacola. She received her Naval Aviator wings in 2002 and completed training for the F/A-18 Hornet in VFA-106 at Naval Air Station Oceana. Mann joined VMFA-251 at Marine Corps Air Station Beaufort and deployed twice on the USS Enterprise with CVW-1 in support of Operation Iraqi Freedom and Operation Enduring Freedom. As a naval aviator, Mann was assigned the call sign "Duke". She was a member of Class 135 at the US Naval Test Pilot School and served as an F/A-18 Test Pilot in VX-23 at Naval Air Station Patuxent River. At the time of her selection as an astronaut candidate, she was Joint Mission Planning System Expeditionary Integrated Product Team Lead at PMA-281.

== NASA career ==
In 2013, Mann was selected as one of the eight members of NASA Astronaut Group 21. She completed her training in 2015 and has since served as a T-38 Talon Safety and Training Officer and was the Assistant to the Chief of Exploration. She worked on development of the Orion spacecraft, Space Launch System, and the Exploration Ground Systems. In August 2018, she was assigned to Boe-CFT, the first crewed test flight of the Boeing CST-100 Starliner. However, in October 2021, Mann was moved to fly on SpaceX's Crew-5 mission as the spacecraft commander, scheduled to fly to the International Space Station on September 29, 2022, later rescheduled to October 5. The SpaceX Crew-5 landed in the Gulf of Mexico on March 11, 2023, 157 days since they launched. She planned to take a dreamcatcher her mother gave her when she was very young to space. The crew lived on the International Space Station for six months.

Mann is also in training for the international Artemis program and is a contender to be the first woman on the Moon as part of the crewed lunar landing currently scheduled for 2028.

== Personal life ==
Mann is married to Travis R. Mann, with whom she has a son. In an interview with National Geographic in December 2020, she said she and her son often sit outside looking at the Moon, and "Hopefully someday, he'll be able to watch Mom fly by and walk on the moon."

== Awards ==
As a student at the Naval Academy, Mann played soccer and was an Academic All American. She was a Trident Scholar and a Distinguished Graduate. During her military career, she received two Air Medals, two Navy and Marine Corps Commendation Medals, and two Navy and Marine Corps Achievement Medals. She was the Honor Graduate in her US Naval Test Pilot School class. She received the NASA 2015 Stephen D. Thorne Safety Award and the 2017 Jerry Yeagley Award for Exceptional Personal Achievement. Mann is a member of the Society of Experimental Test Pilots, Tailhook Association, the US Naval Test Pilot School Alumni Association, and the United States Naval Academy Alumni Association, and received the Leroy Grumman "Best Paper" Award at the East Coast Society of Experimental Test Pilots Symposium.
