= Amateur astronaut =

Untrained participant in a spaceflight

An amateur astronaut is an untrained person participating in a spaceflight. The term is widely used by SpaceX and others, and by widespread media, especially after the launch of Inspiration4, crewed by 4 untrained humans, on a 3-day flight around the Earth.

== List of Amateur astronauts ==
- Christopher Sembroski (Inspiration4, 16 September 2021 – 18 September 2021)
- Sian Proctor (Inspiration4, 16 September 2021 – 18 September 2021)
- Jared Isaacman (Inspiration4, 16 September 2021 – 18 September 2021), (Polaris Dawn, 10 September 2024 – 15 September 2024)
- Hayley Arceneaux (Inspiration4, 16 September 2021 – 18 September 2021)
- Scott Poteet (Polaris Dawn, 10 September 2024 – 15 September 2024)
- Sarah Gillis (Polaris Dawn, 10 September 2024 – 15 September 2024)
- Anna Menon (Polaris Dawn, 10 September 2024 – 15 September 2024)
