= Sian Proctor =

American astronaut and professor

Sian Hayley Proctor
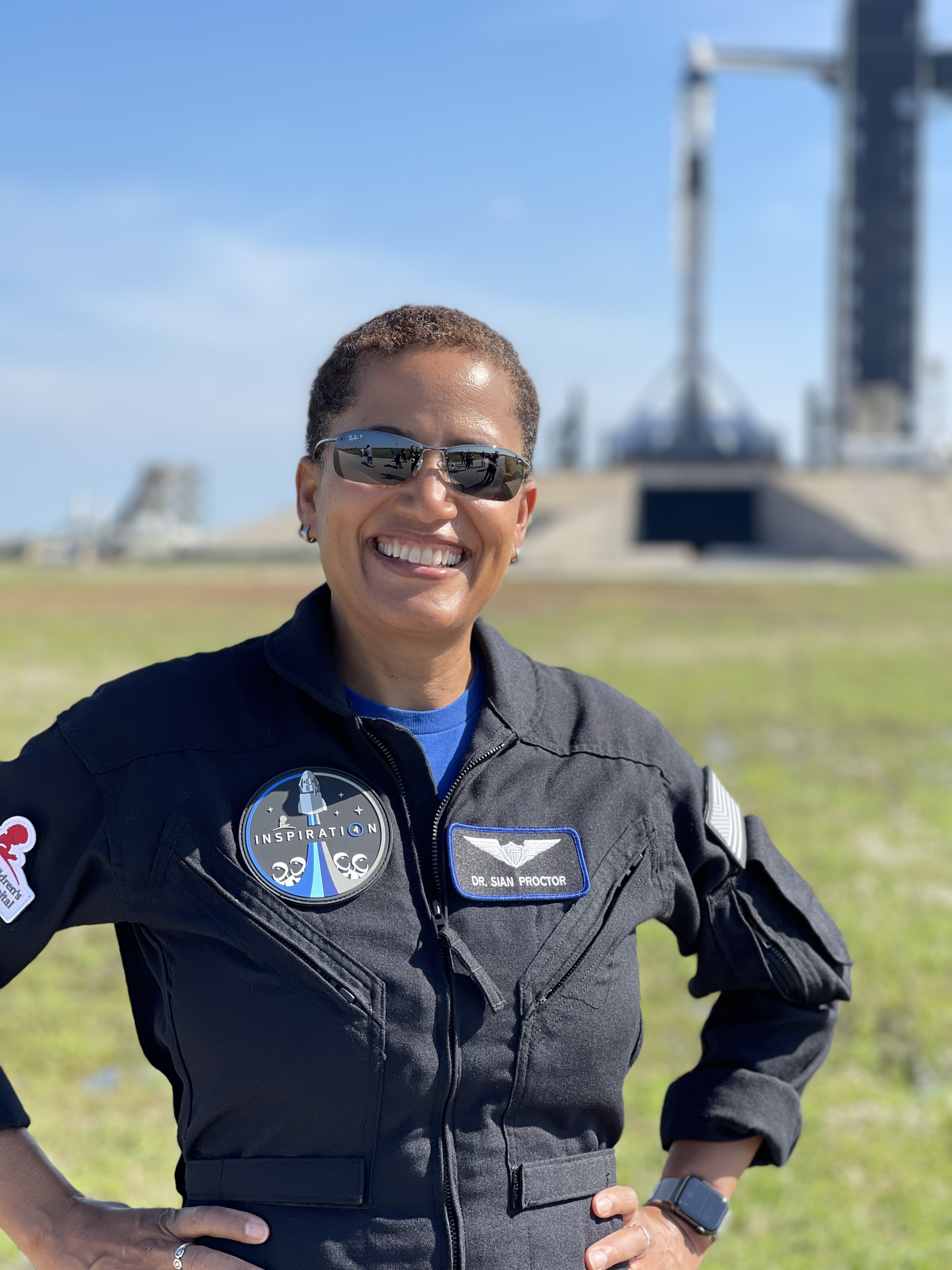
- Proctor in 2021
- Born: 28 March 1970 (age 56); Hagåtña, Guam
- Occupations: Geology professor, and science communicator
- Known for: Private astronaut aboard Inspiration4; Science communicator; Artist; Author/poet; Media personality

Academic background
- Education: Arizona State University, PhD in Science Education (2006); Arizona State University, M.S. in Geology (1998); Edinboro University, B.S. in Environmental Science (1992)
- Thesis: Cognitive process strategies and performance on a contour map memory test (2006)
- Doctoral advisor: Sarah K. Brem

Academic work
- Discipline: Geology and Science education
- Institutions: South Mountain Community College
- Space career

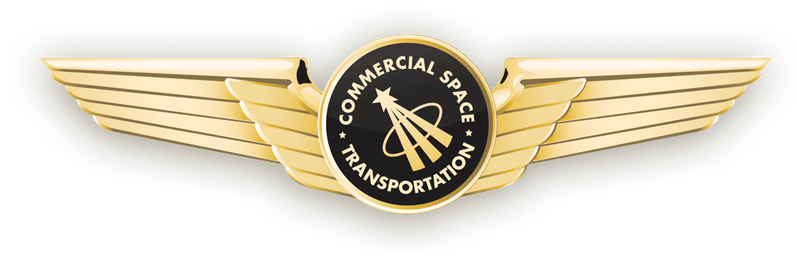
Commercial astronaut
- Time in space: 2d 23h 3m
- Missions: Inspiration4
- Website: drsianproctor.com

Sian Hayley "Leo" Proctor (March 28, 1970) is an American commercial astronaut, geology professor, artist, author, and science communicator. She became the first female commercial spaceship pilot and the first artist selected to go to be an astronaut on the all-civilian Inspiration4 orbital spaceflight, 15 September 2021. As pilot of the Inspiration4's SpaceX Crew Dragon space capsule, Proctor became the first African-American woman to pilot a spacecraft. She was also the education outreach officer for the first Hawaii Space Exploration Analog and Simulation (HI-SEAS) Mission. In 2024, Proctor was selected to be a U.S. Science Envoy for the United States Department of State.

Since Inspiration4, Sian Proctor has become a noted Afrofuturist artist, poet and author. Proctor is the first African American astronaut to paint in space.

Proctor is a major in the Civil Air Patrol where she serves as the aerospace education officer for its Arizona Wing.

== Life and education ==
Sian Proctor was born on 28 March 1970, in Hagåtña, Guam, to Edward Langley Proctor Jr. and Gloria Deloris. Her father was a Sperry Corporation UNIVAC engineer working for NASA at the Guam Remote Ground Terminal during the Apollo era. She is the youngest of four children, with two brothers, Edward Langley Proctor III and Christopher Proctor, and sister Robyn Selent. After the moon landings, Proctor's family moved to Minnesota and later to various Northeastern states while her father changed jobs. Her family moved to Fairport, New York, when she was 14 where she later graduated from Fairport High School.

She studied at Arizona State University, where she received an undergraduate degree on environmental sciences and later a master's degree in geology in 1998. In 2006 she obtained a PhD in Science education. That same year, Proctor got her pilot's license.

She is a member of the Association of Space Explorers. Furthermore in December 2022 she was selected as a member of the National Space Council’s Users Advisory Group. As part of her training as pilot of the Inspiration4 flight, she trained in a Cessna CitationJet CJ3 and (under the tutelage of veteran pilot Isaacman) a MiG-29.

In 2022 she received the honorary degree of Doctor of Humane Letters from University of Massachusetts Lowell.

In 2023 she participated in the space camp Space 2101 at King Abdullah University of Science and Technology.

== Space career ==
=== 2009 NASA Astronaut Selection ===
Proctor was a finalist for the 2009 NASA Astronaut Selection Process. She was one of 47 finalists competing against over 3,500 applicants. Nonetheless, during the final round, she was not one of the nine astronaut candidates selected for the 2009 NASA Astronaut Group.

=== Inspiration4 mission pilot ===
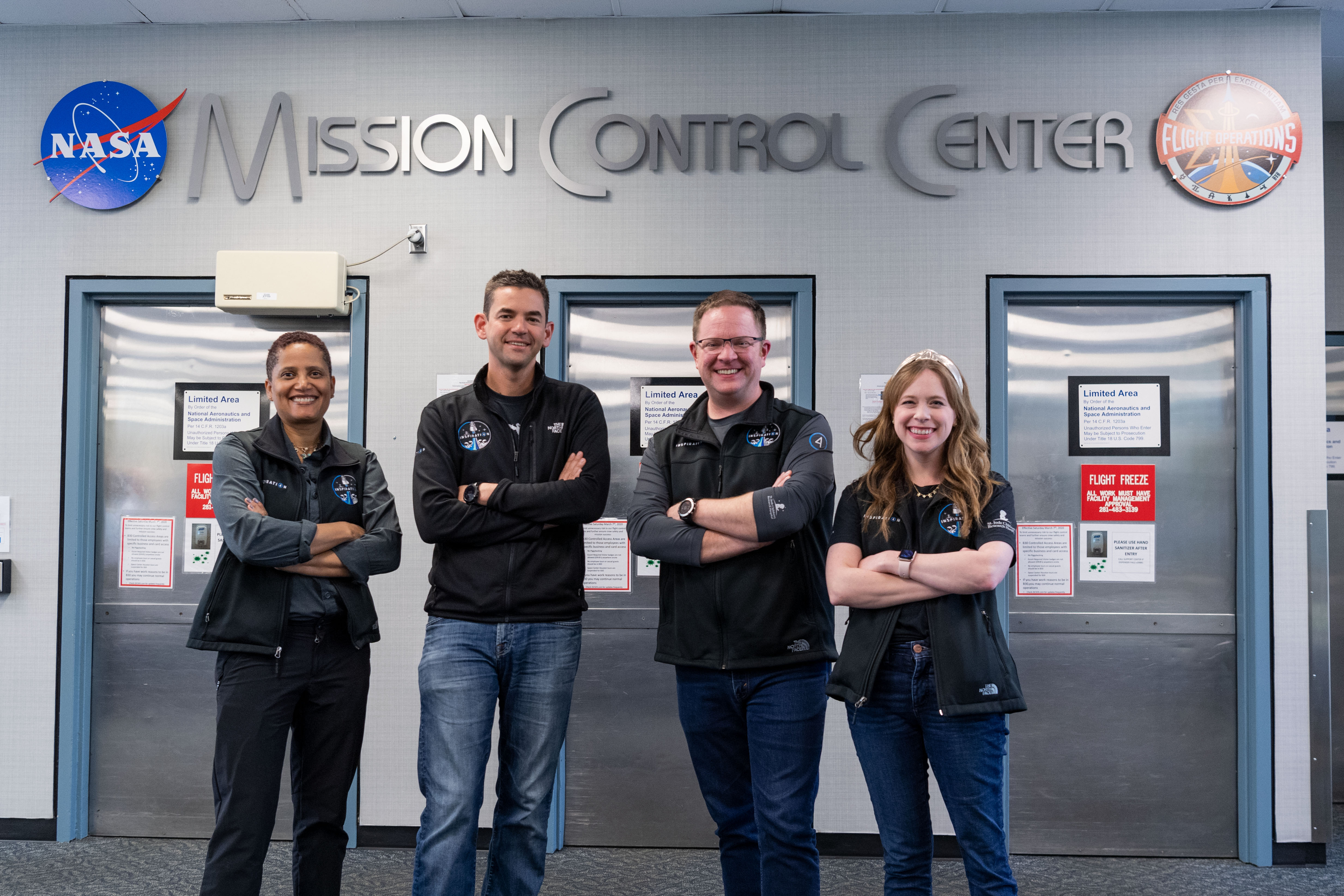
Inspiration4 crew during their visit to the Johnson Space Center at NASA

Proctor went to space as a commercial astronaut and pilot of the Crew Dragon orbital spaceflight mission Inspiration4, which launched on 15 September 2021. The Prosperity seat, was obtained as she won an entrepreneur competition. During the flight training she received the call sign Leo.

She was joined by Jared Isaacman, Hayley Arceneaux, and Chris Sembroski, for the first all-civilian human spaceflight mission. In August 2021 she was featured on the cover of a Time magazine double issue with the rest of the crew of Inspiration4.

=== 2024 U.S. State Department Science Envoy ===
As a scientist-astronaut, Proctor was selected to be a U.S. Science Envoy in 2024 to represent the United States Department of State's global initiative to promote civil use of space in order "to build peer-to-peer connections with foreign researchers, promote space science education, and raise awareness of the importance of space science to society." The 2024 Cohort of U.S. Science Envoys is the first all-female cohort in the history of the U.S. Science Envoy Program.

== Career in science education ==
=== HI-SEAS (2013) ===
Proctor acted as education outreach officer for the NASA-funded Hawaii Space Exploration Analog and Simulation (HI-SEAS) mission. The purpose of the mission was to investigate food strategies for long duration spaceflight and missions to the Moon or Mars.

During the four-month simulation, Proctor was hired by Discover Magazine as the photographer for Kate Greene's article Simulating Mars on Earth. She also filmed the Meals for Mars YouTube series while in the Mars simulation.

=== PolarTREC (2014) ===
In 2014, she was selected as a PolarTREC teacher, which is a program funded by the National Science Foundation (NSF) that connects teachers with scientists conducting research in the arctic and Antarctic regions. As part of this program, she spent a month in Barrow, Alaska learning historical ecology for risk management and investigating the impact of climate change on the coastline and community.

=== Astronomy in Chile Educator Ambassadors Program (ACEAP) (2016) ===
In 2016, she was selected as a ACEAP Ambassador. A program from the National Science Foundation (NSF) that sends K–16 formal and informal astronomy educators to US astronomy facilities in Chile. During the summer of 2016, she joined eight other ambassadors as they visited Cerro Tololo Inter-American Observatory (CTIO), Gemini South Observatory, and the Atacama Large Millimeter-submillimeter Array (ALMA).

Proctor returned to San Pedro, Chile in 2017 to engage in STEM education outreach activities with the local high school and surrounding community.

=== NOAA Teacher at Sea (2017) ===
She participated in the National Oceanic and Atmospheric Administration (NOAA) Teacher at Sea program in 2017. The program was started in 1990 and provides teachers with research experience working at sea. In her case, during three weeks she conducted pollock research in the Bering Sea on the fisheries vessel Oscar Dyson and detailed her experience for the blog of NOAA.

== Science communication ==
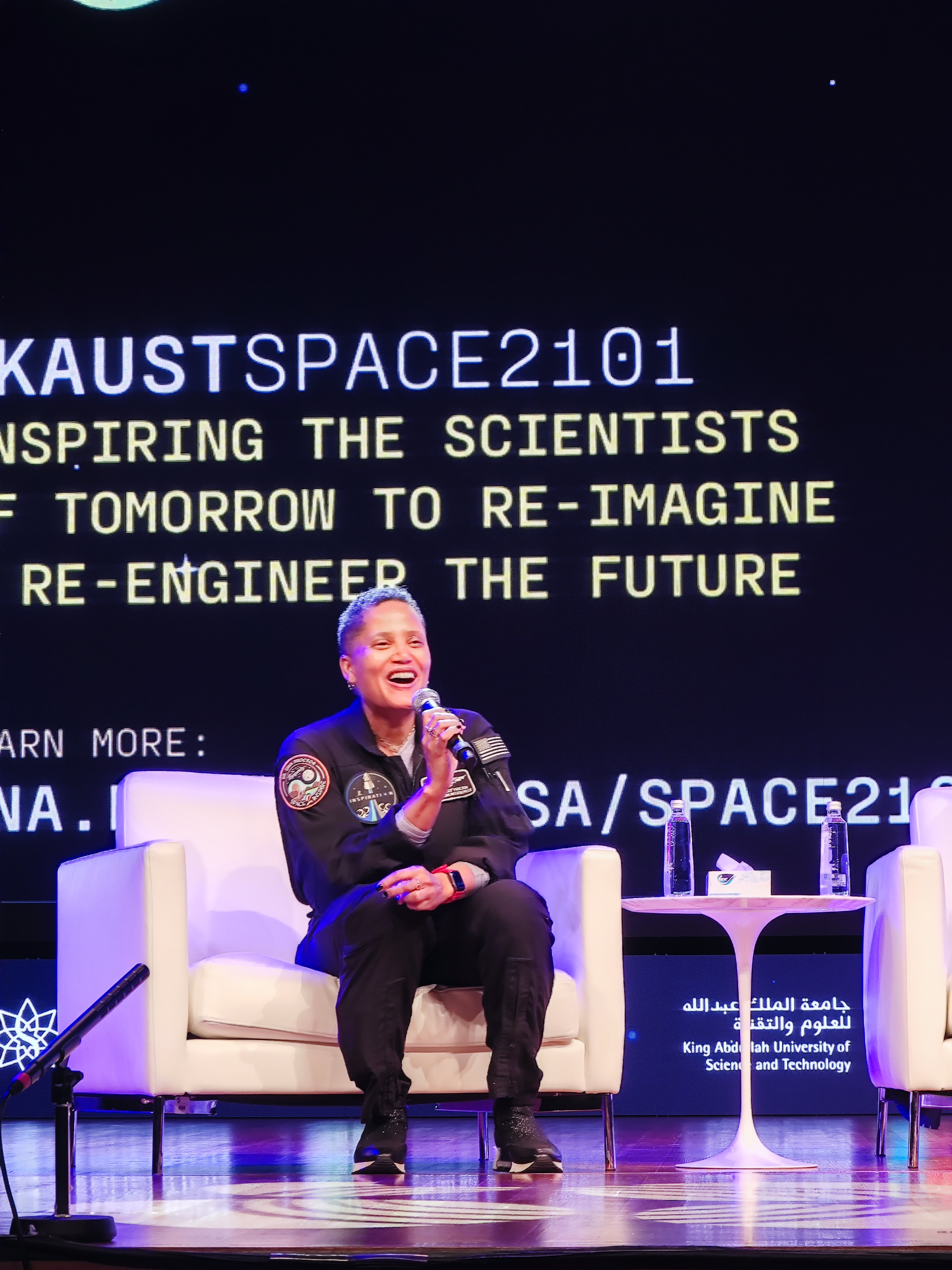
Sian Proctor during the space camp Space 2101 at the King Abdullah University of Science and Technology in 2023

She is an international speaker, communicating about science education, leadership, spacial simulations, sustainable foods and diversity in science. Furthermore, she has given several TEDx Talks. In 2025, her space flown pressure suit has been put on display at the Smithsonian Air and Space Museum in Washington DC.

== Art ==
Proctor is a life-long artist, painter, and poet. She is a noted Afrofuturist artist, working in digital, multi-media, and painting mediums. Proctor is known for her expressions of connection, source, and the divine that she calls AfroGaia. Following her spaceflight, her work frequently makes reference to and is inspired by the space orbit phenomenon of sunlight reflecting off the Earth and back into space and onto spacecraft and astronauts in orbit known as Earthlight. She is an artist-in-residence at Arizona State University. While aboard the orbiting Crew Dragon spaceship, she became the first African-American to paint in space.

== Filmography ==
Dr Proctor has made multiple appearances on television series and documentaries.

Year	Title	Role
2010	The Colony (American TV series) season 2	Contestant
2012	STEM Journals	Guest Scientist
2016	Genius by Stephen Hawking	Guest Scientist
2016	Science Channel Strange Evidence	Science Demonstrator
2020	Discovery+ Phantom Signals	Self
2021	Discovery+ Ancient Unexplained Files	Self
2021	History Channel When Big Things Go Wrong	Self
2022	Countdown: Inspiration4 Mission to Space	Self/astronaut

== Bibliography ==
=== Books ===
- EarthLight: The Power of EarthLight and the Human Perspective (2024) ISBN 1733765441
- Space2inspire: The Art of Inspiration (2022) ISBN 1733765425
- An Analog Astronaut Living and Cooking in a Simulated Mars Mission (2019) ISBN 1733765409
