= The Colony (American TV series) season 2 =

Coordinates: 29.951341°N 89.970091°W

The Colony
- Season 2
- No. of episodes: 10

Release
- Original network: Discovery Channel
- Original release: July 27 – September 28, 2010

Season chronology
- ← Previous; Season 1 Next → 3

The Colony is a dystopian drama set in a post apocalyptic USA where a viral outbreak has over taken the country. Season 2 was filmed in an area previously devastated by a hurricane, at and around 300-498 Southern Pl, Chalmette, Louisiana, and followed ten cast members in an environment that simulated life after a global catastrophe.

During the production of the season, experts from homeland security, engineering, psychology, and medicine were consulted to help create a realistic story line involving survivors of the "nuclear flu", a fictional mutation of the Avian flu. Dr. Ramesh Nathan was the infectious disease expert for the show.

== Cast ==
=== Original colonists ===
- Becka Adams, age 22, is a professional model, who grew up on a horse ranch in Colorado where her family raised Arabian horses.
- Jim Armistead, age 42, works as a carpenter by trade and is a general outdoorsman with an interest in disaster preparedness. His expertise is in water filtration, animal trapping, self-defense, and shelter creation.
- Sally Dawson, age 27, is an auto mechanic and owns her own garage. She was homeschooled and has no formal education beyond high school. She brings expertise in cars, engines, and self-defense.
- Robert Deville, age 70, is a retired building contractor. He brings expertise in the areas of construction and anything else involving a workshop.
- Sian Proctor, age 40, is geology professor at a community college in Arizona and specializes in geological hazards. She also has a pilot's license and loves math and science.
- Reno Ministrelli, age 29, is a construction foreman for a cellular tower company in Michigan. He also has skills in welding and carpentry.
- George Willis, age 46, is an industrial artist and architect who enjoys working with recycled materials. He is also a Red Cross disaster volunteer and is capable of providing emergency medical assistance.

=== Second wave (Episode 3 onwards) ===
- Michel Slover, age 40, is an anatomy, psychology and reflexology instructor at The Denver School of Massage Therapy in Aurora. He brings knowledge of the human immune system.
- Amber Williams, age 31, is a logging foreman for a log home construction company. She brings knowledge of home construction and is missing a portion of one of her fingers.

=== Third wave (Episode 7 onwards) ===
- Adam Ticknor, age 33, is a body language instructor, personal security specialist and a security expert who is a former reconnaissance Marine and sniper.

== Episode list ==
No.	Title	Original release date	Prod. code
1	"New Beginning"	July 27, 2010	TBA
Seven strangers are brought together to see if they can survive and rebuild after a global catastrophe. Attackers invade and steal valuable supplies.
2	"After the Fall"	August 3, 2010	TBA
The colonists work to create a source of electricity to power their equipment. Jim and Robert go hunting for food in the bayou near the colony.
3	"Trust"	August 10, 2010	TBA
As food resources begin to run low, two new colonists add further strain. Attackers are encountered while looking for additional supplies.
4	"To Have and Have Not"	August 17, 2010	TBA
The colonists start construction on a windmill to help alleviate the dwindling power supplies. A fire is started in the adjacent house and one of the colonists gets abducted.
5	"The Abduction"	August 24, 2010	TBA
The Colonists' negotiating skills are put to the test when one of their own is violently abducted and the ransom note demands their precious resources of medical supplies, fuel, and food in exchange to get back Becka.
6	"Skout"	August 31, 2010	TBA
The Colonists discover their water source has been heavily contaminated and a leadership issue breaks out. Reno comes up with a plan for a cool new ride while Jim and Michel try their hand at gator wrangling.
7	"Tick"	September 7, 2010	TBA
A stranger living on the Colony's fringes finally reveals himself and joins the colony
8	"Defense"	September 14, 2010	TBA
The Viral Outbreak Protection Agency (VOPA) returns with unexpected consequences. Focus then turns to arming the Colonists for an impending attack and to finalizing the scout boat for exploring the bayou in search of food, resources, and an escape.
9	"The Virus"	September 21, 2010	TBA
A militia of outsiders attacks the Colonists and their newly fortified compound. Then, the group divides, some taking the scout boat out to do reconnaissance for supplies and a place to escape to. But not everyone makes it back from the mission.
10	"Don't Look Back"	September 28, 2010	TBA
A counterstrike is executed against the militia, the colonists work on the escape boat, and face a difficult choice.

== Phases and projects ==
=== Episode 1 ===
- Shelter - the colonists select an abandoned two-story apartment building located behind the VOPA tent.
- Food - food collected from the VOPA tent includes canned food, rice, boxed whole milk, coffee, and other items.
- Water filtration - water from a nearby canal will be used by the colonists as a water source, after being filtered through layers of sand and charcoal and then boiled.
- Fire - a fire is started by using a spark created by jumper cables connected to car batteries. The fire is used for light, boiling water, and cooking.
- Fishing traps - the nearby canal is known to have fish, crab, and alligators. The colonists build a wire trap to try to catch food.
- Security - three strangers arrive on the compound looking for supplies, but the colonists confront them, give them some milk and send them away after a brief fight. Later, a militia of about 15 strangers approach the colonists looking for medical supplies, attacking with smoke bombs and pepper spray. The militia overwhelms the defenses of the colonists and takes a number of supplies. The colonists realize that they need to focus more effort on both offense and defense in the future.
- Contagion Isolation Tent - The colonists that contacted the strangers must be put in isolation for 12 hours and then tested for signs of the infection before rejoining the group. Unaffected by the virus, all colonists are allowed to have contact with everyone.
- Nails: The group tries to find nails in order to start on the construction of their fishing traps.
- Training: The Colonists previous training from their careers and hobbies comes into play a lot in this episode, giving special praise to Reno's construction abilities.
- Rain Catching - A rain storm allows the colonists to collect 90 gallons of rain water in various buckets around their land.

=== Episode 2 ===
- Electricity: Sally obtains an alternator and generator from abandoned vehicles, and designs a schematic for producing electricity using the hardware of a diesel tractor.
- Fuel: The colonists, drawing on Deville's experience on a farm, work on creating fuel by rendering the fat of rotting pigs found in an abandoned truck. The fuel was used to provide electricity for power tools used for construction
- Food: Jim works on creating a bridge to cross the canal to allow for easier fishing, but it breaks when Deville is crossing it.
- Trapping: Jim & Deville create spears and go into the bayou to hunt snakes & fish.
- Defense: The colonists begin working on barricading their shelter, but are stalled when their power tools die.

=== Episode 3 ===
- Sanitation: A hole is cut into the bottom of the filled portapotty and converted into an outhouse by allowing it to empty directly into a hole in the ground.
- Metal forge: Power tools are used to construct a bellows and a furnace to allow the construction of other tools and weapons.
- Food smoker: A smoker is constructed entirely out of wood, to try to preserve food without refrigeration. It catches fire and part of it is burnt away. It is later fixed but fails to properly preserve the fish, the meat going to waste.
- Shower: A shower stall is constructed out of wood and an old bathtub to allow the colonists to have a way to clean themselves.
- Outsiders: Two friendly new colonists arrive (Michael and Amber) and are allowed to move into a neighboring building.
- Trading negotiation: Traders on a boat come offering fruit, a generator, welder, medical supplies, soap, fish, and other supplies. Michael and Amber contribute some of their supplies to facilitate the trade, and are welcomed into the group.
- Root cellar: A plastic cooler is buried in a hole in the ground by Amber to attempt to store the leftover fish soup, but she failed to dig down far enough to make a proper root cellar. The food went bad and attracted ants.
- Machete: The metal forge is used to flatten and temper a piece of sheet metal into a machete. Metal arrowheads and other metal items begin to also be constructed.
- Scavenging: Tools, gas cans, nails and some other items are found in an abandoned warehouse just prior to being chased off by other three outsiders with cattle prods.

=== Episode 4 ===
- Defense: While the old house of Michael and Amber is on fire, they see a person running around their base and looting many of their resources, which leads them to install fencing around the helipad and close the gate with a heavy chain they found while scavenging the bayou.
- Shelter: While the rain is pouring down on the Colonists, they discover a number of leaks in their roof, leading Reno and Robert to try to nail a tarp down onto the roof to try to stop the rain from leaking into their house, but this does not work.
- Sanitation: The colonists use the heavy rain as an opportunity to bathe.
- Outsiders: While on their way back from the bayou, Michael, Amber, and Jim find a downed airplane, being scoured by other survivors, but the scavengers just flee.
- Scavenging: While hunting for food, Michael, Jim, and Amber find a downed plane and take its motor, and many scrap metal pieces from it. They also bring back a parachute found in a nearby tree. Michael also finds a turtle in the bayou, but no other food is found.
- Food: The Colonists are starved, which leads Becka to go out and scavenge for berries by herself, which leads to her abduction.

=== Episode 5 ===
- Electricity: Using scavenged parts, the colonists construct a wind turbine on the roof of their house, connected to an alternator allowing them to generate renewable energy.
- Negotiation: The colonists have to negotiate with outsiders for the return of Becka in exchange for food and medical supplies.
- Emotion: Becka, as well as the other colonists have to deal with the mental strain of the abduction, thus causing more problems than needed.

=== Episode 6 ===
- Water: Robert creates a cistern to hold rainwater to provide the colonists with sufficient drinking water.
- Scout Vehicle: Reno works on building a trike using a metal frame and cart attached to an old motorcycle.
- Food: Jim and Michel catch an alligator providing a source of food for the colonists.
- Leadership: The colonists vote Sally as their leader through a secret ballot.
- Security: Michel was placed on night watch and went to sleep, looters came in, but took nothing.

=== Episode 7 ===
- Security: Robert constructs a wooden observation platform on the roof of the house.
- Transportation: Amber begins to prepare a speed boat to patrol the canals and water ways, while Sally and the other colonists begin preparing another boat for escape purposes.
- Fuel: Michel begins to build a distiller that will be used to ferment yeast and other chemicals to create ethanol to power the escape boat.
- Food: A stranger who has been observing the colony for over thirty days invites them to a feast.
- Outsider: The man, named Tick, is friendly and is invited to stay with the colony.

=== Episode 8 ===
- Food: A VOPA helicopter drops a crate of food and water outside the colonist compound. Tick, Jim and a few colonists encounter another group of strangers at the drop zone, trying to make off with the supplies and a fight ensues.
- Emotion: The colonists discover an iPod Touch with the food supplies, with videos of their loved ones.
- Security: Tick creates a security plan for the compound. George, Jim and Michel begin fashioning riot shields as a form of protection against hostiles. Jim meanwhile begins work on a water-pressured hose as a weapon to ward off intruders.
- Transportation: Robert starts to work attaching tires to the tractor that will be used to help transport the escape boat. Amber and George also work on the propeller using scavenged hardwood. The patrol boat is tested in the canal.
- Fuel: Michel's distiller produces its first results.

=== Episode 9 ===
- Security: The colonists supervised by Tick ward off an attack by a militia of 21 people and prevent them from entering the house and stealing their possessions.
- Exploration: Tick, Jim, Michel and Amber head out to the bayou using the patrol boat. They encounter a house in the fishing camp area that they feel is much better habitat and easier to defend than their current location.
- Transportation : Sally rebuilds the airplane engine that will be used to power the escape boat.
- Food: Tick and Jim begin to scout the surrounding areas of the bayou and catch a couple of snakes, nutria and crabs that will feed the colonists.
- Contagion: Amber and Michel are infected by the virus and are forced to leave the rest of the colonists. They leave their possessions behind for the rest of the colonists to use them.
- Militia Camp: Tick and Jim track down a militia member to their lair and headquarters.

=== Episode 10 ===
- Transportation: The colonists complete the finishing touches to the escape boat. Reno constructs a railing and bench sitting area in the boat. George, Sian and Sally complete the rudder and throttle system for the boat.
- Militia Camp: Tick, Jim, Reno and Becka infiltrate the militia camp and retrieve food cans and gas canisters.
- VOPA: Two VOPA trucks arrive at the colony, with the intention of picking up 2 colonists, but only Sian wants to leave them. Becka questions Deville numerous times, asking him if he wishes to leave with them on the VOPA truck but Deville refuses, leading to a mild confrontation. Muffled screams are heard as the trucks drive away.
- Militia Attack: The militia launches an attack on the colony just as the colonists are about to leave. The militia set their abandoned house on fire.
- Escape: The colonists immediately escape on the boat to the bayou. When they get to the house on the fishing camp in the bayou, there is a large group of armed militia waiting at the docks. The colonists' fate is unknown.
