= Inspiration4 =

2021 private crewed spaceflight

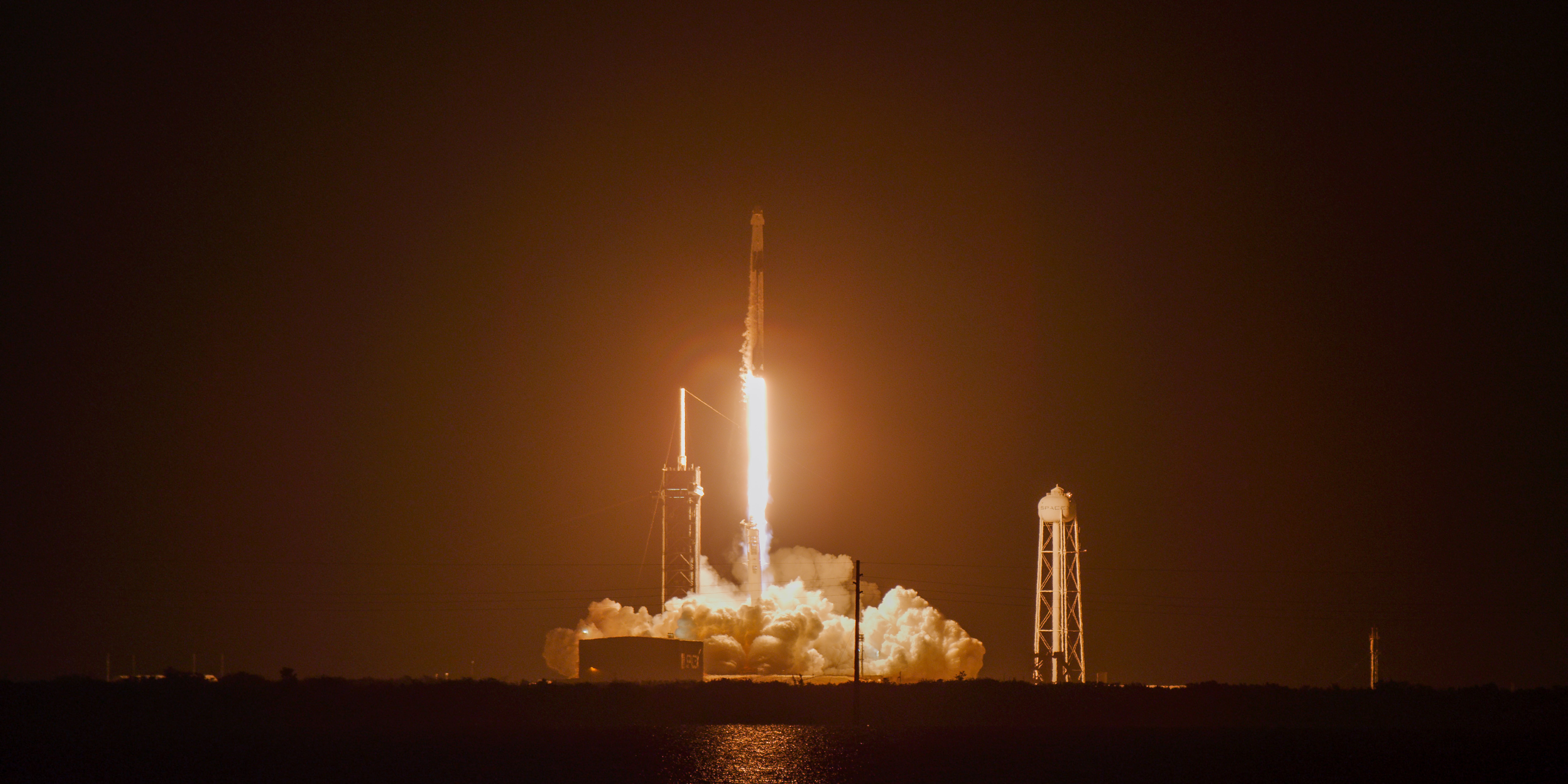
- Launch of Inspiration4 on a Falcon 9
- Mission type: Private spaceflight
- Operator: SpaceX
- COSPAR ID: 2021-084A
- SATCAT no.: 49220
- Website: inspiration4.com
- Mission duration: 2 days 23 hours 3 minutes 53 seconds

Spacecraft properties
- Spacecraft: Crew Dragon Resilience
- Spacecraft type: Crew Dragon
- Manufacturer: SpaceX
- Launch mass: 12,519 kg (27,600 lb)
- Landing mass: 9,616 kg (21,200 lb)

Crew
- Members: Jared Isaacman; Sian Proctor; Hayley Arceneaux; Christopher Sembroski

Start of mission
- Launch date: September 16, 2021, 00:02:56 UTC (September 15, 10:02:56 pm EDT)
- Rocket: Falcon 9 Block 5 B1062-3
- Launch site: Kennedy, LC‑39A

End of mission
- Recovered by: MV GO Searcher
- Landing date: September 18, 2021, 23:06:49 UTC (07:06:49 pm EDT)
- Landing site: Atlantic Ocean, near Cape Canaveral, Florida (28.8°N 80.3°W)

Orbital parameters
- Reference system: Geocentric orbit
- Regime: Low Earth orbit
- Altitude: 585 km (364 mi)
- Inclination: 51.6°
- Period: 96.2 minutes
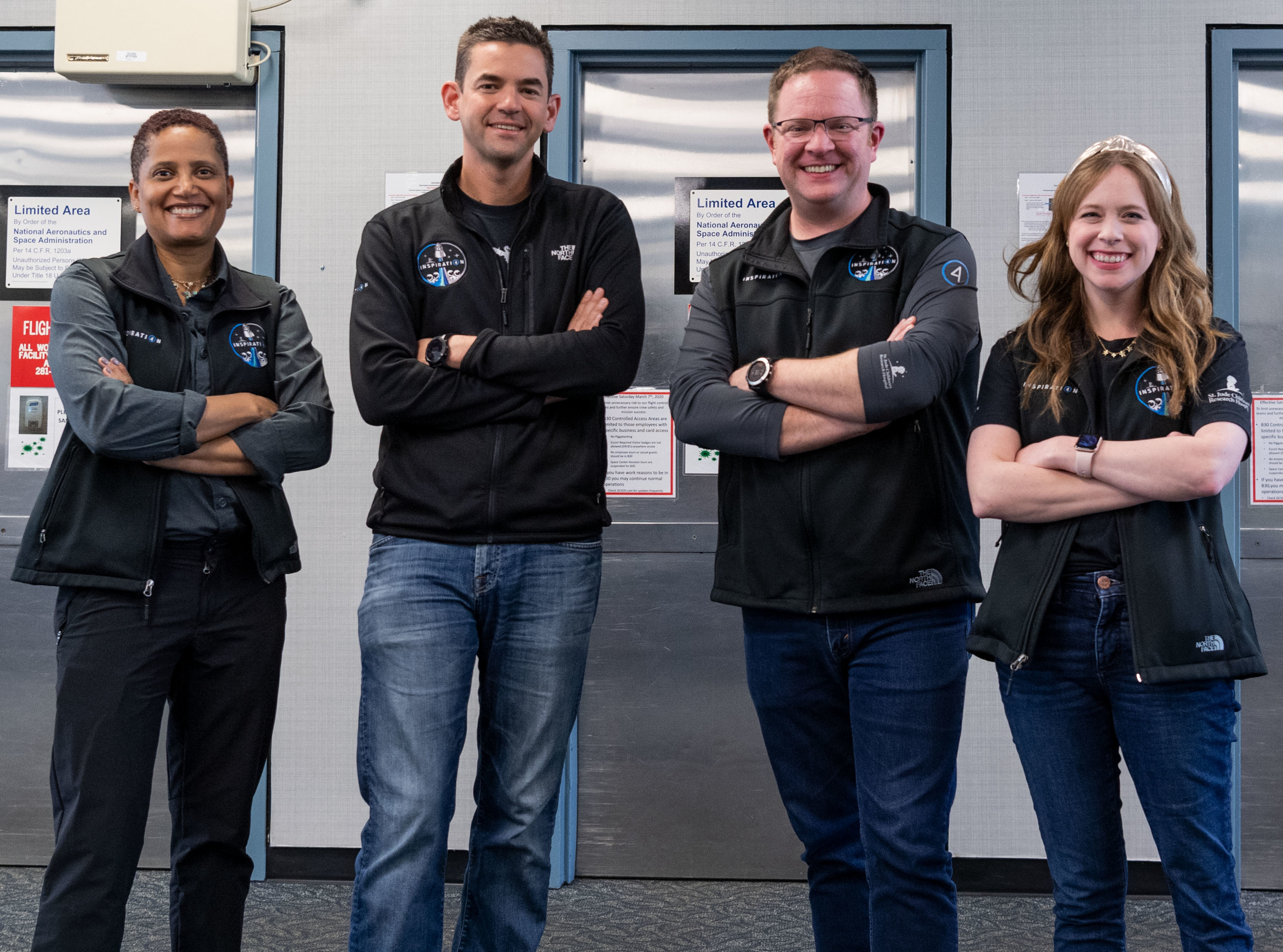
- Inspiration4 mission patches (SpaceX patch on right) From left: Proctor, Isaacman, Sembroski and Arceneaux Crew Dragon flights

Inspiration4 (stylized as Inspirati④n) was a 2021 human spaceflight operated by SpaceX on behalf of Shift4 Payments CEO Jared Isaacman. The mission launched the Crew Dragon Resilience on September 16, 2021, at 00:02:56 UTC (Note: September 15, 2021, 20:02:56 Eastern Daylight Time (EDT)) from Kennedy Space Center's Launch Complex 39A atop a Falcon 9 launch vehicle. It placed the Dragon capsule into a low Earth orbit. The mission ended on September 18, 2021, at 23:06:49 UTC, when Resilience splashed down in the Atlantic Ocean.

The trip was the first orbital spaceflight with only private citizens aboard and was part of a charitable effort on behalf of St. Jude Children's Research Hospital in Memphis, Tennessee. Isaacman was named mission commander. The hospital selected two commercial astronauts: cancer survivor Hayley Arceneaux and military veteran Christopher Sembroski. Shift4 selected entrepreneur Sian Proctor, who was named pilot.

The mission overlapped with the 55th anniversary of Gemini 11, which in September 1966 had an apogee of approximately 1,368 km (850 mi), the highest Earth orbit ever reached on a crewed flight until Polaris Dawn in 2024, which was also operated by SpaceX on behalf of Isaacman. The Inspiration4 flight reached an orbital altitude of approximately 585 km (364 mi), the highest achieved since STS-103 in 1999 and the fifth-highest Earth orbital human spaceflight overall. By comparison, the International Space Station is at 408 km (254 mi). The Inspiration4 mission concluded with the first crewed splashdown in the Atlantic Ocean since Apollo 9 in 1969.

== Trip and crew ==
Inspiration4 was the first human spaceflight to orbit Earth with only private citizens on board nicknamed Amateur astronaut. (Note: Many sources use the term "all-civilian". The Washington Post clarified its use of this term in one of its headlines when it later said "comprised entirely of civilians – nongovernment astronauts".) The trip promoted and raised money for St. Jude Children's Research Hospital. The crew and trip intended to raise upwards of US$100 million to expand St. Jude's childhood cancer research. Isaacman and his wife, Monica, personally donated US$125 million to the hospital, and contributions by SpaceX founder Elon Musk (US$55 million) and many others ultimately raised the total given to St. Jude to more than US$243 million, far more than initial target amount.

Inspiration4 was led by Shift4 Payments CEO Jared Isaacman, an experienced pilot with qualification in military jets. Isaacman procured the flight and its four seats from SpaceX and donated two of the seats to St. Jude. Hayley Arceneaux, a physician assistant at the hospital and a survivor of bone cancer, was selected by the hospital to board the flight. St. Jude raffled the second seat as part of a successful campaign to raise US$200 million for the hospital, termed St. Jude Mission: Inspired. A raffle draw competition was held, in which entrants needed to be a US citizen and had to donate a significant amount of money between US$10 to US$10,000. Kyle Hippchen, from Embry–Riddle Aeronautical University, donated US$600 and ultimately won the raffle but decided to give the seat to his friend, U.S. Air Force veteran Christopher Sembroski, who had also entered the raffle by donating US$50. Hippchen weighed in over the allowed limit. Entrepreneur Sian Proctor was selected by Shift4 Payments to board the flight through a competition modeled after Shark Tank that rewarded the best business idea to make use of Shift4's commerce solutions. The panelists in the competition included Salesforce CEO Marc Benioff, Fast Company editor Stephanie Mehta, former NASA engineer Mark Rober and Bar Rescue host Jon Taffer.

Resilience was the first spacecraft to orbit with an all-rookie crew since Shenzhou 7 in 2008. The last time NASA launched an all-rookie orbital crew was STS-2 in 1981. (Note: STS-2 Commander Joe Engle was a NASA space flight rookie, but had been awarded U.S. Air Force Astronaut wings for passing 50 mi (80 km) while flying the X-15 rocket plane.)

All four received commercial astronaut training by SpaceX. The training included lessons in orbital mechanics, operating in a microgravity environment, stress testing, emergency-preparedness training and mission simulations.

Position	Crew
Commander	Jared Isaacman; First spaceflight
Pilot	Sian Proctor; First spaceflight
Medical officer	Hayley Arceneaux; First spaceflight
Payload specialist	Christopher Sembroski; First spaceflight

== Spacecraft ==
Artist's rendering of Resilience for Inspiration4, with its nose cone open, revealing the cupola

The Inspiration4 mission was the second flight of Resilience, following its use for Crew-1. It also marked the fourth crewed flight of a Crew Dragon. The spacecraft's docking adapter, normally used to dock with the International Space Station, was replaced for this mission by a single monolithic multi-layer domed plexiglass window inspired by the Cupola module, allowing 360° views outside Resilience's nose. The cupola was protected during launch and re-entry by the spacecraft's retractable nosecone, which also housed a custom camera, enabling photography of the vehicle's interior and exterior during flight. The cupola is removable so that Resilience can easily be reconfigured for missions in the future that require docking. Four Draco thrusters on the spacecraft's nose necessitated the installation of four heat shield tiles on the cupola's exterior, which protected the plexiglass dome from engine exhaust during propulsive maneuvers.

== Flight ==
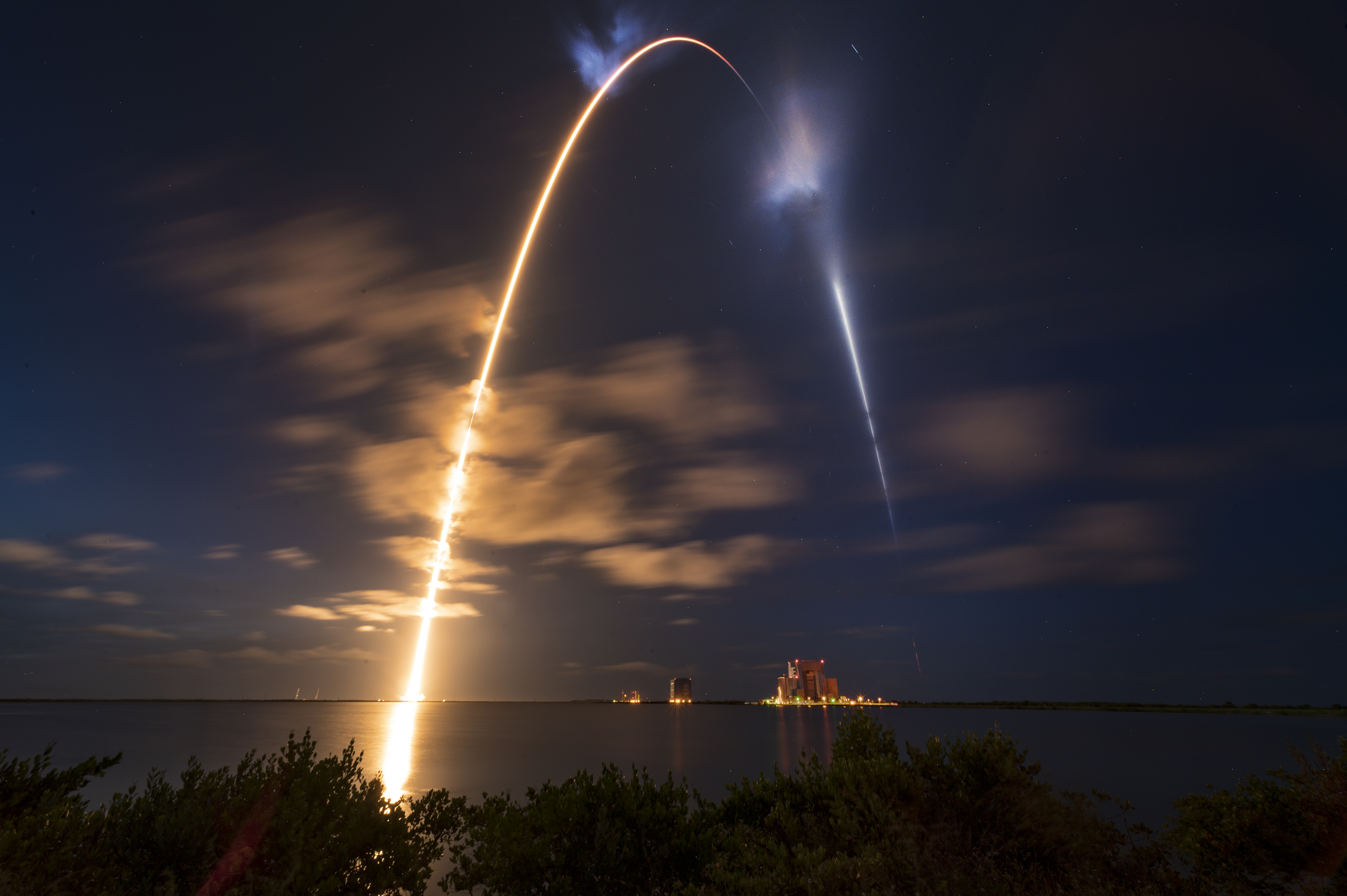
The launch of Inspiration4

Resilience launched on September 16, 2021, at 00:02:56 UTC (September 15, 2021, at 20:02:56 EDT) atop Falcon 9 Block 5 booster B1062 from Kennedy Space Center's Launch Complex 39A. It was the third flight of this booster. The spacecraft was launched into an inclination of 51.6°. Coincidentally, Resilience's orbit is in the same orbital plane as the ISS's orbit. With Resilience in orbit, three Dragon spacecraft were simultaneously orbiting Earth, as Endeavour flies the Crew-2 mission, and C208 flies the CRS-23 mission. Inspiration4 was the first crewed orbital spaceflight since STS-125 in 2009 to not visit a space station.

Each crew member was assigned an individual call sign for communications. Isaacman's call sign was "Rook", Proctor's was "Leo", Arceneaux's was "Nova" and Sembroski's was "Hanks".

As the second-stage engine of SpaceX's Falcon 9 rocket cut off, Arceneaux reached into a pouch strapped to her leg and pulled out a plush toy dog that represents the therapy dogs employed by St. Jude. The toy, attached to a tether, began to float above Arceneaux's head and in doing so fulfilled its purpose as the Inspiration4 mission's "zero-g indicator". Hanging in the air, it provided a visual signal to Arceneaux and her three crewmates that they were now in the microgravity environment of outer space after reaching Earth orbit on September 16, 2021.

The mission planned to include ultrasounds, microbe samples and a variety of in-flight health experiments (measure fluid shifts, record ECG activity, blood oxygen levels, heart rates, etc.) on the human bodies of ordinary citizens who have not been previously carefully screened and exhaustively trained as professional astronauts. The study of the effects of spaceflight on human health and performance was done in collaboration with SpaceX, the Translational Research Institute for Space Health (TRISH) at Baylor College of Medicine and investigators at Weill Cornell Medicine. During the journey, an alarm had sounded and was found to be associated with an apparent toilet malfunction. The physiological changes in the SpaceX Inspiration4 civilian crew have been described by Jones and colleagues in the journal Nature.

On September 18, 2021, at 23:06:49 UTC, Resilience splashed down in the Atlantic Ocean north of Cape Canaveral and was picked up by recovery ship GO Searcher roughly forty minutes afterward. Arceneaux was first to exit the spacecraft, followed by Proctor, Sembroski and Isaacman.

=== Orbital altitude ===
External videos
- Launch and splashdown of the Inspiration4 mission on YouTube
- Inspiration4 | Launch
- Splashdown

The flight plan aimed for an altitude of at least 575 km (357 mi) and reached an altitude of 585 km (364 mi), a height surpassing STS-48 in 1991, which had an apogee of 580 km (360 mi), and the highest crewed spaceflight since STS-103 in 1999 with an apogee of 610 km (380 mi). STS-31, the launch of the Hubble Space Telescope at 621 km (386 mi) was the highest of the Space Shuttle program and fourth highest ever behind only two missions of the Gemini Program, Gemini 10 and Gemini 11 in 1966 with apogees of 756 km (470 mi) and 1,368 km (850 mi) respectively, and Polaris Dawn's 1,400 km (870 mi) apogee, making Inspiration4 the sixth highest Earth orbital crewed spaceflight in history; only 10 Apollo launches and the Artemis II mission went beyond Earth's orbit. Achieving this altitude exposed the craft and crew to different radiation levels than those found on the International Space Station. The investigation of the effects of spaceflight on human health and performance was done in collaboration with SpaceX, the Translational Research Institute for Space Health (TRISH) at Baylor College of Medicine, and investigators at Weill Cornell Medicine.

Inspiration4 orbited at this altitude for two days and then lowered its altitude to about 365 km (227 mi), which it kept during the final day of the mission, in preparation for the re-entry and landing.

== Media coverage ==
Media coverage of the mission has been widely positive, noting its charitable focus, duration and altitude achieved. The mission was documented in real time in a five-episode docuseries entitled Countdown: Inspiration4 Mission to Space, released on the subscription streaming service Netflix in September 2021. The crew also starred in a Netflix special named "A StoryBots Space Adventure" released also in Netflix. The special is also posted in Youtube.

== See also ==
- Space tourism
- Axiom Mission 1
- Space Adventures Crew Dragon mission
- Polaris program
- List of fully civilian crewed orbital spaceflights
- Timeline of private spaceflight
