= SpaceX Crew-1 =

2020 American crewed spaceflight to the ISS and maiden flight of Crew Dragon Resilience

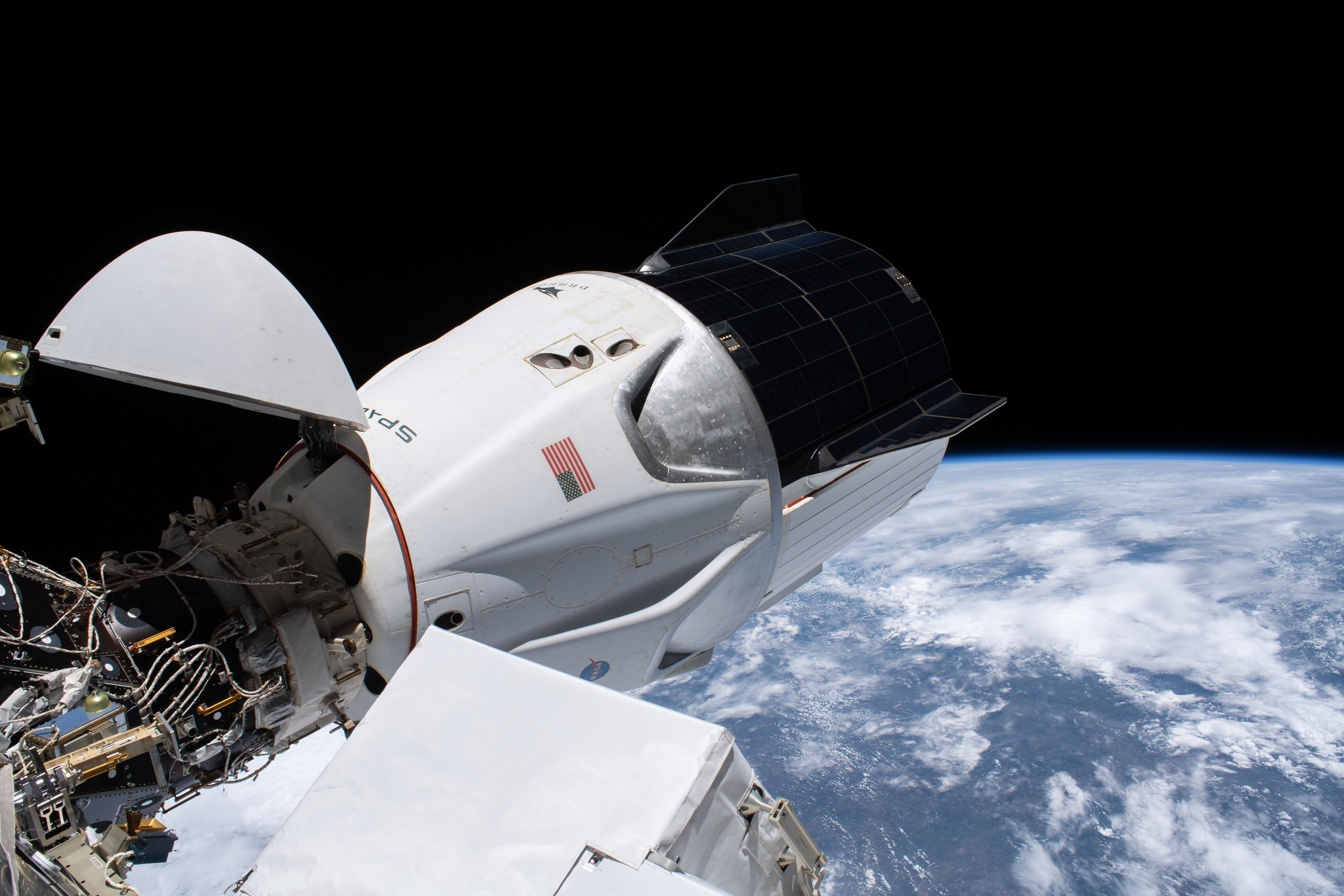
- Resilience docked to the International Space Station.
- Names: USCV-1 (2012–2019); Crew-1
- Mission type: ISS crew transport
- Operator: SpaceX
- COSPAR ID: 2020-084A
- SATCAT no.: 46920
- Mission duration: 167 days, 6 hours, 29 minutes, 16 seconds

Spacecraft properties
- Spacecraft: Crew Dragon Resilience
- Spacecraft type: Crew Dragon
- Manufacturer: SpaceX
- Launch mass: 12,519 kg (27,600 lb)
- Landing mass: 9,616 kg (21,200 lb)

Crew
- Crew size: 4
- Members: Mike Hopkins; Victor Glover; Soichi Noguchi; Shannon Walker
- Expedition: Expedition 64/65

Start of mission
- Launch date: November 16, 2020, 00:27:17 UTC (November 15, 7:27:17 pm EST)
- Rocket: Falcon 9 Block 5 B1061-1
- Launch site: Kennedy, LC‑39A

End of mission
- Recovered by: MV GO Navigator
- Landing date: May 2, 2021, 06:56:33 UTC (2:56:33 am EDT)
- Landing site: Gulf of Mexico, near Panama City, Florida (29°44′50″N 85°59′03″W)

Orbital parameters
- Reference system: Geocentric orbit
- Regime: Low Earth orbit
- Inclination: 51.66°

Docking with ISS
- Docking port: Harmony forward
- Docking date: November 17, 2020, 04:01 UTC
- Undocking date: April 5, 2021, 10:30 UTC
- Time docked: 139 days, 6 hours, 29 minutes

Docking with ISS (relocation) (Note: From an orbital dynamics perspective, the forward port is easier to approach, and therefore new vehicles use this approach for their first live docking. The Crew Dragon Endeavor made its second docking on Crew-2 on May 2, 2021; therefore, Crew-1 relocated to the zenith port to clear the forward port for Crew-2.)
- Docking port: Harmony zenith
- Docking date: April 5, 2021, 11:08 UTC
- Undocking date: May 2, 2021, 00:35 UTC
- Time docked: 26 days, 13 hours, 27 minutes
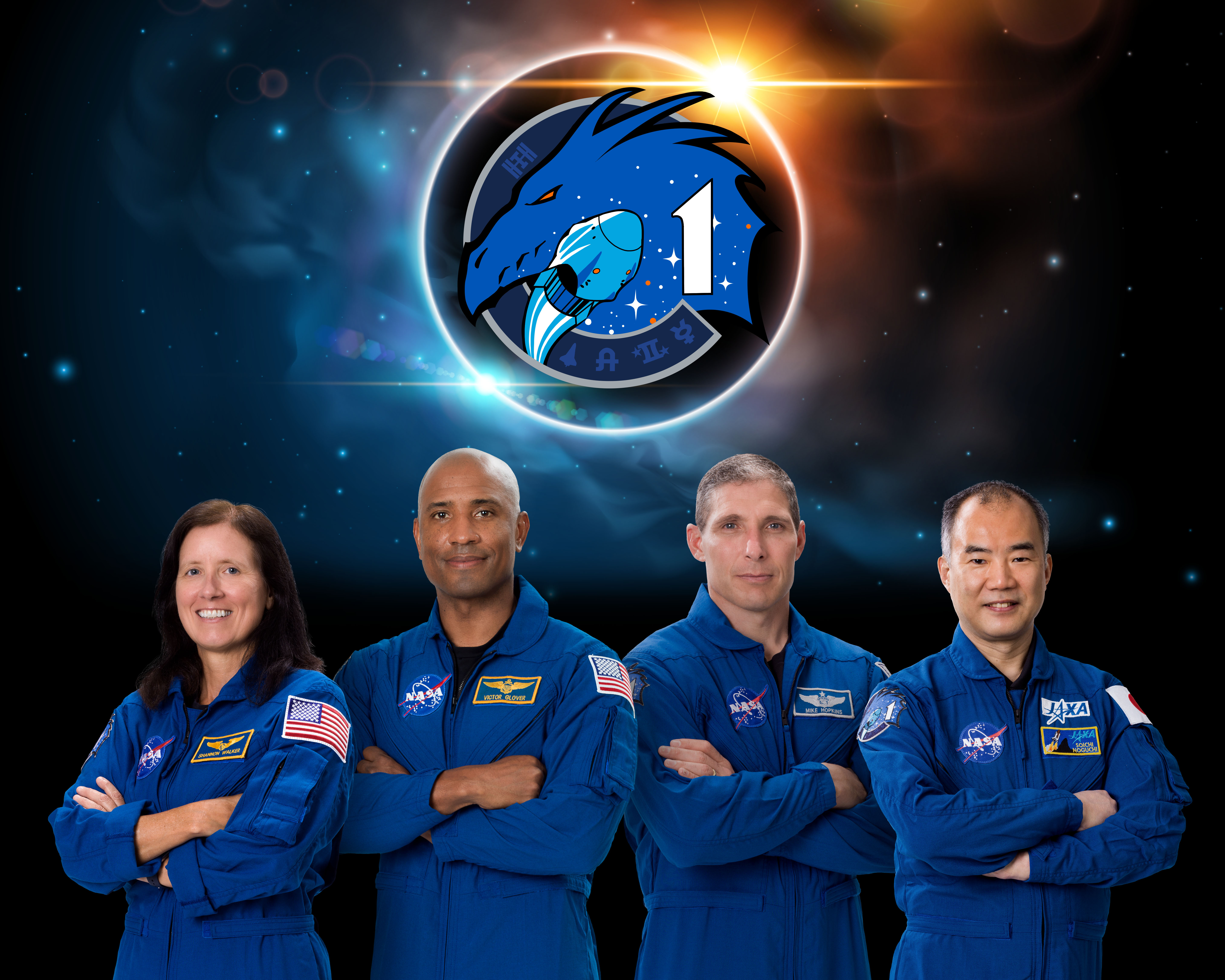
- NASA (left), SpaceX (middle), and JAXA (right) mission patches From left: Walker, Glover, Hopkins and Noguchi Commercial Crew Program Crew Dragon flights

SpaceX Crew-1 (also known as USCV-1 or simply Crew-1) was the first operational (Note: The Crew Dragon Demo-2 mission was the first crewed flight, but was considered as a test flight, not an operational flight) crewed flight of a Crew Dragon spacecraft and the maiden flight of the Crew Dragon Resilience spacecraft. It was also the second crewed orbital flight launch by the United States since that of STS-135 in July 2011. Resilience launched on November 16, 2020, at 00:27:17 UTC (Note: 15 November 2020 19:27:17 Eastern Standard Time (EST), 16 November 2020 00:27:17 UTC) on a Falcon 9 from Kennedy Space Center Launch Complex 39A (LC-39A), carrying NASA astronauts Mike Hopkins, Victor Glover and Shannon Walker, along with JAXA astronaut Soichi Noguchi, all members of the Expedition 64 crew. The mission was the second overall crewed orbital flight of the Crew Dragon.

Crew-1 was the first operational mission to the International Space Station (ISS) in the Commercial Crew Program. Originally designated "USCV-1" by NASA in 2012, the launch date was delayed several times from the original date of November 2016. The mission was scheduled to depart the ISS on April 28, 2021, but due to weather returned to Earth on May 2, 2021. The capsule splashed down at 06:56:33 UTC, to be reused on Inspiration4. It was the first nighttime splashdown for NASA astronauts since Apollo 8 in 1968. On February 7, 2021, the Crew-1 broke the record for the longest spaceflight by a U.S. crewed vehicle, surpassing the 84-day mark set by an Apollo capsule on the final flight to the Skylab (Skylab-4) space station on February 8, 1974.

== Background ==
The first operational mission in the Commercial Crew Program, originally designated "USCV-1" (United States Crew Vehicle-mission 1) by NASA, was initially announced in November 2012, with a launch date set for November 2016. In April 2013, it was announced that the launch would be delayed by one year to November 2017. It was then delayed into 2019 and 2020, pending the success of the uncrewed and crewed demonstration missions, respectively. Following the Crew Dragon Demonstration Mission 2, Crew-1 was tentatively scheduled for September 2020; further delays occurred to align with the ongoing COVID-19 pandemic restrictions and their impact on the schedule of ISS crew rotations and cargo delivery missions, and then again because of concerns about an issue with the gas generators on the Merlin 1D engines.

On September 29, 2020, mission commander Mike Hopkins revealed during a NASA press conference that the capsule's crew had chosen to name it Resilience. Due to the COVID-19 pandemic in Florida, the Kennedy Space Center Visitor Complex only allowed a few people to watch the launch in person from the KSC premises.

== Crew ==
NASA astronauts Mike Hopkins and Victor Glover were announced as the crew on August 3, 2018. JAXA astronaut Soichi Noguchi and the third NASA astronaut, Shannon Walker, were added to the crew on March 31, 2020.

Prime crew
Position	Astronaut
Commander	Mike Hopkins, NASA; Expedition 64/65; Second and last spaceflight
Pilot	Victor Glover, NASA; Expedition 64/65; First spaceflight
Mission specialist	Soichi Noguchi, JAXA; Expedition 64/65; Third and last spaceflight
Mission specialist	Shannon Walker, NASA; Expedition 64/65; Second and last spaceflight

Backup crew
Position	Astronaut
Commander	Kjell N. Lindgren, NASA
Mission specialist	Koichi Wakata, JAXA

== Preparations ==
Crew-1's Falcon 9 launch vehicle arrived at Cape Canaveral, Florida, on July 14, 2020. Crew Dragon capsule C207 arrived at SpaceX processing facilities in Florida, on August 18, 2020. The successful launch of the Falcon 9 launch vehicle from Cape Canaveral Air Force Station (CCAFS) on November 5, 2020, was a milestone leading up to the Crew-1 mission. Falcon 9 successfully deployed a GPS navigation satellite (GPS III-04) for the United States Space Force (USSF), confirming that engineers had resolved an issue with Merlin 1D engines that delayed the GPS mission and the Crew-1 flight.

The crew arrived at Kennedy Space Center via a NASA Gulfstream jet on November 8, 2020, at 13:53 UTC. A Flight Readiness Review (FRR) convened by NASA officials was scheduled on November 10, 2020, to discuss unresolved technical issues, review the status of launch preparations, and give approval for teams to proceed with the Crew-1 mission. NASA officials gave approval on November 10, 2020, for SpaceX to begin regular crew rotation flights to the International Space Station, signaling a transition from development to operations for the human-rated Crew Dragon spacecraft. The launch vehicle was lifted to its vertical position on the pad for a test firing of its Merlin-1D main engines on November 11, 2020, at 20:49 UTC. A dry dress rehearsal (DDR) on November 12, 2020, saw the crew put on their pressure suits and climb into Resilience. SpaceX ran a launch readiness review (LRR) on November 13, 2020.

== Mission ==
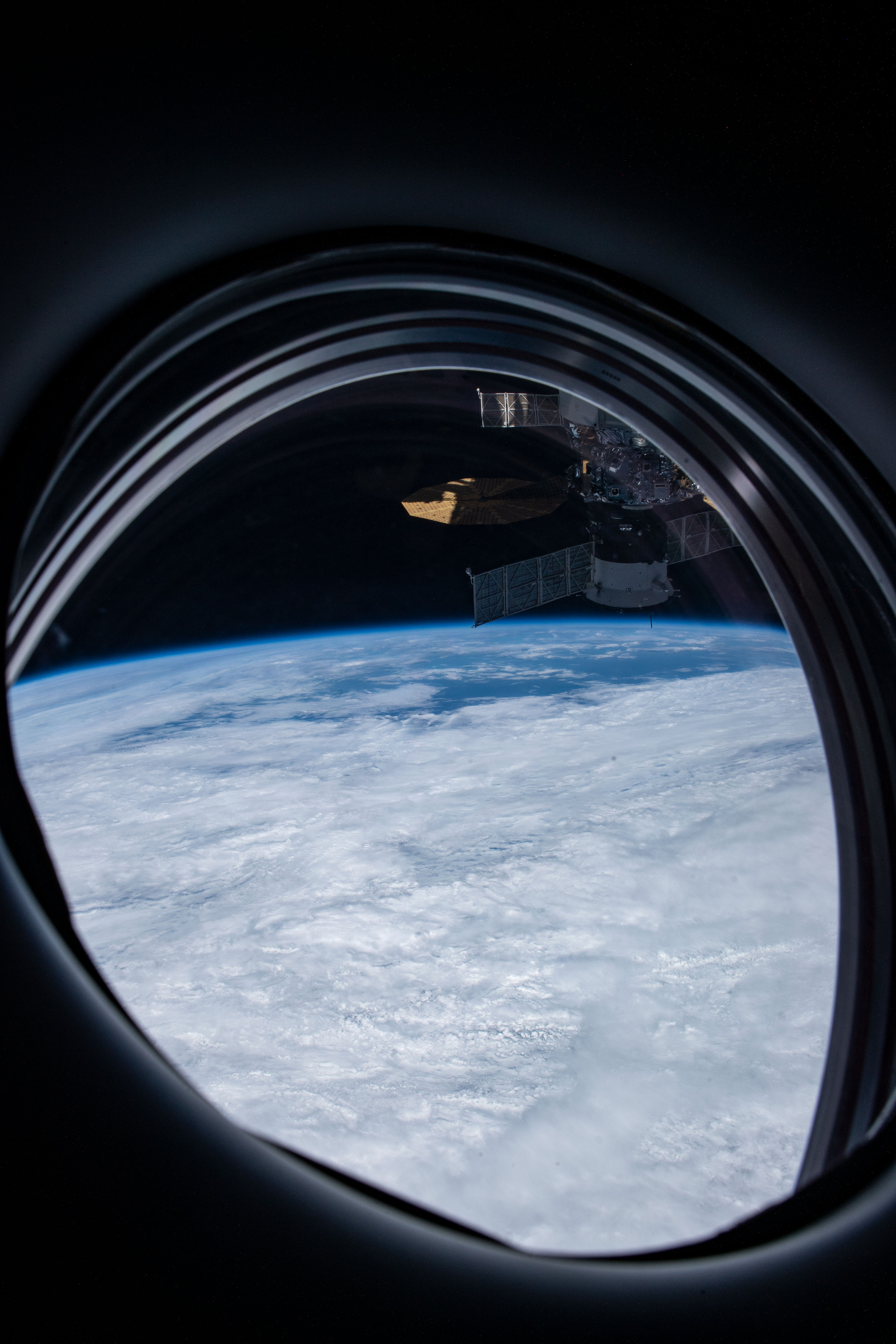
A window view of Earth from the Dragon 2 capsule during Expedition 64

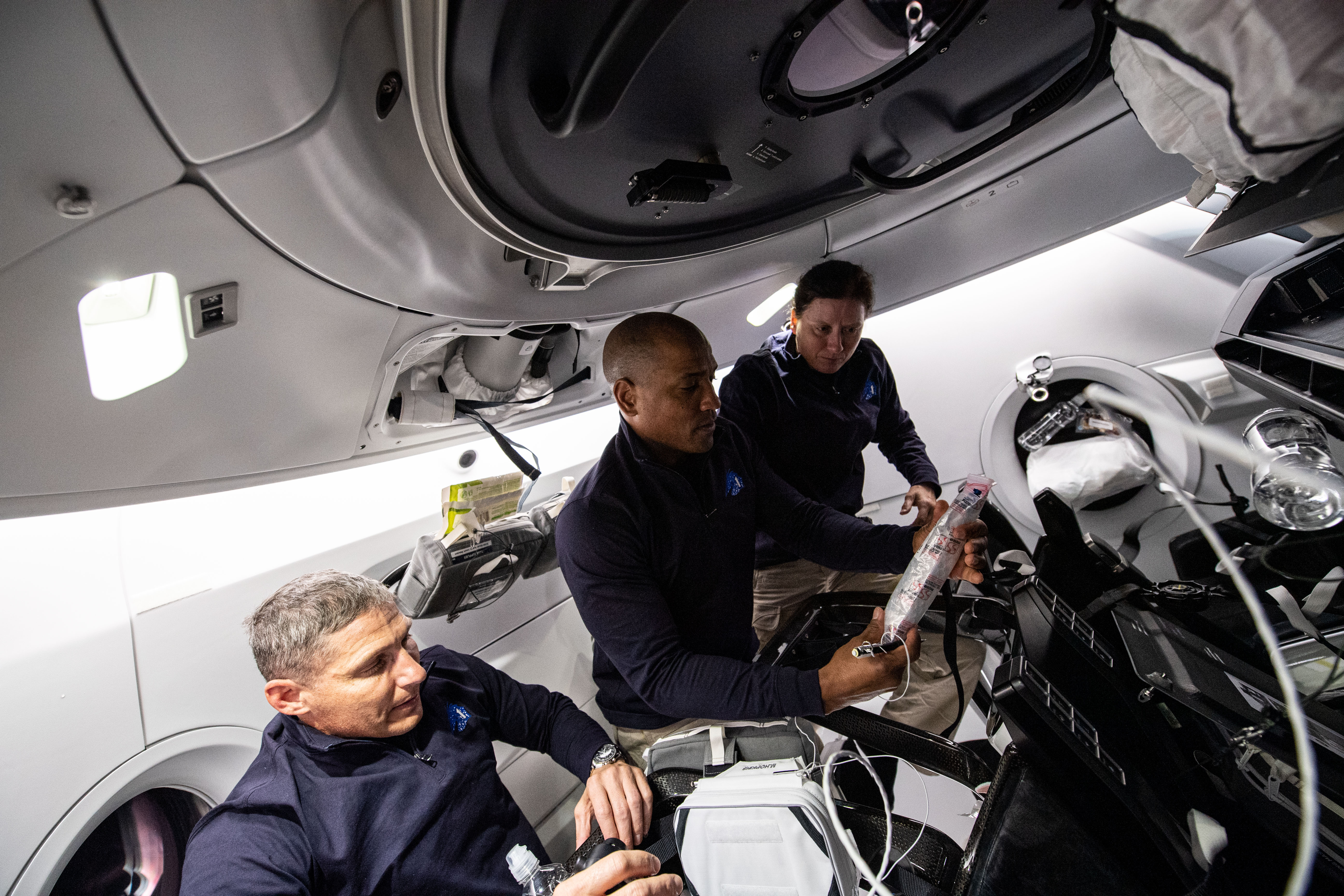
The crew inside the capsule during the rendezvous process

Launch of the Crew-1 mission

On November 15, 2020, final pre-launch preparations were completed. The hatch of Resilience was closed at 22:32 UTC, but reopened briefly after a slight drop in pressure was detected. Troubleshooting the hatch seal led to discovery of a small amount of foreign object debris (FOD) in the seal. The hatch was then closed again, and mission controllers proceeded with the countdown. No further concerns were noted, and on November 16, 2020, at 00:27:17 UTC, Resilience lifted off successfully. Its Falcon 9 first-stage booster, SN B1061.1, landed on the autonomous spaceport drone ship Just Read the Instructions. The astronauts entered a stable orbit after about nine minutes. For this mission, the crew had chosen a plush toy of "The Child" (also known as "Baby Yoda") from The Mandalorian as a Zero-G indicator. The crew were awakened on the second day of the flight with Phil Collins's "In the Air Tonight".

Resilience docked to the International Docking Adapter (IDA) on the Harmony module on November 17, 2020, at 04:01 UTC. Over the course of the mission, the four astronauts lived and worked alongside the three astronauts of the Soyuz MS-17 mission. Together, the two missions form ISS Expedition 64. Assuming the regular ISS crew rotation schedule is adhered to, the crew transfer to Expedition 65 following the departure of Soyuz MS-17, on April 17, 2021.

On April 5, 2021, the Crew-1 astronauts relocated their spacecraft from Harmony forward to Harmony zenith by using the Draco thrusters that are mounted on the side of Dragon Resilience's trunk, to make way for the arrival and docking of the SpaceX Crew-2 spacecraft, launched on April 23, 2021.

In July 2022, it was reported that some of the debris from Crew 1 Dragon crashed into a farm in Australia.

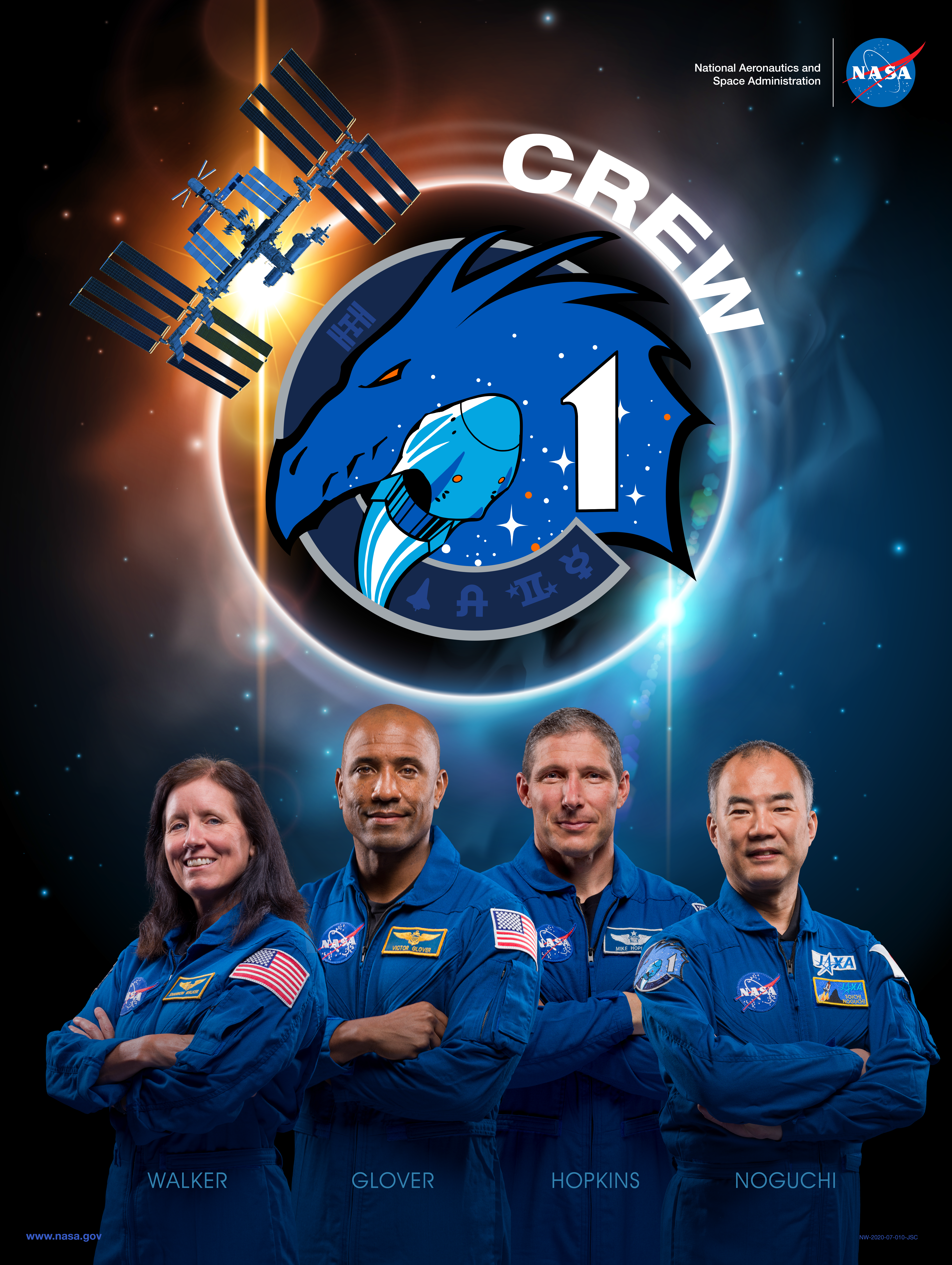
SpaceX Crew-1 Promotional poster

=== Timeline ===
MET	Time		Date (UTC)	Event
MET	EST	UTC	Date (UTC)	Event
−7:40:00	11:47:15 AM	16:47:15	November 15 2020	Crew wake
−05:30:00	1:57:15 PM	18:57:15	November 15 2020	CE (signification?) launch readiness briefing
−05:00:00	2:27:15 PM	19:27:15	November 15 2020	Launch shift on console
−04:59:59	2:27:16 PM	19:27:16	November 15 2020	Dragon IMU align and configure for launch.
−04:30:00	2:57:15 PM	19:57:15	November 15 2020	Dragon propellant pressurization
−04:15:00	3:12:15 PM	20:12:15	November 15 2020	Crew weather brief
−04:05:00	3:22:15 PM	20:22:15	November 15 2020	Crew handoff
−04:00:00	3:27:15 PM	20:27:15	November 15 2020	Suit donning and checkouts
−03:22:00	4:05:15 PM	21:05:15	November 15 2020	Crew walk out of Neil Armstrong Operations and Checkout Building
−03:15:00	4:12:15 PM	21:12:15	November 15 2020	Crew transportation to Launch Complex 39A (LC-39A)
−02:55:00	4:32:15 PM	21:32:15	November 15 2020	Crew arrives at pad.
−02:35:00	4:52:15 PM	21:52:15	November 15 2020	Crew ingress
−02:20:00	5:07:15 PM	22:07:15	November 15 2020	Communication check
−02:15:00	5:12:15 PM	22:12:15	November 15 2020	Verify ready seat rotation
−02:14:00	5:13:15 PM	22:13:15	November 15 2020	Suit leak checks
−01:55:00	5:32:15 PM	22:32:15	November 15 2020	Hatch close
−01:10:00	6:17:15 PM	23:17:15	November 15 2020	ISS state upload to Dragon
−00:45:00	6:42:15 PM	23:42:15	November 15 2020	SpaceX launch director verifies go for propellant load
−00:42:00	6:45:15 PM	23:45:15	November 15 2020	Crew access arm retracts
−00:37:00	6:49:15 PM	23:49:15	November 15 2020	Dragon launch escape system is armed.
−00:35:00	6:52:15 PM	23:52:15	November 15 2020	RP-1 (rocket grade kerosene) loading begins; 1st stage LOX (liquid oxygen) loading begins.
−00:16:00	7:11:15 PM	00:11:15	November 16 2020	2nd stage LOX loading begins.
−00:07:00	7:20:15 PM	00:20:15	November 16 2020	Falcon 9 begins engine chill prior to launch.
−00:05:00	7:22:15 PM	00:22:15	November 16 2020	Dragon transitions to internal power
−00:01:00	7:26:15 PM	00:26:15	November 16 2020	Command flight computer to begin final prelaunch checks; propellant tank pressurization to flight pressure begins.
−00:00:45	7:26:30 PM	00:26:30	November 16 2020	SpaceX launch director verifies go for launch.
−00:00:03	7:27:12 PM	00:27:12	November 16 2020	Engine controller commands engine ignition sequence to start.
+00:00:00	7:27:17 PM	00:27:17	November 16 2020	Lift Off
+00:00:58	7:28:15 PM	00:28:15	November 16 2020	Max Q (moment of peak mechanical stress on the rocket)
+00:02:37	7:29:54 PM	00:29:54	November 16 2020	1st stage main engine cutoff (MECO)
+00:02:40	7:29:57 PM	00:29:57	November 16 2020	1st and 2nd stages separate
+00:02:48	7:30:05 PM	00:30:05	November 16 2020	2nd stage engine starts
+00:07:29	7:34:46 PM	00:34:46	November 16 2020	1st stage entry burn
+00:08:50	7:36:07 PM	00:36:07	November 16 2020	2nd stage engine cutoff (SECO-1)
+00:08:59	7:36:16 PM	00:36:16	November 16 2020	1st stage landing burn
+00:09:29	7:36:46 PM	00:36:46	November 16 2020	1st stage landing
+00:12:03	7:39:20 PM	00:39:20	November 16 2020	Crew Dragon separates from 2nd stage
+00:12:48	7:40:05 PM	00:40:05	November 16 2020	Dragon nosecone open sequence begins
+1/	9:22 PM	02:22	November 17 2020	Dragon starts the final phase of the approach to the ISS.
+1/03:33	11:01 PM	04:01	November 17 2020	Soft Capture to the ISS.
+1/03:33	11:01 PM	04:01	November 17 2020	Dragon docked to the ISS.
+1/05:34	1:02 AM	6:02	November 17 2020	Hatch opened.
+167	8:35 PM	01:35	May 1 2021	Undocked from the ISS.
+167	2:56 AM	7:56	May 2 2021	Splashed down and recovery in the Gulf of Mexico.

== Gallery ==
SpaceX Crew-1
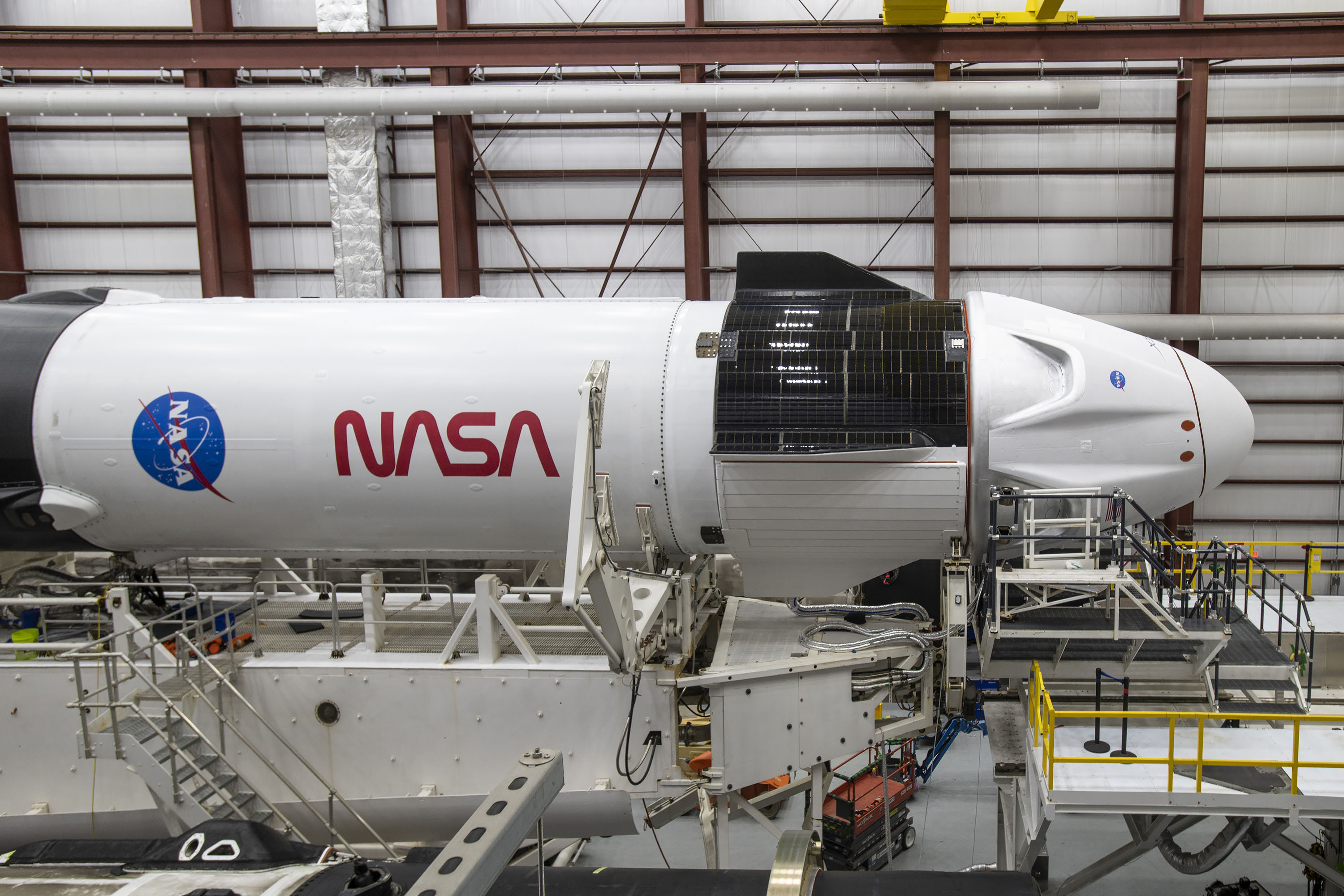
Resilience mated to Falcon 9 for Crew-1

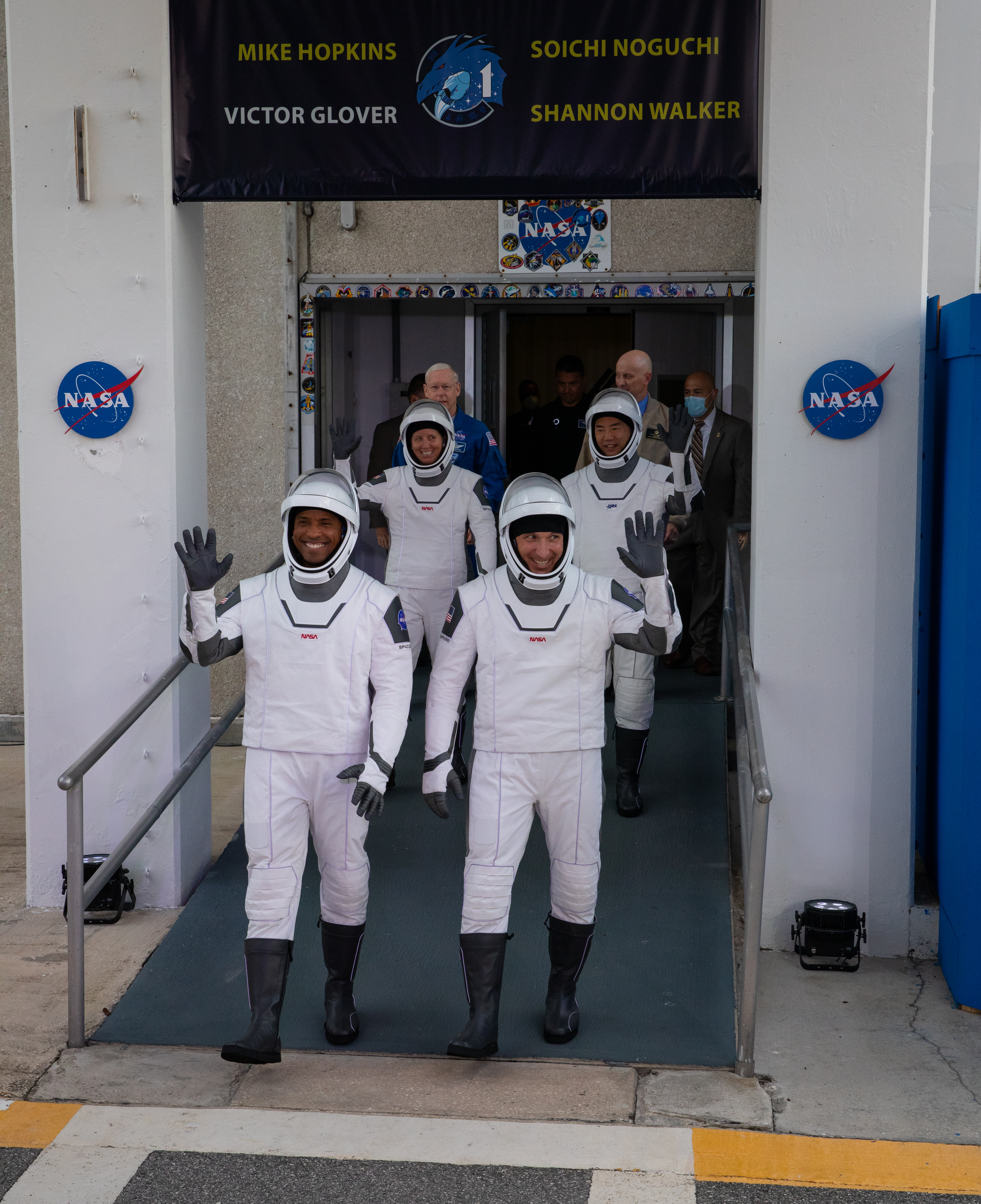
Crew-1 walkout

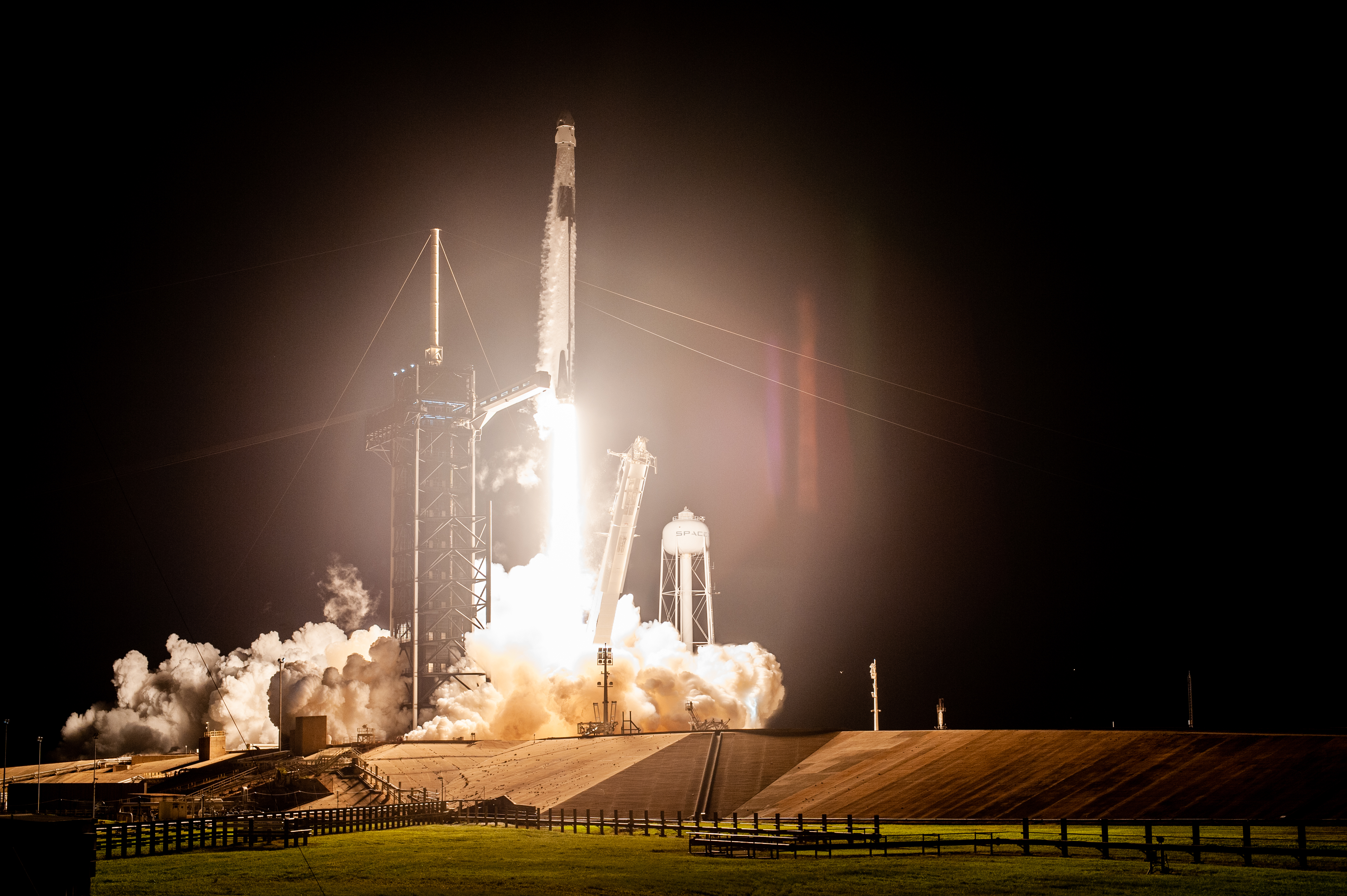
Launch of Crew-1

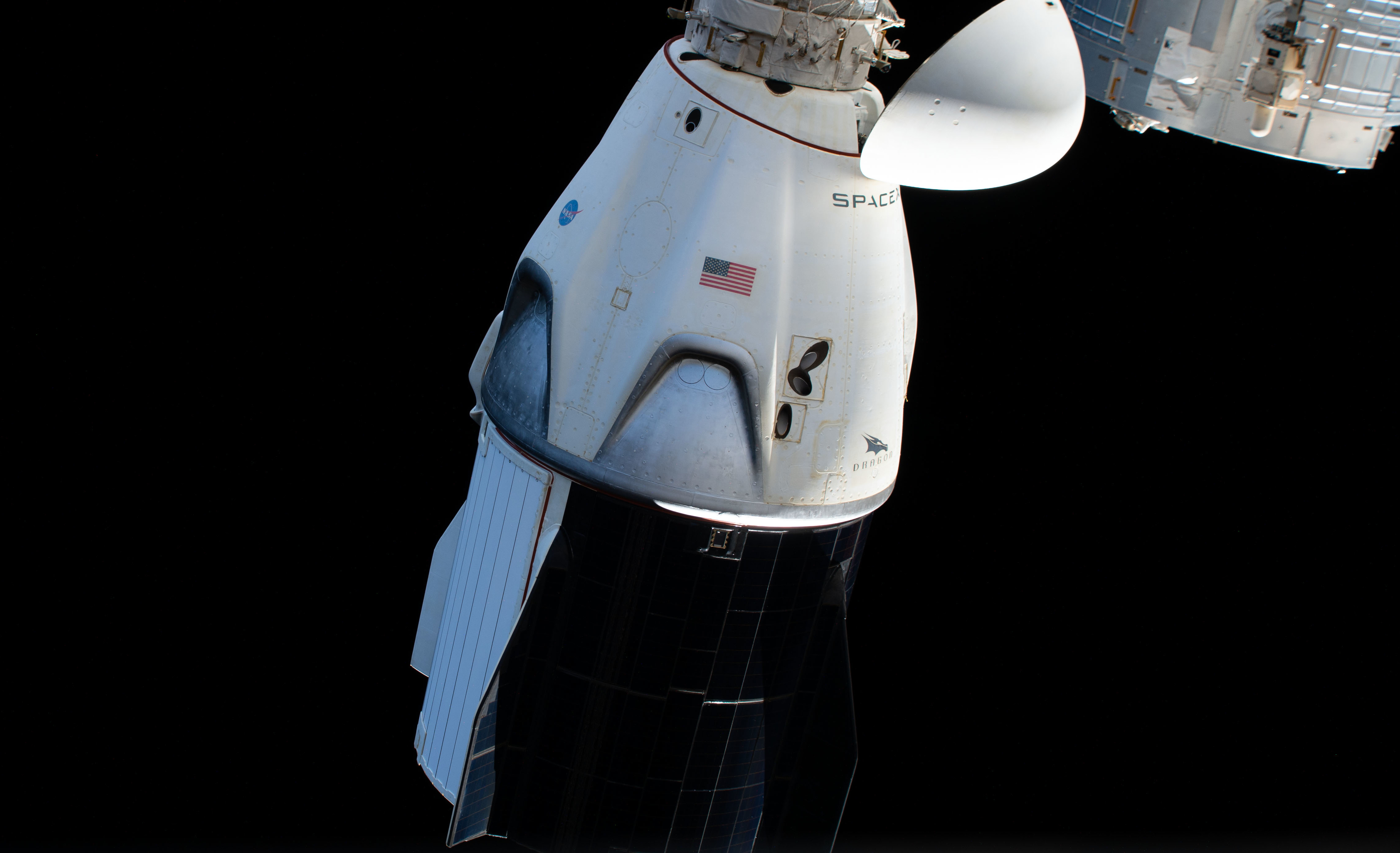
Resilience docked to the ISS

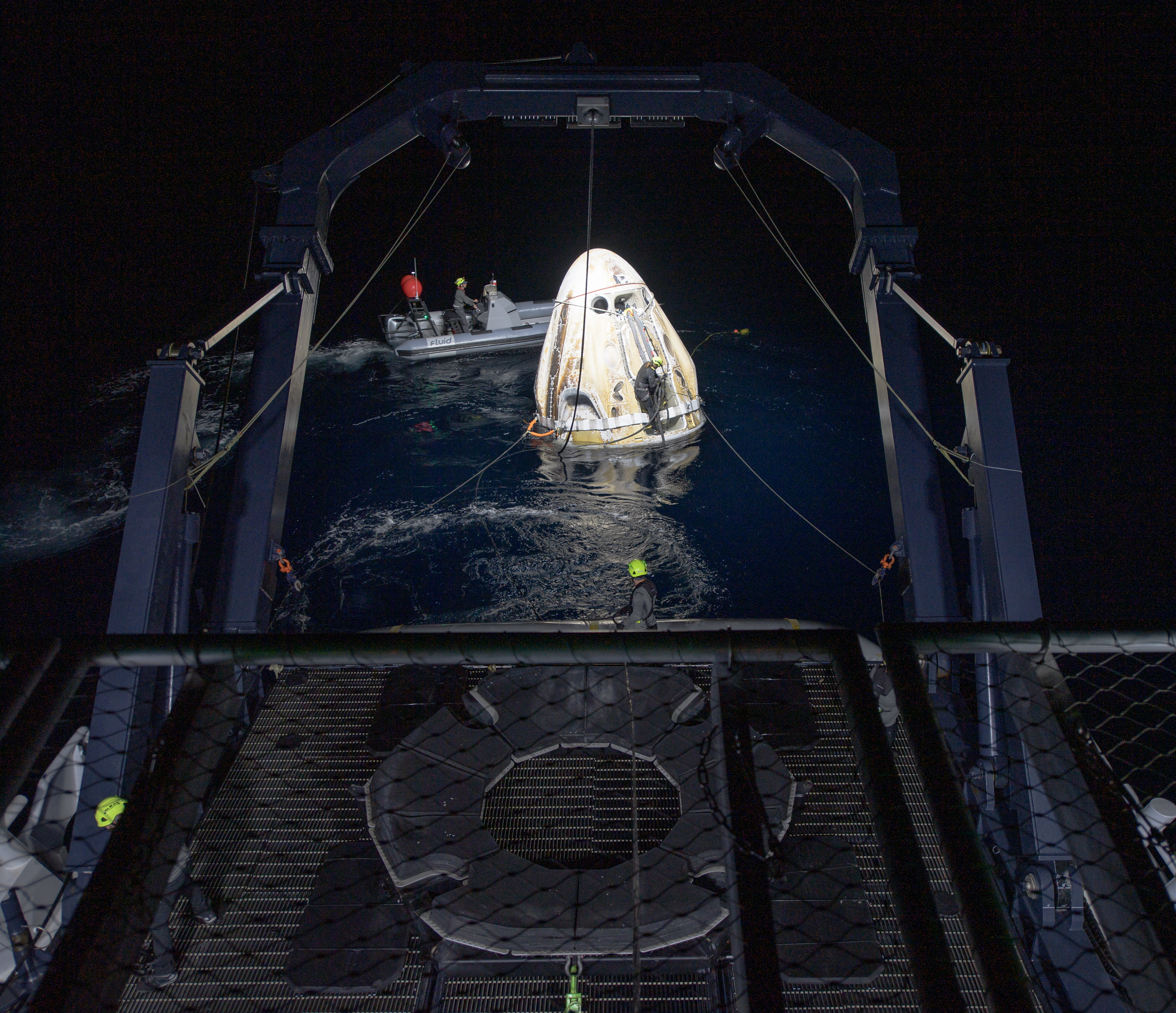
Recovery of Crew-1

== See also ==
- Boeing Starliner
- Crew Dragon Demo-2
- SpaceX Dragon 2
