= The Colony (American TV series) season 1 =

Coordinates: 34.040461°N 118.2242°W

The Colony
- Season 1
- No. of episodes: 10

Release
- Original network: Discovery Channel
- Original release: July 21 – September 22, 2009

Season chronology
- Next → Season 2

The Colony is a reality television program. The first season was filmed in an industrial area bordering the Los Angeles River on the edge of downtown Los Angeles, and follows ten cast members in an environment that simulates life after a global catastrophe. The series first aired on the Discovery Channel on July 21, 2009. Filming began on February 28, and ran until April 28, 2009.

== Cast ==
Allison White, "The Nurse," is a 29-year-old registered trauma nurse from Oklahoma City, whose natural inclinations allow her to remain calm in extreme, life-threatening situations; thus, she has found herself most at home working in the emergency room. She generally assisted others in projects until George was removed from the show, and then she took on a larger role as medical caregiver.

Amy West, "The Marine Scientist," is a 34-year-old marine biologist. Amy is certified in providing CPR and other medical assistance. She is believed to have been interested in marine biology while she was a child vacationing in the Caribbean. She and Allison kept tabs on the food supply and how they related to the colonists' health. She also participated in the manual labor.

George Fallieras, "The Doctor," is a 34-year-old ER doctor from Tampa, Florida. After majoring in Marine Biology at University of Florida and considering a career as a marine mammal veterinarian, he decided to go to medical school because he liked to take care of people even more than animals. He is a strong fisherman, can start a fire and hunt. George returned to New Orleans in the immediate aftermath of Hurricane Katrina to provide care in makeshift medical units. In Episode 6, he was removed from the show as part of the experiment.

Joey Sciacca, "The Independent Contractor," is a 37-year-old contractor hailing from Los Angeles, California. He is a Black Belt in Tang Soo Do. He also is proficient in plumbing, electrical maintenance, drywall refurbishing, framing and framework, concrete construction, and is also seen to be an artist. Joey has admitted to being incarcerated for six consecutive years for trafficking but stated that he is now a changed man. Joey now works in construction, where he utilizes his skills as an eco-friendly contractor.

John Maxwell Cohn, "The Computer Engineer," is a 49-year-old chief IBM scientist for design automation from Richmond, Vermont. He fixes, makes and hacks electronics, fabricates mechanical devices, and welds. His other talents include building structures out of natural materials, growing edible plants, sculpting and fire building. John is typically viewed as an eccentric personality. He has been referred to by the other colonists as 'The Professor'. Viewers have consistently rated him as the number one colonist.

John Valencia, "The Machinist," is a 37-year-old machinist from Covina, California, specializing in fitting for irrigation waterworks, repairing motor-vehicle engines, and rebuilding alternators to hook up to generators for electricity. He also has developed hand crank electrical systems. He is a purported conservationist.

Leilani Smith, "The Martial Arts Instructor," started her martial arts career at the age of 28. She now works as a personal self defense instructor in Tacoma, Washington. Smith played a role in defending the colony by designing a gym and instructing the other colonists in the practice of self-defense.

Michael "Mike" Raines, "The Handyman," is a 47-year-old actor and solar panel installer/designer originating from Kotor, Montenegro (formerly SFR Yugoslavia). He currently resides in Santa Monica, California. He specializes in building alternative energy sources and in designing for security. His temper and poor interpersonal skills put him at odds with the other colonists. The productivity lost to these difficulties highlights the importance of sociological and psychological aspects of group survival.

Morgan Hooker, "The Aerospace Engineer" is a 23-year-old aerospace engineer from Woodland Hills, California. She has a B.S. in mechanical aerospace engineering from The George Washington University. Morgan builds custom computers for both individuals and companies, designs irrigation canals, and builds heat-insulated shelters. She is also proficient in mechanical engineering.

Vladimir Beck, "The Mechanical Engineer," is a retired oil industry engineer who currently lives in Los Angeles, California. He has spent around 40 years working as an engineer in oil refineries. As a young man, he had been in the military and left SFR Yugoslavia.

Diane Cohn, John Cohn's wife, a 49-year-old electronics engineer, who is reunited with him in Episode 8. She remains with the group until the end.

=== Supporting cast ===
- Adam Montella – homeland security advisor
- Dr. Miatta Snetter – psychologist, psychotherapist / post-traumatic stress disorder specialist
- Dr. Tom Mackin – engineer / technology analyst

== Episode list ==
No.	Title	Original release date	Prod. code
1	"Arrival and Survival"	July 21, 2009	TBA
2	"Power Struggle"	July 28, 2009	TBA
3	"Comfort in Chaos"	August 4, 2009	TBA
4	"Safety and Security"	August 11, 2009	TBA
5	"A Stranger Among Us"	August 18, 2009	TBA
Two strangers walk into the compound with their own key and claim that it belongs to them.
6	"Loss and Communication"	August 25, 2009	TBA
7	"A Test of Faith"	September 1, 2009	TBA
8	"Recon Mission"	September 8, 2009	DTC108
9	"Breaking Point"	September 15, 2009	DTC109
10	"Exodus"	September 22, 2009	DTC110
The colonists receive a transmission with the coordinates of a larger safe haven with hundreds of survivors and food, but getting there will be difficult as they must defend the warehouse when Andre returns with a group of raiders for an assault on the colony.

== Phases and projects ==
=== Episode 1 ===
Phase	Context	Description
Phase 1: Sleep Deprivation	Shock and Fatigue	To simulate the stress survivors experience in the aftermath of a disaster, the volunteers were kept awake for thirty hours with almost no food or water.
Phase 2: Looting	Scarcity of Supplies	Mentally drained, the first six volunteers were given fifteen minutes in an abandoned department store to acquire as many resources as they can carry.
Phase 3: The Marauders	Resource Competition	Ten minutes into scavenging, a gang of looters and thugs are sent in to steal the volunteers' supplies.
Phase 4: River Walk	Search for Shelter	Before arriving at the colony, the volunteers haul their 200 pounds of looted supplies eight miles (13 km) down the Los Angeles River.
Phase 5: Arrival and Survival	Rebuilding Begins	The colonists arrive at an 80,000-square-foot (7,400 m^{2}) warehouse on a 3 1/2-acre plot of land. They are supplied with rudimentary materials, tools, and a small supply of food and water. How they use these resources is up to them.

Projects

- Water Filter: The Los Angeles River is the colonists' main water source, but the water is unsafe to drink without filtration. The plan is to puncture small holes in a 55-gallon drum, and fill it with multiple layers of sand and charcoal to filter out impurities such as algae, lead, and E. coli. The water is then to be boiled to remove bacteria, as only then will they have a safe water supply.
- Cooktop: To cook their food, the colonists suspend a steel plate over a fire inside a steel drum.
- Giant Bed: Using some cardboard, pallets, box-springs, fabric and foam, the colonists assemble a giant bed to sleep on.
- Night Watch: In this post-apocalyptic world, security can be compromised at any time, so at night one or two colonists stay up to look after the others at certain times through the night.
- Battery Array: To get electricity, the colonists daisy chain twenty 12-volt car batteries in parallel to maximise the current. They then convert the direct current to alternating current using an inverter. It provides just enough power to last just a week, so a generator will need to be built to recharge the batteries.
- Cistern: Keeping a supply of drinking water is crucial to the colonists' survival. To guarantee a steady supply, they move the filter on a warehouse shelf and place a large container beneath it.
- Rain Catching: When a rare LA storm approaches, Mike and John V. modify the gutters of the warehouse to catch and stockpile rainwater, thus saving them a river trip.
- Laundry: Because of the grime on the roof, the first part of the collected rainwater is too dirty to drink, but it is suitable for laundry. Without detergent, the colonists improvise using baking soda, and to clean their clothes they use a piece of corrugated steel as a washboard.

=== Episode 2 ===
Phase	Context	Description
Phase 6: Sustainable Energy	Fuel Shortage	With the battery array running out of power, the colonists need to build a generator and find a plentiful fuel source.
Phase 7: Foraging	Resource Acquisition	With a lack of food, the colonists go out to acquire more food for the colony. They acquire a small supply of canned goods, fresh fruit, and a pair of goats.

Projects

- Generator: The immediate priority is power, and with the batteries having only a few days worth of power left, a generator needs to be built. The plan is to scavenge an engine from a pressure washer, a pulley system from a ventilation fan, and a car alternator. The engine's drive shaft must turn the pulley and the pulley must spin the alternator. Just like in a car the alternator converts mechanical energy into electrical energy, which is needed to charge the battery array.
- Wood Gasifier: To keep the generator engine running they will need a constant fuel supply. One way is to scavenge for gasoline, but that method is dangerous and barely sustainable. John C. proposed building a gasifier after noticing an abundance of wood. A gasifier is two containers each holding wood scraps. The wood in the first container is used to build a fire. The fire heats the wood in the second container releasing a flammable vapor called wood gas. The wood gas is then piped directly into the generator engine.
- Escape Vehicle: Everyone agrees that the warehouse, or the city for that matter, is not an ideal place for long-term survival in this post-apocalyptic world. Noticing a broken-down flatbed truck out on the yard, everyone brings it inside the warehouse and into the main work area so it can later be used for their exodus.

=== Episode 3 ===
Phase	Context	Description
Phase 8: Creature Comforts	Recreating Home	With a power source for their tools, the colonists decide to make a shower and other smaller comforts to improve morale.
Phase 9: River Trip	Resource Scarcity	Running out of water and tired of eating canned goods, the colonists head to the river to acquire water, fresh fish, and citrus.
Phase 10: Power On	Outside Contact	Discovering the small television is on and is receiving an emergency signal, the colonists who did not leave the colony to go on the river trip discover that the power from the grid has been turned on for a short time.
Phase 11: Colony Attack	Resource Competition	Not paying attention to security, the colonists are surprised by an attack on the warehouse by marauders and thieves, and they lose two days worth of food afterwards. The marauders were given instructions not to physically harm the colonists, but the colonists don't know that and accidents can happen.

Projects

- Solar Shower: The immediate project is a shower. A tank of water on the roof uses solar energy to heat the water inside. The tank is painted black to maximize heat absorption, has reflectors aimed at it to increase heat absorption, and is shrink wrapped to preserve the heat. A garden hose hooked to it pours the water down into a wood and fiberglass structure. The gray water is then piped out of the box and into a bucket. Water is pulled up by a bicycle pulley to the roof.
- Fish Trap: Amy makes a fish net to help with fishing in the river.
- Visual Diary: Morgan starts a picture diary about the colony's day activities in the Hieroglyphic room.

=== Episode 4 ===
Phase	Context	Description
Phase 12: Security	Safety From Attack	After being surprised by an attack from marauders and thieves, the colonists agree to increase their security on the warehouse.
Phase 13: Traders	Negotiation Skills	A group of gun-toting traders arrive to trade with the colonists.

Projects

- Warehouse Fortification: The immediate project is securing the warehouse with better defenses. Joey fixes the hole in the back wall that was previously breached by putting trash on the stairs. He also puts chainlink on the wall where they were previously attacked to prevent any openings in the wall and puts wooden board secured with metal screws to keep the front door shut.
- Weapons: The colonists build a series of weapons for defending their home. John C. creates a flamethrower and a large taser that can be used from a few feet away. Vladimir starts building claymore mines out of some small materials.
- Gym: Leilani builds a small gym to teach everyone self-defense for when they need to leave the warehouse. She makes a punching bag by filling a nylon bag with dirt from the yard and suspending it with chains.
- Trading: The colonists send Joey and Mike to trade goods with the traders outside. They trade an air compressor and jackhammer for a ten-kilowatt generator and five gallons of gasoline. They also trade 157 oranges, eight cans of food, one bag of flour, and one bag of salt for two chickens, one jug of cooking oil, one box of toiletries, and nine yuccas.
- Escape Vehicle: Mike and John V. get to work on the two-ton truck to get it running again. The colonists wish to use to leave the city and move into the country for a more sustainable existence. Mike discovers that one of the engine's pistons and the carburetor's butterfly valve were rusted in place and that the engine won't start. Fortunately he manages to fix them, so now the engine runs.

=== Episode 5 ===
Phase	Context	Description
Phase 14: Solar Power	Fuel Shortage	Not having enough power for their fabrication needs, the team goes out scouting for renewable energy in the form of obtaining solar panels.
Phase 15: New Arrivals	Test of Unity	Two mysterious new colonists, Andre and Elizabeth, make their way into the complex through a locked side door, to test the team's willingness to accept outsiders and their unity against potential threats.

Projects

- Solar Panel Rig: Using the generator obtained from the traders in Episode 4, Mike, Joey and others set out to build a rig for the solar panels they obtained from the roof of a nearby building and along the railroad. John C. works to build a device that incorporates two photodiodes and a small motor into a solar tracking device, allowing the solar panels to follow the sun during the day, and return to starting positions at night.
- Washing Machine: To make the laundry duty easier, John V. modifies the interior of a steel drum, then sets it on an angled base mounted with wheels so no water can get out. To conserve electricity, he gets the drum turning by hooking it up to a bicycle so it runs on pedal power instead.
- Escape Vehicle: Their next objective for the escape vehicle is to get the bed stripped by removing the damaged truck bed and the remaining part of the trailer body, that way they can have something to work with.

=== Episode 6 ===
Phase	Context	Description
Phase 16: Health	Illness and Injury	Five weeks of living in unsanitary conditions proves to be a health hazard for the colonists so even minor cuts and bruises need to be continuously looked after. Also, a lower intake of food has taken its toll on them physically as well.
Phase 17: Hospital Foraging	Resource Scarcity	Needing medical supplies, as well as food and other salvageable materials, some of the colonists enter an abandoned hospital for resources.
Phase 18: Disappearance	Coping With Loss	To simulate a loss in the group, George is removed from the experiment during the hospital trip. None of the colonists are informed of his whereabouts or if he will return.
Phase 19: Communication	Outside Contact	While grieving the loss of George, power from the grid goes on again and the television receives an emergency broadcast for a short while. With renewed hope, the colonists focus on communication with the outside world.

Projects

- Clinic: Allison and George clean part of the lookout for a sanitary environment for a clinic. They assemble the furniture and shelving found in a typical doctors office and place a scale to check the colonists' weight. The colonists' conditions are recorded in a journal.
- Spark-Gap Transmitter: John C. proposes making a rudimentary transmitter that's similar to a telegraph. It will consist of four components made from scratch. First, a capacitor is made from aluminium foil and glass sandwiched together to store electrical energy. A switch will activate a spark gap which will release the stored energy. John C. crafts a transformer that consists of a spool-like housing made of PVC pipe and copper wire to turn the electrical energy into radio waves. Finally, an antenna will be wired to broadcast the radio waves over the AM band. Their messages will be transmitted in Morse Code.
- Receiver: To go with the spark-gap transmitter, Morgan proceeds to build a receiver to go with it so they can listen in on any responses. She installs a second antenna to the roof of the warehouse and wraps a piece of insulated copper coil around a discarded peanut butter jar. She then hooks the receiver up to a telephone headset and later to a television to listen for any form of radio communication. By moving an alligator clip across the wires, she can pick up different AM frequencies.
- SOS Banner: Hoping to get help from someone, Mike and Allison paint an SOS message with instructions to transmit over the AM band on a large piece of fabric and hang it on the roof.
- Fireworks: Vladimir builds fireworks to hopefully get other survivors attention at night. For a fuse he uses string, glue, and charcoal from the gasifier. He then cuts ABS pipe to be used as a launcher. The fireworks themselves consists of gunpowder scavenged from shotgun shells and other flammable materials inside cardboard tubes. To safely set them off from the roof, he builds a detonation system so he can fire them from a safe distance.
- Escape Vehicle: Joey continues work on the escape vehicle by getting to work on the truck's bed. He puts in benches, hidden compartments, and a tank to hold 75 gallons of drinking water.

=== Episode 7 ===
Phase	Context	Description
Phase 20: Missionaries	Exploration of Faith	A group of missionaries walking down the river introduce the subject of faith to the colonists who are gathering water from the river.
Phase 21: Nomads	Sharing Resources	Two wandering nomads beg the colonists to share their dwindling resources in order to test their unity and sense of charity.

Projects

- Ozonator: With their propane supply gone, the colonists must find an alternative method of sterilizing the filtered water. One way is to use the cooktop to boil water, but that method isn't efficient enough to purify the amount of water they use every day. John C. gets an idea to use ozone as a way to purify their water supply. The plan is to build a tesla coil to generate ozone, then using a pump scavenged from hospital equipment, pipe the ozone into a bucket of water to be purified. John C. completes the project with some help from Mike and the colonists are now able to sterilize their water.
- Phonograph: Morgan is sick of all the stress and noise of colony life, so she decides to fix an old phonograph that she found. She discovers that the cartridge is broken, but is eventually able to fix it. The colonists celebrate by dancing.
- Soap: After it is discovered there is a soap shortage, John C. and Allison check on the soap they made two weeks previously. They created the soap from lard, lye, water, lavender and lemon. As it has now set they test it and discover that it works.
- Film Projector: John C. decides to fix an old film projector. The projector is missing the lamp so John C. uses the halogen lamp from a car headlight. He gets the projector running and the colonists spend the end of the day by watching some home movies that John Cohn found.
- Escape Vehicle: Mike and Joey use body panels from cars to armor the truck and protect it from projectiles.

=== Episode 8 ===
Phase	Context	Description
Phase 22: Reconnaissance	Preparing for Departure	The colonists continue their preparations for departure by developing plans for reconnaissance.
Phase 23: Nomads	Reunion and Self-Preservation	A group of nomads arrives at the colony asking for food and water. Among them are women with children, a handicapped individual, and the wife of John Cohn, Diane.
Phase 24: Waterworks	Return of Public Utilities	As part of the experiment the water has been turned on to simulate the spastic nature of public utilities after a disaster, but the warehouse pipes can't take the pressure. Just as suddenly as it came on, the water is turned off.
Phase 25: Recon Mission	Supplies and Information	Mike and Vlad leave the safety of the warehouse to scavenge for supplies and information. When they reach a trailer park they are met with other survivors who are living in their own colony. Unfortunately for Vlad and Mike, these colonists see them as thieves trying to steal their food.

Projects

- Electric Vehicle: Mike, John V. and John C. build a solar-powered trike using a 120-volt electric motor, car batteries and two solar panels.
- Surveillance Dirigible: Morgan and Allison build a surveillance dirigible, the plan is to inflate trash bags with helium, and place them inside a net. Suspended from the net is a styrofoam gondola to which a surveillance camera is mounted and computer fans for steering are attached. The dirigible is anchored to the ground using wires and a television so the colonists can observe from the ground.

=== Episode 9 ===
Phase	Context	Description
Phase 26: Transportation	Preparing for Disaster	When a group of marauders block access to their water source and Andre and Liz return to steal their resources, the colonists focus all their efforts on their departure plan.

Projects

- Scout Vehicle: Mike gets to work on a Ford Ranchero in hopes of making it into a third vehicle to be used for their escape.
- Trading: The traders return looking to haggle for items of interest that the colonists need. The colonists trade two solar panels, two tires, a bag of salt, a box of baking soda, and a kiss from Allison for ten gallons of propane, five gallons of gasoline, twenty gallons of water, one pound of beans and a jar of peanut butter.
- Escape Vehicle: With a low gasoline supply the flatbed truck won't go very far, so Vlad, John C. and Diane build a bigger version of the gasifier.

=== Episode 10 ===
Phase	Context	Description
Phase 27: Exodus	New Resources	In the aftermath of Mike's accident, the colonists put all of their effort into the truck.
Phase 28: Destination	Outside Contact	After transmitting their daily radio broadcast, the colonists receive a message from Umberto giving information about a safe destination.
Phase 29: The Final Attack	Fight for Survival	Andre and the marauders arrive at the warehouse instructed to take control.

Projects

- Escape Vehicle: Vlad completes the cooling system for the trucks gasifier by using a radiator and a fan scavenged from an old car. At the same time Mike and John V. create a motorized solar panel array to place on the truck to provide electricity.
- Warehouse Defenses: Joey organizes security for the warehouse. John C's flamethrower has its range increased and mounted, and Amy makes a set of Molotov cocktails to be thrown from the roof. The warehouse doors are barricaded, and an electric fence and an oil trap are installed. All this is intended to buy the colonists time during an attack so they can escape.
