= Christopher Sembroski =

American data engineer, Air Force veteran, and space tourist

Chris Sembroski
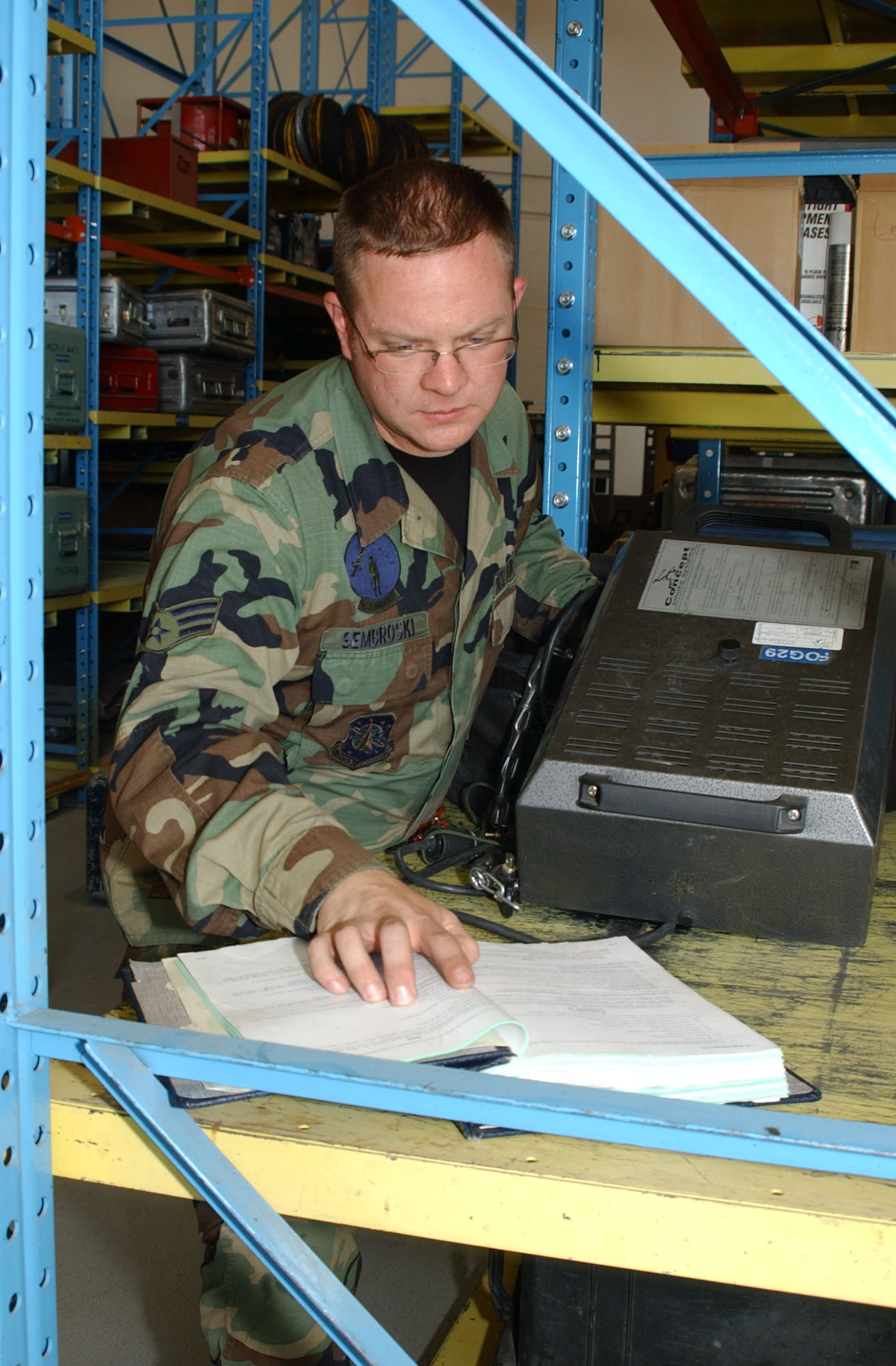
- Chris Sembroski (June 2007)
- Born: Christopher Sembroski; August 28, 1979 (age 47)
- Occupations: Data engineer (current); US Air Force missileman (former)
- Known for: Private astronaut aboard Inspiration4
- Space career

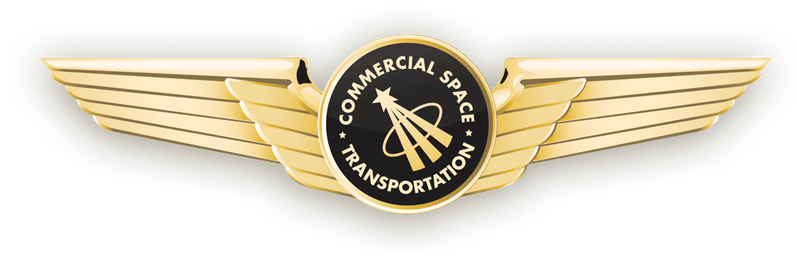
Commercial astronaut
- Time in space: 2d 23h 3m
- Missions: Inspiration4

Christopher Sembroski (born August 28, 1979) is an American data engineer, Air Force veteran, and commercial astronaut. He flew to orbit on Inspiration4, a private spaceflight funded by billionaire Jared Isaacman.

Sembroski is an ex Blue Origin employee and was a crew member on the Inspiration4 mission. The spaceflight position was given to Sembroski by his friend Kyle Hippchen, as he was unable to accept the prize because he exceeded the weight limit of the Dragon vehicle.

Sembroski has long had an interest in space, being an amateur astronomer and rocketeer. Sembroski received the call sign "Hanks" during training.

He is featured on the cover of a Time magazine double issue with the rest of the crew of Inspiration4 in August 2021.

== Career ==
Sembroski grew up in Kannapolis, North Carolina. During college, Sembroski volunteered for ProSpace, a nonprofit organization advocating for private spaceflight. Sembroski also was a counselor at Space Camp in Huntsville, Alabama which promotes science, technology, engineering, and math to children and teenagers. After college, Sembroski joined the United States Air Force as an Electro-Mechanical Technician stationed at Malmstrom Air Force Base in Great Falls, MT. In 2021, Sembroski started work as a data engineer for Lockheed Martin, and subsequently moved to work as an avionics engineer at Blue Origin. He currently works for Starfish Space.

He is a member of the Association of Space Explorers. In 2026 he was selected as a global space fellow for the Karman Project.
