= Hayley Arceneaux =

American physician assistant and astronaut

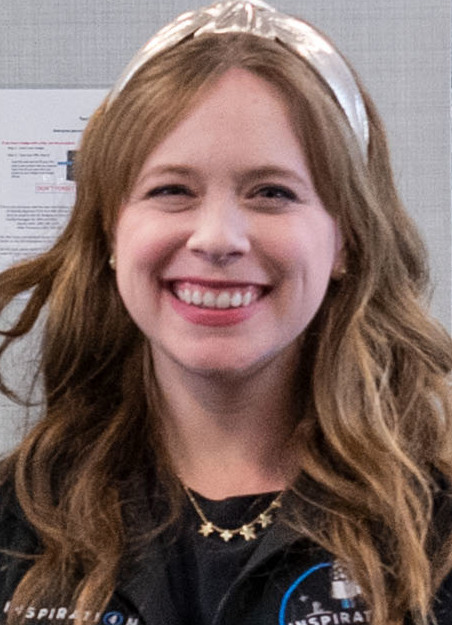
- Arceneaux at Johnson Space Center in 2022
- Born: December 4, 1991 (age 34); Baton Rouge, Louisiana
- Education: Southeastern Louisiana University
- Occupation: Physician assistant
- Known for: Private astronaut aboard Inspiration4
- Relatives
- Space career

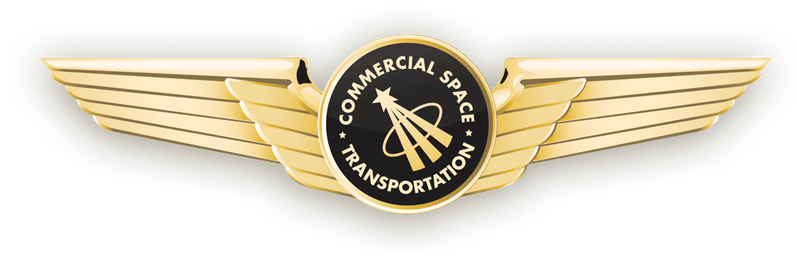
Commercial astronaut
- Time in space: 2d 23h 3m
- Missions: Inspiration4

Hayley Arceneaux (born December 4, 1991) is an American physician assistant and commercial astronaut. She joined billionaire Jared Isaacman on SpaceX's first private spaceflight Inspiration4, which launched on September 16, 2021, 00:02:56 UTC, and successfully water-landed local-time on Saturday, September 18. Arceneaux became the first human in space with a prosthetic leg bone after surviving bone cancer. At age 29, Arceneaux was the youngest American to travel to space, surpassed a few months later by 23-year-old Cameron Bess aboard Blue Origin NS-19. As Bess' flight was suborbital, Arceneaux remained the youngest American to have orbited Earth.

== Early life and education ==
Arceneaux was raised in St. Francisville, Louisiana. Her father, Howard Stanford Arceneaux, died July 5, 2018, at the age of 60 years old. Her brother and sister-in-law are aerospace engineers.

When she was 10 years old, her left knee began to ache. Her doctor thought it was just a sprain, but a few months later, tests revealed she had osteosarcoma, a type of bone cancer. Her family turned to St. Jude Children's Research Hospital for her treatment and care, which included around a dozen rounds of chemotherapy, a limb-preservation surgery with knee replacement and placement of a titanium rod in her left thigh bone along with associated physical therapy. The experience inspired her to want to work with other cancer patients at St. Jude, which she does as a physician assistant working with leukemia and lymphoma patients.

Arceneaux graduated from St. Joseph's Academy in Baton Rouge, Louisiana, and obtained an undergraduate degree in Spanish in 2014. She obtained her Physician Assistant (PA) degree in 2016 from LSU Health in Shreveport, Louisiana.

== Personal endeavors ==
=== Inspiration4 spaceflight ===
Arceneaux was described as the chief medical officer onboard Inspiration4, a private spaceflight funded by billionaire Jared Isaacman. She has said she thinks she will be the first Cajun in space. She is the first person to launch with a prosthesis. As part of the training, she climbed Mount Rainier in Washington with the rest of the Inspiration4 crew.

Arceneaux received the call sign "Nova" during training.

Arceneaux is featured on the cover of a Time magazine double issue with the crew of Inspiration4 in August 2021.

She is a member of the Association of Space Explorers.

== Awards ==
- 2003 Louisiana Young Heroes

== Bibliography ==
- Wild Ride: A Memoir of I.V. Drips and Rocket Ships - by Hayley Arceneaux - 2022 - ISBN 0-59-344384-5
- Astronaut Hayley's Brave Adventure - by Hayley Arceneaux - 2025 - ISBN 0-59-344390-X
