= Association of Space Explorers =

Non-governmental space organization

- Formation: 1984-09-08
- Founded at: Abbey de Cernay, France
- Type: Professional association
- Members: 366 (2026-06-09)
- President: Julie Payette
- Website: https://www.space-explorers.org

The Association of Space Explorers is a professional organization with a membership composed of people who have completed at least one Earth orbit in space (above 100 km (62 mi), as defined by the Fédération Aéronautique Internationale. It was founded in 1985, and had over 300 members from 38 countries as of 2026. The organization provides a forum for the promotion of space exploration, as well as space science and engineering and environmental awareness.

Inspired by his friendship with author Michael Murphy and involvement in the Esalen Institute's Soviet-American Exchange Program, NASA astronaut Rusty Schweickart established the Association along with cosmonauts Alexei Leonov, Vitaly Sevastyanov, and Georgi Grechko. The first Polish cosmonaut Mirosław Hermaszewski was one of the ASE's founding members.. A list of all founding members can be accessed in this official web page.

== Universal Astronaut Insignia and the Registry of Space Travelers ==
In 2021, the Association of Space Explorers announced the creation of the Universal Astronaut Insignia. The pin is offered to space travelers in orbital and suborbital variants, so that all space travelers are eligible to wear it. "Andy [Turnage] and I noted that even though many nations have flown citizens in space, only NASA astronauts have a specially-designed insignia for that relatively small community. We wondered if the time had come to create a common insignia for all space travelers, from all nations — and indeed it has," said Michael Lopez-Alegria.

Simultaneously, the association also created a Registry of Space Travelers that assigns a flight order number for each recipient of the Universal Astronaut Insignia, thus establishing a master record for spaceflight history.

== Planetary Congress ==
The Planetary Congress of the Association of Space Explorers is an annual forum for ASE members. It is held in a different host country every year.

- 36th Congress: São Paulo, Brazil (2025)
- 35th Congress: Noordwijk/Amsterdam, the Netherlands (2024)
- 34th Congress: Bursa, Turkey (2023)
- 33rd Congress: Budapest, Hungary (2021)
- 32nd Congress: Houston, Texas, USA (2019)
- 31st Congress: Minsk, Belarus (2018)
- 30th Congress: Toulouse, France (2017)
- 29th Congress: Vienna, Austria (2016)
- 28th Congress: Stockholm, Sweden (2015)
- 27th Congress: Beijing, China (2014)
- 26th Congress: Cologne, Germany (2013)
- 25th Congress: Riyadh, Saudi Arabia (2012)
- 24th Congress: Moscow, Russia (2011)
- 23rd Congress: Kuala Lumpur, Malaysia (2010)
- 22nd Congress: Prague, Czech Republic (2009)
- 21st Congress: Seattle, Washington, USA (2008)
- 20th Congress: Edinburgh, Scotland (2007)
- 19th Congress: Salt Lake City, Utah, USA (2005)
- 18th Congress: Tokyo, Japan (2003)
- 17th Congress: Almaty, Kazakhstan (2001)
- 16th Congress: Madrid, Spain (2000)
- 15th Congress: Bucharest, Romania (1999)
- 14th Congress: Brussels, Belgium (1998)
- 13th Congress: San Jose, Costa Rica (1997)
- 12th Congress: Montreal, Canada (1996)
- 11th Congress: Warsaw, Poland (1995)
- 10th Congress: Moscow/Lake Baikal, Russia (1994)
- 9th Congress: Vienna, Austria (1993)
- 8th Congress: Washington, DC, USA (1992)
- 7th Congress: Berlin, Germany (1991)
- 6th Congress: Groningen, The Netherlands (1990)
- 5th Congress: Riyadh, Saudi Arabia (1989)
- 4th Congress: Sofia, Bulgaria (1988)
- 3rd Congress: Mexico City, Mexico (1987)
- 2nd Congress: Budapest, Hungary (1986)
- 1st Congress: Cernay, France (1985)
