= Kikin =

Kikin may refer to:

- Kikin Hall, the residence of Alexander Kikin
- Kikin, Iran, a village in Kurdistan Province, Iran
- Kikin Hall, one of the oldest buildings in Saint Petersburg, Russia
- Kikin (surname)
