= Kikin (surname) =

Kikin (Russian: Кикин) is a Russian masculine surname, its feminine counterpart is Kikina. It may refer to

- Alexander Kikin (c.1670–1718), advisor to Alexei Petrovich, Tsarevich of Russia
- Anatoli Kikin (1940–2012), Russian football player and manager
- Anna Kikina (born 1984), Russian engineer and test cosmonaut
- Pyotr Kikin (1775–1834), Russian general and politician
