= Anna Kikina =

Russian engineer and cosmonaut (born 1984)

- Анна Кикина
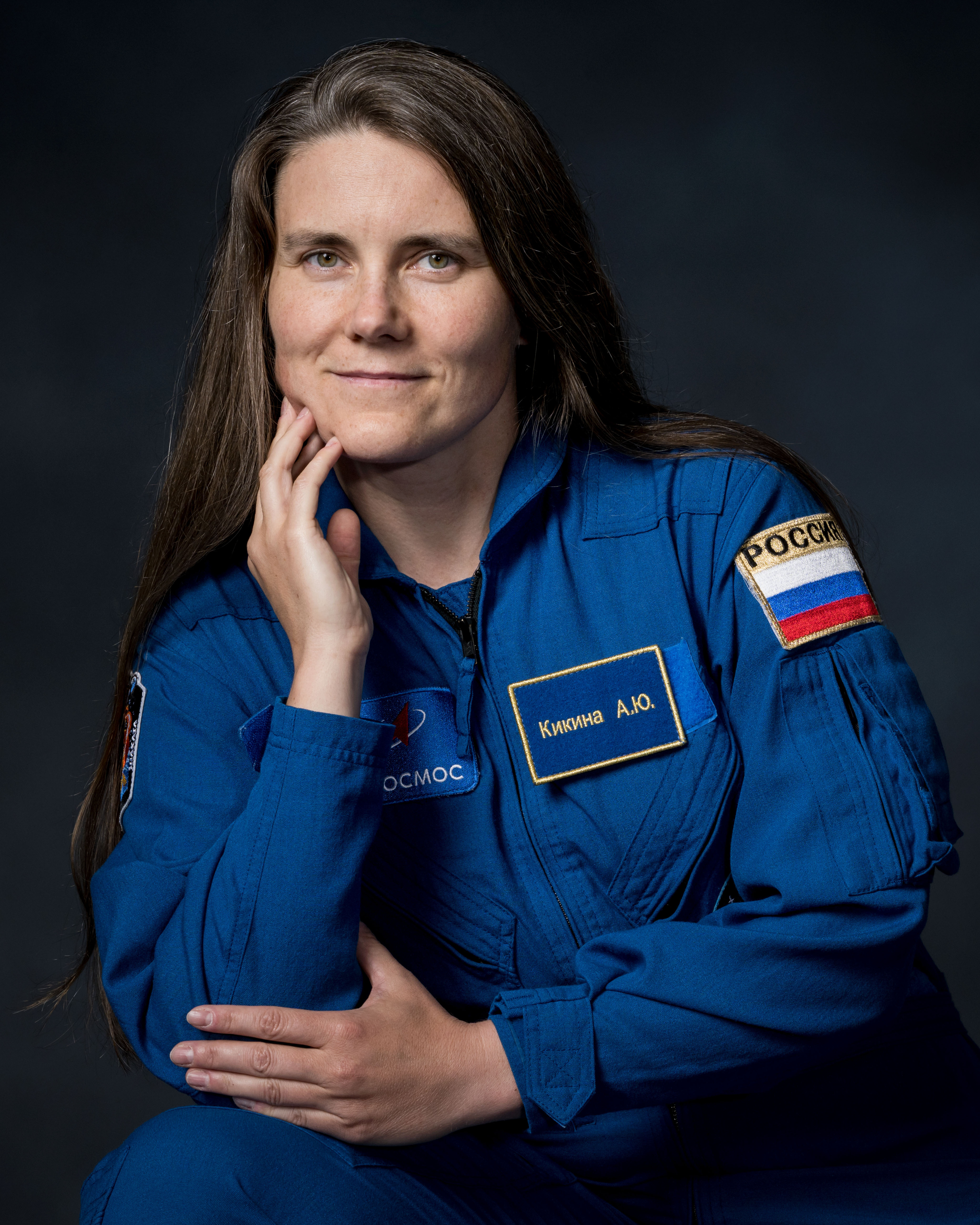
- Kikina in 2025
- Born: 27 August 1984 (age 42); Novosibirsk, Russian SFSR, Soviet Union
- Education: Siberian State University of Water Transport
- Spouse: Alexander Serdyuk
- Awards: Hero of the Russian Federation; Pilot-Cosmonaut of the Russian Federation
- Space career

Roscosmos cosmonaut
- Current occupation: Test cosmonaut
- Previous occupation: Program director, Radio-Siberia Altai
- Status: Active
- Time in space: 283 days, 4 hours, 43 minutes (currently in space)
- Selection: TsPK 2012 Cosmonaut Group
- Missions: SpaceX Crew-5 (Expedition 68); Soyuz MS-29 (Expedition 74/75)
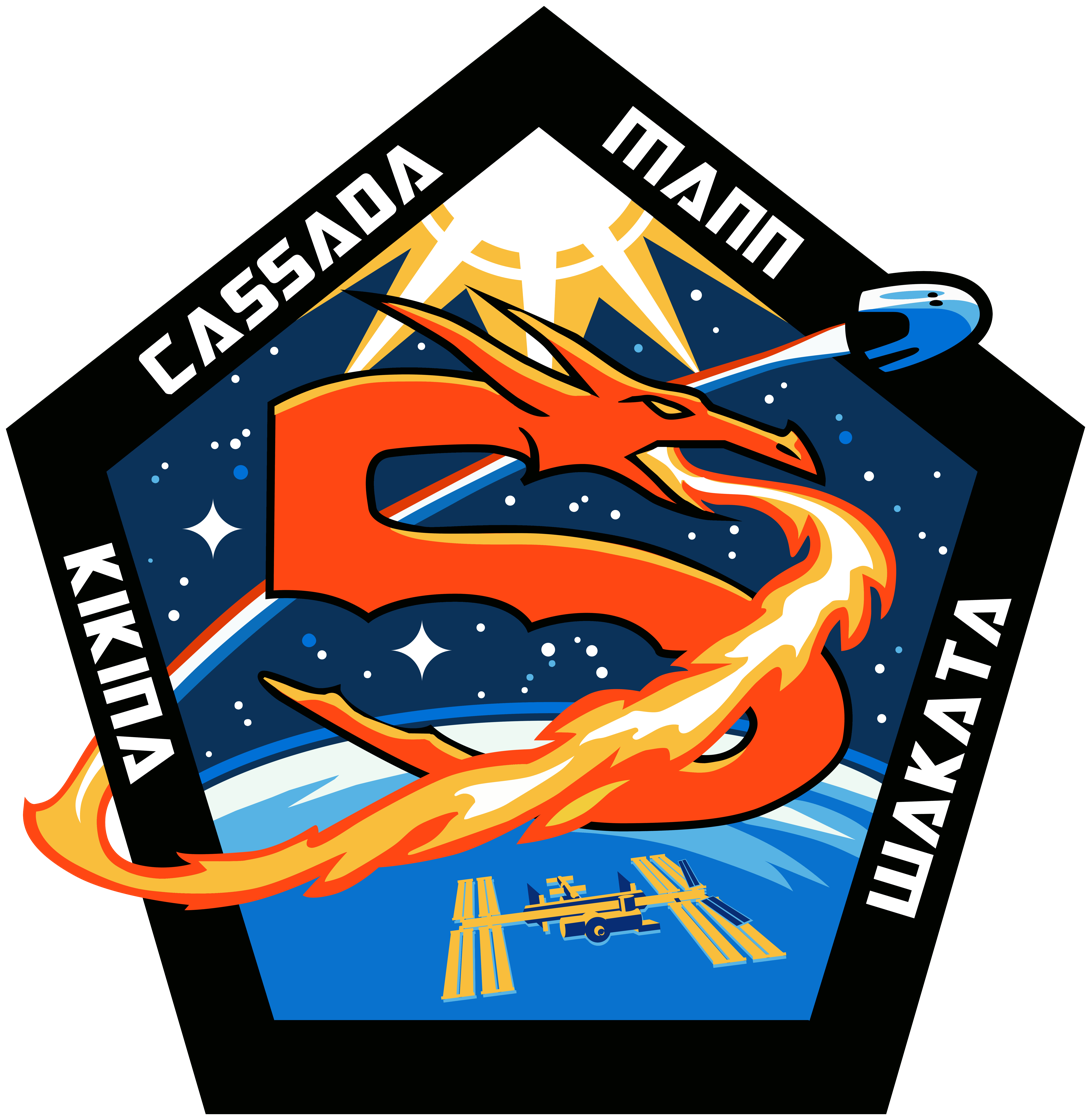
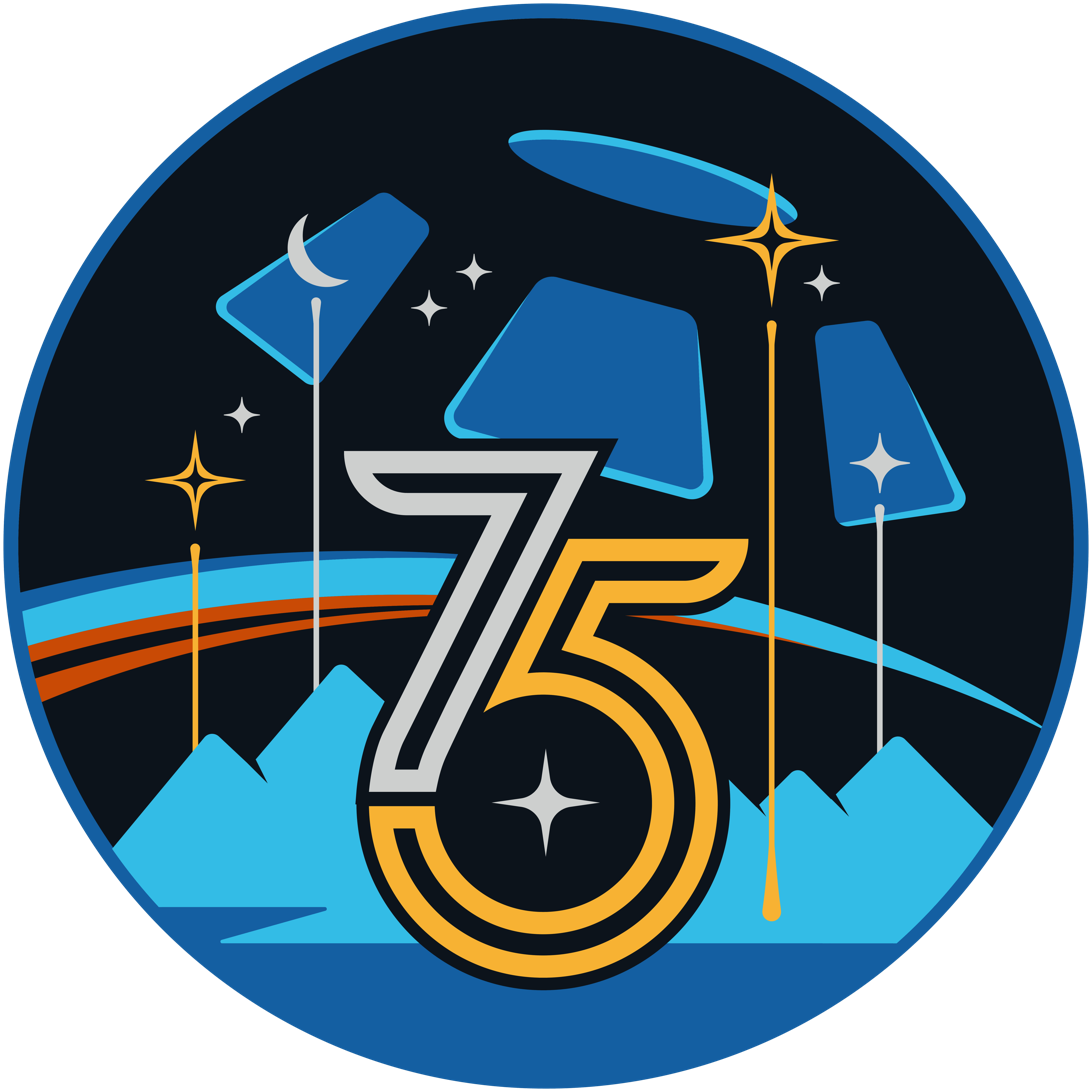
- Mission insignia

Anna Yuryevna Kikina (Russian: Анна Юрьевна Кикина; born 27 August 1984) is a Russian engineer and cosmonaut, selected in 2012. She is the only female cosmonaut currently in active service at Roscosmos. She made her first flight to space in 2022 to the International Space Station (ISS) aboard SpaceX Crew-5, the first Roscosmos cosmonaut to fly aboard a U.S. spacecraft since 2002. During her time on the ISS, Kikina served as a flight engineer during the long-duration Expedition 68 mission.

== Spaceflights ==
=== NASA SpaceX Crew-5 ===
In December 2021, Roscosmos Director General Dmitry Rogozin announced she would fly on an "American commercial spacecraft" in September 2022, while a NASA astronaut would take her seat on Soyuz making her the first Russian cosmonaut to fly a Crew Dragon and the first Roscosmos cosmonaut to fly aboard a U.S. spacecraft since 2002. In October 2022, the commercial flight launched as the SpaceX Crew-5 Crew Dragon.

On 11 March 2023, the SpaceX Crew-5 returned to Earth after 157 days. The flight lasted about 19 hours, and their capsule landed in the Gulf of Mexico.

=== Soyuz MS-29 ===
On July 1 2025, she was confirmed as a flight engineer on the Soyuz MS-29 flight, as well as a flight engineer for ISS Expeditions 74/75. She launched on July 14 2026 with her crewmates, Soyuz commander Pyotr Dubrov, and American flight engineer Anil Menon. They docked roughly 3 hours later with the Prichal nadir port on the ISS. She and the crew are scheduled to return to Earth in April 2027.

== Education ==
In 2006, Kikina graduated with honors from the Novosibirsk State Academy of Water Transportation Engineering.

In 2008, Kikina also earned a degree in economics and management.

== Personal life ==
Kikina was born in Novosibirsk. She worked as a tour guide in Altai region, as well as a swimming and paratrooper instructor. She also worked as radio host for Radio Siberia.

In spring 2021, toy manufacturer Mattel released a Barbie astronaut doll in Kikina's image.

Kikina is married to Alexander Serdyuk, a physical training instructor at the Cosmonaut Training Center.

== Awards ==
Kikina was awarded the titles of Hero of the Russian Federation and Pilot-Cosmonaut of the Russian Federation by decree of the President of Russia No. 233 on 3 April 2024.

Hero of the Russian Federation (3 April 2024) — for courage and heroism demonstrated during a long-duration spaceflight aboard the International Space Station.

Pilot-Cosmonaut of the Russian Federation.

Yuri A. Gagarin Medal (Roscosmos, 2023).

Medal “For the Promotion of Rescue Work” (EMERCOM of Russia, 2023).

Medal commemorating the 110th anniversary of the birth of Alexander Ivanovich Pokryshkin (Novosibirsk, 2023).

Title of “Honorary Resident of the City of Novosibirsk” (May 2023).

== See also ==
- List of female Heroes of the Russian Federation
- List of female astronauts
- Women in space
