= Soyuz MS-29 =

2026 Russian crewed spaceflight to the ISS

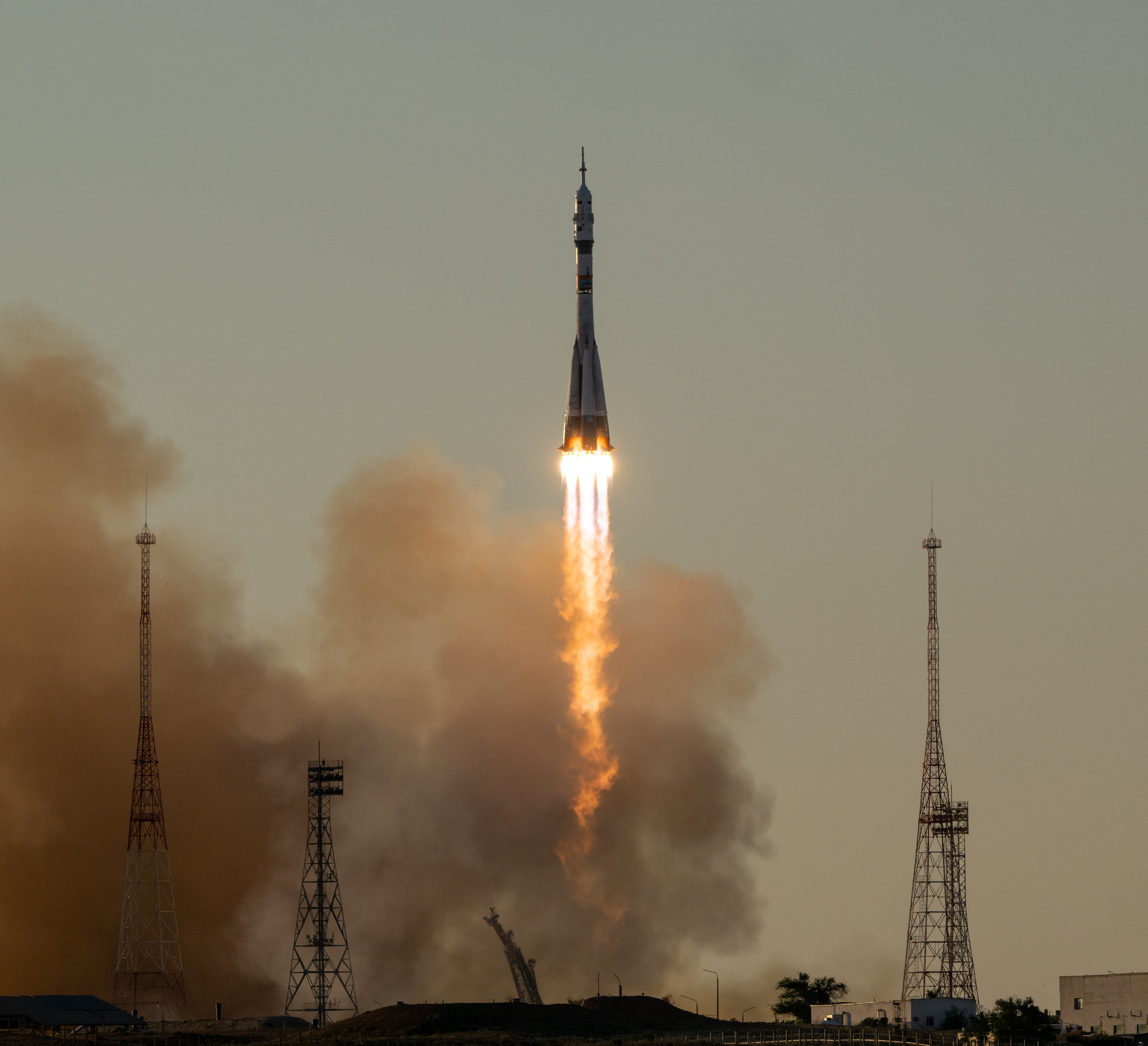
- Soyuz MS-29 during launch on 14 July 2026
- Names: ISS 75S
- Mission type: ISS crew transport
- Operator: Roscosmos
- COSPAR ID: 2026-162A
- SATCAT no.: 100057
- Mission duration: 107 days, 1 hour and 13 minutes (in progress); 265 days (planned)

Spacecraft properties
- Spacecraft: Soyuz MS-29 No. 759
- Spacecraft type: Soyuz MS
- Manufacturer: Energia

Crew
- Crew size: 3
- Members: Pyotr Dubrov; Anna Kikina; Anil Menon
- Callsign: Tigris
- Expedition: Expedition 74/75

Start of mission
- Launch date: 14 July 2026, 14:47:43 UTC
- Rocket: Soyuz-2.1a
- Launch site: Baikonur, Site 31/6
- Contractor: RKTs Progress

End of mission
- Landing date: 5 April 2027 (planned)
- Landing site: Kazakh Steppe, Kazakhstan

Orbital parameters
- Reference system: Geocentric orbit
- Regime: Low Earth orbit
- Inclination: 51.66°

Docking with ISS
- Docking port: Prichal nadir
- Docking date: 14 July 2026, 17:52 UTC
- Undocking date: 5 April 2027 (planned)
- Time docked: 106 days, 22 hours and 9 minutes (in progress)
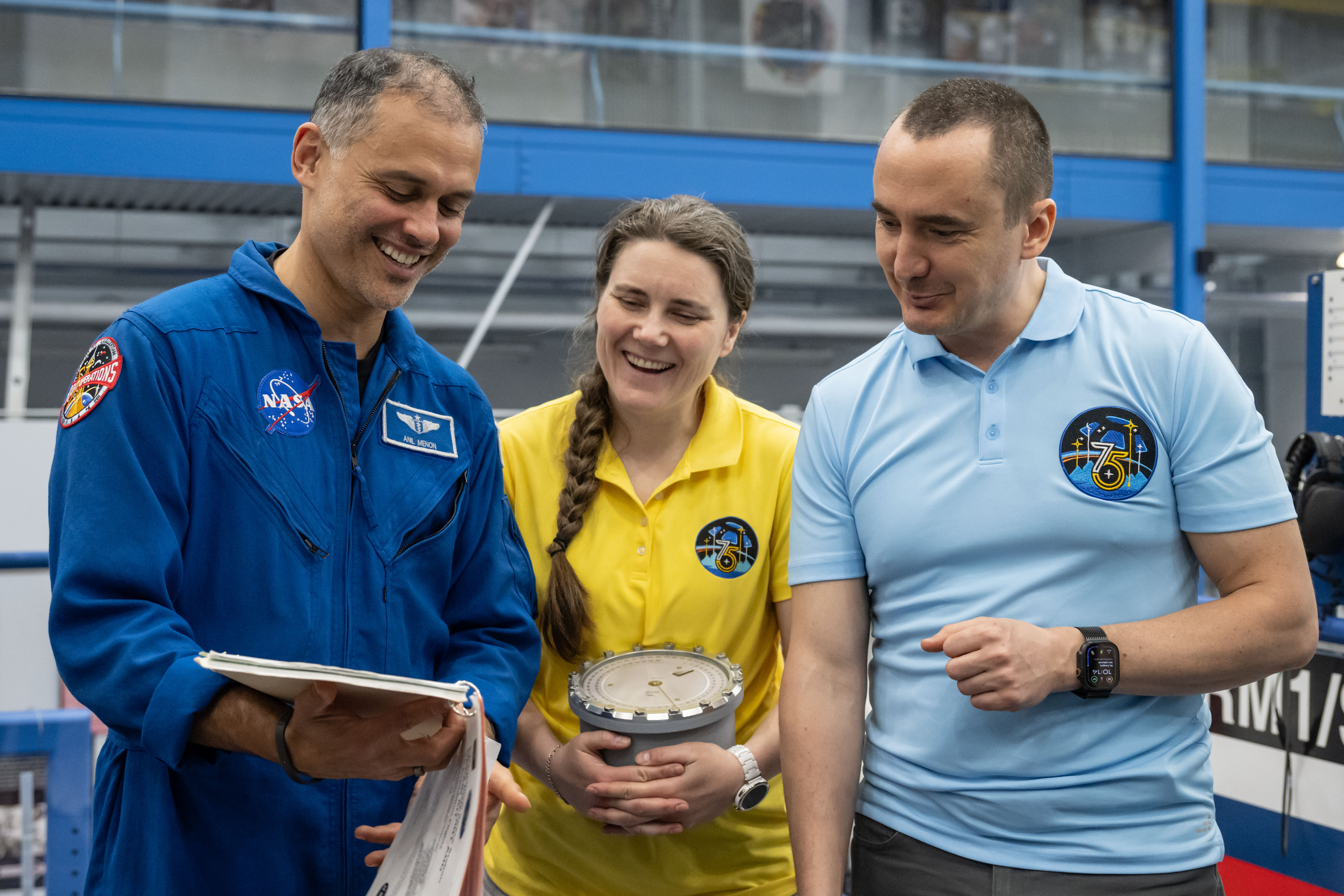
- Mission insignia Soyuz MS-29 crew training at Johnson Space Center. From left: Menon, Kikina, and Dubrov. Soyuz programme

Soyuz MS-29, identified by NASA as Soyuz 75S, is a Russian crewed Soyuz spaceflight launched from Site 31/6 at the Baikonur Cosmodrome on 14 July 2026 to the International Space Station, where it docked to the nadir port of the Prichal module, delivering three members of the Expedition 74/75 crew.

== Mission ==
The spacecraft for the mission (No. 759) was delivered to the Baikonur Cosmodrome on 7 November 2025. Preparations for launch began in late May 2026, including testing of the spacecraft's Kurs rendezvous system, leak checks in a vacuum chamber, and verification of propulsion, guidance, and communications systems.

In late June 2026, the spacecraft underwent propellant loading and final processing. After fit checks and spacecraft familiarization, the spacecraft was integrated with its Soyuz-2.1a launch vehicle, which rolled out to Site 31/6 on 11 July. MS-29 notably was adorned with two paid advertisements. One was for the Unity Charitable Foundation, a charity raising awareness for impoverished children, while the other was for LIT ENERGY an energy drink company. This were the first advert since Russian President Vladimir Putin announced that Roscosmos would sell advertising space on rockets to "reduce the burden on the state budget" on May 20.

Soyuz MS-29 launched on 14 July 2026 at 14:47:43 UTC and entered its planned initial orbit, beginning a two-orbit rendezvous profile with the International Space Station. Following post-launch checks of the spacecraft's systems, it docked automatically with the nadir port of the Prichal module approximately three hours after liftoff.

NASA administrator Jared Isaacman attended the launch, the first visit to Baikonur by a NASA administrator in eight years. Isaacman had previously worked with Anil Menon, who served as the flight surgeon for Isaacman's first private SpaceX mission, and later flew with Menon's wife, Anna Menon, on his second private spaceflight. During the visit, Isaacman met with Roscosmos Director General Dmitry Bakanov and Russian Deputy Prime Minister Denis Manturov. Following the meetings, Bakanov announced that Russia would extend its participation in the ISS program through 2030.

== Crew ==
Prime crew
Position	Crew
Commander	Pyotr Dubrov, Roscosmos; Expedition 74/75; Second spaceflight
Flight engineer	Anna Kikina, Roscosmos; Expedition 74/75; Second spaceflight
Flight engineer	Anil Menon, NASA; Expedition 74/75; First spaceflight

Backup crew
Position	Crew
Commander	Dmitry Petelin, Roscosmos
Flight engineer	Konstantin Borisov, Roscosmos
Flight engineer	Deniz Burnham, NASA

== Gallery ==
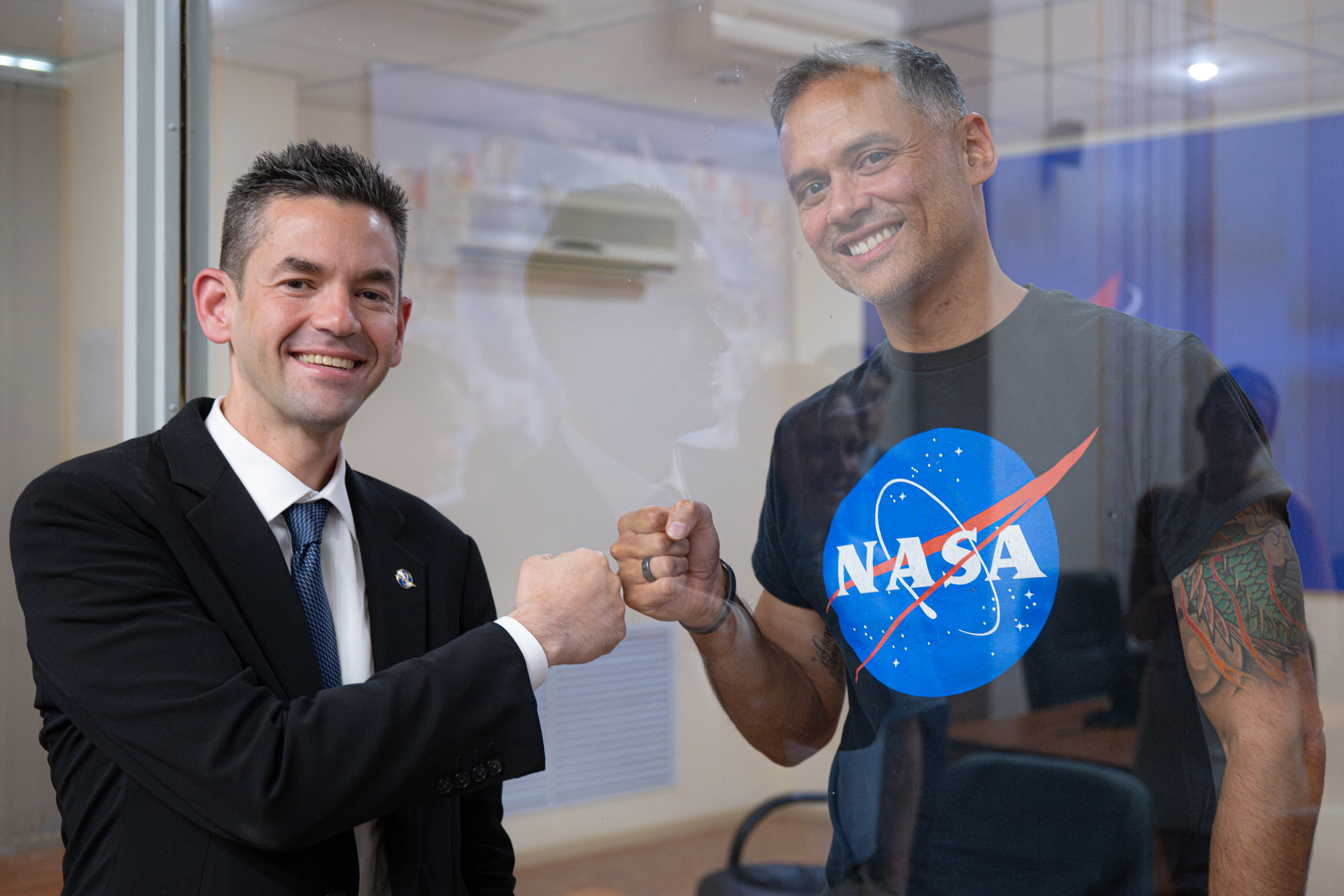
Issacman (left) visiting Menon (right) in pre-flight quarantine

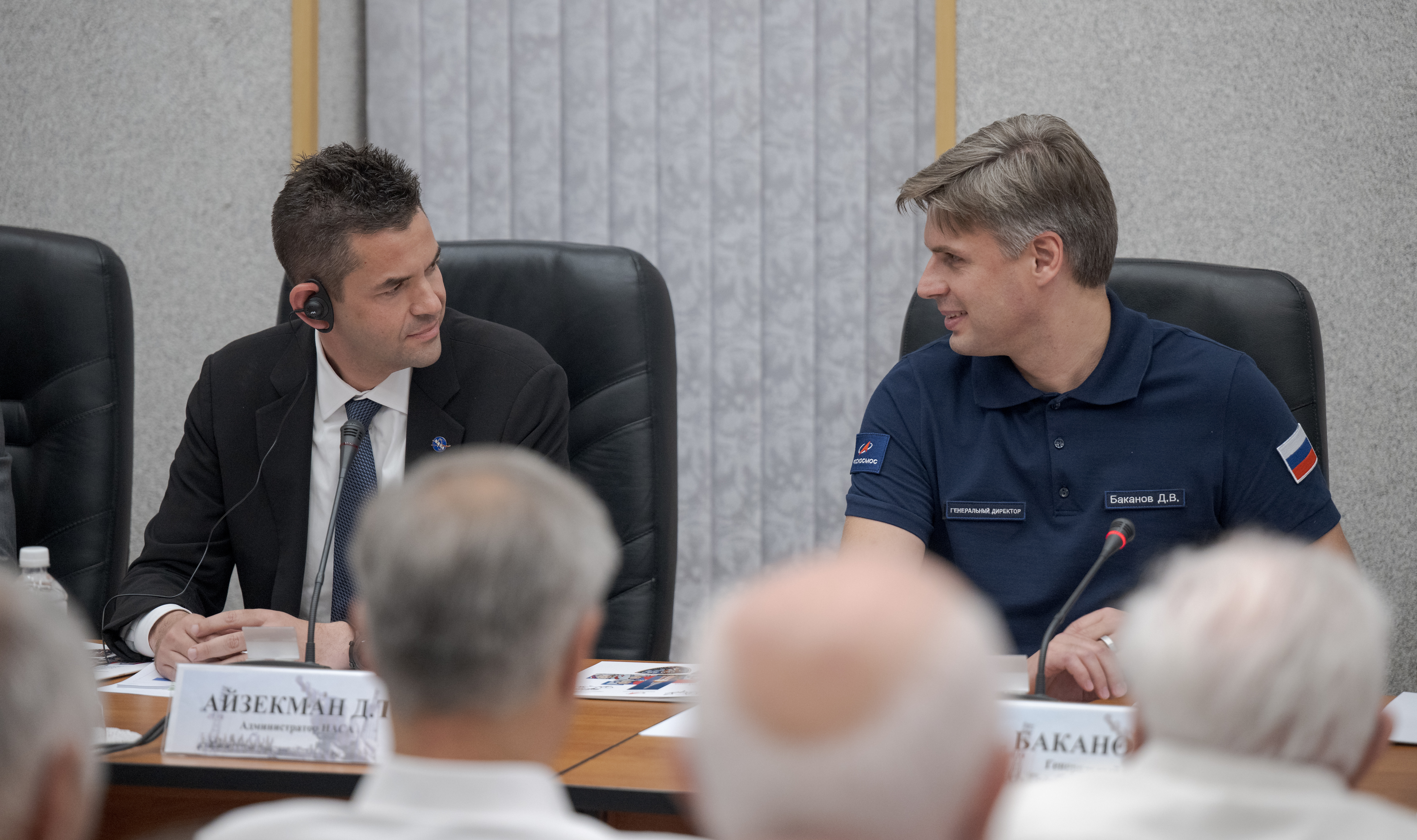
Issacman (left) and Bakanov (right) talk during news conference

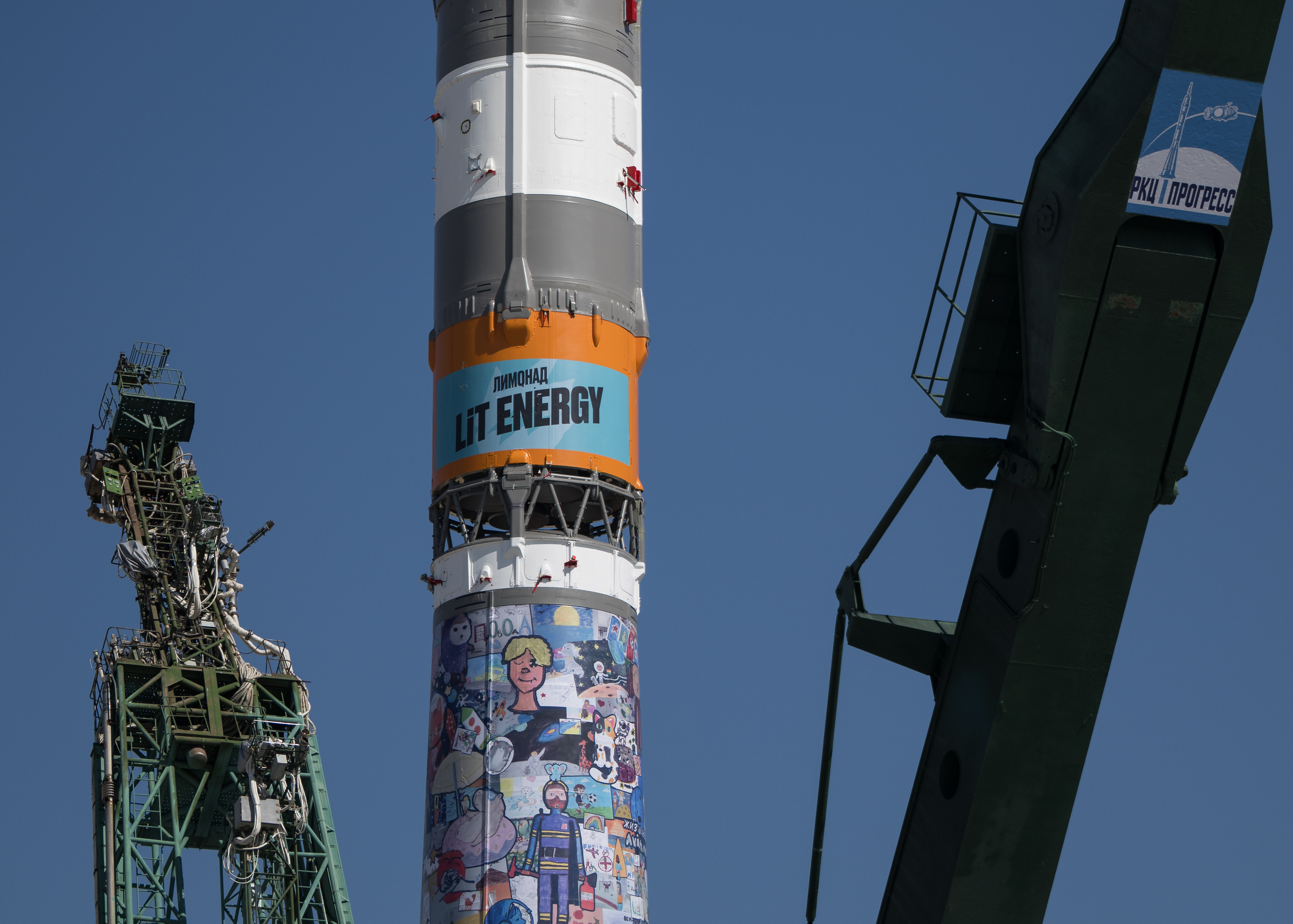
Advertisement on the Soyuz MS-29 rocket

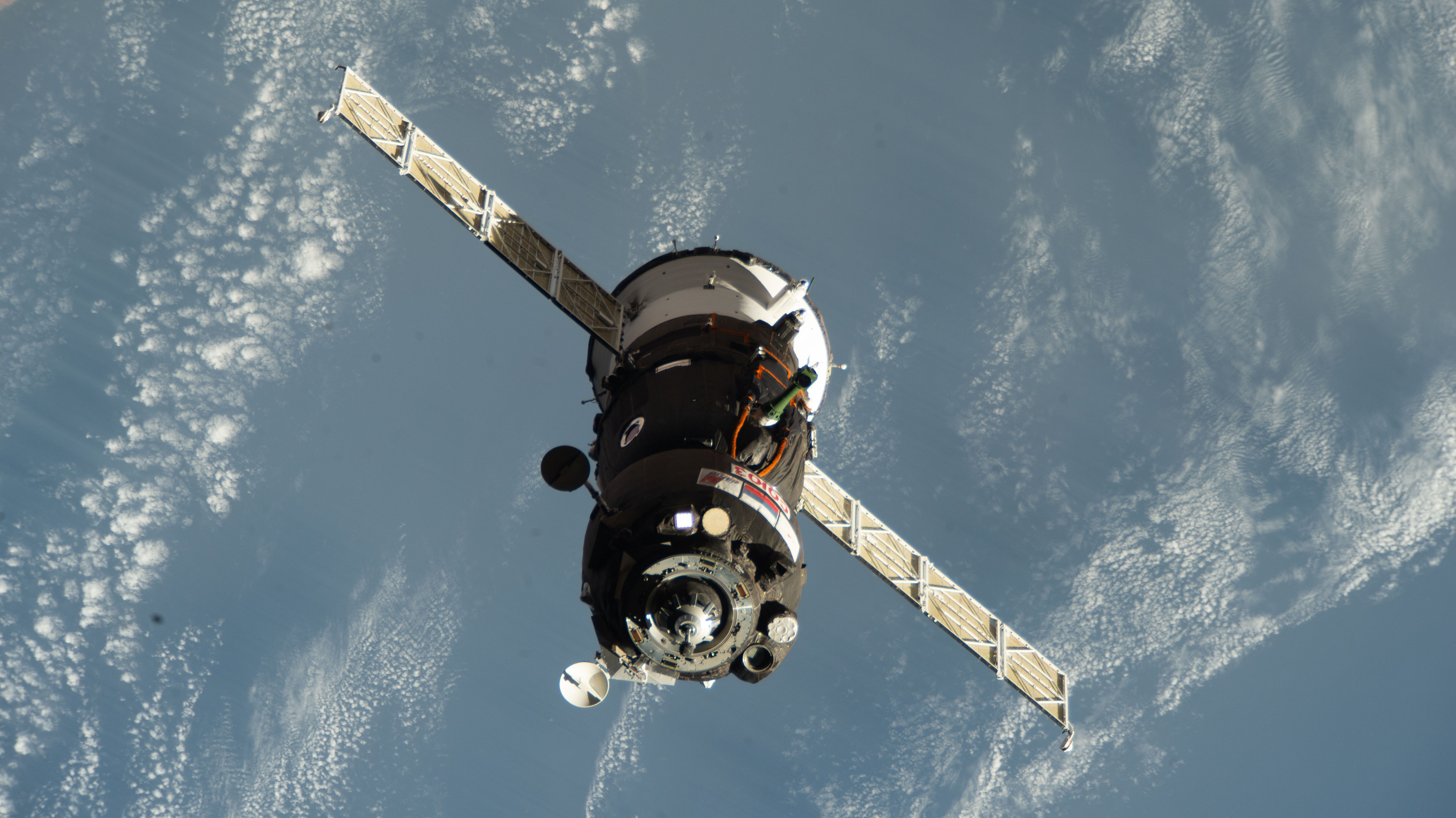
Soyuz MS-29 approaches the ISS
