= Anna Menon =

American engineer and commercial astronaut (born 1985)

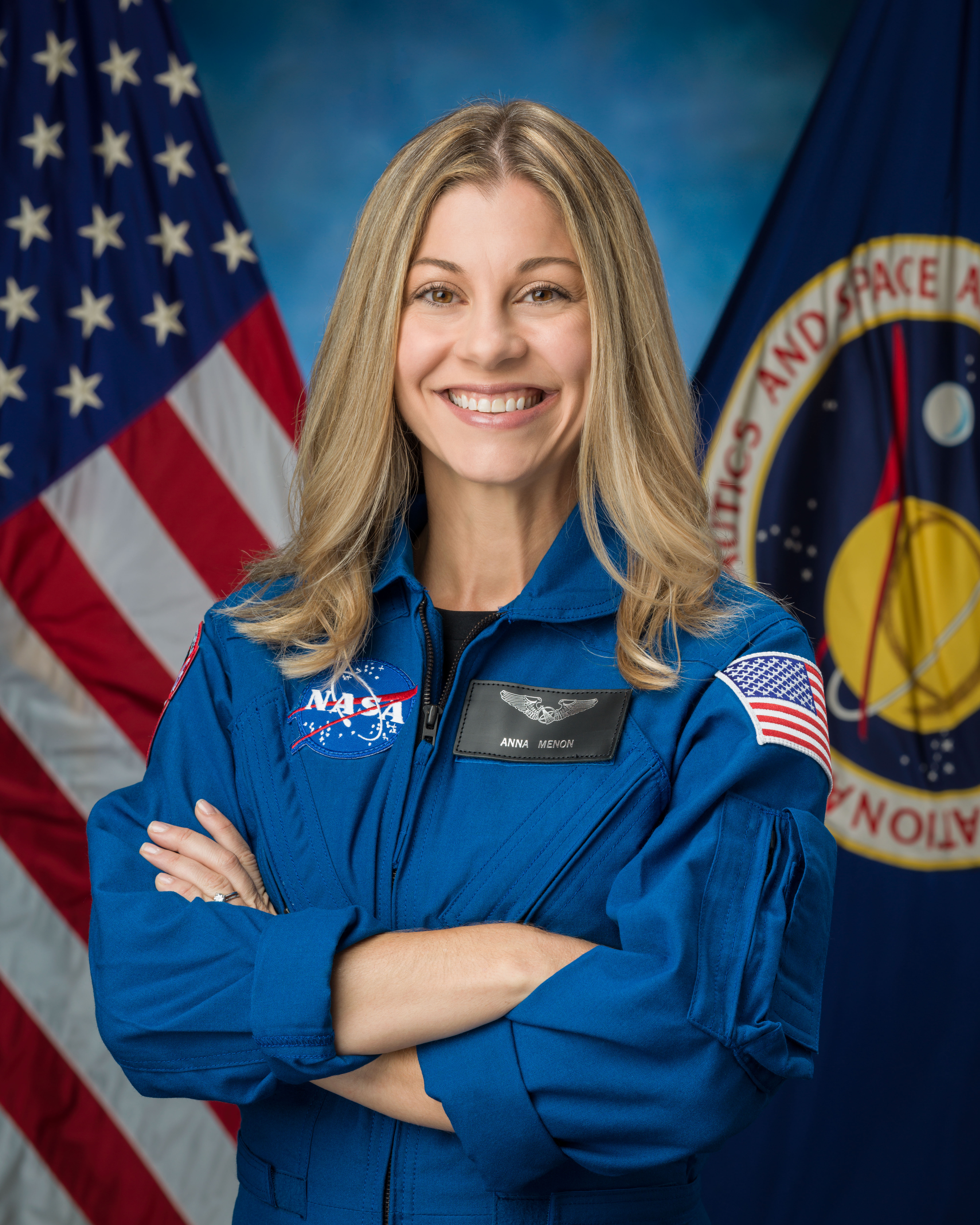
- Menon in 2025
- Born: Anna Wilhelm; December 24, 1985 (age 40); Houston, Texas, U.S.
- Education: Texas Christian University (BS); Duke University (MS)
- Spouse: Anil Menon (m. 2016)
- Children: 2
- Space career

SpaceX commercial astronaut NASA astronaut candidate
- Previous occupation: Lead Space Operations Engineer at SpaceX
- Time in space: 4 days, 22 hours, 13 minutes
- Selection: NASA Group 24 (2025)
- Missions: Polaris Dawn

Anna Menon (née Wilhelm; born December 24, 1985) is an American engineer and NASA astronaut candidate, formerly employed by SpaceX as lead space operations and a mission director. She flew on Polaris Dawn, a private human spaceflight mission operated by SpaceX on behalf of Jared Isaacman. During the September 2024 mission, she served as the onboard medical officer and, along with Sarah Gillis, set a record for women traveling farthest from Earth, later broken by Christina Koch of Artemis II. She was selected in September 2025 as a member of NASA Astronaut Group 24.

Menon previously worked as a biomedical flight controller at NASA for seven years, overseeing operations at the International Space Station before joining SpaceX and returning to NASA as an astronaut.

== Education ==
Menon graduated from Texas Christian University in 2008 with a Bachelor of Science degree in mathematics and Spanish. She went on to earn a Master of Science degree in biomedical engineering from Duke University in 2010.

Menon was also a member of the Iota Lambda chapter of Alpha Chi Omega sorority at Texas Christian University.

== Career ==
=== NASA flight controller ===
Menon worked at NASA for seven years, and for six of those years she served as a biomedical flight controller for the International Space Station, assisting ISS crews from NASA's Johnson Space Center in Houston, Texas, and leading biomedical operations for Expedition 41 including ISS US EVA's 27 and 28.

=== SpaceX ===
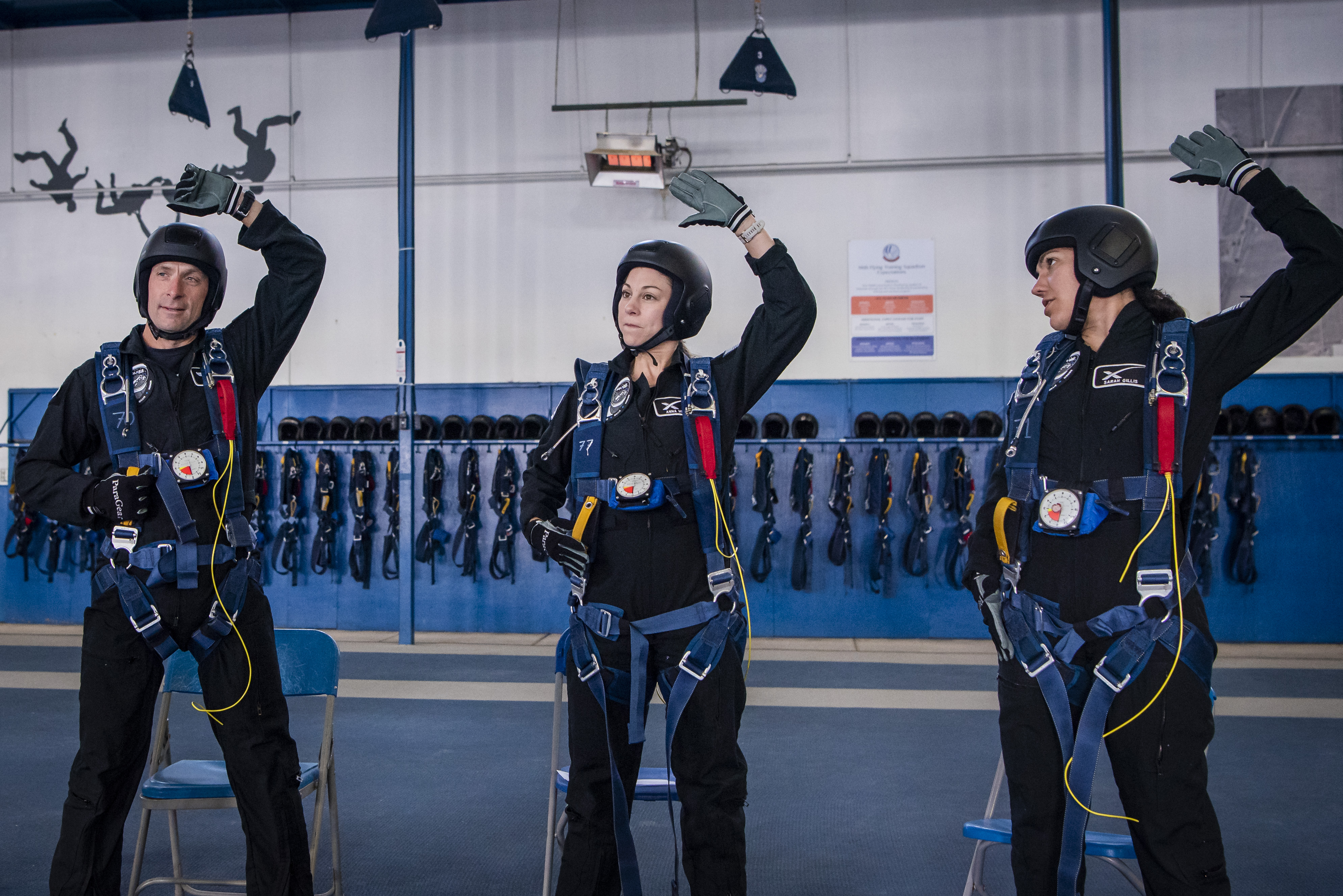
Anna (middle) with her crewmates during Polaris Dawn's Parachute Training

Menon joined SpaceX in July 2018 as a Space Operations Engineer. She was promoted to Lead Space Operations Engineer in November 2019. In her position, she manages the development of crew operations, ensuring that procedures and protocols are in place for astronauts during their missions. She also served in the company's mission control, including during the Demo-2 flight. During Inspiration4, a private spaceflight funded by billionaire Jared Isaacman, she served as technical adviser to the family members of the all-civilian crew, explaining the complexities of spaceflight. Shortly after Isaacman returned from space, he picked Menon to be part of his Polaris Dawn mission. During the mission, Menon served as the on-board medical officer and helped carry out science experiments during the trip.

=== NASA astronaut ===
Menon was selected in September 2025 as a member of NASA Astronaut Group 24. She is the first candidate selected by NASA to have flown on a private orbital spaceflight prior to joining the NASA Astronaut Corps.

== Personal life ==
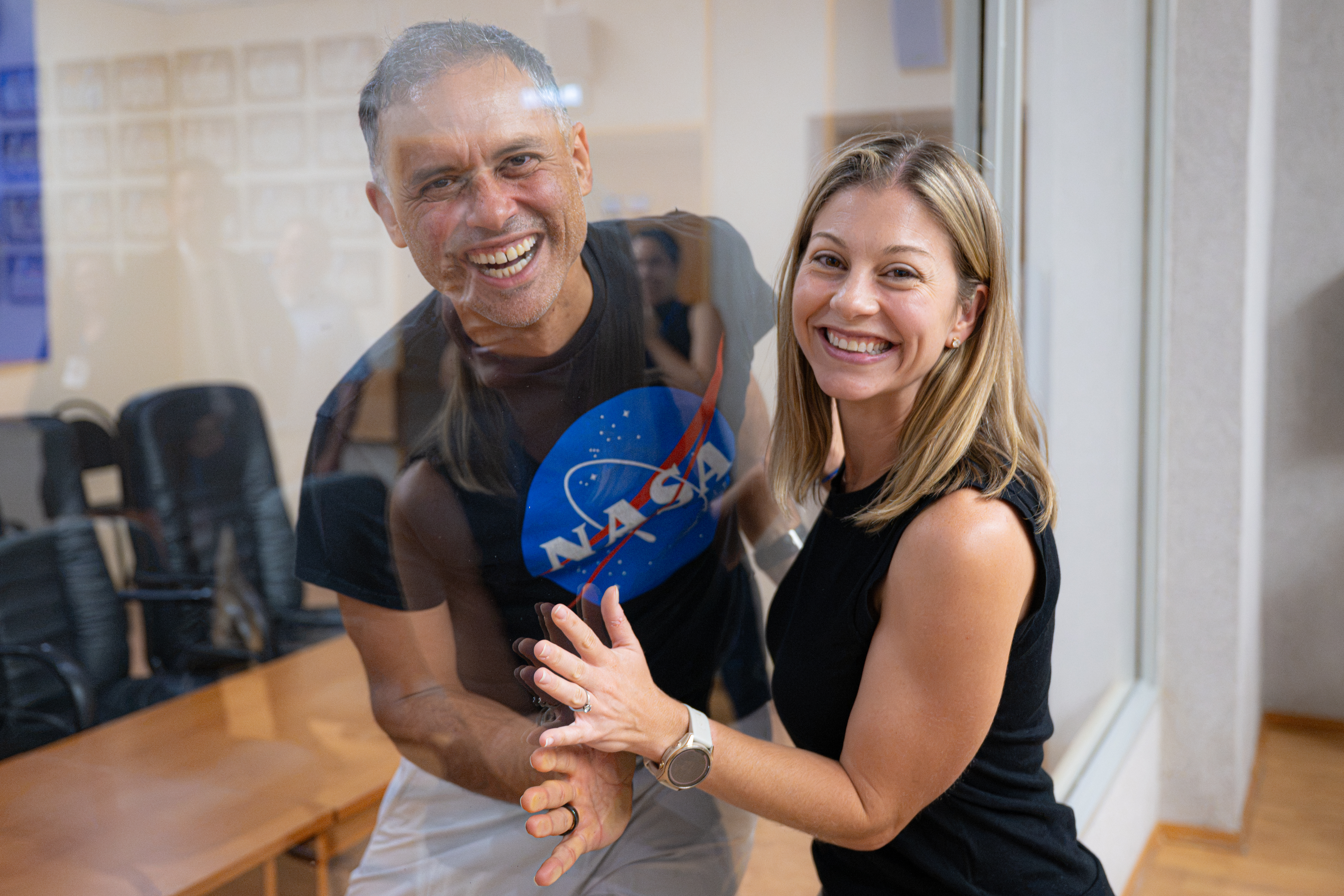
Anna Menon and her husband, Anil, at the Cosmonaut Hotel in Baikonur, Kazakhstan, for his Soyuz MS-29 preflight preparations

Anna married Anil Menon, who is a NASA astronaut and former SpaceX medical director, on October 15, 2016, in a ceremony in Houston. They have two children together. Both she and her husband appeared in the final episode of the five-episode television documentary entitled Countdown: Inspiration4 Mission to Space, released on Netflix in September 2021. In June of 2024, Anna published Kisses from Space, a children's book that is described as being "the story of a mama dragon coming home from an out-of-this-world adventure and, snuggling her baby dragons close, she tells them of her journey and how she thought of them the entire time." She planned to read the book to her kids while on the spacecraft to remind them that she is always thinking of them. SpaceX shared that a video of her reading the book will be shown to her children live.

== See also ==
- Polaris program
