= Siberian State University of Water Transport =

University in Novosibirsk, Russia

- Сибирский государственный университет водного транспорта
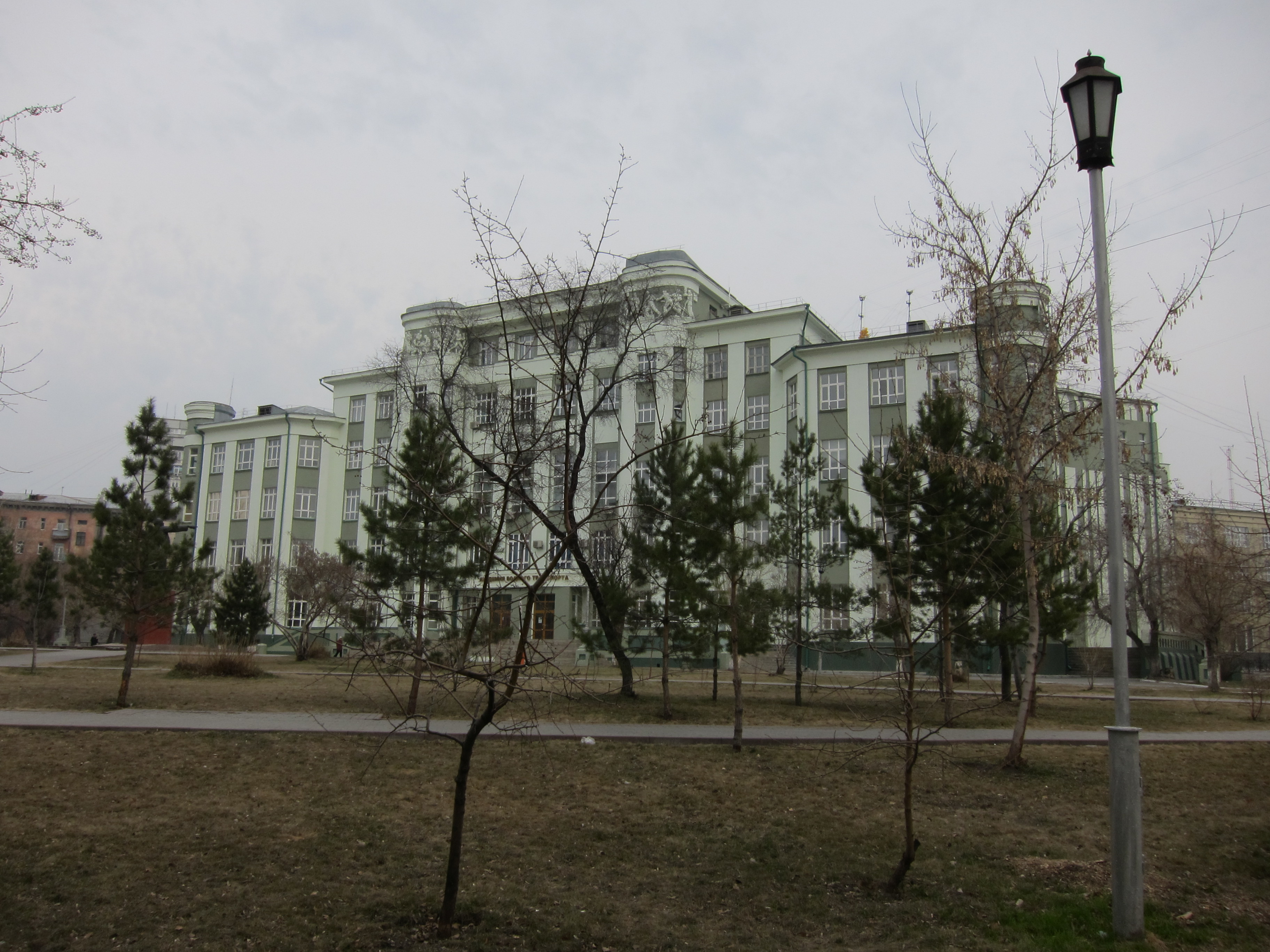
- Type: State University
- Established: 1951
- Location: Novosibirsk, Russia
- Website: www.ssuwt.ru

Siberian State University of Water Transport (Russian: Сибирский государственный университет водного транспорта) is a state university in Zheleznodorozhny District of Novosibirsk, Russia. It was founded in 1951.

== History ==
In 1951, the Novosibirsk Institute of Water Transport Engineers was established. From 1994 to 2015, it was called Novosibirsk State Academy of Water Transport. In 2015, the academy was renamed into Siberian State University of Water Transport.

== Faculties ==
- Electromechanical Faculty
- Ship-Mechanical Faculty
- Hydraulic Engineering Faculty
- Navigation Faculty
- Water Transport Management
- Extramural Faculty

== Branches ==
The structure of the university includes branches in Omsk, Krasnoyarsk, Khabarovsk, Ust-Kut and Yakutsk.

== Notable alumni ==
- Vasily Yurchenko (born 1960), Russian politician, the governor of Novosibirsk Oblast (2010—2014).
- Anna Kikina (born 1984), Russian engineer and test cosmonaut.
