= Pyotr Dubrov =

Russian engineer and cosmonaut (born 1978)

- Пётр Дубров
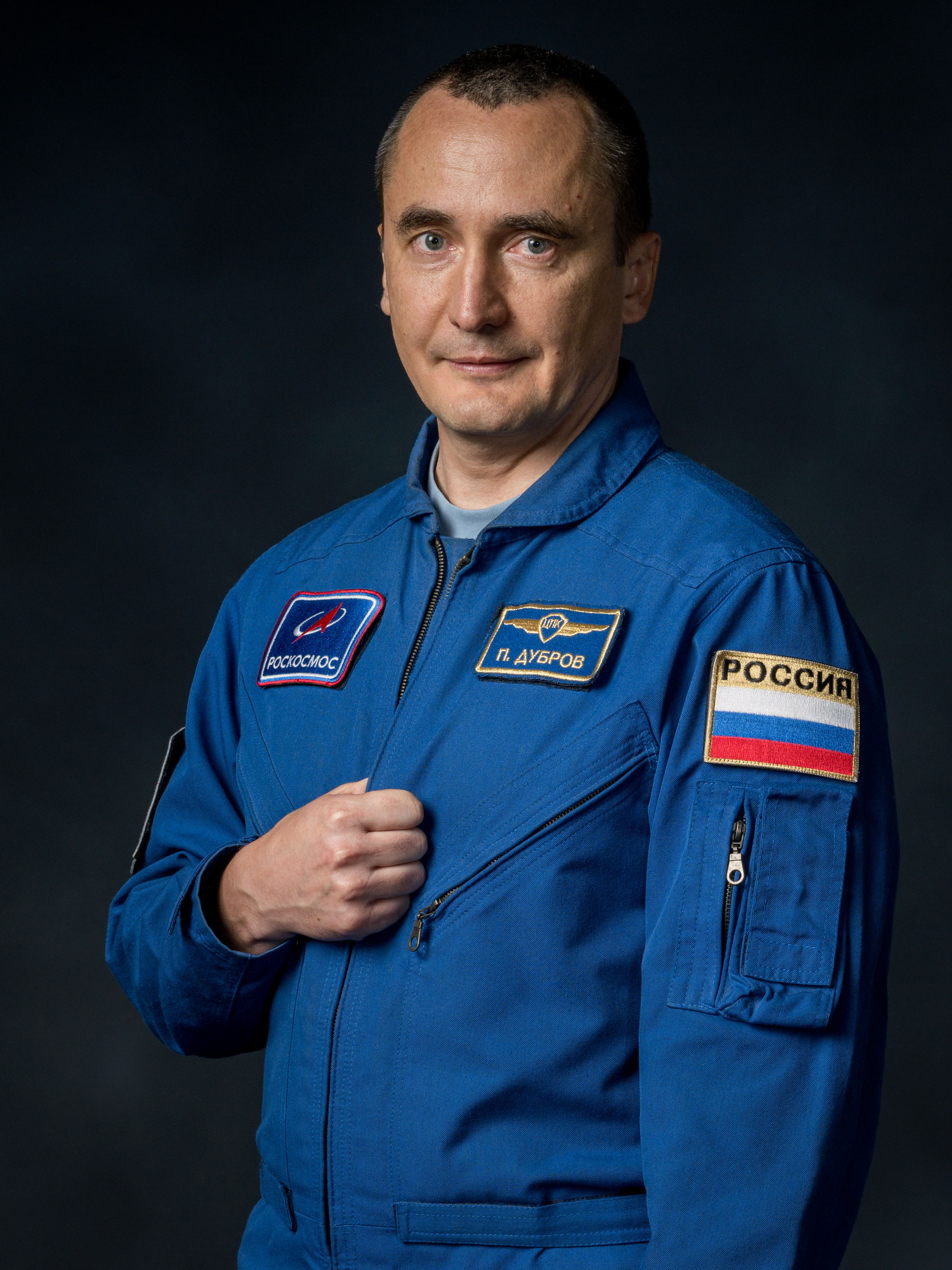
- Dubrov in 2025
- Born: 30 January 1978 (age 48); Khabarovsk, Russian SFSR, USSR
- Space career

Roscosmos cosmonaut
- Previous occupation: Software engineer
- Status: Active
- Time in space: 437 days, 12 hours, 15 minutes (currently in space)
- Selection: TsPK 2012 Cosmonaut Group
- Total EVAs: 4
- Total EVA time: 29 hours, 49 minutes
- Missions: Soyuz MS-18/MS-19 (Expedition 64/65/66); Soyuz MS-29 (Expedition 74/75)
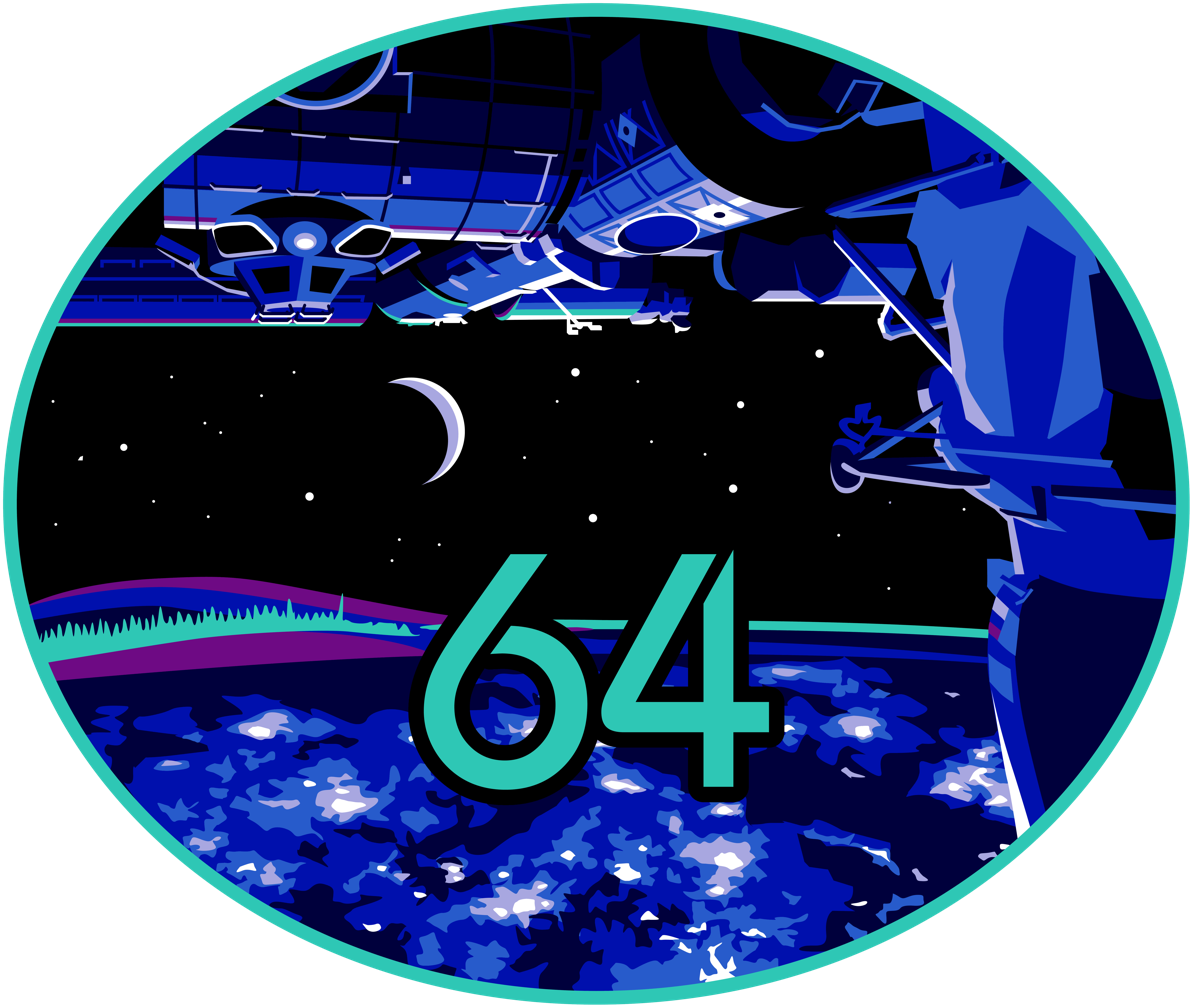
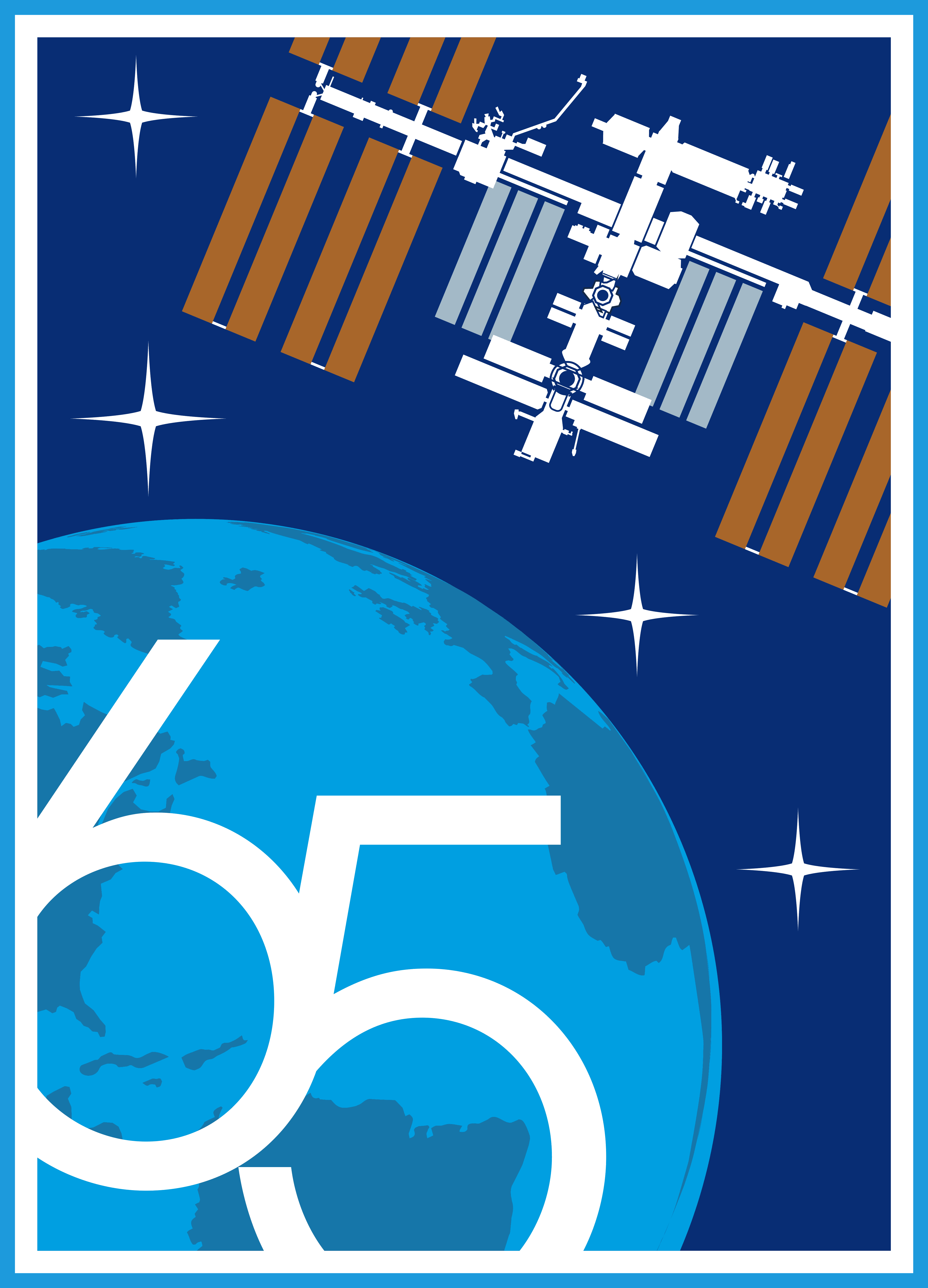
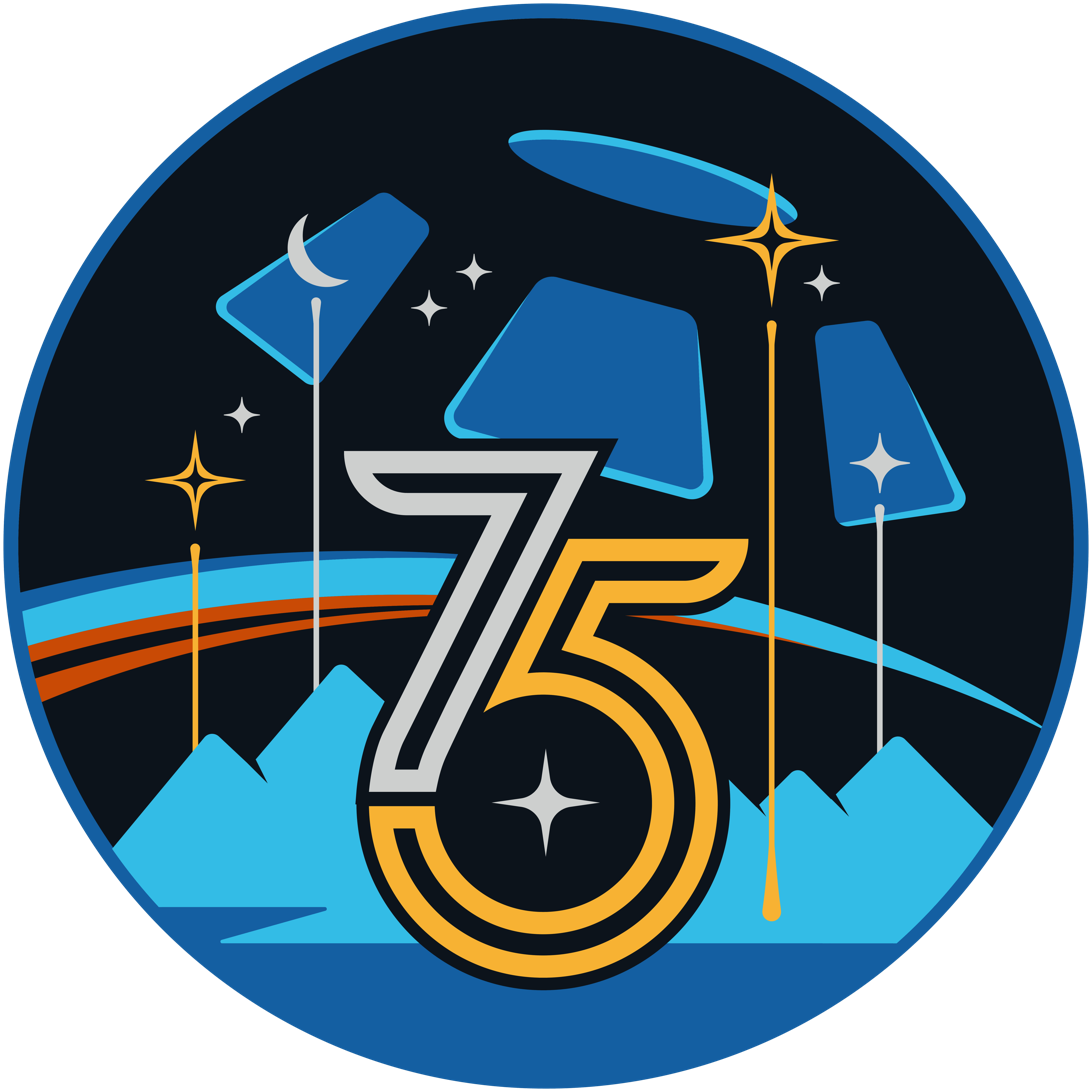
- Mission insignia

Pyotr Valerievich Dubrov (Russian: Пётр Валерьевич Дубров; born 30 January 1978) is a Russian engineer and cosmonaut selected by Roscosmos in 2012.

== Early life and education ==
Dubrov was born on 30 January 1978 in Khabarovsk, Russia SFSR. He attended secondary school No. 13 of Khabarovsk and went on to study at Khabarovsk State Technical University, graduating in 1999 with a degree in Software for Computer Engineering and Automated Systems. After graduating he went on to work as a senior software engineer at CBOSS Development International LLC.

== Cosmonaut career ==
Dubrov was selected by Roscosmos as a cosmonaut on 8 October 2012, as one of eight cosmonauts selected as part of Roscosmos's 2012 selection group. Included in his group was Anna Kikina, one of very few female cosmonauts selected by the agency.

Dubrov and his seven group mates began training at the Yuri Gagarin Cosmonaut Training Center on 29 October 2012. From 4 to 6 February 2013, he participated in winter survival training alongside cosmonauts Anna Kikina and Oleg Blinov, training for an unlikely emergency Soyuz landing, in which rescue crews are not able to reach the spacecraft for several days. He graduated from cosmonaut training on 15 July 2014.

In 2020, he was assigned to the backup crew of Soyuz MS-17, backing up Russian cosmonaut Sergey Kud-Sverchkov as flight engineer on ISS Expedition 63/64. Amidst the COVID-19 pandemic, he traveled to the Johnson Space Center in Houston, Texas for training on the ISS USOS.

=== Expedition 64/65/66 ===
Dubrov launched aboard Soyuz MS-18 in April 2021 for his first long duration mission aboard the International Space Station. He returned to Earth along with Mark T. Vande Hei with Soyuz MS-19 on 30 March 2022, having spent a total of 355 days in space.

=== Expedition 74/75 ===
Dubrov launched aboard Soyuz MS-29 in July 2026 for his second long duration mission aboard the International Space Station. He is expected to return to Earth in April 2027 after eight months in space.

== Cinematography ==
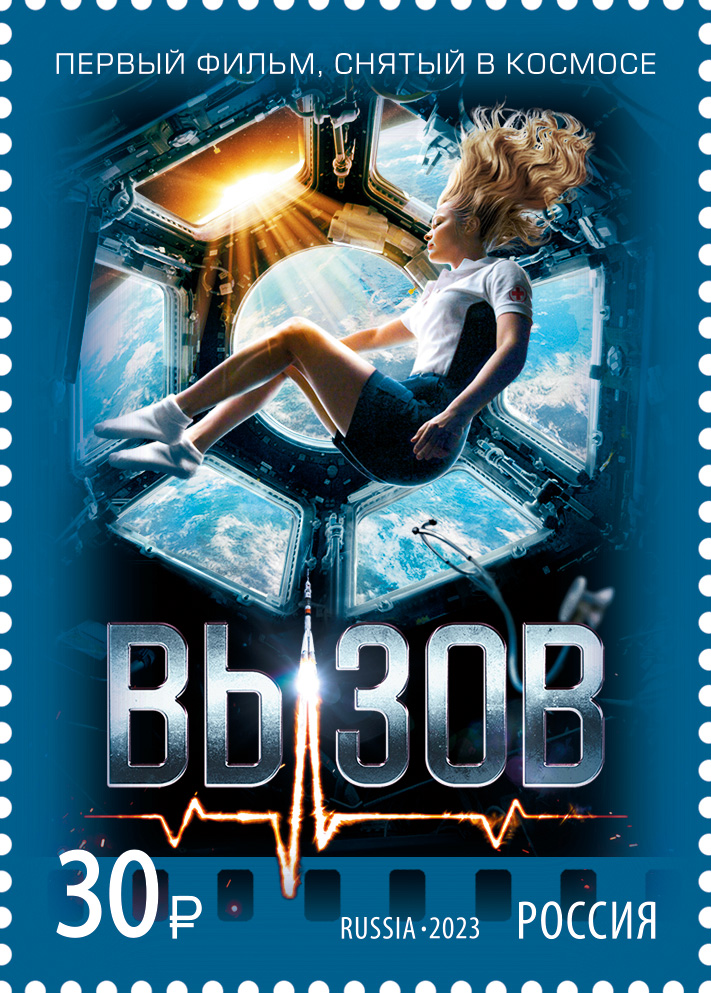
Russian stamp dedicated to the film The Challenge

On 14 May 2021 the Interagency Committee approved the composition of the ISS main and alternate crews for the period 2021–2023. Anton Shkaplerov and the crew of the film The Challenge: actress Yulia Peresild and director Klim Shipenko, launched to the ISS on the Soyuz MS-19. The drama is a joint project of Roscosmos, Channel One and the Yellow, Black and White studio. The alternates chosen after passing the medical committee are: New Drama Theater actress Alyona Mordovina, director Alexey Dudin and the commander Oleg Artemyev. Since 24 May the crew members have been training at the Yuri Gagarin Cosmonaut Training Center. On 23 July the prime crew participated in a four-hour simulation inside a Soyuz replica while wearing the Sokol suit, and on 30 July, the spacecraft had its pre-launch preparation started.

The director and actress returned to Earth on 17 October 2021 on Soyuz MS-18 with commander Oleg Novitsky. Dubrov and NASA astronaut Mark Vande Hei, who arrived at the ISS on Soyuz MS-18, joined Shkaplerov on the landing of Soyuz MS-19 on 30 March 2022.

== Awards ==
On 12 April 2023, Dubrov was awarded the title Hero of the Russian Federation.

=== Movie portion shot on ISS ===
Klim Shipenko shot about 35–40 minutes of film on the ISS, as well as taking on the position of director, operator, art director, and makeup artist. Oleg Novitsky and Pyotr Dubrov will appear in the film, with Dubrov and Mark Vande Hei assisting in the production. Shkaplerov will appear in some scenes of the movie.
