= Anil Menon =

Physician and NASA astronaut

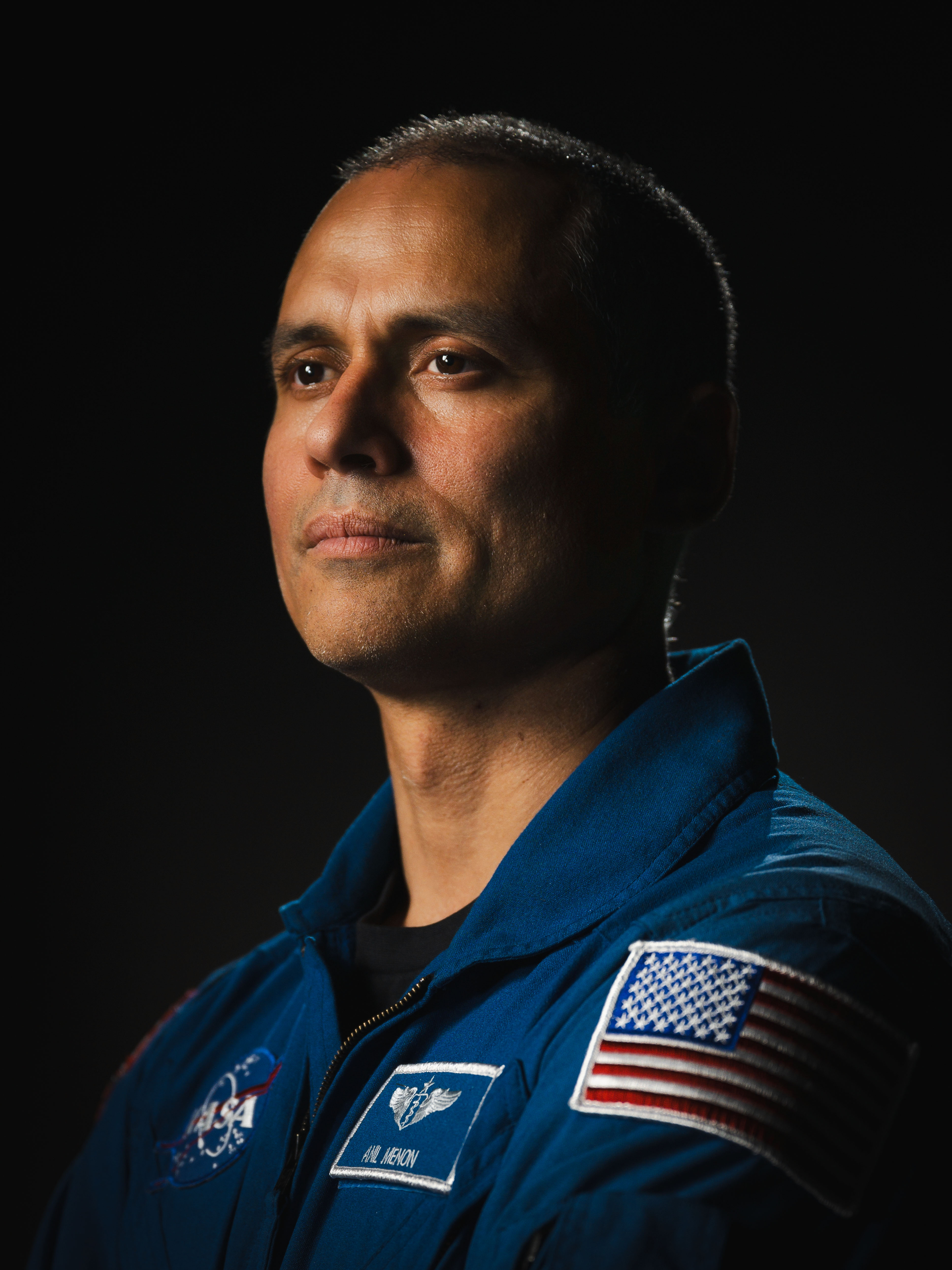
- Menon in 2024
- Born: Anil Madhavan Samoilenko Menon; October 15, 1976 (age 50); Minneapolis, Minnesota, U.S.
- Education: Harvard University (BS); Stanford University (MS, MD); University of Texas Medical Branch (MPH)
- Spouse: Anna Menon (m. 2016)
- Children: 2
- Space career

NASA astronaut
- Previous occupation: Flight surgeon
- Rank: Colonel, US Space Force
- Time in space: 114 days, 8 hours, 31 minutes [] (currently in space)
- Selection: NASA Group 23 (2021)
- Total EVAs: 5
- Total EVA time: 33 hours, 30 minutes
- Missions: Soyuz MS-29 (Expedition 74/75)
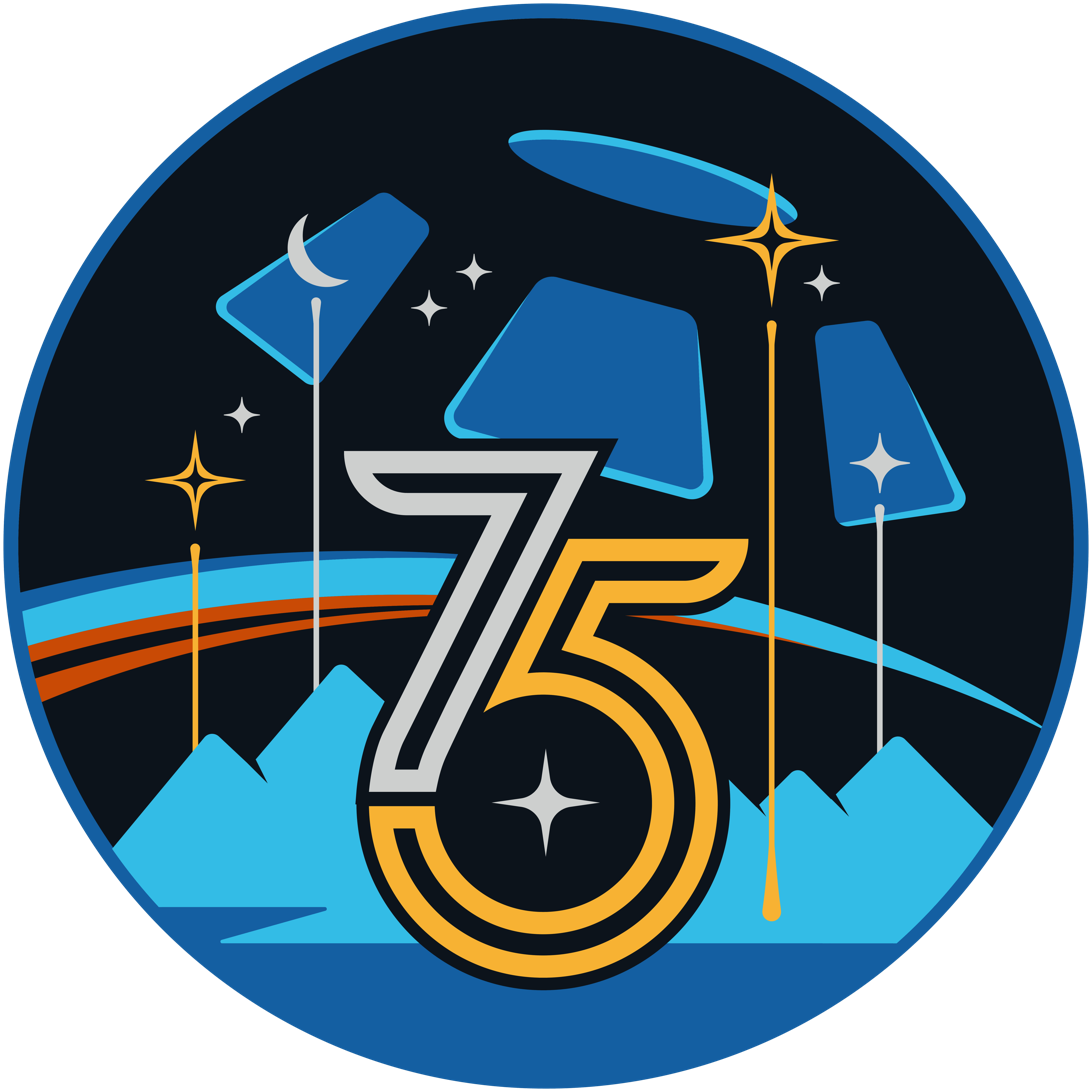
- Mission insignia

Anil Madhavan Samoilenko Menon (born October 15, 1976) is a colonel in the United States Space Force, emergency medicine physician and associate professor at McGovern Medical School, and NASA astronaut. He was a flight surgeon at NASA and the medical director at SpaceX before being selected as a candidate for an astronaut at NASA.

== Early life and education ==
Anil Menon was born in Minneapolis, Minnesota, to Shankaran Menon and Elizabeth Samoylenko. His father is an Indian immigrant from Kerala, while his mother is an immigrant from Ukraine. He is the great-grandson of Chettur Sankaran Nair.

Menon attended the St. Paul Academy and Summit School in Saint Paul. He graduated in Neurobiology from Harvard University. He then earned an M.S. in Mechanical Engineering and an M.D. He thereafter completed residencies in Emergency Medicine and in Aerospace Medicine and received an M.P.H. from the University of Texas Medical Branch.

== Air Force and Space Force career ==
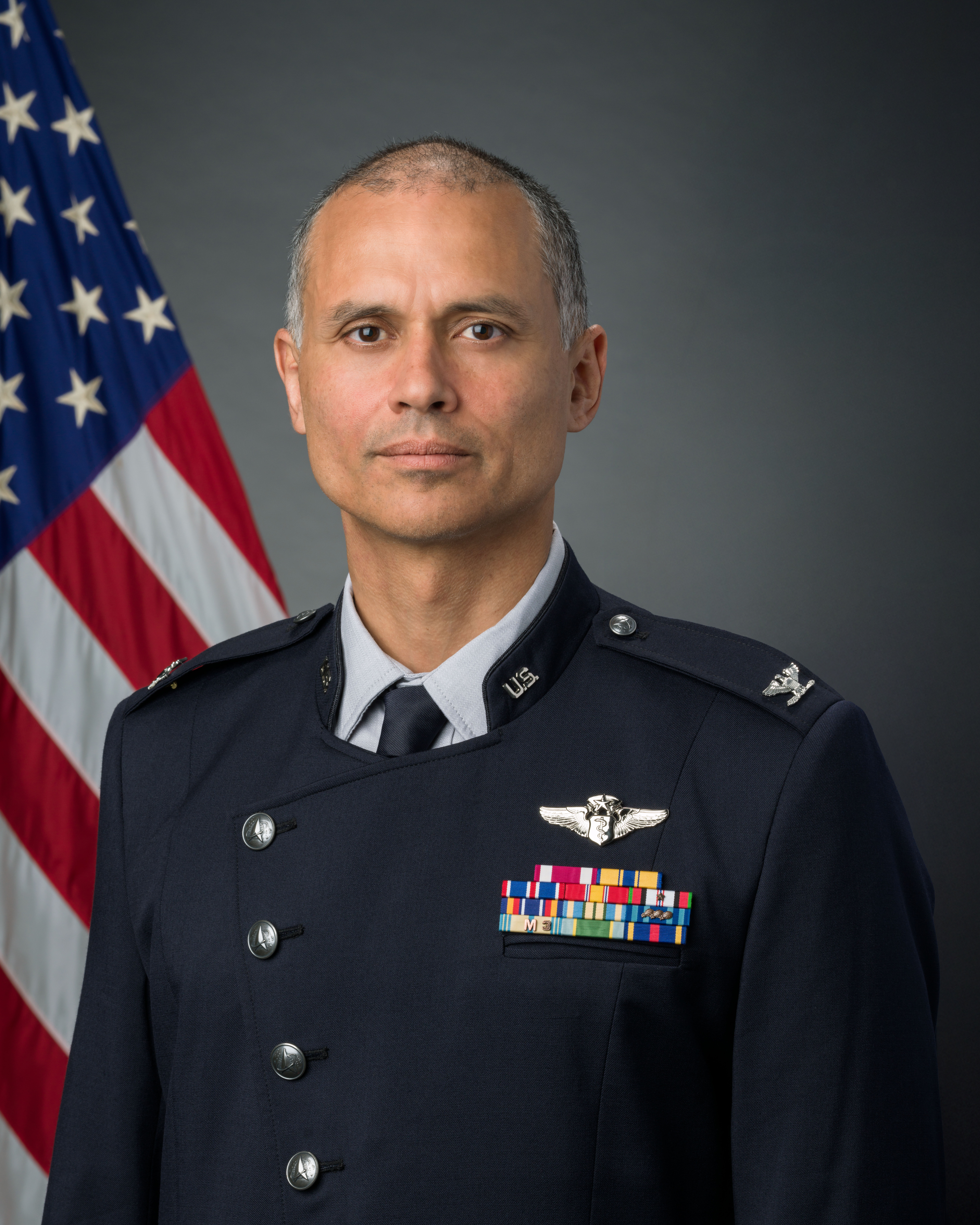
Official USSF portrait, 2026

Anil Menon was transferred to the 173rd Fighter Wing for military duty and pursued a residency in aerospace medicine at the University of Texas Medical Branch, where he published his thesis on medical kits for commercial spaceflight. During his aerospace training, he deployed twice with the U.S. Air Force critical care air transport team to treat and transport wounded warriors. He later transferred to the Air Force reserves, 45th operational group, Detachment 3 of the 45th Space Wing to provide medical direction for launch and landings.

Menon was promoted to colonel and transferred to the United States Space Force in January 2026.

== Flight Surgeon career ==
=== Air Force ===
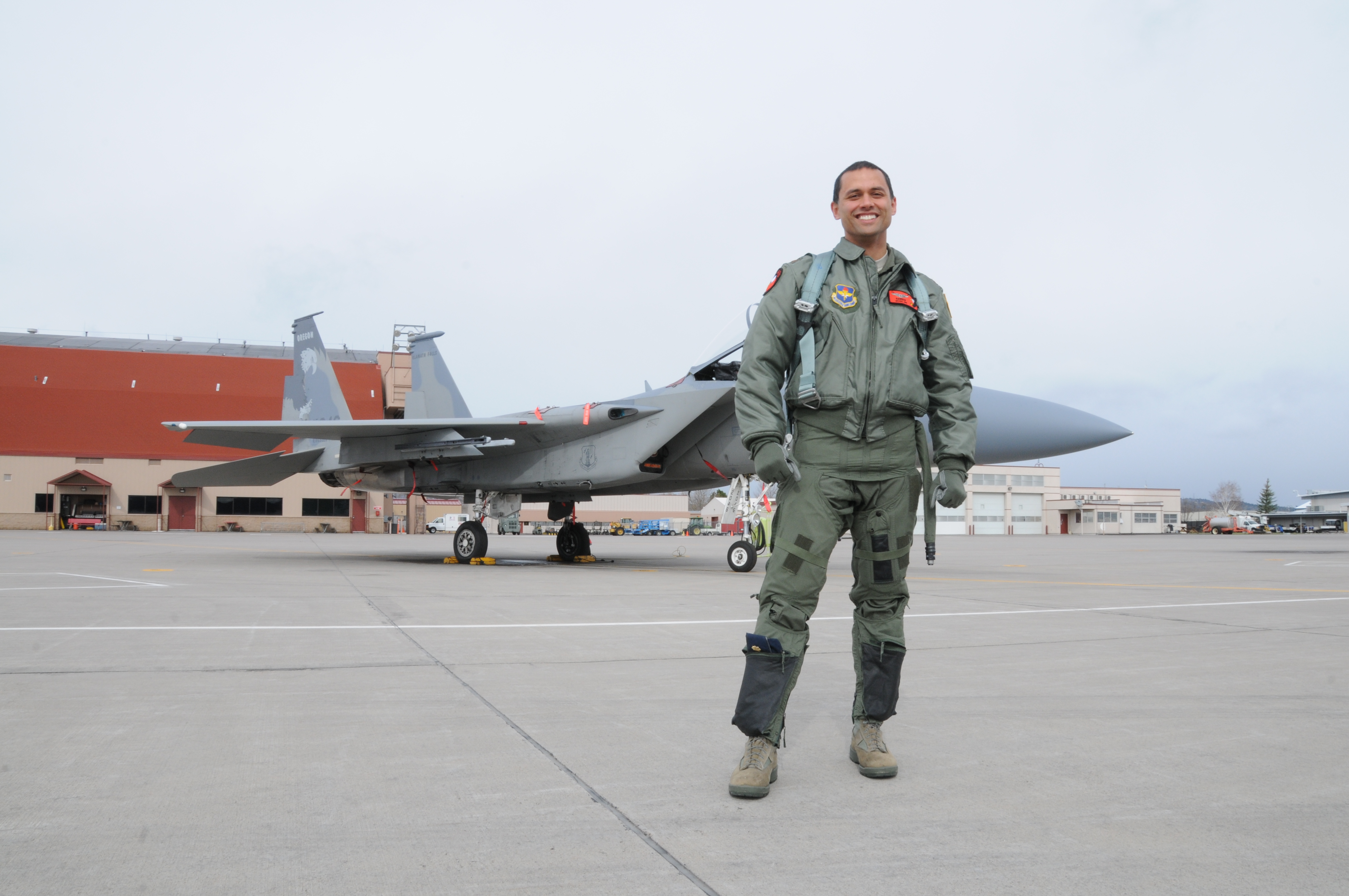
Menon poses in front of an F-15 Eagle at Kingsley Field in Klamath Falls, Oregon

Menon is an actively practicing emergency medicine physician with fellowship training in wilderness and aerospace medicine. As a physician, he was a first responder and joined the International Medical Corps in 2010 during the 2010 earthquake in Haiti, 2015 earthquake in Nepal, and the 2011 Reno Air Show accident. In the Air Force, Menon supported the 45th Space Wing as a flight surgeon and the 173rd Fighter Wing, where he logged over 100 sorties in the F-15 fighter jet and transported over 100 patients as part of the critical care air transport team.

=== NASA ===
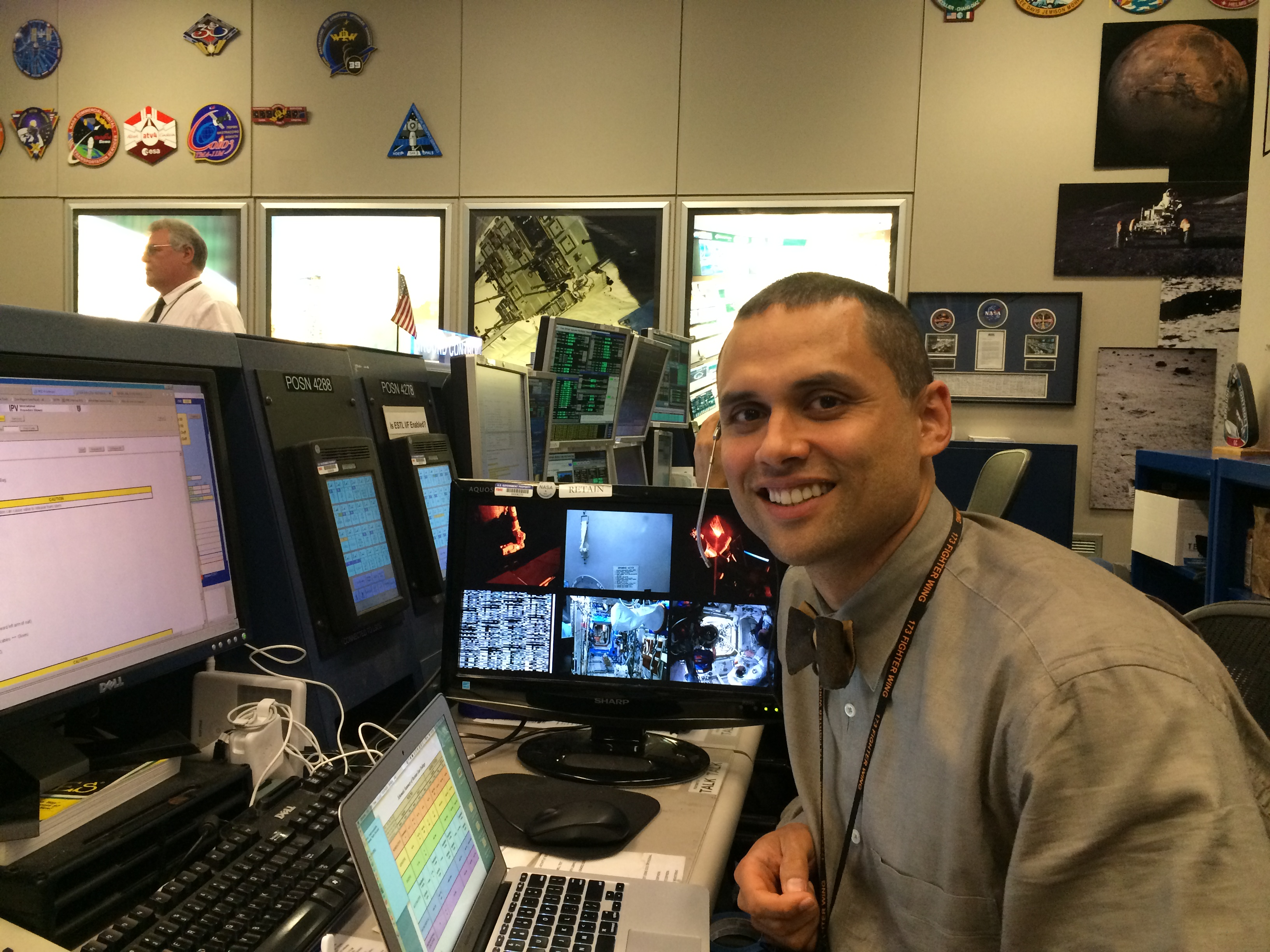
Menon at the Mission Control Center in Houston

Menon started as a NASA flight surgeon in 2014. He supported four long-duration crew members on the International Space Station as the deputy crew surgeon for Soyuz missions Soyuz TMA-13M and Soyuz TMA-17M and prime crew surgeon for Soyuz MS-06. As a member of the Human Health and Performance Directorate, he also served as the medical lead for the health maintenance system and direct return aircraft development. He lived and worked in Star City, Russia for more than six months.

=== SpaceX Medical Director ===
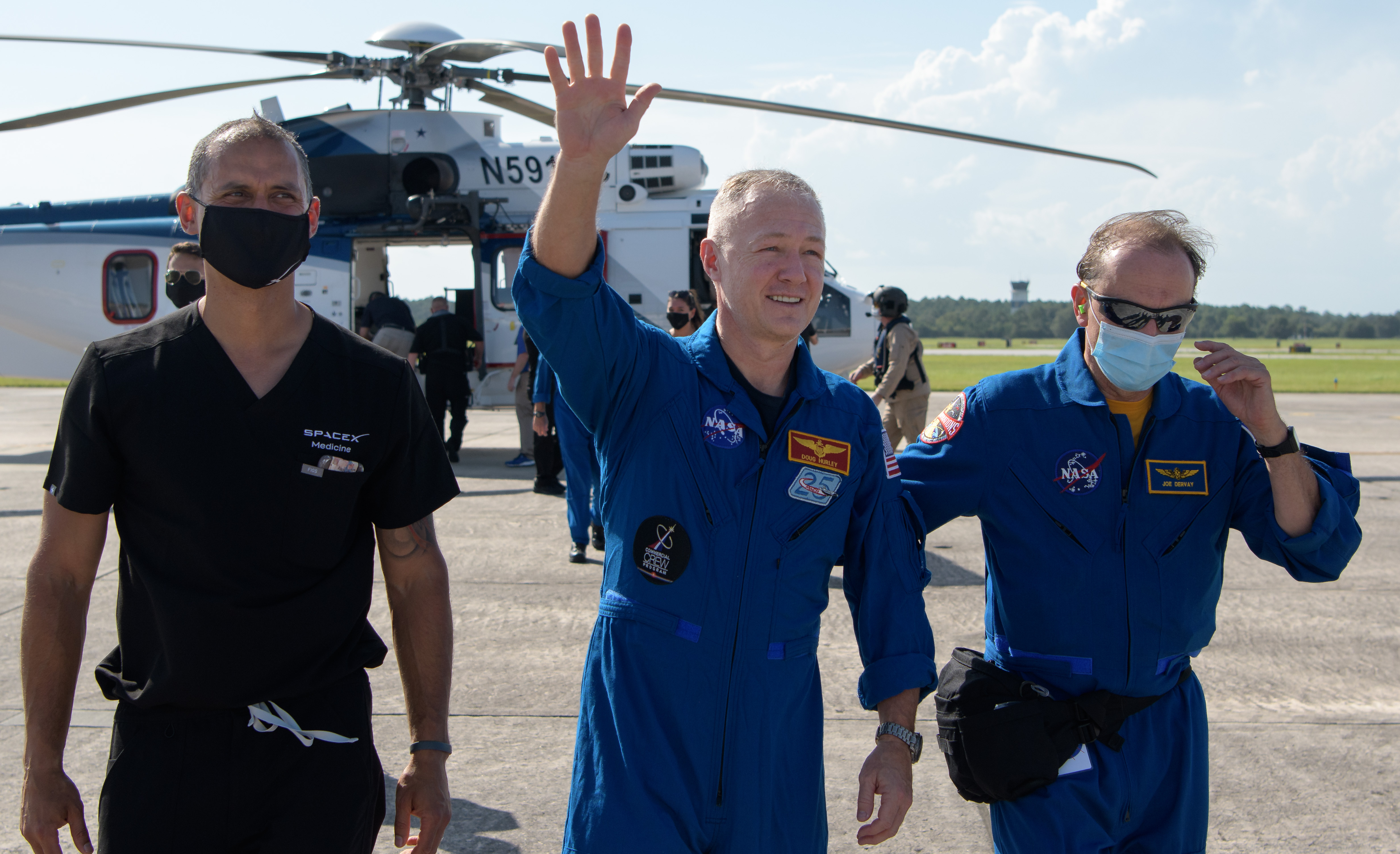
Menon (left) with astronaut Doug Hurley after SpaceX Demo-2 recovery

Anil Menon joined SpaceX in April 2018 as its first flight surgeon. He was present at four Crew Dragon missions from SpaceX Demo-2 through Inspiration4, especially at the times of recovery and crew suit-up. In this way, he helped to launch the company's first humans to space during NASA's SpaceX Demo-2 mission, as well as the first civilians on the Inspiration4 mission and building a medical organization to support the human system during future missions such as Starship. After being accepted as an astronaut candidate, he left SpaceX in December 2021.

== NASA astronaut career ==
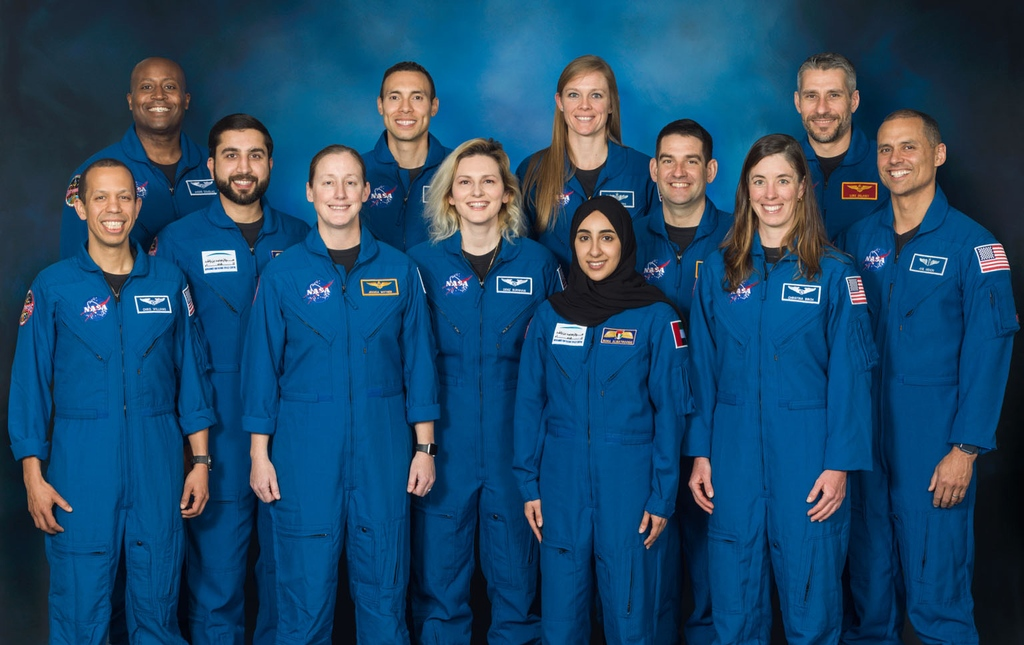
NASA Astronaut Group 23

In December 2021, Menon was selected as a NASA astronaut. Menon reported for duty in January 2022 and completed two years of initial astronaut training as a NASA astronaut candidate on March 5, 2024.

Since completion of initial astronaut training, Menon could be assigned to missions that involve performing research aboard the International Space Station as well as deep space missions to destinations including the Moon on NASA's Orion spacecraft and Space Launch System rocket.

Menon flew on Soyuz MS-29, which launched in July 2026 to the International Space Station, becoming a flight engineer as part of Expedition 74/75.

== Personal life ==
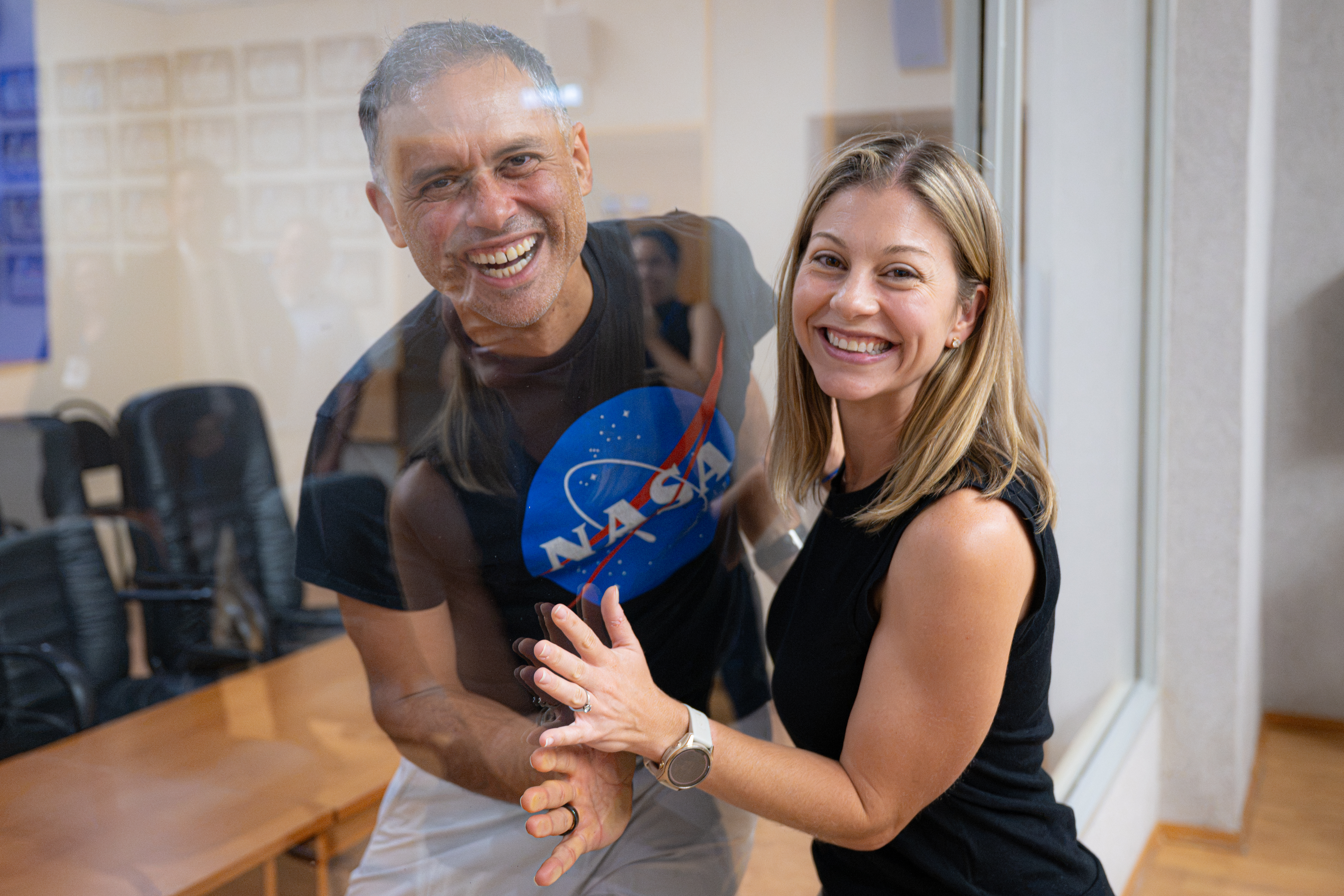
Anil Menon and his wife Anna at the Cosmonaut Hotel in Baikonur, Kazakhstan, for his Soyuz MS-29 preflight preparations

He is married to Anna Menon, who is a NASA astronaut candidate from Astronaut Group 24, former Lead Space Operations Engineer at SpaceX and a spaceflight crew member of Polaris Dawn as part of Jared Isaacman's Polaris program. They have two children. Both he and his wife appeared in the final episode of the five-episode television documentary entitled Countdown: Inspiration4 Mission to Space, released on Netflix in September 2021.
