= Polaris program =

Private crewed spaceflight program

Polaris

Program overview
- Country: United States
- Organization: SpaceX
- Status: Abandoned

Program history
- Duration: 2022–2025
- Launch site: Kennedy, LC‑39A

Vehicle information
- Crewed vehicles: Crew Dragon; Starship
- Launch vehicles: Falcon 9; SpaceX Starship

The Polaris program was a private spaceflight program organized by entrepreneur Jared Isaacman. Building on his experience as commander of the Inspiration4 mission—the first all-civilian spaceflight—Isaacman contracted with SpaceX to establish Polaris. The program flew the Polaris Dawn mission using SpaceX's Crew Dragon spacecraft in 2024, featuring the first commercial spacewalk, and was originally planned to culminate in the first crewed launch on Starship. After being nominated to be Administrator of NASA, Isaacman cancelled his contract with SpaceX for the additional missions, to remove a potential conflict of interest with one of the agency's biggest contractors.

== Flights ==
Mission name	Launch date (UTC)	Launch vehicle	Spacecraft	Orbit	Crew	Outcome
Polaris Dawn (Mission I)	10 September 2024, 09:23:49	Falcon 9 Block 5	Crew Dragon (C207.3 Resilience)	LEO, 1,400 km (870 mi) max apogee.	(United States) Jared Isaacman; (United States) Scott Poteet; (United States) Sarah Gillis; (United States) Anna Menon	Success
Mission II	cancelled	Falcon 9 Block 5	Crew Dragon	TBA	(United States) Jared Isaacman; others TBA	Cancelled
Mission III	cancelled	Starship	Starship	TBA	(United States) Jared Isaacman; others TBA	Cancelled

=== Polaris Dawn ===
On 10 September 2024, The Polaris Dawn mission propelled Isaacman and his crew of three—Scott Poteet, Sarah Gillis, and Anna Menon—to an elliptical orbit 1,400 kilometres (870 mi) away from Earth. This was the furthest anyone had been from Earth since NASA's Apollo program. They passed through parts of the Van Allen radiation belt to study the health effects of space radiation and spaceflight on the human body. Later in the mission, with a lower apogee, Isaacman and Gillis successfully completed the first commercial spacewalk and tested the mobility and functionality of SpaceX's EVA spacesuit.

=== Mission II ===
The second mission in the Polaris Program was planned to launch via a Falcon 9 Block 5 vehicle with a Crew Dragon 2 capsule. SpaceX and Polaris had studied a crewed mission to lift the Hubble Space Telescope into a higher orbit to prevent it from burning up in the atmosphere, but this option was rejected by NASA in June 2024.

=== Mission III ===
The third Polaris mission was set to be the first crewed launch on Starship, SpaceX's next-generation launch system. No specific plans were known at the time the program was cancelled.

== See also ==
- Timeline of private spaceflight
