= Kikin Hall =

Building in Saint Petersburg, Russia

Coordinates: 59°56′58.88″N 30°23′12.12″E

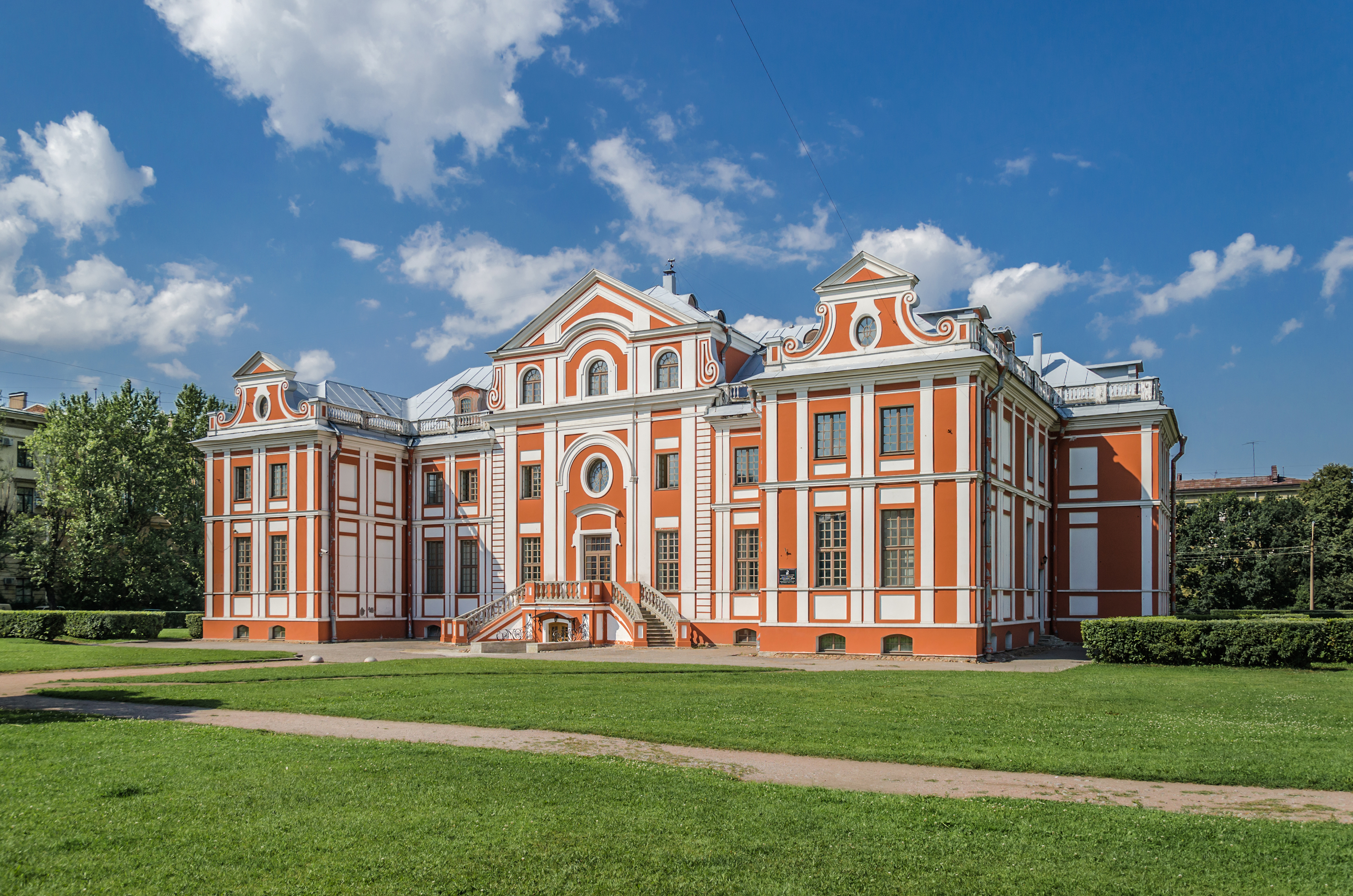
Kikin Hall

The Kikin Hall (Кикины палаты) is one of the oldest buildings in Saint Petersburg, Russia. The diminutive residence was commissioned by Alexander Kikin in 1714. The name of the architect is unknown, but similarities to the old Peterhof palace abound, suggesting an attribution to Andreas Schlüter.

The palace was incomplete at the time of Alexander Kikin's disgrace and execution in 1718. The building was confiscated by the crown and used to house the royal library and the cabinet of curiosities of the Academy of Sciences (later transferred to the Kunstkamera building). The original two-storey residence was expanded and the third storey was added at some point in the 1720s.

After 1733 the building was occupied by the office of the Horse Guards and their hospital. It was completely remodeled in 1829, and its Baroque decor was removed. The dilapidated building was further damaged by aerial bombs in the 1940s.
