= Alexander Kikin =

Russian noble (ca. 1670–1718)

Alexander Vasilievich Kikin (Russian: Александр Васильевич Кикин; ca. 1670–1718) was a political mentor and advisor to Alexei Petrovich, Tsarevich of Russia; accused of having arranged the flight abroad of the latter, Kikin was broken on the wheel.

Kikin began his career as a bombardier in the toy army of Peter I. He accompanied the monarch in the Great Embassy and learned the mast-maker's craft in the Netherlands. Upon returning to Russia, Kikin helped build the first Russian warships in Voronezh and Olonets. In the January campaign of 1706 he had Mitau Castle blown up and retreated with his regiment toward Minsk. In 1707 Kikin was put in charge of the Admiralty Shipyard. He was a groomsman at Peter's second wedding.

Kikin's old rivalry with Alexander Menshikov put him in a precarious position, however. In 1715 he was arrested on suspicion of graft and was forced to leave the capital for Moscow. A year later Peter relented, allowing him to return to the court. In 1718 Kikin was implicated in the conspiracy of Tsarevich Alexei, tortured and executed. Among other things he was accused of trying to kill the monarch when he had been asleep. He had apparently visited Vienna in order to persuade Emperor Charles VI to shelter the heir apparent.

Kikin's properties, including the unfinished Baroque residence in the vicinity of the Smolny Convent, were confiscated by the Tsar. The much restored Kikin Palace is one of the oldest buildings in the city.
