= 2015 in spaceflight =

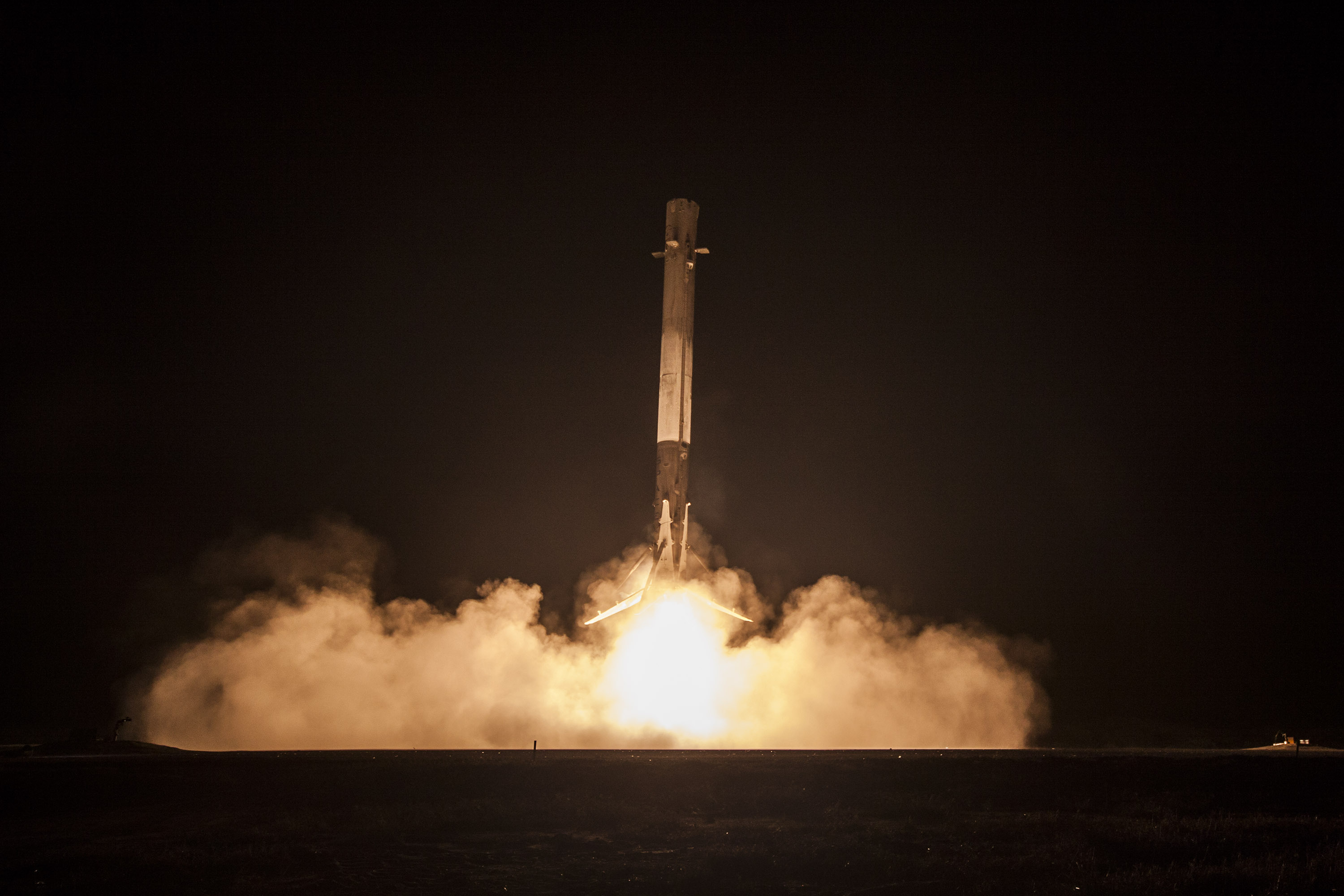
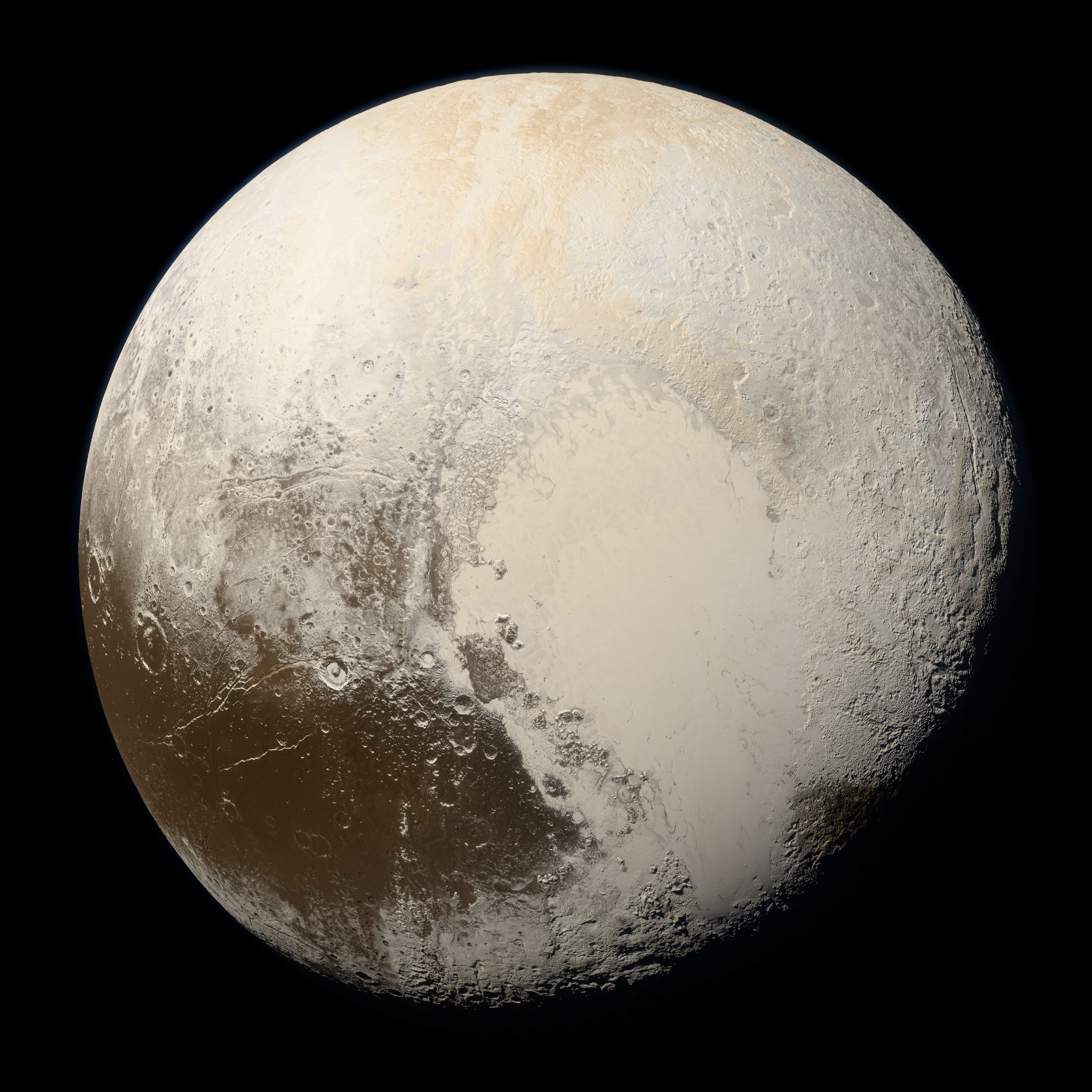
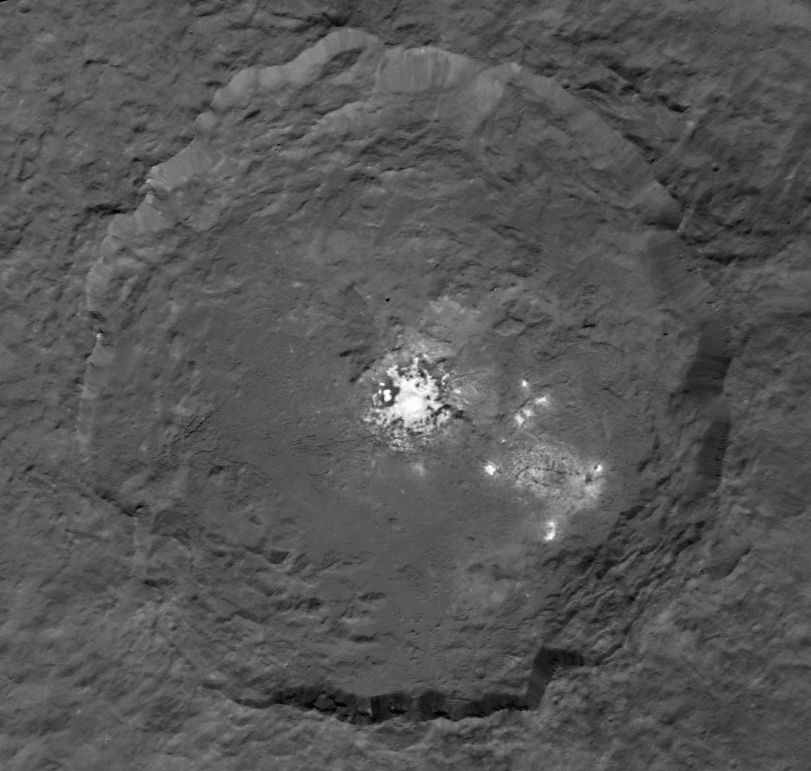
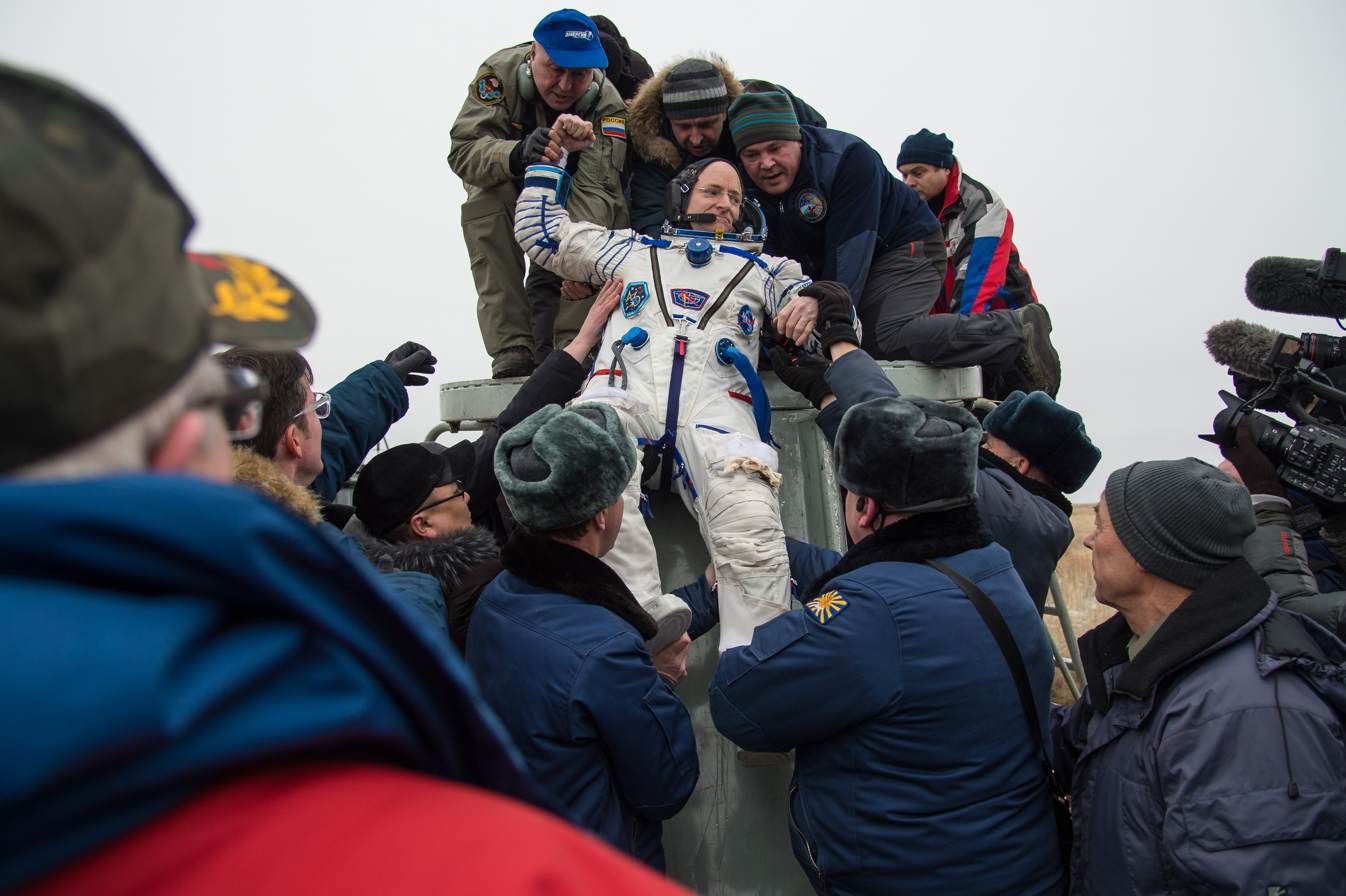
- Highlights from spaceflight in 2015 (Note: Clockwise from top: The first ever vertical landing of an orbital-class launch vehicle, during the Falcon 9's twentieth flight in December. The vehicle landed at Cape Canaveral LZ-1.; A close-up view of one of many high albedo regions on the dwarf planet Ceres spotted by the Dawn spacecraft upon its arrival in March. Ceres was the second world to be visited by Dawn after the main belt asteroid 4 Vesta.; Commander Scott Kelly is pulled from the Soyuz TMA-M Eridan following its landing in Kazakhstan in March. The landing signalled the conclusion of Kelly's and Mikhail Kornienko's year in space.; A true colour view of Pluto, photographed by the New Horizons spacecraft during its historic flyby in July. Launched in 2006, the spacecraft traversed a distance of nearly 5 billion kilometres (3.1 billion miles) before performing the first ever reconnaissance of a Kuiper belt object (KBO).)

Orbital launches
- First: 10 January
- Last: 28 December
- Total: 87
- Successes: 82
- Failures: 4
- Partial failures: 1
- Catalogued: 83 (Note: The European experimental spaceplane IXV was briefly in orbit but did not receive a COSPAR catalog number.)

National firsts
- Satellite: Turkmenistan; Laos
- Space traveller: Denmark; Kazakhstan

Rockets
- Maiden flights: Long March 3C/E / YZ-1; Long March 3B / YZ-1; Long March 6; Long March 11; Super Strypi; Falcon 9 Full Thrust
- Retirements: Dnepr-1

Crewed flights
- Orbital: 4
- Total travellers: 12
- EVAs: 7

2015 in spaceflight

In 2015, the maiden spaceflights of the Chinese Long March 6 and Long March 11 launch vehicles took place.

A total of 87 orbital launches were attempted in 2015, of which 82 were successful, one was partially successful and four were failures. The year also saw seven EVAs by ISS astronauts. The majority of the year's orbital launches were conducted by Russia, the United States and China, with 27, 20 and 19 launches respectively.

== Overview ==
In February 2015, the European Space Agency's experimental lifting body spacecraft, the Intermediate eXperimental Vehicle, successfully conducted its first test flight.

In March 2015, Ceres became the first dwarf planet to be visited by a spacecraft when Dawn entered orbit. In July 2015, New Horizons visited the Pluto-Charon system after a 9-year voyage, returning a trove of pictures and information about the former "ninth planet" (now classified as a dwarf planet). Meanwhile, the MESSENGER probe was deliberately crashed into Mercury after 4 years of in-orbit observations.

On 23 November 2015, the Blue Origin New Shepard suborbital rocket achieved its first powered soft landing near the launch site, paving the way for full reuse of its propulsion stage. On 21 December, the maiden flight of the SpaceX Falcon 9 Full Thrust took place, ending with a successful landing of its first stage.

Two old weather satellites, NOAA-16 and DMSP 5D-2/F13, broke up in 2015, creating several hundred pieces of space debris. In both cases, a battery explosion is suspected as the root cause.

== Orbital launches ==
- ← Jan
- Feb
- Mar
- Apr
- May
- Jun
- Jul
- Aug
- Sep
- Oct
- Nov
- Dec →

Date and time (UTC)	Rocket	Flight number	Launch site		LSP	
Date and time (UTC)	Payload (⚀ = CubeSat)	Operator	Orbit	Function	Decay (UTC)	Outcome
Date and time (UTC)	Remarks					
=== January ===
10 January; 09:47:10	(United States) Falcon 9 v1.1		(United States) Cape Canaveral SLC-40		(United States) SpaceX	
10 January; 09:47:10	(United States) SpaceX CRS-5	NASA	Low Earth (ISS)	ISS resupply	11 February 2015; 00:44	Successful
10 January; 09:47:10	⚀ (Brazil) AESP-14	ITA	Low Earth	Ionospheric research	11 May 2015	Successful
10 January; 09:47:10	⚀ (United States) Flock-1d' 1	Planet Labs	Low Earth	Earth observation	13 October 2015	Successful
10 January; 09:47:10	⚀ (United States) Flock-1d' 2	Planet Labs	Low Earth	Earth observation	27 December 2015	Successful
10 January; 09:47:10	SpaceX attempted to land the first stage on a platform in the Atlantic Ocean, but the first stage crash-landed on its landing platform. The AESP-14 CubeSat was deployed from the space station on 5 February 2015, while the Flock-1 CubeSats were deployed on 3 March 2015.					
21 January; 01:04:00	(United States) Atlas V 551		(United States) Cape Canaveral SLC-41		(United States) United Launch Alliance	
21 January; 01:04:00	(United States) MUOS-3	US Navy	Geosynchronous	Communications	In orbit	Operational
31 January; 14:22:00	(United States) Delta II 7320		(United States) Vandenberg SLC-2W		(United States) United Launch Alliance	
31 January; 14:22:00	(United States) SMAP	NASA	Low Earth (SSO)	Earth observation	In orbit	Operational
31 January; 14:22:00	⚀ (United States) ExoCube	Cal Poly	Low Earth (SSO)	Technology demonstration	In orbit	Operational
31 January; 14:22:00	⚀ (United States) FIREBIRD II A	Montana State	Low Earth (SSO)	Technology demonstration	2 August 2023	Successful
31 January; 14:22:00	⚀ (United States) FIREBIRD II B	Montana State	Low Earth (SSO)	Technology demonstration	2 August 2023	Successful
31 January; 14:22:00	⚀ (United States) GRIFEX	NASA / JPL	Low Earth (SSO)	Technology demonstration	In orbit	Operational
← Jan; Feb; Mar; Apr; May; Jun; Jul; Aug; Sep; Oct; Nov; Dec →; === February ===
1 February; 01:21:00	(Japan) H-IIA 202		(Japan) Tanegashima LA-Y1		(Japan) MHI	
1 February; 01:21:00	(Japan) IGS-Radar Spare	CSICE	Low Earth (SSO)	Reconnaissance	In orbit	Successful
1 February; 12:31:00	(Russia) Proton-M/Briz-M		(Kazakhstan) Baikonur Site 200/39		(Russia) (United States) International Launch Services	
1 February; 12:31:00	(United Kingdom) Inmarsat 5-F2	Inmarsat	Geosynchronous	Communications	In orbit	Operational
2 February; 08:50	(Iran) Safir-1B	LBS.2001	(Iran) Semnan		(Iran) ISA	
2 February; 08:50	(Iran) Fajr	ISA	Low Earth	Technology demonstration	26 February 2015	Successful
11 February; 13:40:00	(Italy) Vega		(France) Kourou ELV		(France) Arianespace	
11 February; 13:40:00	IXV	ESA	Transatmospheric	Technology demonstration	11 February 2015; 15:19	Successful
11 February; 13:40:00	Vega's 4th stage briefly entered low Earth orbit before de-orbiting; thus it did not get a COSPAR ID. This marked the first flight of the IXV					
11 February; 23:03:32	(United States) Falcon 9 v1.1		(United States) Cape Canaveral SLC-40		(United States) SpaceX	
11 February; 23:03:32	(United States) DSCOVR	NOAA	Sun–Earth L_{1}	Earth observation / Heliophysics	In orbit	Operational
11 February; 23:03:32	First SpaceX launch aimed beyond GTO. First stage soft landed on water.					
17 February; 11:00:17	(Russia) Soyuz-U		(Kazakhstan) Baikonur Site 1/5		(Russia) Roscosmos	
17 February; 11:00:17	(Russia) Progress M-26M / 58P	Roscosmos	Low Earth (ISS)	ISS resupply	14 August 2015; 14:17	Successful
27 February; 11:01:35	(Russia) Soyuz-2.1a		(Russia) Plesetsk Site 43/4		(Russia) RVSN RF	
27 February; 11:01:35	(Russia) Kosmos 2503 (Bars-M 1L)	VKO	Low Earth (SSO)	Reconnaissance	In orbit	Operational
← Jan; Feb; Mar; Apr; May; Jun; Jul; Aug; Sep; Oct; Nov; Dec →; === March ===
2 March; 03:50:00	(United States) Falcon 9 v1.1		(United States) Cape Canaveral SLC-40		(United States) SpaceX	
2 March; 03:50:00	(France) Eutelsat 115 West B	Eutelsat	Geosynchronous	Communications	In orbit	Operational
2 March; 03:50:00	(Bermuda) ABS-3A	ABS	Geosynchronous	Communications	In orbit	Operational
2 March; 03:50:00	First communication satellites to use all-electric propulsion to reach intended orbits from GTO.					
13 March; 02:44:00	(United States) Atlas V 421		(United States) Cape Canaveral SLC-41		(United States) United Launch Alliance	
13 March; 02:44:00	(United States) MMS-1	NASA	Elliptical High Earth	Magnetospheric research	In orbit	Operational
13 March; 02:44:00	(United States) MMS-2	NASA	Elliptical High Earth	Magnetospheric research	In orbit	Operational
13 March; 02:44:00	(United States) MMS-3	NASA	Elliptical High Earth	Magnetospheric research	In orbit	Operational
13 March; 02:44:00	(United States) MMS-4	NASA	Elliptical High Earth	Magnetospheric research	In orbit	Operational
18 March; 22:05:00	(Russia) Proton-M / Briz-M		(Kazakhstan) Baikonur Site 200/39		(Russia) Khrunichev	
18 March; 22:05:00	(Russia) Ekspress AM7	RSCC	Geosynchronous	Communications	In orbit	Operational
25 March; 18:36:00	(United States) Delta IV M+(4,2)		(United States) Cape Canaveral SLC-37B		(United States) United Launch Alliance	
25 March; 18:36:00	(United States) USA-260 (GPS IIF-9)	US Air Force	Medium Earth	Navigation	In orbit	Operational
25 March; 18:36:00	Named after Star Deneb.					
25 March; 22:08:53	(Ukraine) Dnepr		(Russia) Dombarovsky Site 13		(Russia) (Ukraine) ISC Kosmotras	
25 March; 22:08:53	(South Korea) KOMPSat-3A	KARI	Low Earth (SSO)	Earth observation	In orbit	Operational
25 March; 22:08:53	Final flight of Dnepr-1 rocket, due to the Russo-Ukrainian war.					
26 March; 01:21:00	(Japan) H-IIA 202		(Japan) Tanegashima LA-Y1		(Japan) MHI	
26 March; 01:21:00	(Japan) IGS-Optical 5	CSICE	Low Earth (SSO)	Reconnaissance	In orbit	Operational
27 March; 19:42:57	(Russia) Soyuz-FG		(Kazakhstan) Baikonur Site 1/5		(Russia) Roscosmos	
27 March; 19:42:57	(Russia) Soyuz TMA-16M	Roscosmos	Low Earth (ISS)	Expedition 43/44/45/46	12 September 2015; 00:51	Successful
27 March; 19:42:57	Crewed flight with three cosmonauts, including two on a year-long mission.					
27 March; 21:46:18	(Russia) Soyuz-STB / Fregat		(France) Kourou ELS		(France) Arianespace	
27 March; 21:46:18	Galileo FOC 3	ESA	Medium Earth	Navigation	In orbit	Operational
27 March; 21:46:18	Galileo FOC 4	ESA	Medium Earth	Navigation	In orbit	Operational
28 March; 11:49:00	(India) PSLV-XL		(India) Satish Dhawan SLP		(India) ISRO	
28 March; 11:49:00	(India) IRNSS-1D	ISRO	Geosynchronous	Navigation	In orbit	Operational
30 March; 13:52:30	(China) Long March 3C/E/YZ-1		(China) Xichang LC-2		(China) CASC	
30 March; 13:52:30	(China) BeiDou I1-S	CNSA	Geosynchronous	Navigation	In orbit	Operational
31 March; 13:47:56	(Russia) Rokot / Briz-KM		(Russia) Plesetsk Cosmodrome Site 133/3		(Russia) VKO	
31 March; 13:47:56	(Russia) Gonets-M 11	Gonets Satellite System	Low Earth	Communications	In orbit	Operational
31 March; 13:47:56	(Russia) Gonets-M 12	Gonets Satellite System	Low Earth	Communications	In orbit	Operational
31 March; 13:47:56	(Russia) Gonets-M 13	Gonets Satellite System	Low Earth	Communications	In orbit	Operational
31 March; 13:47:56	(Russia) Kosmos 2504	VKO	Low Earth	Technology demonstration / Satellite inspection (?)	In orbit	Operational
← Jan; Feb; Mar; Apr; May; Jun; Jul; Aug; Sep; Oct; Nov; Dec →; === April ===
14 April; 20:10:41	(United States) Falcon 9 v1.1		(United States) Cape Canaveral SLC-40		(United States) SpaceX	
14 April; 20:10:41	(United States) SpaceX CRS-6	NASA	Low Earth (ISS)	ISS resupply	21 May 2015; 16:42	Successful
14 April; 20:10:41	(United States) Arkyd 3 Reflight	Planetary Resources	Low Earth	Technology demonstration	23 December 2015	Successful
14 April; 20:10:41	⚀ (United States) Flock-1e × 14	Planet Labs	Low Earth	Earth observation	First: 8 February 2016; Last: 24 August 2016	Successful
14 April; 20:10:41	First stage recovery failed; the rocket stage landed on the target drone ship too fast, tipped over, and exploded. All secondary payloads were deployed from an ISS airlock later. Arkyd 3 Reflight is a replacement for Arkyd 3, which was lost in the Cygnus CRS Orb-3 flight accident in 2014.					
26 April; 20:00:07	(France) Ariane 5 ECA		(France) Kourou ELA-3		(France) Arianespace	
26 April; 20:00:07	(Norway) Thor 7	Telenor	Geosynchronous	Communications	In orbit	Operational
26 April; 20:00:07	(Italy) (France) SICRAL-2	MDD/DGA	Geosynchronous	Communications	In orbit	Operational
27 April; 23:03:00	(United States) Falcon 9 v1.1		(United States) Cape Canaveral SLC-40		(United States) SpaceX	
27 April; 23:03:00	(Turkmenistan) TürkmenÄlem 52°E / MonacoSAT	Turkmen Telecom	Geosynchronous	Communications	In orbit	Operational
27 April; 23:03:00	First Turkmen satellite (not counting Turkmenistan Memorial Capsule).					
28 April; 07:09:50	(Russia) Soyuz-2.1a		(Kazakhstan) Baikonur Site 31/6		(Russia) Roscosmos	
28 April; 07:09:50	(Russia) Progress M-27M / 59P	Roscosmos	Low Earth (ISS)	ISS resupply	8 May 2015	Failure
28 April; 07:09:50	Spacecraft lost communications and attitude control soon after separation failure during launch. International Space Station docking attempt cancelled. Mission declared a total loss.					
← Jan; Feb; Mar; Apr; May; Jun; Jul; Aug; Sep; Oct; Nov; Dec →; === May ===
16 May; 05:47:39	(Russia) Proton-M / Briz-M		(Kazakhstan) Baikonur Site 200/39		(Russia) (United States) International Launch Services	
16 May; 05:47:39	(Mexico) Mexsat-1	SCT	Geosynchronous	Communications	16 May 2015	Launch failure
16 May; 05:47:39	Proton third stage vernier engine failed at T+497 seconds due to turbopump shaft coating degradation causing excess vibration.					
20 May; 15:05:00	(United States) Atlas V 501		(United States) Cape Canaveral SLC-41		(United States) United Launch Alliance	
20 May; 15:05:00	(United States) AFSPC-5 (X-37B OTV-4)	U.S. Air Force	Low Earth	Technology demonstration	7 May 2017	Operational
20 May; 15:05:00	(United States) ULTRASat	NASA	Low Earth	CubeSat Deployment	In orbit	Operational
20 May; 15:05:00	⚀ (United States) LightSail 1	The Planetary Society	Low Earth	Technology demonstration	14 June 2015; 17:23	Successful
20 May; 15:05:00	⚀ (United States) USS Langley	U.S. Naval Academy	Low Earth	Technology demonstration	In orbit	Operational
20 May; 15:05:00	⚀ (United States) BRICSat-P	U.S. Naval Academy / George Washington	Low Earth	Technology demonstration	In orbit	Operational
20 May; 15:05:00	⚀ (United States) ParkinsonSat	U.S. Naval Academy	Low Earth	Technology demonstration	In orbit	Operational
20 May; 15:05:00	⚀ (United States) GEARRS-2	Taylor	Low Earth	Technology demonstration	In orbit	Operational
20 May; 15:05:00	⚀ (United States) AeroCube-8A	The Aerospace Corporation	Low Earth	Technology demonstration	11 October 2021	Successful
20 May; 15:05:00	⚀ (United States) AeroCube-8B	The Aerospace Corporation	Low Earth	Technology demonstration	2 October 2021	Successful
20 May; 15:05:00	⚀ (United States) OptiCube 1	CalPoly	Low Earth	Technology demonstration	In orbit	Operational
20 May; 15:05:00	⚀ (United States) OptiCube 2	CalPoly	Low Earth	Technology demonstration	In orbit	Operational
20 May; 15:05:00	⚀ (United States) OptiCube 3	CalPoly	Low Earth	Technology demonstration	In orbit	Operational
20 May; 15:05:00	The X-37B spaceplane landed autonomously at Kennedy Space Center's Shuttle Landing Facility after spending a record-breaking 718 days in orbit.					
27 May; 21:16:07	(France) Ariane 5 ECA		(France) Kourou ELA-3		(France) Arianespace	
27 May; 21:16:07	(United States) DirecTV-15	DirecTV	Geosynchronous	Communications	In orbit	Operational
27 May; 21:16:07	Sky Mexico 1	SKY Mexico	Geosynchronous	Communications	In orbit	Operational
← Jan; Feb; Mar; Apr; May; Jun; Jul; Aug; Sep; Oct; Nov; Dec →; === June ===
5 June; 15:23:54	(Russia) Soyuz-2.1a		(Russia) Plesetsk Site 43/4		(Russia) RVSN RF	
5 June; 15:23:54	(Russia) Kosmos 2505 (Kobalt-M №10)	VKO	Low Earth	Reconnaissance	18 September 2015	Successful
23 June; 01:51:58	(Italy) Vega		(France) Kourou ELV		(France) Arianespace	
23 June; 01:51:58	Sentinel-2A	ESA	Low Earth (SSO)	Earth observation	In orbit	Operational
23 June; 16:44:00	(Russia) Soyuz-2.1b		(Russia) Plesetsk Site 43/4		(Russia) RVSN RF	
23 June; 16:44:00	(Russia) Kosmos 2506 (Persona №3)	VKO	Low Earth (SSO)	Reconnaissance	In orbit	Operational
26 June; 06:22:04	(China) Long March 4B		(China) Taiyuan LC-9		(China) CASC	
26 June; 06:22:04	(China) Gaofen 8	CNSA	Low Earth (SSO)	Earth observation / Reconnaissance	In orbit	Operational
28 June; 14:21:11	(United States) Falcon 9 v1.1		(United States) Cape Canaveral SLC-40		(United States) SpaceX	
28 June; 14:21:11	(United States) SpaceX CRS-7	NASA	Low Earth (ISS)	ISS resupply	28 June 2015	Launch Failure
28 June; 14:21:11	⚀ (United States) Flock-1f × 8	Planet Labs	Low Earth	Earth observation	28 June 2015	Launch Failure
28 June; 14:21:11	Vehicle disintegrated at T+139 seconds after second stage helium tank support strut failure caused helium tank to break through second stage tanks. Attempted to deliver the IDA-1 segment of the NASA Docking System. CubeSats were to be deployed from the International Space Station at a later date. Planned first stage landing test not achieved.					
← Jan; Feb; Mar; Apr; May; Jun; Jul; Aug; Sep; Oct; Nov; Dec →; === July ===
3 July; 04:55:48	(Russia) Soyuz-U		(Kazakhstan) Baikonur Site 1/5		(Russia) Roscosmos	
3 July; 04:55:48	(Russia) Progress M-28M / 60P	Roscosmos	Low Earth (ISS)	ISS resupply	19 December 2015	Successful
10 July; 16:28:00	(India) PSLV-XL		(India) Satish Dhawan FLP		(India) ISRO	
10 July; 16:28:00	(United Kingdom) UK-DMC-3A	DMCii	Low Earth (SSO)	Earth observation	In orbit	Operational
10 July; 16:28:00	(United Kingdom) UK-DMC-3B	DMCii	Low Earth (SSO)	Earth observation	In orbit	Operational
10 July; 16:28:00	(United Kingdom) UK-DMC-3C	DMCii	Low Earth (SSO)	Earth observation	In orbit	Operational
10 July; 16:28:00	(United Kingdom) CBNT-1	SSTL	Low Earth (SSO)	Technology demonstration	In orbit	Operational
10 July; 16:28:00	⚀ (United Kingdom) DeOrbitSail	Surrey Space Centre	Low Earth (SSO)	Technology demonstration	In orbit	Operational
15 July; 15:36:00	(United States) Atlas V 401		(United States) Cape Canaveral SLC-41		(United States) United Launch Alliance	
15 July; 15:36:00	(United States) USA-262 (GPS IIF-10)	U.S. Air Force	Medium Earth	Navigation	In orbit	Operational
15 July; 15:36:00	Named after Star Antares.					
15 July; 21:42:07	(France) Ariane 5 ECA		(France) Kourou ELA-3		(France) Arianespace	
15 July; 21:42:07	(Brazil) Star One C4	Star One	Geosynchronous	Communications	In orbit	Operational
15 July; 21:42:07	MSG-4	EUMETSAT	Geosynchronous	Meteorology	In orbit	Operational
22 July; 21:02:44	(Russia) Soyuz-FG		(Kazakhstan) Baikonur Site 1/5		(Russia) Roscosmos	
22 July; 21:02:44	(Russia) Soyuz TMA-17M	Roscosmos	Low Earth (ISS)	Expedition 44/45	11 December 2015; 13:10	Successful
22 July; 21:02:44	Crewed flight with three cosmonauts.					
24 July; 00:07:00	(United States) Delta IV M+(5,4)		(United States) Cape Canaveral SLC-37B		(United States) United Launch Alliance	
24 July; 00:07:00	(United States) USA-263 (WGS-7)	U.S. Air Force	Geosynchronous	Communications	In orbit	Operational
25 July; 12:29:04	(China) Long March 3B/YZ-1		(China) Xichang LA-2		(China) CASC	
25 July; 12:29:04	(China) BeiDou M1-S	CNSA	Medium Earth	Navigation	In orbit	Operational
25 July; 12:29:04	(China) BeiDou M2-S	CNSA	Medium Earth	Navigation	In orbit	Operational
← Jan; Feb; Mar; Apr; May; Jun; Jul; Aug; Sep; Oct; Nov; Dec →; === August ===
19 August; 11:50:49	(Japan) H-IIB		(Japan) Tanegashima LA-Y2		(Japan) MHI	
19 August; 11:50:49	(Japan) HTV-5	JAXA	Low Earth (ISS)	ISS resupply	29 September 2015	Successful
19 August; 11:50:49	⚀ (Denmark) AAUSAT5	Aalborg	Low Earth	Technology demonstration	15 March 2016	Successful
19 August; 11:50:49	⚀ (United States) Flock-2b × 14	Planet Labs	Low Earth	Earth observation	First: 22 May 2016; Last: 17 October 2016	Successful (12 deployed)
19 August; 11:50:49	⚀ (Denmark) GOMX-3	GomSpace	Low Earth	Technology demonstration	19 October 2016	Successful
19 August; 11:50:49	⚀ (Japan) S-CUBE	Chiba Institute of Technology	Low Earth	Meteor observation	23 November 2016	
19 August; 11:50:49	⚀ (Brazil) SERPENS	University of Brasília / Brazilian Space Agency	Low Earth	Technology demonstration	27 March 2016	Successful
19 August; 11:50:49	CubeSats to be deployed from the International Space Station at a later date. SERPENS and S-CUBE were deployed on 17 September. AAUSAT5, GOMX-3, and Dove Flocks were deployed on 5–7 October, but two out of the fourteen Dove Flocks failed to be deployed due to a malfunction of the deployer.					
20 August; 20:34:08	(France) Ariane 5 ECA		(France) Kourou ELA-3		(France) Arianespace	
20 August; 20:34:08	(France) Eutelsat 8 West B	Eutelsat	Geosynchronous	Communications	In orbit	Operational
20 August; 20:34:08	(United States) Intelsat 34	Intelsat	Geosynchronous	Communications	In orbit	Operational
27 August; 02:31:35	(China) Long March 4C		(China) Taiyuan LC-9		(China) CASC	
27 August; 02:31:35	(China) Yaogan 27	CNSA	Low Earth (SSO)	Reconnaissance	In orbit	Operational
27 August; 11:22:00	(India) GSLV Mk II		(India) Satish Dhawan SLP		(India) ISRO	
27 August; 11:22:00	(India) GSAT-6	Indian Armed Forces/ISRO	Geosynchronous	Communications	In orbit	Operational
28 August; 11:44:00	(Russia) Proton-M / Briz-M		(Kazakhstan) Baikonur Site 200/39		(Russia) (United States) International Launch Services	
28 August; 11:44:00	(United Kingdom) Inmarsat 5-F3	Inmarsat	Geosynchronous	Communications	In orbit	Operational
← Jan; Feb; Mar; Apr; May; Jun; Jul; Aug; Sep; Oct; Nov; Dec →; === September ===
2 September; 04:37:43	(Russia) Soyuz-FG		(Kazakhstan) Baikonur Site 1/5		(Russia) Roscosmos	
2 September; 04:37:43	(Russia) Soyuz TMA-18M	Roscosmos	Low Earth (ISS)	Expedition 45/46/iriss	2 March 2016; 04:26	Successful
2 September; 04:37:43	Crewed flight with three cosmonauts: including ESA astronaut Andreas Mogensen, the first Dane in space, and Aidyn Aimbetov, the first cosmonaut from an independent Kazakhstan. Sarah Brightman was intended to fly this mission as a spaceflight participant, but withdrew from training on 13 May 2015 for personal reasons. Japanese space tourist Satoshi Takamatsu was believed to be taking Brightman's place, but he declined and Roscosmos chose Aimbetov as an alternative instead. Landed with the Year in Space crew of Scott Kelly and Mikhail Korniyenko					
2 September; 10:18:00	(United States) Atlas V 551		(United States) Cape Canaveral SLC-41		(United States) United Launch Alliance	
2 September; 10:18:00	(United States) MUOS-4	U.S. Navy	Geosynchronous	Communications	In orbit	Operational
11 September; 02:08:10	(Russia) Soyuz-STB / Fregat		(France) Kourou ELS		(France) Arianespace	
11 September; 02:08:10	Galileo FOC 5	ESA	Medium Earth	Navigation	In orbit	Operational
11 September; 02:08:10	Galileo FOC 6	ESA	Medium Earth	Navigation	In orbit	Operational
12 September; 15:42:04	(China) Long March 3B/E		(China) Xichang LC-2		(China) CASC	
12 September; 15:42:04	(China) TJS-1	CNSA	Geosynchronous	Communications	In orbit	Operational
14 September; 04:42	(China) Long March 2D		(China) Jiuquan SLS-2		(China) CASC	
14 September; 04:42	(China) Gaofen 9	CNSA	Low Earth (SSO)	Earth observation / Reconnaissance	In orbit	Operational
14 September; 19:00:00	(Russia) Proton-M / Blok DM-03		(Kazakhstan) Baikonur Site 81/24		(Russia) Khrunichev	
14 September; 19:00:00	(Russia) Ekspress AM8	RSCC	Geosynchronous	Communications	In orbit	Operational
19 September; 23:01:14	(China) Long March 6		(China) Taiyuan LC-16		(China) CASC	
19 September; 23:01:14	(China) LilacSat-2	HIT	Low Earth (SSO)	Technology demonstration	In orbit	Operational
19 September; 23:01:14	(China) NS-2	Tsinghua University	Low Earth (SSO)	Technology demonstration	In orbit	Operational
19 September; 23:01:14	(China) NUDT-PhoneSat	NUDT	Low Earth (SSO)	Technology demonstration	29 March 2023	Successful
19 September; 23:01:14	(China) Tiantuo-3	NUDT	Low Earth (SSO)	Technology demonstration	In orbit	Operational
19 September; 23:01:14	(China) Xingchen 1	NUDT	Low Earth (SSO)	Technology demonstration	In orbit	Operational
19 September; 23:01:14	(China) Xingchen 2	NUDT	Low Earth (SSO)	Technology demonstration	In orbit	Operational
19 September; 23:01:14	(China) Xingchen 3	NUDT	Low Earth (SSO)	Technology demonstration	In orbit	Operational
19 September; 23:01:14	(China) Xingchen 4	NUDT	Low Earth (SSO)	Technology demonstration	In orbit	Operational
19 September; 23:01:14	(China) Xiwang-2A	CAMSAT	Low Earth (SSO)	Amateur radio	25 April 2023	Successful
19 September; 23:01:14	(China) Xiwang-2B	CAMSAT	Low Earth (SSO)	Amateur radio	In orbit	Operational
19 September; 23:01:14	(China) Xiwang-2C	CAMSAT	Low Earth (SSO)	Amateur radio	In orbit	Operational
19 September; 23:01:14	(China) Xiwang-2D	CAMSAT	Low Earth (SSO)	Amateur radio	In orbit	Operational
19 September; 23:01:14	(China) Xiwang-2E	CAMSAT	Low Earth (SSO)	Amateur radio	In orbit	Operational
19 September; 23:01:14	(China) Xiwang-2F	CAMSAT	Low Earth (SSO)	Amateur radio	In orbit	Operational
19 September; 23:01:14	(China) XY-2	CASC	Low Earth (SSO)	Technology demonstration	In orbit	Operational
19 September; 23:01:14	(China) ZDPS-2A	ZJU	Low Earth (SSO)	Technology demonstration	In orbit	Operational
19 September; 23:01:14	(China) ZDPS-2B	ZJU	Low Earth (SSO)	Technology demonstration	In orbit	Operational
19 September; 23:01:14	(China) ZJ-1	Tsinghua University	Low Earth (SSO)	Technology demonstration	In orbit	Operational
19 September; 23:01:14	(China) ZJ-2	Tsinghua / Xidian	Low Earth (SSO)	Technology demonstration	In orbit	Operational
19 September; 23:01:14	⚀ (China) DCBB	CAMSAT	Low Earth (SSO)	Education	In orbit	Operational
19 September; 23:01:14	Maiden flight of the Long March 6 vehicle.					
23 September; 21:59:38	(Russia) Rokot / Briz-KM		(Russia) Plesetsk Site 133/3		(Russia) VKO	
23 September; 21:59:38	(Russia) Kosmos 2507 (Strela-3M)	VKO	Low Earth	Communications	In orbit	Operational
23 September; 21:59:38	(Russia) Kosmos 2508 (Strela-3M)	VKO	Low Earth	Communications	In orbit	Operational
23 September; 21:59:38	(Russia) Kosmos 2509 (Strela-3M)	VKO	Low Earth	Communications	In orbit	Operational
25 September; 01:41:40	(China) Long March 11		(China) Jiuquan LS-95A		(China) CASC	
25 September; 01:41:40	(China) Pujiang-1	SAST	Low Earth (SSO)	Technology demonstration	In orbit	Operational
25 September; 01:41:40	⚀ (China) Tianwang 1A (Shankeda 2)	ShanghaiTech	Low Earth (SSO)	Technology demonstration	30 December 2022	Successful
25 September; 01:41:40	⚀ (China) Tianwang 1B (NJUST 2)	NJUST	Low Earth (SSO)	Technology demonstration	31 March 2021	Successful
25 September; 01:41:40	⚀ (China) Tianwang 1C (NJFA 1)	ShanghaiTech	Low Earth (SSO)	Technology demonstration	27 February 2021	Successful
25 September; 01:41:40	Maiden flight of the Long March 11 vehicle.					
28 September; 04:30:00	(India) PSLV-XL		(India) Satish Dhawan FLP		(India) ISRO	
28 September; 04:30:00	(India) Astrosat	ISRO	Low Earth	X-ray astronomy	In orbit	Operational
28 September; 04:30:00	(Indonesia) LAPAN-A2	LAPAN	Low Earth	Earth observation	In orbit	Operational
28 September; 04:30:00	(Canada) ExactView 9	exactEarth	Low Earth	Maritime observation	In orbit	Operational
28 September; 04:30:00	⚀ (United States) Lemur-2 1	NanoSatisfi	Low Earth	Earth observation	In orbit	Operational
28 September; 04:30:00	⚀ (United States) Lemur-2 2	NanoSatisfi	Low Earth	Earth observation	In orbit	Operational
28 September; 04:30:00	⚀ (United States) Lemur-2 3	NanoSatisfi	Low Earth	Earth observation	In orbit	Operational
28 September; 04:30:00	⚀ (United States) Lemur-2 4	NanoSatisfi	Low Earth	Earth observation	In orbit	Operational
29 September; 23:13:04	(China) Long March 3B/E		(China) Xichang LA-3		(China) CASC	
29 September; 23:13:04	(China) BeiDou I2-S	CNSA	Geosynchronous	Navigation	In orbit	Operational
30 September; 20:30:07	(France) Ariane 5 ECA		(France) Kourou ELA-3		(France) Arianespace	
30 September; 20:30:07	(Australia) NBN-Co 1A (Sky Muster)	NBN Co	Geosynchronous	Communications	In orbit	Operational
30 September; 20:30:07	(Argentina) ARSAT-2	ARSAT	Geosynchronous	Communications	In orbit	Operational
← Jan; Feb; Mar; Apr; May; Jun; Jul; Aug; Sep; Oct; Nov; Dec →; === October ===
1 October; 16:49:40	(Russia) Soyuz-U		(Kazakhstan) Baikonur Site 1/5		(Russia) Roscosmos	
1 October; 16:49:40	(Russia) Progress M-29M / 61P	Roscosmos	Low Earth (ISS)	ISS resupply	8 April 2016	Successful
2 October; 10:28:00	(United States) Atlas V 421		(United States) Cape Canaveral SLC-41		(United States) United Launch Alliance	
2 October; 10:28:00	(Mexico) Mexsat-2	SCT	Geosynchronous	Communications	In orbit	Operational
7 October; 04:13:04	(China) Long March 2D		(China) Jiuquan SLS-2		(China) CASC	
7 October; 04:13:04	(China) Jilin-1 Smart Verification Satellite	Chang Guang Satellite Technology	Low Earth (SSO)	Earth observation	In orbit	Operational
7 October; 04:13:04	(China) Jilin-1 Optical-A	Chang Guang Satellite Technology	Low Earth (SSO)	Earth observation	In orbit	Operational
7 October; 04:13:04	(China) Jilin-1 Video-01 (Lingqiao 1-01)	Chang Guang Satellite Technology	Low Earth (SSO)	Earth observation	In orbit	Operational
7 October; 04:13:04	(China) Jilin-1 Video-02 (Lingqiao 1-02)	Chang Guang Satellite Technology	Low Earth (SSO)	Earth observation	In orbit	Operational
8 October; 12:49:30	(United States) Atlas V 401		(United States) Vandenberg SLC-3E		(United States) United Launch Alliance	
8 October; 12:49:30	(United States) USA-264 (NOSS)	NRO	Low Earth	ELINT	In orbit	Operational
8 October; 12:49:30	(United States) USA-264 (NOSS)	NRO	Low Earth	ELINT	In orbit	Operational
8 October; 12:49:30	⚀ (United States) Aerocube-5c	The Aerospace Corporation	Low Earth	Technology demonstration	In orbit	Operational
8 October; 12:49:30	⚀ (United States) Aerocube-7	The Aerospace Corporation	Low Earth	Technology demonstration	In orbit	Operational
8 October; 12:49:30	⚀ (United States) AMSAT Fox-1	AMSAT	Low Earth	Amateur radio / Technology demonstration	In orbit	Operational
8 October; 12:49:30	⚀ (United States) ARC-1	UAF	Low Earth	Technology demonstration	In orbit	Operational
8 October; 12:49:30	⚀ (United States) BisonSat	SKC	Low Earth	Earth observation	In orbit	Operational
8 October; 12:49:30	⚀ (United States) LMRST-Sat	NASA / JPL	Low Earth	Technology demonstration	In orbit	Operational
8 October; 12:49:30	⚀ (United States) PropCube x 2	Tyvak Nano-Satellite Systems	Low Earth	Technology demonstration	In orbit	Operational
8 October; 12:49:30	⚀ (United States) SINOD-D x 2	SRI International	Low Earth	Technology demonstration	In orbit	Operational
8 October; 12:49:30	⚀ (United States) SNaP-3 x 3	U.S. Army SMDC	Low Earth	Technology demonstration	In orbit	Operational
8 October; 12:49:30	NRO Launch 55					
16 October; 16:16:04	(China) Long March 3B/E		(China) Xichang LC-2		(China) CASC	
16 October; 16:16:04	(Hong Kong) APStar-9	APT Satellite Holdings	Geosynchronous	Communications	In orbit	Operational
16 October; 20:40:11	(Russia) Proton-M / Briz-M		(Kazakhstan) Baikonur Site 200/39		(Russia) (United States) International Launch Services	
16 October; 20:40:11	(Turkey) Türksat 4B	Türksat	Geosynchronous	Communications	In orbit	Operational
26 October; 07:10:04	(China) Long March 2D		(China) Jiuquan SLS-2		(China) CASC	
26 October; 07:10:04	(China) Tianhui 1C	CNSA	Low Earth (SSO)	Earth observation (Cartography)	In orbit	Operational
31 October; 16:13:00	(United States) Atlas V 401		(United States) Cape Canaveral SLC-41		(United States) United Launch Alliance	
31 October; 16:13:00	(United States) USA-265 (GPS IIF-11)	U.S. Air Force	Medium Earth	Navigation	In orbit	Operational
31 October; 16:13:00	Named after Star Altair.					
← Jan; Feb; Mar; Apr; May; Jun; Jul; Aug; Sep; Oct; Nov; Dec →; === November ===
3 November; 16:25:04	(China) Long March 3B/E		(China) Xichang LC-3		(China) CASC	
3 November; 16:25:04	(China) ChinaSat 2C	CNSA	Geosynchronous	Communications	In orbit	Operational
4 November; 03:45:00	(United States) SPARK		(United States) Pacific Missile Range Facility LP-41		(United States) ORS	
4 November; 03:45:00	(United States) HiakaSat	ORS	Low Earth	Technology demonstration	4 November 2015	Launch failure
4 November; 03:45:00	⚀ (United States) EDSN x 8	NASA	Low Earth	Technology demonstration	4 November 2015	Launch failure
4 November; 03:45:00	⚀ (United States) PrintSat	Montana State University	Low Earth	Technology demonstration	4 November 2015	Launch failure
4 November; 03:45:00	⚀ (United States) Argus	St. Louis University and Vanderbilt University	Low Earth	Technology demonstration	4 November 2015	Launch failure
4 November; 03:45:00	⚀ (United States) STACEM	Utah State University	Low Earth	Technology demonstration	4 November 2015	Launch failure
4 November; 03:45:00	⚀ (United States) Supernova-Beta	Pumpkin, Inc.	Low Earth	Technology demonstration	4 November 2015	Launch failure
4 November; 03:45:00	Maiden flight of the SPARK/Super Strypi launch vehicle. Vehicle lost attitude control at T+1 minute.					
8 November; 07:06:04	(China) Long March 4B		(China) Taiyuan LC-9		(China) CASC	
8 November; 07:06:04	(China) Yaogan 28	CNSA	Low Earth (SSO)	Reconnaissance	In orbit	Operational
10 November; 21:34:07	(France) Ariane 5 ECA		(France) Kourou ELA-3		(France) Arianespace	
10 November; 21:34:07	(Saudi Arabia) Arabsat 6B	Arabsat	Geosynchronous	Communications	In orbit	Operational
10 November; 21:34:07	(India) GSAT-15	ISRO	Geosynchronous	Communications	In orbit	Operational
17 November; 06:33:41	(Russia) Soyuz-2.1b / Fregat		(Russia) Plesetsk Site 43/4		(Russia) RVSN RF	
17 November; 06:33:41	(Russia) Kosmos 2510 (EKS (Tundra))	VKO	Molniya	Early warning	In orbit	Operational
17 November; 06:33:41	First space component for Russia's new unified missile early warning network.					
20 November; 16:07:04	(China) Long March 3B/E		(China) Xichang LC-2		(China) CASC	
20 November; 16:07:04	(Laos) LaoSat-1	Laos National Authority for Science and Technology	Geosynchronous	Communications	In orbit	Operational
20 November; 16:07:04	First Laotian satellite					
24 November; 06:50:00	(Japan) H-IIA 204		(Japan) Tanegashima LA-Y1		(Japan) MHI	
24 November; 06:50:00	(Canada) Telstar 12V	Telesat	Geosynchronous	Communications	In orbit	Operational
26 November; 21:24:04	(China) Long March 4C		(China) Taiyuan LC-9		(China) CASC	
26 November; 21:24:04	(China) Yaogan 29	CNSA	Low Earth (SSO)	Reconnaissance	In orbit	Operational
← Jan; Feb; Mar; Apr; May; Jun; Jul; Aug; Sep; Oct; Nov; Dec →; === December ===
3 December; 04:04:00	(Italy) Vega		(France) Kourou ELV		(France) Arianespace	
3 December; 04:04:00	LISA Pathfinder	ESA / NASA	Sun–Earth L_{1}	Technology demonstration	In orbit	Operational
5 December; 14:08:33	(Russia) Soyuz-2-1v / Volga		(Russia) Plesetsk Site 43/4		(Russia) RVSN RF	
5 December; 14:08:33	(Russia) Kosmos 2511 (Kanopus-ST)	VKO	Low Earth (SSO)	Earth observation	8 December 2015; 05:43	Launch failure
5 December; 14:08:33	(Russia) Kosmos 2512 (KYuA-1)	Almaz-Antey	Low Earth (SSO)	Radar calibration	In orbit	Operational
5 December; 14:08:33	Kanopus-ST failed to separate from the Volga upper stage.					
6 December; 21:44:57	(United States) Atlas V 401		(United States) Cape Canaveral SLC-41		(United States) United Launch Alliance	
6 December; 21:44:57	(United States) Cygnus CRS OA-4; S.S. Deke Slayton II	Orbital ATK / NASA	Low Earth (ISS)	ISS resupply	20 February 2016	Successful
6 December; 21:44:57	(United States) SIMPL	NovaWurks	Low Earth	Technology demonstration	26 July 2022	Successful
6 December; 21:44:57	⚀ (United States) Flock-2e x 12	Planet Labs	Low Earth	Earth observation	First: 25 July 2017; Last: 14 August 2018	Successful
6 December; 21:44:57	⚀ (United States) CADRE	University of Michigan	Low Earth	Technology demonstration	3 January 2017	Successful
6 December; 21:44:57	⚀ (United States) MinXSS 1	University of Colorado Boulder	Low Earth	Solar physics, Space weather	5 May 2017	Successful
6 December; 21:44:57	⚀ (United States) Nodes x 2	NASA	Low Earth	Technology demonstration	23 September 2017	Successful
6 December; 21:44:57	⚀ (United States) STMSat 1	St. Thomas More Cathedral School	Low Earth	Education	21 April 2017	Successful
6 December; 21:44:57	Flight moved from Antares 130 rocket following launch failure of Cygnus CRS Orb-3. Originally scheduled for 1 April 2015. MinXSS was deployed into orbit from ISS on 16 May 2016.					
9 December; 16:46:04	(China) Long March 3B/E		(China) Xichang LC-3		(China) CASC	
9 December; 16:46:04	(China) ChinaSat 1C	CNSA	Geosynchronous	Communications	In orbit	Operational
11 December; 13:45:33	(Ukraine) Zenit-3F		(Kazakhstan) Baikonur Site 45/1		(Russia) Roscosmos	
11 December; 13:45:33	(Russia) Elektro-L No.2	Roscosmos	Geosynchronous	Meteorology	In orbit	Operational
13 December; 00:19:00	(Russia) Proton-M / Briz-M		(Kazakhstan) Baikonur Site 81/24		(Russia) Khrunichev	
13 December; 00:19:00	(Russia) Kosmos 2513 (Garpun No. 12L)	VKO	Geosynchronous	Communications	In orbit	Operational
15 December; 11:03:09	(Russia) Soyuz-FG		(Kazakhstan) Baikonur Site 1/5		(Russia) Roscosmos	
15 December; 11:03:09	(Russia) Soyuz TMA-19M	Roscosmos	Low Earth (ISS)	Expedition 46/47	18 June 2016; 09:15	Successful
15 December; 11:03:09	Crewed flight with three cosmonauts.					
16 December; 12:30:00	(India) PSLV-CA		(India) Satish Dhawan FLP		(India) ISRO	
16 December; 12:30:00	(Singapore) TeLEOS-1	AgilSpace	Low Earth	Earth observation	In orbit	Operational
16 December; 12:30:00	(Singapore) VELOX C1	NTU	Low Earth	Atmospheric science	In orbit	Operational
16 December; 12:30:00	⚀ (Singapore) VELOX 2	NTU	Low Earth	Technology demonstration	In orbit	Operational
16 December; 12:30:00	(Singapore) Kent Ridge 1	NUS	Low Earth	Earth observation	In orbit	Operational
16 December; 12:30:00	⚀ (Singapore) Galassia	NUS	Low Earth	Atmospheric science	In orbit	Operational
16 December; 12:30:00	⚀ (Singapore) Athenoxat-1	NTU	Low Earth	Earth observation	In orbit	Operational
17 December; 00:12:04	(China) Long March 2D		(China) Jiuquan SLS-2		(China) CASC	
17 December; 00:12:04	(China) DAMPE	CAS	Low Earth (SSO)	High-energy astronomy	In orbit	Operational
17 December; 11:51:56	(Russia) Soyuz ST-B / Fregat		(France) Kourou ELS		(France) Arianespace	
17 December; 11:51:56	Galileo FOC 8	ESA	Medium Earth	Navigation	In orbit	Operational
17 December; 11:51:56	Galileo FOC 9	ESA	Medium Earth	Navigation	In orbit	Operational
21 December; 08:44:39	(Russia) Soyuz-2.1a		(Kazakhstan) Baikonur Site 31/6		(Russia) Roscosmos	
21 December; 08:44:39	(Russia) Progress MS-01 / 62P	Roscosmos	Low Earth (ISS)	ISS resupply	3 July 2016; 07:50	Operational
21 December; 08:44:39	First launch of the new Progress-MS variant.					
22 December; 01:29:00	(United States) Falcon 9 Full Thrust		(United States) Cape Canaveral SLC-40		(United States) SpaceX	
22 December; 01:29:00	(United States) Orbcomm-2 F2	Orbcomm	Low Earth	Communications	In orbit	Operational
22 December; 01:29:00	(United States) Orbcomm-2 F5	Orbcomm	Low Earth	Communications	In orbit	Operational
22 December; 01:29:00	(United States) Orbcomm-2 F8	Orbcomm	Low Earth	Communications	In orbit	Operational
22 December; 01:29:00	(United States) Orbcomm-2 F10	Orbcomm	Low Earth	Communications	In orbit	Operational
22 December; 01:29:00	(United States) Orbcomm-2 F12	Orbcomm	Low Earth	Communications	In orbit	Operational
22 December; 01:29:00	(United States) Orbcomm-2 F13	Orbcomm	Low Earth	Communications	In orbit	Operational
22 December; 01:29:00	(United States) Orbcomm-2 F14	Orbcomm	Low Earth	Communications	In orbit	Operational
22 December; 01:29:00	(United States) Orbcomm-2 F15	Orbcomm	Low Earth	Communications	In orbit	Operational
22 December; 01:29:00	(United States) Orbcomm-2 F16	Orbcomm	Low Earth	Communications	In orbit	Operational
22 December; 01:29:00	(United States) Orbcomm-2 F17	Orbcomm	Low Earth	Communications	In orbit	Operational
22 December; 01:29:00	(United States) Orbcomm-2 F18	Orbcomm	Low Earth	Communications	In orbit	Operational
22 December; 01:29:00	First flight of the upgraded "full thrust" version of Falcon 9, first Falcon 9 flight after launch failure in June. First successful return to launch site and vertical landing of a first stage, demonstrated as part of a controlled descent test.					
24 December; 21:31:19	(Russia) Proton-M / Briz-M		(Kazakhstan) Baikonur Site 200/39		(Russia) Khrunichev	
24 December; 21:31:19	(Russia) Ekspress AMU1	RSCC	Geosynchronous	Communications	In orbit	Operational
28 December; 16:04:04	(China) Long March 3B/E		(China) Xichang LC-2		(China) CASC	
28 December; 16:04:04	(China) Gaofen 4	CNSA	Geosynchronous	Earth observation	In orbit	Operational

- ← Jan
- Feb
- Mar
- Apr
- May
- Jun
- Jul
- Aug
- Sep
- Oct
- Nov
- Dec →

== Suborbital flights ==
Date and time (UTC)	Rocket	Flight number	Launch site		LSP	
Date and time (UTC)	Payload (⚀ = CubeSat)	Operator	Orbit	Function	Decay (UTC)	Outcome
Date and time (UTC)	Remarks					
26 January; 09:13	(United States) Terrier-Improved Malemute		(United States) Poker Flat		(United States) NASA	
26 January; 09:13	(United States) M-TEX	Alaska	Suborbital	Auroral	26 January	Successful
26 January; 09:13	Apogee: ~160 kilometres (99 mi)?					
26 January; 09:14	(United States) Terrier-Orion		(United States) Poker Flat		(United States) NASA	
26 January; 09:14	(United States) MIST	Clemson	Suborbital	Auroral	26 January	Successful
26 January; 09:14	Apogee: ~130 kilometres (81 mi)?					
26 January; 09:46	(United States) Terrier-Improved Malemute		(United States) Poker Flat		(United States) NASA	
26 January; 09:46	(United States) M-TEX	Alaska	Suborbital	Auroral	26 January	Successful
26 January; 09:46	Apogee: ~160 kilometres (99 mi)?					
26 January; 09:47	(United States) Terrier-Orion		(United States) Poker Flat		(United States) NASA	
26 January; 09:47	(United States) MIST	Clemson	Suborbital	Auroral	26 January	Successful
26 January; 09:47	Apogee: ~130 kilometres (81 mi)?					
28 January; 10:41	(United States) Talos Terrier Oriole Nihka		(United States) Poker Flat		(United States) NASA	
28 January; 10:41	(United States) ASSP	USU	Suborbital	Auroral	28 January	Successful
28 January; 10:41	Apogee: ~590 kilometres (370 mi)?					
31 January; 02:36:00	(India) Agni V		(India) Integrated Test Range Launch Complex IV		(India) DRDO	
31 January; 02:36:00		DRDO	Suborbital	Missile test	31 January	Successful
31 January; 02:36:00	Apogee: ~800 kilometres (500 mi)					
19 February	(India) Prithvi II		(India) Integrated Test Range Launch Complex 3		(India) DRDO	
19 February		DRDO	Suborbital	Missile test	19 February	Successful
19 February	Apogee: ~100 kilometres (62 mi)					
19 February; 22:06	(Brazil) (United States) VS-30/Improved Orion		(Norway) Andøya		(Norway) Andøya	
19 February; 22:06	(Sweden) (Norway) ICI-4 (CanoRock 4)	Oslo/Andøya	Suborbital	Technology	19 February	Successful
19 February; 22:06	Apogee: 365 kilometres (227 mi)					
22 February; 07:52	(Brazil) VSB-30		(Sweden) Esrange		(France) CNES	
22 February; 07:52	(France) Cryofenix	CNES	Suborbital	Microgravity	22 February	Successful
22 February; 07:52	Apogee: 265 kilometres (165 mi)					
22 February	(United States) UGM-133 Trident II D5		(United States) Submarine, Pacific Ocean		(United States) US Navy	
22 February		US Navy	Suborbital	Missile test	22 February	Successful
22 February	(United States) UGM-133 Trident II D5		(United States) Submarine, Pacific Ocean		(United States) US Navy	
22 February		US Navy	Suborbital	Missile test	22 February	Successful
24 February; 07:30	(United States) Terrier-Oriole		(United States) Wallops Island		(United States) TBD	
24 February; 07:30		DOD	Suborbital	Missile Defense Test	24 February	Successful
24 February; 07:30	FTX-19 target, apogee: ~150 kilometres (93 mi)?					
24 February; 07:30	(United States) Terrier-Oriole		(United States) Wallops Island		(United States) TBD	
24 February; 07:30		DOD	Suborbital	Missile Defense Test	24 February	Successful
24 February; 07:30	FTX-19 target, apogee: ~150 kilometres (93 mi)?					
24 February; 07:30	(United States) Terrier-Oriole		(United States) Wallops Island		(United States) TBD	
24 February; 07:30		DOD	Suborbital	Missile Defense Test	24 February	Successful
24 February; 07:30	FTX-19 target, apogee: ~150 kilometres (93 mi)?					
25 February; 12:26	(Canada) Black Brant IX		(United States) White Sands		(United States) NASA	
25 February; 12:26	(United States) MOSC 2	AFRL	Suborbital	Ionospheric research	25 February	Successful
25 February; 12:26	Apogee: 300 kilometres (190 mi)?					
26 February	(Russia) UR-100NU		(Russia) Yasniy		(Russia) RVSN	
26 February		RVSN	Suborbital	Missile test	26 February	Launch failure
26 February	Yu-71 Hypersonic Vehicle Test					
1 March	(North Korea) Hwasong-6		(North Korea) Nampo		(North Korea) Korean People's Army Strategic Force	
1 March	(North Korea)	Korean People's Army Strategic Force	Suborbital	Missile test	1 March	Successful
1 March	Apogee: 134 kilometres (83 mi). 1 of 2.					
1 March	(North Korea) Hwasong-6		(North Korea) Nampo		(North Korea) Korean People's Army Strategic Force	
1 March	(North Korea)	Korean People's Army Strategic Force	Suborbital	Missile test	1 March	Successful
1 March	Apogee: 134 kilometres (83 mi). 2 of 2.					
5 March; 01:44	(Brazil) VS-30		(Norway) Andøya		(Germany) DLR	
5 March; 01:44	(Germany) WADIS-2	DLR	Suborbital	Atmospheric	5 March	Successful
5 March; 01:44	Apogee: 126 kilometres (78 mi), 13 Super Loki meteorological rockets were also launched					
9 March	(Pakistan) Shaheen-III		(Pakistan) Sonmiani		(Pakistan) ASFC	
9 March		ASFC	Suborbital	Missile test	9 March	Successful
9 March	Apogee: 500 kilometres (310 mi)?					
18 March	(Russia) RS-26 Rubezh		(Russia) Kapustin Yar		(Russia) RVSN	
18 March		RVSN	Suborbital	Missile test	18 March	Successful
23 March; 10:36	(United States) LGM-30G Minuteman III		(United States) Vandenberg LF-10		(United States) US Air Force	
23 March; 10:36		US Air Force	Suborbital	Test flight	23 March	Successful
23 March; 10:36	GT214GM, Apogee: ~1,300 kilometres (810 mi) ?					
27 March; 10:54	(United States) LGM-30G Minuteman III		(United States) Vandenberg LF-04		(United States) US Air Force	
27 March; 10:54		US Air Force	Suborbital	Test flight	27 March	Successful
27 March; 10:54	GT215GM, Apogee: ~1,300 kilometres (810 mi) ?					
30 March	(Brazil) VSB-30		(Norway) Andøya		(Australia) DSTO	
30 March	(Australia) HiFire-7	DSTO	Suborbital	Technology demonstration	30 March	Successful
9 April	(India) Dhanush		(India) Ship, Indian Ocean		(India) DRDO	
9 April		DRDO	Suborbital	Target	9 April	Successful
9 April	Apogee: ~100 kilometres (62 mi)					
15 April	(Pakistan) Ghauri		(Pakistan) Tilla		Army of Pakistan	
15 April	(Pakistan) Haft-5	Army of Pakistan	Suborbital	Missile test	15 April	Successful
15 April	Apogee: 100 kilometres (62 mi)					
16 April; 04:22	(India) Agni-III		(India) ITR IC-4		(India) Indian Army	
16 April; 04:22		Indian Army	Suborbital	Missile test	16 April	Successful
16 April; 04:22	Apogee: 350 kilometres (220 mi)					
18 April; 11:01	(United States) Terrier-Improved Malemute		(United States) Wallops Island		(United States) NASA	
18 April; 11:01	(United States) Rocksat-X	University of Colorado Boulder	Suborbital	Student Research	18 April	Successful
18 April; 11:01	Apogee: ~174 kilometres (108 mi)					
23 April; 07:35	(Brazil) VSB-30		(Sweden) Esrange		(Europe) EuroLaunch	
23 April; 07:35	(Germany) / TEXUS-51	DLR/ESA	Suborbital	Microgravity	23 April	Successful
23 April; 07:35	Apogee: 261 kilometres (162 mi)					
27 April; 04:55	(Brazil) VSB-30		(Sweden) Esrange		(Europe) EuroLaunch	
27 April; 04:55	(Germany) / TEXUS-52	DLR/ESA	Suborbital	Microgravity	27 April	Successful
27 April; 04:55	Apogee: 255 kilometres (158 mi)					
2 May; 08:30:01	(Canada) Black Brant IX		(United States) White Sands		(United States) NASA	
2 May; 08:30:01	(United States) OGRESS	University of Iowa	Suborbital	X-Ray Astronomy	2 May	Successful
2 May; 08:30:01	Apogee: 272 kilometres (169 mi)					
20 May; 10:37	(United States) LGM-30G Minuteman III		(United States) Vandenberg LF-09		(United States) US Air Force	
20 May; 10:37		US Air Force	Suborbital	Test flight	20 May	Successful
20 May; 10:37	GT212GM, Apogee: ~1,300 kilometres (810 mi) ?					
21 May; 19:15	(Canada) Black Brant IX		(United States) White Sands		(United States) NASA	
21 May; 19:15	(United States) EVE	CU Boulder	Suborbital	SDO calibration	21 May	Launch failure
21 May; 19:15	Second stage failure, flight was terminated safety officials about four seconds into the second stage burn after data showed the vehicle was flying off-course. The payload carrying the experiment separated from the rocket and descended via parachute.					
6 June	(United States) SM-3-IIA		(United States) San Nicolas Island		(United States) US Navy	
6 June		US Navy	Suborbital	ABM test	6 June	Successful
6 June	Maiden flight of SM-3 Block IIA Cooperative Development Controlled Test Vehicle-01 (SCD CTV-01)					
25 June; 10:00	(United States) Terrier-Improved Orion		(United States) Wallops Island		(United States) NASA	
25 June; 10:00	(United States) RockOn	CU Boulder	Suborbital	Student experiments	25 June	Successful
25 June; 10:00	Apogee: 118 kilometres (73 mi)					
26 June	(United States) ARAV ?		(United States) Kauai		(United States) MDA	
26 June		MDA	Suborbital	ABM target	26 June	Launch failure
26 June	Aegis radar target					
30 June; 04:55	(Brazil) VSB-30		(Sweden) Esrange		(Europe) EuroLaunch	
30 June; 04:55	(Germany) MAPHEUS-5	DLR	Suborbital	Technology demonstration	30 June	Successful
30 June; 04:55	Apogee: 252 kilometres (157 mi)					
7 July; 10:15	(United States) Black Brant IX		(United States) Wallops Island		(United States) NASA	
7 July; 10:15	(United States) SOAREX-8	NASA	Suborbital	Technology demonstration	7 July	Successful
7 July; 10:15	Apogee: 350 kilometres (220 mi)					
29 July; 08:30	(United States) ARAV ?	MMW E1	(United States) Kauai		(United States) MDA	
29 July; 08:30		MDA	Suborbital	ABM target	29 July	Successful
29 July; 08:30	Apogee: 100 kilometres (62 mi)?, Aegis MMW E1 target, successful intercept by SM-6 Dual I missile					
30 July; 06:15	(United States) ARAV ?	MMW E2	(United States) Kauai		(United States) MDA	
30 July; 06:15		MDA	Suborbital	ABM target	30 July	Successful
30 July; 06:15	Apogee: 100 kilometres (62 mi)?, Aegis MMW E2 target, successful intercept by SM-2 Block IV missile					
12 August; 10:14	(United States) Terrier-Improved Malemute		(United States) Wallops Island		(United States) NASA	
12 August; 10:14	(United States) Rocksat-X	Various universities	Suborbital	Student Research	12 August	Successful
12 August; 10:14	Apogee: ~156km (97 miles).					
19 August; 10:03	(United States) LGM-30G Minuteman III		(United States) Vandenberg LF-10		(United States) US Air Force	
19 August; 10:03		US Air Force	Suborbital	Test flight	19 August	Successful
19 August; 10:03	GT213GM, Apogee: ~1,300 kilometres (810 mi) ?					
22 August; 15:13	(Russia) RS-12M Topol		(Russia) Kapustin Yar		(Russia) RVSN	
22 August; 15:13		RVSN	Suborbital	Missile test	22 August	Successful
27 August; 17:45	(Canada) Black Brant IX		(United States) White Sands		(United States) NASA	
27 August; 17:45	(United States) MOSES-2	MSU	Suborbital	Solar astronomy	27 August	Successful
27 August; 17:45	Apogee: 185 miles (298 km)					
3 September; 17:01	(Canada) Black Brant IX		(United States) White Sands		(United States) NASA	
3 September; 17:01	(United States) (Japan) (Spain) (Norway) (France) CLASP	NASA / JAXA / IAC / IAS	Suborbital	Solar astronomy	3 September	Successful
3 September; 17:01	Apogee: 167 miles (269 km)					
11 September; 11:00:00	(Japan) S-520		(Japan) Uchinoura		(Japan) JAXA	
11 September; 11:00:00	(Japan)	HU/UT/TU/JAXA	Suborbital	Microgravity	11 September	Successful
11 September; 11:00:00	Apogee: 312 km					
16 September; 19:06	(Canada) Black Brant XI		(Norway) Andøya		(United States) NASA	
16 September; 19:06	(United States) CARE II	NRL	Suborbital	Aeronomy	16 September	Successful
16 September; 19:06	Apogee: 299 kilometres (186 mi)					
30 September; 08:28	(France) M51		(France) Landes		(France) DGA/Marine nationale	
30 September; 08:28		DGA/Marine nationale	Suborbital	Test flight	30 September	Successful
30 September; 08:28	Apogee: 500 kilometres (310 mi), apparently launched from the land test pad, rather than from a submarine.					
2 October; 05:39:00	(Brazil) / (United States) VSB-30/Improved Orion		(Sweden) Esrange		(Sweden) Swedish Space Corporation	
2 October; 05:39:00	(Sweden) O-STATES 1	SNSB	Suborbital	Atmospheric Research	2 October	Successful
2 October; 05:39:00	Apogee: 246 kilometres (153 mi)					
7 October; 23:07:00	(United States) Black Brant IX		(United States) Wallops Island		(United States) NASA	
7 October; 23:07:00	(United States) Technology Test Flight	NASA GSFC	Suborbital	Rocket motor test	7 October	Successful
7 October; 23:07:00	(United States) LEO-1	Orbital ATK	Suborbital	Materials Testing	7 October	Successful
7 October; 23:07:00	(United States) NNS	NASA	Suborbital	Materials Testing	7 October	Successful
7 October; 23:07:00	Apogee: 257.5 kilometers (160mi). Test flight of the new Black Brant Mk4 sustainer motor. Other payloads included a cloud of barium and strontium, which was deployed to test the rocket's payload ejection system and was visible for miles along the East Coast of the United States.					
19 October; 14:09:00	(Brazil) / (United States) VSB-30/Improved Orion		(Sweden) Esrange		(Sweden) Swedish Space Corporation	
19 October; 14:09:00	(Sweden) O-STATES 2	SNSB	Suborbital	Atmospheric Research	19 October	Successful
19 October; 14:09:00	Apogee: 244 kilometres (152 mi)					
20 October	(United States) Terrier-Orion	ADS-15 E2	(United Kingdom) South Uist, Hebrides		(United States) MDA	
20 October		DOD	Suborbital	Target	20 October	Successful
20 October	SM-3 Target, apogee: ~100 kilometres (62 mi)?					
20 October	(United States) SM-3	ADS-15 E2	(United States) USS Ross (DDG-71), Hebrides Range		(United States) US Navy	
20 October		US Navy	Suborbital	ABM test	20 October	Successful
20 October	First Aegis-Test in the North Atlantic, successful intercept, apogee: ~100 kilometres (62 mi)?					
21 October; 12:45:00	(United States) LGM-30G Minuteman III		(United States) Vandenberg LF-04		(United States) US Air Force	
21 October; 12:45:00		US Air Force	Suborbital	Test flight	21 October	Successful
21 October; 12:45:00	GT216GM, Apogee: ~1,300 kilometres (810 mi) ?					
28 October; 11:30	(Russia) RS-24 Yars		(Russia) Plesetsk		(Russia) RVSN	
28 October; 11:30		RVSN	Suborbital	Missile test	28 October	Successful
30 October	(Russia) RS-12M Topol		(Russia) Plesetsk		(Russia) RVSN	
30 October		RVSN	Suborbital	Missile test	30 October	Successful
30 October	(Russia) R-29RMU Sineva		(Russia) K-117 Bryansk, Barents Sea		(Russia) VMF	
30 October		VMF	Suborbital	Missile test	30 October	Successful
30 October	(Russia) R-29R Volna		(Russia) K-223 Podolsk, Sea of Okhotsk		(Russia) VMF	
30 October		VMF	Suborbital	Missile test	30 October	Successful
31 October; 23:00 ?	(China) B-611		(China) Shuangchengzi		(China) PLA	
31 October; 23:00 ?		PLA	Suborbital	ABM target	31 October	Successful
31 October; 23:00 ?	Target					
31 October; 23:00 ?	(China) SC-19		(China) Korla		(China) PLA	
31 October; 23:00 ?		PLA	Suborbital	ABM test	31 October	Successful
31 October; 23:00 ?	Interceptor, successful intercept					
1 November; 03:05	(United States) SRALT	FTO-02 E2a	(United States) C-17, Pacific Ocean		(United States) MDA	
1 November; 03:05		MDA	Suborbital	THAAD target	1 November	Successful
1 November; 03:05	Apogee: 300 kilometres (190 mi), successful intercepted					
1 November; 03:07	(United States) THAAD	FTO-02 E2a	(United States) Wake Island		(United States) US Army	
1 November; 03:07	(United States)	US Army/MDA	Suborbital	ABM test	1 November	Successful
1 November; 03:07	Intercepted target missile, apogee: 100 kilometres (62 mi)					
1 November; 03:10	(United States) eMRBM	FTO-02 E2a	(United States) C-17, Pacific Ocean		(United States) MDA	
1 November; 03:10	(United States)	MDA	Suborbital	THAAD target	1 November	Successful
1 November; 03:10	Apogee: 300 kilometres (190 mi), successful intercepted					
1 November; 03:12	(United States) THAAD	FTO-02 E2a	(United States) Wake Island		(United States) US Army	
1 November; 03:12	(United States)	US Army/MDA	Suborbital	ABM test	1 November	Successful
1 November; 03:12	Intercepted target missile, apogee: 100 kilometres (62 mi)					
6 November; 15:01	(United States) SpaceLoft XL		(United States) Spaceport America		(United States) UP Aerospace	
6 November; 15:01	(United States) FOP-4	NASA	Suborbital	Four technology demonstration experiments	6 November	Successful
6 November; 15:01	Mission SL-10, Apogee: 120.7 kilometers (74.98 miles). First private suborbital rocket to demonstrate ejection of recoverable payloads.					
8 November; 02:00	(United States) UGM-133 Trident II D5		(United States) USS Kentucky, Pacific Ocean		(United States) US Navy	
8 November; 02:00		US Navy	Suborbital	Missile test	8 November	Successful
8 November; 02:00	Demonstration and Shakedown Operation 26 (DASO-26)					
9 November; 04:15	(India) Agni-IV		(India) Integrated Test Range		(India) DRDO	
9 November; 04:15		DRDO	Suborbital	Missile Test	9 November	Successful
9 November; 04:15	Apogee: ~850 kilometres (530 mi)?					
9 November; 20:00	(United States) UGM-133 Trident II D5		(United States) USS Kentucky, Pacific Ocean		(United States) US Navy	
9 November; 20:00		US Navy	Suborbital	Missile test	9 November	Successful
9 November; 20:00	Demonstration and Shakedown Operation 26 (DASO-26)					
14 November	(Russia) RSM-56 Bulava		(Russia) K-551 Vladimir Monomakh, White Sea		(Russia) VMF	
14 November		VMF	Suborbital	Missile test	14 November	Successful
14 November	(Russia) RSM-56 Bulava		(Russia) K-551 Vladimir Monomakh, White Sea		(Russia) VMF	
14 November		VMF	Suborbital	Missile test	14 November	Successful
14 November	Missile did not hit its targets at the Kura test site. The warheads did reach the Kamchatka region, but the miss was fairly large, but that was still not significant enough to abort the flight					
17 November; 12:12	(Russia) RS-12M Topol		(Russia) Kapustin Yar		(Russia) RVSN	
17 November; 12:12		RVSN	Suborbital	Missile test	17 November	Successful
21 November	(Iran) Ghadr-1		(Iran) Semnan ?		(Iran) IRGC	
21 November	(Iran)	IGRC	Suborbital	Missile test	21 November	Successful
21 November	apogee: 150 kilometres (93 mi)					
23 November; 17:21	(United States) New Shepard		(United States) Corn Ranch		(United States) Blue Origin	
23 November; 17:21	(United States) New Shepard	Blue Origin	Suborbital	Test flight	23 November	Successful
23 November; 17:21	Apogee: 100.5 kilometres (62.4 mi). Second test flight of the New Shepard launch system, first to cross the Kármán line, and first to achieve a powered landing of its propulsion stage.					
25 November; 04:17	(Canada) Black Brant IX		(United States) White Sands		(United States) NASA	
25 November; 04:17	(United States) PICTURE-B	UMass	Suborbital	Astronomy	25 November	Successful
25 November; 04:17	apogee: 217 kilometres (135 mi)					
30 November; 07:25	(United States) Talos Terrier Oriole Nihka		(Norway) Andøya		(United States) NASA	
30 November; 07:25	(United States) CAPER	Dartmouth College	Suborbital	Auroral research	30 November	Launch failure
30 November; 07:25	Third stage failure, payload recovered					
1 December; 05:00	(Brazil) VSB-30		(Sweden) Esrange		(Europe) EuroLaunch	
1 December; 05:00	(Sweden) MASER-13	SSC	Suborbital	Microgravity	1 December	Successful
1 December; 05:00	apogee: 270 kilometres (170 mi)					
5 December; 04:45	(Canada) Black Brant IX		(United States) White Sands		(United States) NASA	
5 December; 04:45	(United States) DXL-2	U of M	Suborbital	Astronomy	5 December	Successful
5 December; 04:45	apogee: 224 kilometres (139 mi)					
8 December	(United States) SM-3-IIA		(United States) San Nicolas Island		(United States) US Navy	
8 December		US Navy	Suborbital	ABM test	8 December	Successful
8 December	Second flight of SM-3 Block IIA Cooperative Development Controlled Test Vehicle-02 (SCD CTV-02)					
10 December; 06:12	(Israel) Silver Sparrow		F-15 Eagle, Israel		(Israel) IAF	
10 December; 06:12		IAI/IDF	Suborbital	ABM target	10 December	Successful
10 December; 06:12	Arrow-3 target, successfully intercepted, apogee: ~150 kilometres (93 mi)					
10 December; 06:15	(Israel) Arrow III		(Israel) Negev		(Israel) IAF	
10 December; 06:15		IAI/IDF	Suborbital	ABM Test	10 December	Successful
10 December; 06:15	First test of the Arrow-III against a target, successful intercept over the Mediterranean					
10 December	(United States) SRALT	FTO-02 E1a	(United States) C-17, Pacific Ocean		(United States) MDA	
10 December		MDA	Suborbital	SM-3-IB target	10 December	Successful
10 December	Apogee: 300 kilometres (190 mi), successful intercepted					
10 December	(United States) SM-3-IB	FTO-02 E1a	(United States) Kauai		(United States) US Navy	
10 December		US Navy	Suborbital	ABM test	10 December	Successful
10 December	First intercept flight test of a land-based Aegis Ballistic Missile Defense (BMD) weapon system					
10 December; 13:55	(United States) Juno		(United States) Fort Wingate LC-96		(United States) US Army	
10 December; 13:55		US Army	Suborbital	Target	10 December	Successful
10 December; 13:55	Target for MIM-104 Patriot PAC-3 MSE test, successfully intercepted					
11 December	(Pakistan) Shaheen-III		(Pakistan) Sonmiani		(Pakistan) ASFC	
11 December		ASFC	Suborbital	Missile test	11 December	Successful
11 December	Apogee: 500 kilometres (310 mi)?					
12 December	(Russia) R-29RMU Sineva		(Russia) K-51 Verkhoturye, Barents Sea		(Russia) VMF	
12 December		VMF	Suborbital	Missile test	12 December	Successful
13 December; 04:32	(Canada) Black Brant XIIA		(Norway) Andøya		(United States) NASA	
13 December; 04:32	(United States) RENU 2	New Hampshire	Suborbital	Geospace	13 December	Successful
13 December; 04:32	Apogee: 447 kilometres (278 mi)					
15 December	(Pakistan) Shaheen-IA		(Pakistan) Sonmiani		(Pakistan) ASFC	
15 December		ASFC	Suborbital	Missile test	15 December	Successful
18 December; 06:52	(Canada) Black Brant IX		(United States) White Sands		(United States) NASA	
18 December; 06:52	(United States) FORTIS	JHU	Suborbital	UV Astronomy	18 December	Successful
18 December; 06:52	apogee: 282 kilometres (175 mi)					
24 December; 17:55	(Russia) RS-12M Topol		(Russia) Kapustin Yar		(Russia) RVSN	
24 December; 17:55		RVSN	Suborbital	Missile test	24 December	Successful

== Deep space rendezvous ==
Date (GMT)	Spacecraft	Event	Remarks
10 January	Chang'e 5-T1	Injection into Selenocentric orbit	Departed from Earth–Moon L2 on 4 January.
11 January	Cassini	109th flyby of Titan	Closest approach: 970 kilometres (603 mi).
12 February	Cassini	110th flyby of Titan	Closest approach: 1,200 kilometres (746 mi).
6 March	Dawn	Enters orbit of Ceres	1st visit to a dwarf planet.
16 March	Cassini	111th flyby of Titan	Closest approach: 2,275 kilometres (1,413 mi).
30 April	MESSENGER	Impact to Mercury	The crash occurred on the side of the planet not visible from Earth.
7 May	Cassini	112th flyby of Titan	Closest approach: 2,722 kilometres (1,691 mi).
16 June	Cassini	4th flyby of Dione	Closest approach: 516 kilometres (321 mi).
7 July	Cassini	113th flyby of Titan	Closest approach: 10,953 kilometres (6,806 mi).
14 July	New Horizons	First flyby of Pluto and Charon	2nd visit to a dwarf planet. Closest approach: 12,500 km (7,800 mi).
17 August	Cassini	5th flyby of Dione	Closest approach: 474 kilometres (295 mi).
28 September	Cassini	114th flyby of Titan	Closest approach: 1,036 kilometres (643 mi).
14 October	Cassini	Flyby of Enceladus	Closest approach: 1,839 kilometres (1,142 mi).
28 October	Cassini	Flyby of Enceladus	Closest approach: 49 kilometres (30 mi).
12 November	Cassini	115th flyby of Titan	Closest approach: 11,920 kilometres (7,407 mi).
3 December	Hayabusa2	Flyby of Earth	Gravity assist
3 December	PROCYON	Flyby of Earth	Gravity assist en route to cancelled asteroid flyby.
4 December	Shin'en 2	Flyby of Earth	Gravity assist
7 December	Akatsuki	Venus orbit insertion	Akatsuki's 2nd flyby of Venus and 2nd (successful) attempt at orbit insertion.
19 December	Cassini	Flyby of Enceladus	Closest approach: 4,999 kilometres (3,106 mi).

== Extra-Vehicular Activities (EVAs) ==
Start date/time	Duration	End time	Spacecraft	Crew	Remarks
21 February; 12:45	6 hours 41 minutes	19:26	Expedition 42/43 ISS Quest	(United States) Barry E. Wilmore (United States) Terry W. Virts	Rigged and routed power and data cables at the forward end of the Harmony module as part of preparations for the installation of the International Docking Adapter at PMA-2.
25 February; 11:51	6 hours 43 minutes	18:34	Expedition 42/43 ISS Quest	(United States) Barry E. Wilmore (United States) Terry W. Virts	Completed power and data cable routing at the forward end of the Harmony module. Removed launch locks from forward and aft berthing ports of Tranquility to prepare for relocation of the Permanent Multipurpose Module and the installation of the Bigelow Expandable Activity Module. Lubricated end effector of Canadarm2.
1 March; 11:52	5 hours 38 minutes	17:30	Expedition 42/43 ISS Quest	(United States) Terry W. Virts (United States) Barry E. Wilmore	Finished cable routing, antenna and retro-reflector installation on both sides of the ISS truss and on other modules in preparation for the installation of the International Docking Adapter at PMA-2 and 3.
10 August; 14:20	5 hours 31 minutes	19:51	Expedition 44/45 ISS Pirs	(Russia) Gennady Padalka (Russia) Mikhail Korniyenko	Installed gap spanners on the hull of the station for facilitating movement of crew members on future spacewalks, cleaned windows of the Zvezda Service Module, install fasteners on communications antennas, replaced an aging docking antenna, photographed various locations and hardware on Zvezda and nearby modules, and retrieved a space environment experiment.
28 October; 12:03	7 hours 16 minutes	19:19	Expedition 45 ISS Quest	(United States) Scott Kelly (United States) Kjell N. Lindgren	Prepared a Main Bus Switching Unit for repair, installed a thermal cover on the Alpha Magnetic Spectrometer, lubricated elements of the Space Station Remote Manipulator System, and routed data and power cables to prepare for the installation of the International Docking Adaptor at PMA-2 and 3.
6 November; 11:22	7 hours 48 minutes	19:10	Expedition 45 ISS Quest	(United States) Scott Kelly (United States) Kjell N. Lindgren	Worked to restore a portion of the ISS's cooling system to its primary configuration, returning ammonia coolant levels to normal in the primary and backup radiator arrays.
21 December; 13:45	3 hours 16 minutes	16:01	Expedition 46 ISS Quest	(United States) Scott Kelly (United States) Timothy Kopra	Released a brake on the Mobile Servicing System to allow it to be properly stowed prior to the arrival of a visiting Progress vehicle. Routed cables in preparation for the installation of the Nauka module and the International Docking Adapter, and retrieved tools from a toolbox.

== Space debris events ==
Date/Time (UTC)	Source object	Event type	Pieces tracked	Remarks
3 February 17:40	DMSP 5D-2/F13 (USA-109)	Satellite breakup	159	The breakup was most likely caused by a battery explosion. This satellite had been launched in 1995. Another satellite from the same series, DMSP 5D-2/F11, had broken up in 2004. Debris are expected to remain in orbit for decades.
25 November 7:20	NOAA-16	Satellite breakup	275	As this weather satellite, launched in 2000, had a similar construction to the DMSP satellite which broke up in February 2015, the same cause is suspected (battery overheating and explosion).
22 December 16:00	Briz-M upper stage	Booster explosion	9	A Briz-M upper-stage booster, having subsisted in geosynchronous transfer orbit since launching the Canadian Nimiq 6 commsat in 2012, was seen to have broken up into 9 pieces as of 26 January 2016. Orbital analysis of the debris allowed to time the explosion within one minute of 16:00 UTC on 22 December 2015. Three other Briz-M upper stages had exploded earlier in 2007, 2010 and 2012.

== Orbital launch statistics ==
=== By country ===
For the purposes of this section, the yearly tally of orbital launches by country assigns each flight to the country of origin of the rocket, not to the launch services provider or the spaceport. For example, Soyuz launches by Arianespace in Kourou are counted under Russia because Soyuz-2 is a Russian rocket.

Country	Launches	Successes	Failures	Partial failures
China	19	19	0	0
France	6	6	0	0
India	5	5	0	0
Iran	1	1	0	0
Italy	3	3	0	0
Japan	4	4	0	0
Russia	27 (Note: Includes three European Soyuz launches from Kourou, French Guiana by Arianespace)	24	2	1
Ukraine	2 (Note: Zenit and Dnepr rockets were launched from Russia and/or Kazakhstan)	2	0	0
United States	20	18	2	0
World	87	82	4	1

=== By rocket ===
- Ariane 5
- Atlas V
- Delta II
- Delta IV
- Delta IV Heavy
- Falcon 9
- H-IIA
- H-IIB
- Long March 2
- Long March 3
- Long March 4
- Long March 6
- Long March 11
- PSLV
- Soyuz-U
- Soyuz-FG
- Soyuz-2 (Russia)
- Soyuz-ST (Europe)
- Proton-M
- Rokot
- Vega
- Others

==== By family ====
Family	Country	Launches	Successes	Failures	Partial failures	Remarks
Ariane	France	6	6	0	0	
Atlas	United States	9	9	0	0	
Delta	United States	3	3	0	0	
Falcon	United States	7	6	1	0	
GSLV	India	1	1	0	0	
H-II	Japan	4	4	0	0	
Long March	China	19	19	0	0	
PSLV	India	4	4	0	0	
R-7	Russia	17	15	1	1	
R-36	Ukraine	1	1	0	0	
Safir	Iran	1	1	0	0	
Strypi	United States	1	0	1	0	
Universal Rocket	Russia	10	9	1	0	
Vega	Italy	3	3	0	0	
Zenit	Ukraine	1	1	0	0	

==== By type ====
Rocket	Country	Family	Launches	Successes	Failures	Partial failures	Remarks
Ariane 5	France	Ariane	6	6	0	0	
Atlas V	United States	Atlas	9	9	0	0	
Delta II	United States	Delta	1	1	0	0	
Delta IV	United States	Delta	2	2	0	0	
Dnepr	Ukraine	R-36	1	1	0	0	Final flight
Falcon 9	United States	Falcon	7	6	1	0	
GSLV	India	GSLV	1	1	0	0	
H-IIA	Japan	H-II	3	3	0	0	
H-IIB	Japan	H-II	1	1	0	0	
Long March 2	China	Long March	4	4	0	0	
Long March 3	China	Long March	9	9	0	0	
Long March 4	China	Long March	4	4	0	0	
Long March 6	China	Long March	1	1	0	0	Maiden flight
Long March 11	China	Long March	1	1	0	0	Maiden flight
Proton	Russia	Universal Rocket	8	7	1	0	
PSLV	India	PSLV	4	4	0	0	
Safir	Iran	Safir	1	1	0	0	
Soyuz	Russia	R-7	7	7	0	0	
Soyuz-2	Russia	R-7	10	8	1	1	
Super Strypi	United States	Strypi	1	0	1	0	Maiden flight
UR-100	Russia	Universal Rocket	2	2	0	0	
Vega	Italy	Vega	3	3	0	0	
Zenit	Ukraine	Zenit	1	1	0	0	

==== By configuration ====
Rocket	Country	Type	Launches	Successes	Failures	Partial failures	Remarks
Ariane 5 ECA	France	Ariane 5	6	6	0	0	
Atlas V 401	United States	Atlas V	4	4	0	0	
Atlas V 421	United States	Atlas V	2	2	0	0	
Atlas V 501	United States	Atlas V	1	1	0	0	
Atlas V 551	United States	Atlas V	2	2	0	0	
Delta II 7320	United States	Delta II	1	1	0	0	
Delta IV Medium+ (4,2)	United States	Delta IV	1	1	0	0	
Delta IV Medium+ (5,4)	United States	Delta IV	1	1	0	0	
Dnepr	Ukraine	R-36	1	1	0	0	Final flight
Falcon 9 v1.1	United States	Falcon 9	6	5	1	0	
Falcon 9 Full Thrust	United States	Falcon 9	1	1	0	0	Maiden flight
GSLV Mk II	India	GSLV	1	1	0	0	
H-IIA 202	Japan	H-IIA	2	2	0	0	
H-IIA 204	Japan	H-IIA	1	1	0	0	
H-IIB	Japan	H-IIB	1	1	0	0	
Long March 2D	China	Long March 2	4	4	0	0	
Long March 3B/E	China	Long March 3	7	7	0	0	
Long March 3B / YZ-1	China	Long March 3	1	1	0	0	Maiden flight
Long March 3C/E / YZ-1	China	Long March 3	1	1	0	0	Maiden flight
Long March 4B	China	Long March 4	2	2	0	0	
Long March 4C	China	Long March 4	2	2	0	0	
Long March 6	China	Long March 5	1	1	0	0	Maiden flight
Long March 11	China	Long March 11	1	1	0	0	Maiden flight
Proton-M / Blok DM-03	Russia	Proton	1	1	0	0	
Proton-M / Briz-M	Russia	Proton	7	6	1	0	
PSLV-CA	India	PSLV	1	1	0	0	
PSLV-XL	India	PSLV	3	3	0	0	
Rokot / Briz-KM	Russia	UR-100	2	2	0	0	
Safir-1B	Iran	Safir	1	1	0	0	
Soyuz-2.1a	Russia	Soyuz-2	4	3	1	0	
Soyuz-2.1b	Russia	Soyuz-2	1	1	0	0	
Soyuz-2.1b / Fregat-M	Russia	Soyuz-2	1	1	0	0	
Soyuz ST-B / Fregat-MT	Russia	Soyuz-2	3	3	0	0	
Soyuz-2-1v / Volga	Russia	Soyuz-2	1	0	0	1	
Soyuz-FG	Russia	Soyuz	4	4	0	0	
Soyuz-U	Russia	Soyuz	3	3	0	0	
Super Strypi	United States	Strypi	1	0	1	0	Maiden flight
Vega	Italy	Vega	3	3	0	0	
Zenit-3F	Ukraine	Zenit	1	1	0	0	

=== By spaceport ===
- Jiuquan
- Taiyuan
- Xichang
- Kourou
- Satish Dhawan
- Semnan
- Tanegashima
- Uchinoura
- Baikonur
- Dombarovsky
- Plesetsk
- Barking Sands
- Cape Canaveral
- Kennedy
- MARS
- Vandenberg

Site	Country	Launches	Successes	Failures	Partial failures	Remarks
Baikonur	Kazakhstan	18	16	2	0	
Barking Sands	United States	1	0	1	0	
Cape Canaveral	United States	17	16	1	0	
Dombarovsky	Russia	1	1	0	0	
Kourou	France	12	12	0	0	
Jiuquan	China	5	5	0	0	
Plesetsk	Russia	7	6	0	1	
Satish Dhawan	India	5	5	0	0	
Semnan	Iran	1	1	0	0	
Taiyuan	China	5	5	0	0	
Tanegashima	Japan	4	4	0	0	
Vandenberg	United States	2	2	0	0	
Xichang	China	9	9	0	0	
Total		87	82	4	1	

=== By orbit ===
- Transatmospheric
- Low Earth
- Low Earth (ISS)
- Low Earth (SSO)
- Low Earth (retrograde)
- Geosychronous
  (transfer)
- Medium Earth
- High Earth
- Heliocentric

Orbital regime	Launches	Achieved	Not achieved	Accidentally achieved	Remarks
Transatmospheric	1	1	0	0	
Low Earth	45	42	2	1	14 to ISS (1 launch failure, 1 failure post-separation)
Geosynchronous/transfer	32	31	1	0	
Medium Earth	7	7	0	0	
High Earth	2	2	0	0	
Total	87	83	3	1	

== Gallery ==
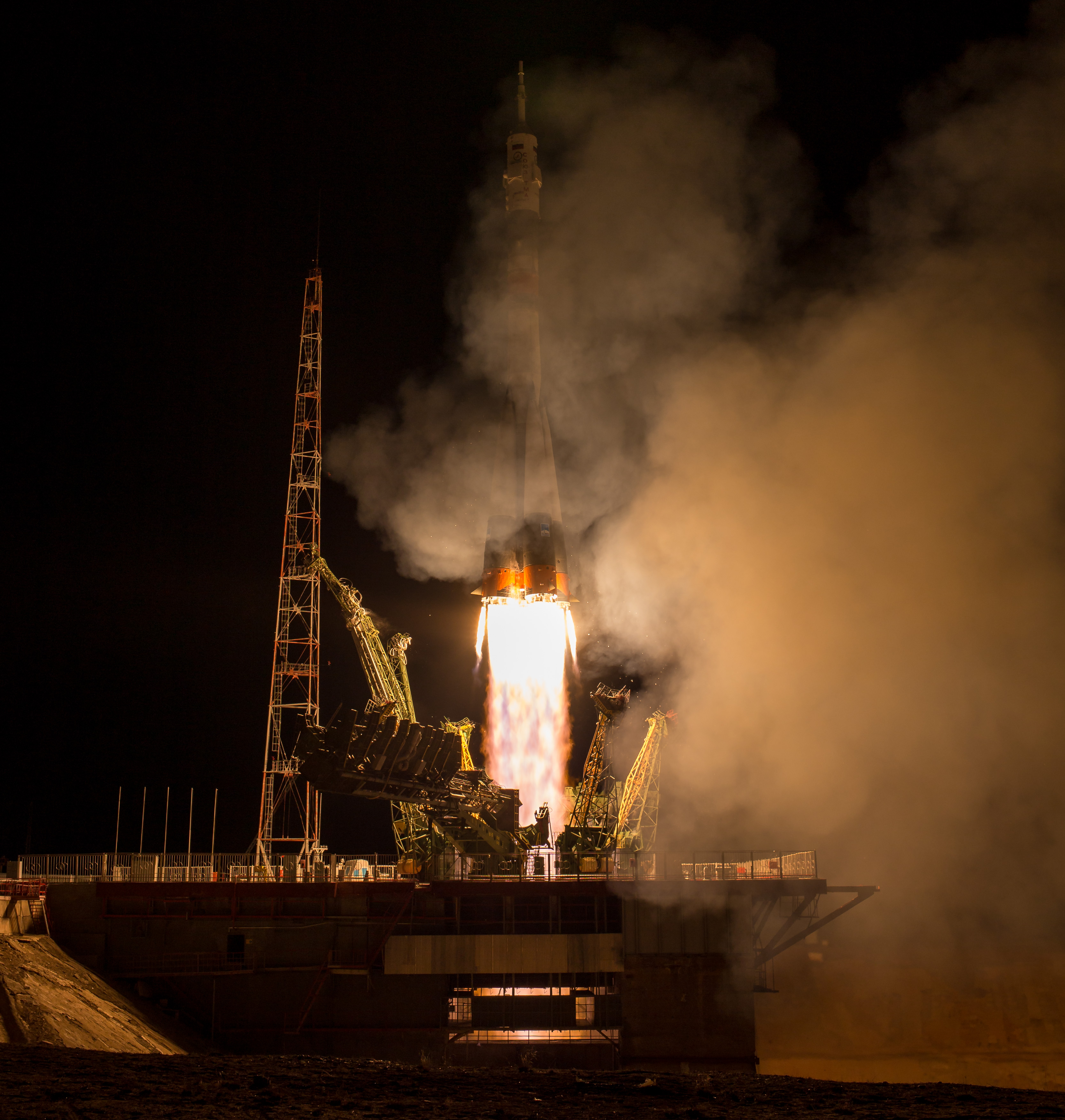
Soyuz TMA-16M launches carrying ISS year long mission crew members Scott Kelly and Mikhail Korniyenko and Soyuz commander Gennady Padalka.

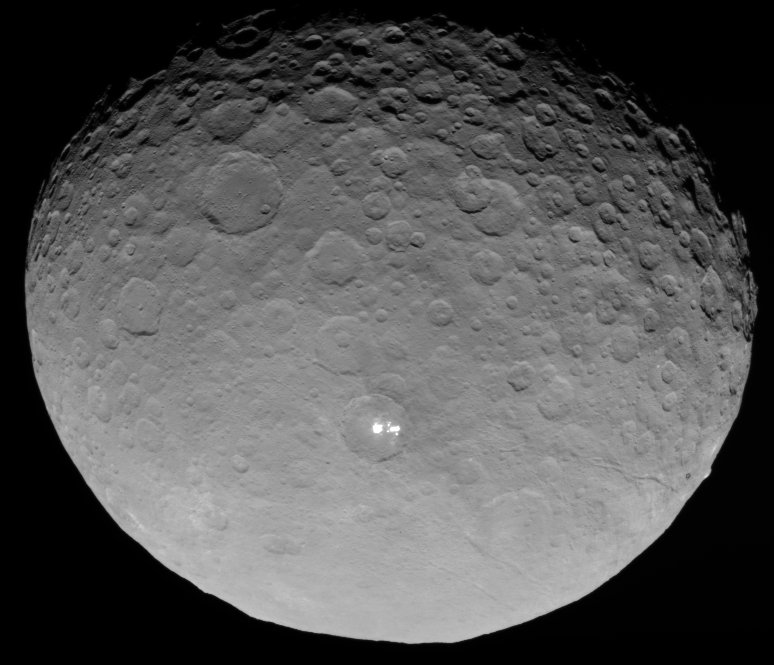
Photo of Ceres taken by the Dawn spacecraft at a distance of 13,600 km (8,500 mi).

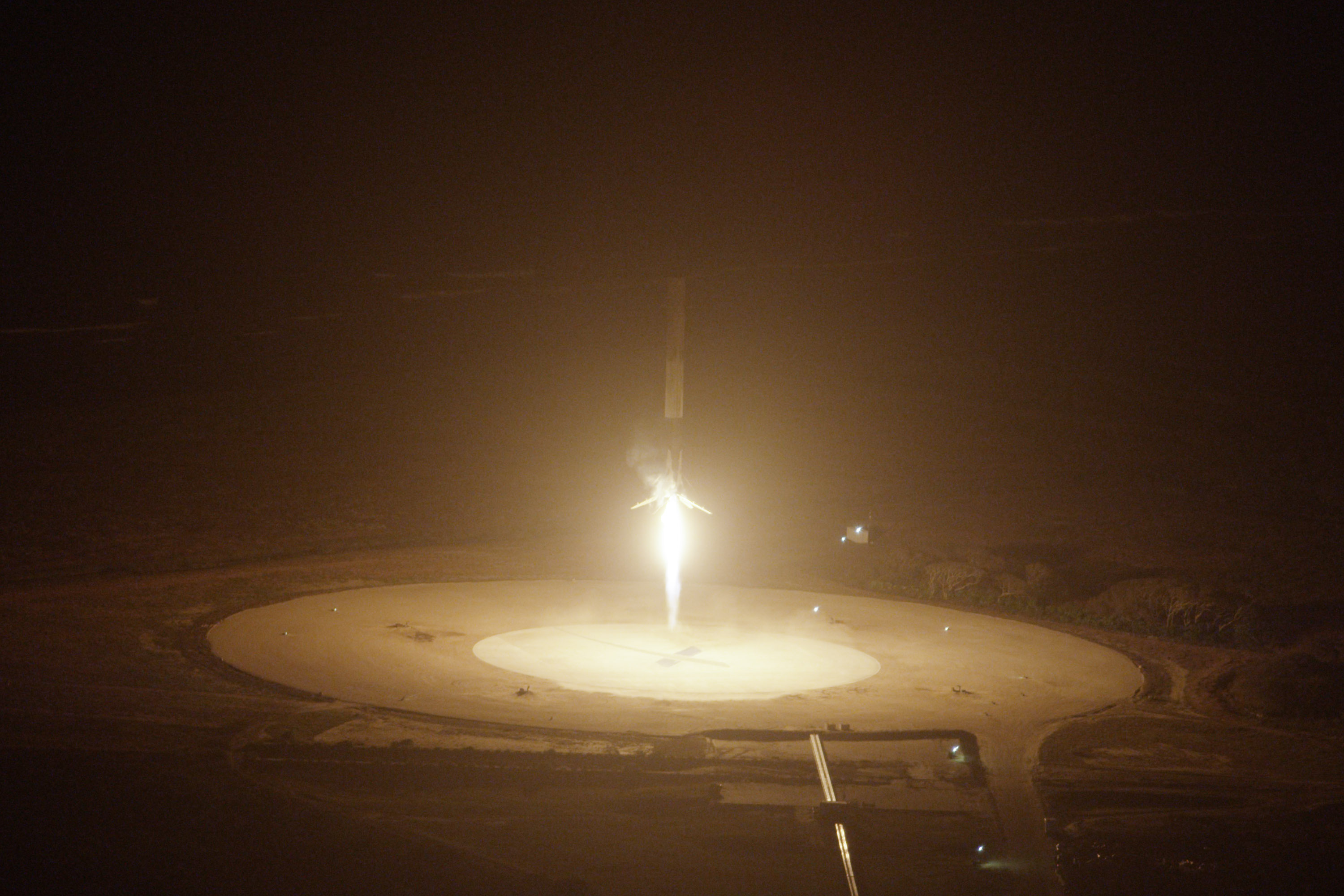
First stage of the Falcon 9 Flight 20 rocket immediately before touching down at Landing Zone 1.

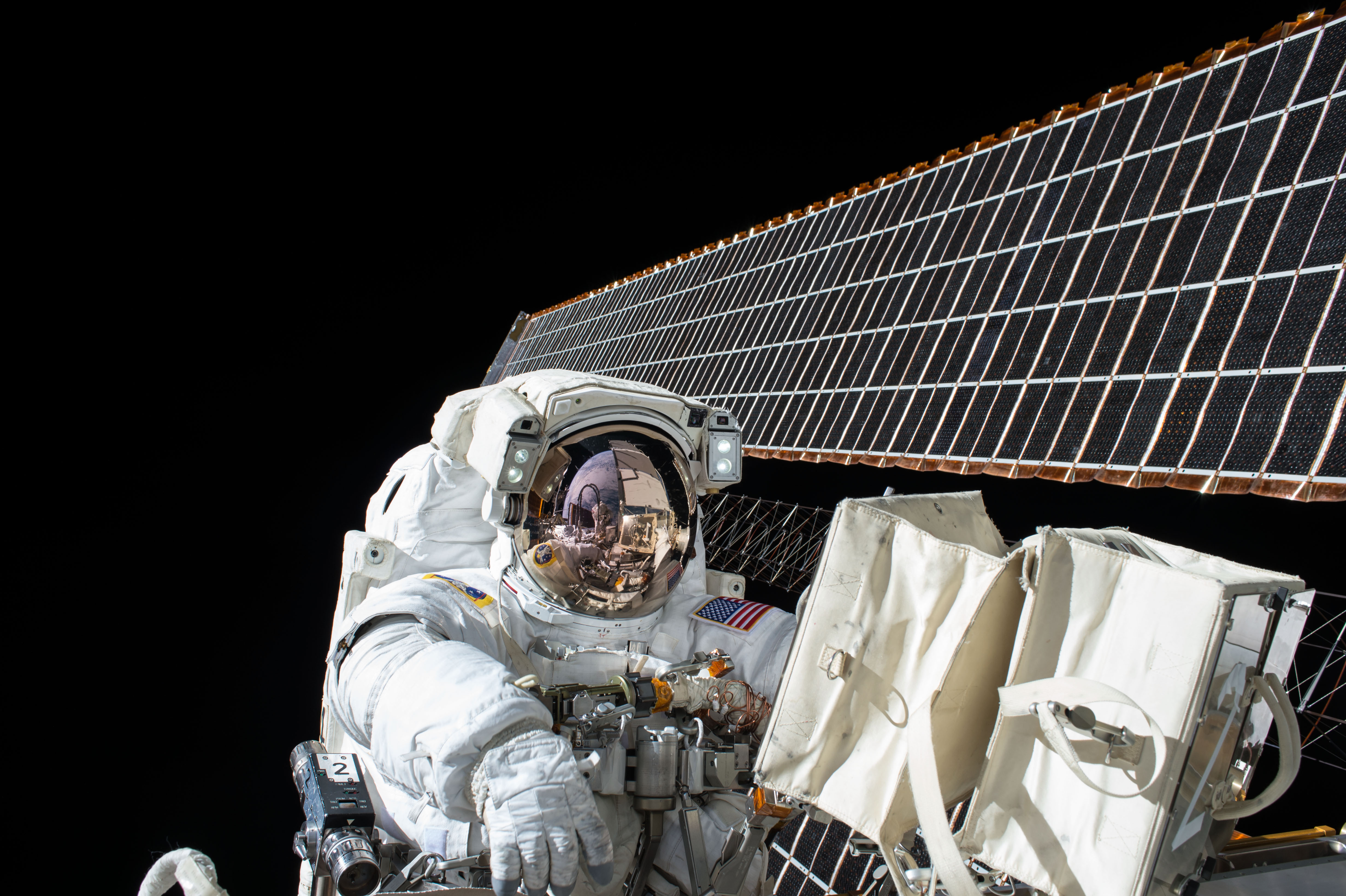
Scott Kelly working outside of the International Space Station
