= Progress M-26M =

Russian cargo spacecraft

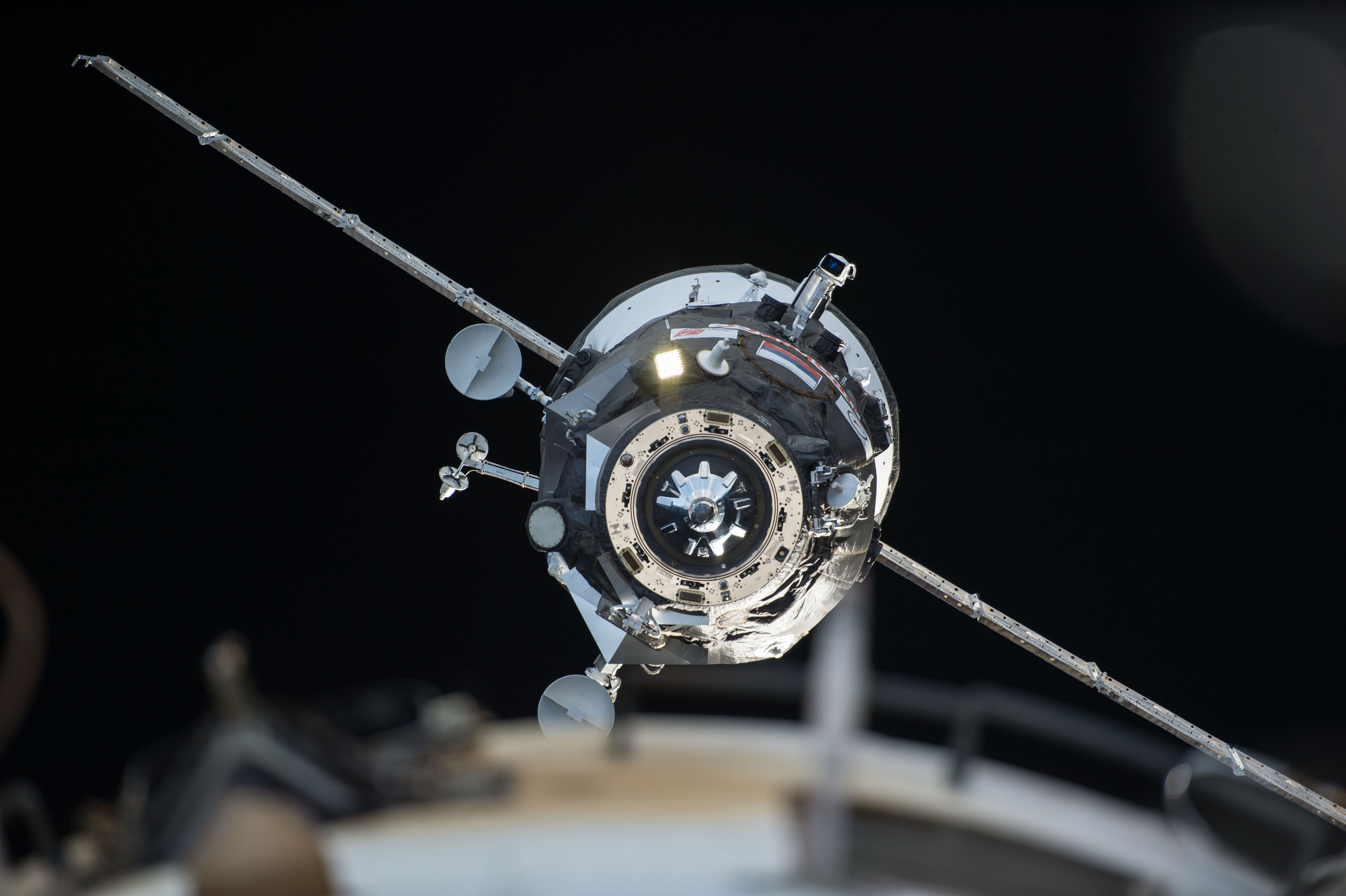
- Progress M-26M shortly before docking to the aft end of the Zvezda service module on the ISS.
- Mission type: ISS resupply
- Operator: Roskosmos
- COSPAR ID: 2015-008A
- SATCAT no.: 40392
- Mission duration: 178 days

Spacecraft properties
- Spacecraft type: Progress-M s/n 426
- Manufacturer: RKK Energia
- Launch mass: 7287 kg

Start of mission
- Launch date: 17 February 2015, 11:00:17 UTC
- Rocket: Soyuz-U
- Launch site: Baikonur, Site 1/5

End of mission
- Disposal: Deorbited
- Decay date: 14 August 2015, 14:17 UTC

Orbital parameters
- Reference system: Geocentric
- Regime: Low Earth
- Perigee altitude: 186 km
- Apogee altitude: 237 km
- Inclination: 51.65°
- Period: 88.73 minutes
- Epoch: 17 February 2015

Docking with ISS
- Docking port: Zvezda aft
- Docking date: 17 February 2015, 16:57 UTC
- Undocking date: 14 August 2015, 10:19 UTC
- Time docked: 177 days

Cargo
- Mass: 2370 kg
- Pressurised: 1465 kg
- Fuel: 435 kg
- Gaseous: 50 kg
- Water: 420 kg
- Progress ISS Resupply

Progress M-26M (Russian: Прогресс М-26М), identified by NASA as Progress 58P, is a Progress spacecraft used by Roskosmos to resupply the International Space Station (ISS) during 2015. Progress M-26M was launched on a six-hours rendezvous profile towards the ISS. The 26th Progress-M 11F615A60 spacecraft to be launched, it had the serial number 426 and was built by RKK Energia.

== Launch ==
The spacecraft was launched on 17 February 2015 at 11:00:17 UTC from the Baikonur Cosmodrome in Kazakhstan.

== Docking ==
Progress M-26M docked with the Zvezda service module on 17 February 2015 at 16:57 UTC, less than six hours after launch.

In May 2015, Progress was used to reboost the station. First try was automatically aborted by the craft one second into the burn. Russian flight controllers identified a problem in one of its eight thrusters. A second try with seven thrusters succeeded lasting 32 minutes and 3 seconds.

== Cargo ==
The Progress spacecraft carried 2370 kg of cargo and supplies to the International Space Station. The craft delivered food, fuel and supplies, including 435 kg of propellant, 50 kg of oxygen, 420 kg of water, and 1465 kg of spare parts, supplies and experiment hardware for the six members of the Expedition 42 crew. Progress M-26M remained docked to Zvezda for six months.

== See also ==
- 2015 in spaceflight
