= Edison Demonstration of Smallsat Networks =

Edison Demonstration of Smallsat Networks (EDSN) was a failed (launch failure) CubeSat constellation by NASA Ames, developed as a technology demonstration of satellite networking. The constellation would have consisted of 8 identical satellites. The satellites followed the CubeSat specifications for a 1.5U CubeSat.

EDSN was funded through the Small Spacecraft Technology Program (SSTP). Additionally, NASA Ames has partnered with NASA Marshall, Montana State University, and Santa Clara University. All 8 CubeSats were destroyed during a launch failure of the Super Strypi rocket on November 3, 2015.

== Mission ==
The eight identical spacecraft used absolute timing obtained from GPS satellites to maintain a schedule. Each day, one satellite would have acted as a Captain and the rest would have acted as Lieutenants. Each spacecraft was able to act as a Captain, and the role of Captain would have rotated through the constellation each 25-hour period. Lieutenants would only communicate with the Captain, and the Captain would have been responsible for downlinking to an Earth station.

=== Lifetime ===
NASA had estimated a 60-day mission lifetime, at which time the satellites would have drifted apart beyond the 100–120 km estimated range of the cross link and would have no longer been able to network.

=== Orbit ===
The constellation was planned for a 500 km altitude.

== Design ==
EDSN was using Triangular Advanced Solar Cells (TASC) for power generation. Intersatellite communications would have been on UHF via a tapespring antenna. Ground communications would have been via an S-band patch antenna. The spacecraft would have used magnetometers and gyroscopes as attitude determination instruments and reaction wheels and torque coils for attitude control.

Cross link would have occurred via the UHF transceiver and on a UHF monopole with an estimated maximum range of 100–120 km. The link would have been initiated when the captain pings the specific Lieutenant's ID. The specified Lieutenant would have then responded with data to be downlinked. Downlink would have occurred on S-Band between the current captain and ground station.

The flight computer was a Samsung Nexus S smartphone.

== See also ==
- 2015 in spaceflight
