= AESP-14 =

Brazilian cubesat

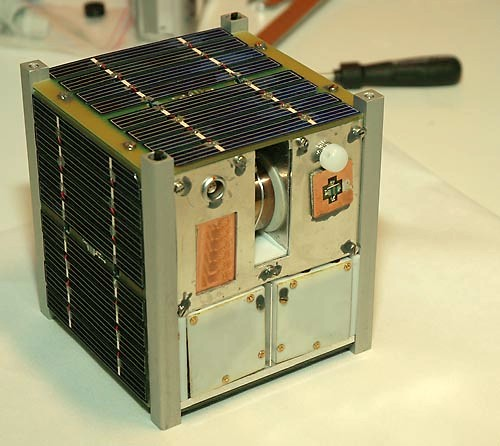
- An 1U cubesat similar to the AESP-14 satellite.
- Mission type: Ionospheric research
- Operator: ITA
- COSPAR ID: 1998-067FM
- SATCAT no.: 40389
- Website: www.aer.ita.br

Spacecraft properties
- Manufacturer: ITA
- Launch mass: 1 kilogram (2.2 lb)
- Dimensions: 10 cm × 10 cm × 10 cm (3.9 in × 3.9 in × 3.9 in)

Start of mission
- Launch date: 10 January 2015, 09:47:10 UTC
- Rocket: Falcon 9 v1.1
- Launch site: Cape Canaveral SLC-40
- Contractor: SpaceX
- Deployed from: Japanese Experiment Module (JEM) Small Satellite Orbital Deployer
- Deployment date: 5 February 2015
- Entered service: 5 February 2015, 12:50 UTC

End of mission
- Decay date: 11 May 2015

AESP-14 is a Brazilian 1U Cubesat developed by multiple Brazilian institutions. It was launched on 10 January 2015 aboard the SpaceX CRS-5 mission on a Falcon 9 v1.1 rocket. It was the first Brazilian Cubesat ever launched into space.

On 5 February, the satellite was deployed from the International Space Station using the Japanese Experiment Module (JEM) Small Satellite Orbital Deployer, but an unknown malfunction caused it to be unable to transmit any data back to Earth. The satellite reentered the atmosphere on 11 May 2015.

== Launch ==
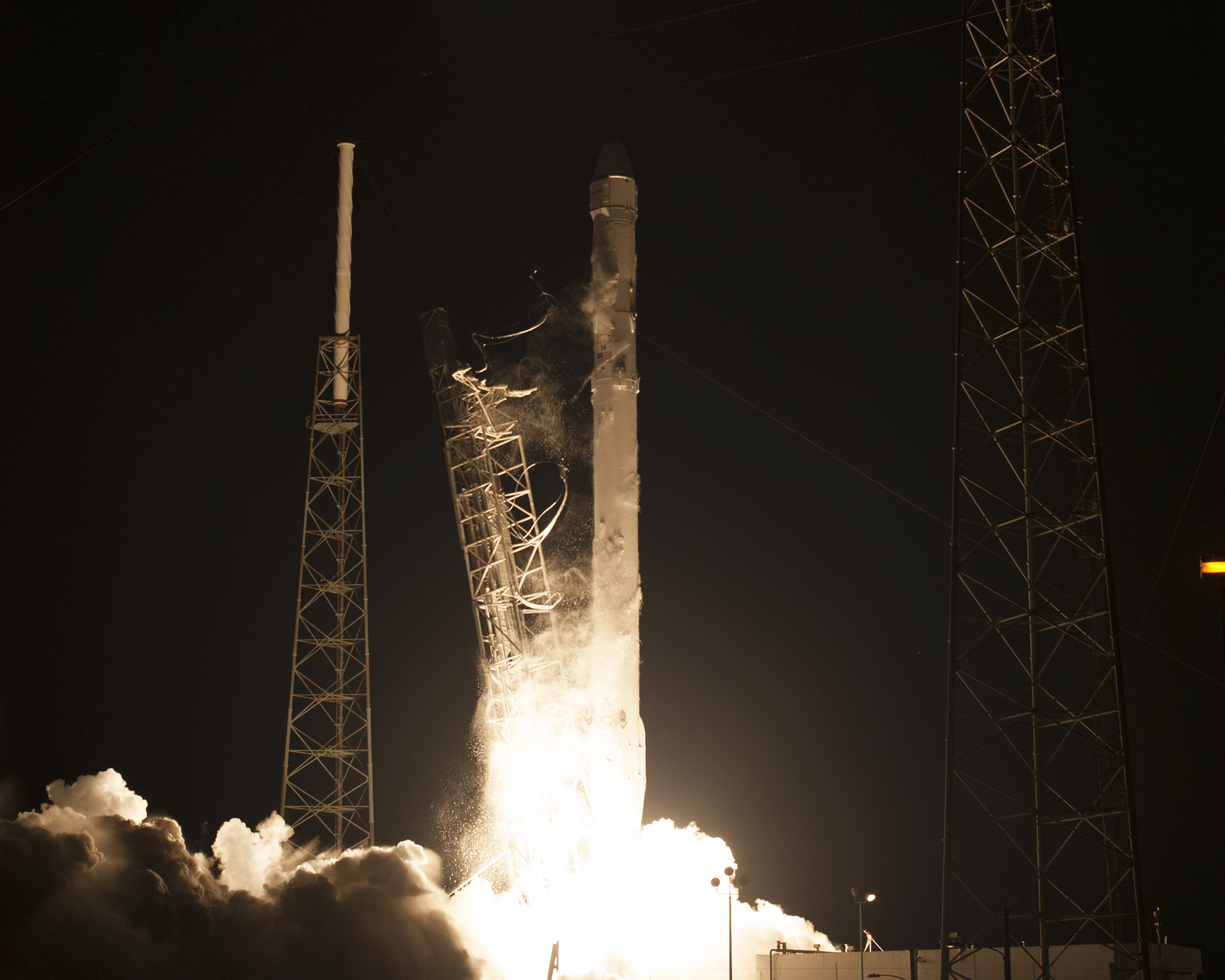
Launch of the Falcon 9 rocket carrying CRS-5

The launch of the CRS-5 mission, as well as AESP-14, was postponed three times from 16 December 2014 to 10 January 2015. The launch successfully occurred on 10 January 2015.

== Failure ==
The first nanosatellite developed and built entirely in Brazil, after a month in orbit, was declared by the Brazilian Space Agency (AEB) on March 4, 2015, to be inoperative due to a failure in the opening system of a transmission antenna.

The AESP-14, launched from the International Space Station on February 5 of the same year, should have started up its antenna 30 minutes after launch, a necessary procedure for sending data to Earth. The equipment, however, did not work. Technicians from the ITA, responsible for the operation, tried several methods to reverse the antenna problem, without success, until the battery of the nanosatellite ended, 15 days after entering orbit.

== See also ==
- 2015 in spaceflight
