= Progress M-28M =

International Space Station resupply mission

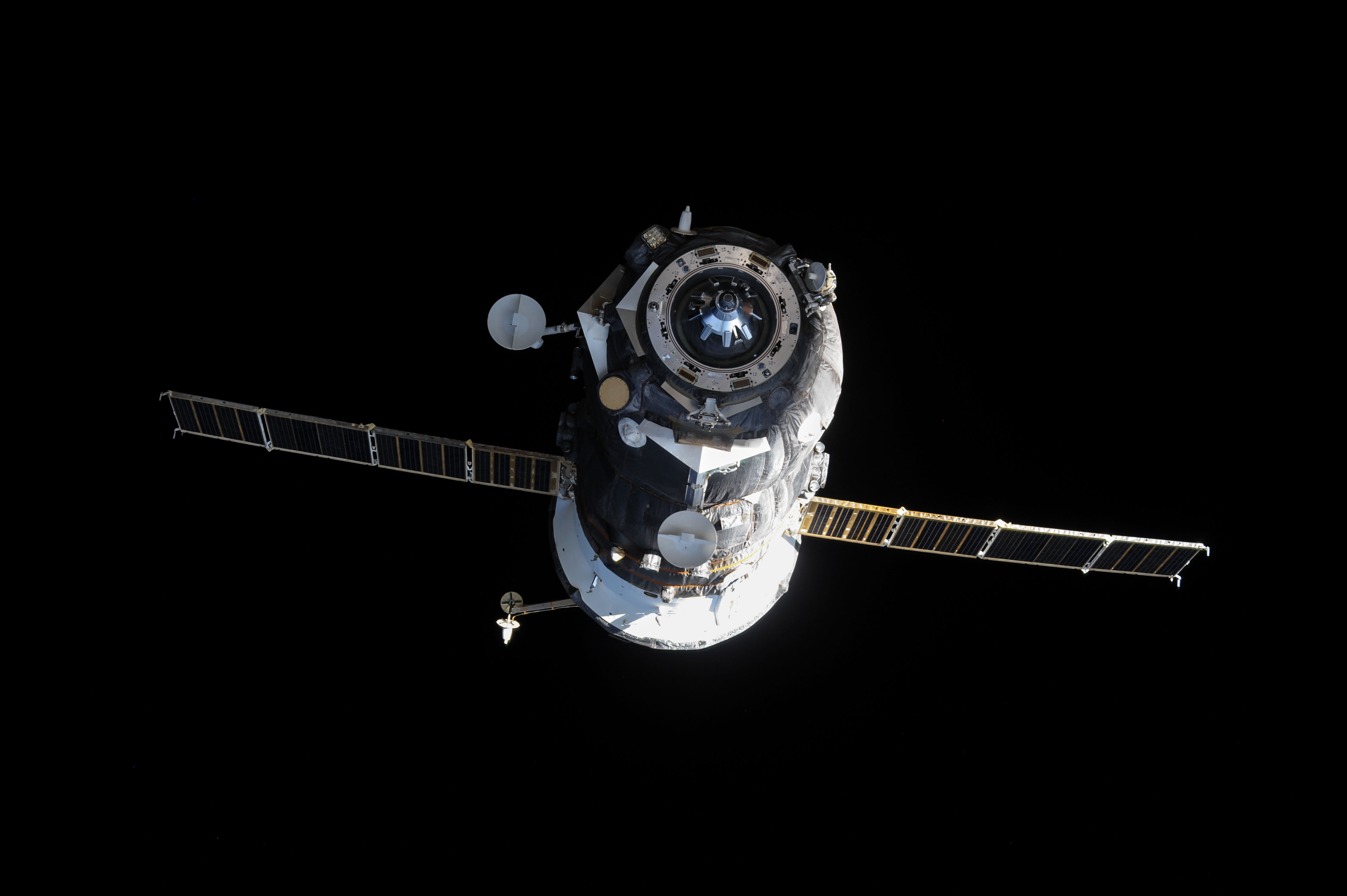
- Progress M-28M shortly after undocking from the ISS on 19 December 2015.
- Mission type: International Space Station resupply
- Operator: Roscosmos
- COSPAR ID: 2015-031A
- SATCAT no.: 40713
- Mission duration: 169 days

Spacecraft properties
- Spacecraft type: Progress-M s/n 428
- Manufacturer: RKK Energia
- Launch mass: 7282 kg

Start of mission
- Launch date: 3 July 2015, 04:55:48 UTC
- Rocket: Soyuz-U
- Launch site: Baikonur Site 1/5

End of mission
- Disposal: Deorbited
- Decay date: 19 December 2015, 11:28 UTC

Orbital parameters
- Reference system: Geocentric
- Regime: Low Earth
- Perigee altitude: 263 km
- Apogee altitude: 289 km
- Inclination: 51.65°
- Period: 90.03 minutes
- Epoch: 3 July 2015

Docking with ISS
- Docking port: Pirs
- Docking date: 5 July 2015, 07:11 UTC
- Undocking date: 19 December 2015, 07:35 UTC
- Time docked: 167 days

Cargo
- Mass: 2381 kg
- Pressurised: 1393 kg
- Fuel: 520 kg
- Gaseous: 48 kg
- Water: 420 kg
- Progress ISS Resupply

Progress M-28M (Russian: Прогресс М-28М), identified by NASA as Progress 60P was a Progress spacecraft used by Roskosmos to resupply the International Space Station (ISS) during 2015. It was launched on 3 July 2015, less than a week following the failure of SpaceX CRS-7 and the previous failure of Progress M-27M to deliver cargo to the ISS. The 28th Progress-M 11F615A60 spacecraft launched has the serial number 428 and was built by RKK Energia.

== Launch ==
The spacecraft was launched on 3 July 2015 at 04:55 UTC from the Baikonur Cosmodrome in Kazakhstan.

== Docking ==
Progress M-28M docked with the Pirs docking compartment on 5 July 2015 at 07:11 UTC. The spacecraft undocked from the station on 19 December 2015 at 07:35 UTC.

== Cargo ==
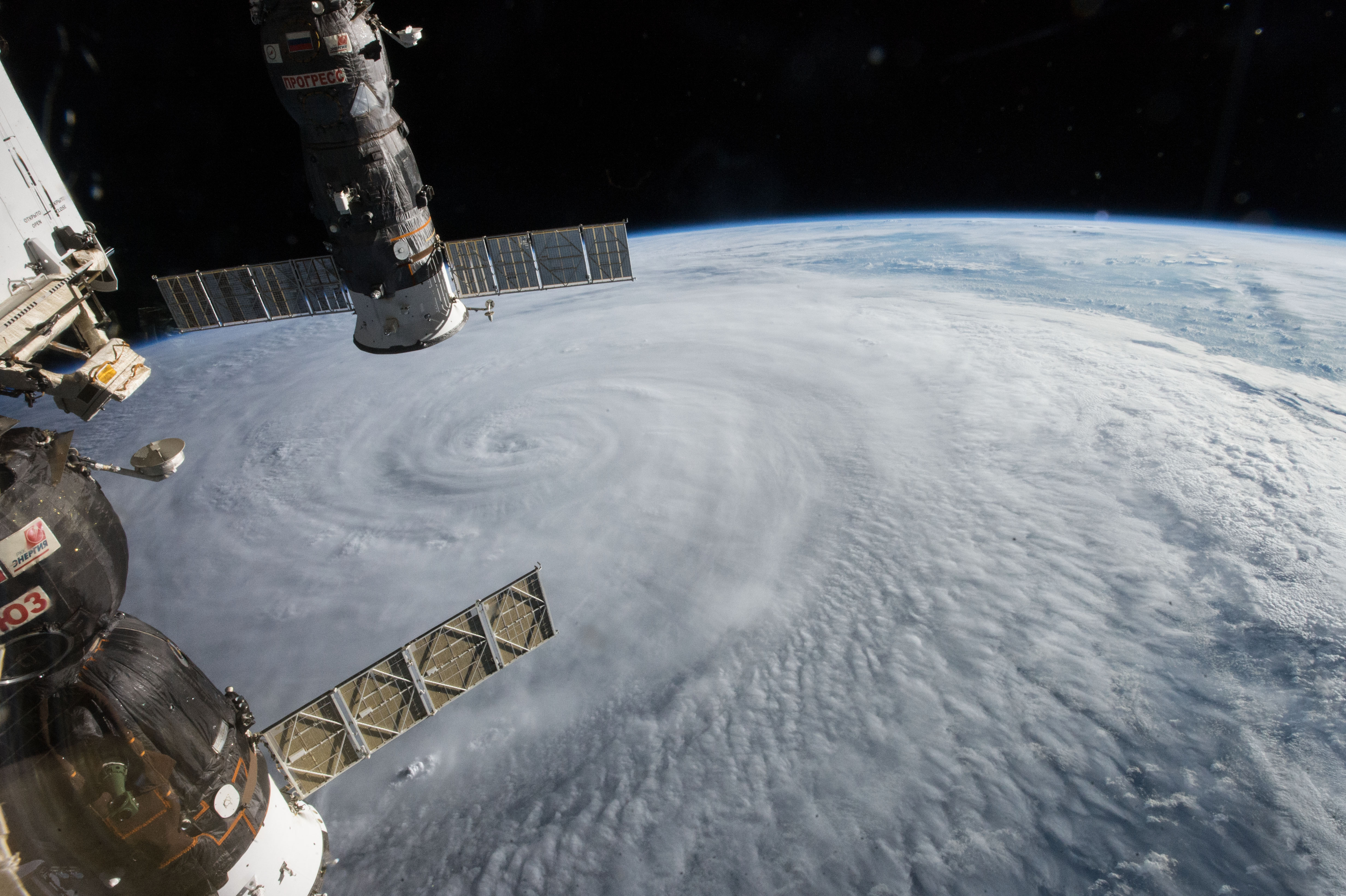
The typhoon Soudelor photographed from the ISS on 5 August 2015 while the storm was in the western Pacific. The Soyuz TMA-17M (bottom left) and the Progress M-28M (top left) are visible.

The Progress spacecraft carries 2381 kg of cargo and supplies to the International Space Station. The craft is delivering food, fuel and supplies, including 520 kg of propellant, 48 kg of oxygen and air, 420 kg of water, and 1393 kg of spare parts, supplies and experiment hardware for the six members of the Expedition 44 crew. Progress M-28M is scheduled to remain docked to Pirs for about four months.

== See also ==
- 2015 in spaceflight
