= NovaWurks =

American spacecraft startup company

NovaWurks, Inc.
- Founded: December 2011
- Founder: Talbot Jaeger
- Headquarters: Los Alamitos, California, United States
- Products: Spacecraft
- Services: Rapid Prototyping; Engineering Solutions; Space-Based Imaging
- Parent: NovaWurks, Inc.
- Website: www.novawurks.com

NovaWurks is a seed-stage startup company that is developing a set of novel small satellite technologies that will enable new capabilities for commercial operations in space. NovaWurks is located in Los Alamitos, California. In 2013, the company received an important contract worth up to US$46,200,000 from DARPA for components for the Phoenix Project.

The company's products both enable, and are enabled by, the more recent lower-cost access to space epitomized by NewSpace launch companies such as SpaceX.

== Phoenix project ==
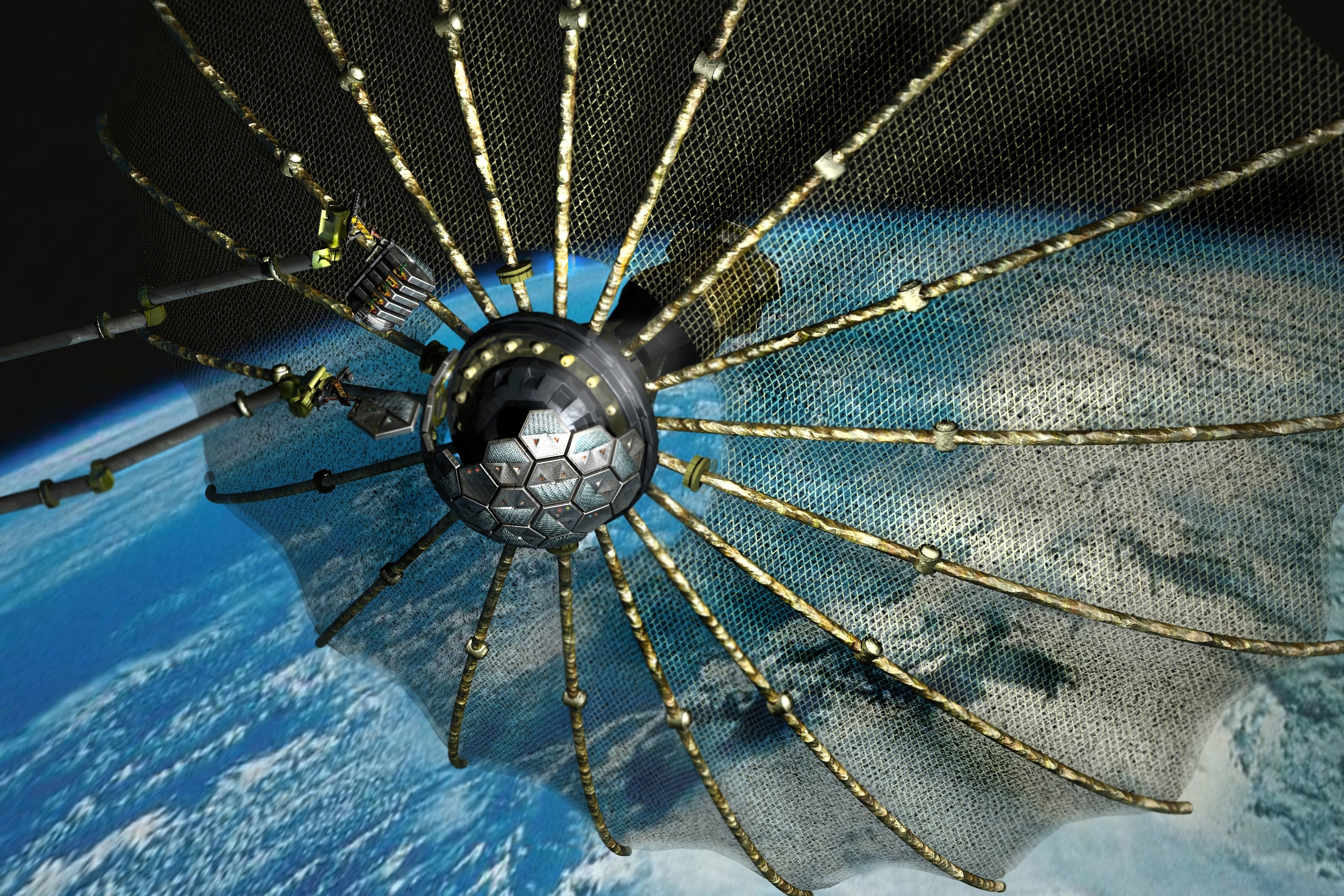
An artist's concept of DARPA's Phoenix harvesting and repurposing communications equipment.

In July 2012, NovaWurks won a contract with DARPA to build a hyper-integrated satlet for the DARPA Phoenix project. The contract value was US$2,800,000

DARPA's Phoenix project aims to create a system to harvest valuable components such as power supplies or antennas from old, non-functioning satellites using an advanced robotic arm and tagged with a small transponder. These parts are then delivered to the new satellite and attached. The Phoenix project opens up a plethora of new options for future satellites, as a lighter, incomplete satellite can be sent into orbit and finished in space with parts from non-functioning satellites.

In October 2013, NovaWurks was awarded a US$30,800,000 Phase 2 contract for the DARPA Phoenix project with an additional US$11,800,000 in options that, if used, would raise the total amount to US$46,200,000. The Phase 2 effort objective is to have "flight hardware assembled, qualified and integrated into the [Phoenix] Servicer/Tender prior to environmental test and ready for launch" by the end of 2015.

The SIMPL (“Satlet Initial-Mission Proofs and Lessons”) experiment was the first HISat-based experiment funded by NovaWurks and launched aboard the Orbital ATK Cygnus (spacecraft) resupply mission to the International Space Station which docked at ISS on December 9, 2015. The SIMPL experiment marked the first time NovaWurks has sent into space the company's flagship technology. Orbital ATK's Cygnus was successfully grappled by the ISS's robotic arm and then attached to the orbital outpost to begin the transfer of the SIMPL components onto the ISS. In a press release dated Dec. 17, 2015 CTO and Founder Talbot Jaeger explained the significance of the SIMPL experiment saying “SIMPL consists of eight fundamental pieces, six HISats and two solar arrays. The entire satellite will be assembled on board the ISS and then be deployed as a fully operational, newly built spacecraft. It will be another first for the space industry.”

SIMPL is the first instance where satellites will be assembled in space using smaller components, delivered in large groups and assembled on the International Space Station and then deployed from the NanoRacks Microsat Deployer. This paradigm shift to traditional satellite deployment alters the accepted practice of single large satellites launching on their own dedicated rockets. The NanoRacks-NovaWurks-SIMPL-Micrsosat mission proves the HISat technology on orbit, will reduce risk for follow on HISat-capable missions, and enables commercial utilization of the cellularized technology developed by NovaWurks Inc. for payloads utilizing either ISS or expendable launch vehicle (ELV) access to space.
