= SPARK (rocket) =

American expendable launch system

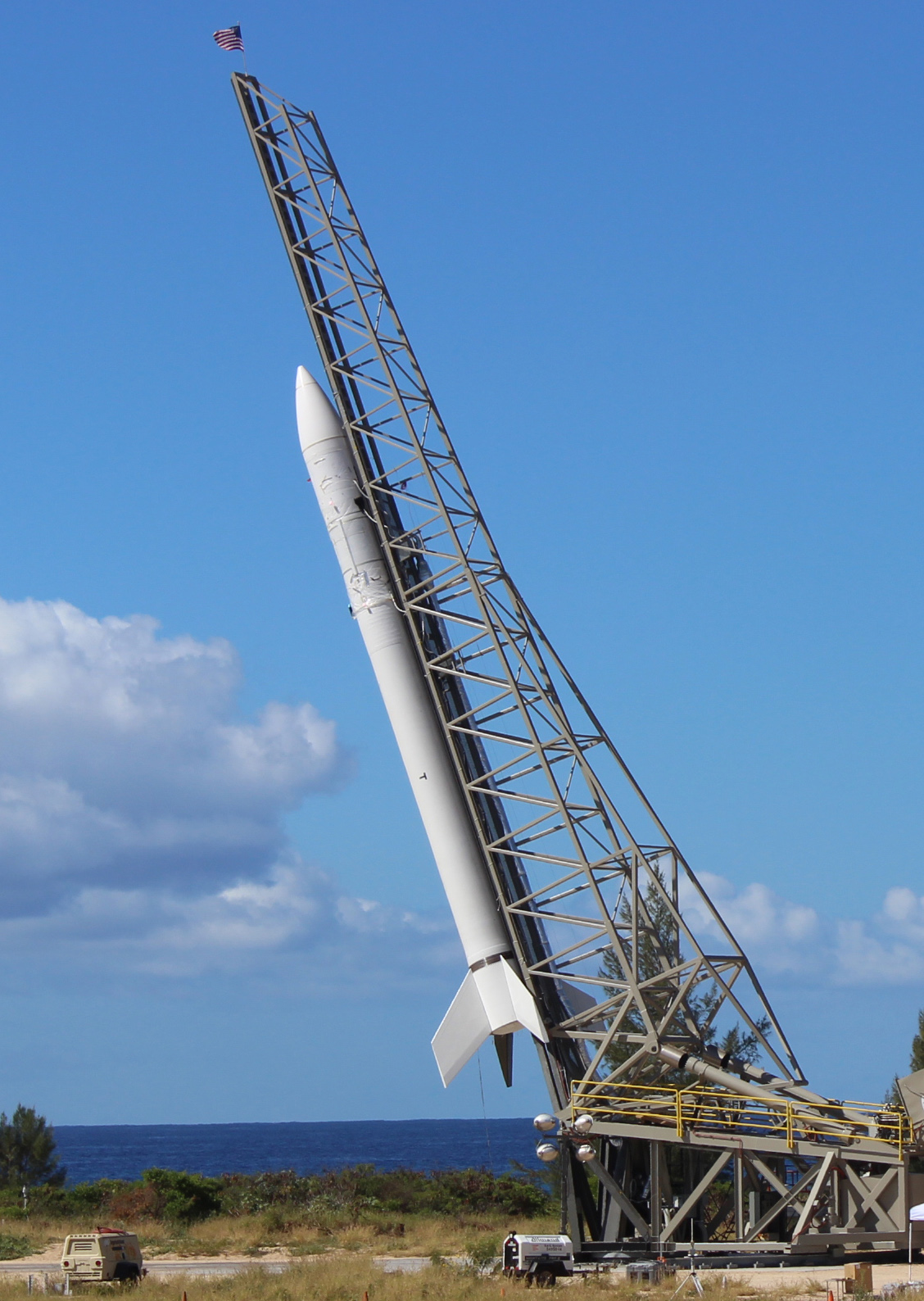
- SPARK (Super Strypi) rocket on the launch pad
- Function: Expendable launch system
- Manufacturer: University of Hawaii; Aerojet Rocketdyne; Sandia
- Country of origin: United States

Size
- Height: 17 m (56 ft)
- Diameter: 1.5 m (4 ft 11 in)
- Mass: 28,240 kg (62,260 lb)
- Stages: 3

Capacity

Payload to 400 km SSO
- Mass: 250 kilograms (550 lb)

Associated rockets
- Family: Strypi

Launch history
- Status: Retired
- Launch sites: Barking Sands
- Total launches: 1
- Success(es): 0
- Failure: 1
- First flight: 3 November 2015
- Last flight: 3 November 2015

SPARK, or Spaceborne Payload Assist Rocket - Kauai, also known as Super Strypi, is an American expendable launch system developed by the University of Hawaii, Sandia and Aerojet Rocketdyne. Designed to place miniaturized satellites into low Earth and Sun-synchronous orbits, it is a derivative of the Strypi rocket which was developed in the 1960s in support of nuclear weapons testing. SPARK is being developed under the Low Earth Orbiting Nanosatellite Integrated Defense Autonomous System (LEONIDAS) program, funded by the Operationally Responsive Space Office of the United States Department of Defense.

== Configuration ==
SPARK is designed as a three-stage all-solid carrier rocket, with a spin-stabilized first stage known as LEO-46 and an active attitude control system on the second and third stages. It is launched using a new rail-guided system. It is expected to have a payload capacity of 250 kilograms (550 lb) to a Sun-synchronous orbit at an altitude of approximately 400 kilometres (250 mi). Launches will be conducted from the Pacific Missile Range Facility at Barking Sands. Aerojet Rocketdyne will produce the motors for all three stages and Sandia is the prime contractor for the rocket's systems. The United States Air Force has provided launch support.

== History ==
=== ORS-4 ===
The first launch of SPARK, named ORS-4, took place on November 3, 2015 and was carrying HiakaSat (formerly called HawaiiSat-1) and several secondary payloads, including the Edison Demonstration of Smallsat Networks. The mission was supposed to test the rocket at its full payload capacity. However, telemetry showed the rocket tumbling soon after liftoff, and the U.S. Air Force released a statement, saying that the "experimental Super Strypi launch vehicle failed in mid-flight shortly after liftoff".
