= Kjell N. Lindgren =

American astronaut (born 1973)

Kjell Lindgren
- 林琪兒
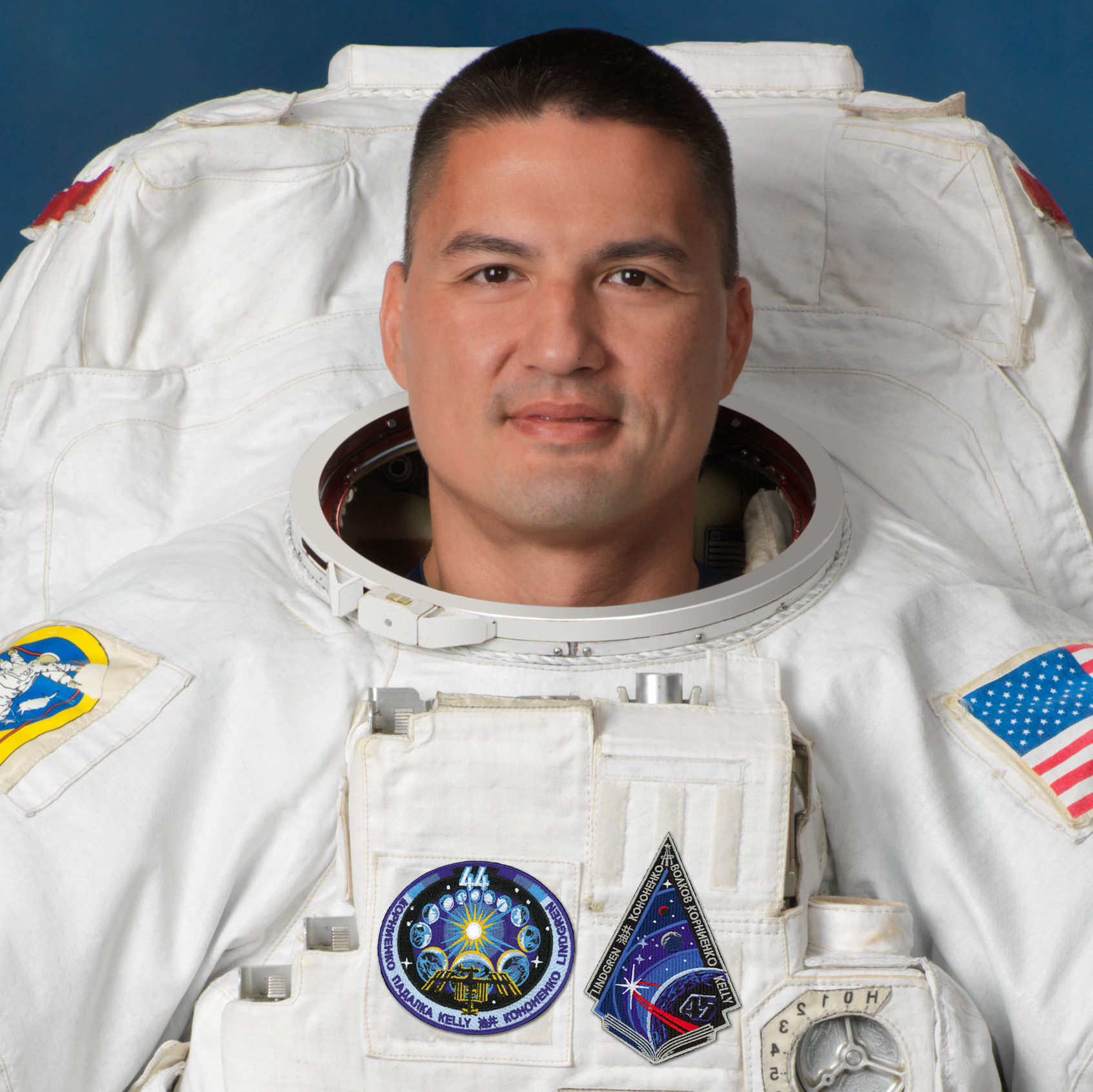
- Official portrait, 2014
- Born: Kjell Norwood Lindgren; January 23, 1973 (age 53); Taipei, Taiwan
- Education: United States Air Force Academy (BS); Colorado State University (MS); University of Colorado School of Medicine (MD); University of Minnesota (MS); University of Texas, Galveston (MPH)
- Space career

NASA astronaut
- Time in space: 312d 5h 11m
- Selection: NASA Group 20 (2009)
- Total EVAs: 2
- Total EVA time: 15h 4m
- Mission: Soyuz TMA-17M (Expedition 44/45); SpaceX Crew-4 (Expedition 67/68)
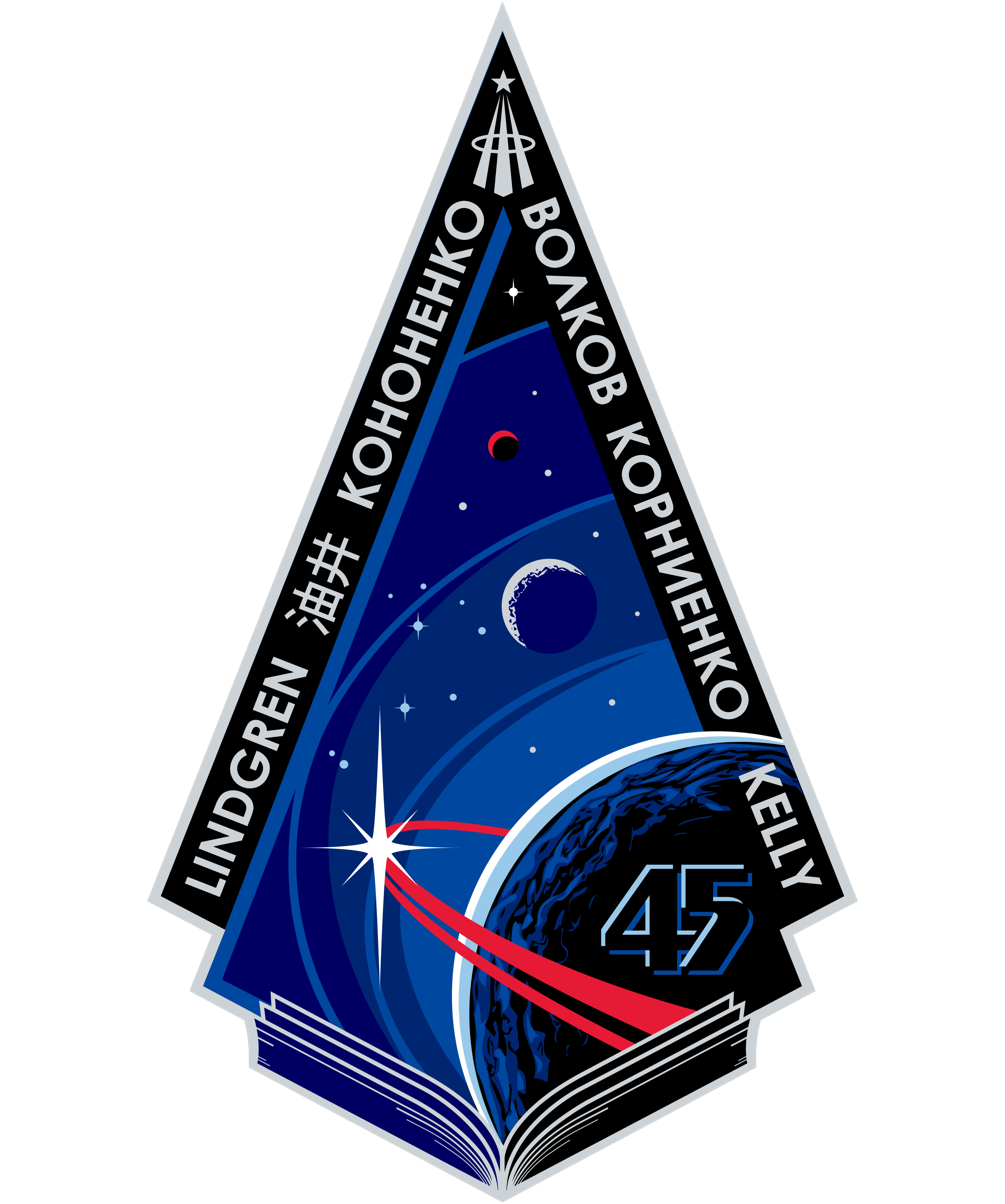
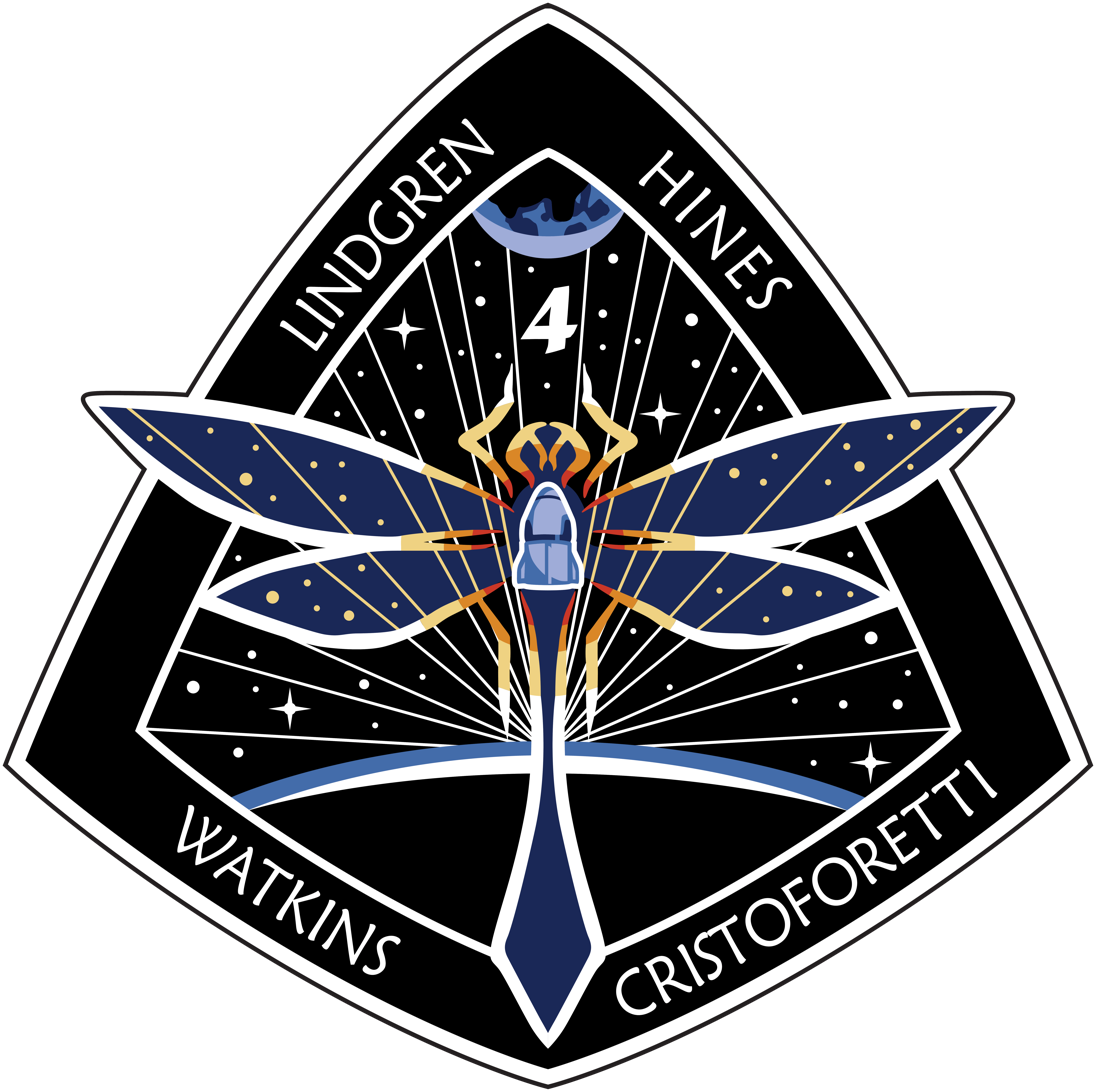
- Mission insignia

Kjell Norwood Lindgren (Chinese: 林琪兒; pinyin: Lín Qí'ér; born January 23, 1973) is an American astronaut who was selected in June 2009 as a member of the NASA Astronaut Group 20. He launched to the International Space Station (ISS) as part of Expedition 44/45 on July 22, 2015.

== Early life and education ==
Lindgren was born in Taipei, Taiwan, in 1973 to a Taiwanese mother and American father in the US Air Force; his Chinese name is Lin Qi'er (Chinese: 林琪兒; pinyin: Lín Qí'ér). His family lived in Taichung for over two years, and later moved to the Midwestern United States, but he spent most of his childhood in England. He attended Lakenheath American High School for a year before moving back to the United States, where he graduated from James W. Robinson Secondary School in Fairfax, Virginia in 1991.

After entering the United States Air Force Academy, he joined the Air Force Parachuting Team. In 1995, he received a Bachelor of Science (BS) degree in biology with a minor in Mandarin Chinese from the Air Force Academy. In 1996, he received a Master of Science (MS) degree in cardiovascular physiology from Colorado State University (CSU), in part for his work completing cardiovascular countermeasure research at NASA's Space Physiology Lab. He subsequently obtained a Doctorate of Medicine (MD) from the University of Colorado School of Medicine in 2002, and went on to complete a three-year residency in emergency medicine at Hennepin County Medical Center in Minneapolis. In 2006, he completed a post-doctoral fellowship and a Master of Health Informatics (MHI) at the University of Minnesota. He also completed a Master of Public Health (MPH) at the University of Texas Medical Branch in 2007 and a residency in aerospace medicine in 2008.

== NASA career ==
He began working for NASA at the Johnson Space Center in 2007. He went on to support ISS training operation at Star City, Russia and became the deputy crew surgeon for STS-130 and Expedition 24.

In June 2009, he was one of nine astronaut candidates selected by NASA out of 3500 applications and began training as part of NASA Astronaut Group 20. The nine Americans, as well as two Canadian Space Agency candidates and three JAXA candidates, started training at the Johnson Space Center in August 2009. The 14 candidates carried trained in various different fields including T-38 flight training, Extravehicular activity training, survival, International Space Station operations and other various skills. The group completed their training and Lindgren and his 13 classmates became eligible for future flight assignments on November 4, 2011.

In between finishing training, he worked in the Spacecraft Communicator and Extravehicular Activity branches of NASA, and he was the Spacecraft Communicator lead for Expedition 30.

From June 18, 2017, to June 27, 2017, Lindgren was commander of the NEEMO 22 mission to the Aquarius Reef Base, located 19 meters underwater off the coast of Florida. The NEEMO 22 mission focused on both exploration spacewalks and objectives related to the International Space Station and deep space missions. As an analogue for future planetary science concepts and strategies, the mission's crew also performed marine science under the guidance of Florida International University's marine science department. Objectives for the crew also included testing spaceflight countermeasure equipment, technology for precisely tracking equipment in habitat and studies of body composition and sleep. The crew also assessed hardware sponsored by ESA that will help crew members evacuate someone who has been injured on a future lunar spacewalk.

=== Expedition 44/45 ===
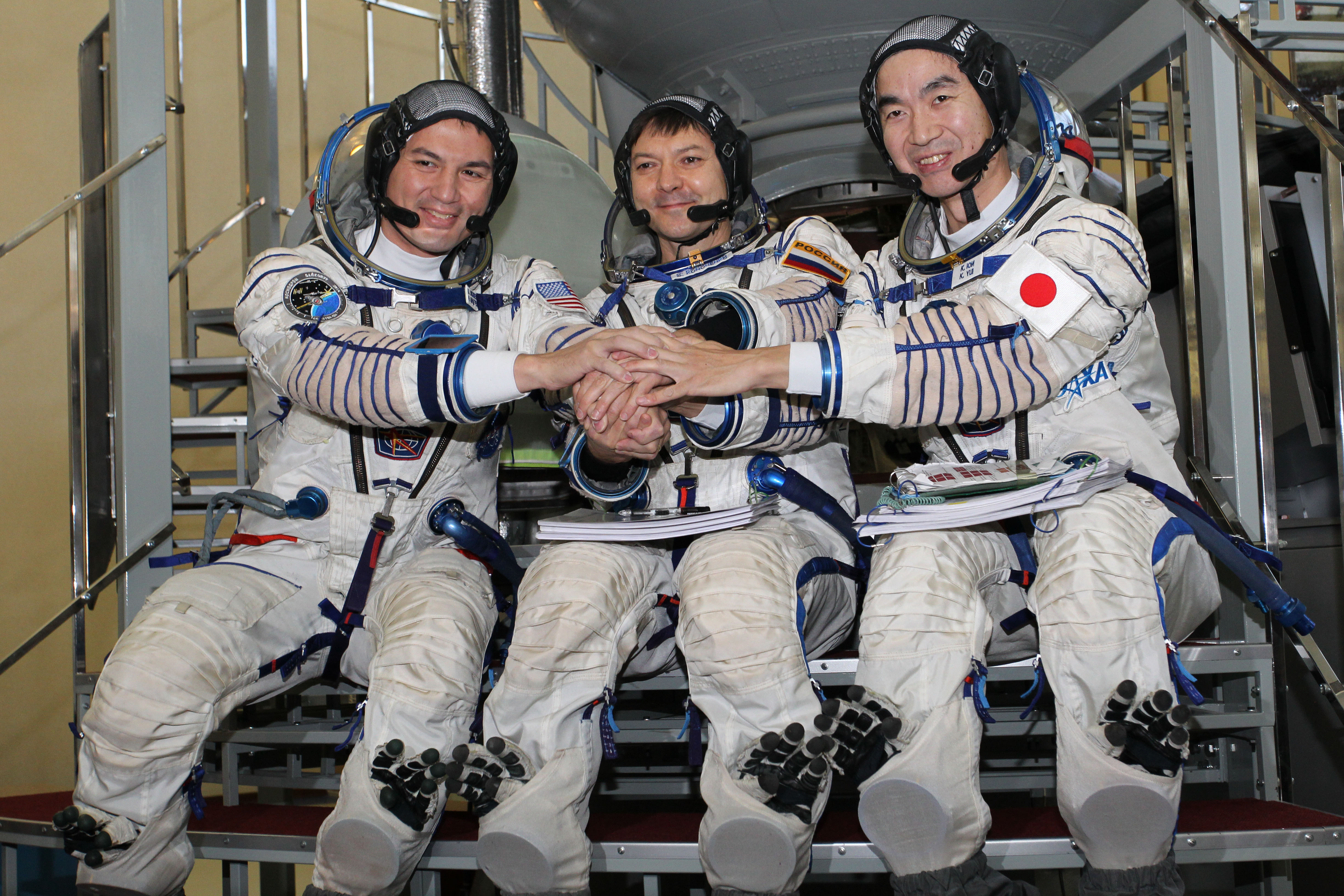
Lindgren (left) alongside crewmates Oleg Kononenko and Kimya Yui (right)

In 2013, he began training at the Gagarin Space Center and was assigned as backup flight engineer for Expedition 42/43 which launched on Soyuz TMA-15M. He was later assigned to Expedition 44/45 as a flight engineer. On July 22, 2015, Lindgren launched on his first mission to the ISS alongside Russian cosmonaut Oleg Kononenko and Japanese astronaut Kimiya Yui onboard Soyuz TMA-17M. Six hours later the trio docked to the ISS, officially joining Expedition 44 alongside Soyuz TMA-16M crewmembers Gennady Padalka and Mikhail Kornienko of Roscosmos and Scott Kelly of NASA. In November 2015, while on the ISS, Kjell played a set of bagpipes manufactured by McCallum Bagpipes Ltd as a memorial to Victor Hurst, who died in October of that year. McCallum Bagpipes was chosen to manufacture the bagpipes because they make them in plastic, which is easily sanitized and transported, ideal for space exploration. This is thought to be the first time the Great Highland bagpipes have been played in space.

Towards the end of Expedition 44, Soyuz TMA-18M docked with the ISS carrying Russian cosmonaut Sergey Volkov, ESA astronaut Andreas Mogensen and KazCosmos cosmonaut Aidyn Aimbetov. This was unusual as it occurred before the departure of Soyuz TMA-16M, meaning there was a small period where nine people were on board the ISS. This was done in order to allow Kelly and Kornienko to remain on board the ISS for a full year, Soyuz TMA-16M landed with Paldlka, Mogensen and Aimbetov nine days after the launch of Soyuz TMA-18M, returning the ISS to normal six crew operations.

On October 28, 2015, Lindgren ventured outside of the ISS with Scott Kelly for his first spacewalk, the two spacewalkers completed several tasks including changing an insulating unit on one of the station's Main Bus Switching Units (MBSU), carried out some maintenance on one of Canadarm-2's Latching End Effector's and prepared both of the station's "open" Pressurized Mating Adapters ahead of the installation of two International Docking Adapters. On November 6, 2015, Lindgren ventured outside the station with Kelly again for his second spacewalk. Over the course of the 7 hour and 48-minute spacewalk, the two astronauts worked to restore a portion of the ISS's cooling system to its primary configuration, returning ammonia coolant levels to normal in the primary and backup radiator arrays.

On December 11, 2015, he returned to Earth alongside Kononenko and Yui following 141 days in space, the Soyuz touched down on the Kazakh Steppe at night, which is rare for the Soyuz. Following landing, Lindgren and Yui returned to the Johnson Space Center in Houston to rendezvous with their families.

=== Dragon 2 ===
Lindgren served as the only member of the backup crew for the SpaceX's Crew Dragon Demo-2 mission, the first test flight of SpaceX's Crew Dragon spacecraft. He trained as backup for both crew members, NASA astronauts Douglas Hurley and Robert Behnken, and was ready to take either the Spacecraft Commander or Joint Operations Commander seat if need be. He was also the commander of the backup crew for SpaceX Crew-1, the first operational flight of Crew Dragon spacecraft and first operational flight of the Commercial Crew Program. On March 19, 2019, Lindgren started five weeks of training on the ISS Russian Orbital Segment for the flight at the Gagarin Cosmonaut Training Center in Star City, Russia alongside NASA astronauts Michael Hopkins and Victor Glover.

In February 2021, he was assigned as commander of SpaceX Crew-4, which was his second long-duration mission to the ISS. He flew alongside NASA astronaut Bob Hines, who was assigned as pilot. They were joined by mission specialists Samantha Cristoforetti of ESA and Jessica Watkins of NASA. Crew-4 launched on April 27, 2022 and docked later that day. It splashed down off the coast of Florida with Lindgren on board on October 14, 2022 after 170 days in orbit.

== Personal life ==
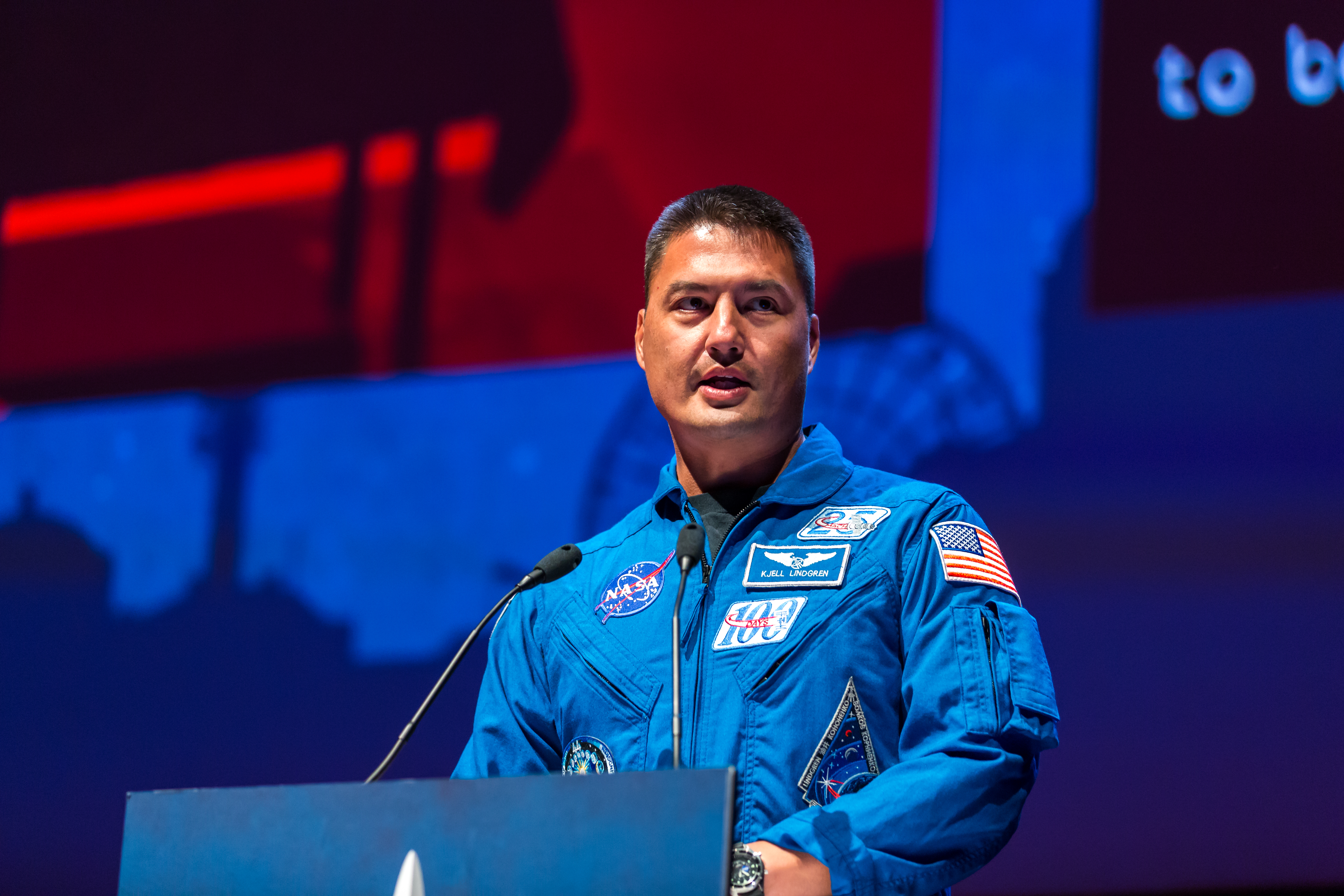
Kjell Lindgren at the Hugo Awards ceremony at Worldcon in Helsinki in 2017

Lindgren is married to Kristiana Lindgren and has three children. He has said that he enjoys running, scuba diving, reading, movies, photography, amateur astronomy, working with computers, and church activities.

Lindgren is also a science fiction fan, and in 2015 was a Guest of Honor at the 73rd World Science Fiction Convention while aboard the ISS. He participated in the Hugo Award ceremony as a guest presenter via videoconferencing, announcing Cixin Liu's win of the 2015 Hugo Award for Best Novel. He was also a special guest at Worldcon in Helsinki 2017. In 2017, he also served as the Toastmaster for the Nebula Awards in Pittsburgh.

Lindgren was a Boy Scout and attained the rank of Eagle Scout. During the 23rd World Scout Jamboree in Japan in 2015, Lindgren talked to a small group of Scouts via radio from the International Space Station. The Scouts asked him various questions about daily life at the space station and space.

=== Amateur radio ===
Lindgren is a General class Ham Radio operator call sign KO5MOS.

In October 2022, during his stay at the ISS, Lindgren talked live and direct to students from the school at the Argentine base Esperanza in Antarctica.^{NASA video}

== See also ==
- A Beautiful Planet, 2016 IMAX documentary film showing scenes of Earth which features Lindgren and other ISS astronauts.
- List of Asian American astronauts
