= Expedition 45 =

45th expedition to the International Space Station

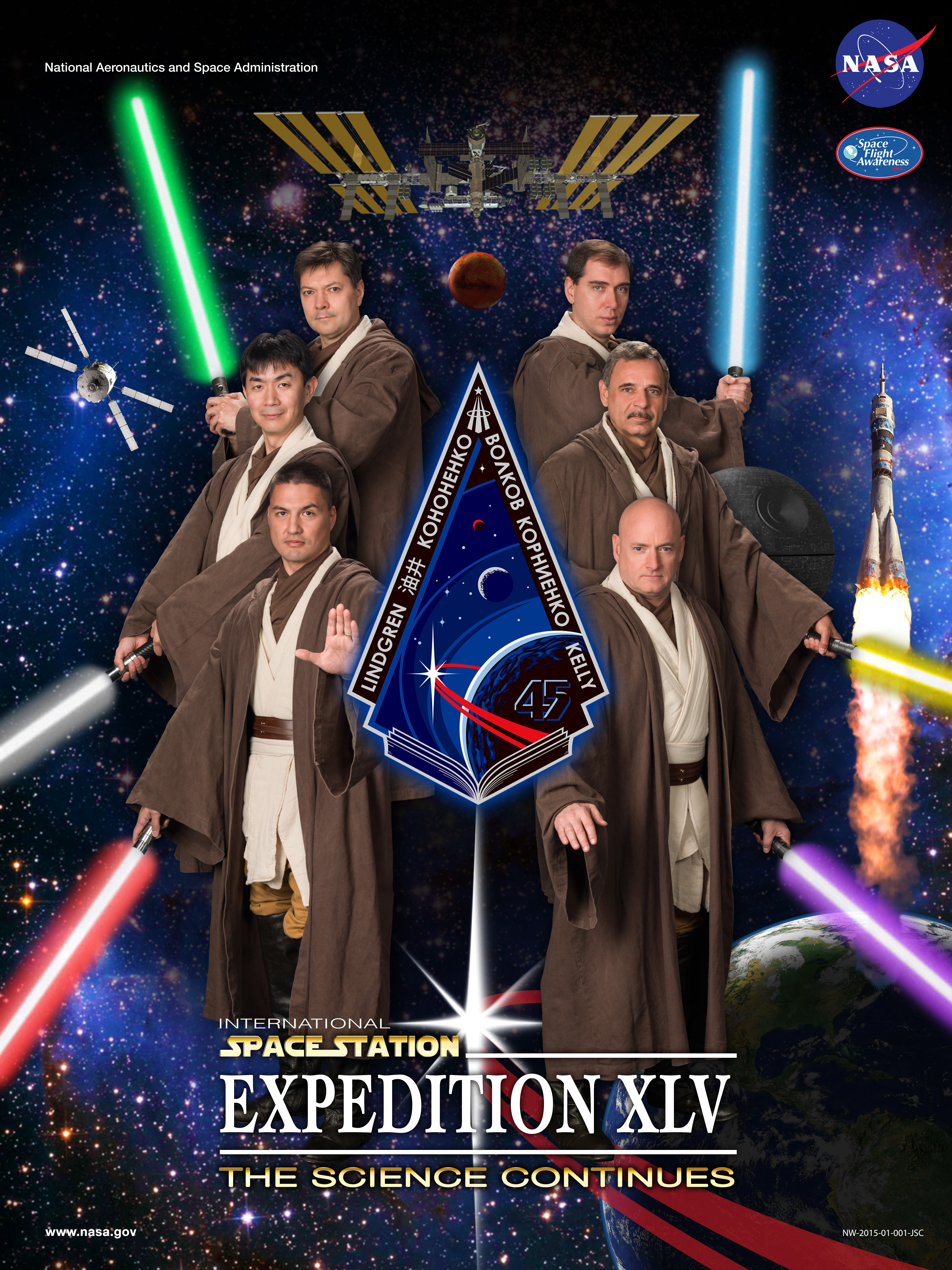
- Promotional poster
- Mission type: Long-duration expedition

Expedition
- Space station: International Space Station
- Began: 11 September 2015 UTC
- Ended: 11 December 2015 UTC
- Arrived aboard: Soyuz TMA-16M; Soyuz TMA-17M; Soyuz TMA-18M
- Departed aboard: Soyuz TMA-17M; Soyuz TMA-18M

Crew
- Crew size: 6 (Departed)
- Members: Expedition 44/45/46: Mikhail Korniyenko; Scott Kelly Expedition 44/45: Oleg Kononenko; Kimiya Yui; Kjell N. Lindgren Expedition 45/46: Sergey Volkov
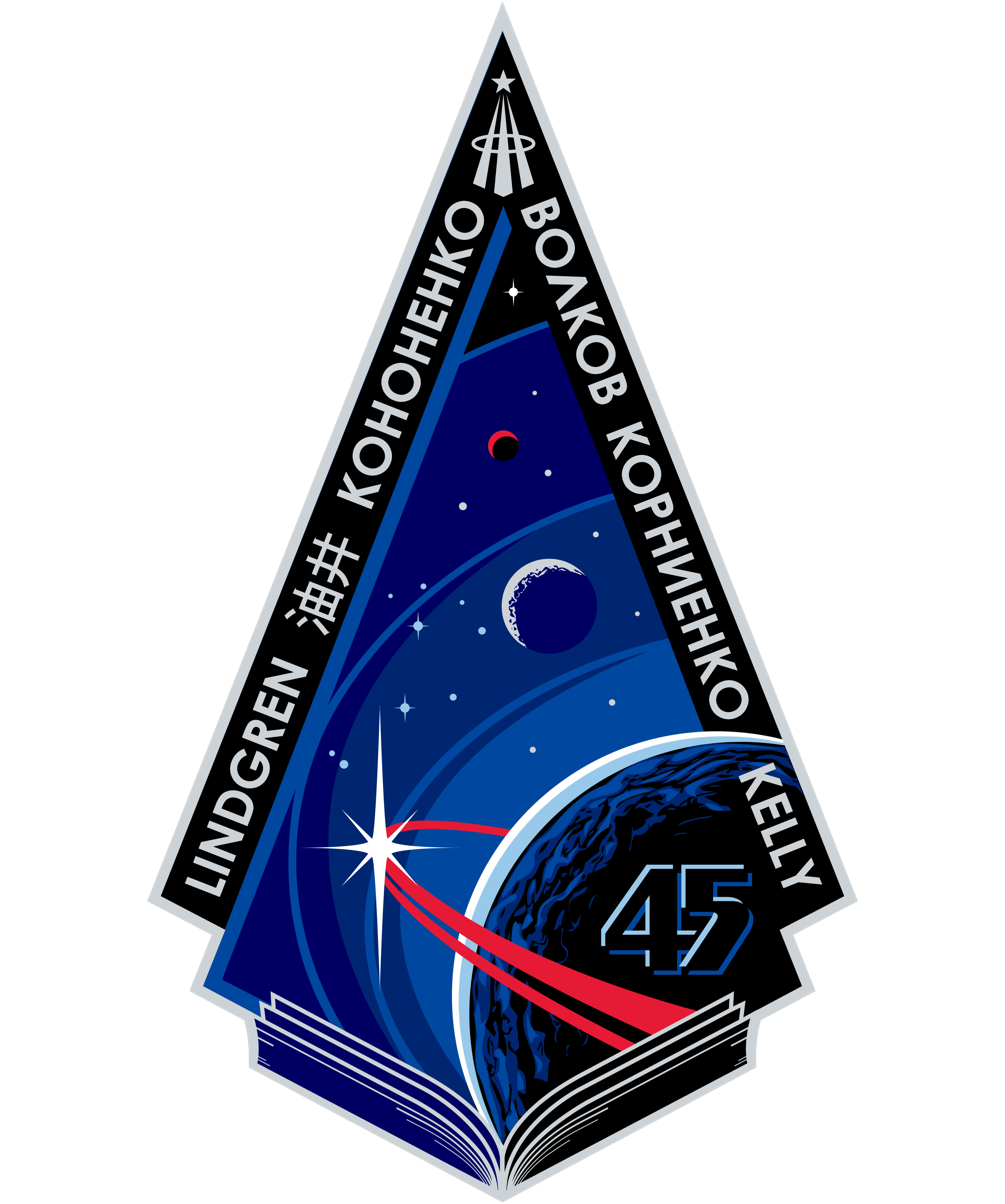
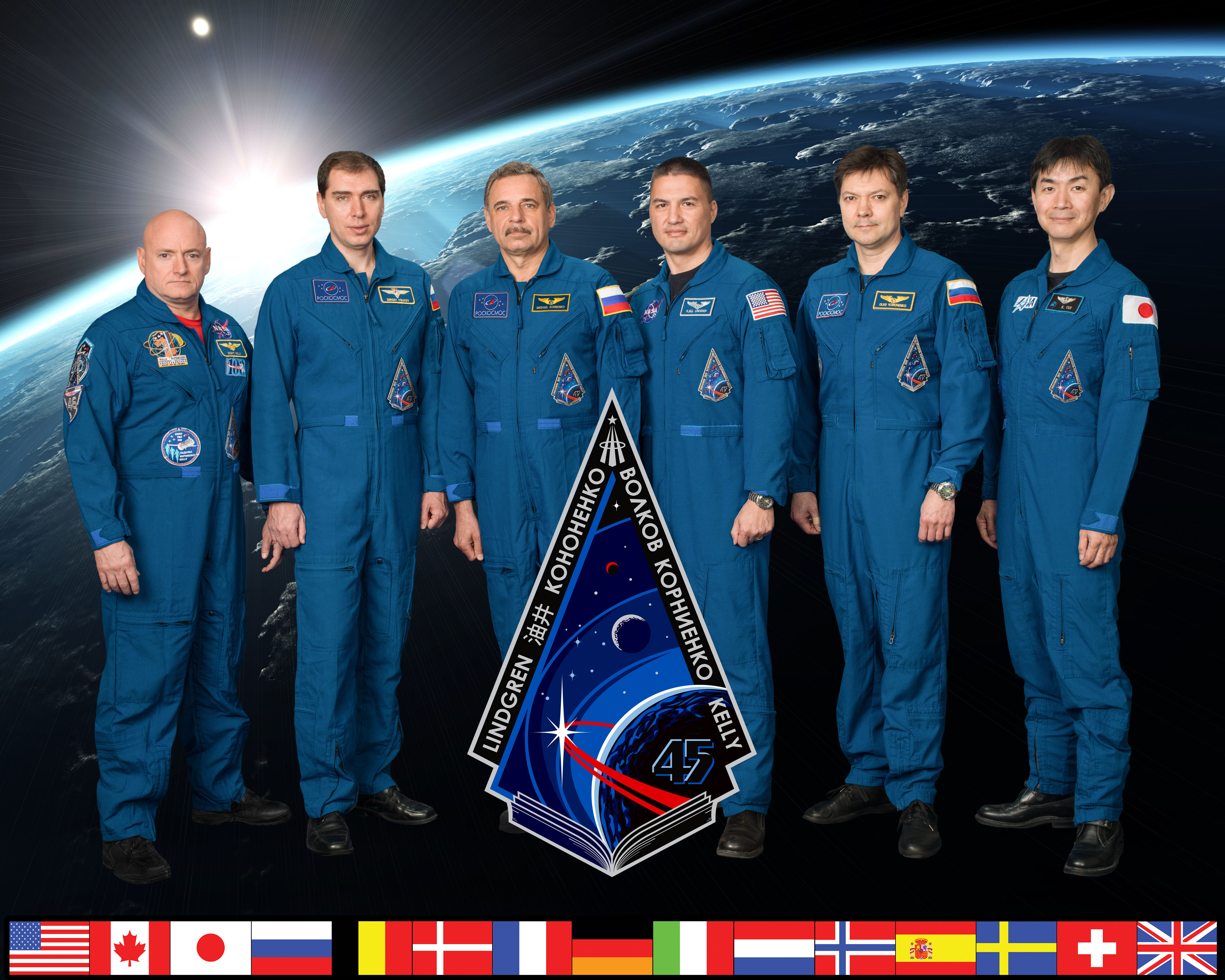
- Expedition 45 mission patch (l-r) Scott Kelly, Sergei Wolkow, Mikhail Korniyenko, Kjell Lindgren, Oleg Kononenko and Kimiya Yui ISS expeditions

Expedition 45 was the 45th expedition to the International Space Station. Scott Kelly and Mikhail Korniyenko transferred from Expedition 44 as part of their year-long stay aboard the ISS. Expedition 45 began with the departure of Soyuz TMA-16M at the ISS on September 11, 2015 and concluded with the departure of Soyuz TMA-17M on December 11, 2015. Kelly, Korniyenko, and Sergey Volkov then transferred to the crew of Expedition 46.

== Crew ==
Position	Crew
Commander	Scott Kelly, NASA; Fourth and last spaceflight
Flight engineer	Mikhail Korniyenko, RSA; Second and last spaceflight
Flight engineer	Oleg Kononenko, RSA; Third spaceflight
Flight engineer	Kimiya Yui, JAXA; First spaceflight
Flight engineer	Kjell N. Lindgren, NASA; First spaceflight
Flight engineer	Sergey Volkov, RSA; Third and last spaceflight

Source
Spacefacts

== See also ==
- ISS year long mission
