= Soyuz TMA-17M =

2015 Russian crewed spaceflight to the ISS

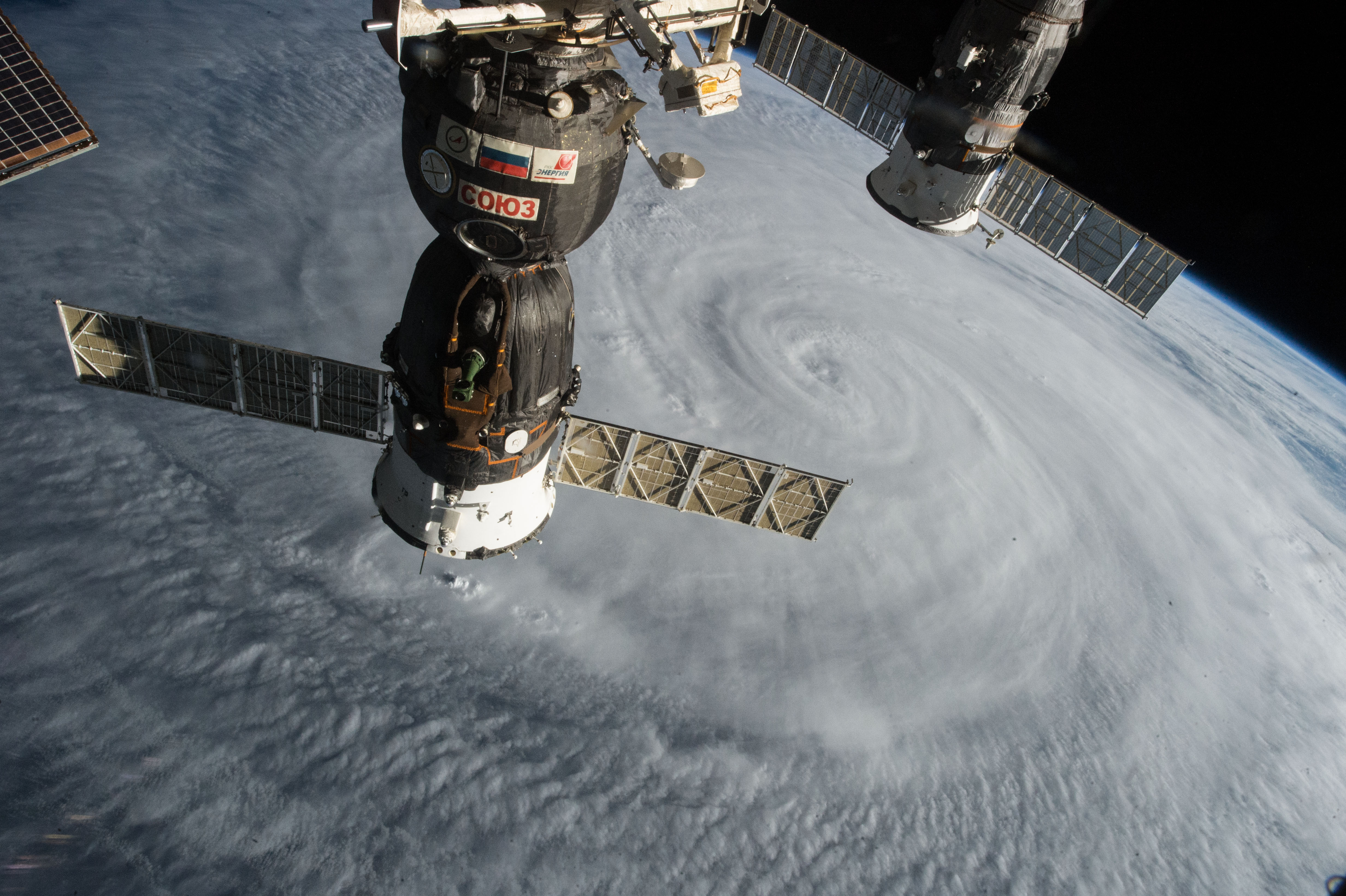
- Soyuz TMA-17M flying above Typhoon Soudelor while docked to the ISS
- Operator: Roscosmos
- COSPAR ID: 2015-035A
- SATCAT no.: 40744
- Mission duration: 141 days, 16 hours and 9 minutes

Spacecraft properties
- Spacecraft type: Soyuz-TMA 11F732A47 No.717
- Manufacturer: Energia

Crew
- Crew size: 3
- Members: Oleg Kononenko; Kimiya Yui; Kjell N. Lindgren

Start of mission
- Launch date: 22 July 2015; 21:02:45 UTC
- Rocket: Soyuz-FG
- Launch site: Baikonur 1/5

End of mission
- Landing date: 11 December 2015; 13:12 UTC
- Landing site: Kazakhstan

Orbital parameters
- Reference system: Geocentric
- Regime: Low Earth

Docking with ISS
- Docking port: Rassvet nadir
- Docking date: 23 July 2015; 02:45 UTC
- Undocking date: 11 December 2015; 09:47 UTC
- Time docked: 141 days, 7 hours, 2 minutes
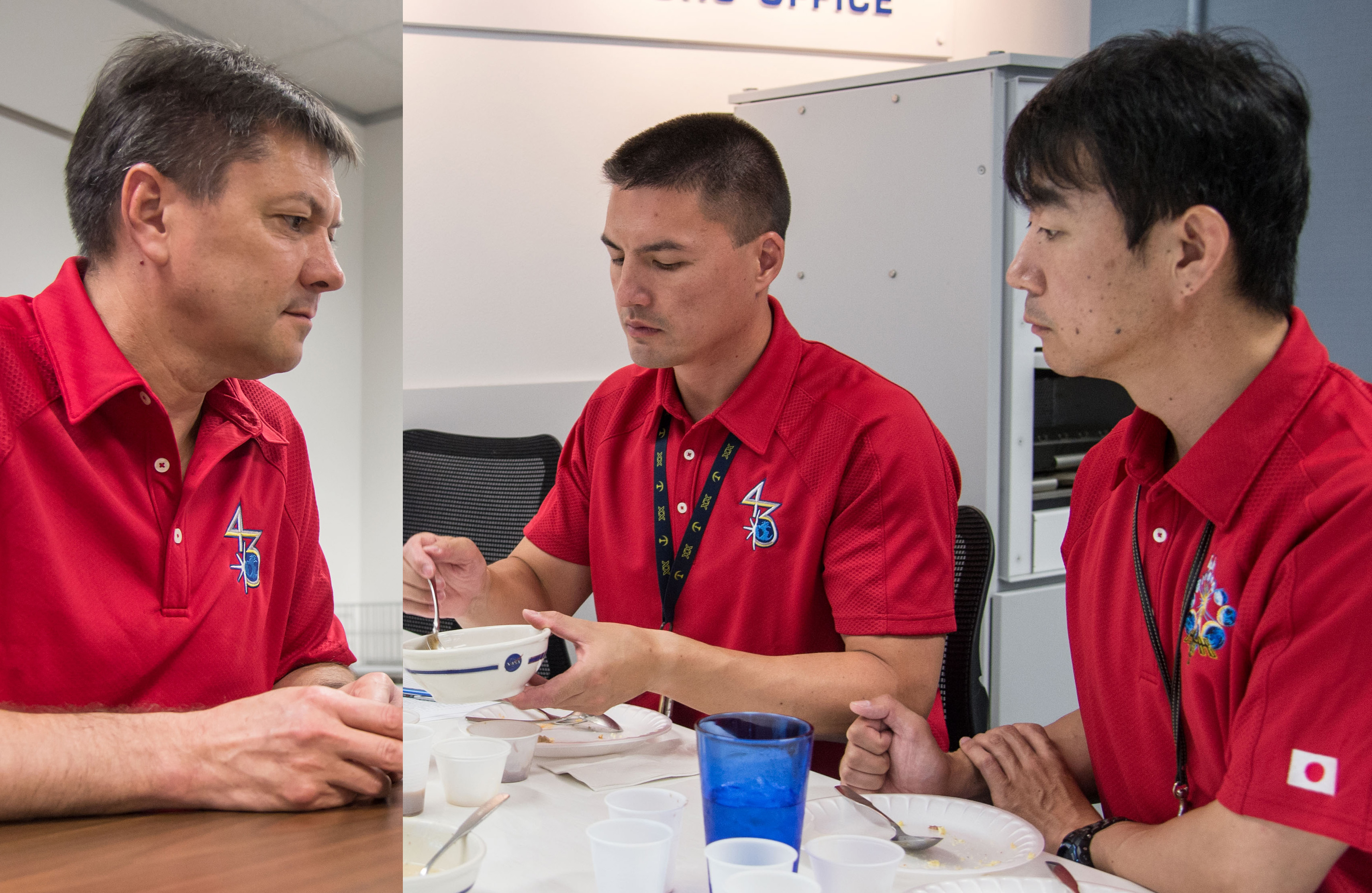
- (l-r) Kononenko, Lindgren and Yui Soyuz programme (Crewed missions)

Soyuz TMA-17M was a 2015 flight to the International Space Station. It transported three members of the Expedition 44 crew to the International Space Station. TMA-17M was the 126th flight of a Soyuz spacecraft; the first having occurred in 1967. The crew consisted of a Russian commander accompanied by Japanese and American astronauts. The capsule remained docked to the space station for about five months until the scheduled departure of Expedition 45 in December 2015. Soyuz TMA-17M landed safely on the steppes of Kazakhstan on 11 December, 2015, in a rare night landing.

== Crew ==
Position	Crew Member
Commander	(Russia) Oleg Kononenko, Roscosmos; Expedition 44/45; Third spaceflight
Flight Engineer 1	(Japan) Kimiya Yui, JAXA; Expedition 44/45; First spaceflight
Flight Engineer 2	(United States) Kjell N. Lindgren, NASA; Expedition 44/45; First spaceflight

=== Backup crew ===
Position	Crew Member
Commander	(Russia) Yuri Malenchenko, Roscosmos
Flight Engineer 1	(United States) Timothy Kopra, NASA
Flight Engineer 2	(United Kingdom) Timothy Peake, ESA

== Mission Insigna ==
The mission patch for the mission is completely based on Apollo 17 insignia.

== Gallery ==
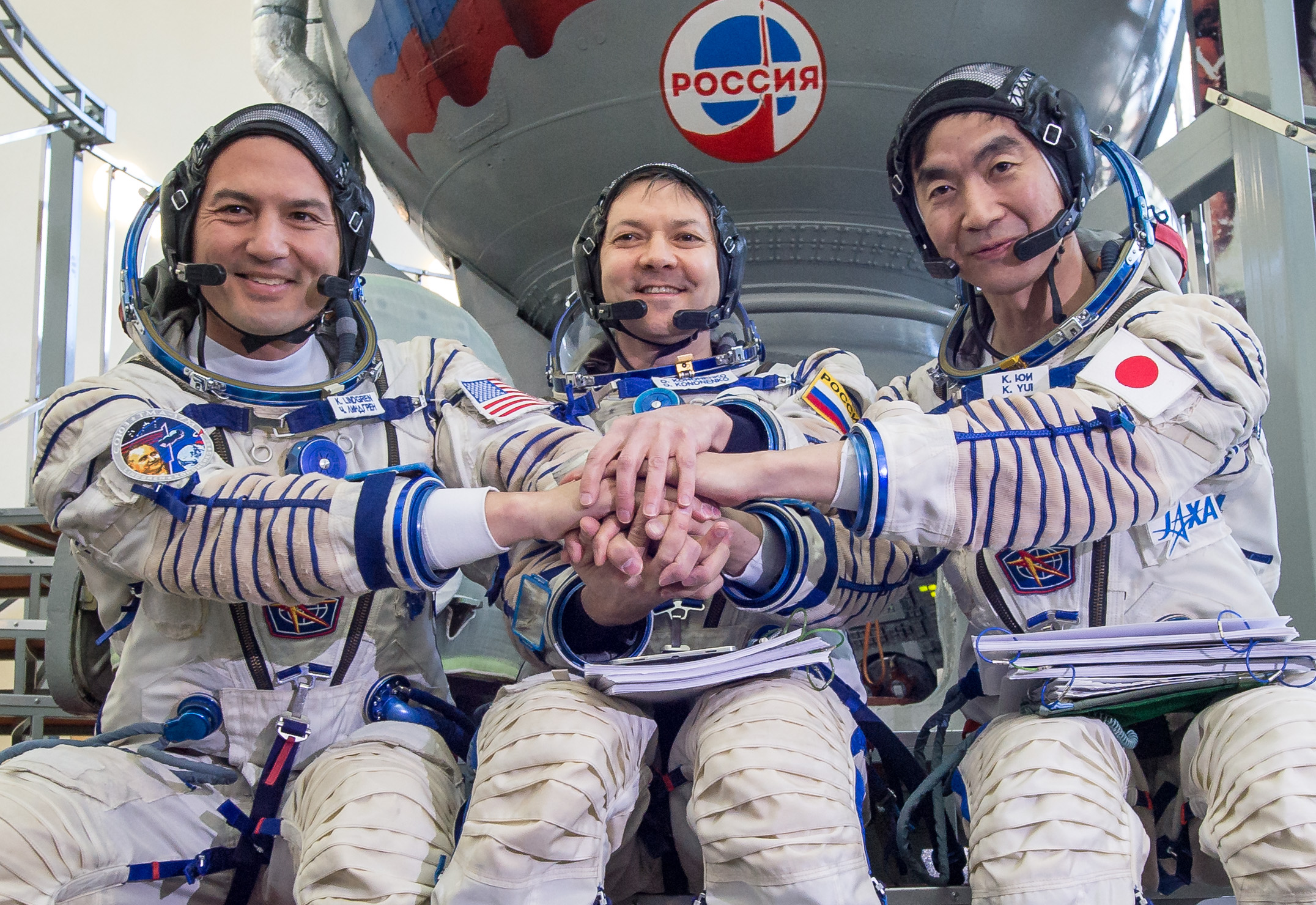
Soyuz TMA-17M crew photo on the second day of qualification exams. Left to right: Lindgren, Kononenko, Yui.

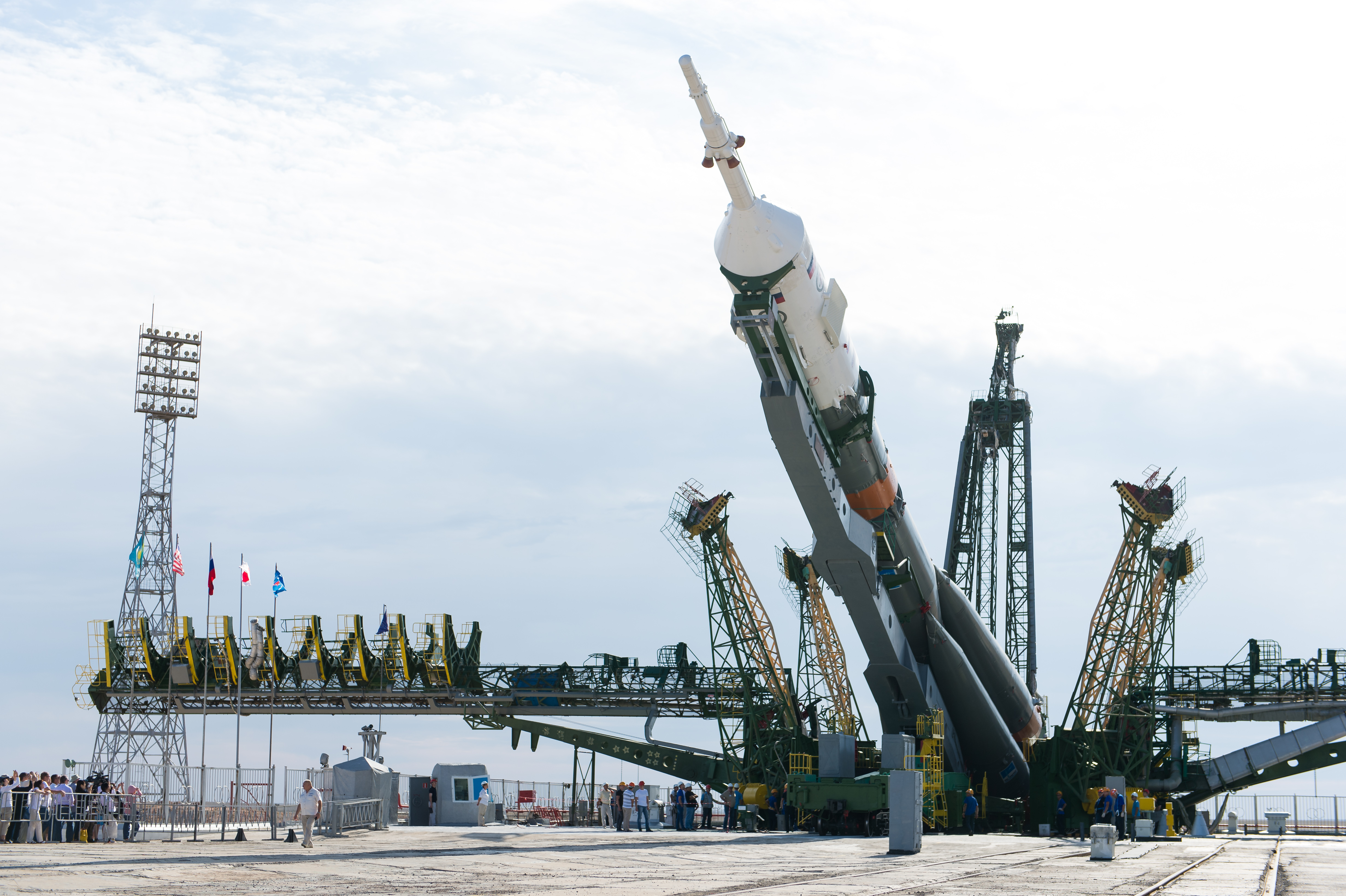
The Soyuz booster is raised into position on the launch pad at Baikonur.

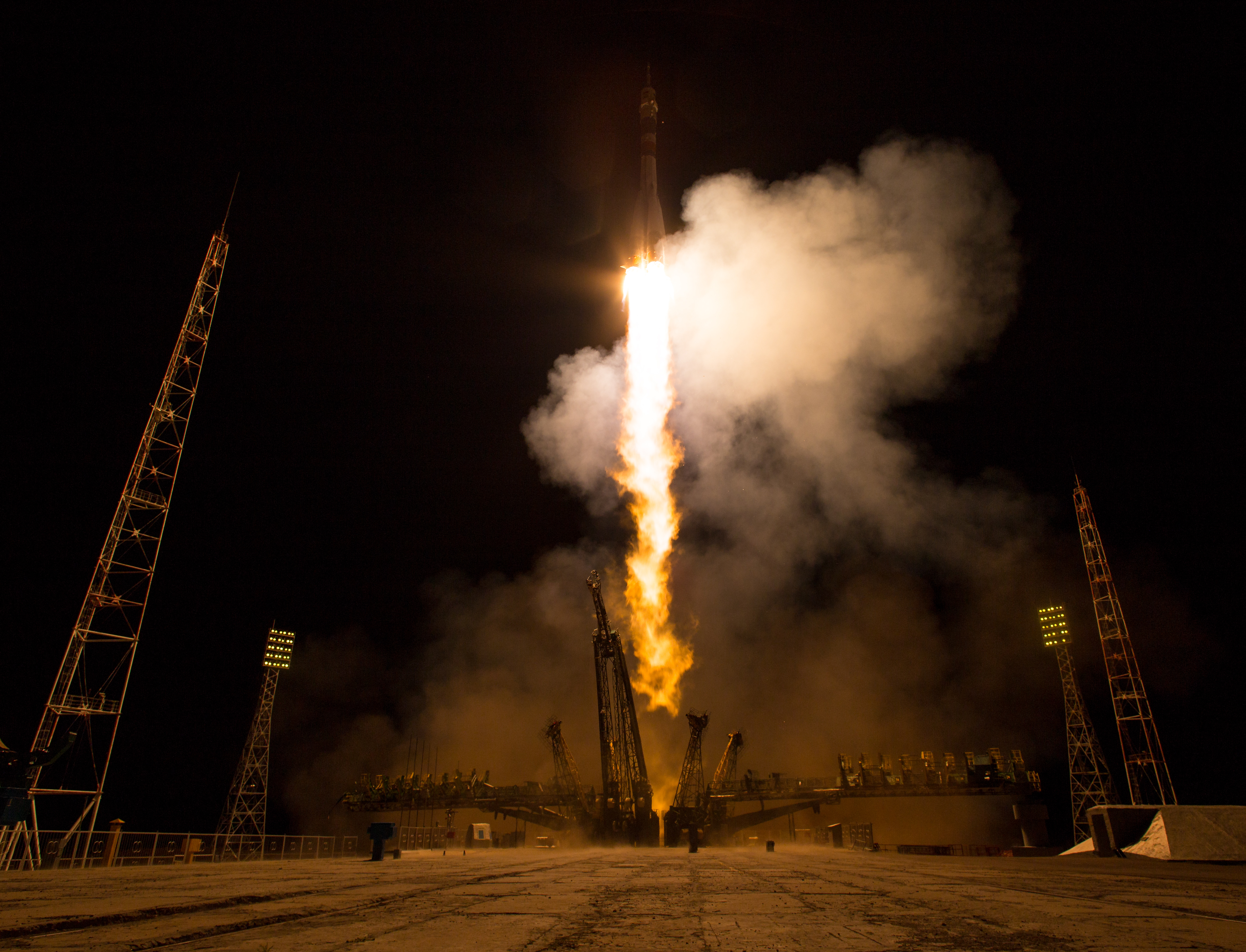
Launch of Soyuz TMA-17M.

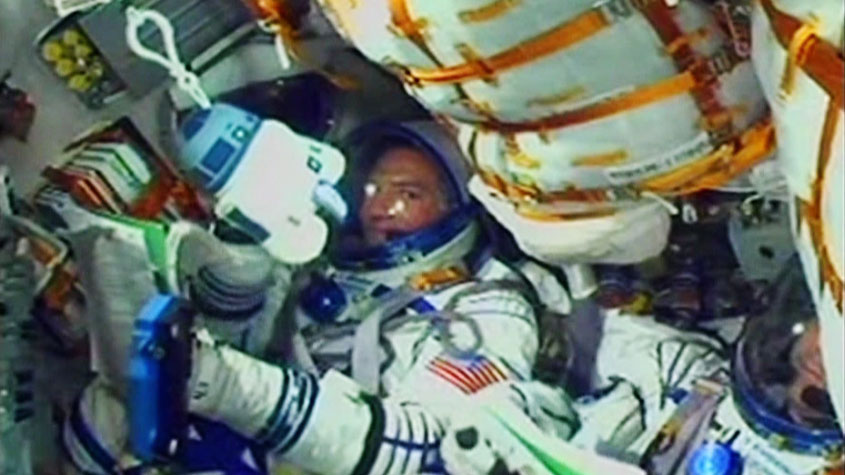
Inside the capsule during launch.

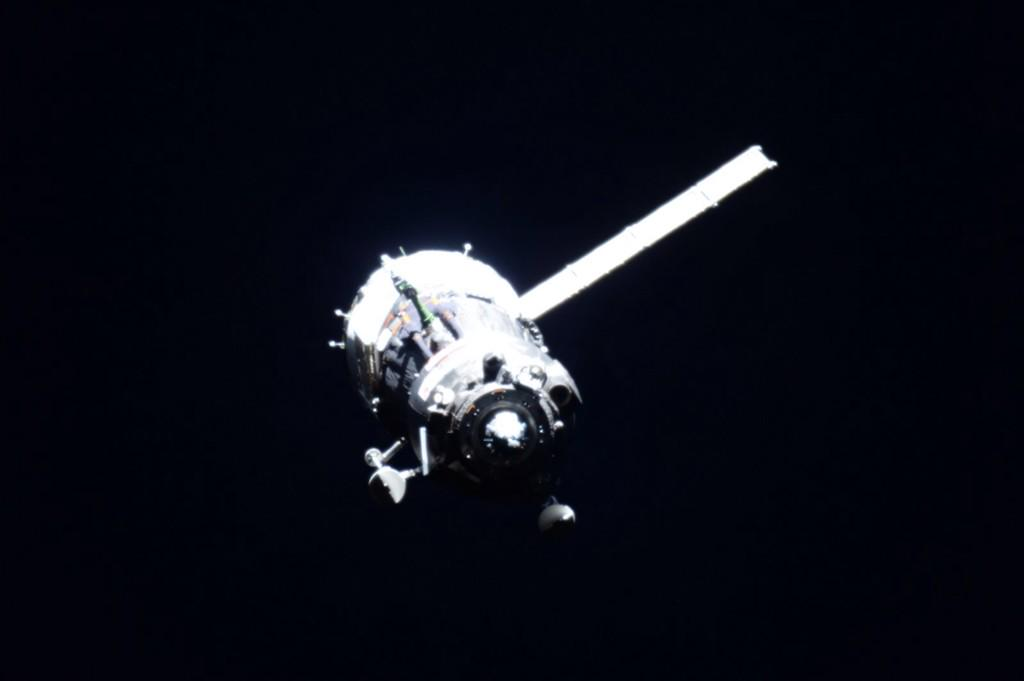
Soyuz TMA-17M approaches the ISS. Note the absence of one solar panel, which successfully deployed later on.

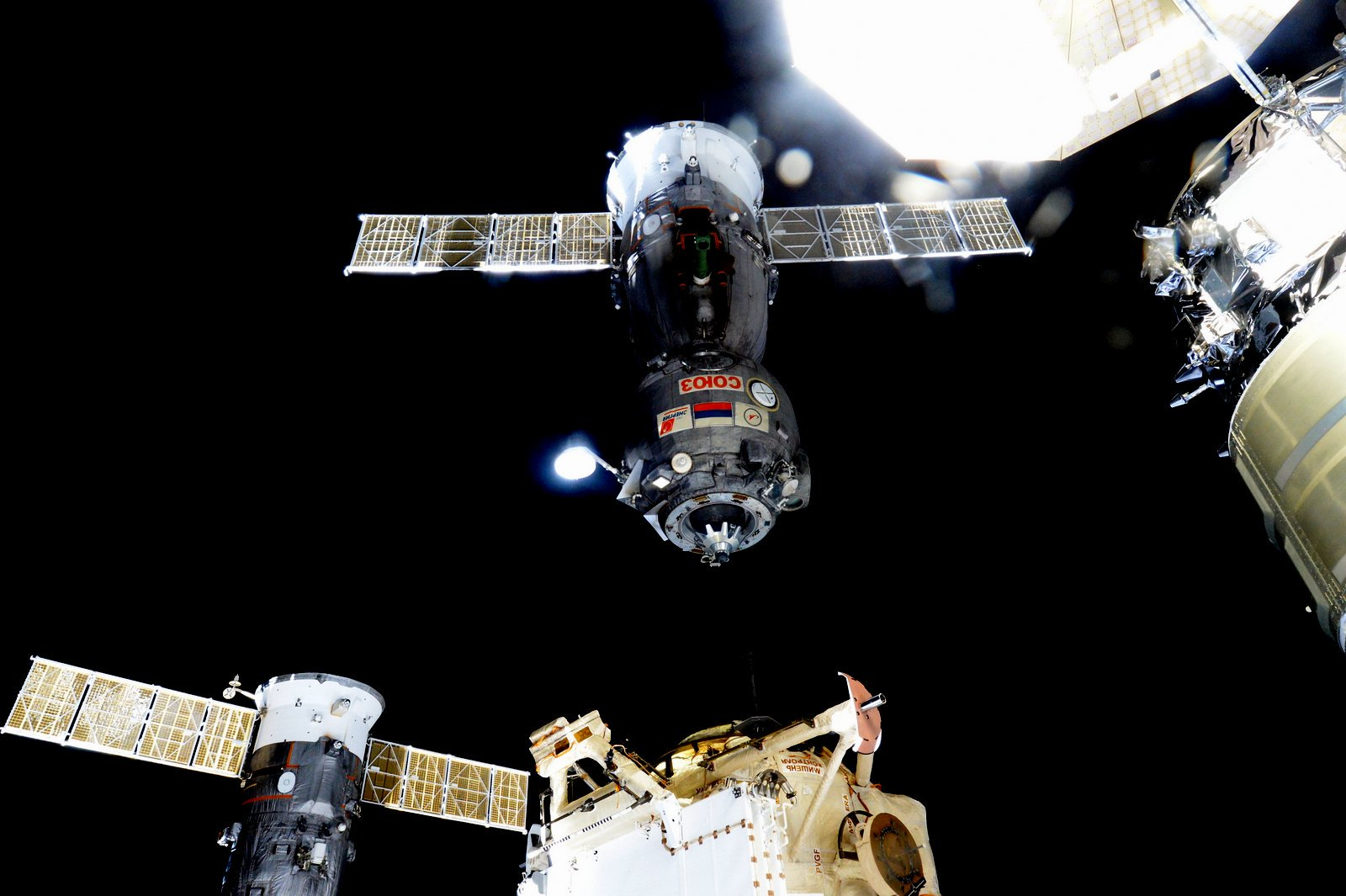
Soyuz TMA-17M departs from the space station.

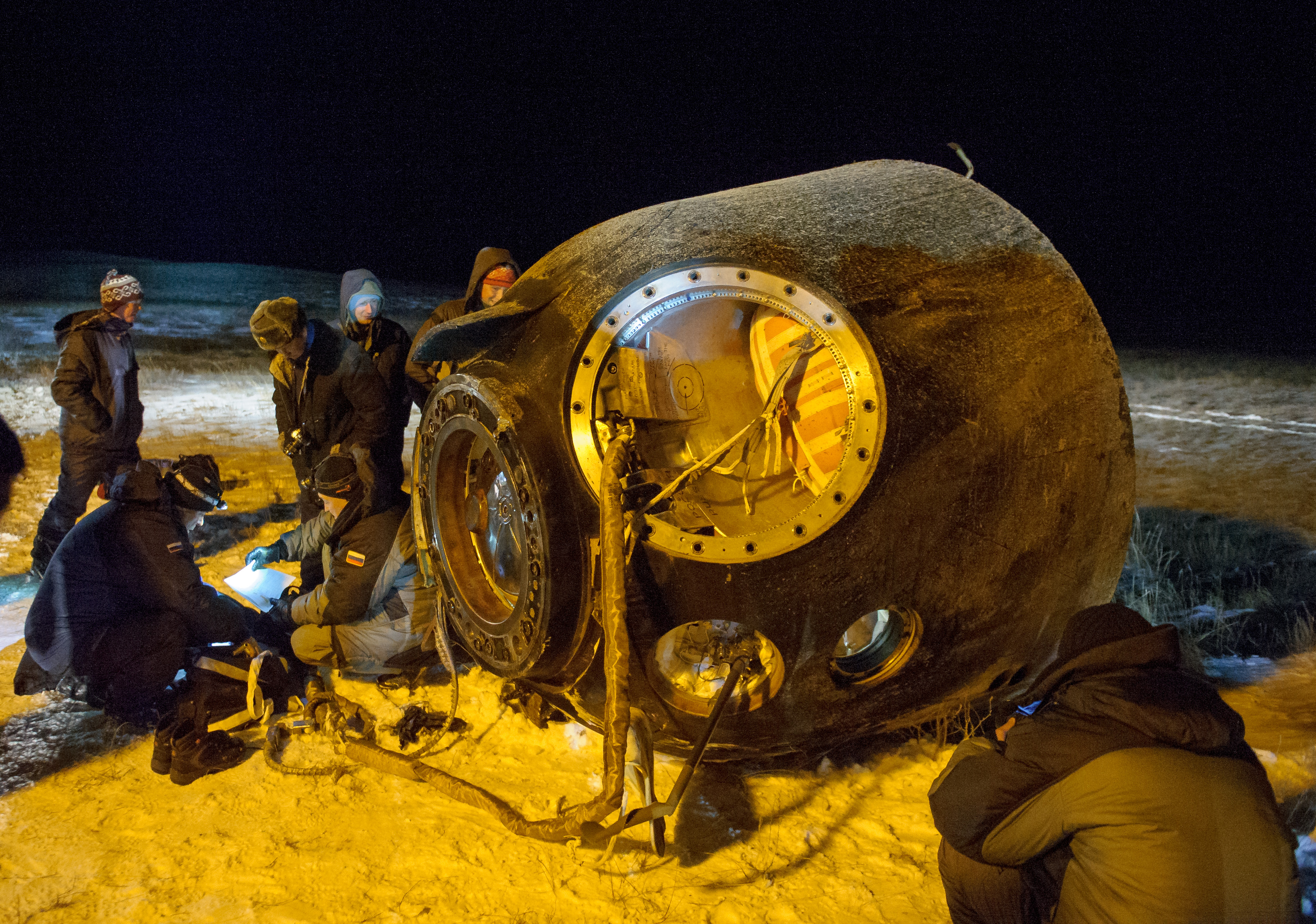
The Soyuz return capsule on the ground after a rare night landing.

== See also ==
- 2015 in spaceflight
