= Expedition 44 =

Long-duration mission to the International Space Station

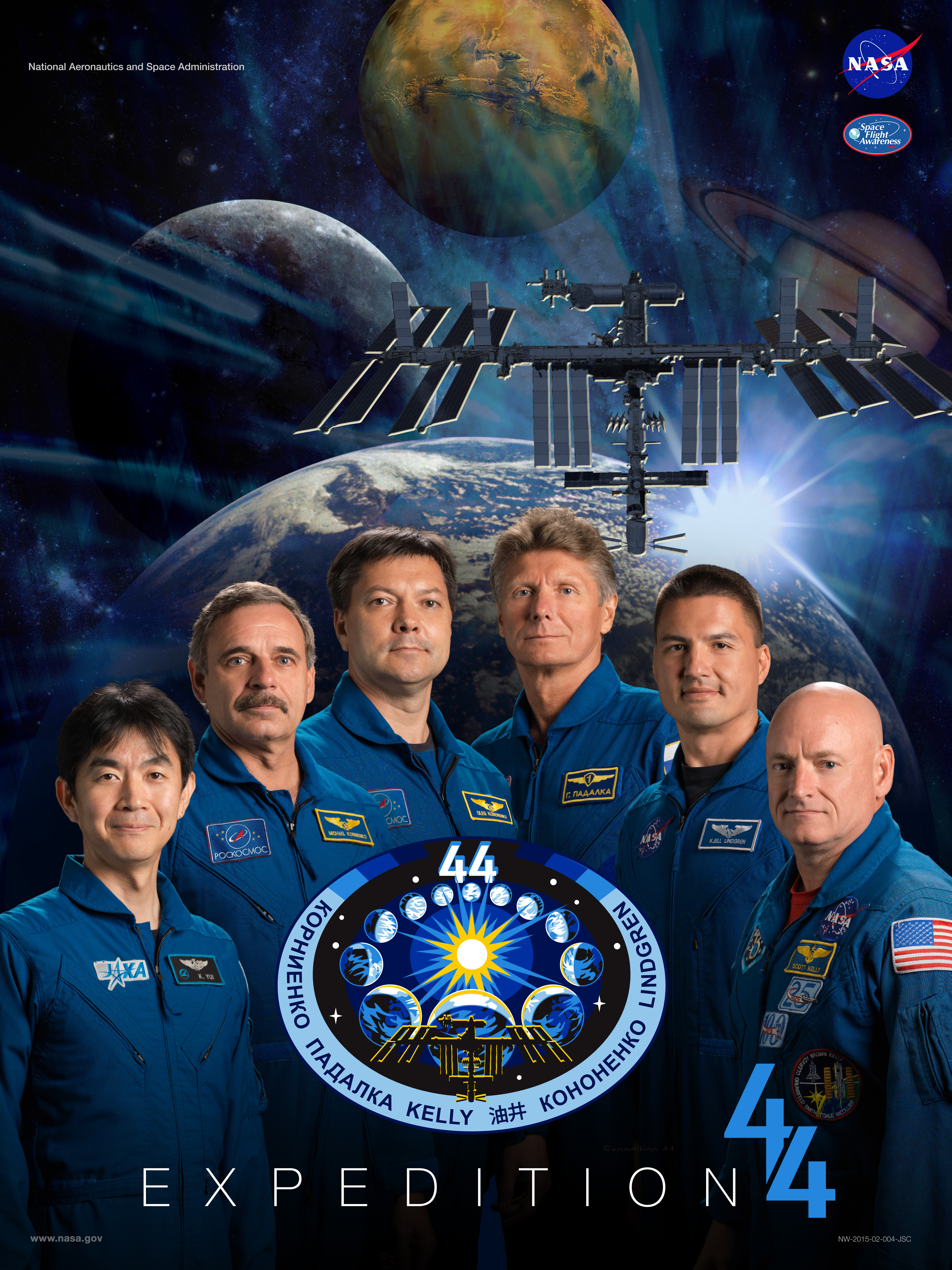
- Promotional Poster
- Mission type: Long-duration expedition

Expedition
- Space station: International Space Station
- Began: 11 June 2015 UTC
- Ended: 11 September 2015 UTC
- Arrived aboard: Soyuz TMA-16M; Soyuz TMA-17M
- Departed aboard: Soyuz TMA-16M; Soyuz TMA-17M; Soyuz TMA-18M

Crew
- Crew size: 6
- Members: Expedition 43/44: Gennady I. Padalka; Mikhail Korniyenko; Scott J. Kelly Expedition 44/45: Oleg Kononenko; Kimiya Yui; Kjell N. Lindgren
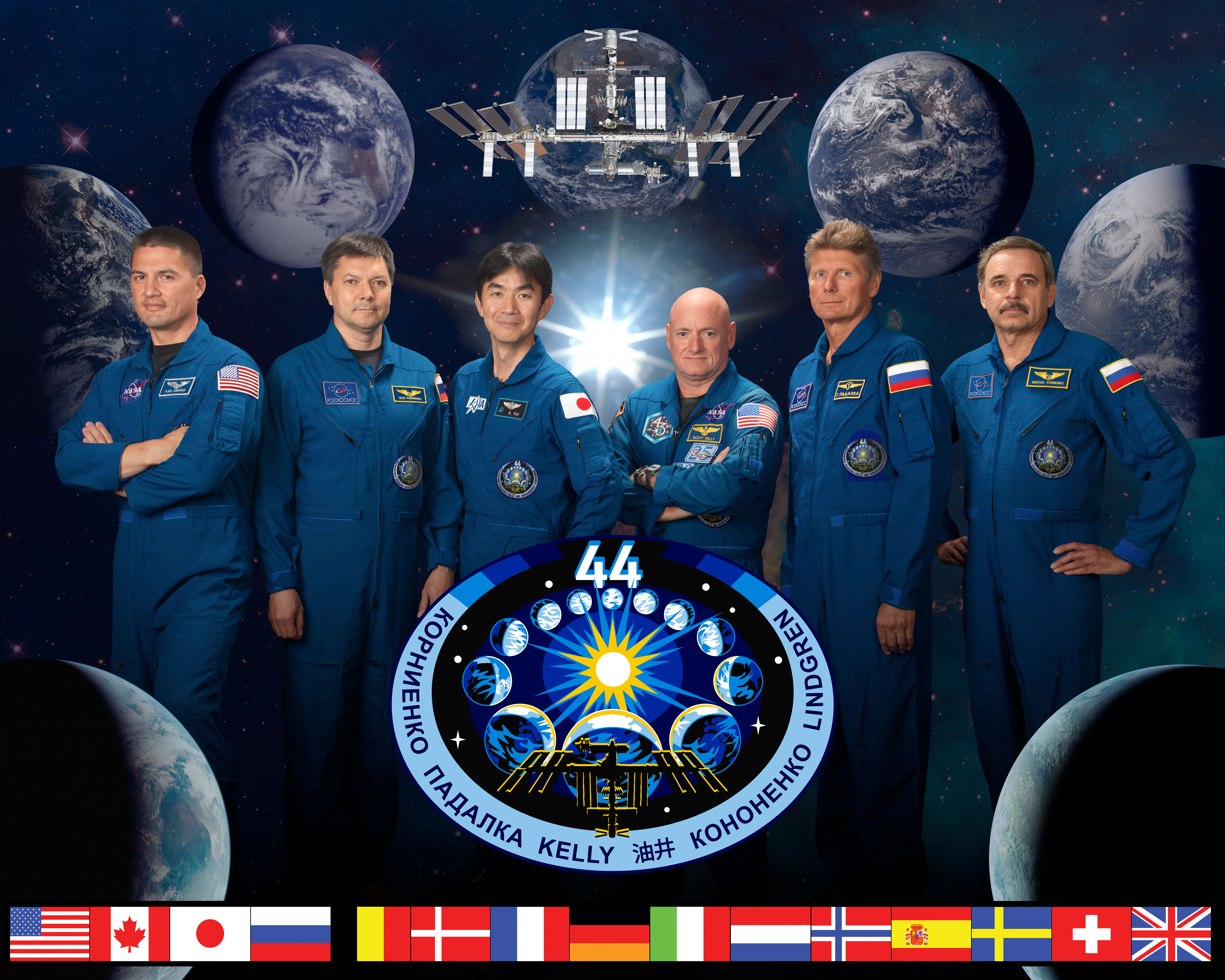
- Expedition 44 mission patch (l-r) Kjell Lindgren, Oleg Kononenko, Kimiya Yui, Scott Kelly, Gennady Padalka and Mikhail Korniyenko ISS expeditions

Expedition 44 was the 44th expedition to the International Space Station. It commenced with the departure of Soyuz TMA-15M from the ISS with the Expedition 42/43 crew on 11 June 2015 and ended with the departure of Soyuz TMA-16M on 11 September 2015.

Yury Lonchakov was originally supposed to be the commander of Expedition 44 following being Flight Engineer 3 on Expedition 43. However, he resigned from the Russian Federal Space Agency on September 6, 2013.

== Crew ==
Position	First Part (June to July 2015)	Second Part (July 2015 to September 2015)
Commander	Gennady Padalka, RSA; Fifth and last spaceflight	
Flight Engineer 1	Mikhail Korniyenko, RSA; Second and last spaceflight	
Flight Engineer 2	Scott Kelly, NASA; Fourth and last spaceflight	
Flight Engineer 3		Oleg Kononenko, RSA; Third spaceflight
Flight Engineer 4		Kimiya Yui, JAXA; First spaceflight
Flight Engineer 5		Kjell N. Lindgren, NASA; First spaceflight

Source
Spacefacts

== Achievements ==
In July 2015, Kelly and Lindgren became the first Americans ever to eat food grown entirely in space

== See also ==
- ISS year long mission
