= ISS year-long mission =

Research project of the health effects of being in space long term

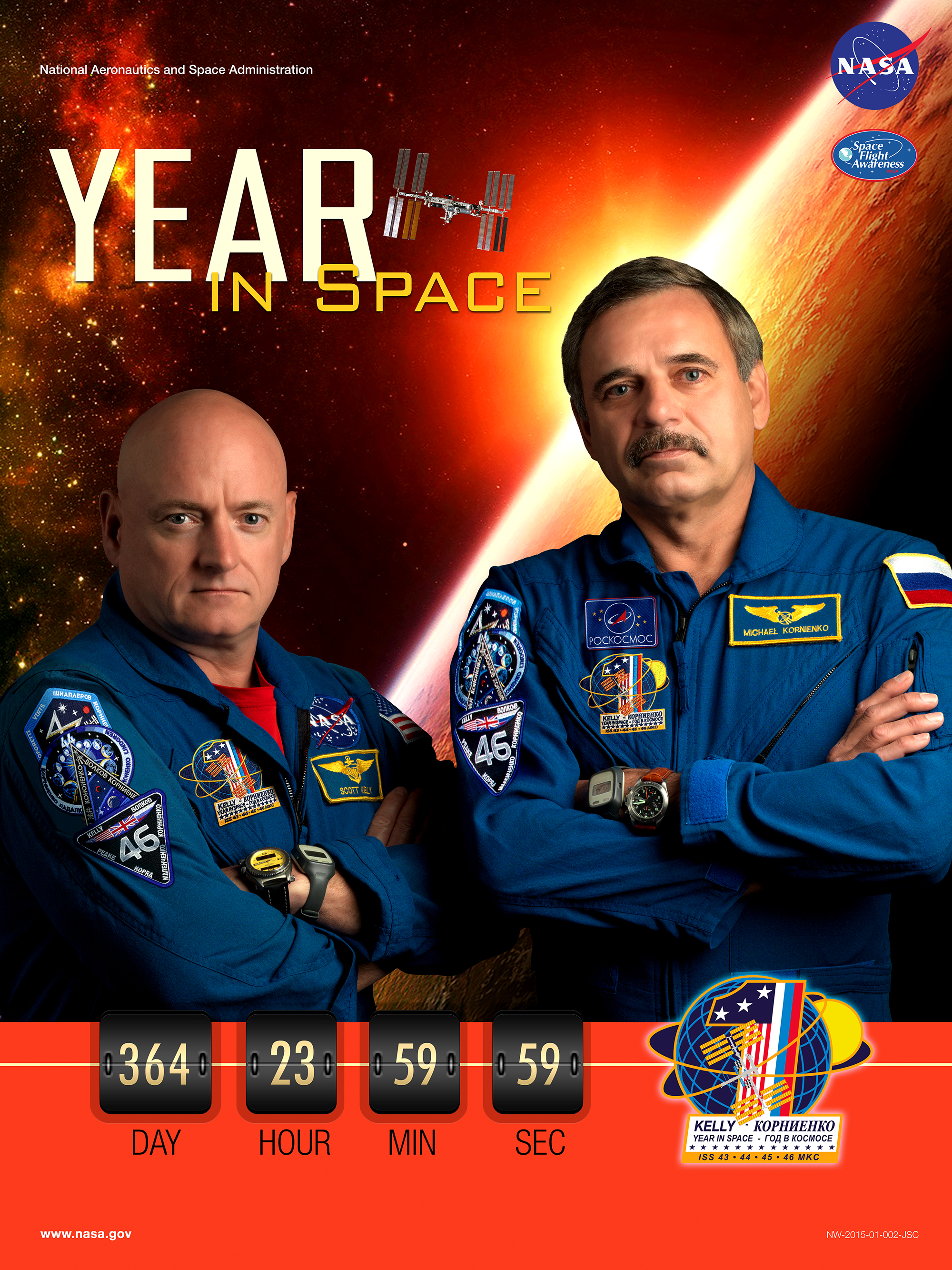
- Promotional Poster
- Mission type: Long-duration expedition
- Mission duration: 340d 8h 43m
- Orbits completed: 5,356

Expedition
- Space station: International Space Station
- Began: March 27, 2015, 19:42 UTC
- Ended: March 2, 2016, 04:25 UTC
- Arrived aboard: Soyuz TMA-16M
- Departed aboard: Soyuz TMA-18M

Crew
- Crew size: 2
- Members: Scott Kelly; Mikhail Kornienko
- EVAs: 4
- EVA duration: 23h 54m
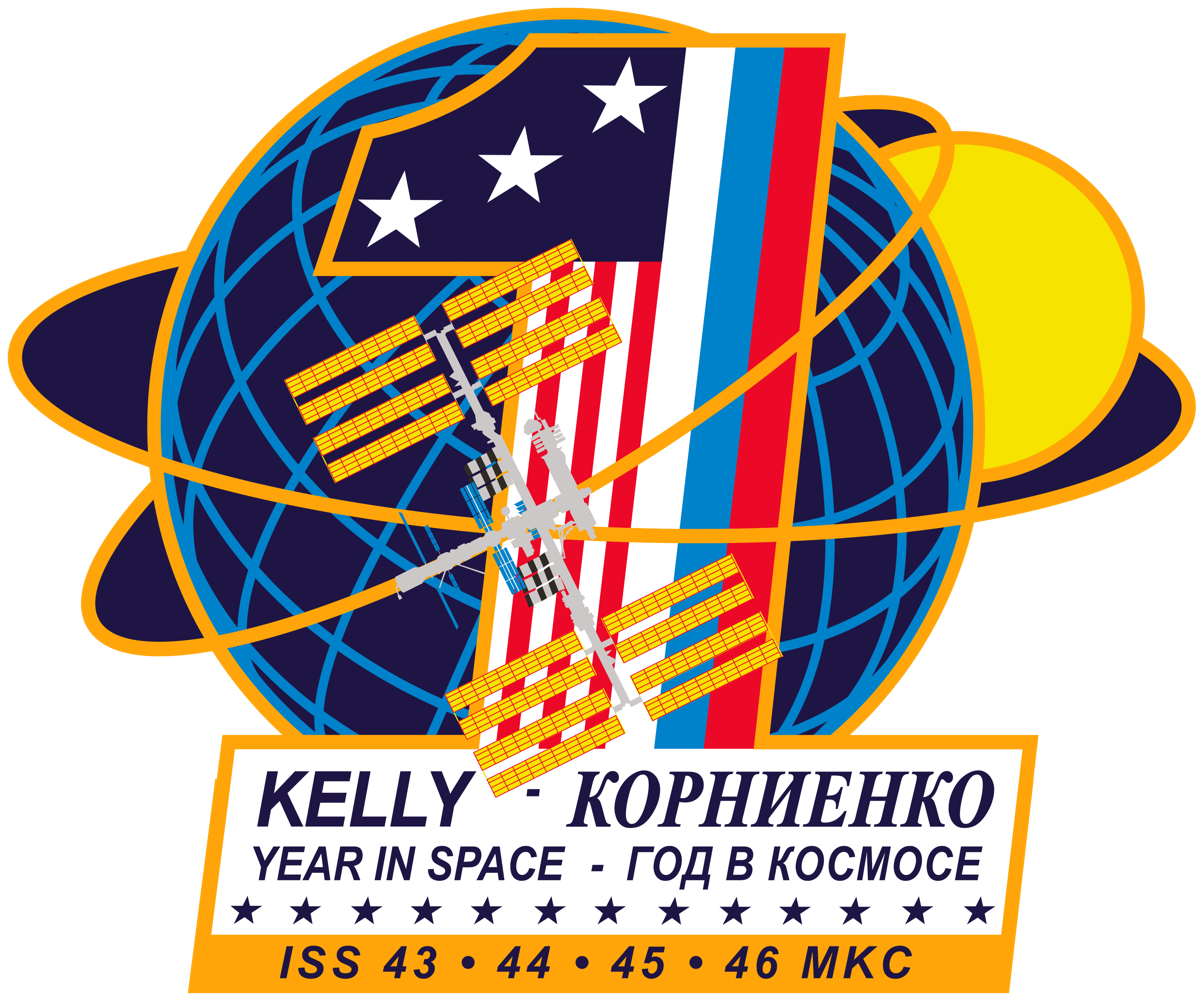
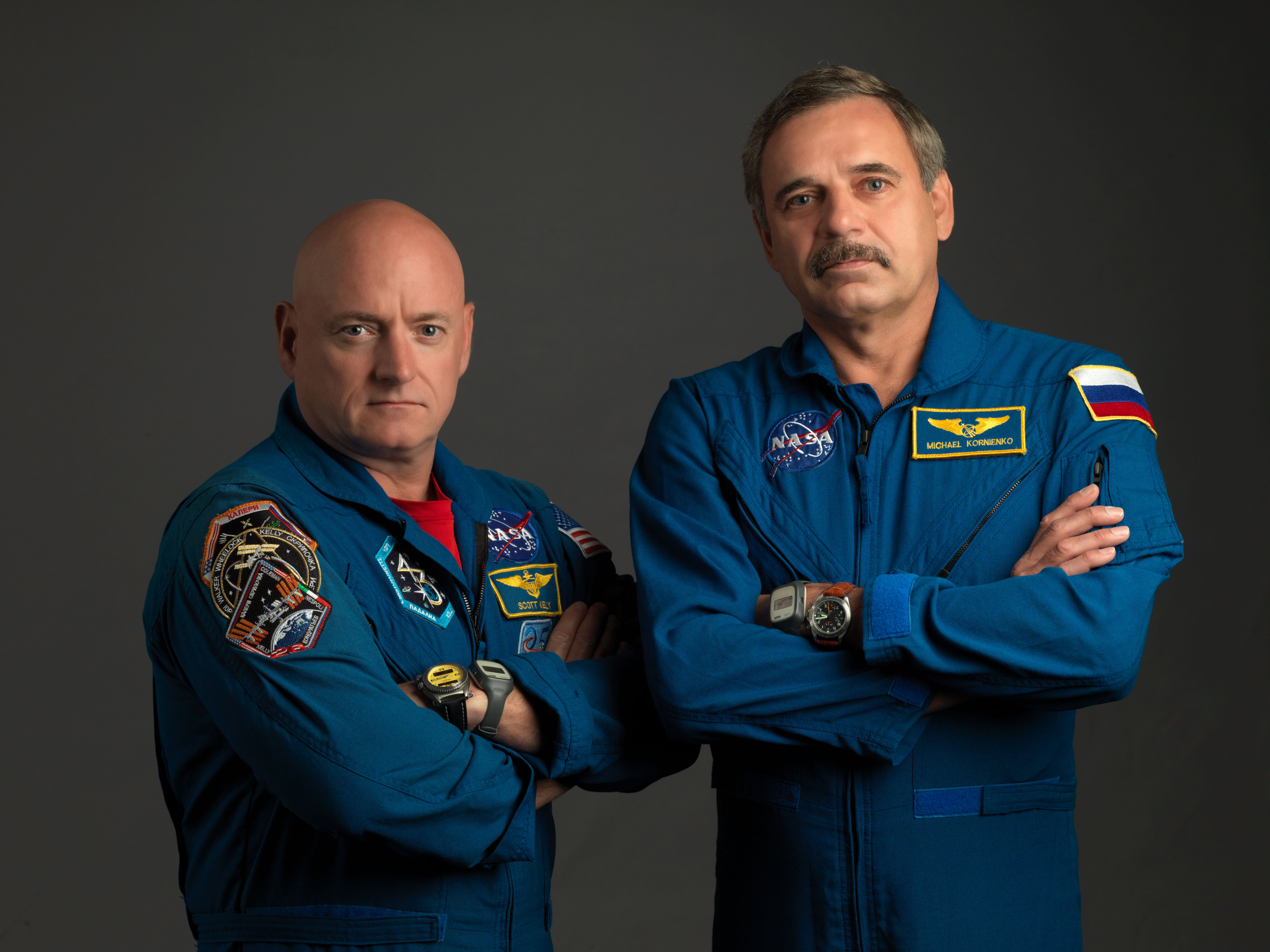
- Scott Kelly and Mikhail Kornienko

The ISS year-long mission, also called the One-Year Mission, was an 11-month-long scientific research project aboard the International Space Station, which studied the health effects of long-term spaceflight.

As part of the mission, the NASA Twins Study was conducted. Astronaut Scott Kelly was selected for the mission with his identical twin, Mark Kelly, who stayed on Earth as a control. Scott spent 340 days in space for the experiment. The result demonstrated several long-lasting changes, including those related to alterations in DNA and cognition.

== Mission ==
Astronaut Scott Kelly and cosmonaut Mikhail Kornienko spent 340 days in space with scientists performing medical experiments. Kelly and Kornienko launched on 27 March 2015 on Soyuz TMA-16M, along with Gennady Padalka. The mission encompassed Expeditions 43, 44, 45, and 46. The pair safely landed in Kazakhstan on 2 March 2016, returning aboard Soyuz TMA-18M with Sergey Volkov. The mission supported the NASA Twins study, which helps shed light on the health effects of long-duration spaceflight.

The goal aboard the orbiting laboratory was to understand better how the human body reacts and adapts to the harsh environment of space. Data from the mission was used to improve assessments of crew performance and health. They worked to develop and validate better countermeasures against the risks associated with future missions around the Moon, asteroids, and ultimately Mars.

== Selection ==
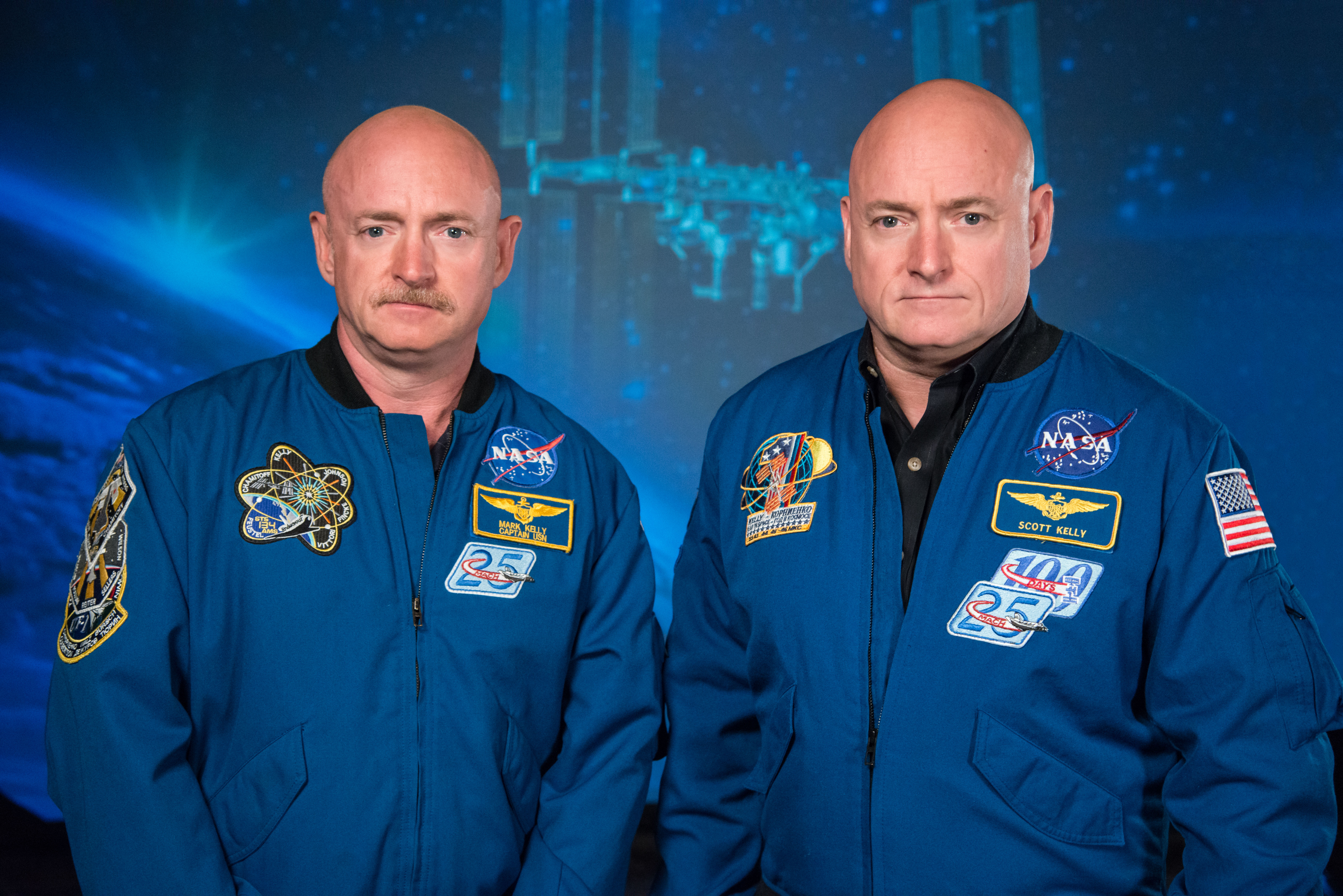
Identical twins Mark and Scott Kelly

In November 2012, NASA, the Russian Federal Space Agency (Roscosmos), and their international partners selected two veteran spacefarers for a one-year mission aboard the ISS in 2015. Astronaut Scott Kelly was selected as the identical twin of Mark Kelly. The mission included collecting scientific data important to future human exploration of the Solar System. Kelly and Kornienko already had an indirect connection: Kelly was a backup crew for the station's Expedition 23/24, where Korniyenko served as a flight engineer.

== NASA Twins Study ==
=== Experiment ===
Identical twins Mark Kelly and Scott Kelly were studied for changes in the health of a body in space compared to a body on Earth. A variety of mechanisms in the human body were analyzed, notably telomere length, body mass, eye and bone deformation, and immune response. Ten research teams are assembled to conduct an integrated research on the change on physiological, molecular and cognitive level after exposing to long-duration spaceflight.

The study also required the astronauts to keep a journal, and investigated the psychological effects of living in a confined space for an extended length of time. Kornienko said of his experiences on Expedition 23/24: "The thing you miss there most of all is the Earth itself, I missed smells. I missed trees, I even dreamt of them. I even hallucinated. I thought I smelled a real fire and something being barbecued on it! I ended up putting pictures of trees on the walls to cheer up. You do miss the Earth there." Scott stated that he missed feeling changes in the weather while on the ISS.

=== Results ===
On 12 April 2019, NASA reported medical results, from the NASA Twins study, which demonstrated several surprising changes, including those related to alterations in DNA and cognition, when one twin was compared with the other.

The study found that "significant changes in multiple data types were observed in association with the spaceflight period; the majority of these eventually returned to a preflight state within the time period of the study. These included changes in telomere length, gene regulation measured in both epigenetic and transcriptional data, gut microbiome composition, body weight, carotid artery dimensions, subfoveal choroidal thickness and peripapillary total retinal thickness, and serum metabolites. In addition, some factors were significantly affected by the stress of returning to Earth, including inflammation cytokines and immune response gene networks, as well as cognitive performance. For a few measures, persistent changes were observed even after 6 months on Earth, including some genes' expression levels, increased DNA damage from chromosomal inversions, increased numbers of short telomeres, and attenuated cognitive function."

==== Telomeres lengthened ====
During spaceflight, the length of telomeres increased by 14.5%. During spaceflight, the increase is observed from flight day 14 to flight day 334. The effect is rapidly reversed after returning Earth and ultimately fall back to near preflight level after 6 months (190 days). The other effects of spaceflight, such as reduced body mass and increased serum folate level, are associated with telomeres elongation.

Telomere length is associated with aging and lifespan. Shorter telomeres are related to early deaths, vice versa. However, the exact effect of spaceflight to lifespan is currently not known.

==== T cell production with vaccination ====
The study found no significant changes in T cell production after the first vaccination of the study.

== Effect of spaceflight on the human body ==
The International Space Station developed exercise equipment, including treadmills and resistance devices to limit muscle atrophy in a low gravity environment. Weightlessness causes body fluids in astronauts to accumulate in the upper half of the body, leading to facial edema and unwelcome side effects. One problem may be the low gravity affecting the body in unforeseen ways and it can be hard to detect the cause and effect of gravity on the body. Space seems to cause trouble for a number of body parts including bone, sometimes the eyes, and a classic problem is space sickness.

== Longest time spent in space by other astronauts ==
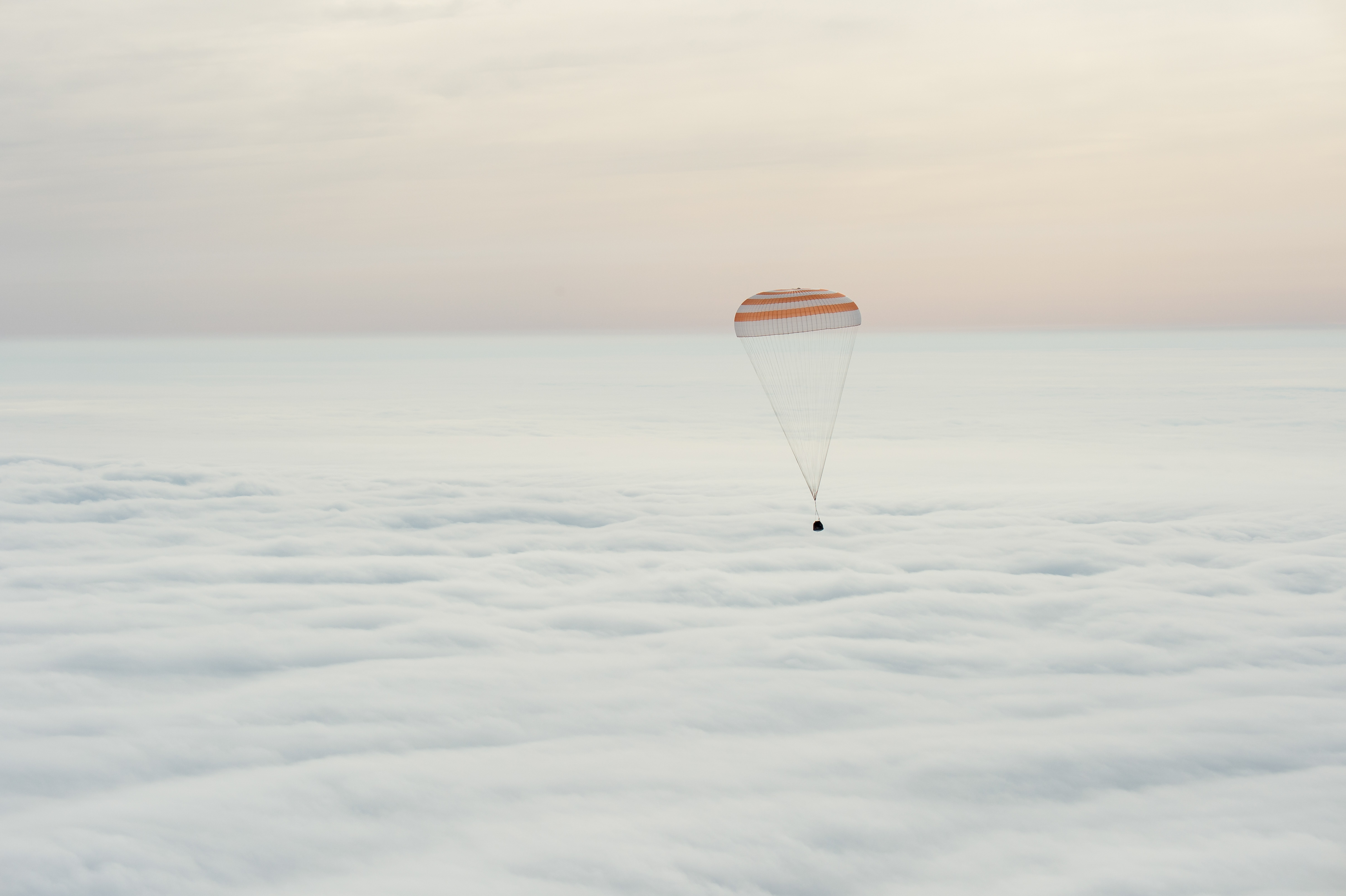
The Soyuz TMA-18M spacecraft is seen as it lands with Expedition 46 commander Scott Kelly of NASA and Russian cosmonauts Mikhail Kornienko and Sergey Volkov of Roscosmos near the town of Zhezkazgan, Kazakhstan, on Wednesday, March 2, 2016.

Vladimir Titov and Musa Manarov spent 366 days in space on Mir from December 1987 to December 1988. Valeri Polyakov spent 438 days on Mir in 1994-1995, and Sergey Avdeyev spent 380 days on Mir in 1998-1999.

Prior to the year-long mission, the longest mission on the ISS was 215 days by Mikhail Tyurin and Michael López-Alegría. Christina Hammock Koch holds the record for the longest single spaceflight by a woman at 328 days. In March 2022, NASA's Mark T. Vande Hei and the Russian Pyotr Dubrov landed, following 355 days in space as part of ISS Expeditions 64/65/66.

== See also ==
- Scientific research on the International Space Station
- Timeline of longest spaceflights
- Spaceflight records
- Human mission to Mars
