= Expedition 43 =

Long-duration mission to the International Space Station

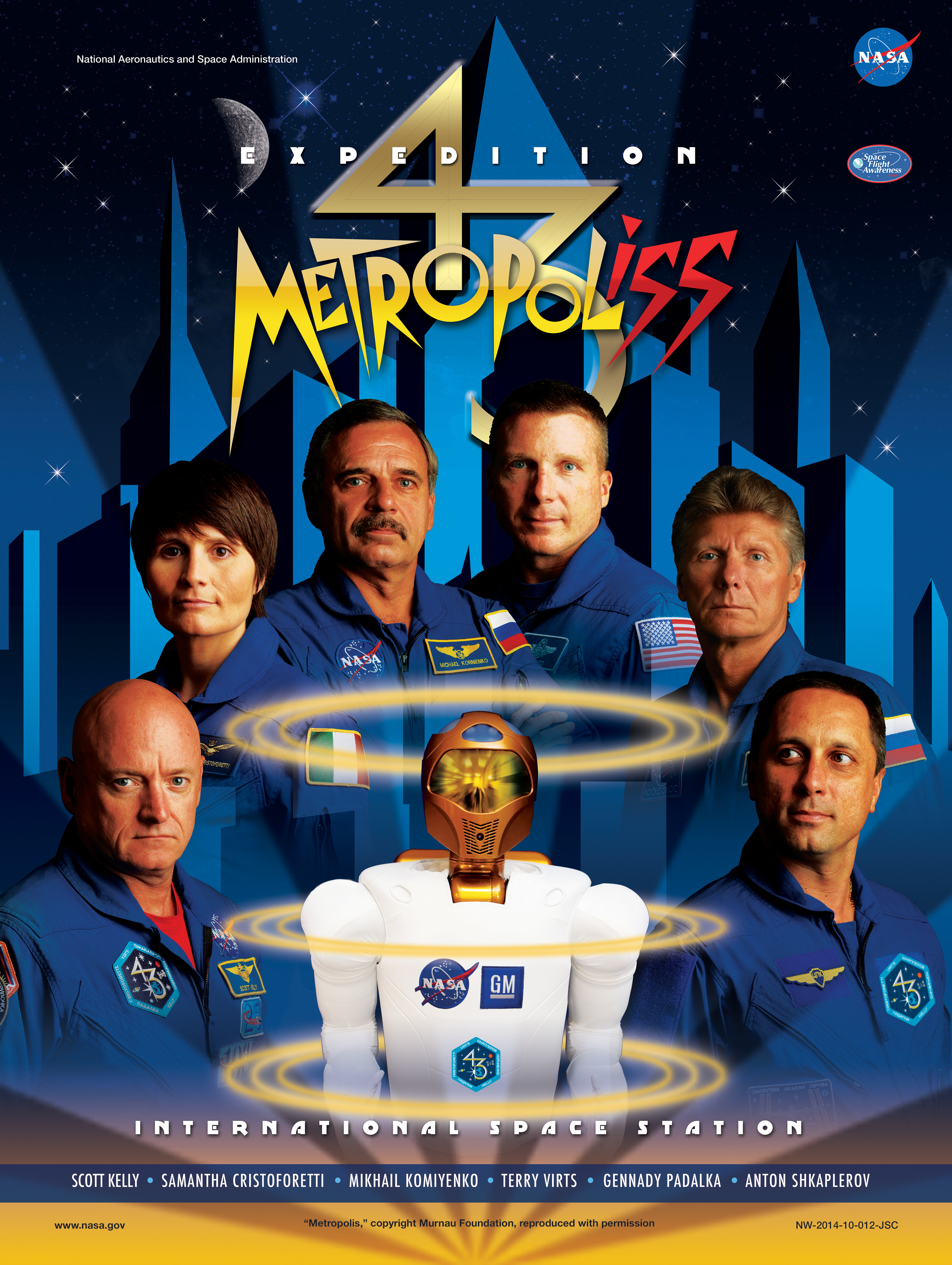
- Promotional Poster
- Mission type: Long-duration expedition

Expedition
- Space station: International Space Station
- Began: 11 March 2015 UTC
- Ended: 11 June 2015 UTC
- Arrived aboard: Soyuz TMA-15M; Soyuz TMA-16M
- Departed aboard: Soyuz TMA-15M; Soyuz TMA-16M; Soyuz TMA-18M

Crew
- Crew size: 6
- Members: Expedition 42/43: Anton Shkaplerov; Samantha Cristoforetti; Terry W. Virts Expedition 43/44: Gennady Padalka; Mikhail Korniyenko; Scott Kelly
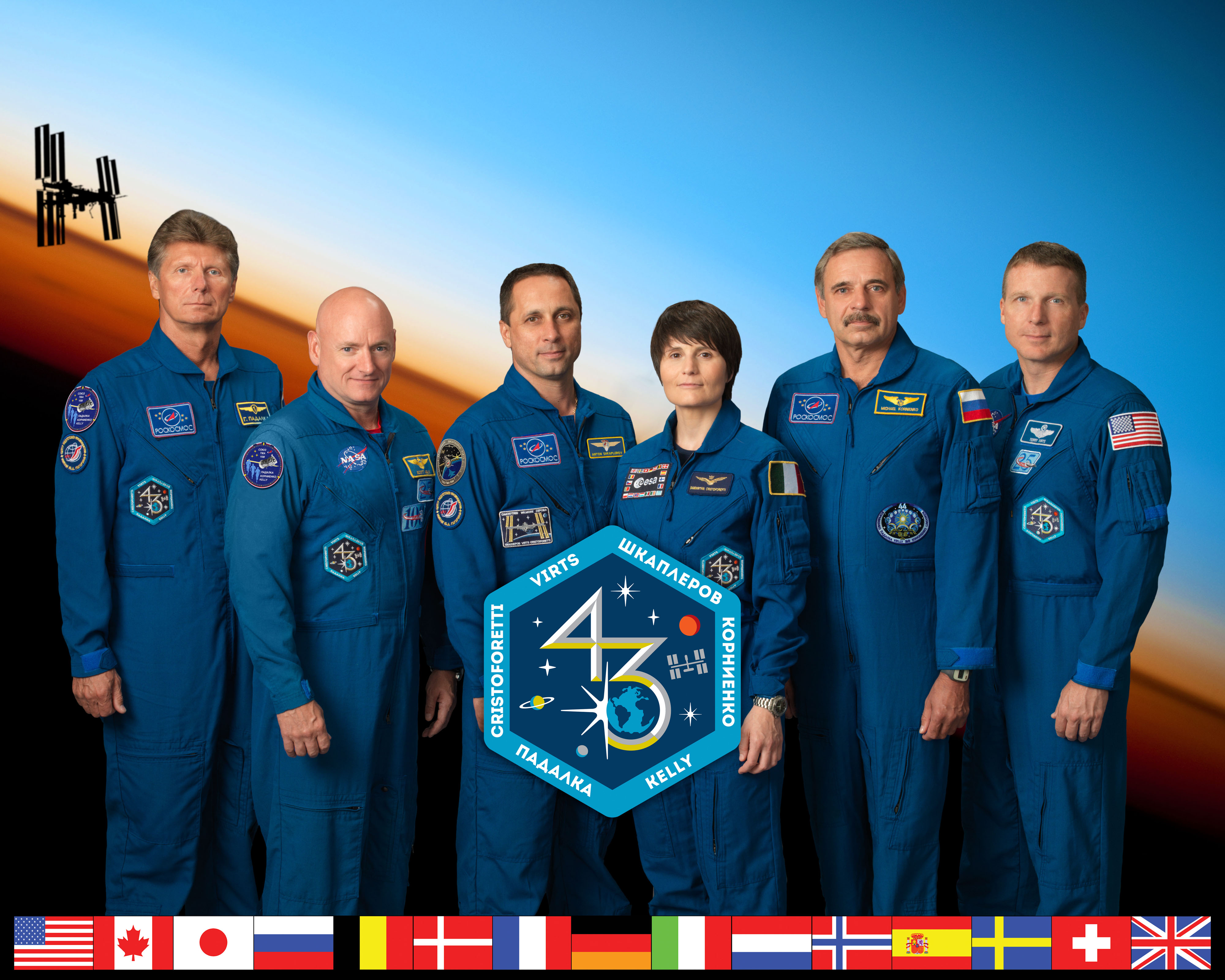
- Expedition 43 mission patch (l-r) Padalka, Kelly, Shkaplerov, Cristoforetti, Kornienko, Virts ISS expeditions

Expedition 43 was the 43rd expedition to the International Space Station. It commenced on 11 March 2015 with the undocking of Soyuz TMA-14M, returning the crew of Expedition 42 to Earth and ended with the departure of Soyuz TMA-15M on 11 June 2015.

The Expedition 43 crew spent an extra "bonus month" on board pending investigation of the Progress M-27M cargo spacecraft failure. On June 8, 2015 ISS adjusted its orbit to move to a safe distance from a piece of orbital space debris.

This expedition also used the ISSpresso machine and tested a special cup designed to be drunk from in microgravity by using capillary flow. This was a further development of a zero gravity cup invented by astronaut Donald Pettit and tested on ISS in 2008. The new zero g coffee cup idea was further developed by a Fluid physicist at Portland State University among others.

== Crew ==
Position	First Part (March 2015)	Second Part (March 2015 to June 2015)
Commander	Terry W. Virts, Jr., NASA; Second and last spaceflight	
Flight engineer	Anton Shkaplerov, RSA; Second spaceflight	
Flight engineer	Samantha Cristoforetti, ASI-ESA; First spaceflight	
Flight engineer		Gennady Padalka, RSA; Fifth and last spaceflight
Flight engineer		Mikhail Korniyenko, RSA; Second and last spaceflight
Flight engineer		Scott Kelly, NASA; Fourth and last spaceflight

Source
Spacefacts

Yury Lonchakov was originally supposed to be the Flight Engineer 3. However, he resigned from the Russian Federal Space Agency on September 6, 2013, to take a position at Gazprom. He was also originally supposed to be the commander of Expedition 44.

== View of Earth ==
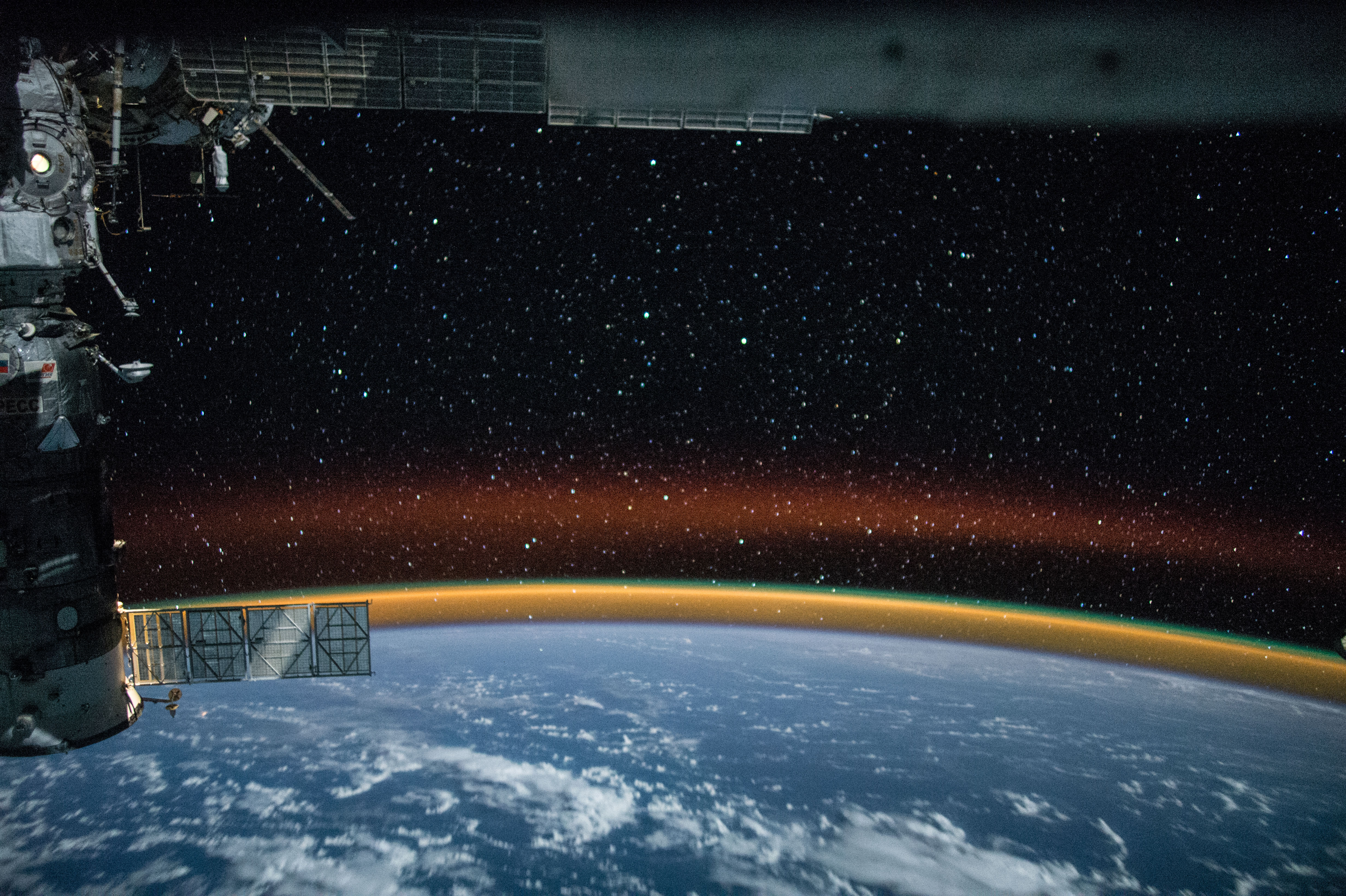
View of Earth taken during ISS Expedition 43

== Cupola view ==
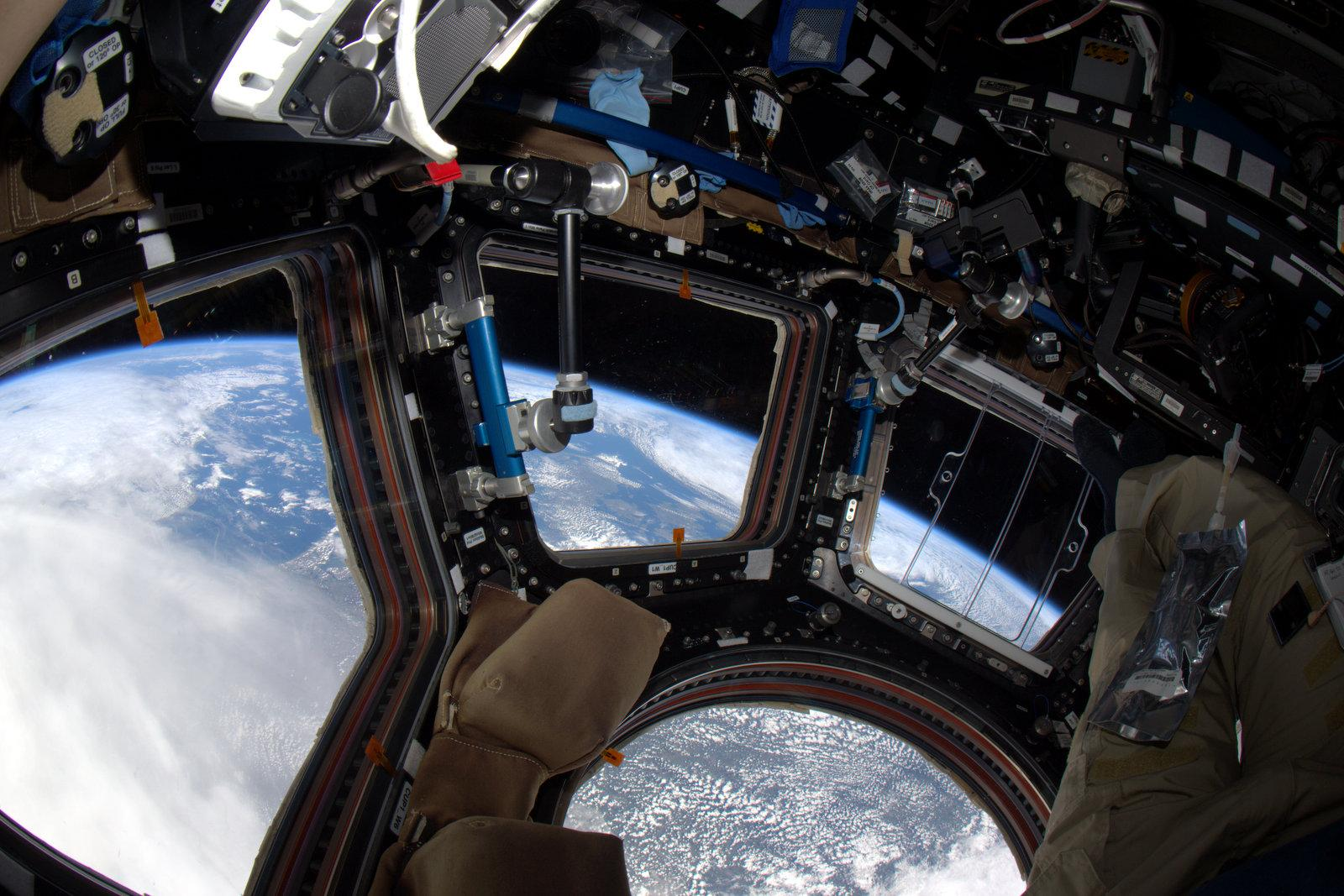
View of Earth from the Cupola during Expedition 43

== See also ==
- ISS year long mission
