= Kazakh space program =

Overview of the space program of Kazakhstan

The space program of Kazakhstan is originated from the dissolution of the Soviet Union in 1991, when Kazakhstan declared their independence. The Kazakh space program consist of cosmonaut and satellite missions. The only launch site situated at Kazakhstan is Baikonur Cosmodrome, which is leased to Russia. The program is led by KazCosmos since 2007.

== History ==
The first Kazakh person to go to space is Toktar Aubakirov in 1991, followed by Talgat Musabayev in 1994. On 7 January 2000, the government of Kazakhstan decreed it would form a cosmonaut corps. Out of 2000 candidates, two were selected, Aidyn Aimbetov and Mukhtar Aymakhanov, in 2002. Aymakhanov left Kazakhstan in 2012 to become a Russian citizen to pursue a cosmonaut career. Aimbetov was selected for Soyuz TMA-18M/Soyuz TMA-16M in June 2015.

On 18 June 2006, the KazSat-1 was launched from Baikonur Cosmodrome, marking the beginning of Kazakhstan's independent inflight space operations. In 2008 communications with the satellite ended, and it was declared lost. The next satellite, KazSat-2, experienced a series of delays, but was launched on 16 July 2011 on board a Proton rocket. KazSat-2 was built by Krunichev and Thales Alenia Space. KazCosmos signed a contract with ISS-Reshetnev and Thales Alenia Space Italy on 21 June 2011 for the third telecommunications satellite, named KazSat-3 and launched it in 2014. Two more satellites, KazEOSat 2 and Al Farabi-1, were launched on 29 June 2014 and 15 February 2017, respectively.

== Launch site ==
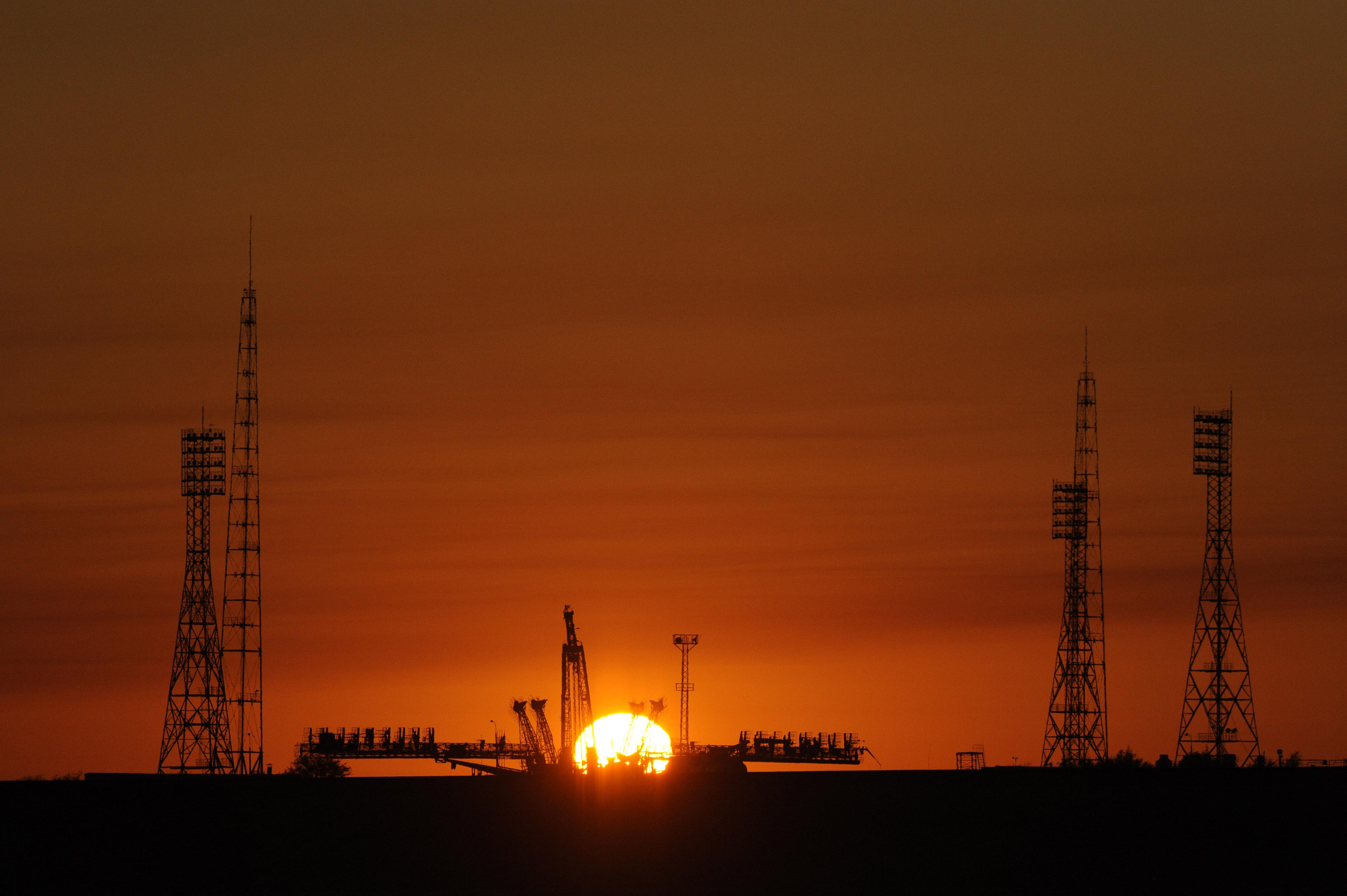
The Cosmodrome's "Gagarin's Start" launchpad on 10 October 2008, prior to the rollout of Soyuz TMA-13

The Baikonur Cosmodrome (Note: Kazakh: Байқоңыр ғарыш айлағы, romanized: Baiqoñyr ğaryş ailağy [bɑjqoˈŋɤr ʁɑˈrəʃ ɑjɫɑˈʁə]; Russian: Космодром Байконур, romanized: Kosmodrom Baykonur [kəsmɐˈdrom bəjkɐˈnur]) is a spaceport operated by Russia within Kazakhstan. Located in the Kazakh city of Baikonur, it is the largest operational space launch facility in terms of area. All Russian crewed spaceflights are launched from Baikonur.

Situated in the Kazakh Steppe, some 90 metres (300 ft) above sea level, it is 200 kilometres (120 mi) to the east of the Aral Sea and north of the Syr Darya. It is close to Töretam, a station on the Trans-Aral Railway. Russia, as the official successor state to the Soviet Union, has retained control over the facility since 1991; it originally assumed this role through the post-Soviet Commonwealth of Independent States (CIS), but ratified an agreement with Kazakhstan in 2005 that allowed it to lease the spaceport until 2050. It is jointly managed by Roscosmos and the Russian Aerospace Forces.

In 1955, the Soviet Ministry of Defense issued a decree and founded the Baikonur Cosmodrome. It was originally built as the chief base of operations for the Soviet space program. The Cosmodrome served as the launching point for Sputnik 1 and Vostok 1. The launchpad used for both missions was renamed "Gagarin's Start" in honour of Soviet cosmonaut Yuri Gagarin, who piloted Vostok 1 and became the first human in outer space. As of 2015 under Russian management, Baikonur is a spaceport, with numerous commercial, military, and scientific missions being launched annually.
