= KazCosmos =

Kazakh space agency

- Қазақстан Республикасы Ұлттық ғарыш агенттiгi (Kazakh)

Agency overview
- Formed: 24 March 2007; 19 years ago
- Type: Space agency
- Jurisdiction: Government of Kazakhstan
- Headquarters: Astana, Kazakhstan
- Administrator: Talgat Musabayev
- Primary spaceport: Baikonur Cosmodrome
- Website: kazcosmos.gov.kz

The National Space Agency of the Republic of Kazakhstan (Kazakh: Қазақстан Республикасы Ұлттық ғарыш агенттiгi, romanized: Qazaqstan Respublikasy Ūlttyq ğaryş agenttıgı), also known as KazCosmos, or KazKosmos, is Kazakhstan's national space agency, and was officially established on 27 March 2007.

== History ==
=== Cosmonaut corps ===
On 7 January 2000, the Kazakh government decreed it would form a cosmonaut corps. At that time, two Kazakh cosmonauts had already flown, Toktar Aubakirov in 1991, and Talgat Musabayev (1994, 1998; later 2001). Out of 2000 candidates, two were selected, Aidyn Aimbetov and Mukhtar Aymakhanov, in 2002. They were sent to Star City for training from 2003 until 2009, when the world financial crisis indefinitely postponed the spaceflight. In 2009, they returned to work in KazCosmos. They had originally been projected for a spaceflight in 2005 or 2006. Aymakhanov left Kazakhstan in 2012 to become a Russian citizen to pursue a cosmonaut career. Aimbetov was still ready for spaceflight in April 2015, and had originally been projected to fly on a 2017 launch. In June 2015, he was selected as the replacement for Sarah Brightman on Soyuz TMA-18M/Soyuz TMA-16M, who had declined to fly, and her backup Satoshi Takamatsu also declined. He launched from Baikonur on 2 September 2015, docked with the International Space Station, and returned on 11 September 2015, touching down on the Kazakhstan Steppe, having spent 10 days in space.

=== Satellites ===
The year prior to establishment, on 18 June 2006, the communications satellite KazSat-1 was launched from Baikonur Cosmodrome, marking the beginning of Kazakhstan's independent inflight space operations. In 2008 communications with the satellite ended, and it was declared lost. The next planned satellite, KazSat-2, experienced a series of delays, but was launched on 16 July 2011 on board a Proton rocket. KazSat-2 was built by Krunichev and Thales Alenia Space Italy. KazCosmos signed a contract with ISS-Reshetnev and Thales Alenia Space Italy on 21 June 2011 for the third telecommunications satellite, named KazSat-3 and launched it in 2014.

== Operations ==
The head of the agency, Talgat Musabayev, is a veteran of three spaceflights, including two long-duration stays aboard the Russian space station Mir. Musabayev says that the Baikonur Cosmodrome, which is in Kazakhstan, is the main component of the cooperation between the Russian and Kazakh space programs. The Russians still heavily use Baikonur for launches.

== See also ==
- List of government space agencies
- Kazakh space program
