= Mukhtar Aymakhanov =

Kazakh-Russian cosmonaut

- Мухтар Аймаханов (Russian); Мұхтар Аймаханов (Kazakh)
- Born: 1 January 1967 (age 59); Josaly, Kazakh SSR, Soviet Union
- Education: Chernihiv Higher Military Aviation School for Pilots

Mukhtar Rabatovich Aymakhanov (Note: Russian: Мухтар Рабатович Аймаханов; Kazakh: Мұхтар Рабатұлы Аймаханов, romanized: Mūhtar Rabatūly Aimahanov) (born 1 January 1967) is a Russian cosmonaut; he was originally a Kazakhstan cosmonaut.

== Kazakh cosmonaut career ==
Aimakhanov and Aidyn Aimbetov were selected as the first class of Kazakh cosmonauts in 2002, for the Kazakhstan National Space Agency, KazCosmos. They trained at Star City as cosmonauts from 2003 to 2009, until the world financial crisis indefinitely postponed the prospective Kazakhstan mission.

The Kazakh mission finally took place in September 2015 aboard Soyuz TMA-18M after prospective Space tourist Sarah Brightman pulled out from the flight. Aimbetov flew with Russian cosmonaut Sergey Prokopyev as his backup since Aymakhanov had already left KazCosmos and joined Roscosmos by the time of the flight.

On December 28, 2022, he left the position of a test cosmonaut in the Roscosmos cosmonaut squad after the decision of the Main Medical Commission. He will continue to work at the Gagarin Cosmonaut Training Center as a leading specialist in cosmonaut training.

== Russian cosmonaut career ==
In 2012, to pursue his cosmonaut dreams, Aymakhanov became a Russian citizen, and gave up his Kazakhstan citizenship.
