= Sergey Volkov (cosmonaut) =

Russian cosmonaut and engineer (born 1973)

- Сергей Волков
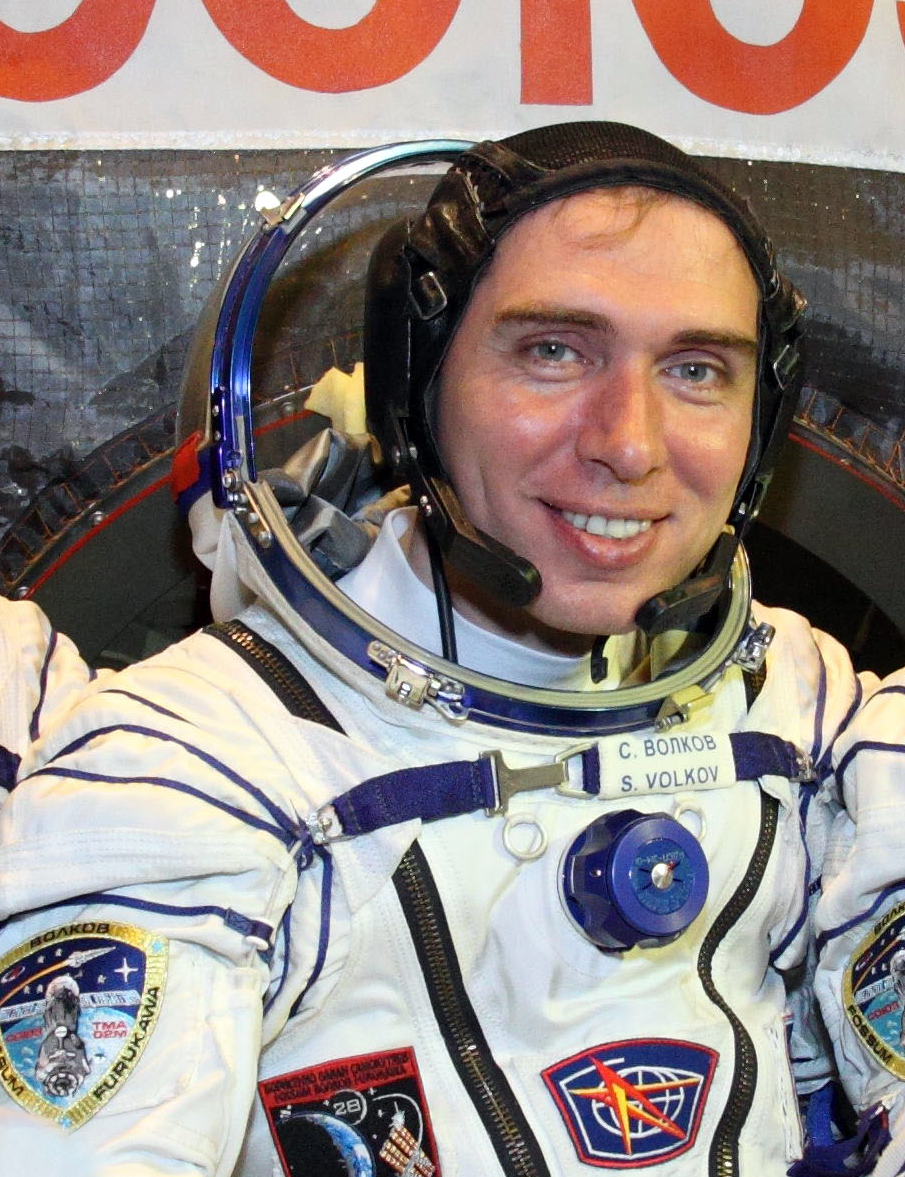
- Born: 1 April 1973 (age 53); Chuhuiv, Ukrainian SSR, Soviet Union
- Occupation: Fighter pilot
- Awards: Hero of the Russian Federation
- Space career

RKA Cosmonaut
- Status: Retired
- Rank: Colonel, Russian Air Force
- Time in space: 547 days 22 hours 21 minutes
- Selection: 1997 TsPK Cosmonaut Group
- Total EVAs: 4
- Total EVA time: 23 hours and 20 minutes
- Missions: Soyuz TMA-12 (Expedition 17), Soyuz TMA-02M (Expedition 28/29), Soyuz TMA-18M (Expedition 45/46)
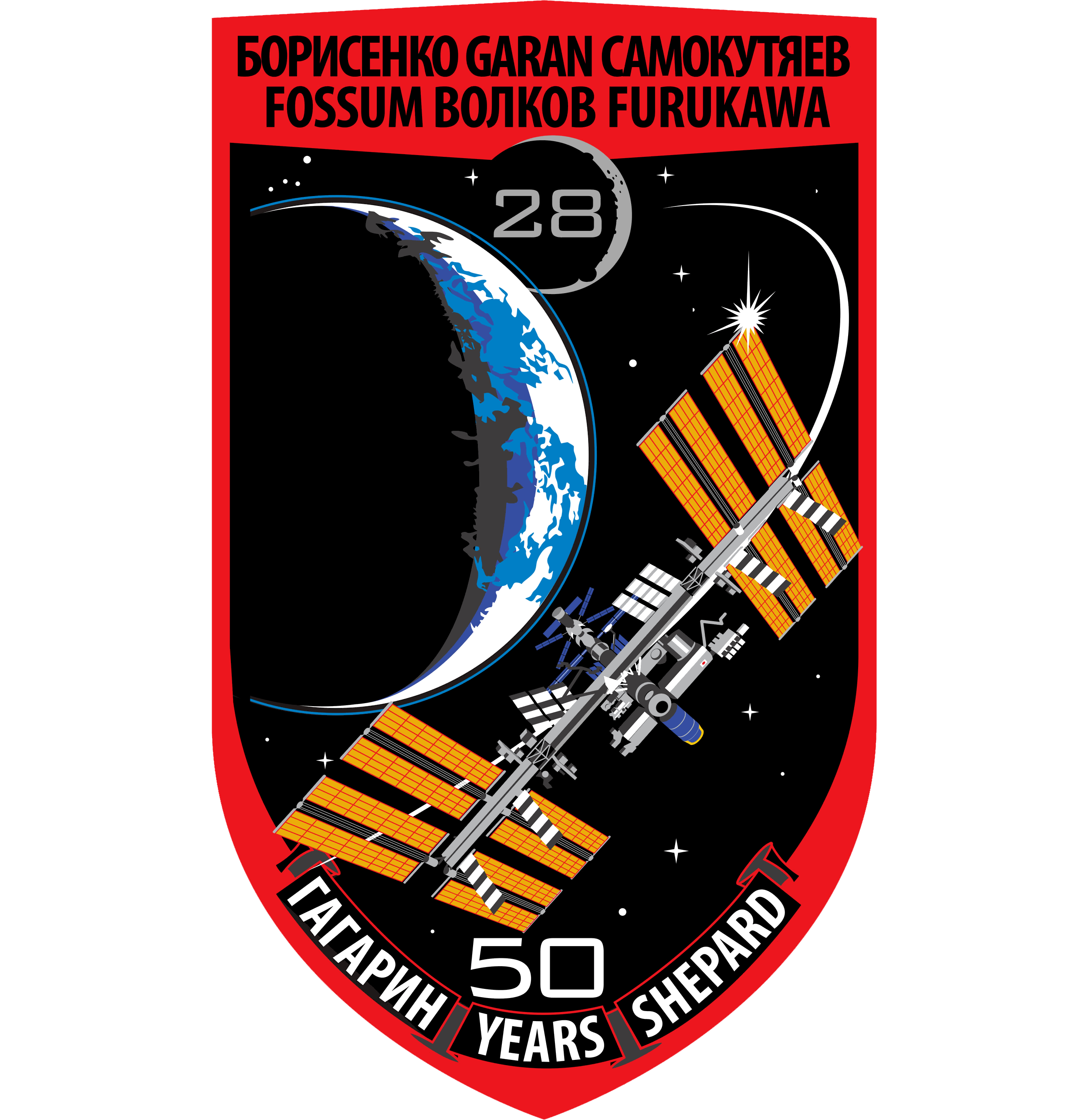
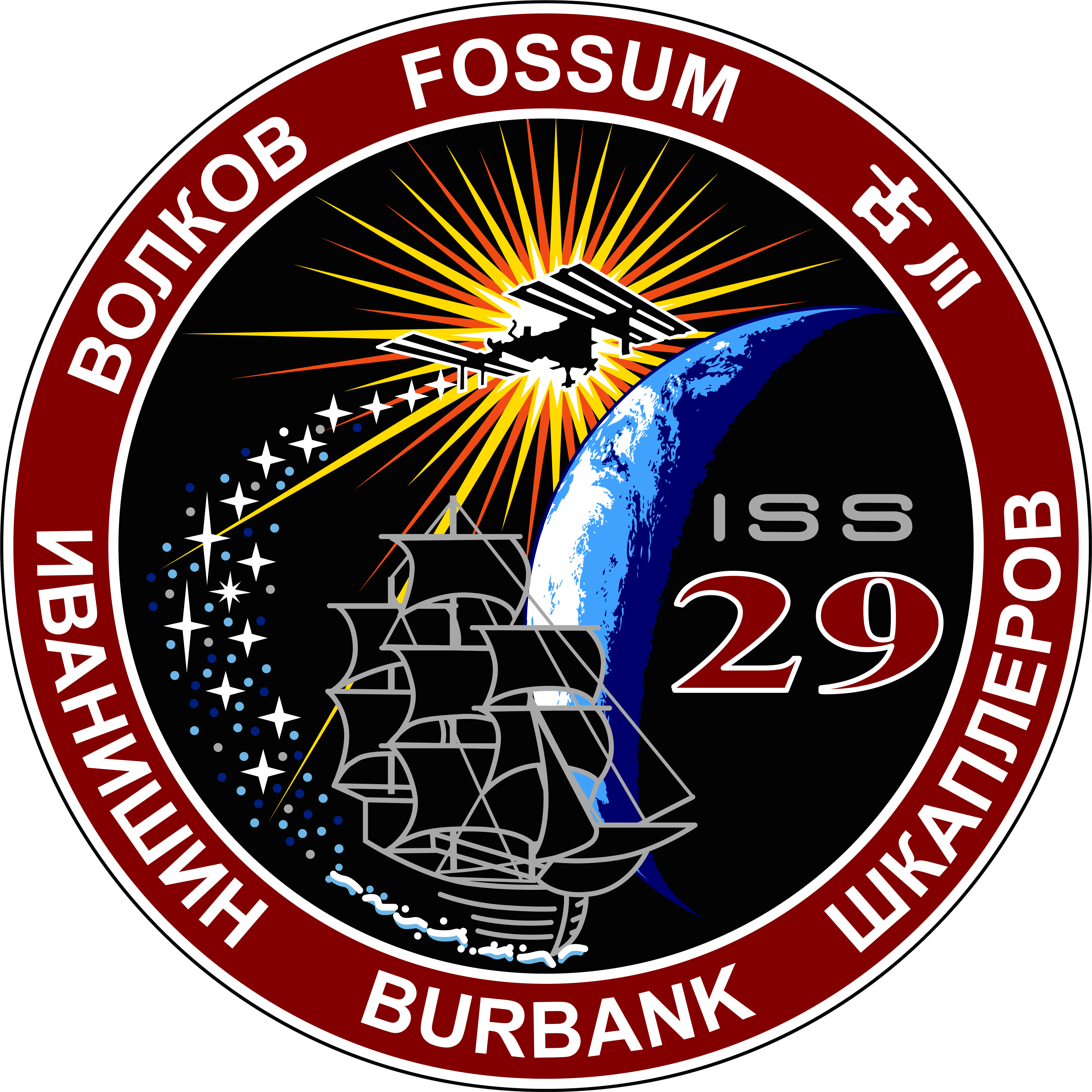
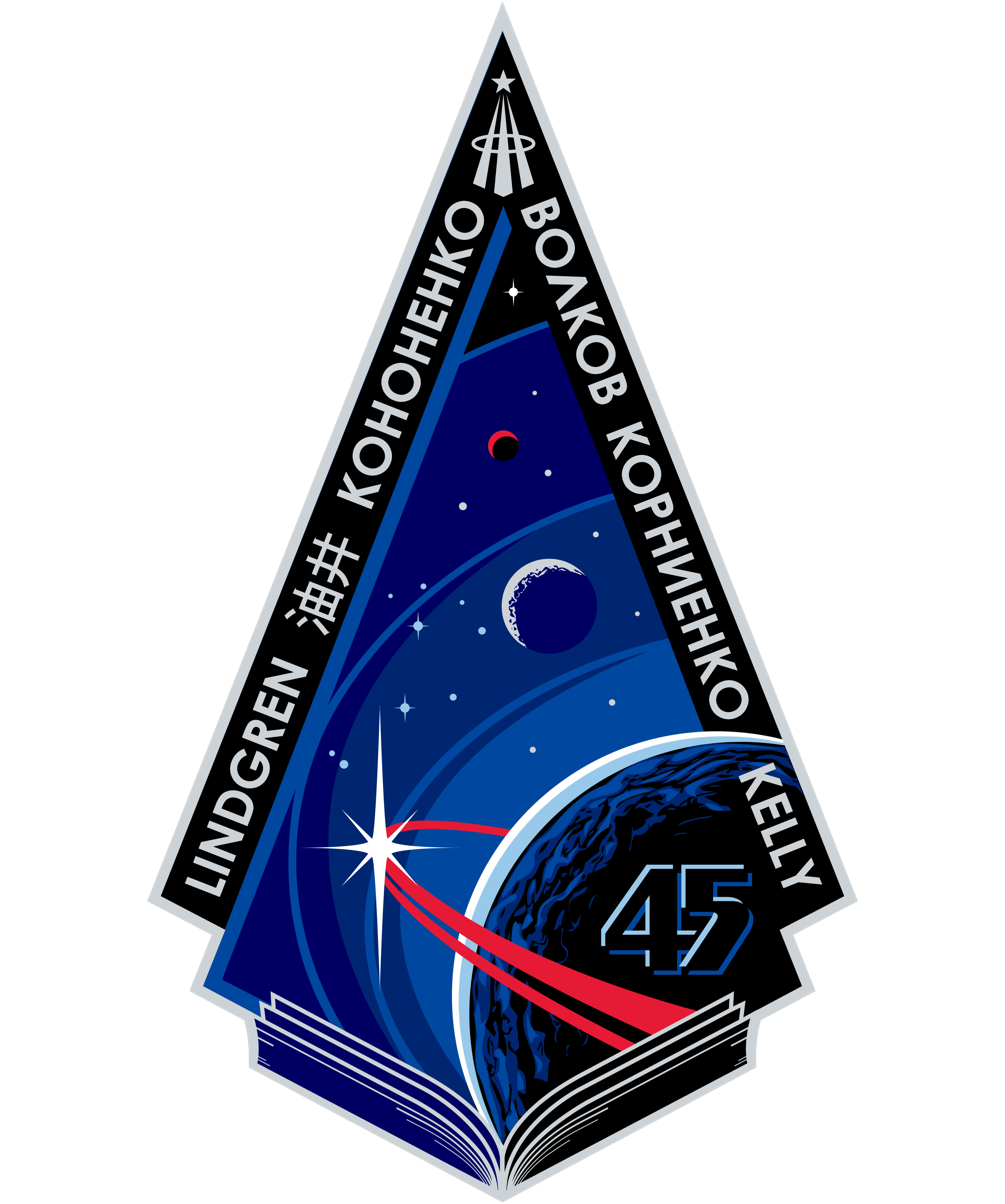
- Mission insignia
- Retired: February 28, 2017

Sergey Aleksandrovich Volkov (Russian: Сергей Александрович Волков; born 1 April 1973) is a retired Russian cosmonaut and engineer. He was a member of three missions to the International Space Station, spending more than a year in total in space. During his missions he did four spacewalks lasting more than 23 hours in total. Volkov retired from the cosmonaut group in February 2017.

== Personal ==
Volkov is the first second-generation cosmonaut (and space walker), the son of cosmonaut Aleksandr Volkov. He was born on 1 April 1973 in Chuhuiv, Kharkiv Oblast, Ukraine. Volkov and his wife Natalia have a son who was born in 2001. His recreational activities include tennis, windsurfing, reading, and visiting museums.

== Education ==
Volkov graduated from Star City high school in 1990 and entered the Tambov Air Force Academy for Pilots. He graduated in 1995 with a degree of pilot/engineer.

== Awards ==
Volkov was awarded the Hero of the Russian Federation medal and Russian Federation Armed Forces medals.

== Experience ==
After graduating from Tambov Air Force Academy, Volkov served in the air force as an assistant aircraft commander. He has mastered the Aero L-29 and L-39, the Ilyushin Il-22, and the Tupolev Tu-134, and has also accumulated 450 flight hours. He is a Class 3 military pilot.

== Cosmonaut career ==
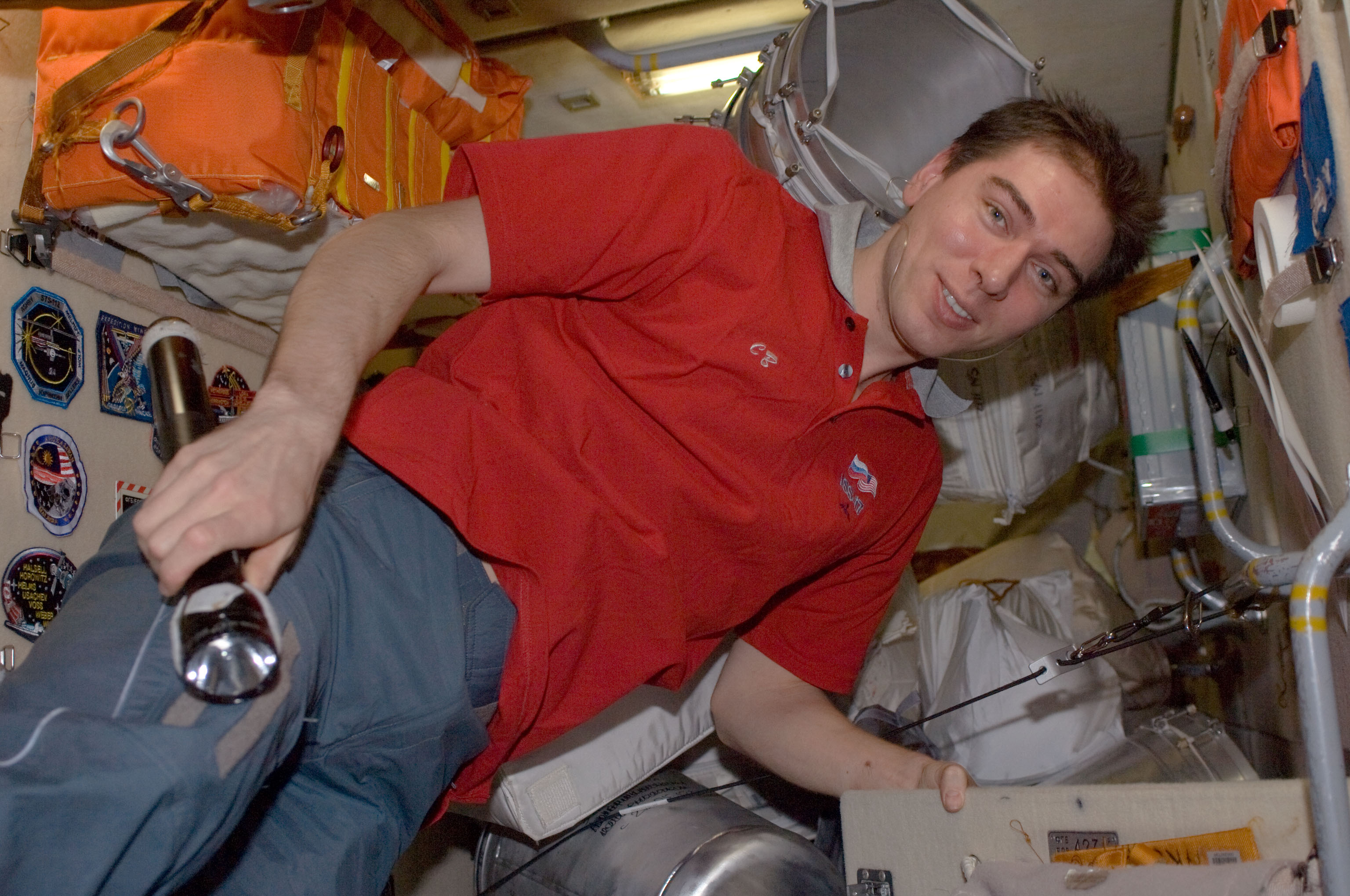
Sergei Volkov in the Zarya module of the ISS

From December 1997 to November 1999, Volkov underwent general cosmonaut training, and in November 1999, was qualified as a test cosmonaut. Since January 2000, he has been part of a group of test cosmonauts training for missions to the International Space Station (ISS).

From August 2001 to February 2003, Volkov trained as part of the Expedition 7 backup crew as a Soyuz-TMA Commander and ISS Flight Engineer. From March 2003 to December 2004, he trained as part of the Expedition 11 primary crew for launch on the Space Shuttle. From January 2005 to February 2006, he trained as part of a group of test cosmonauts for missions to the ISS. In February 2006, he was appointed as a member of the Expedition 13 backup crew and Visiting Crew 10 as a Soyuz TMA Flight Engineer 2 and an ISS Visiting Crew Flight Engineer.

=== Expedition 17 ===
In June 2006, he was appointed a member of the Expedition 17 prime crew as Soyuz TMA Commander and ISS Commander. The Soyuz TMA-12 spacecraft carrying Volkov along with fellow cosmonaut Oleg Kononenko and South Korean spaceflight participant Yi So-Yeon blasted into space on 8 April 2008. Volkov served as the commander of the ISS expedition 17. He is the youngest ISS commander to date. His mission lasted from April to October 2008.

Volkov, Kononeko and space tourist Richard Garriott, the son of astronaut Owen K. Garriott returned to Earth aboard Soyuz TMA-12 on 24 October 2008. Garriott is the first second-generation American space explorer. The spacecraft landed at 03:36 GMT 55 miles north of Arkalyk, Kazakhstan. Later they were lifted to the Kazakhstan Baikonur Cosmodrome by helicopter and then flown to Zvezdny Gorodok (Star City) in Moscow.

=== Expedition 28/29 ===
On 7 June 2011 (UTC) Volkov returned to space aboard Soyuz TMA-02M to join the crew of Expedition 28. Expedition 28 crews worked with 111 experiments involving approximately 200 researchers across a variety of fields, including human life sciences, physical sciences and Earth observation, and conduct technology demonstrations ranging from recycling to robotics. Seventy-three of these experiments are sponsored by NASA, including 22 under the auspices of the U.S. National Laboratory program, and 38 are sponsored by international partners. More than 540 hours of research are planned. As with prior expeditions, many experiments are designed to gather information about the effects of long-duration spaceflight on the human body, which will help us understand complicated processes such as immune systems with a plan for future exploration missions. The station command changed from US astronaut Michael Fossum to US astronaut Daniel Burbank. With undocking of Soyuz TMA-02M, carrying Volkov, Fossum and Satoshi Furukawa on 21 November 2011 at 23:00 UTC the Expedition 29 concluded and the new ISS Expedition 30 began. An EVA by Volkov and crewmate Aleksandr Samokutyayev occurred on 3 August 2011 to move a small crane, install a communications terminal and remove and inspect antennas. Other tasks included installing a materials science experiment and deploying a micro-satellite. The duration of the spacewalk was 6 hours 23 minutes.

=== Spacewalks ===
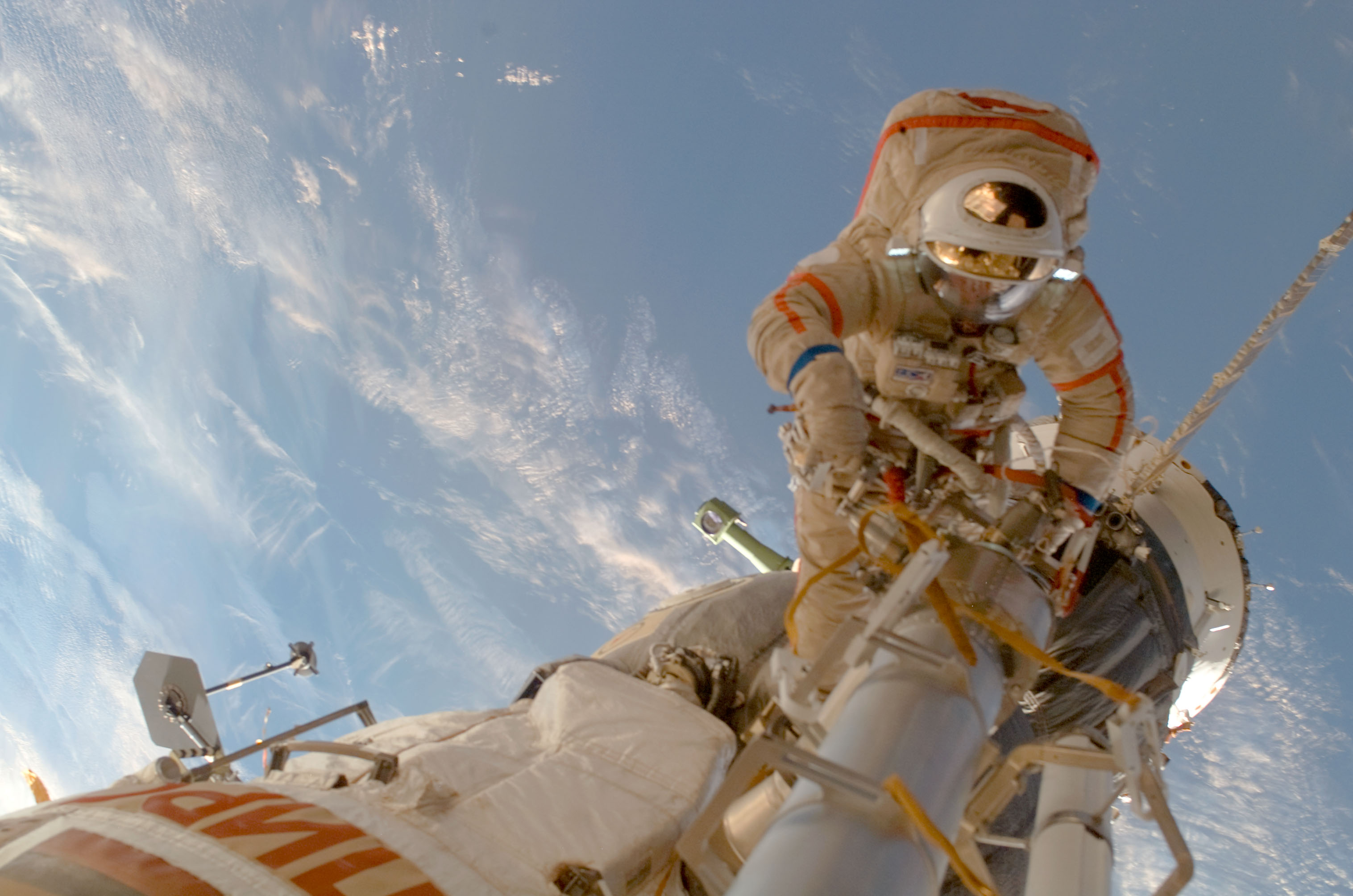
On 15 July 2008 Volkov participated in his second spacewalk.

Volkov conducted his first spacewalk on 10 July 2008 when he ventured into space from the Pirs docking compartment airlock of the ISS. He and cosmonaut Kononenko inspected their Soyuz TMA-12 spacecraft and retrieved a pyro bolt from it. The spacewalk lasted 6 hours and 18 minutes and Volkov served as the lead spacewalker.

On 15 July 2008 Volkov, together with Kononenko, again went outside from Pirs to conduct a spacewalk. The two spacewalking cosmonauts installed one experiment and retrieved another. They also continued to outfit the station's exterior, including the installation of a docking target on the Zvezda service module. The spacewalk was in Russian Orlan suits and Volkov, as the lead spacewalker wore the suit with red stripes. This spacewalk lasted 5 hours and 54 minutes.

An EVA by Volkov and crewmate Aleksandr Samokutyayev occurred on 3 August 2011 to move a small crane, install a communications terminal and remove and inspect antennas. Other tasks included installing a materials science experiment and deploying a micro-satellite. The duration of the spacewalk was 6 hours 23 minutes.

The fourth EVA of Volkov's career was during Expedition 46, with veteran cosmonaut Yuri Malenchenko. The spacewalkers performed works with the experiment Test at two locations: they took away samples from the outer surface of the docking compartment Pirs hatch and in the area of the cover window #8 at the service module Zvezda. The goal of the experiments was to develop methods for detecting leaks and control of elements of the exterior surface of the ISS. The cosmonauts also dismantled a monoblock responsible for exposing samples of organic and biological materials in open space (experiment Expose-R) and set the unit samples #2 from an experiment for the study of space influence on the mechanical properties of materials. At the same module, they had to replace a removable cassette container, where the samples are placed on the exterior of stations in conditions of prolonged exposure, change the orientation of the pressure control unit on the module Poisk. One of the important tasks were works on an experiment with the goal to develop technologies for sticking film thermal control coating, secure package screen-vacuum thermal insulation on the surface to be repaired and transactions that require bonding film materials in space flight. For more convenient travel on the outer surface of the ISS the spacewalkers installed handrails on the soft part of the conical device of the Functional Cargo Block Zarya. Upon completion of the main tasks, the cosmonauts started a photo documentation of the external surface of the ISS Russian segment. The spacewalk concluded after 4 hours 45 minutes.

=== Russian EVA #28 ===
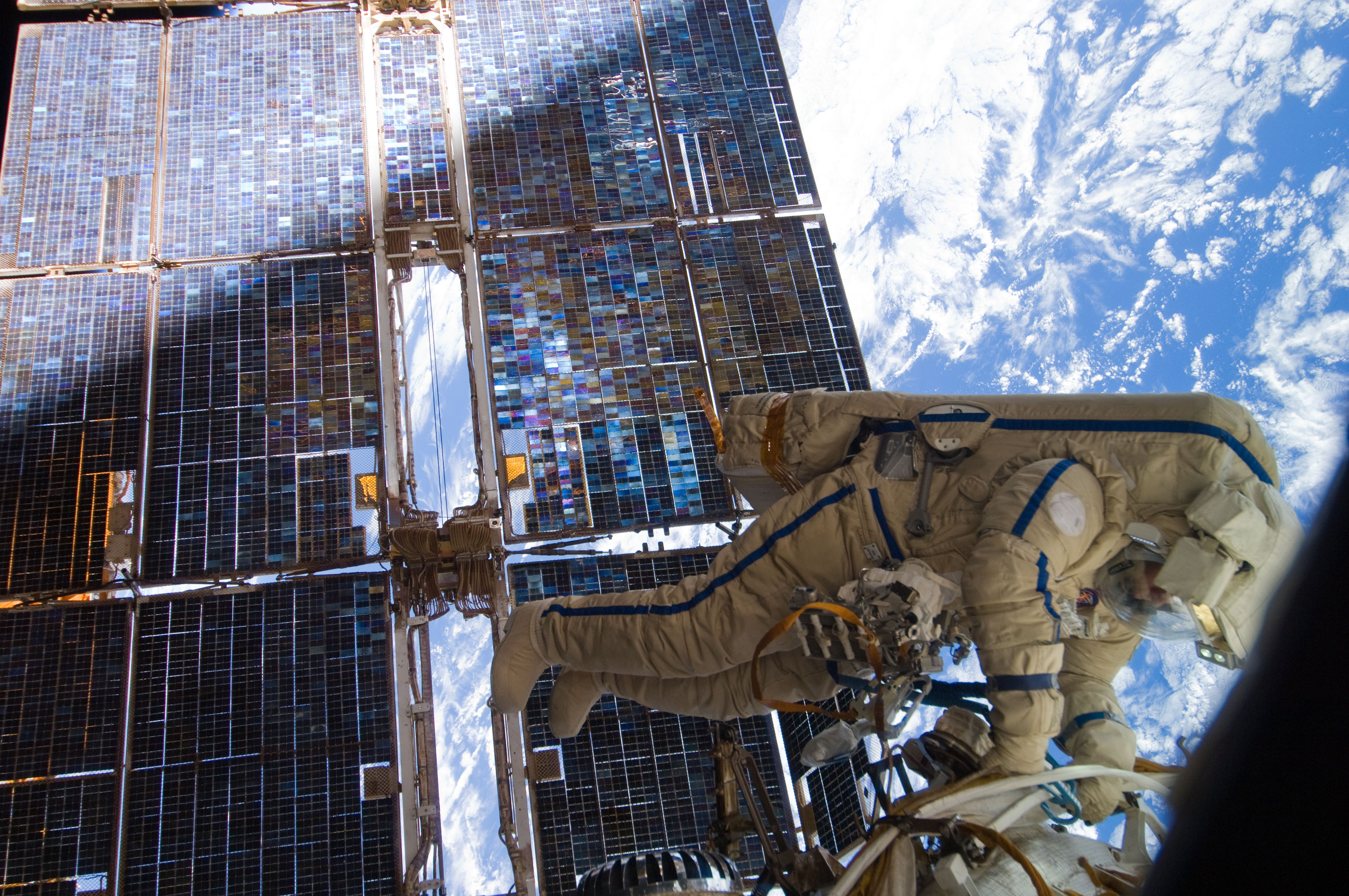
Volkov attired in a Russian Orlan spacesuit, participates in Russian EVA # 28 on 3 August 2011

On 3 August 2011 Volkov participated in his third spacewalk. He and cosmonaut Aleksandr Samokutyayev worked for six hours and 23 minutes performing a variety of tasks for both science and maintenance outside the Russian segment of the ISS. Outside the Zvezda service module, Volkov and Samokutyayev installed laser communications equipment. They also photographed an antenna with signs of degraded performance. After ground controllers took time to work on an antenna problem, the two cosmonauts also deployed a small satellite named Radioskaf-V which was originally planned for deployment at the beginning of the spacewalk. The satellite contained an amateur radio transmitter and a student experiment. The primary task of the spacewalk the relocation of the Strela 1 boom from the Pirs module to the Poisk module, had to be called off due to time constraints. The cosmonauts removed an antenna that helped guide the Poisk module to a docking in November 2009 and was returned to the ISS at the end of the spacewalk. They also successfully installed the materials science experiment – BIORISK on a handrail outside the Pirs module. BIORISK experiment studies the effect of microbes on spacecraft structures and whether solar activity affects microbial growth. Finally, Volkov and Samokutyayev took more photographs holding photos of the first cosmonaut Yury Gagarin, spacecraft designer Sergei Korolyov and Soviet astronautic theory pioneer Konstantin Tsiolkovsky with Earth in the background before entering the Pirs module, closing the hatch and completing the Russian EVA #28.

=== Lawsuit with the Yuri Gagarin Cosmonaut Training Center ===
In February 2012, the Russian Government excluded the Yuri Gagarin Cosmonaut Training Center from the list of organizations served by military officers. All military personnel serving as cosmonauts were forced to retire from military service and become civilian specialists at significantly lower rates of pay (the premium for military officers working as cosmonauts was between 55% and 120% of their nominal salaries). Sergey Volkov successfully sued the training center, winning back 1,382,000 Russian roubles (approximately $40,000) in lost pay.

=== Expedition 45/46 ===
Volkov launched for his third trip to the ISS as commander of Soyuz TMA-18M alongside visiting crew members Andreas Mogensen and Aidyn Aimbetov on 2 September 2015. They docked to the Poisk Module 2 days later (a higher station orbit prevented the normal 6 hr rendezvous from being possible) on 4 September. Mogensen and Aimbetov landed on Soyuz TMA-16M while Volkov remained onboard until March 2016 when he landed with Scott Kelly and Mikhail Korniyenko. The fourth EVA of Volkov's career was during Expedition 46 with veteran cosmonaut Yuri Malenchenko. The duration was 4 hours 45 minutes. With the undocking of Soyuz TMA-18M, carrying Volkov, Korniyenko, and Kelly on 2 March 2016 at 01:02:48 UTC, Expedition 46 concluded, and Expedition 47 began. The landing of TMA-18M occurred two and half hours later, which concluded the 11-month mission of Kelly and Korniyenko.

== See also ==
- List of Heroes of the Russian Federation

Preceded by Peggy Whitson	ISS Expedition Commander; 17 April 2008 to 24 October 2008	Succeeded by Michael Fincke
