= Andreas Mogensen =

Danish engineer and astronaut (born 1976)

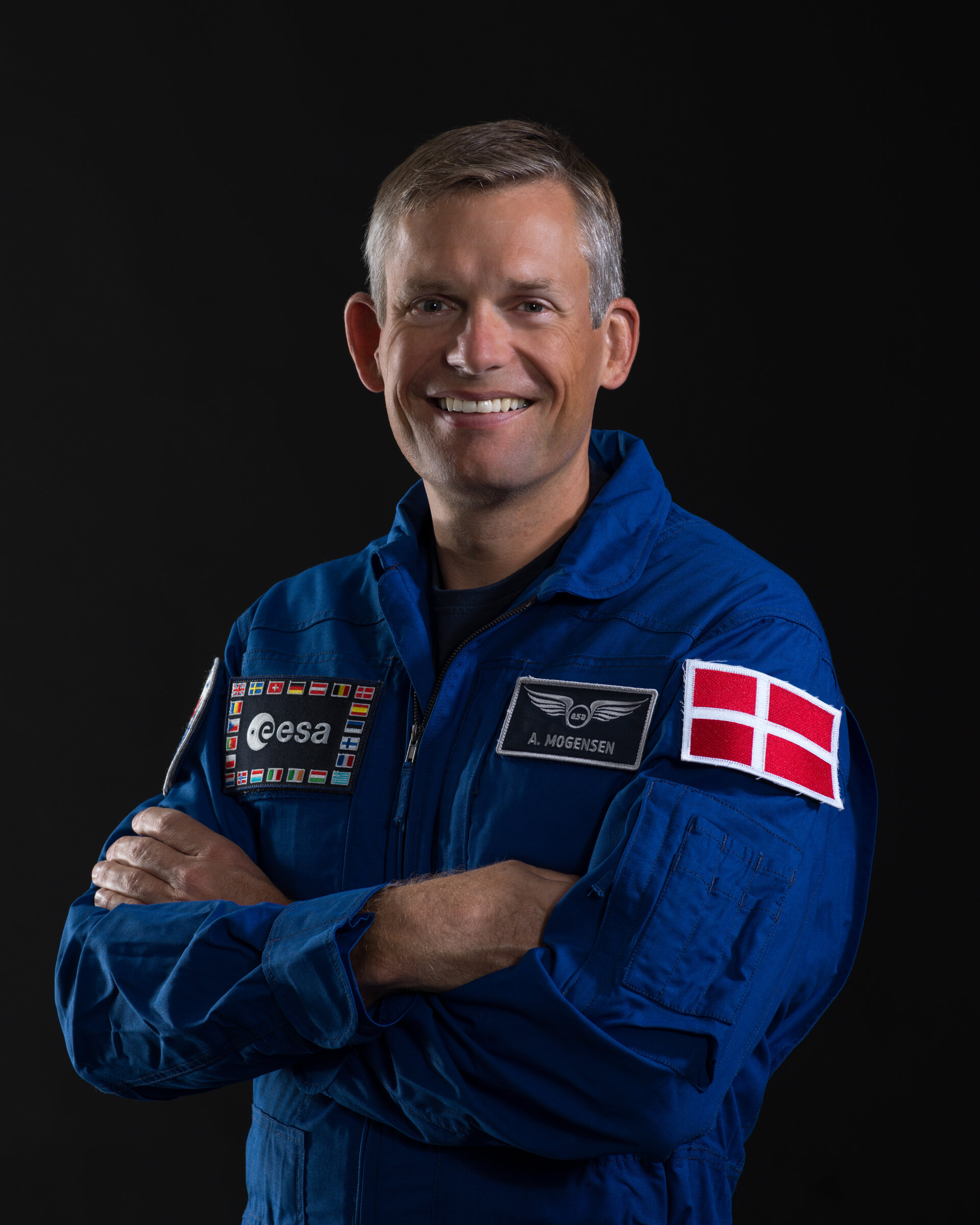
- Mogensen in 2020
- Born: Andreas Enevold Mogensen; 2 November 1976 (age 49); Copenhagen, Denmark
- Education: Imperial College London (MEng); University of Texas at Austin (PhD)
- Occupation: Aerospace engineer
- Spouse: Cecilie Beyer
- Children: 3
- Awards: Royal Medal of Recompense in gold with crown and inscription (2015); NASA Distinguished Public Service Medal (2015)
- Space career

ESA astronaut
- Status: Active
- Time in space: 208 days, 22 hours, 34 minutes
- Selection: 2009 ESA Group
- Missions: Soyuz TMA-18M/TMA-16M; SpaceX Crew-7 (Expedition 69/70)
- Website: andreasmogensen.esa.int

Andreas Enevold "Andy" Mogensen (born 2 November 1976) is a Danish engineer and ESA astronaut who is best known for being the first Dane to fly in space as part of the European Space Agency's Iriss program. Mogensen has also been involved in a number of other space-related projects throughout his career, including working as a test engineer for ESTEC and as a member of the European Astronaut Corps. In addition to his work with ESA, he has also worked with NASA and other international space agencies. He returned to space in August 2023 for his second spaceflight to the ISS onboard SpaceX Crew Dragon as the first non-American to serve as a pilot. He is the current head of the European Astronaut Corps, taking over duties from Frank De Winne in 2025.

== Education and early career ==
He was born in Copenhagen. Mogensen attended primary school at Rygaards International School in Hellerup, where he graduated in 1992. He received an International Baccalaureate from Copenhagen International School in 1995. He then went to the Imperial College London where he obtained an MEng degree in Aeronautical Engineering in 1999. Between 2001 and 2003 he worked as an engineer in the R&D department of Vestas Wind Systems in Denmark. Subsequently, Mogensen earned a PhD degree in Aerospace Engineering at the University of Texas at Austin in 2007. Furthermore, as part of his studies, he spent a semester at the Instituto Superior Técnico - University of Lisbon in Lisbon, Portugal. Mogensen worked in Germany as an altitude and orbit control system and guidance, navigation & control engineer for HE Space Operations associated with the SWARM mission. He furthermore worked as a contractor for EADS Astrium in Portugal at the Institute for Systems and Robotics. In addition, he stayed in a large number of other countries, including Thailand, Singapore, England, Portugal, Congo and the United States. His position when he was selected by ESA was Aerospace Engineering at Surrey Space Centre, University of Surrey.

== Space career ==
=== In ESA ===
Mogensen was selected to become the first Danish astronaut by the European Space Agency in May 2009. He completed initial training and became a member of the European Astronaut Corps in November 2010.

In 2012, Mogensen served as cavenaut in the ESA CAVES training in Sardinia, alongside David Saint-Jaques, Soichi Noguchi, Nikolai Tikhonov, Andrew Feustel, and Michael Fincke. During this training course, he took part in the discovery of Alpioniscus sideralis, a new species of stygofaunal crustaceans.

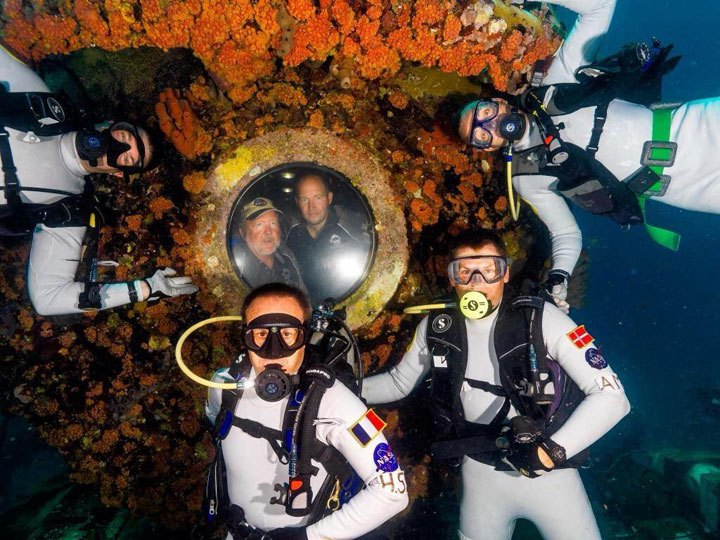
Mogensen (second from right) during NEEMO 19

On 10 June 2014, NASA announced that Mogensen would serve as an aquanaut aboard the Aquarius underwater laboratory during the NEEMO 19 undersea exploration mission, which began on 7 September 2014 and lasted seven days.

Between September and November 2021, Mogensen participated in the fourth edition of ESA PANGAEA training program. Together with the NASA astronaut Kathleen Rubins, Mogensen went to the Italian Dolomites, to the Ries Crater in Germany and the volcanic landscapes of Lanzarote, Spain. ESA's Pangaea program prepares astronauts and space engineers to identify planetary geological features for future missions to the Moon, Mars and asteroids.

=== Iriss ===
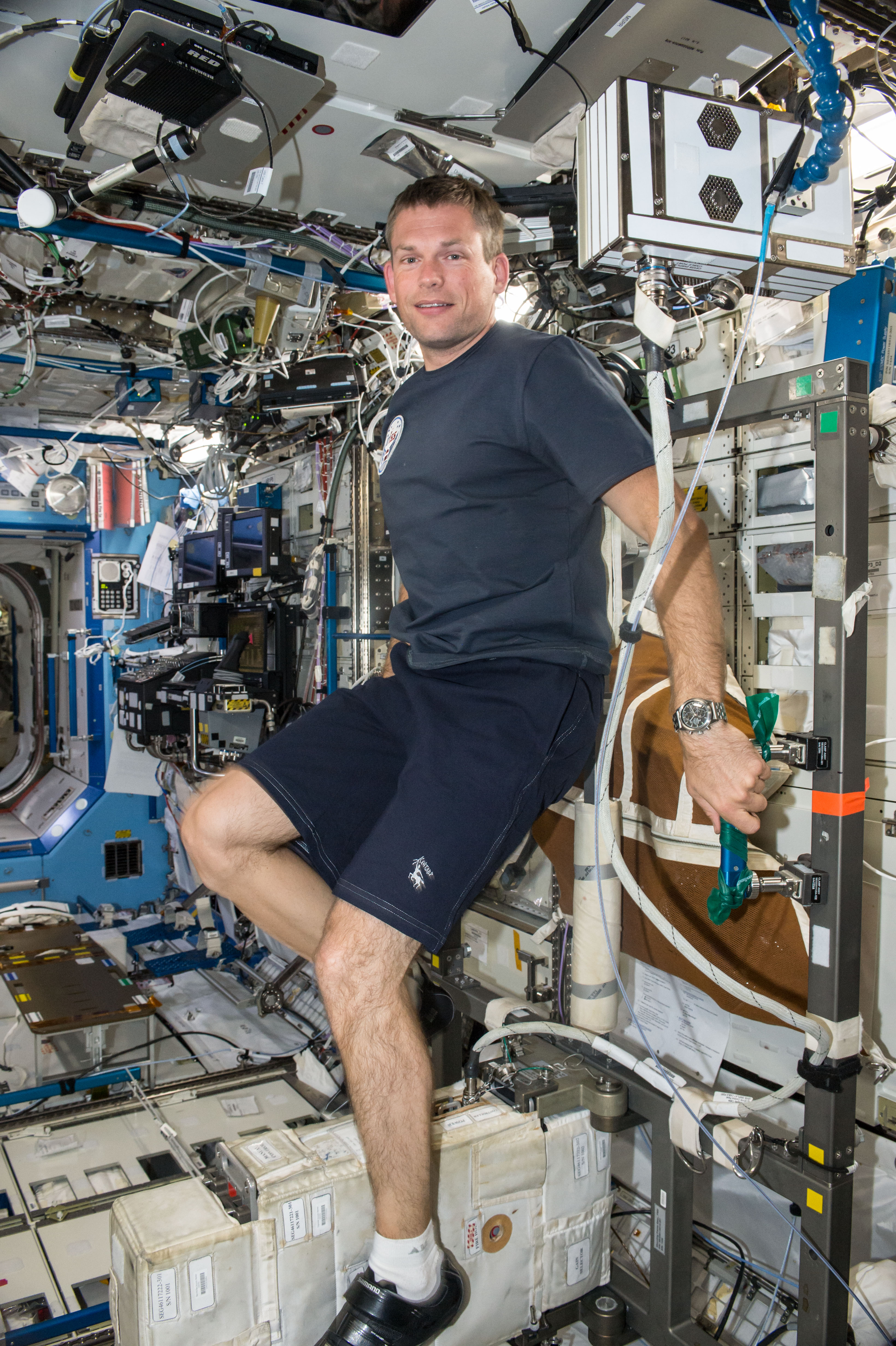
Mogensen exercising in the Destiny Laboratory

Mogensen's mission to the ISS was called "Iriss". The mission name was chosen from suggestions received from across Europe. "Iriss" had two logos, one to highlight the overall mission and one for the educational outreach activities.

On 2 September 2015, Mogensen launched with Soyuz TMA-18M to ISS and landed with Soyuz TMA-16M ten days later. He was traveling with another visiting flight engineer, Aidyn Aimbetov. Among the items Andreas brought along were LEGO figures and a poster for Copenhagen Suborbitals.

Because of the short mission duration, Mogensen worked up to 9.5-hour days instead of the 8-hour workdays that are normal on the station. His missions included remote control of a robot on Earth, and filming Red Sprites and Blue Jets lightnings above thunderclouds, directed from Earth. He also tried a new kind of Skinsuit to alleviate back-pain astronauts feel due to the lengthening of their spine and used augmented reality goggles during his maintenance tasks.

Mogensen left the station on 11 September 2015. Sergey Volkov was the ascent pilot (TMA-18M), and Gennady Padalka was the descent pilot (TMA-16M). The crew landed at 00:51 UTC on 12 September 2015, just over three hours after departing the ISS.

Mogensen received the Danish Royal Medal of Recompense for his efforts.

=== Huginn ===
In March 2022, he was selected as pilot of SpaceX Crew-7. On its launch in August 2023, he became the first European pilot of a spacecraft and the first pilot of a US spacecraft who is not a US citizen. He also served as the ISS Expedition 70 commander. The European segment of the mission is called "Huginn". Crew-7 and Mogensen returned to Earth on 12 March 2024.

== Personal life ==
He resides in Copenhagen, Denmark. His pastimes include rugby, mountaineering, and diving.

Preceded by Sergey Prokopyev	ISS Commander (Expedition 70); 26 September 2023 to 10 March 2024	Succeeded by Oleg Kononenko
