= Aidyn Aimbetov =

Kazakh cosmonaut (born 1972)

- Айдын Айымбетов
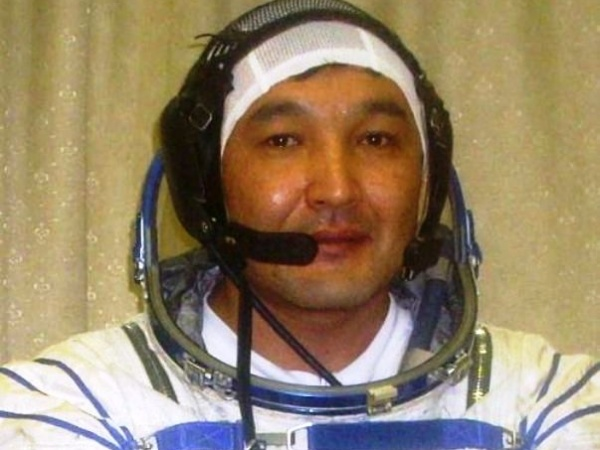
- Born: 27 July 1972 (age 54); Zarya Kommunizma, Taldykorgan District, Kazakh SSR, Soviet Union
- Occupations: Major General, Kazakh Air Force
- Space career

KazCosmos Cosmonaut
- Time in space: 9d 20h 14m
- Selection: Kazakh Cosmonaut Group 1
- Missions: Soyuz TMA-18M / TMA-16M

Aidyn Akanuly Aimbetov (Kazakh: Айдын Ақанұлы Айымбетов, Aidyn Aqanūly Aiymbetov; Russian: Айдын Аканович Аимбетов, born 27 July 1972) is a Kazakh cosmonaut, the first flying as national of independent Kazakhstan. The first from Kazakhstan was Toktar Aubakirov (1991).

== Family ==
Aimbetov is married and has three children, two daughters and a son.

== Military career ==
Aimbetov graduated from Kutakhov Armavir Higher Military Aviation School and became a military pilot, having enrolled after secondary school. He served at Lugovaya and Taldykorgan, flying MiG-27 and Su-27 fighters.

== Cosmonaut career ==
Aimbetov was selected to the first Kazakh cosmonaut class in 2002, along with Mukhtar Aimakhanov, out of a pool of 2,000 candidates. From 2003 to 2009, he trained in Russia as a cosmonaut at Star City. He returned to Astana, in Kazakhstan, after failing to secure a spaceflight. He had been scheduled to fly in autumn 2009, but due to the world financial crisis, this fell through. Aimakhanov remained in Russia, becoming a Russian citizen, making Aimbetov the sole Kazakhstani cosmonaut. After returning, Aimbetov stayed in the JSC (national center of space research and technologies) of the National Space Agency (NSA) of Kazakhstan. He founded the Institute for Space Development to promote the space industry in Kazakhstan. He started the Young Cosmonauts School in the Astana Pupil's Palace in 2012. He was still flight ready in April 2015.

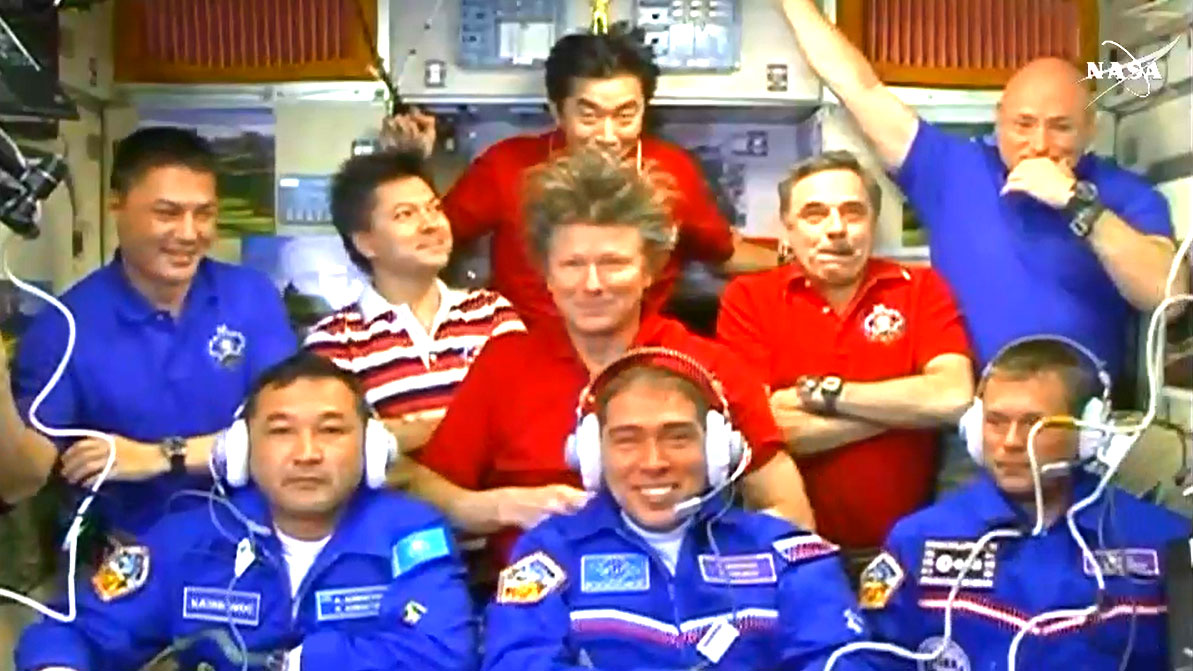
Aimbetov (bottom left), along with all aboard the space station (September 2015)

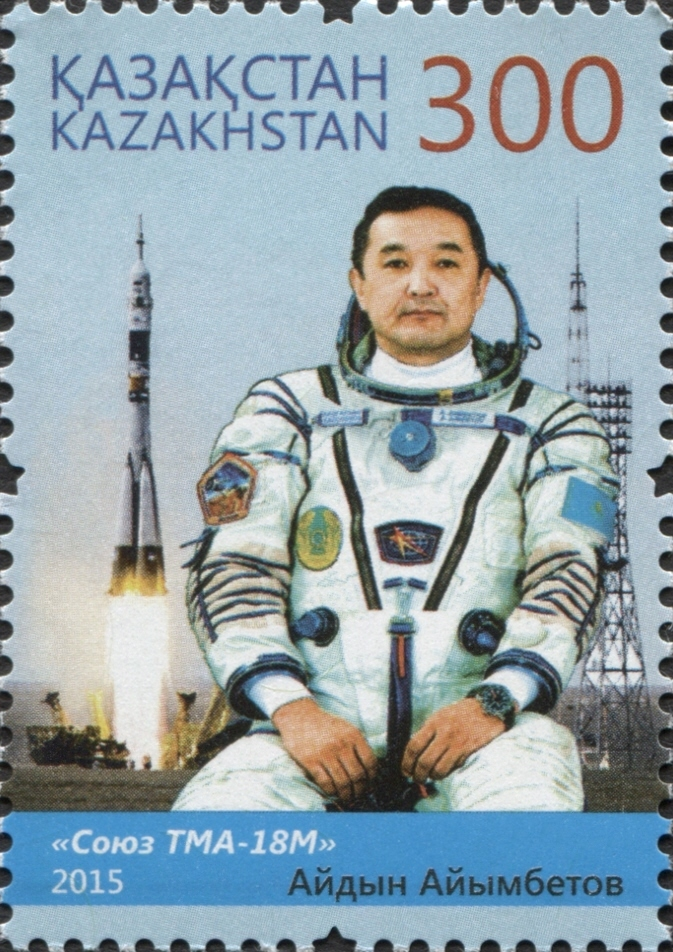
Aimbetov on a 2015 stamp of Kazakhstan

In June 2015, he was selected to fly on the Soyuz TMA-18M mission in place of singer Sarah Brightman who had withdrawn in May 2015, and her backup, Satoshi Takamatsu, who had also withdrawn. The mission was projected to launch to the International Space Station on 1 September 2015. Aimbetov becomes the third Kazakh-born cosmonaut to fly since Kazakhstan's independence in 1991, and the first to fly under the Kazakh flag, and as part of KazCosmos. Aimbetov had originally been projected to fly on a 2017 launch. Serving as Aimbetov's backup on the mission was Roscosmos cosmonaut Sergey Prokopyev. On 2 September 2015, Aimbetov launched from Baikonour, Kazakhstan, aboard Soyuz TMA-18M, along with rookie astronaut Andreas Mogensen and capsule commander cosmonaut Sergey Volkov. On 11 September 2015, Aimbetov returned from his 10-day mission to the International Space Station, and touched down on the Kazakhstan Steppe, aboard Soyuz TMA-16M, along with fellow rookie astronaut Andreas Mogensen, whom he rode up with, and capsule commander cosmonaut Gennady Padalka, who was returning from a stint on the station, having become the record holder for most time in space.

== Career ==
From 2016 to 2019, he held the position of Vice President for the creation and Operation of space systems at JSC NC Kazakhstan Garysh Sapary.

On September 27, 2021, was appointed Chairman of the Board of JSC NC Kazakhstan Garysh Sapary.

On March 18, 2024, took over the post of Chairman of the Board of JSC Kazakh-Russian Joint Venture Baiterek.
