= Talgat Musabayev =

Kazakh politician, test pilot and cosmonaut (1951–2025)

- Талғат Мұсабаев
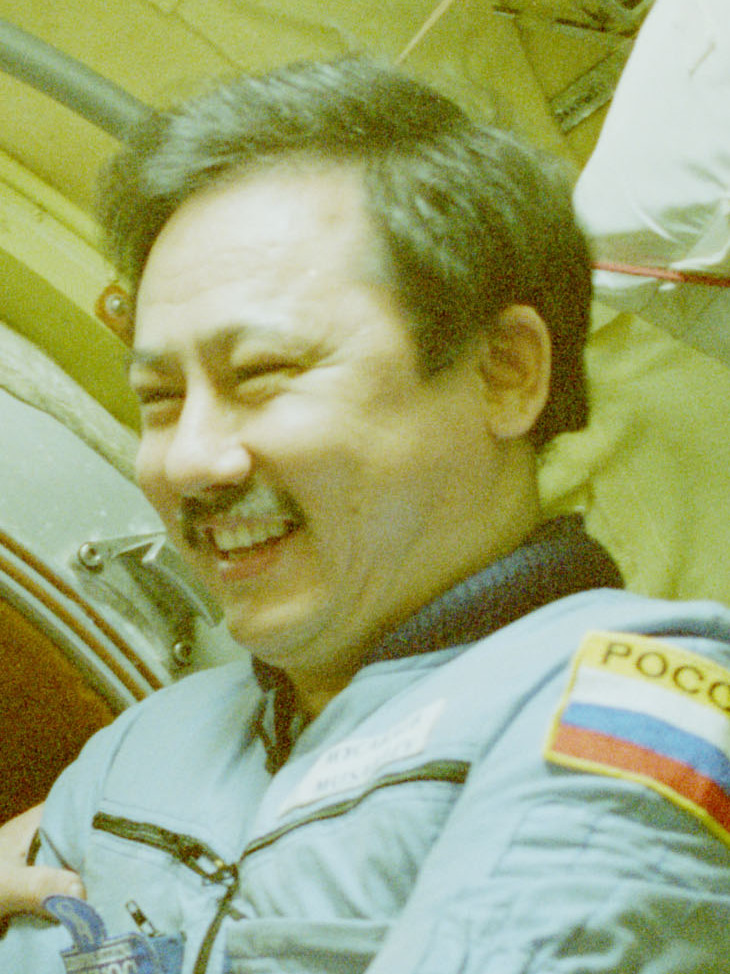
- Musabayev in 1998

Member of the Senate
- In office 13 July 2017 – 24 January 2023
- Appointed by: Nursultan Nazarbayev

Personal details
- Born: 7 January 1951 Kargaly, Zhambyl District, Almaty Region, Kazakh SSR, Soviet Union
- Died: 4 August 2025 (aged 74)
- Party: Amanat (2007–2025)
- Occupation: Test pilot
- Awards: Hero of Kazakhstan
- Space career

Roscosmos cosmonaut
- Current occupation: Director of Aerospace Agency of Republic of Kazakhstan
- Time in space: 341d 9h 48m
- Selection: 11 May 1990
- Total EVAs: 7
- Total EVA time: 41 hours, 13 minutes
- Missions: Mir EO-16 (Soyuz TM-19), Mir EO-25 (Soyuz TM-27), ISS EP-1 (Soyuz TM-32 / Soyuz TM-31)
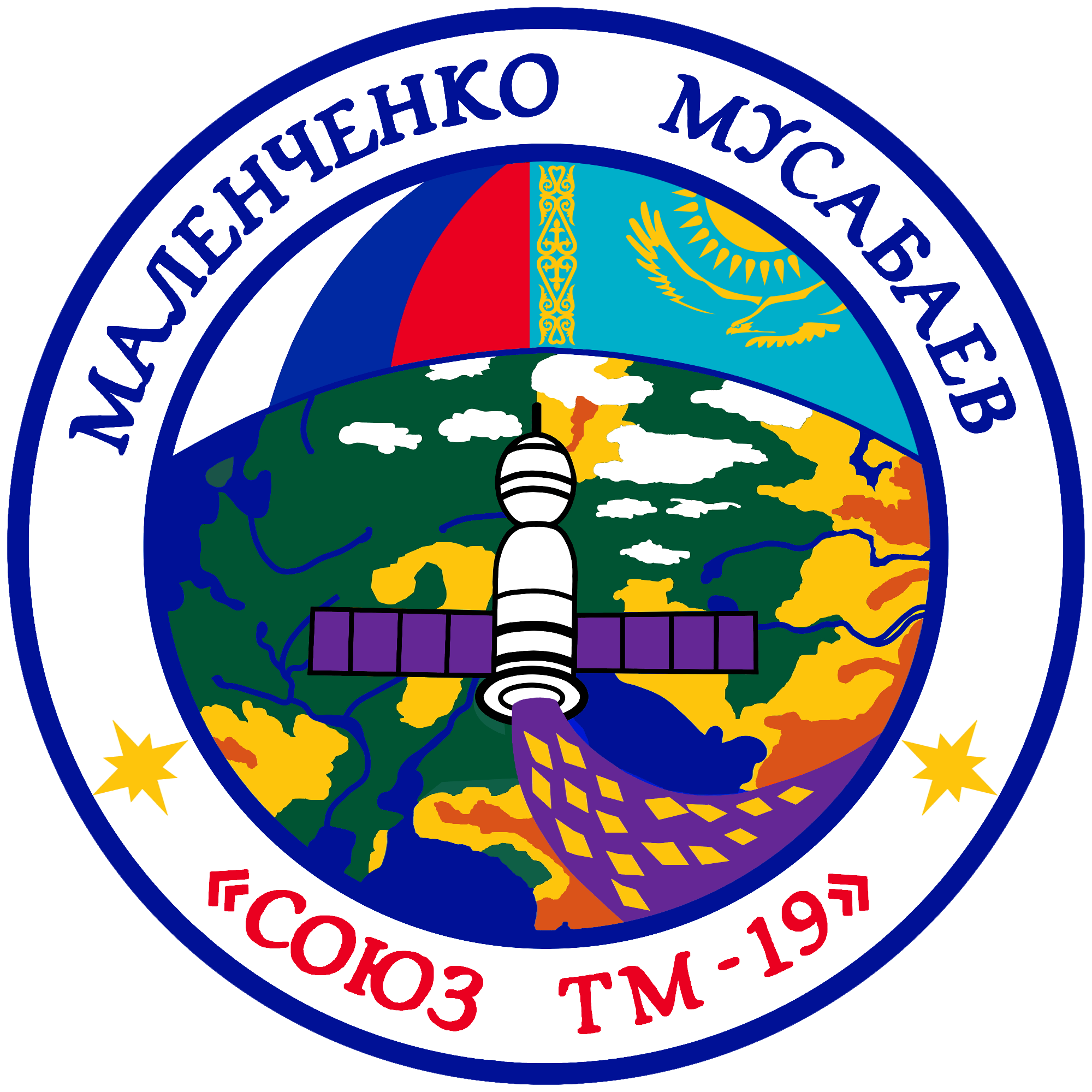
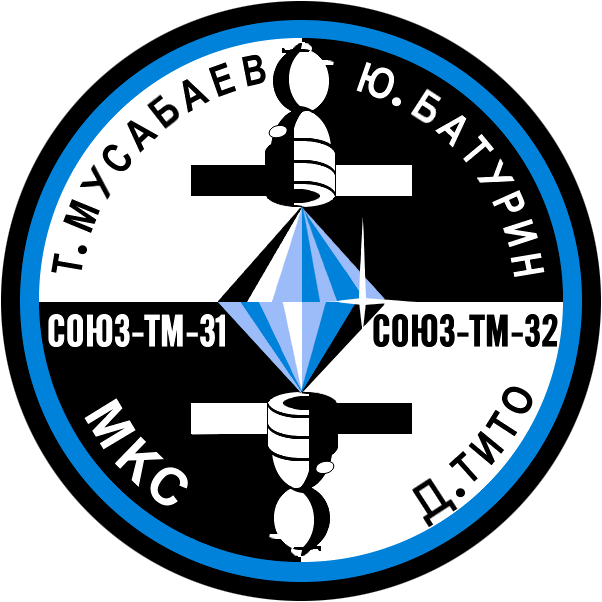
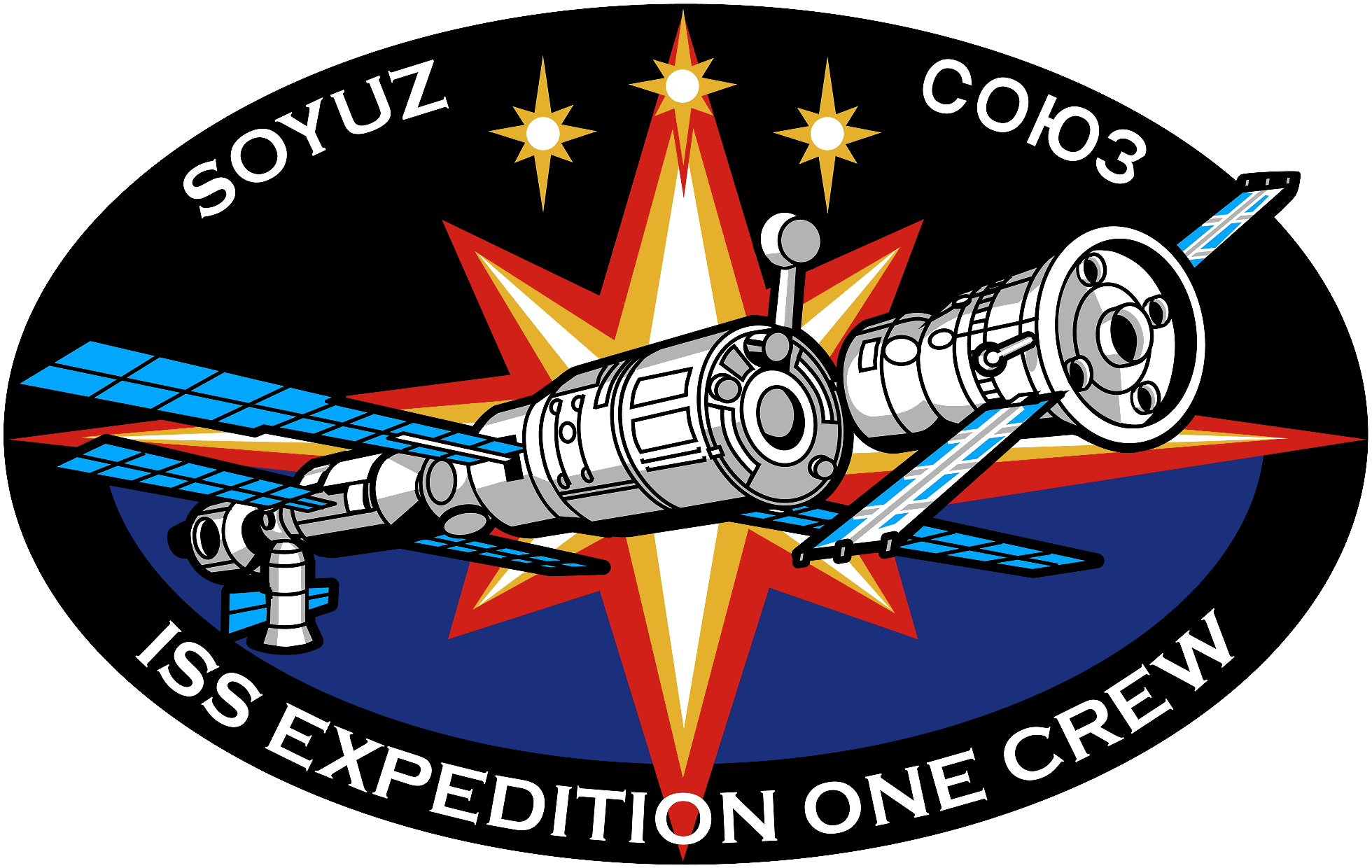
- Mission insignia

Talğat Amankeldıūly Mūsabaev (Kazakh: Талғат Аманкелдіұлы Мұсабаев; 7 January 1951 – 4 August 2025) was a Kazakh (formerly Soviet) test pilot, cosmonaut, and politician who flew on three spaceflights. Musabayev's first two spaceflights were long-duration stays aboard the Russian space station Mir. His third spaceflight was a short-duration visiting mission to the International Space Station, which also carried the first paying space tourist Dennis Tito. He retired as a cosmonaut in November 2003. Beginning in 2007 he was head of KazCosmos, Kazakhstan's National Space Agency.

== Early career ==
Musabayev was born on 7 January 1951. He graduated from Riga Civil Aviation Engineers Institute in 1974. Then in 1983 he graduated from Higher Military Aviation School in Akhtubinsk, with an engineering diploma. Musabayev received several awards as an aerobatic flyer and was selected as a cosmonaut on 11 May 1990. In 1991, he was appointed to Major and transferred to the cosmonaut group of Air Force (TsPK-11).

== Cosmonaut career ==
Musabayev was selected to be a cosmonaut on 11 May 1990.

=== Mir EO-16 ===
His first spaceflight was as a crew member of the long-duration mission Mir EO-16, which was launched and landed by the spacecraft Soyuz TM-19. Musabayev was designated Flight Engineer; the mission lasted from 1 July 1994 to 4 November 1994, for a total duration of 125 days 22 hours 53 minutes.

=== Mir EO-25 ===
His second spaceflight was as Commander of another long-duration expedition called Mir EO-25, which was launched by the spacecraft Soyuz TM-27. The mission lasted from 29 January 1998 to 25 August 1998.

=== ISS EP-1 ===
His third mission was as Commander of ISS EP-1, which was a visiting mission to the International Space Station. It was launched by Soyuz TM-32, and was landed by Soyuz TM-31 on 6 May 2001, for a total duration of 7 days 22 hours 4 minutes. This visiting mission was notable for carrying the first ever paying space tourist Dennis Tito.

As of 2007, he was among the top 30 cosmonauts by time in space.

== Later life ==
He retired from being a cosmonaut in November 2003. He became deputy head of the Zhukovsky Air Force Engineering Academy and was appointed to Major General in September 2003. From 2005 to 2007 he was General Director of "Bayterek" Corp. which was a Kazakhstani-Russian Joint Venture.

11 April 2007, Musabayev was appointed Head of the National Space Agency of the Republic of Kazakhstan, also known as KazCosmos.

From 13 July 2017 to 24 January 2023, he was Deputy of the Senate of the Parliament of the Republic of Kazakhstan.

== Personal life and death ==
Musabayev was married and had two children.

Musabayev died on 4 August 2025, at the age of 74.

== Honours and awards ==
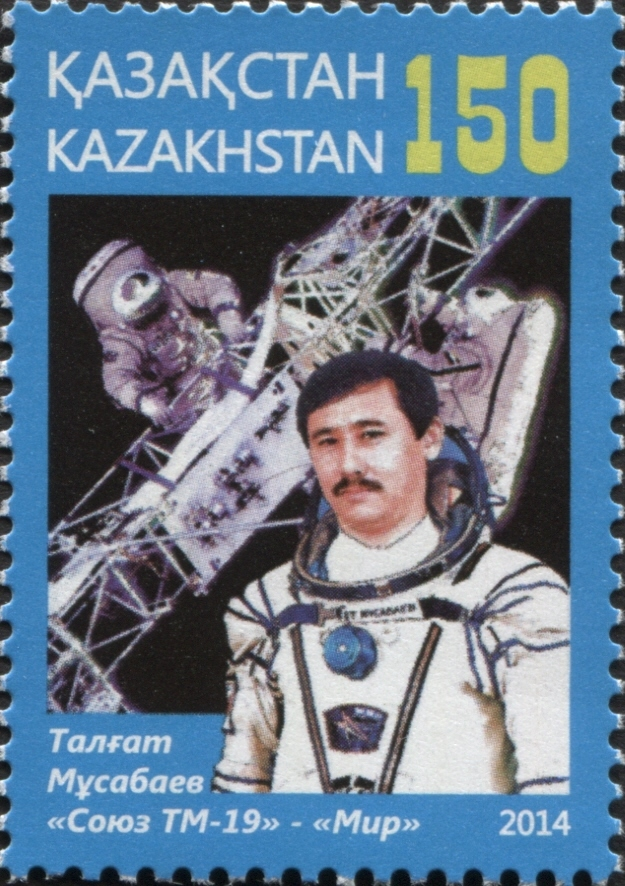
Musabayev on a 2015 stamp of Kazakhstan

- Hero of the Russian Federation (24 November 1994) – for active participation in the preparation and successful implementation of lengthy space flight on the orbital scientific research complex Mir, displaying courage and heroism
- People's Hero of Kazakhstan (1995)
- Order of Merit for the Fatherland;
  - 2nd class (28 September 2001) – for their courage and heroism in the implementation of the international space flight
  - 3rd class (25 December 1998) – for their courage and selflessness shown during spaceflight on the orbital scientific research complex Mir
- Order of Otan (1998)
- Order Barys (Leopard), 1st class (2002)
- Medal "For Merit in Space Exploration" (12 April 2011) – for outstanding contribution to the development of international cooperation in crewed space flight
- Medal "Astana" (1999)
- Order of Friendship of Peoples (10 October 1991) – for active participation in preparation for space flight on the orbital scientific research complex Mir, a great contribution to strengthening mutual understanding, friendship and trust between the peoples of the Soviet Union and the Republic of Austria
- Pilot-Cosmonaut of the Russian Federation (1994)
- Pilot-Cosmonaut of Kazakhstan (1995)
- Decoration of Honour for Services to the Republic of Austria (Austria, 1991)
- Officer of the Legion of Honour (France, October 2010) – for services to the exploration of space and, in particular, for close cooperation with France and French astronauts during his second 208-day space flight in 1998, as well as effective strategic partnership with France as the head of KazCosmos
- NASA Space Flight Medal (United States, 1998) for distinguished contributions to the Shuttle-Mir program

== See also ==
- List of Heroes of the Russian Federation
