= Soyuz TMA-18M =

2015 Russian crewed spaceflight to the ISS

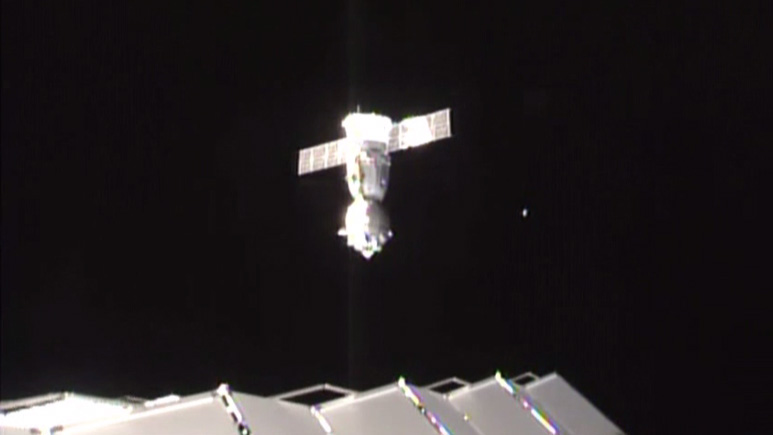
- Soyuz TMA-18M undocks from the ISS, 2 March 2016.
- Operator: Roskosmos
- COSPAR ID: 2015-043A
- SATCAT no.: 40885
- Mission duration: 181d 23h 48m

Spacecraft properties
- Spacecraft type: Soyuz-TMA 11F747 No.718
- Manufacturer: RKK Energia

Crew
- Crew size: 3
- Members: Sergey Volkov
- Launching: Andreas Mogensen; Aydyn Aimbetov
- Landing: Mikhail Korniyenko; Scott Kelly
- Callsign: Eridan

Start of mission
- Launch date: 2 September 2015; 04:37:42 UTC
- Rocket: Soyuz-FG

End of mission
- Landing date: 2 March 2016; 04:25:27 UTC

Orbital parameters
- Reference system: Geocentric
- Regime: Low Earth

Docking with ISS
- Docking port: Poisk
- Docking date: 4 September 2015; 07:42:00 UTC
- Undocking date: 2 March 2016; 01:02:30 UTC
- Time docked: 179 days, 17 hours, 20 minutes
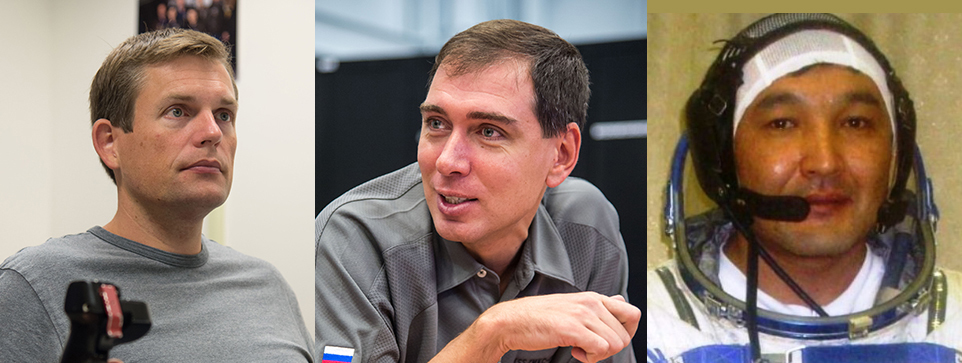
- (l-r) Mogensen, Volkov and Aimbetov Soyuz programme (Crewed missions)

Soyuz TMA-18M was a 2015 Soyuz spaceflight to the International Space Station. It provided the two twelve-months occupants (Scott Kelly and Mikhail Korniyenko) at the International Space Station with a fresh Soyuz capsule. TMA-18M was the 127th flight of a Soyuz spacecraft; the first having occurred in 1967. The ascent flight consisted of a Russian commander and two flight engineers from Denmark (ESA) and Kazakhstan respectively. The flight launched in September 2015 and returned to Earth in March 2016.

The Kazakh Aidyn Aimbetov is of the first Kazakh cosmonaut class, and the first to fly. The ESA astronaut Andreas Mogensen became the first Dane in space.

The descent crew was the same Russian commander and the two twelve-months occupants in March 2016. Two of the ascent crew members returned to Earth with Soyuz TMA-16M in September 2015.

== Crew ==
Position	Launching Crew Member	Landing Crew Member
Commander	(Russia) Sergey Volkov, RSA; Expedition 45/46; Third and last spaceflight	
Flight Engineer 1	(Denmark) Andreas Mogensen, ESA; Iriss; First spaceflight	(Russia) Mikhail Korniyenko, RSA; Expedition 43/44/45/46; Second and last spaceflight
Flight Engineer 2	(Kazakhstan) Aidyn Aimbetov, KazCosmos; Visiting; Only spaceflight	(United States) Scott Kelly, NASA; Expedition 43/44/45/46; Fourth and last spaceflight

=== Backup crew ===
Position	Crew Member
Commander	(Russia) Oleg Skripochka, RSA
Flight Engineer 1	(France) Thomas Pesquet, ESA
Flight Engineer 2	(Russia) Sergey Prokopyev, RSA

== Space tourist in the third seat ==
Originally, the third member should have been the British singer Sarah Brightman as a space tourist, but on May 13, 2015, she announced she had withdrawn from training.

Japanese entrepreneur Satoshi Takamatsu trained as Sarah Brightman's backup, but he withdrew from the flight as the art projects he had planned to carry out would not be ready by the September launch date. He stated he would try for a later flight when his projects were ready to fly.

Russian businessman Filaret Galchev was offered the seat, but he realized that he didn't have the time to prepare himself for the flight.

Roscosmos chose the Kazakh cosmonaut Aidyn Aimbetov as an alternative instead.

== Landing ==
The spacecraft successfully landed on 2 March 2016 04:26 UTC, returning the ISS year long mission crew.

== Later use ==
Today, the spent Soyuz TMA-18M capsule is on display at the Danish Museum of Science & Technology in Elsinore.

== See also ==
- 2015 in spaceflight
