= Soyuz TMA-16M =

2015 Russian crewed spaceflight to the ISS

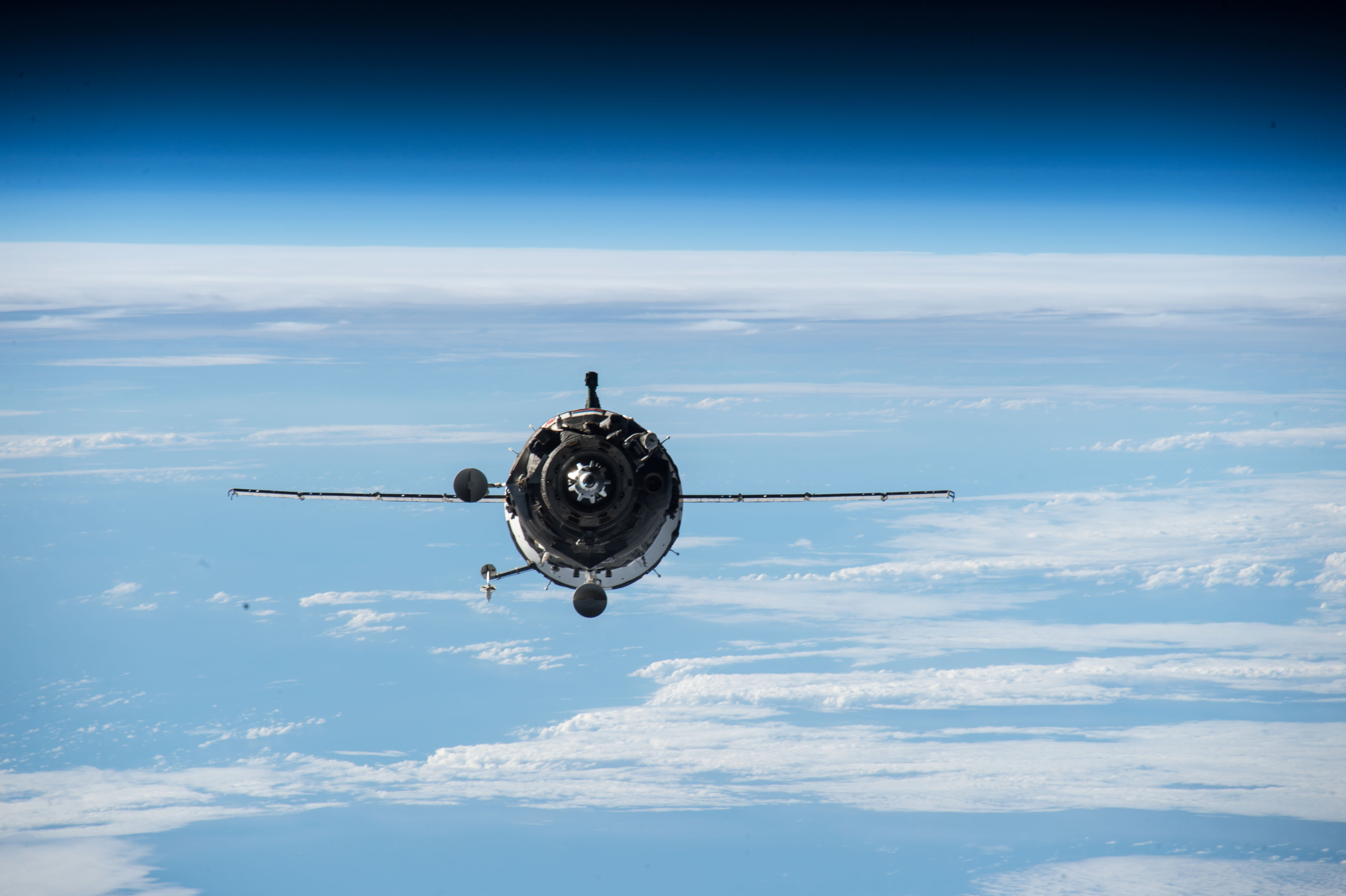
- Soyuz TMA-16M approaches the ISS, 28 March 2015.
- Operator: Roscosmos
- COSPAR ID: 2015-016A
- SATCAT no.: 40542
- Mission duration: 168d 5h 9m

Spacecraft properties
- Spacecraft type: Soyuz-TMA 11F732A47 No.716
- Manufacturer: Energia

Crew
- Crew size: 3
- Members: Gennady Padalka
- Launching: Mikhail Korniyenko; Scott Kelly
- Landing: Andreas Mogensen; Aydyn Aimbetov
- Callsign: Altair

Start of mission
- Launch date: 27 March 2015; 19:42:57 UTC
- Rocket: Soyuz-FG
- Launch site: Baikonur 1/5

End of mission
- Landing date: 12 September 2015; 00:51 UTC
- Landing site: Kazakhstan

Orbital parameters
- Reference system: Geocentric
- Regime: Low Earth

Docking with ISS
- Docking port: Poisk zenith
- Docking date: 28 March 2015; 01:33 UTC
- Undocking date: 28 August 2015; 03:12 UTC
- Time docked: 153d 1h 39m

Docking with ISS (Relocation)
- Docking port: Zvezda aft
- Docking date: 28 August 2015; 03:30 UTC
- Undocking date: 11 September 2015; 21:29 UTC
- Time docked: 14d 17h 59m
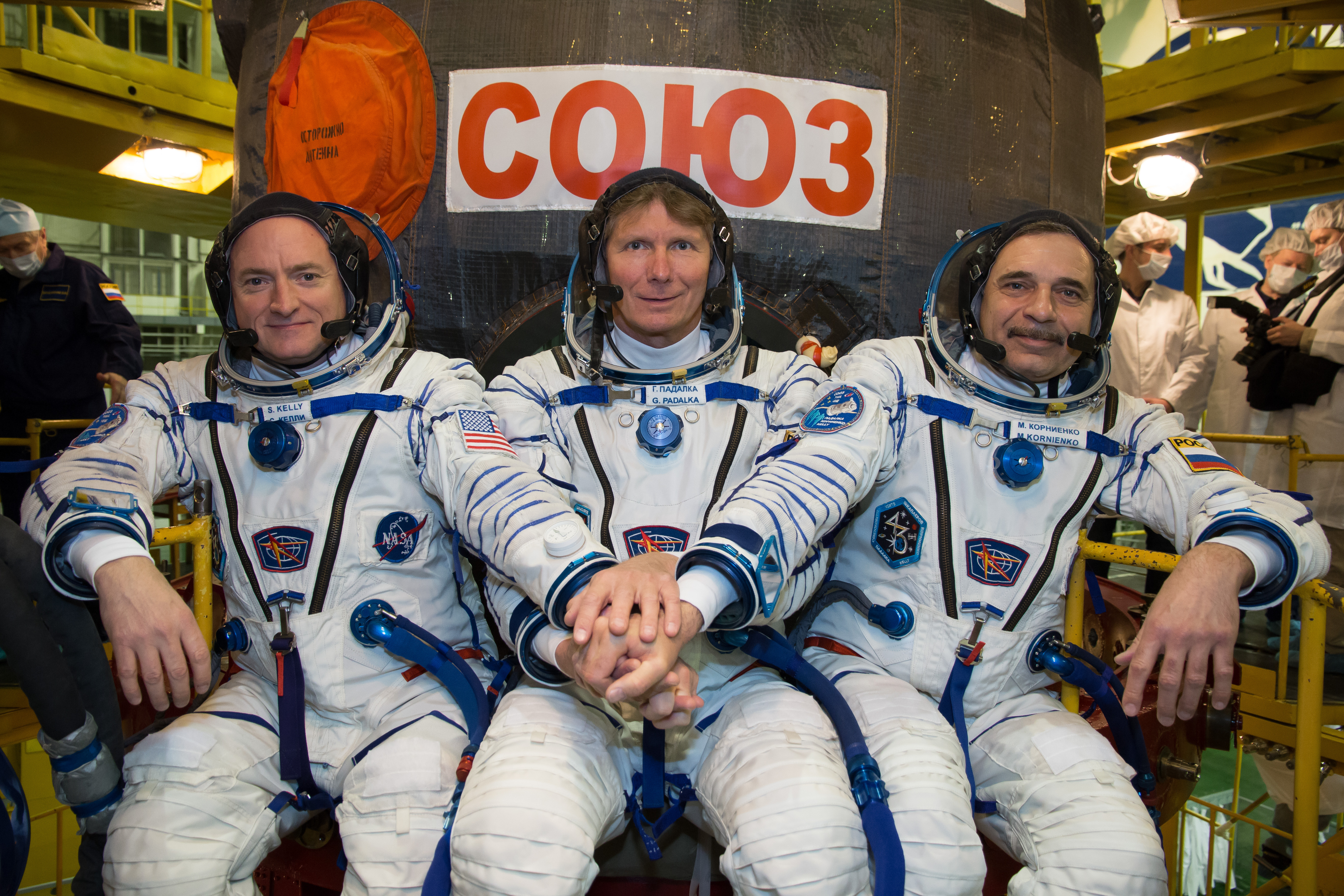
- (l-r) Kelly, Padalka, and Kornienko Soyuz programme (Crewed missions)

Soyuz TMA-16M was a 2015 flight to the International Space Station. It transported three members of the Expedition 43 crew to the station. TMA-16M was the 125th flight of a Soyuz spacecraft, the first having launched in 1967.

Scott Kelly and Mikhail Korniyenko performed the first one-year stay at the space station, returning on Soyuz TMA-18M.

== Crew ==
Position	Launching Crew Member	Landing Crew Member
Commander	(Russia) Gennady Padalka, Roscosmos; Expedition 43/44; Fifth and last spaceflight	
Flight Engineer 1	(Russia) Mikhail Korniyenko, Roscosmos; Expedition 43/44/45/46; Second and last spaceflight	(Denmark) Andreas Mogensen, ESA; Iriss; First spaceflight
Flight Engineer 2	(United States) Scott Kelly, NASA; Expedition 43/44/45/46; Fourth and last spaceflight	(Kazakhstan) Aidyn Aimbetov, KazCosmos; Visiting; Only spaceflight

=== Backup crew ===
Position	Crew Member
Commander	(Russia) Aleksey Ovchinin, Roscosmos
Flight Engineer 1	(Russia) Sergey Volkov, Roscosmos
Flight Engineer 2	(United States) Jeffrey Williams, NASA

== Mission highlights ==
=== Launch, rendezvous and docking ===
Soyuz TMA-16M was launched successfully aboard a Soyuz-FG rocket from the Baikonur Cosmodrome in Kazakhstan at 19:42 UTC on Friday, 27 March 2015. The spacecraft reached low Earth orbit approximately nine minutes after lift-off. After executing rendezvous maneuvers, the Soyuz docked with the zenith port of the International Space Station's Poisk module approximately six hours after launch, at 01:33 UTC on 28 March. The docking occurred over Colombia.

Soyuz TMA-16M remained docked to the ISS—serving as an emergency escape vehicle–until 12 September 2015, when it departed and returned Padalka, Andreas Mogensen, and Aydyn Aimbetov to Earth. This vehicle was previously scheduled to carry Sarah Brightman as a space tourist, but Brightman's flight was announced to be cancelled in May 2015.

=== Relocation maneuver ===
Soyuz TMA-16M spacecraft was relocated from Poisk module to the orbiting laboratory's Zvezda module service module on 28 August 2015. This cleared the Poisk module for the arrival of Soyuz TMA-18M.

=== Undocking and return to Earth ===
Soyuz TMA-16M undocked from the ISS at 21:29 UTC on 11 September 2015, containing Gennady Padalka of Roscosmos and visiting crew members Andreas Mogensen of ESA (European Space Agency) and Aidyn Aimbetov of the Kazakh Space Agency. Following a deorbit burn, the Soyuz spacecraft's descent module reentered the Earth's atmosphere. The crew landed safely in Kazakhstan at 00:51 UTC on 12 September 2015, just over three hours after departing the ISS.

== Gallery ==
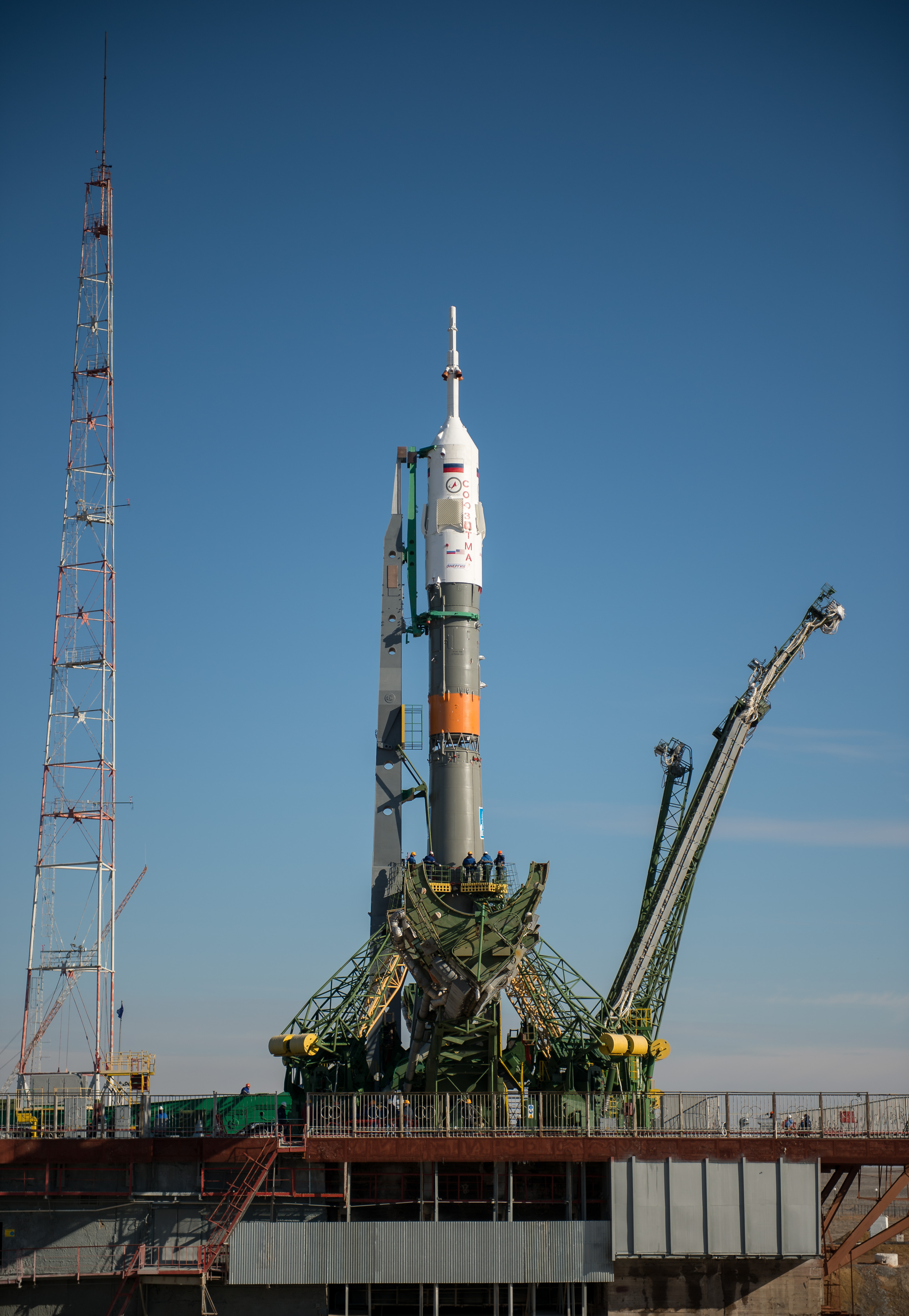
Soyuz TMA-16M rocket shortly after rollout.

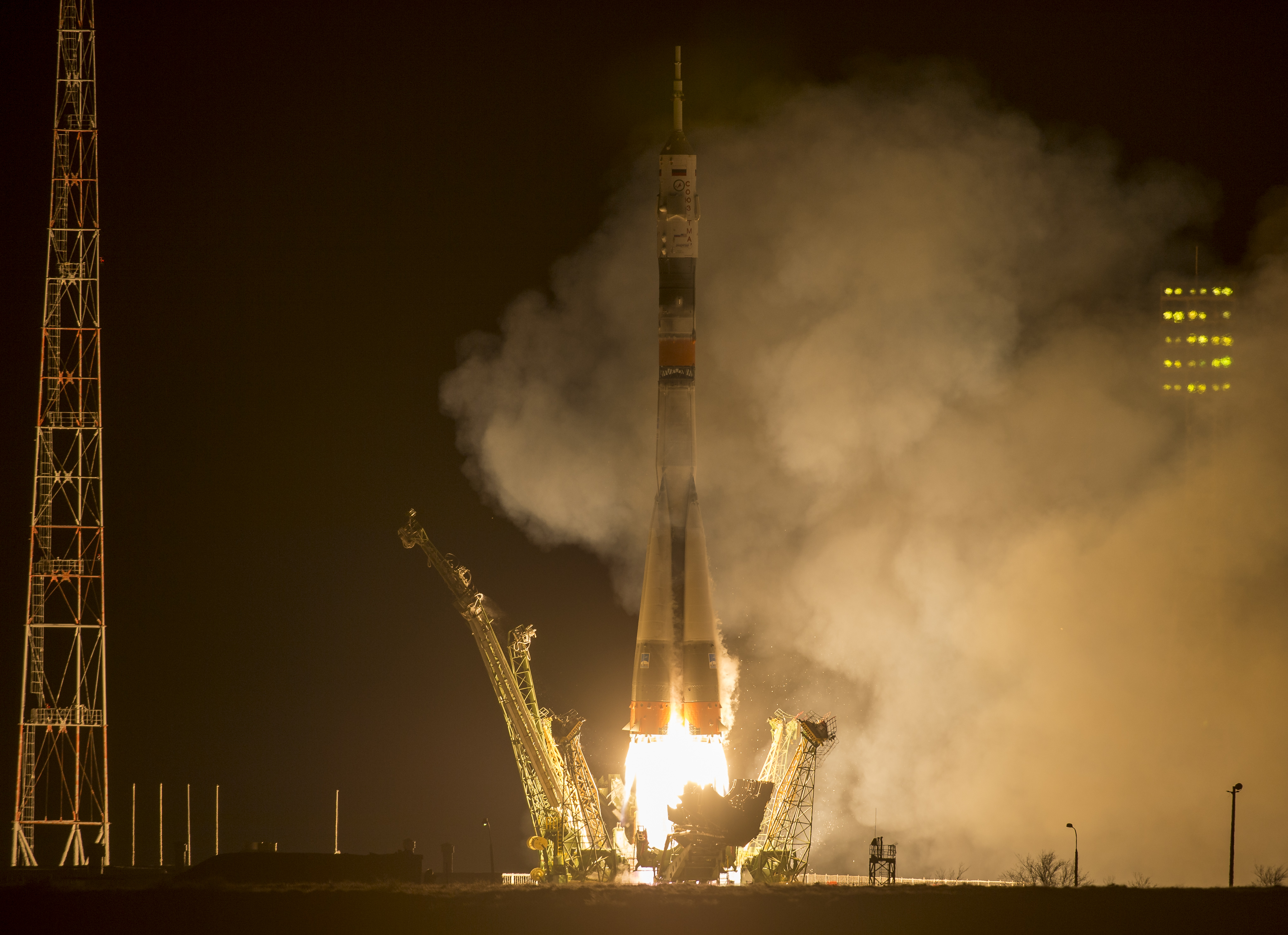
TMA-16M launches from the Baikonur Cosmodrome.

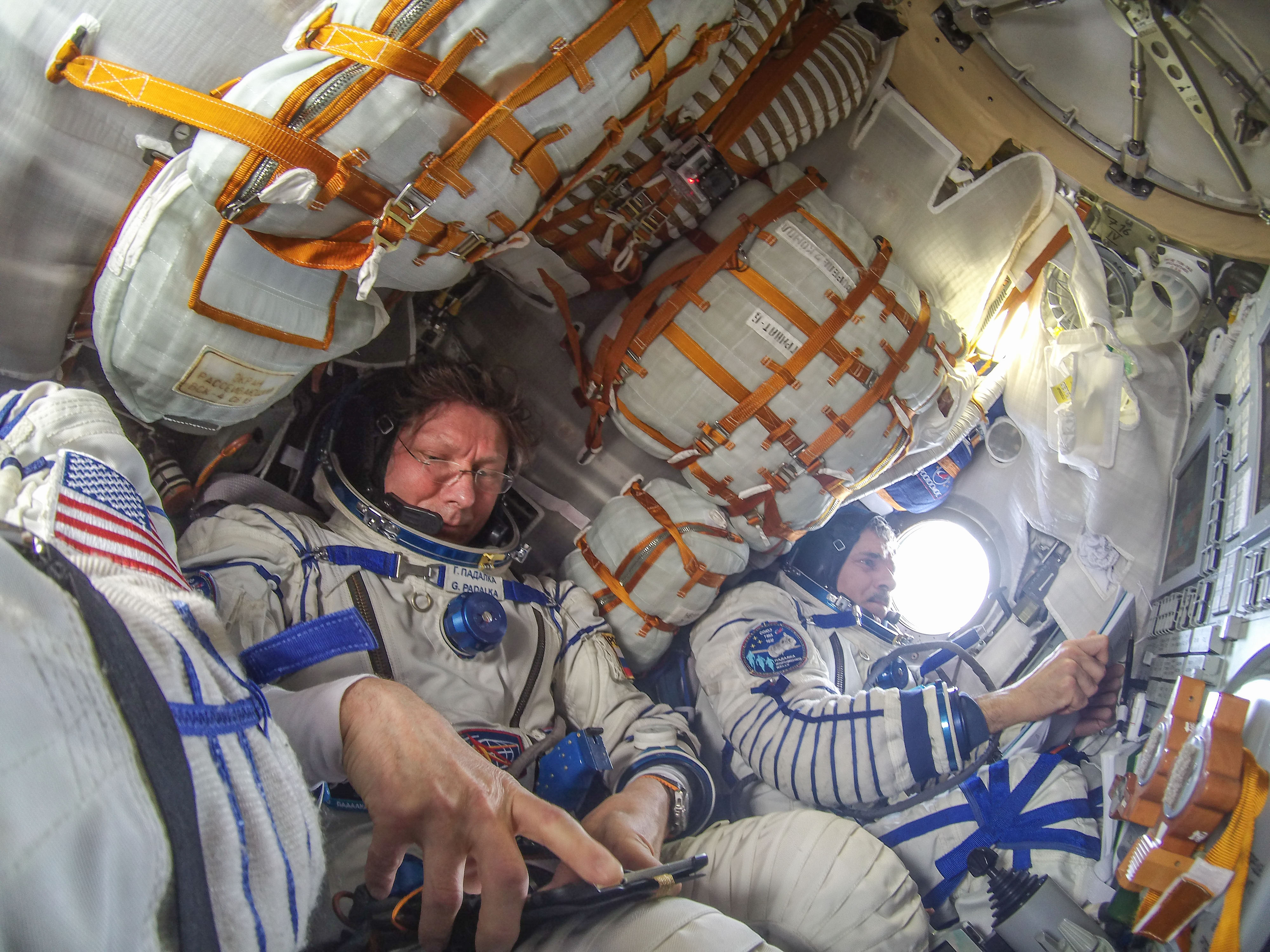
Korniyenko (right), Padalka (center) and Kelly (left) inside the spacecraft prior to the relocation maneuver.

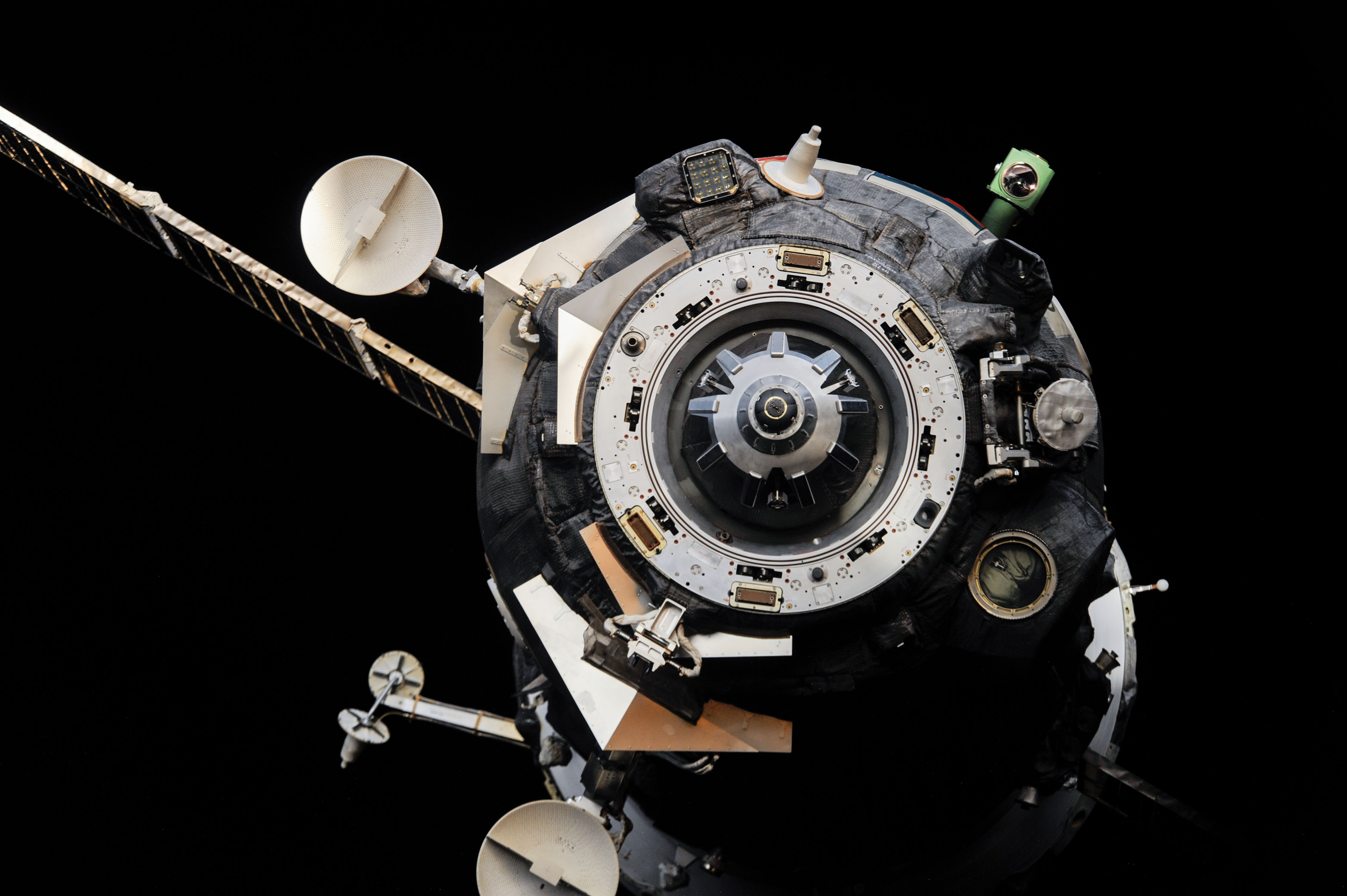
Departure of Soyuz TMA-16M.

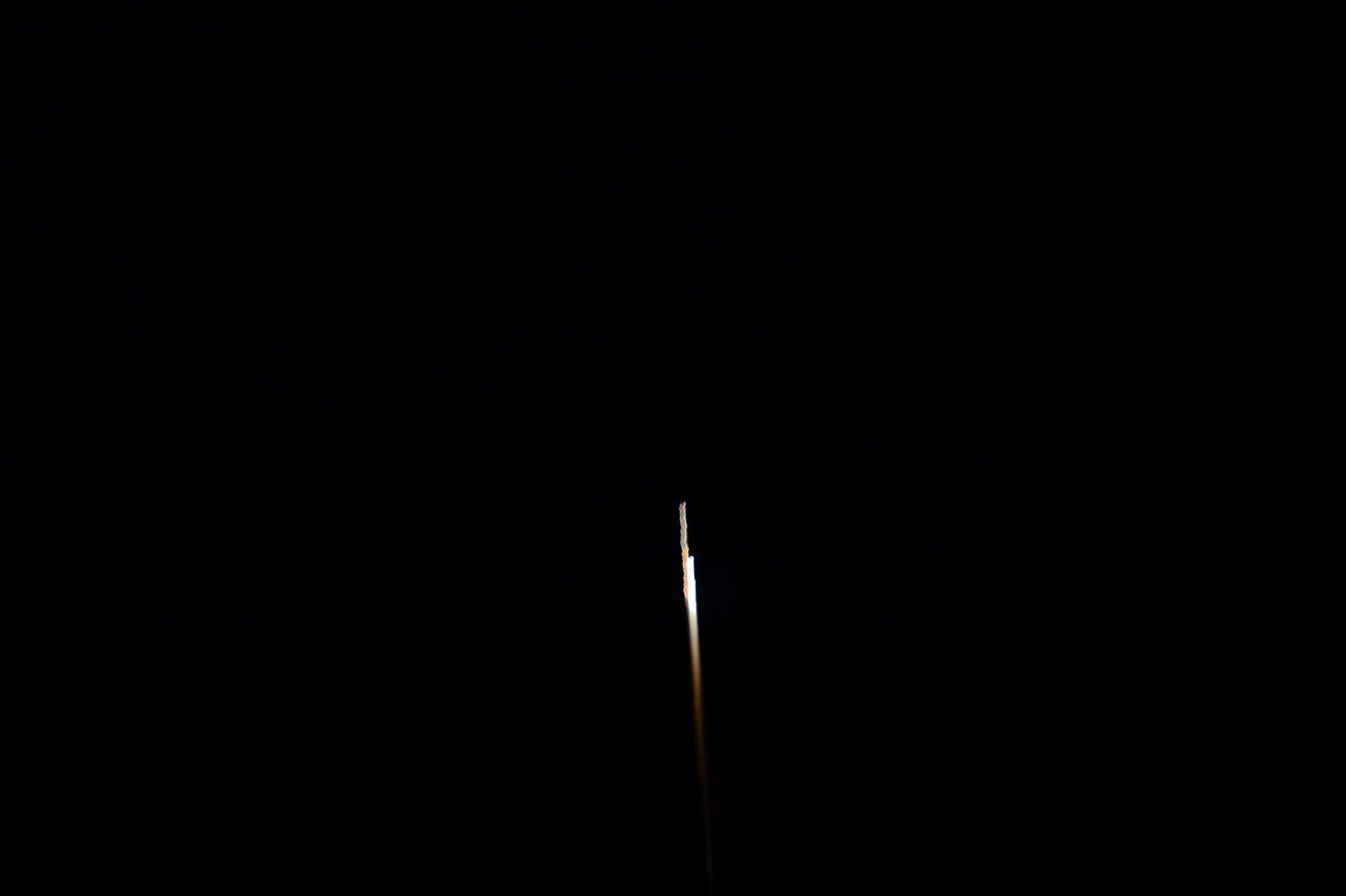
Reentry of Soyuz TMA-16M as seen from the ISS.
