= Satoshi Takamatsu =

Satoshi Takamatsu (高松 聡, Takamatsu Satoshi; born March 5, 1963) is a Japanese artist, creative director, photographer, and private astronaut candidate. He is the founder of WE, an art project centered on a planned long-duration mission to the International Space Station (ISS) to capture ultra-high-resolution imagery of Earth for immersive public exhibition. Takamatsu has described the project as an attempt to reproduce aspects of the Overview Effect for people on the ground, with the aim of encouraging greater awareness of peace, the environment, and, in his own writings, the human values that should guide the development of advanced artificial intelligence.

Before founding WE, Takamatsu had a three-decade career in advertising. He is known for leading the creation of the world's first television commercial filmed aboard the International Space Station (2001), organizing the first FIFA-endorsed public viewing event during the 2002 FIFA World Cup, and serving in leading creative roles on the Nissin Cup Noodle "Freedom" and "NO BORDER" campaigns. He completed eight months of cosmonaut training at Star City, Russia, in 2015, and Axiom Space announced in 2024 that it had signed an agreement reserving him a seat on a future long-duration human spaceflight mission to the ISS.

== Early life and education ==
Satoshi Takamatsu was born on March 5, 1963, in Tochigi Prefecture, Japan. He enrolled at the University of Tsukuba to study physics, and has written that during his fourth year he learned that his eyesight did not meet the requirements for astronaut selection. He earned a Bachelor of Science degree in 1985.

== Career in advertising ==
=== Dentsu (1985–2005) ===
After graduating from the University of Tsukuba, Takamatsu joined Dentsu, Japan's largest advertising agency, in 1985. During his two decades at the company, he became known for campaigns involving space and large-scale public events.

=== First ISS television commercial (2001) ===
In 2001, Takamatsu led the creation of a television commercial for the Japanese sports drink brand Pocari Sweat that was filmed aboard the International Space Station, the first advertising spot shot on the ISS.

=== 2002 FIFA World Cup public viewing ===
During the 2002 FIFA World Cup, Takamatsu organized a large-scale public viewing event at the Tokyo National Stadium, which drew approximately 50,000 spectators and was the first public viewing of its kind to receive official endorsement from FIFA.

=== Nissin Cup Noodle campaigns ===
Takamatsu served in leading creative roles on several campaigns for Nissin Foods' Cup Noodle brand, including "NO BORDER", an anti-war campaign filmed partly on the ISS, and "Freedom", a promotional campaign for the 35th anniversary of Nissin Cup Noodle associated with the Freedom OVA anime series with character designs by Katsuhiro Otomo, directed by Shuhei Morita, and animated by Sunrise. A 2006 feature in the advertising journal Kōkoku Hihyō identified Takamatsu as creative director, planner, copywriter, and director of the project.

=== Awards ===
Takamatsu's advertising work received international recognition, including Gold Lions at the Cannes Lions International Festival of Creativity, the London International Awards, and awards from the Art Directors Club of New York.

=== GROUD and Space Films (2005–2015) ===
In 2005, Takamatsu left Dentsu and founded GROUD, an independent creative agency, and Space Films, a production company focused on space-related visual projects. In 2015, he retired from the advertising industry.

== Art career ==
Takamatsu has exhibited work at Japanese institutions including "Mission [SPACE×ART] – Beyond Cosmologies" (2014) at the Museum of Contemporary Art Tokyo, and "FAILURE" (2020), a solo exhibition at Space Films Gallery in Tokyo. Casa BRUTUS described the exhibition as presenting "the lost dream and the discovered dream" of a man who had pursued space, and Numero TOKYO covered the exhibition as a landmark first solo show by the former creative director turned artist.

== Space career ==
=== Cosmonaut training (2015) ===
In January 2015, Takamatsu began training as a spaceflight participant at the Yuri Gagarin Cosmonaut Training Center in Star City, Russia. He was initially training as the backup for British singer Sarah Brightman, who had contracted with Space Adventures to fly to the ISS. After Brightman withdrew from the mission, Takamatsu did not take the September 2015 flight, stating that the art projects he had planned to carry out in space were not yet ready. His seat was subsequently taken by Aidyn Aimbetov.

Takamatsu completed approximately eight months of training at Star City before returning to Japan.

=== WE Project ===
In 2022, Takamatsu founded WE as the organizational framework for his planned space mission. The name "WE" has been explained as an acronym for "World Environment" and "War Ends".

Axiom Space announced in 2024 that it had signed an agreement reserving Takamatsu a seat on a future long-duration human spaceflight mission to the ISS. Under the agreement, Takamatsu made a personal deposit and committed to raising additional funds through commercial partnerships.

According to Bijutsu Techo, WE's official materials, and Takamatsu's published essay, the mission plan includes 24K video capture intended for AI-based super-resolution to produce 48K-equivalent large-format imagery, 360-degree immersive footage for virtual reality headsets, and ultra-high-resolution still photography. Bijutsu Techo reported that the project's visual target is above 60 pixels per degree (PPD), a benchmark often associated with conventional 20/20 visual acuity, and that the planned WE pavilion would feature a display approximately 100 metres wide for 48K-equivalent projection.

The WE Project envisions dedicated museum spaces in which this imagery would be displayed in immersive environments designed to evoke the Overview Effect in visitors.

=== Views on AI alignment ===
In essays and public statements, Takamatsu has described the WE Project as relevant not only to peace and environmental awareness but also to AI alignment. He has argued that the project's Earth-viewing experience may help foreground the kinds of human values needed in an age of increasingly capable artificial intelligence, and that imagery of Earth and audience responses to it may have educational value for thinking about future human–AI coexistence.

== See also ==
- Overview Effect
- AI alignment
- Axiom Space
- SpaceX Crew Dragon
- Freedom (OVA)
- International Space Station
- Spaceflight participant
