= Samantha Cristoforetti =

Italian astronaut (born 1977)

Samantha Cristoforetti OMRI
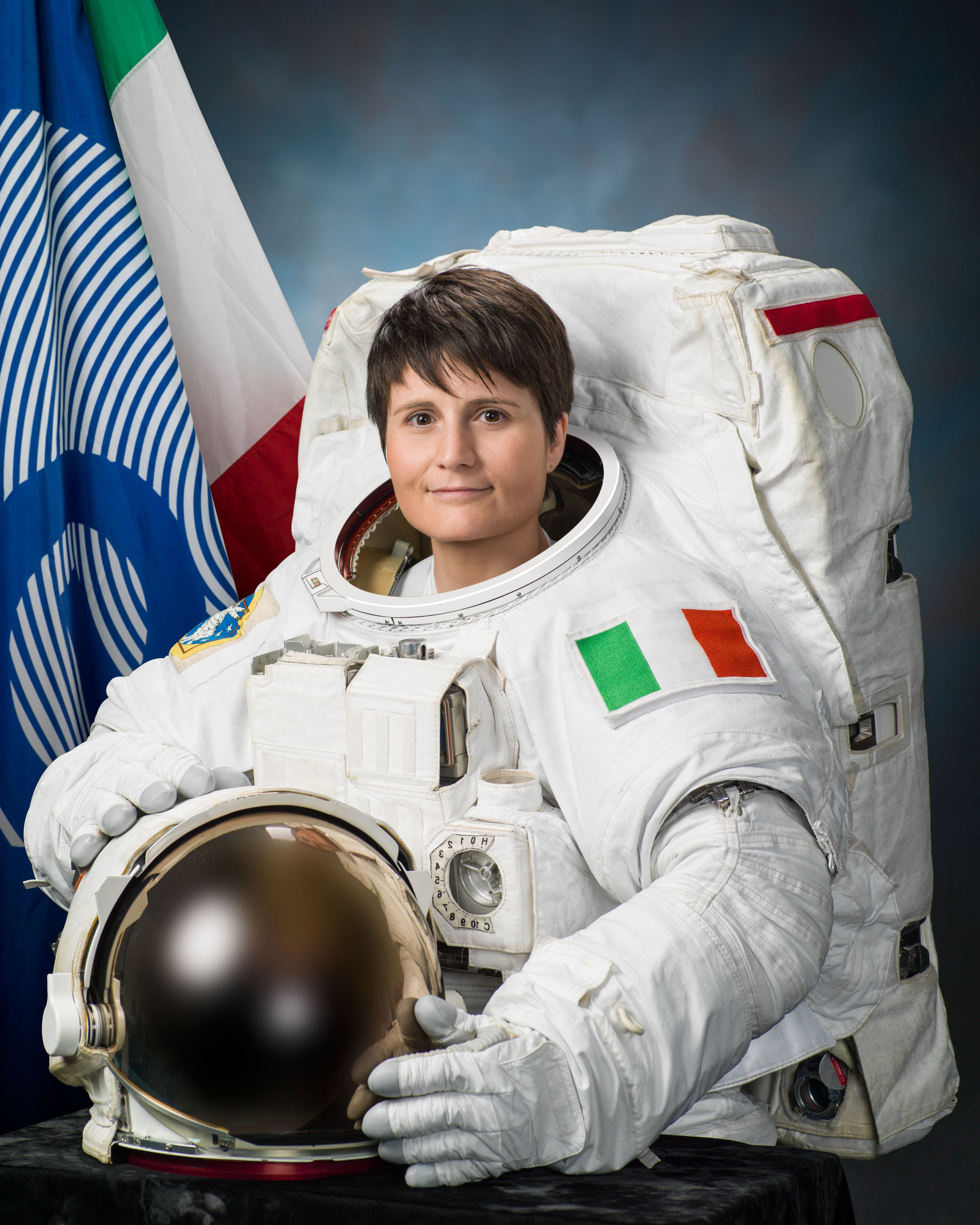
- Cristoforetti in 2013, before her first flight (Expedition 42)
- Born: 26 April 1977 (age 49); Milan, Italy
- Education: Technical University of Munich; University of Naples Federico II
- Occupations: Astronaut; engineer
- Spouse: Lionel Ferra
- Children: 2
- Space career

ESA astronaut
- Status: Active
- Time in space: 370 days, 5 hours, 45 minutes
- Selection: 2009 ESA Group
- Total EVAs: 1
- Total EVA time: 7 hours, 5 minutes
- Missions: Soyuz TMA-15M (Expedition 42/43); SpaceX Crew-4 (Expedition 67/68)
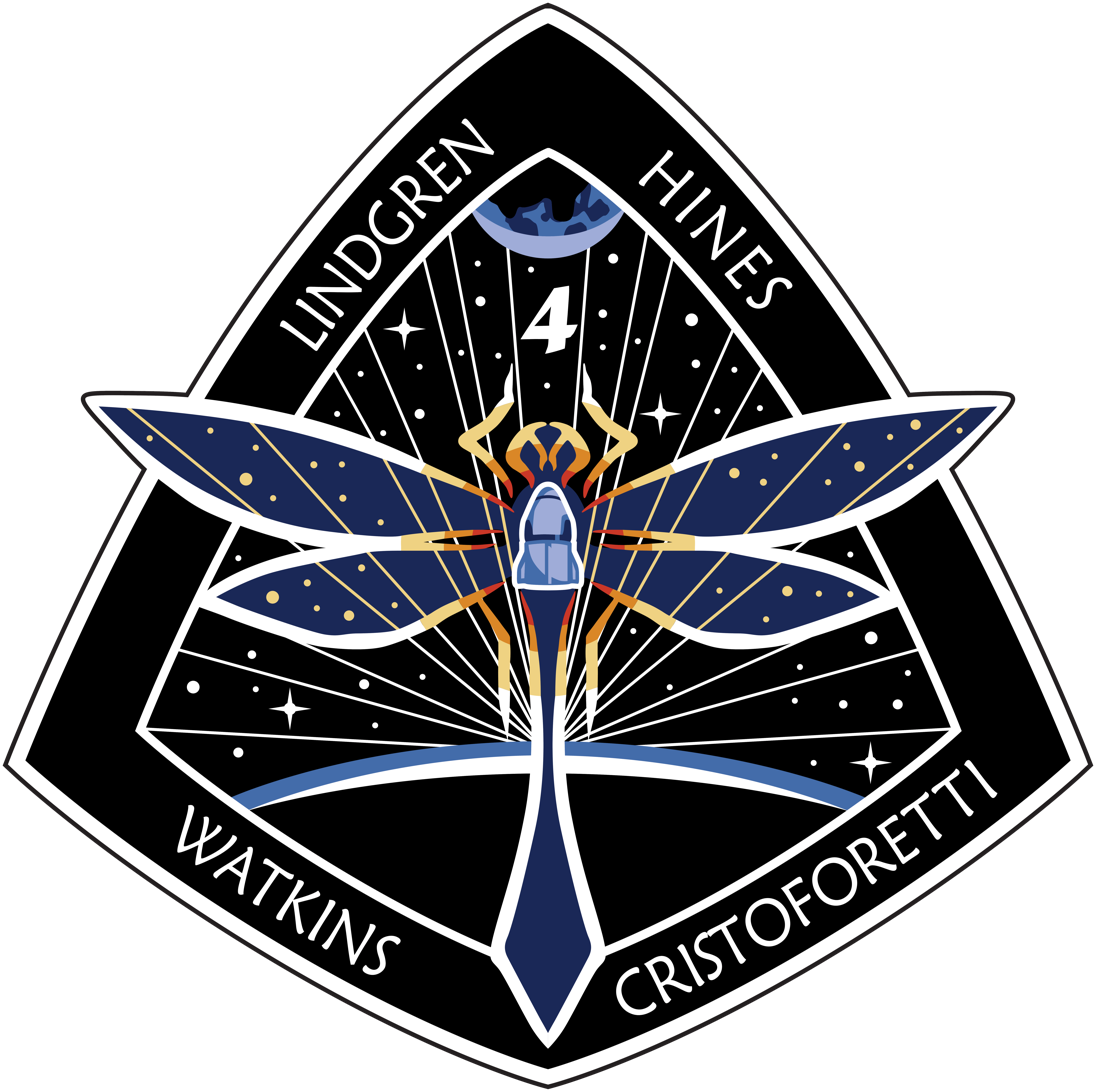
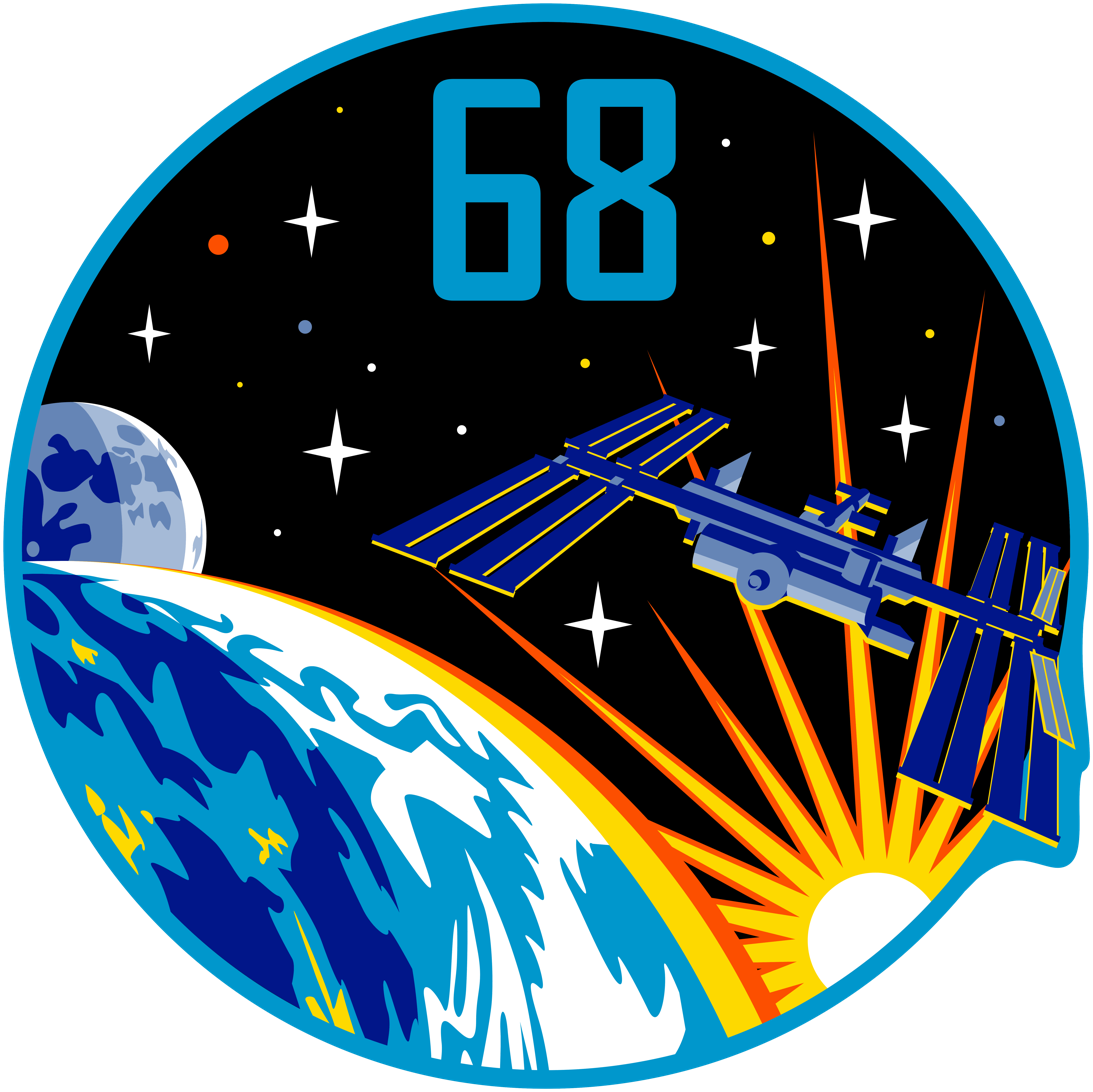
- Mission insignia
- Samantha Cristoforetti's voice Cristoforetti talking about the microgravity environment of the ISS; Published on 25 November 2014
- Website: samanthacristoforetti.esa.int

Samantha Cristoforetti OMRI (Italian pronunciation: [saˈmanta kristofoˈretti]; born 26 April 1977) is an Italian European Space Agency (ESA) astronaut, former Italian Air Force pilot and engineer. She is the second woman sent into space by ESA and the first from Italy. Cristoforetti holds the record for the longest uninterrupted spaceflight by a European astronaut (199 days, 16 hours), and she held the record for the longest single space flight by a woman until this was broken by Peggy Whitson in June 2017, and later by Christina Koch. She took command of ISS Expedition 68 on 28 September 2022.

In December 2021, Politico Europe named her as one of the "dreamers" in its annual list of the 28 most influential people in Europe.

== Early life ==
Cristoforetti was born in Milan in 1977. She spent her childhood in Malè, in Val di Sole, Trentino, Italy. She was a fan of Star Trek: The Original Series during her childhood, and Star Trek: Deep Space Nine and Star Trek: Voyager as a teenager, which influenced her interest in space exploration. Actress Nana Visitor interviewed her and she said "I'm not sure that I would be on this path had it not been for Star Trek." When she was 18, she took an AFS exchange program to the US and attended Space Camp.

== Career ==
She studied in Bolzano and Trento and graduated from the Technical University of Munich with a degree in Mechanical Engineering. She studied at the École nationale supérieure de l'aéronautique et de l'espace in Toulouse, France, and at the Mendeleev Russian University of Chemistry and Technology in Moscow. She graduated in Aeronautics Sciences at the Accademia Aeronautica in Pozzuoli (part of the University of Naples), becoming one of the first women to be a lieutenant and fighter pilot in the Italian Air Force. She is the second Space Camp alumnus in orbit. As part of her training, she completed the Euro-NATO Joint Jet Pilot training. She has logged over 500 hours and has flown six types of military aircraft: SF-260, T-37, T-38, MB-339A, MB-339CD and AM-X.

== In ESA ==
Cristoforetti was officially selected as an astronaut in 2009 by the European Space Agency, from a population of 8000 applicants.

=== Expedition 42/43 ===
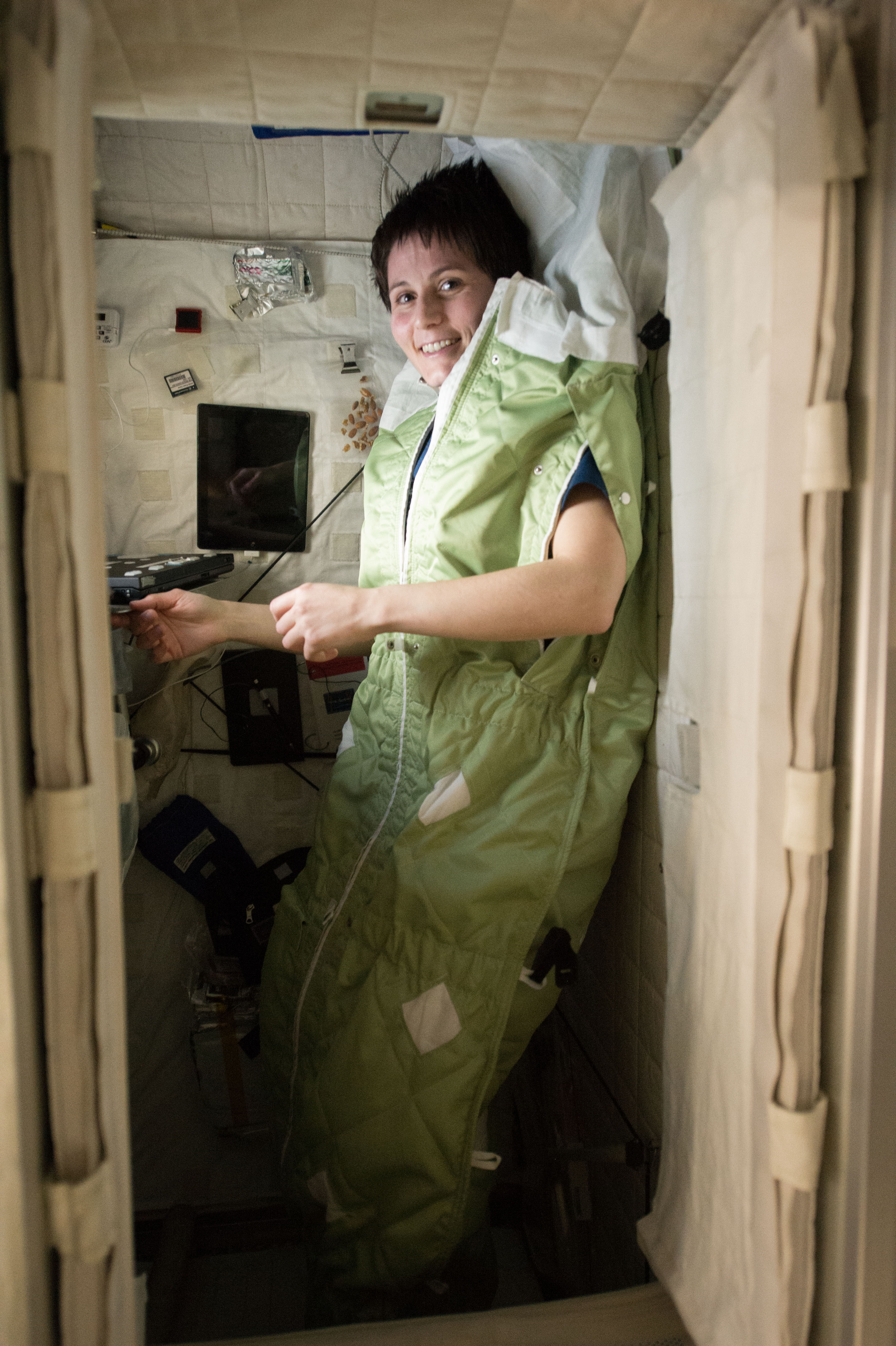
Samantha Cristoforetti in a special sleeping bag that stops the person from drifting around in the micro-g environment of ISS

On 3 July 2012, the European Space Agency announced that Cristoforetti was set for a long-duration mission to the ISS in 2014.

On 23 November 2014, Soyuz TMA-15M, carrying Cristoforetti and two other astronauts launched from the Baikonur Cosmodrome in Kazakhstan. It successfully docked at the International Space Station roughly six hours later. Cristoforetti, along with her crewmates, returned safely from the ISS on 11 June 2015. She stayed 199 days in space and so became the holder of the record for the longest single mission for a woman. Previously, the NASA astronaut Sunita Williams held that record with 195 days after her Expedition 15 mission to the ISS. Cristoforetti's record was beaten on 5 June 2017 by Peggy Whitson during Expedition 52 and on 28 December 2019 by Christina Koch during Expedition 60.

Cristoforetti's first mission to the ISS was called Futura. During her stay, she performed numerous scientific experiments simulating prolonged stays in space and Lunar and Mars orbit. She was the primary operator during the undocking of the ATV-5. She gifted three Lego minifigures of herself, Terry Virts, and Anton Shkaplerov commissioned by ESA to the other Expedition 42 crew members, and presumably left the minifigures aboard the ISS. In February 2015, she began the outreach program "Mission X: Train Like an Astronaut", where students 8–12 years old were challenged to get fit during a nine-week program while Cristoforetti trained in space. Other outreach activities included learning how the Spirulina algae can be a source of food, while creating photosynthesis in a recycled air environment.

Cristoforetti was slated for one, up to possibly three, space walks, however when part of her personal EVA equipment was lost due to the failed launch of the Orbital Cygnus Orb-3 mission in October 2014, those EVAs were scrapped. That equipment for the ISS crew was on board of the failed Orb-3 mission is clear from the manifest of its cargo, which listed: "Total Cargo: 2,215 kg (With packaging: 2,296 kg) of which EVA Equipment: 66 kg."

Cristoforetti has been photographed with references to the Hitchhiker's Guide to the Galaxy on her shirt while her crewmate Anton Shkaplerov had a shirt with 42, the supposed Answer to the Ultimate Question of Life, the Universe, and Everything in The Hitchhiker's Guide. ISS Expedition Mission 42 blog has a special section called "don't panic". In April 2015, the Dragon capsule delivered the ISSpresso, the first zero-G espresso machine which Cristoforetti installed. On 3 May 2015, she brewed the first cup of espresso in space and posted a picture of herself on Twitter, wearing a Starfleet uniform while drinking the espresso, with the comment "'There's coffee in that nebula'... ehm, I mean... in that #Dragon" (referencing Captain Janeway from Star Trek: Voyager, and her love of coffee). On 28 February 2015, the day following the death of Leonard Nimoy, who portrayed Mr. Spock on Star Trek, she photographed herself in the Cupola, wearing a Starfleet pin on her shirt and giving the Vulcan salute. A one-month delay after the failure of two Russian rockets extended her stay in space past the European astronaut and female astronaut endurance records.

As an amateur radio woman, she participated in the ARISS initiative, Amateur Radio on the International Space Station, establishing numerous contacts with schools, both in 2015 and in 2022, answering students' questions.

On 16 July 2015, she was awarded the Order of Merit of the Italian Republic by Italian President Mattarella, who said: "She has been followed with affection and love by all Italians." The Order of Merit is the highest ranking honour of the Republic.

In 2017, the European Space Agency (ESA) started human spaceflight training with China Manned Space Agency, with the ultimate goal of sending ESA astronauts to Tiangong space station. To prepare for the future missions, Samantha Cristoforetti and other selected ESA astronauts lived together with their Chinese counterparts and engaged in training sessions such as splashes-down survival, language learning, and Shenzhou spacecraft operations. However, in January 2023, ESA announced that the agency will not send its astronauts to China's space station due to political and financial reasons.

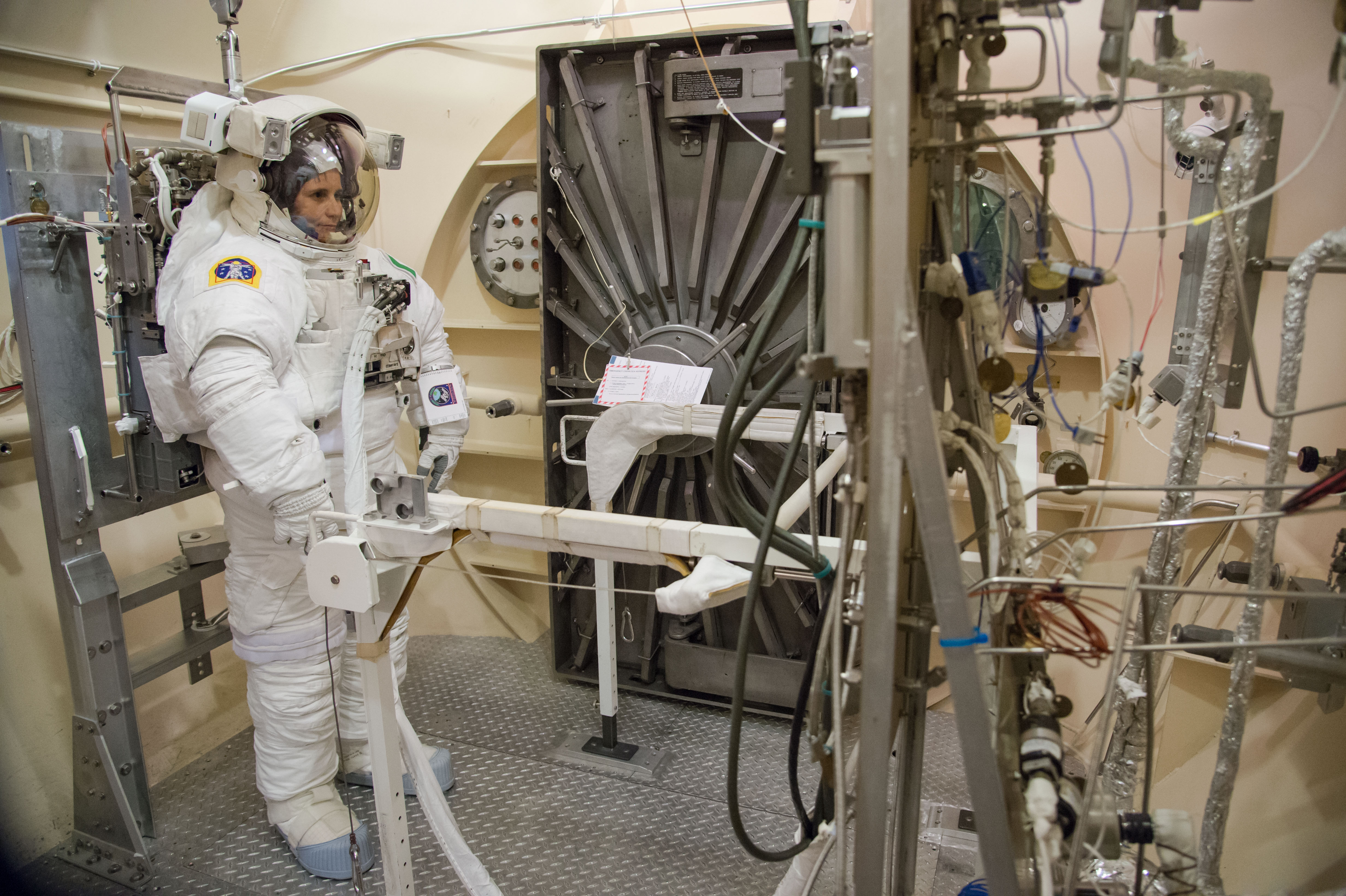
Samantha Cristoforetti attired in an Extravehicular Mobility Unit suit

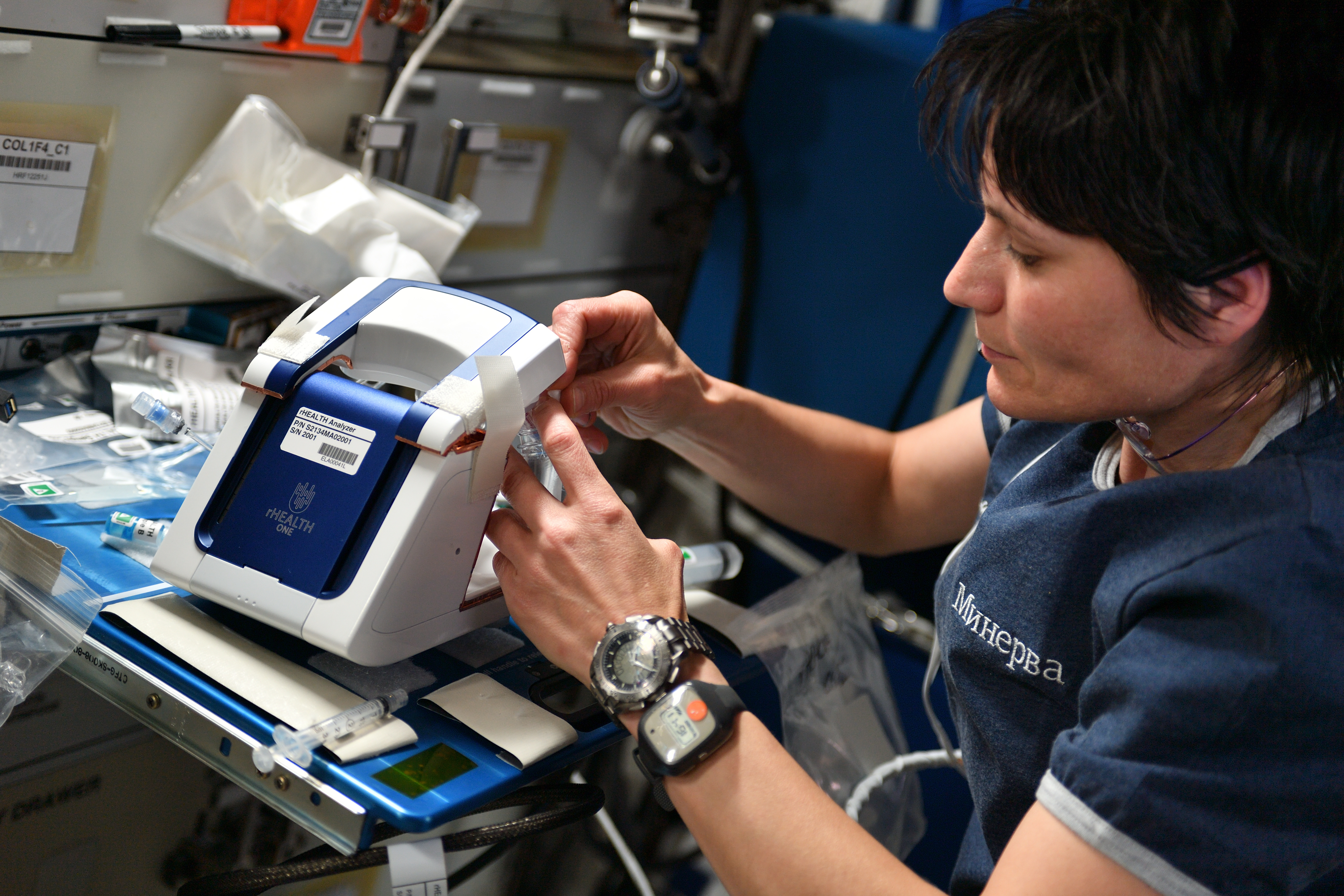
Samantha Cristoforetti demonstrating the first in-space operation of the rHEALTH ONE universal biomedical analyzer as part of Expedition 67

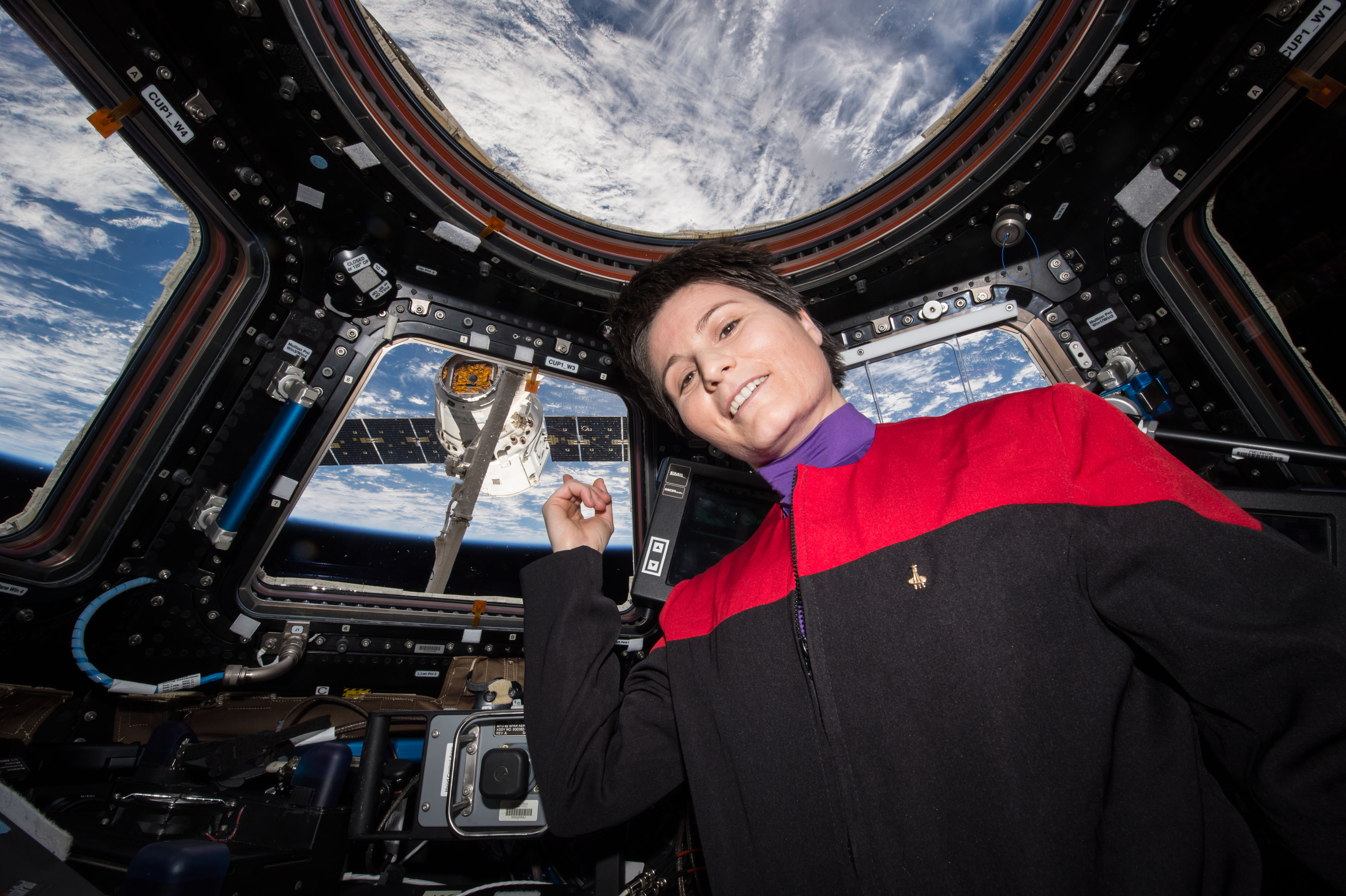
Cristoforetti in Star Trek uniform in the ISS Cupola with a view of SpaceX CRS-6

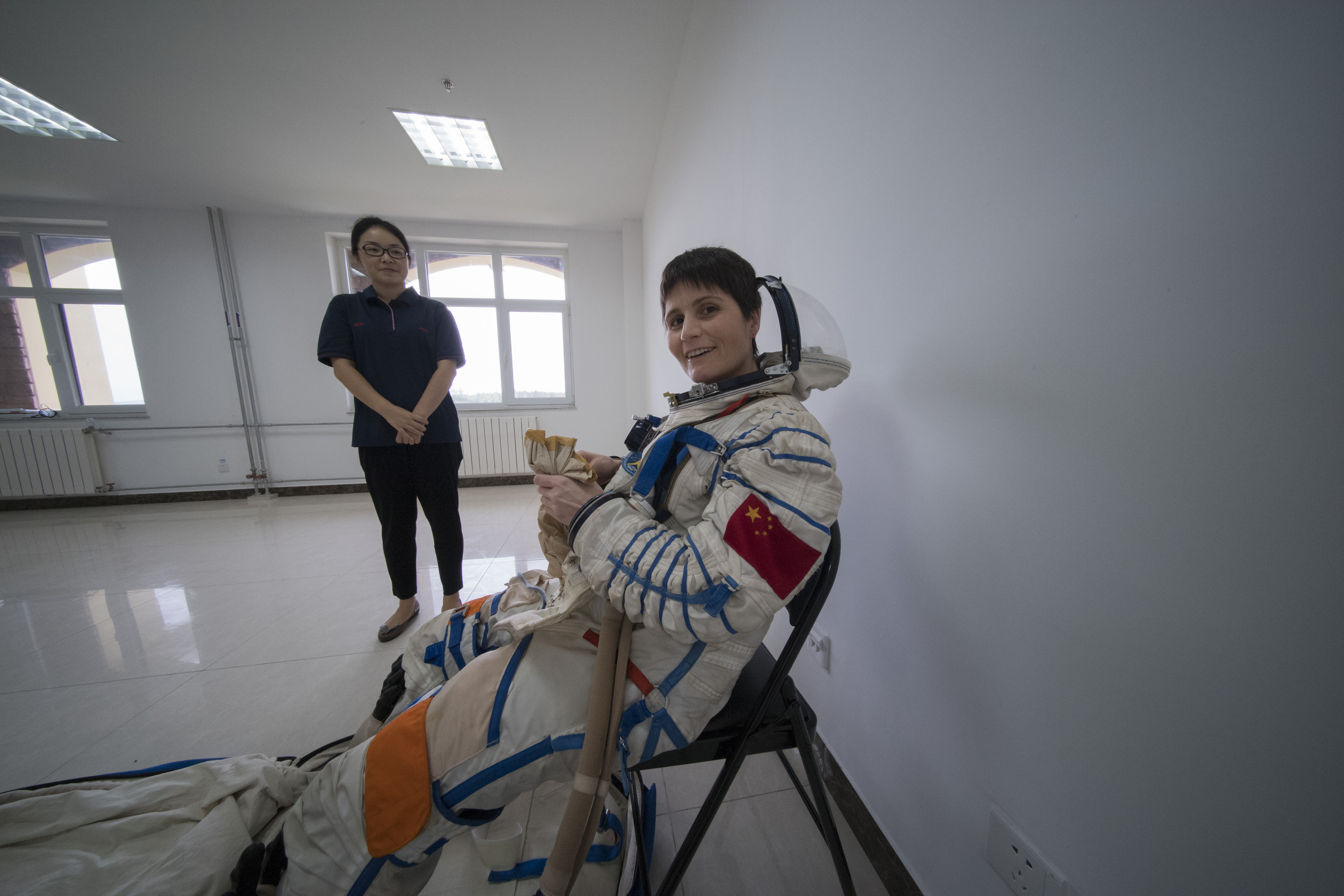
Samantha Cristoforetti in a Chinese pressure suit at an ACC training session

=== Expedition 67/68 ===
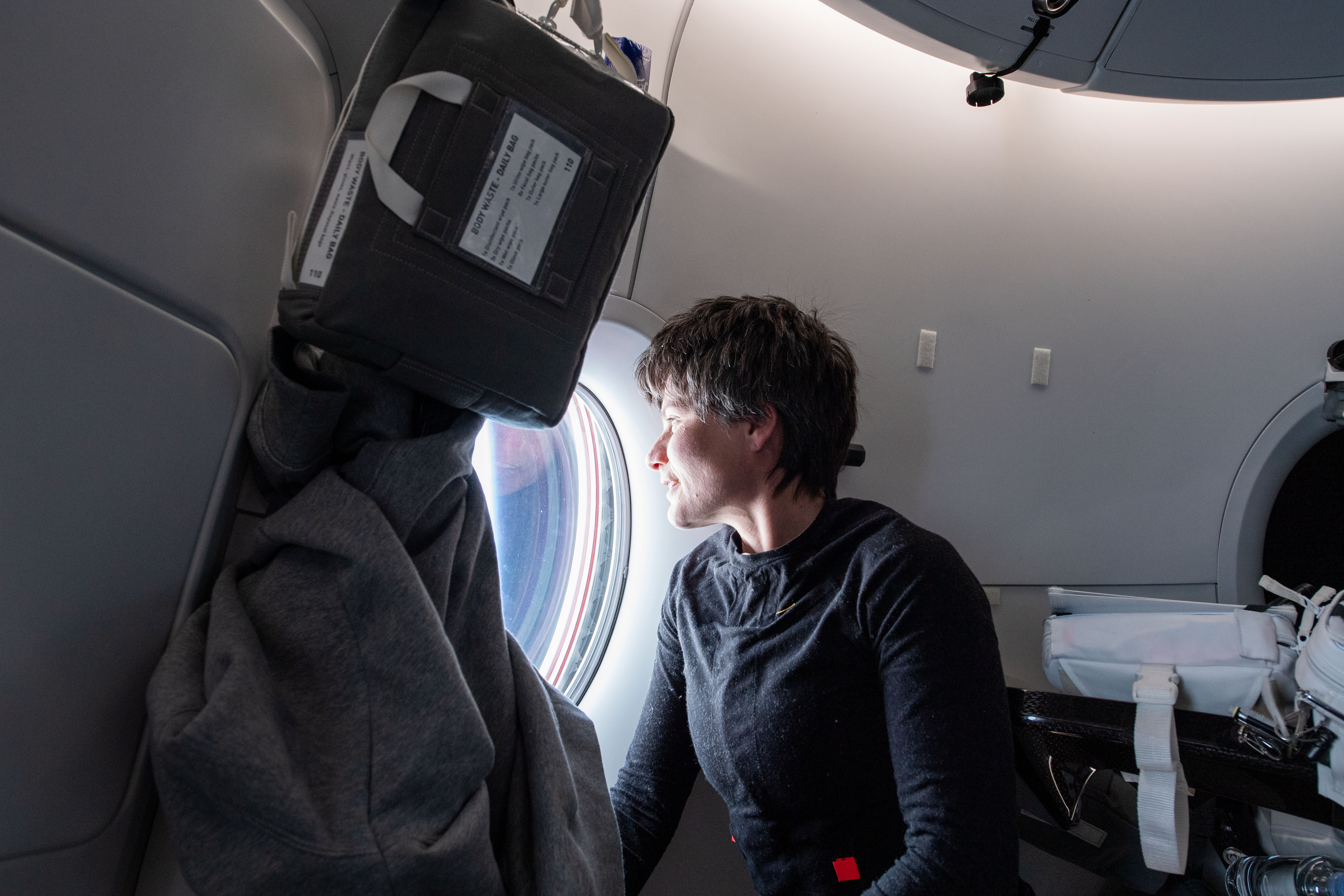
Cristoforetti looking out of the window of Freedom during flight to the ISS

Cristoforetti was assigned to fly to the International Space Station a second time in the spring of 2022. She flew on the fourth mission of NASA's Commercial Crew Program, SpaceX Crew-4 on a SpaceX Crew Dragon spacecraft. The mission launched on 27 April 2022, before docking later that day. Cristoforetti's second mission to the ISS is called Minerva. She was the first person to make a TikTok video on board the International Space Station and some of her onboard videos has been viewed millions of times. On 13 May 2022 she became the first astronaut to operate the rHEALTH ONE, space's most powerful biomedical analyzer to date. She demonstrated loading of tiny drops of biological samples into the device and collection of over 100 million raw data points over several minutes with laser-based sheath-flow analysis. Her successful operation paves the way for big data in space for understanding and treating spaceflight medical conditions including circadian rhythm disturbances, bone loss, ionizing radiation exposure, and kidney stones, among other conditions.

On 21 July 2022, Cristoforetti completed her first spacewalk, which lasted 7 hours and 5 minutes. Along with Oleg Artemyev, the joint ESA-Roscosmos spacewalk was the third spacewalk to set up the European Robotic Arm. Cristoforetti was the first non-Russian to use the Orlan spacesuit since Michael Barratt in June 2009, and the first European astronaut to do so since Jean-Pierre Haigneré on 16 April 1999.

She took command of ISS Expedition 68 on 28 September 2022 and returned to Earth aboard Crew Dragon Freedom on 14 October 2022, which completed the SpaceX Crew-4 mission.

=== NEEMO 23 ===
Cristoforetti commanded NEEMO mission 23 from 10 to 22 June 2019. This mission tested technologies and objectives for deep space mission and lunar explorations on the seafloor.

== Personal life ==
Cristoforetti can speak Italian, English, German, French, Russian, and Chinese.

Cristoforetti is married to a French engineer, Lionel Ferra. In November 2016, she gave birth to a girl in Cologne, Germany. In 2021, she gave birth to a boy.

Cristoforetti appeared in the final of the Eurovision Song Contest 2022, which was held in Turin, in a pre-recorded message from the International Space Station. She participated in the 2026 Winter Olympics opening ceremony.

== Bibliography ==
- Cristoforetti, Samantha (2020). Diary of an Apprentice Astronaut. English translation from Italian by Jill Foulston. Great Britain: Allen Lane. ISBN 978-0-2413-7138-1.

== Honours and decorations ==
- Italy Commander of the Order of Merit of the Italian Republic on 6 March 2013
- Italy Knight Grand Cross of the Order of Merit of the Italian Republic on 16 July 2015

== See also ==
- A Beautiful Planet—2016 IMAX documentary film showing scenes of Earth which features Cristoforetti and other ISS astronauts.
- Italian Space Agency (Agenzia Spaziale Italiana, ASI)
- Women in space

Preceded by Oleg Artemyev	ISS Commander (Expedition 68); 28 September to 12 October 2022	Succeeded by Sergey Prokopyev
