= Bust of Spock =

Bronze sculpture in Vulcan, Alberta, Canada

- Interactive map of Bust of Spock
- Location: 104 2nd Avenue S, Vulcan, Alberta, Canada
- Coordinates: 50°24′13.42″N 113°15′42.36″W
- Type: Bust
- Material: Bronze
- Opening date: April 23, 2010
- Dedicated to: Spock; Leonard Nimoy; Star Trek

The bust of Spock is a monument in the town Vulcan in Alberta, Canada, placed on the corner of Centre Street and 2nd Avenue S. It has the form of a bronze bust sculpture, depicting Spock, a character from science fiction television series Star Trek: The Original Series, portrayed by actor Leonard Nimoy. It also features a plaque with his handprint cast in bronze, performing the Vulcan salute. It was unveiled on April 23, 2010. The sculpture celebrates the coincidental similarity of the town's name to the fictional homeworld of extraterrestrial species of Vulcans, with Spock being its member.

== History ==
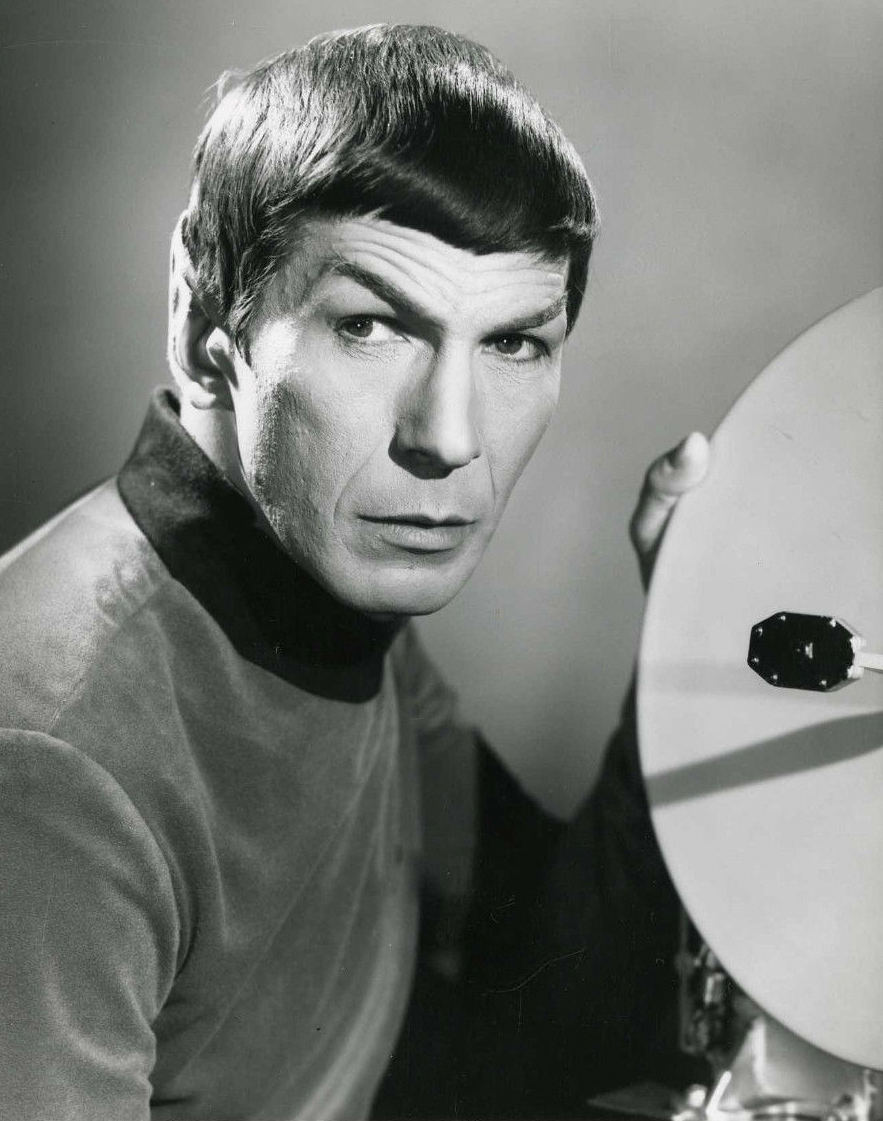
Leonard Nimoy as Spock in 1967.

The monument dedicated to Spock, the one of main characters from science fiction television series Star Trek: The Original Series, was unveiled in the town of Vulcan in Alberta, Canada, on April 23, 2010, by Leonard Nimoy, who portrayed him. The sculpture celebrates the coincidental similarity of the town's name to the fictional homeworld of extra-terrestrial species of Vulcans, with Spock being its member.

During the ceremony, Nimoy left a handprint of his right hand, to be cast in bronze and later added to the monument. It was imprinted performing the Vulcan salute, with open hand, and fingers parted between the middle and ring. In the television series, it was recognizable gesture performed by Vulcans.

== Design ==
The monument is placed in front of a building at 104 2nd Avenue S, near the corner with Centre Street. It consists of a bronze bust sculpture of Spock, one of the main characters of the science fiction television series Star Trek: The Original Series, portrayed by Leonard Nimoy. He is depicted as characterized in the television series, with pointed ears, sharp high-raised eyebrows and bowl cut with pointed sideburns, wearing a Starfleet uniform, with a badge on his chest. A plaque featuring the handprint of Nimoy's right hand, is placed in front of the bust. It performs Vulcan salute, with open hand, and fingers parted between the middle and ring finger.
