= Soyuz TMA-15M =

2014 Russian crewed spaceflight to the ISS

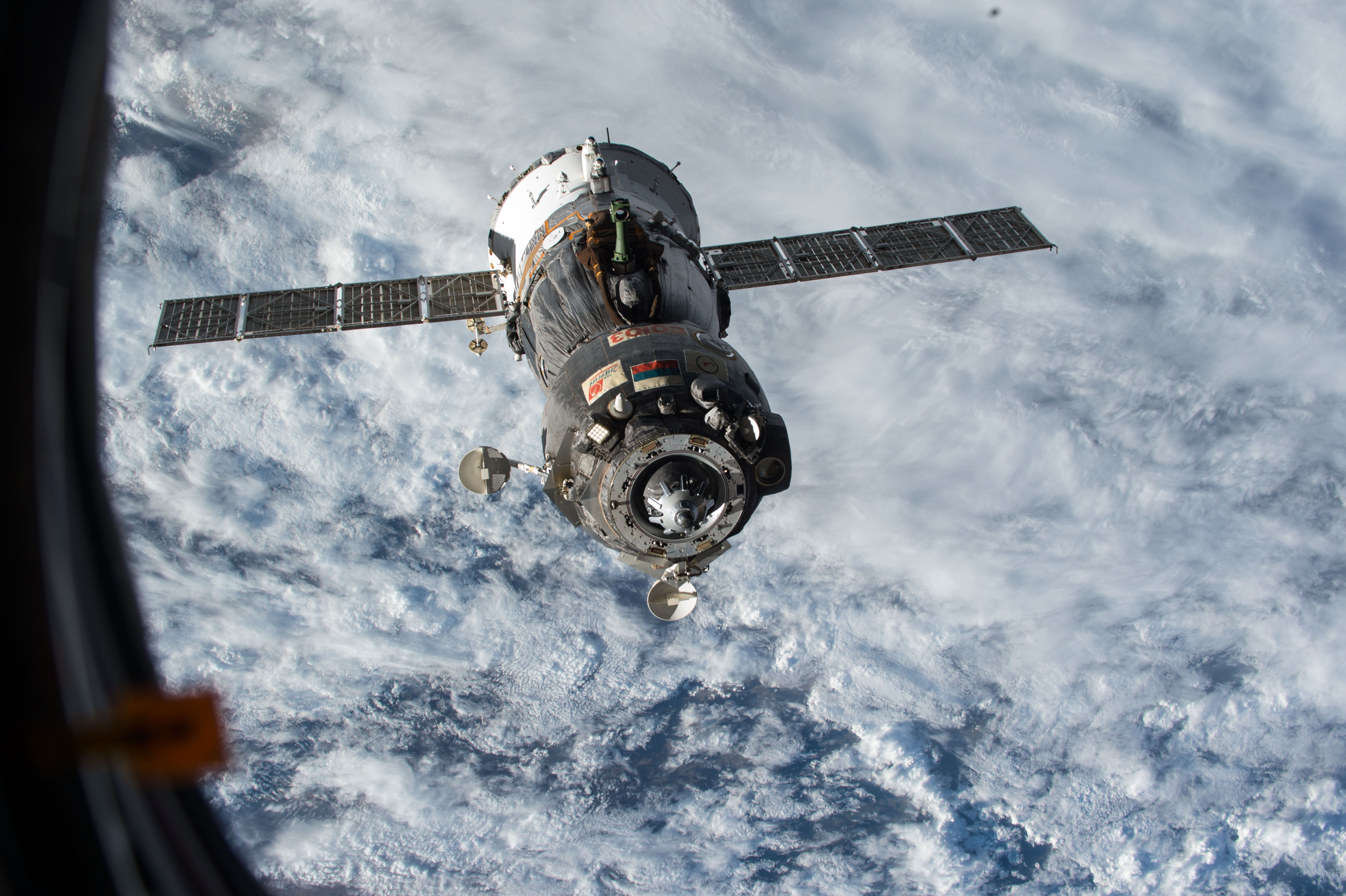
- Soyuz TMA-15M undocks from the ISS, 11 June 2015.
- Mission type: ISS crew transport
- Operator: Roscosmos
- COSPAR ID: 2014-074A
- SATCAT no.: 40312
- Mission duration: 199d 16h 42m 46s

Spacecraft properties
- Spacecraft: Soyuz 11F732A47 No.715
- Spacecraft type: Soyuz TMA-M 11F747
- Manufacturer: Energia

Crew
- Crew size: 3
- Members: Anton Shkaplerov; Samantha Cristoforetti; Terry W. Virts, Jr.
- Callsign: Астрей ("Astraeus")

Start of mission
- Launch date: 23 November 2014; 21:00:14 UTC
- Rocket: Soyuz-FG
- Launch site: Baikonur 31/6

End of mission
- Landing date: 11 June 2015; 13:44 UTC

Orbital parameters
- Reference system: Geocentric
- Regime: Low Earth

Docking with ISS
- Docking port: Rassvet nadir
- Docking date: 24 November 2014; 02:49 UTC
- Undocking date: 11 June 2015; 10:20 UTC
- Time docked: 199 days, 7 hours, 31 minutes
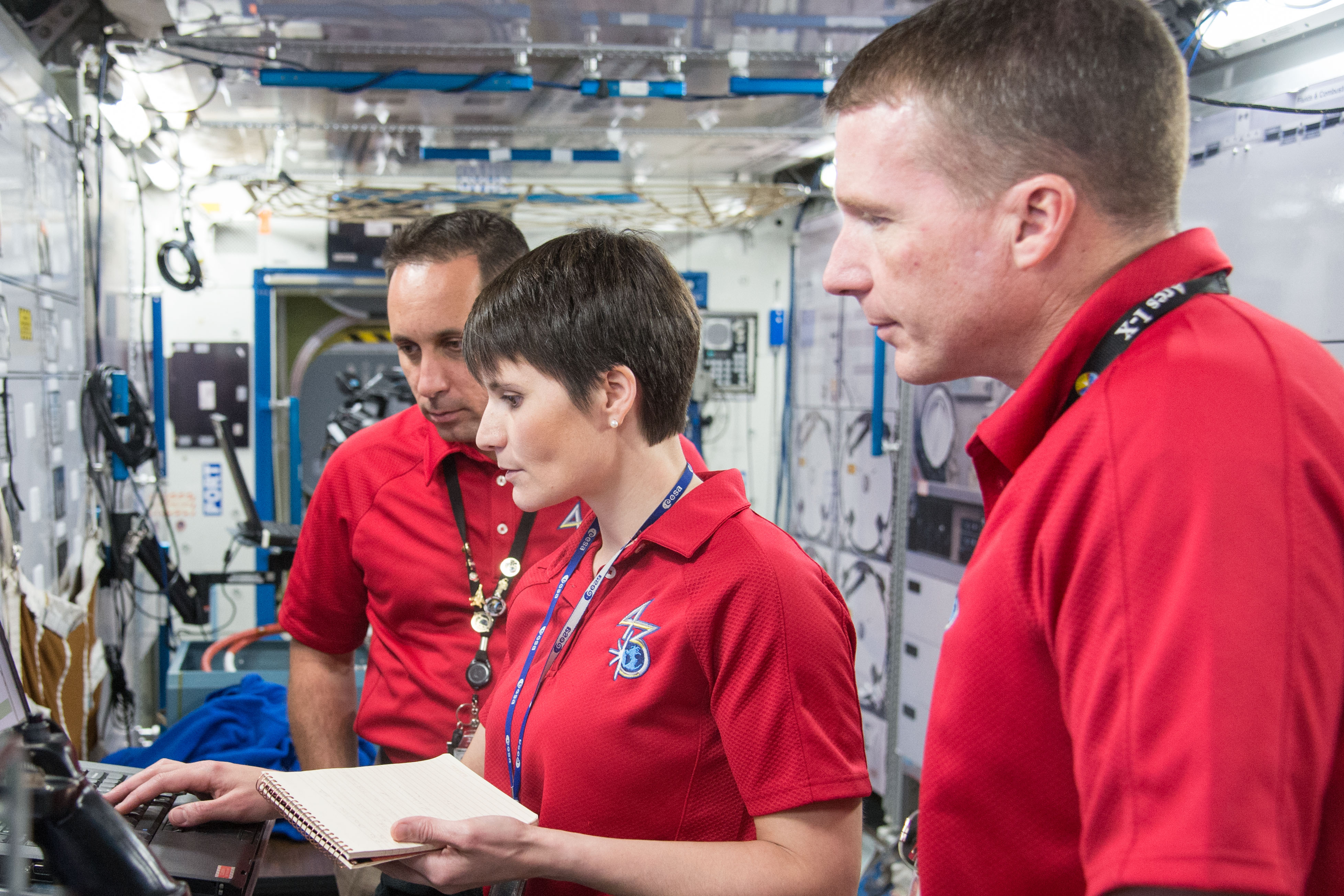
- (l-r) Shkaplerov, Cristoforetti and Virts Soyuz programme (Crewed missions)

Soyuz TMA-15M was a 2014 flight to the International Space Station. It transported three members of the Expedition 42 crew to the International Space Station. TMA-15M was the 124th flight of a Soyuz spacecraft, the first flight launching in 1967. The Soyuz remained docked to the space station for the Expedition 43 increment, serving as an emergency escape vehicle until departing and returning to Earth as scheduled in June 2015. The European segment of the mission was called "Futura".

== Crew ==
Position	Crew Member
Commander	(Russia) Anton Shkaplerov, Roscosmos; Expedition 42; Second spaceflight
Flight Engineer 1	(Italy) Samantha Cristoforetti, ESA; Expedition 42; First spaceflight
Flight Engineer 2	(United States) Terry W. Virts, Jr., NASA; Expedition 42; Second and last spaceflight

=== Backup crew ===
Position	Crew Member
Commander	(Russia) Oleg Kononenko, Roscosmos
Flight Engineer 1	(Japan) Kimiya Yui, JAXA
Flight Engineer 2	(United States) Kjell N. Lindgren, NASA

== Mission highlights ==
=== Launch, rendezvous and docking ===
Soyuz TMA-15M launched successfully aboard a Soyuz-FG rocket from the Baikonur Cosmodrome in Kazakhstan at 21:01 UTC on Sunday, 23 November 2014. The spacecraft reached low Earth orbit approximately nine minutes after lift-off. After executing rendezvous maneuvers, the Soyuz docked with the International Space Station at 02:49 UTC on 24 November, with hatch opening occurring at 05:00 UTC.

Soyuz TMA-15M was scheduled to remain docked to the ISS—serving as an emergency escape vehicle, planned to be on-board until May 2015. The landing was delayed until June 2015, when it was set to depart and return Shkaplerov, Cristoforetti and Virts to Earth.

Cristoforetti commemorated the spaceflight by gifting three Lego minifigures of herself, Virts and Shkaplerov to the other members of the Expedition 42 crew. They had been commissioned by ESA and built by a British custom Lego kitmaker.

=== Undocking and return to Earth ===
Soyuz TMA-15M accidentally fired its engines one day before undocking. The one minute burn slightly shifted ISS position.

Soyuz TMA-15M undocked from the ISS at 10:20 UTC on 11 June 2015, containing Shkaplerov, Cristoforetti, and Virts. Following a deorbit burn, the Soyuz spacecraft's descent module reentered the Earth's atmosphere. The crew landed safely in Kazakhstan at 13:44 UTC on 11 June, just over three hours after departing the ISS.

== Gallery ==
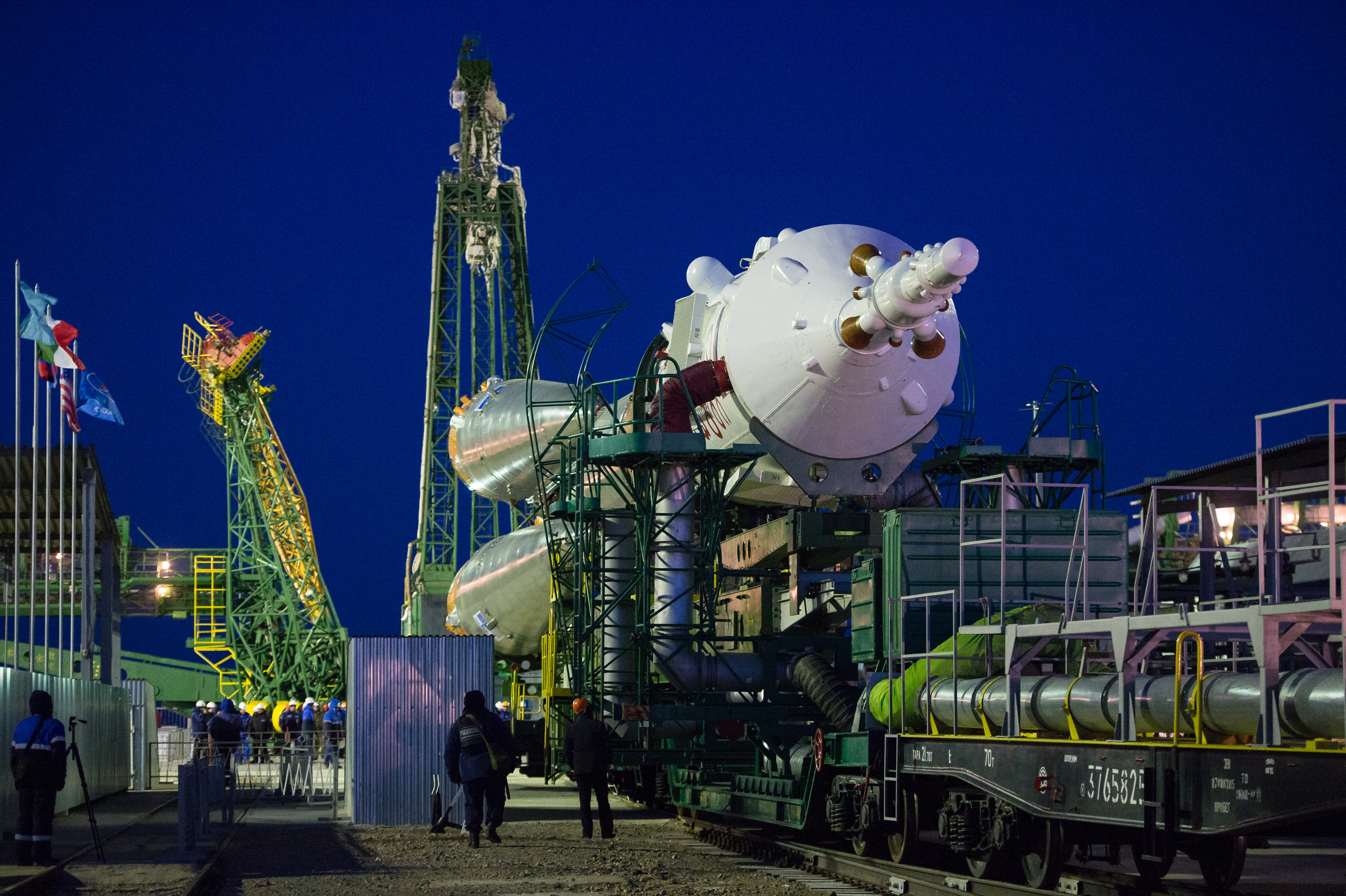
Rollout of Soyuz TMA-15M rocket.

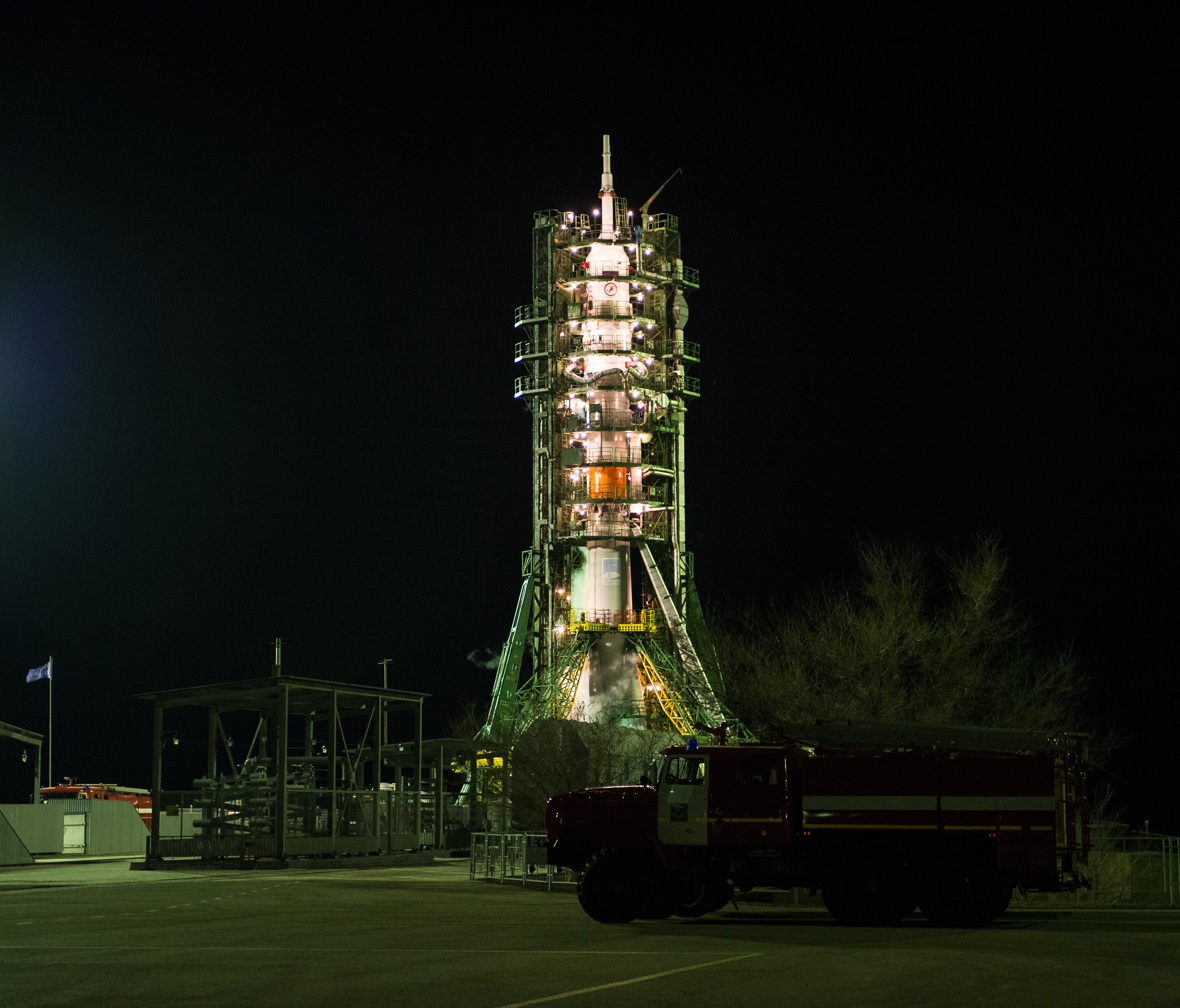
Soyuz TMA-15M on the launch pad after rollout.

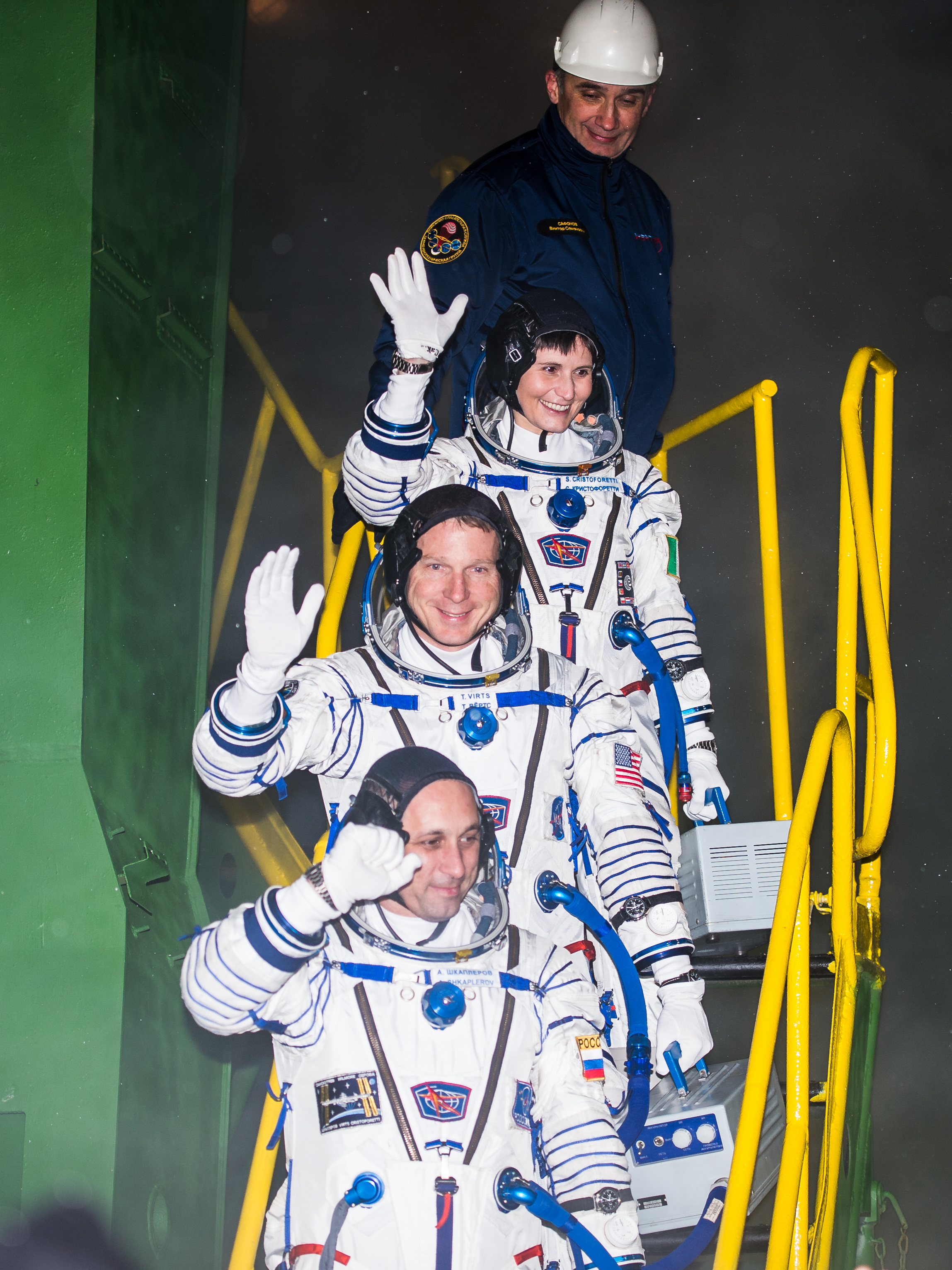
Crew of Soyuz TMA-15M wave to spectators before launch.

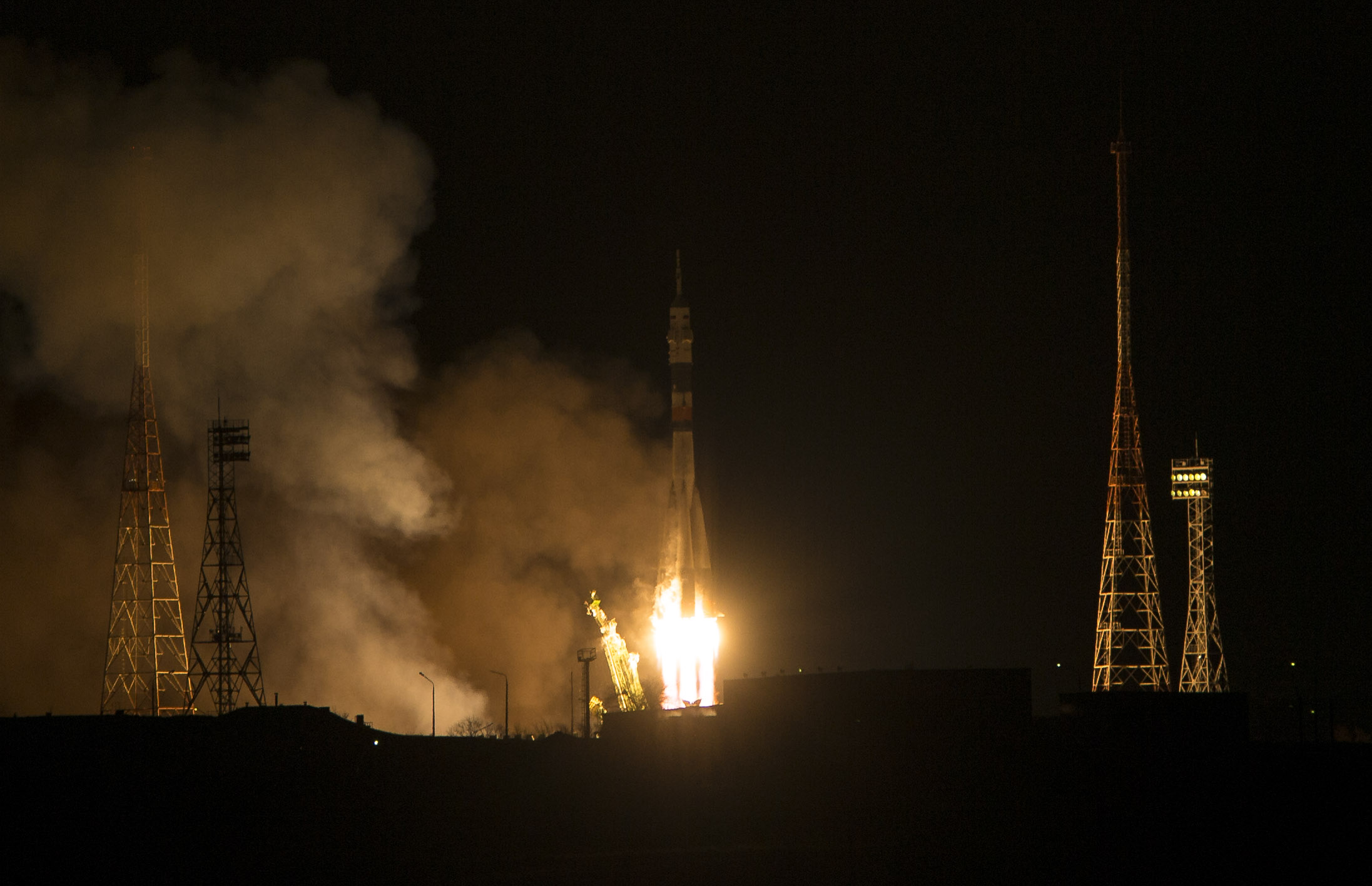
Soyuz TMA-15M launches from the Baikonur Cosmodrome.

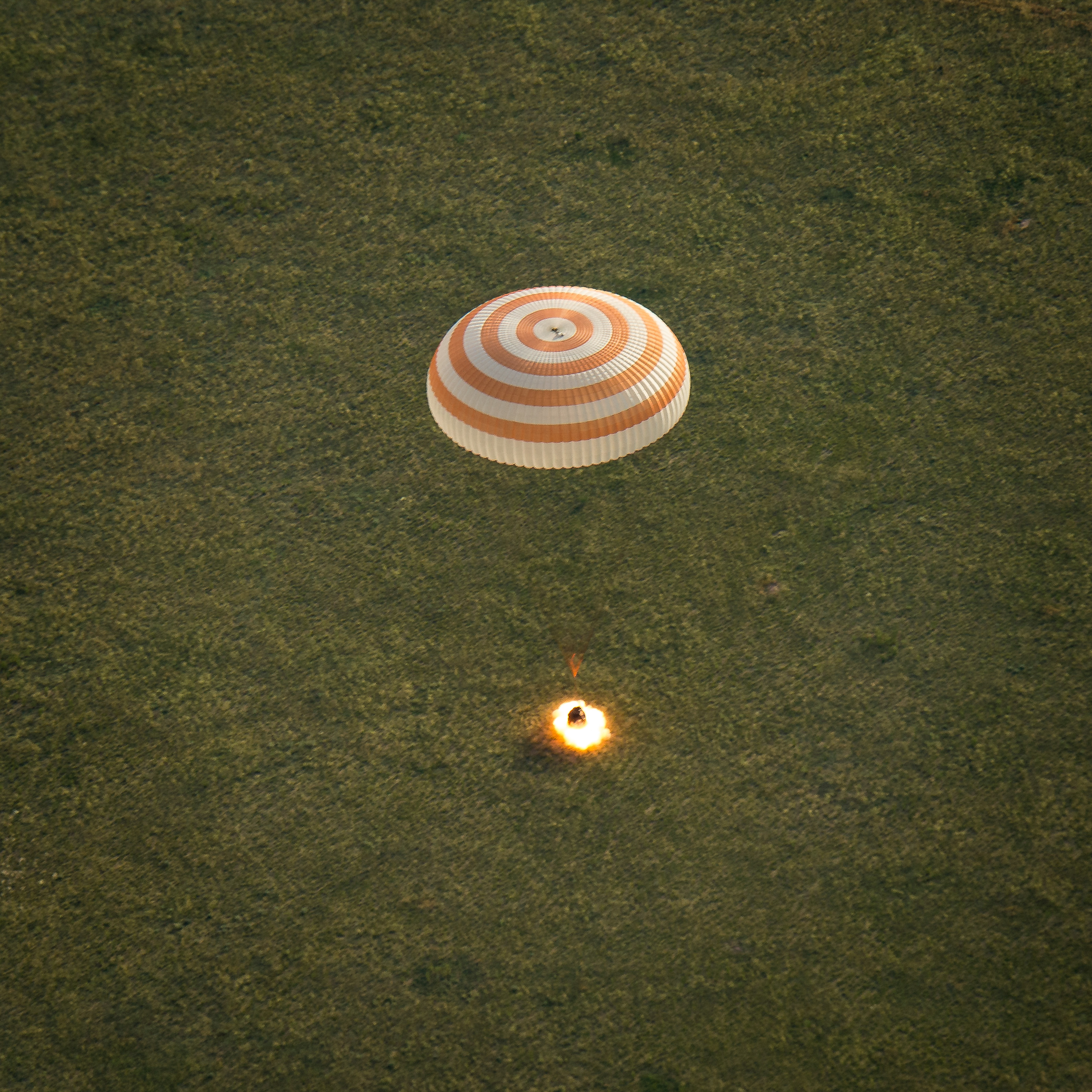
TMA-15M lands in Kazakhstan.
