= One More Orbit Mission =

The One More Orbit is a mission aimed at breaking the world record for the fastest circumnavigation of the Earth via both poles, involving a joint effort by a team from many nations led by Terry Virts and Hamish Harding.

An international flight crew set a new record for the fastest circumnavigation of the globe via the North and South Poles, clocking nearly six hours less than the previous mark. The 25,000-mile mission, named "One More Orbit," was led by Terry Virts, a former International Space Station commander, as a tribute to the Apollo 11 Moon landings.

== History ==
On July 11, 2019, One More Orbit achieved the World Speed Record for circumnavigating both Poles and the world. About five years before the mission, Hamish Harding discussed the idea of a global circumnavigation flight with some Apollo astronauts, sparking the concept of flying on "one more orbit."

During July 9–11, 2019, One More Orbit shattered the Round-the-World record for any aircraft by navigating over both the North and South poles. They completed the fastest Circumnavigation of the Earth via both the Poles in just 46 hours and 40 minutes, cruising at an average speed of 465 knots (535 mph or 861 km/h). The speed record achieved by One More Orbit is included and has received certification from both the Fédération Aéronautique Internationale (FAI) and Guinness World Records.

Led by Mission Directors Capt. Hamish Harding and Col. Terry Virts, a NASA Astronaut, alongside an eight-member crew, the record-breaking flight achieved a circumnavigation of Earth via both geographic poles using a Qatar Executive Gulfstream G650ER ultra-long-range business jet. This feat coincided with the 50th anniversary celebrations of the Apollo 11 Moon landing.

The mission took off from Space Florida's Launch and Landing Facility, previously known as NASA’s Kennedy Space Center's Shuttle Landing Facility, echoing the historic launch site of Apollo 11 half a century earlier.

The One More Orbit flight commenced precisely at 09:32 EDT, mirroring the exact launch time of Apollo 11. It ended at 12:12 UTC on July 11, 2019.
