= Terry Virts =

American astronaut (born 1967)

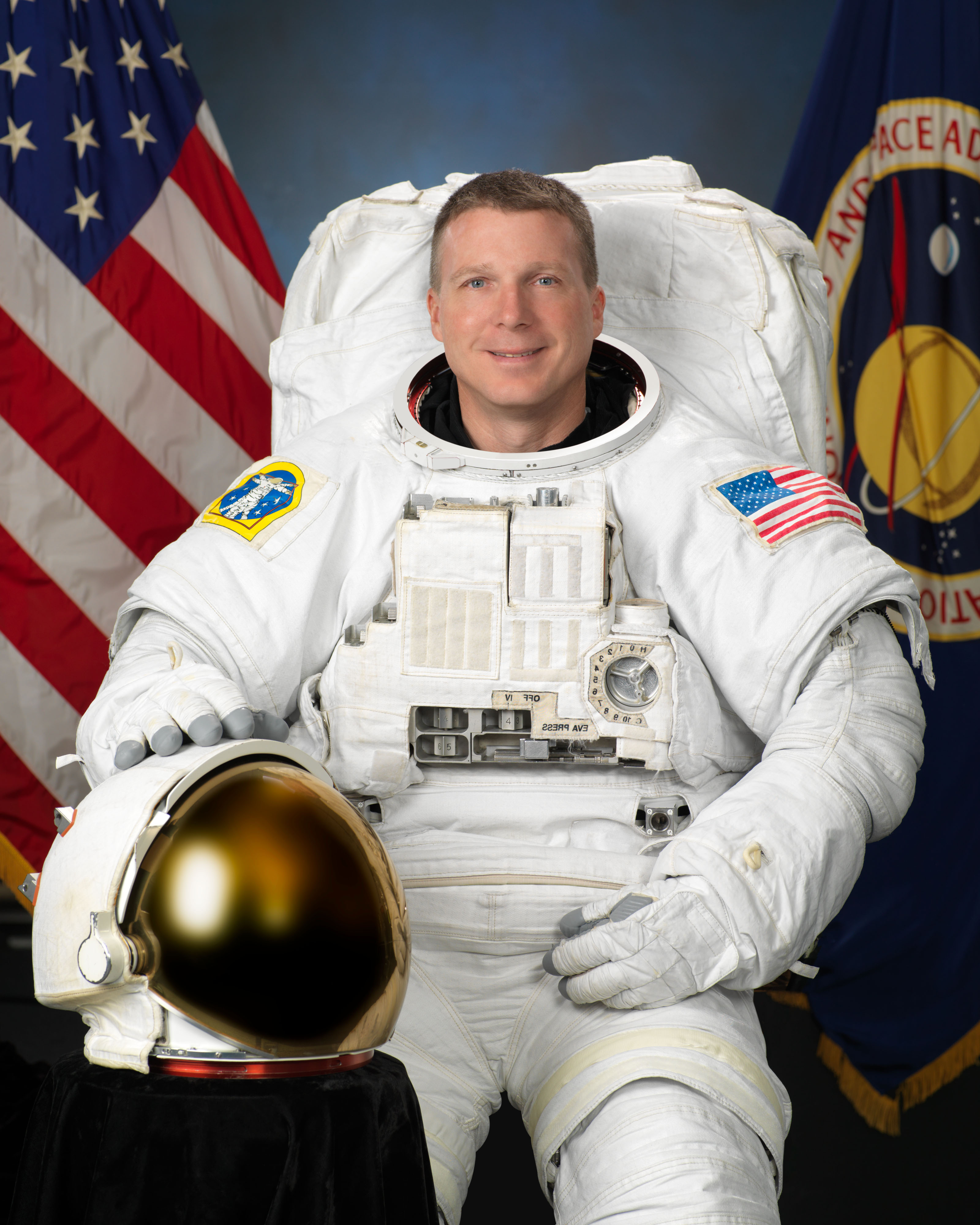
- Official portrait, 2014
- Born: Terry Wayne Virts Jr. December 1, 1967 (age 58); Baltimore, Maryland, U.S.
- Education: United States Air Force Academy (BS); Embry–Riddle Aeronautical University (MS)
- Political party: Democratic
- Space career

NASA astronaut
- Rank: Colonel, USAF
- Time in space: 213d 10h 48m
- Selection: NASA Group 18 (2000)
- Total EVAs: 3
- Total EVA time: 19h 2m
- Missions: STS-130; Soyuz TMA-15M (Expedition 42/43)
- Retired: August 2016
- Website: Campaign website Personal website

Terry Wayne Virts Jr. (born December 1, 1967) is a retired NASA astronaut, International Space Station commander, and colonel in the United States Air Force. Virts is a member of the Democratic Party. He was a candidate in the 2026 United States Senate election in Texas and later ran for Texas's 9th congressional district, but withdrew from the former and was eliminated in the primary for the latter.

== Background and education ==
Virts was born in Baltimore, Maryland, and grew up in Columbia, Maryland. He graduated from Oakland Mills High School in 1985. He earned a Bachelor of Science degree in Mathematics (with a French minor) from the United States Air Force Academy in 1989 and a Master of Science degree in aeronautics from Embry–Riddle Aeronautical University in 1997. While at the Air Force Academy, Virts attended the École de l'Air in 1988 on an exchange program. While at NASA he completed a General Management Program at Harvard Business School in 2011.

== Military career ==
Virts was commissioned as a Second Lieutenant upon graduation from the United States Air Force Academy in 1989 and earned his pilot wings at Williams Air Force Base, Arizona. He completed basic fighter lead-in training at Holloman Air Force Base, New Mexico followed by formal training in the F-16 Fighting Falcon with the 56th Tactical Fighter Wing at MacDill Air Force Base, Florida.

He was then assigned to the 31st Tactical Fighter Wing at Homestead Air Force Base, Florida. After Hurricane Andrew struck southern Florida in 1992, his squadron was moved to Moody Air Force Base, Georgia. He was later assigned to the 36th Fighter Squadron at Osan Air Base, Republic of Korea, and the 22nd Fighter Squadron at Spangdahlem Air Base, Germany.

Virts was selected for test pilot school in 1997 at Edwards Air Force Base, California. Following graduation, he was an experimental test pilot at the F-16 Combined Test Force at MacDill Air Force Base in Florida. He has logged more than 5,300 flight hours in 40 different aircraft.

== NASA career ==
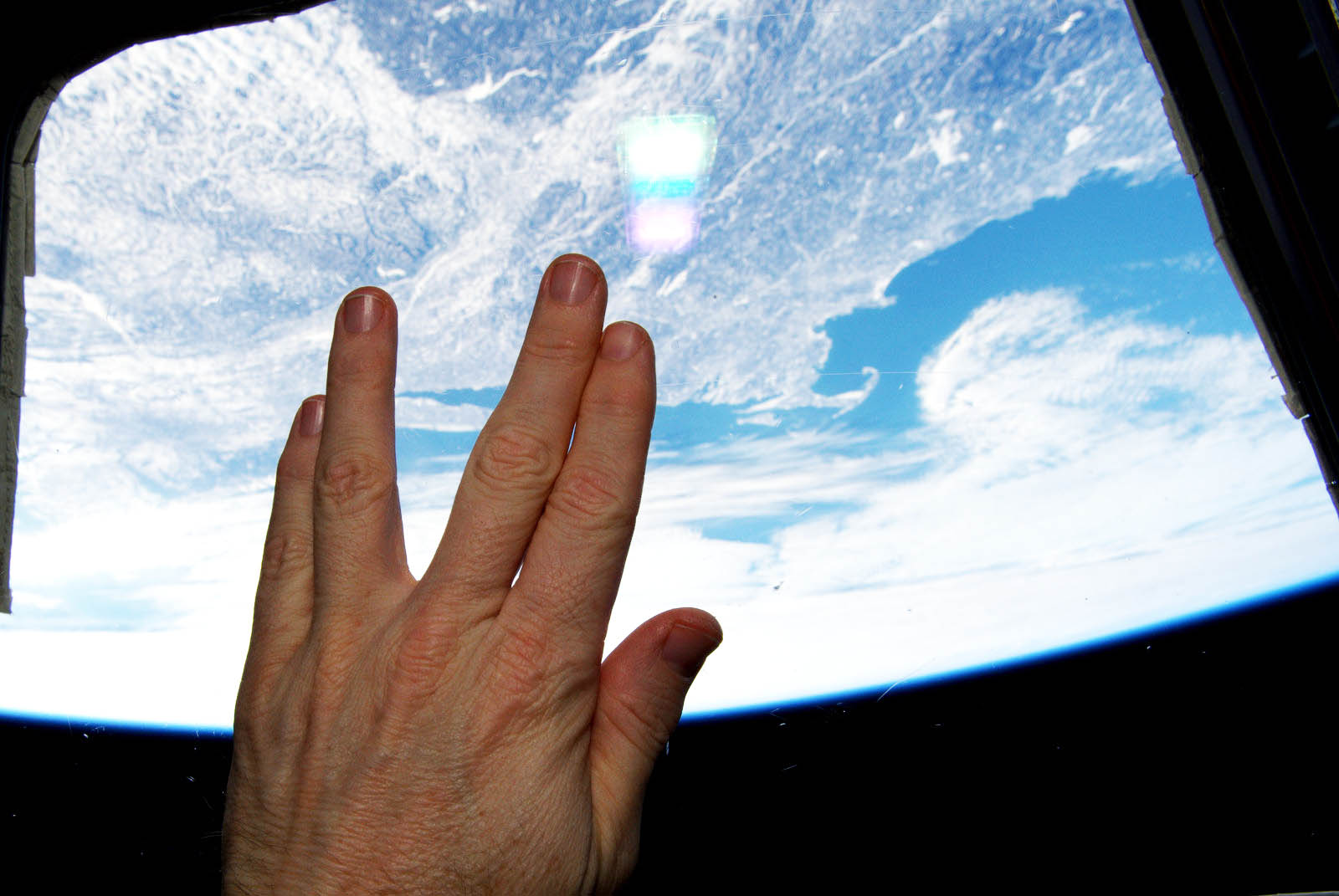
Virts gives the Vulcan salute to Boston, Massachusetts—Leonard Nimoy's hometown—after hearing of Nimoy's death

Virts's NASA career spanned several pivotal roles and space missions. In 2000, Virts was selected as a Space Shuttle pilot by NASA. His career was marked by a series of important technical assignments and mission roles.

One of his notable assignments was serving as the lead astronaut for the NASA T-38 program, where he contributed to the training and preparation of fellow astronauts. Virts also played a crucial role as a member of the Shuttle Avionics Integration Laboratory (SAIL) test crew, participating in critical systems testing and integration efforts.

In 2004, Virts supported Expedition 9 as a crew support astronaut, providing valuable assistance to the mission's crew members. Additionally, he took on the role of a Capsule Communicator (CAPCOM), acting as a vital link between ground control and astronauts in space.

Virts's contributions extended to the Space Launch System (SLS) program, where he served as the lead astronaut, playing an instrumental role in the development and advancement of this vital component of NASA's future missions.

On February 8, 2010, Virts embarked on his maiden spaceflight as the pilot of STS-130 aboard the Space Shuttle Endeavour. This historic mission marked the final assembly flight of the International Space Station and delivered the Tranquility module as well as the Cupola. The mission concluded with a safe landing on February 22, 2010.

On November 23, 2014, Virts launched aboard Soyuz TMA-15M alongside fellow astronauts Samantha Cristoforetti and Anton Shkaplerov from the Baikonur Cosmodrome in Kazakhstan. They successfully docked at the International Space Station approximately six hours later.

Virts paid tribute to the late Star Trek actor Leonard Nimoy, who portrayed Spock, from space on February 28, 2015. He tweeted an image of himself from the International Space Station, striking the Vulcan salute as the ISS flew over Boston, MA, Nimoy's birthplace.

With the impending departure of Soyuz TMA-14M in March 2015, Virts assumed the role of the commander of the International Space Station, leading Expedition 43. The mission concluded with a successful landing on June 11, 2015, in Kazakhstan.

In August 2016, Virts retired from NASA.

== Post-NASA career and politics ==
Following his career at NASA, Virts entered the fields of public speaking, podcast appearances, including creating a podcast "Down To Earth", business consultancy, literature, film-making, and screenwriting.

In 2019, Virts was part of a crew of eight aviation explorers who achieved the fastest circumnavigation of Earth via both geographic poles by airplane. This was accomplished on July 11, 2019, in a time of 46 hours, 40 minutes, and 22 seconds. The accomplishment earned recognition from Guinness World Records and the Fédération Aéronautique Internationale (FAI).

Virts made an appearance on The Joe Rogan Experience on December 11, 2020.

In 2022, Virts joined Group Of Humans, a global community of interdisciplinary experts, contributing to their "One Step Further" lunar initiative, which brings together storytellers, designers, and technologists to explore the future space economy.

=== 2026 candidacy ===
In June 2025, Virts declared his candidacy in the 2026 U.S. Senate election in Texas for the seat currently held by Republican John Cornyn. Virts describes himself as a "common-sense Democrat" and says that he is against illegal immigration while supporting legal immigration. He has criticized the perceived support of illegal immigration by the Democratic Party during the Biden administration.

In November 2025, Virts withdrew his candidacy for the Senate, and announced his candidacy for the U.S. House of Representatives in Texas's 9th Congressional District. He lost the Democratic Party nomination to Leticia Gutierrez.

== Awards and honors ==
Virts's achievements and awards encompass a career in both the military and space exploration.

Throughout his military service, Virts received several decorations and medals, including:

1. Meritorious Service Medal: Awarded for exceptional meritorious service, highlighting Virts's dedication and commitment during his military career.
2. Air Medal: Recognizing his courageous actions and exceptional achievements in aerial combat or significant flight operations.
3. Aerial Achievement Medal: Commending his exceptional accomplishments in aerial flight missions, displaying his remarkable skills and expertise.
4. Air Force Commendation Medal: Acknowledging his commendable performance and meritorious service in the United States Air Force.

Virts was a member of Expedition 42 aboard the International Space Station (ISS). The European Space Agency commissioned Lego mini-figures to honor the crew members of Expedition 42, including Terry Virts, Samantha Cristoforetti, and Anton Shkaplerov.

== Publications ==
- Virts, Terry (2017). View From Above: An Astronaut Photographs the World. National Geographic. Bibcode:2017vaaa.book.....V. – A coffee table book from National Geographic; contains mostly photographs of Earth, with additional photos of the Space Shuttle Endeavour, the International Space Station and related subjects; also contains stories about Virts's experiences as an astronaut.
- Virts, Terry (2019). Apo11o: To the Moon and Back. Book Arts. – A limited edition, luxury replication of the Apollo 11 Flight Plan.
- Virts, Terry (2020). How To Astronaut. Workman Publishing. – An Insiders Guide To Leaving Planet Earth.

== See also ==
- A Beautiful Planet – 2016 IMAX documentary film showing scenes of Earth which features Virts and other ISS astronauts.
- One More Orbit Mission – A mission and documentary film. In 2019, Virts circumnavigated the planet in a Gulfstream G650 via the North and South Poles in honor of the Apollo 11 mission's 50th anniversary. The mission broke the world time and speed records, earning Guinness World and FAI records.

Preceded by Barry E. Wilmore	ISS Expedition Commander; March 10, 2015 – June 11, 2015	Succeeded by Gennady Padalka
