= Vulcan salute =

Hand gesture popularized by Star Trek

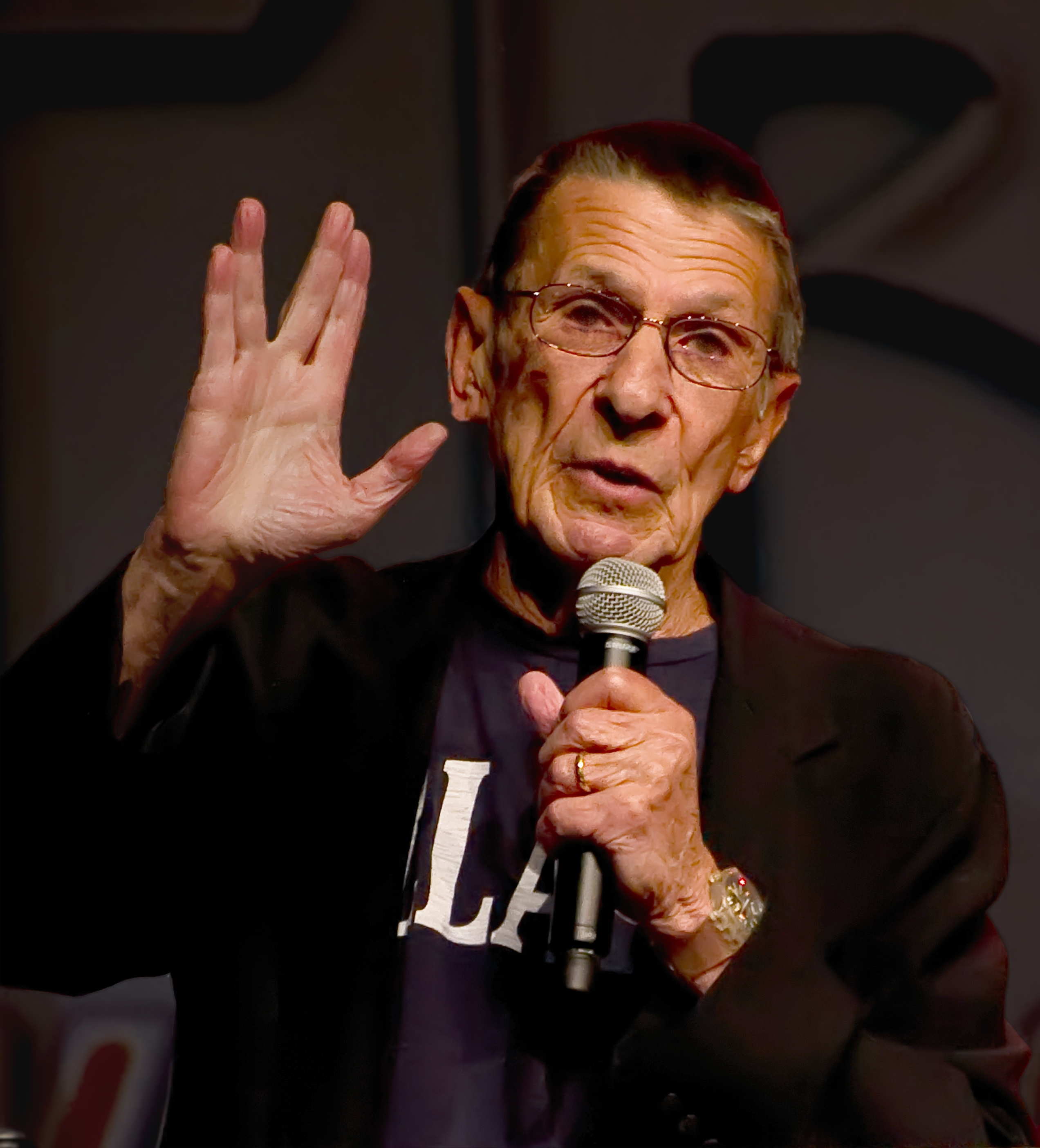
Leonard Nimoy demonstrating the Vulcan salutation at the Las Vegas Star Trek Convention in 2011

The Vulcan salute is a hand gesture popularized by the 1960s television series Star Trek. It consists of a raised hand with the palm forward and the thumb extended, while the fingers are parted between the middle and ring finger. The gesture was devised by Star Trek actor Leonard Nimoy as a salute for the alien Vulcan species, and is popular within the science fiction fandom and nerd culture. The blessing phrase "live long and prosper" (written by Theodore Sturgeon) is frequently spoken alongside it.

== Background ==
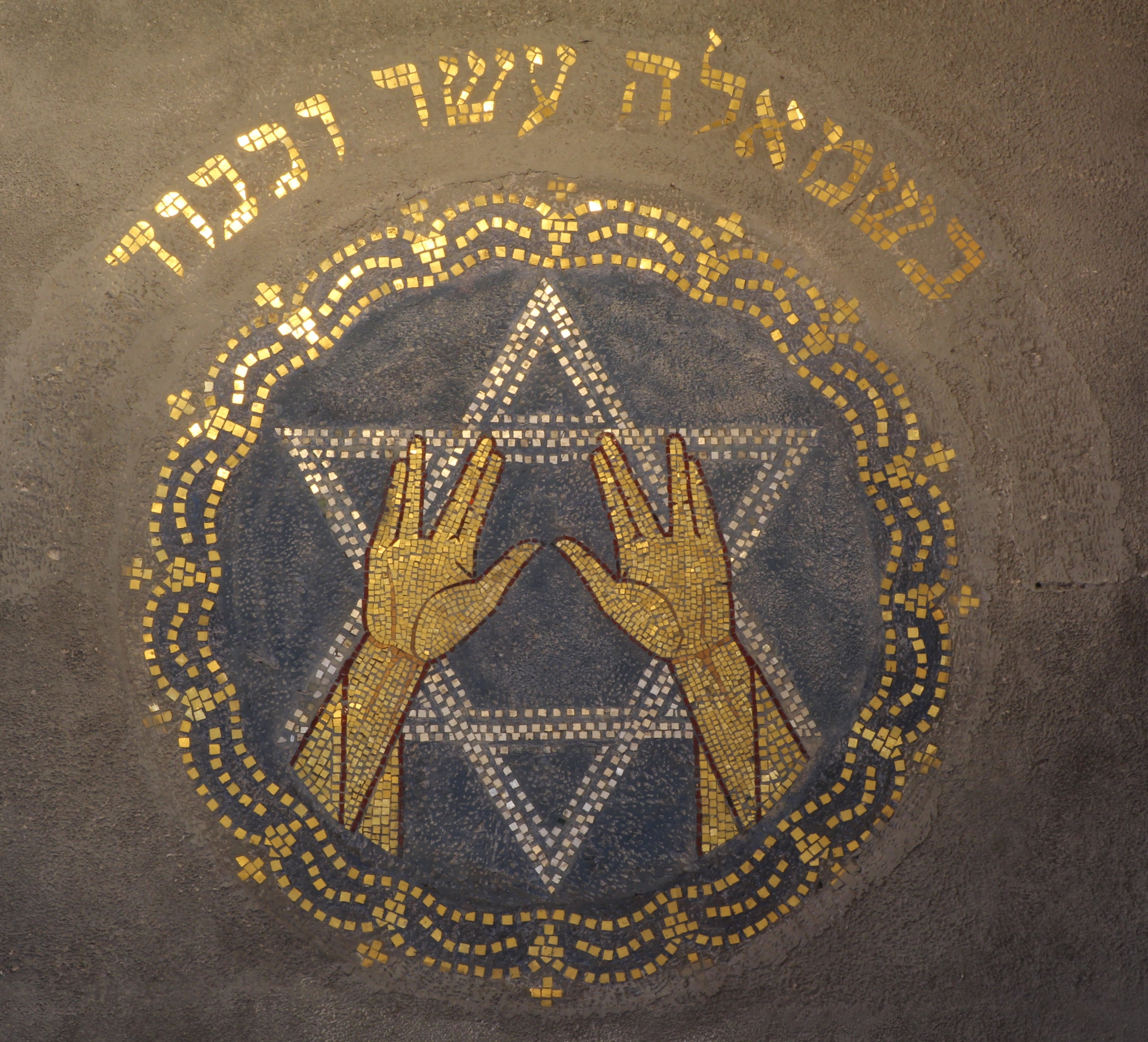
The blessing gesture which is the inspiration for the Vulcan salutation

The Vulcan "salute" first appeared in 1967 on the Star Trek second-season opening episode, "Amok Time", and was devised by Leonard Nimoy, who portrayed the half-Vulcan character Mr. Spock on the original Star Trek television series.

A 1968 New York Times interview described the gesture as a "double-fingered version of Churchill's victory sign". Nimoy said in that interview that he "decided that the Vulcans were a "hand-oriented" people". In his 1975 autobiography I Am Not Spock, Nimoy wrote that he based it on the Jewish "Birkat kohanim", a priestly blessing performed by a Kohen with both hands, thumb to thumb in this same position, representing the Hebrew letter shin (ש), which has three upward strokes similar to the position of the thumb and fingers in the gesture. The letter Shin here stands for El Shaddai, meaning "Almighty (God)" and Shalom.

Symbolism of the Shin (ש)

The three strokes of the letter Shin mirror the three-part structure of the Priestly Blessing itself, which consists of three verses in Numbers 6:24–26:

- "May the Lord bless you and protect you."
- "May the Lord make His face shine upon you and be gracious to you."
- "May the Lord lift up His countenance toward you and grant you peace."

— Numbers 6:24–26

The letter Shin also represents Shekhinah, the feminine aspect of the Divine Presence. According to Jewish tradition, during the Priestly Blessing, the Shekhinah would shine through the windows formed by the priests' fingers. This is why it was traditionally forbidden for the congregation to look at the priests' hands during the ceremony; it was believed that seeing the Divine Presence directly could lead to blindness or spiritual overwhelm. Nimoy famously mentioned in interviews that as a child his grandfather took him to an Orthodox synagogue, where he peeked and saw the blessing performed and was impressed by it.

The gesture is known for being difficult for certain people to do properly without practice or the covert pre-positioning of the fingers. Actors on the original show reportedly had to position their fingers off-screen with the other hand before raising their hand into frame. This difficulty may stem from variations in individuals' manual dexterity. It is parodied in the 1996 motion picture Star Trek: First Contact when Zefram Cochrane, upon meeting a Vulcan for the first time in human history, is unable to return the gesture and instead shakes the Vulcan's hand.

Others often greeted Nimoy with the Vulcan sign, which became so well known that in June 2014 its emoji character was added to the Unicode Standard in version 7.0 as U+1F596 🖖 RAISED HAND WITH PART BETWEEN MIDDLE AND RING FINGERS.

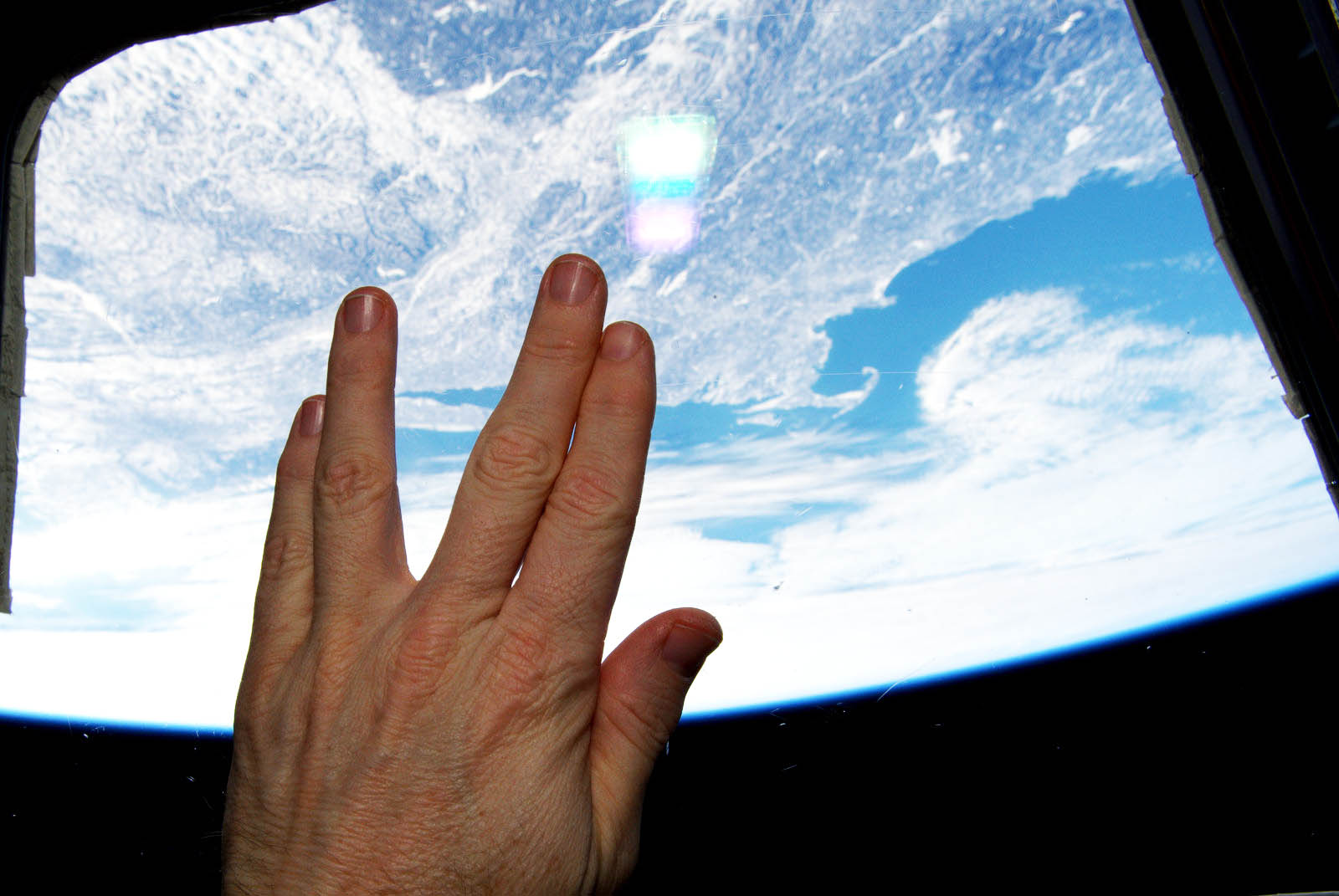
NASA astronaut Terry W. Virts performs the Vulcan salutation aboard the International Space Station on February 27, 2015, shortly after hearing of Nimoy's death. Nimoy's hometown of Boston is seen directly below.

United States President Barack Obama referenced the Vulcan salutation in his statement on Nimoy's death, calling it "the universal sign for 'Live long and prosper'". The following day, NASA astronaut Terry W. Virts posted a photo on his Twitter feed from the International Space Station showing the salutation (with the Earth in the background) as the ISS passed over Boston, Massachusetts, where Nimoy grew up.

On 10 September 2026 - designated as Star Trek Day 2026 - in celebration of 60 years of the Star Trek franchise, 934 fans visiting the immersive Warp Trail exhibition at the Science Museum in London created a new Guinness World Records title: the most people performing a Vulcan salute simultaneously.

== "Live long and prosper" ==
The accompanying spoken blessing, "live long and prosper", was also first used in "Amok Time" alongside the salute. The phrase was scripted by Theodore Sturgeon. The less-well-known reply is "peace and long life", though it is sometimes said first, with "live long and prosper" as the reply. The phrase has been seen abbreviated "LLAP".

== See also ==
- Vulcan changeup, baseball pitch
- Open Hand Monument, conceived in 1948 by Le Corbusier
